= 24th Saskatchewan Legislature =

- Coalition parliament

Parliament leaders
- Premier: Roy Romanow; Nov. 1, 1991 – Feb. 8, 2001
- Lorne Calvert; Feb. 8, 2001 – Nov. 21, 2007
- Leader of the Opposition: Elwin Hermanson; Apr. 13, 1999 – Jul. 15, 2004

Party caucuses
- Government: NDP–Liberal coalition
- Opposition: Saskatchewan Party
- Members: 58 MLA seats

Sovereign
- Monarch: Elizabeth II; Sep. 8, 2022 – present
- Lieutenant governor: Jack Wiebe; May. 31, 1994 – Feb. 21, 2000
- Lynda Haverstock; Feb. 21, 2000 – Aug. 1, 2006
| ← 23rd | → 25th |

The 24th Legislative Assembly of Saskatchewan was elected in the 1999 Saskatchewan election. It was controlled by the New Democratic Party under Premier Roy Romanow. Romanow resigned as New Democratic Party leader in 2001 and was succeeded by Lorne Calvert for the remainder of the 24th Assembly.

== NDP/Liberal coalition ==
The election resulted in a divided legislature, with the governing NDP and the opposition each winning exactly 29 seats. As a result, Romanow negotiated a coalition agreement with the Liberal Party, which saw that party's three MLAs given cabinet posts in exchange for supporting the government. One of the three Liberal MLAs, Jack Hillson, subsequently resigned from the cabinet and sat as an independent for the duration of the Assembly.

Shortly after being elected leader of the Liberal Party in 2001, David Karwacki ordered an end to the coalition agreement. However, the two Liberal MLAs who remained in cabinet, Jim Melenchuk and Ron Osika, instead quit the Liberal caucus and continued in coalition with the NDP as independent MLAs. Both subsequently ran as NDP candidates in the 2003 election, but were both defeated.

== Party standings ==
| Affiliation | 1999 election results | Members at dissolution |
|---|---|---|
| New Democratic Party | 29 | 28 |
| Saskatchewan Party | 25 | 26 |
| Liberal | 3 | 1 |
| Independent | 0 | 3 |
| Vacant | 1 (Note: One constituency – Wood River – was initially won by the Liberals, but the result was overturned by the courts.) | 0 |
| Total | 58 | |

== Members ==
| District | Member | Party | First elected / previously elected | No.# of term(s) |
|---|---|---|---|---|
| Arm River | Greg Brkich | Saskatchewan Party | 1999 | 1st term |
| Athabasca | Buckley Belanger | New Democrat | 1995 (Note: First elected as a Liberal) | 2nd term |
| Battleford-Cut Knife | Rudi Peters | Saskatchewan Party | 1999 | 1st term |
| Battleford-Cut Knife | Wally Lorenz (2003) | Saskatchewan Party | 2003 | 1st term |
| Cannington | Dan D'Autremont | Saskatchewan Party | 1991 (Note: First elected as a Progressive Conservative) | 3rd term |
| Canora-Pelly | Ken Krawetz | Saskatchewan Party | 1995 | 2nd term |
| Carrot River Valley | Carl Kwiatkowski | Saskatchewan Party | 1999 | 1st term |
| Carrot River Valley | Allan Kerpan (2003) | Saskatchewan Party | 2003 | 1st term |
| Cumberland | Keith Goulet | New Democrat | 1986 | 4th term |
| Cypress Hills | Wayne Elhard | Saskatchewan Party | 1999 | 2nd term |
| Estevan | Doreen Eagles | Saskatchewan Party | 1999 | 1st term |
| Humboldt | Arlene Julé | Saskatchewan Party | 1995 | 2nd term |
| Indian Head-Milestone | Don McMorris | Saskatchewan Party | 1999 | 1st term |
| Kelvington-Wadena | June Draude | Saskatchewan Party | 1995 | 2nd term |
| Kindersley | Bill Boyd | Saskatchewan Party | 1991 | 3rd term |
| Kindersley | Jason Dearborn (2002) | Saskatchewan Party | 2002 | 1st term |
| Last Mountain-Touchwood | Glen Hart | Saskatchewan Party | 1999 | 1st term |
| Lloydminster | Milt Wakefield | Saskatchewan Party | 1999 | 1st term |
| Meadow Lake | Maynard Sonntag | New Democrat | 1991 | 3rd term |
| Melfort-Tisdale | Rod Gantefoer | Saskatchewan Party | 1995 | 2nd term |
| Melville | Ron Osika | Liberal | 1995 | 2nd term |
| Melville | Ron Osika | Independent | 1995 | 2nd term |
| Moose Jaw North | Glenn Hagel | New Democrat | 1986 | 4th term |
| Moose Jaw Wakamow | Deb Higgins | New Democrat | 1999 | 1st term |
| Moosomin | Don Toth | Saskatchewan Party | 1986 | 4th term |
| North Battleford | Jack Hillson | Liberal | 1996 | 2nd term |
| North Battleford | Jack Hillson | Independent | 1996 | 2nd term |
| Prince Albert Carlton | Myron Kowalsky | New Democrat | 1986 | 4th term |
| Prince Albert Northcote | Eldon Lautermilch | New Democrat | 1986 | 4th term |
| Redberry Lake | Randy Weekes | Saskatchewan Party | 1999 | 1st term |
| Regina Centre | Joanne Crofford | New Democrat | 1991 | 3rd term |
| Regina Coronation Park | Kim Trew | New Democrat | 1986 | 4th term |
| Regina Dewdney | Kevin Yates | New Democrat | 1999 | 2nd term |
| Regina Elphinstone | Dwain Lingenfelter | New Democrat | 1978, (Note: Shaunavon) 1988 | 6th term* |
| Regina Elphinstone | Kevin Yates (2001) | New Democrat | 2001 | 1st term |
| Regina Lakeview | John Nilson | New Democrat | 1995 | 2nd term |
| Regina Northeast | Ron Harper | New Democrat | 1991, (Note: Pelly) 1999 | 2nd term* |
| Regina Qu'Appelle Valley | Mark Wartman | New Democrat | 1999 | 1st term |
| Regina Sherwood | Lindy Kasperski | New Democrat | 1995 | 2nd term |
| Regina Sherwood | Lindy Kasperski | Independent | 1995 | 2nd term |
| Regina South | Andrew Thomson | New Democrat | 1995 | 2nd term |
| Regina Victoria | Harry Van Mulligen | New Democrat | 1986 | 4th term |
| Regina Wascana Plains | Doreen Hamilton | New Democrat | 1991 | 3rd term |
| Rosetown–Biggar | Elwin Hermanson | Saskatchewan Party | 1999 | 1st term |
| Rosthern | Ben Heppner | Saskatchewan Party | 1995 | 2nd term |
| Saltcoats | Bob Bjornerud | Saskatchewan Party | 1995 | 2nd term |
| Saskatchewan Rivers | Daryl Wiberg | Saskatchewan Party | 1999 | 1st term |
| Saskatoon Eastview | Judy Junor | New Democrat | 1998 | 2nd term |
| Saskatoon Fairview | Chris Axworthy | New Democrat | 1999 | 2nd term |
| Saskatoon Fairview | Andy Iwanchuk (2003) | New Democrat | 2003 | 1st term |
| Saskatoon Greystone | Peter Prebble | New Democrat | 1978, (Note: Saskatoon Sutherland) 1986, (Note: Saskatoon University) 1999 | 3rd term* |
| Saskatoon Idylwyld | Janice MacKinnon | New Democrat | 1991 | 3rd term |
| Saskatoon Idylwyld | David Forbes (2001) | New Democrat | 2001 | 1st term |
| Saskatoon Meewasin | Carolyn Jones | New Democrat | 1999 | 1st term |
| Saskatoon Mount Royal | Eric Cline | New Democrat | 1991 | 3rd term |
| Saskatoon Northwest | Jim Melenchuk | Liberal | 1999 | 1st term |
| Saskatoon Northwest | Jim Melenchuk | Independent | 1999 | 1st term |
| Saskatoon Nutana | Pat Atkinson | New Democrat | 1986 | 4th term |
| Saskatoon Riversdale | Roy Romanow | New Democrat | 1967, 1986 | 8th term* |
| Saskatoon Riversdale | Lorne Calvert (2001) | New Democrat | 1986, (Note: Moose Jaw Wakamow) 2001 | 4th term* |
| Saskatoon Southeast | Pat Lorje | New Democrat | 1991 | 3rd term |
| Saskatoon Sutherland | Graham Addley | New Democrat | 1999 | 1st term |
| Shellbrook-Spiritwood | Denis Allchurch | Saskatchewan Party | 1999 | 1st term |
| Swift Current | Brad Wall | Saskatchewan Party | 1999 | 1st term |
| Thunder Creek | Lyle Stewart | Saskatchewan Party | 1999 | 1st term |
| Watrous | Donna Harpauer | Saskatchewan Party | 1999 | 1st term |
| Weyburn-Big Muddy | Brenda Bakken | Saskatchewan Party | 1999 | 1st term |
| Wood River | Glen McPherson | Liberal | 1991 (Note: First elected as a New Democrat) | 3rd term |
| Wood River | Yogi Huyghebaert (2000) | Saskatchewan Party | 2000 | 1st term |
| Yorkton | Clay Serby | New Democrat | 1991 | 3rd term |
