= 1999 Saskatchewan general election =

Canadian provincial election

- September 16, 1999

58 seats in the Legislative Assembly of Saskatchewan 30 seats needed for a majority
- Turnout: 65.5% (▲0.9pp)
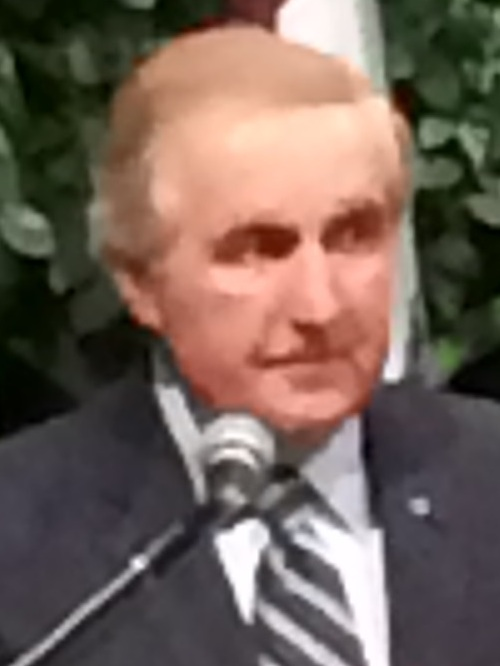

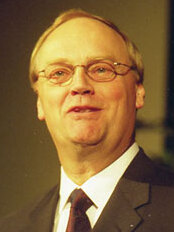
	First party	Second party	Third party
			LIB
Leader	Roy Romanow	Elwin Hermanson	Jim Melenchuk
Party	New Democratic	Saskatchewan	Liberal
Leader since	November 7, 1987	April 20, 1998	November 24, 1996
Leader's seat	Saskatoon Riversdale	Rosetown-Elrose	Saskatoon Northwest
Last election	42	pre-creation	11
Seats before	43	10	5
Seats won	29	25	4
Seat change	▼14	▲15	▼1
Popular vote	157,046	160,603	81,694
Percentage	38.73%	39.61%	20.15%
Swing	▼8.48pp	▲39.61	▼14.55pp
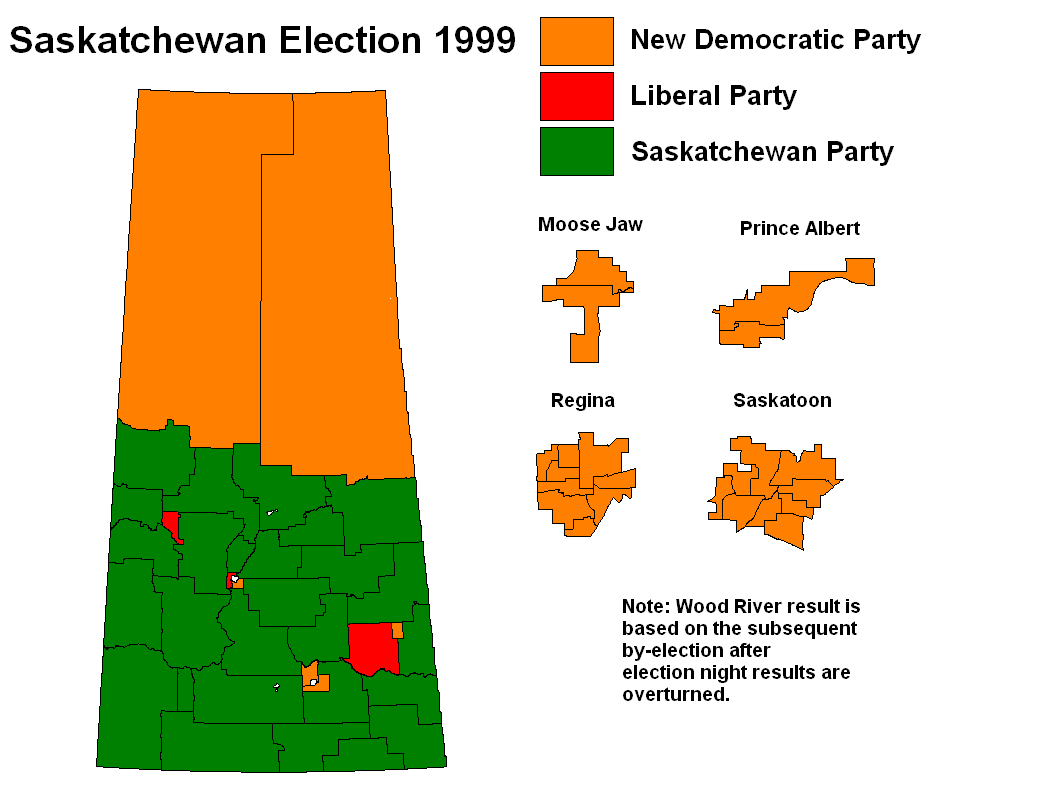
Premier before election
Roy Romanow
New Democratic
Premier after election
Roy Romanow
New Democratic

The 1999 Saskatchewan general election was held on September 16, 1999 to elect members of the 24th Legislative Assembly of Saskatchewan. The new Saskatchewan Party took more votes than any other party but the NDP took more seats, taking half the seats in the Saskatchewan Legislature. The NDP formed a coalition with four elected Liberal Party MLAs to hold majority government.

Polls during the campaign indicated strong levels of support for the New Democratic Party government. However, facing the fallout of a poor crop growing season and a scandal involving the Crown Corporation electric utility SaskPower (Channel Lake), the New Democrat government of Premier Roy Romanow – challenged by the newly created Saskatchewan Party – lost a significant share of the popular vote; winning exactly half of the fifty eight seats in the legislature.

The right-wing Saskatchewan Party was created during the sitting of the 23rd Assembly when much of the Progressive Conservative caucus joined forces with conservative Liberals who were unhappy with the leadership of Jim Melenchuk.

The new party was led by Elwin Hermanson, a former Reform Party federal Member of Parliament. In this election, it won 39.61% of the popular vote – slightly more than the NDP's 38.73%. However, this was only enough for 25 seats, five short of making Hermanson premier. This was mainly because it was almost nonexistent in the province's more urban areas; it was completely shut out in Regina and won only one seat in Saskatoon.

The NDP was able to continue to govern with the support of some Liberal Members of the Legislative Assembly (MLAs).

Some NDP members unhappy with the government of Roy Romanow left to form the New Green Alliance, an environmentalist party. This party won about 1% of the popular vote, and no seats in the legislature.

What remained of the Progressive Conservatives fielded 14 paper candidates – all in NDP strongholds – in order to preserve their status as a registered political party. The Tories did not actively campaign and won only a few votes.

To date, this is the most recent general election to return MLAs who were members of neither the NDP nor the Saskatchewan Party.

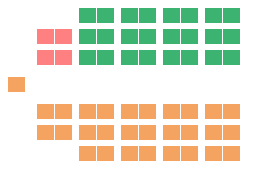
Seating Plan After the Election

== Opinion polls ==
Evolution of voting intentions at provincial level
Polling firm	Last day of survey	Source	SNDP	SP	SLP	NGA	PCPS	Other	ME	Sample
Election 1999	September 16, 1999		38.73	39.61	20.15	1.01	0.40	0.10		
Feedback Research	September 12, 1999		43	37	18	—N/a	—N/a	—N/a	3.2	1,000
UCAL Management Consultants	September 10, 1999		50	29	19	3	—N/a	—N/a	3.1	1,003
Angus Reid	September 2, 1999		47	35	14	2	—N/a	2	3.5	800
UCAL Management Consultants	August 26, 1999		48.9	30.4	18.9	—N/a	—N/a	—N/a	3.1	1,004
Saskatchewan Party founded (August 8, 1997)
Compas	April 28, 1996		47	—N/a	18	—N/a	25	—N/a	10	100
Election 1995	June 21, 1995		47.21	—	34.70	—	17.92	0.17		

== Results ==
Party	Party leader	# of candidates	Seats				Popular vote		
Party	Party leader	# of candidates	1995	Dissolution	Elected	% Change	#	%	% Change
New Democratic	Roy Romanow	58	42	43	29	-32.6%	157,046	38.73%	-8.48%
Saskatchewan Party	Elwin Hermanson	58	*	10	25^{1}	*	160,603	39.61%	*
Liberal	Jim Melenchuk	58	11	5	4^{1}	-72.7%	81,694	20.15%	-14.55%
New Green	Neil Sinclair	16	*	–	–	*	4,101	1.01%	*
Progressive Conservative	Iris Dennis	14	5	–	–	-100%	1,609	0.40%	-17.52%
Independent		2	–	–	–	–	422	0.10%	-0.07%
Total		206	58	58	58^{1}	–	405,475	100%	
Source: Elections Saskatchewan

Notes: * Party did not nominate candidates in previous election. ^{1} One constituency – Wood River – was initially won by the Liberals, but the result was overturned by the courts. The Saskatchewan Party won the ensuing by-election.

=== Percentages ===
Popular vote
Saskatchewan	39.61%
New Democratic	38.73%
Liberal	20.15%
Others	1.51%

Seats summary
New Democratic	50.00%
Saskatchewan	43.10%
Liberal	6.90%

=== Ranking ===
Party	Seats	Second	Third	Fourth	Fifth
New Democratic Party	29	24	5	0	0
Saskatchewan Party	25	23	8	2	0
Liberal Party	4	11	45	0	0
New Green	0	0	0	15	1
Progressive Conservative	0	0	0	7	7
Independent	0	0	0	2	0

=== 8 closest ridings ===
1. Wood River: Yogi Huyghebaert (SK Party) def. Glen McPherson (Lib) by 7 votes^{1}
2. Saskatoon Southeast: Pat Lorje (NDP) def. Grant Karwacki (Lib) by 38 votes
3. Regina Wascana Plains: Doreen Hamilton (NDP) def. Dan Thibault (SK Party) by 119 votes
4. Saskatoon Northwest: Jim Melenchuk (Lib) def. Grant Whitmore (NDP) by 127 votes
5. Saskatchewan Rivers: Daryl Wiberg (SK Party) def. Jack Langford (NDP) by 156 votes
6. Shellbrook-Spiritwood: Denis Allchurch (SK Party) def. Lloyd Johnson (NDP) by 301 votes
7. Yorkton: Clay Serby (NDP) def. Lorne Gogal (SK Party) by 306 votes
8. Meadow Lake: Maynard Sonntag (NDP) def. Bob Young (SK Party) by 323 votes

Notes: ^{1} see below under "Wood River controversy"

== Riding results ==
People in bold represent cabinet ministers and the Speaker. Party leaders are italicized. The symbol " ** " represents MLAs who are not running again.

=== Northwest Saskatchewan ===
Electoral District	Candidates				Incumbent
Electoral District	New Democratic	Saskatchewan Party	Liberal	New Green Alliance	Incumbent
Athabasca	Buckley Belanger; 2,512	Bert Roach; 76	Allan Adam; 389		Buckley Belanger
Battleford-Cut Knife	Sharon Murrell; 2,438	Rudi Peters; 3,107	Gary McArthur; 1,242		Sharon Murrell
Lloydminster	Violet Stanger; 2,135	Milton Wakefield; 2,928	Larry Ingram; 458		Violet Stanger
Meadow Lake	Maynard Sonntag; 2,846	Bob Young; 2,523	Don Coupland; 722		Maynard Sonntag
North Battleford	Kim Newsham; 2,672	Josiah Rise; 1,026	Jack Hillson; 3,478		Jack Hillson
Redberry Lake	Walter Jess; 2,444	Randy Weekes; 3,860	Harry Lewchuk; 1,082	Ivan Olynyk; 162	Walter Jess
Rosthern	Nadia Willard; 1,828	Ben Heppner; 4,331	Warren McCloud; 690		Ben Heppner
Shellbrook-Spiritwood	Lloyd Johnson; 2,594	Denis Allchurch; 2,895	Walter Krushelniski; 1,223		Lloyd Johnson

=== Northeast Saskatchewan ===
Electoral District	Candidates				Incumbent
Electoral District	New Democratic	Saskatchewan Party	Liberal	Progressive Conservative	Incumbent
Carrot River Valley	Andy Renaud; 2,803	Carl Kwiatkowski; 3,582	Ron Wassill; 667		Andy Renaud
Cumberland	Keith Goulet; 2,402	Don Johannesson; 336	Winston McKay; 627	Quentin Agnew; 117	Keith Goulet
Melfort-Tisdale	Carol Carson; 2,489	Rod Gantefoer; 4,096	Ken Magnus; 1,310		Rod Gantefoer
Prince Albert Carlton	**Myron Kowalsky**; 3,157	Bert Provost; 1,742	Dan Pinto; 943		Myron Kowalsky
Prince Albert Northcote	Eldon Lautermilch; 2,485	Pauline Provost; 754	Jim Stiglitz; 1,632	Kevin Shiach; 135	Eldon Lautermilch
Saskatchewan Rivers	Jack Langford; 2,892	Daryl Wiberg; 3,048	Stan Kowal; 852		Jack Langford

=== East Central Saskatchewan ===
Electoral District	Candidates				Incumbent
Electoral District	New Democratic	Saskatchewan Party	Liberal	Other	Incumbent
Canora-Pelly	Bill Dodge; 2,195	Ken Krawetz; 4,529	Richard McLeod; 935	David Sawkiw (Ind.); 127	Ken Krawetz
Humboldt	Armand Roy; 2,978	Arlene Julé; 3,821	Joanne Perreault; 1,459	Ron Schriml (NGA); 250	Arlene Julé
Kelvington-Wadena	Doug Still; 2,152	June Draude; 5,045	Sean Macknak; 488		June Draude
Last Mountain-Touchwood	Dale Flavel; 2,909	Glen Hart; 3,816	Ken Kluz; 1,363		Dale Flavel
Watrous	Eric Upshall; 2,928	Donna Harpauer; 3,572	Ray Hall; 1,437		Eric Upshall
Yorkton	Clay Serby; 2,893	Lorne Gogal; 2,587	Richard Yaholnitsky; 1,578		Clay Serby

=== Southwest Saskatchewan ===
Electoral District	Candidates				Incumbent
Electoral District	New Democratic	Saskatchewan Party	Liberal	Other	Incumbent
Arm River	Ron Bishoff; 2,110	Greg Brkich; 3,696	Harvey McLane; 2,624		Harvey McLane
Cypress Hills	Keith Murch; 1,368	Wayne Elhard; 4,138	Barry Thienes; 1,097		Wayne Elhard^{1}
Kindersley	Bill Rosher; 1,444	Bill Boyd; 4,491	Vaughn Biberdorf; 1,140		Bill Boyd
Moose Jaw North	Glenn Hagel; 3,451	Alene Tanner; 2,772	Tatum Benz; 591		Glenn Hagel
Moose Jaw Wakamow	Deb Higgins; 3,111	Doris Dunphy; 1,892	Marlin Belt; 668	Vanessa Slater (PC); 99	Lorne Calvert**
Rosetown-Biggar	Berny Wiens; 2,801	Elwin Hermanson; 4,907	John Hendrickson; 548	Rick Barsky (NGA); 75	Berny Wiens
Swift Current	John Wall; 2,538	Brad Wall; 4,600	Rhonda Thompson; 1,269		John Wall
Thunder Creek	Ivan Costley; 1,496	Lyle Stewart; 3,969	Gerard Aldridge; 2,031		Gerard Aldridge
Wood River^{2}	Robert Anderson; 1,608	Yogi Huyghebaert; 3,139	Glen McPherson; 3,132		Glen McPherson

==== Notes ====
1. Elhard was elected to the Legislature as a member of the Saskatchewan Party in a June 1999 by-election following the resignation and eventual conviction of former PC MLA Jack Goohsen.
2. see below under Wood River controversy

=== Southeast Saskatchewan ===
Electoral District	Candidates				Incumbent
Electoral District	New Democratic	Saskatchewan Party	Liberal	New Green Alliance	Incumbent
Cannington	Glen Lawson; 1,104	Dan D'Autremont; 5,671	Joanne Johnston; 798		Dan D'Autremont
Estevan	Larry Ward; 1,484	Doreen Eagles; 3,577	Neil Collins; 2,440	Sigfredo Gonzalez; 130	Larry Ward
Indian Head-Milestone	Lorne Scott; 2,305	Don McMorris; 3,877	Larry Schultz; 1,693	Garth Herman; 187	Lorne Scott
Melville	Michael Fisher; 2,056	Garry Hoffman; 2,165	Ron Osika; 3,419		Ron Osika
Moosomin	John McCormick; 1,604	Don Toth; 4,669	John Van Eaton; 1,539		Don Toth
Saltcoats	Leo Fuhr; 1,884	Bob Bjornerud; 4,688	Vic Polsom; 933		Bob Bjonerud
Weyburn-Big Muddy	Judy Bradley; 2,899	Brenda Bakken; 4,015	Joseph Weisgerber; 1,373		Judy Bradley

=== Saskatoon ===
Electoral District	Candidates					Incumbent
Electoral District	New Democratic	Saskatchewan Party	Liberal	New Green Alliance	Progressive Conservative	Incumbent
Saskatoon Eastview	Judy Junor; 3,644	Francis Kreiser; 2,646	Bernie Yuzdepski; 1,722	Sandy Ervin; 366		Judy Junor
Saskatoon Fairview	Chris Axworthy; 2,653	Sandra Rees; 1,137	Barry Anderson; 649	Lynn Oliphant; 89	Gwen Katzman; 153	Chris Axworthy
Saskatoon Greystone	Peter Prebble; 3,630	John Brennan; 2,501	Peter Stroh; 1,454			Lynda Haverstock**
Saskatoon Idylwyld	Janice MacKinnon; 3,144	Martin Boser; 1,333	Tim Ponto; 977	Maisie Shiell; 258	Kenneth J. Klassen; 122	Janice MacKinnon
Saskatoon Meewasin	Carolyn Jones; 3,588	Rodger Broadhead; 2,863	Paul Prisciak; 1,374	David Greenfield; 294		Carol Teichrob**
Saskatoon Mount Royal	Eric Cline; 3,523	Tyson Delorme; 1,280	Myron Luczka; 1,187		Kirk Eggum; 89	Eric Cline
Saskatoon Northwest	Grant Whitmore; 2,236	Jerry Ehalt; 1,912	Jim Melenchuk; 2,363			Grant Whitmore
Saskatoon Nutana	Pat Atkinson; 3,671	Terry Biddell; 1,472	George Haines; 1,068	Patrick L. Smith; 520	Dave Mathers; 75	Pat Atkinson
Saskatoon Riversdale	**Roy Romanow**; 3,130	Mark Coderre; 1,060	David Pillipow; 923	Neil Sinclair; 167	Glenn Schriener; 127	Roy Romanow
Saskatoon Southeast	Pat Lorje; 3,172	Dennis Reaburn; 1,987	Grant Karwacki; 3,134			Pat Lorje
Saskatoon Sutherland	Graham Addley; 3,234	Robin Bellamy; 2,778	Vernice McIntyre; 1,268			Mark Koenker**

=== Regina ===
Electoral District	Candidates						Incumbent
Electoral District	New Democratic	Saskatchewan Party	Liberal	New Green Alliance	Progressive Conservative	Other	Incumbent
Regina Centre	Joanne Crofford; 3,265	Ryan LeBlond; 926	Robert Jozsa; 1,362	Barb Markewich; 534	Kenneth R. Johnson; 177		Joanne Crofford
Regina Coronation Park	Kim Trew; 3,297	Lyle Hewitt; 1,517	Kathy Hill; 1,391		Ian Kimball; 112		Kim Trew
Regina Dewdney	Kevin Yates; 2,687	Brent Shirkey; 1,091	Hem Juttla; 1,500	Victor Lau; 294	Kristian Eggum; 130		Edwin Tchorzewski**
Regina Elphinstone	Dwain Lingenfelter; 2,689	Jo Ann Mohr; 1,168	Robert Ermel; 1,109	John Warnock; 243	Brenda Rossow; 56		Dwain Lingenfelter
Regina Lakeview	John Nilson; 4,207	Randall Edge; 1,741	Karen Pedersen; 2,173		Brad Johnson; 116	Wayne Gilmer (Ind.); 295	John Nilson
Regina Northeast	Ron Harper; 3,193	Yvonne Mackie; 1,566	John Patterson; 1,327				Edward Shillington**
Regina Qu'Appelle Valley	Mark Wartman; 3,641	Murray Hugel; 2,251	Reina Sinclair; 1,502				Suzanne Murray**
Regina Sherwood	Lindy Kasperski; 3,090	Arlene Bray; 1,549	Tom Crosby; 1,369		George Marcotte; 101		Lindy Kasperski
Regina South	Andrew Thomson; 3,324	Terri Harris; 2,533	David Huliyappa; 2,390	Peter Borch; 278			Andrew Thomson
Regina Victoria	Harry Van Mulligen; 3,231	Terry Wall; 1,690	John Knight; 1,608	Jim Elliott; 254			Harry Van Mulligen
Regina Wascana Plains	Doreen Hamilton; 3,758	Dan Thibault; 3,639	Adam Niesner; 1,943				Doreen Hamilton

== Wood River controversy ==
The Wood River electoral district in the wake of the 1999 general election endured a nine-month crisis where it went without representation. On election night returns came back in favour of Saskatchewan Party candidate Yogi Huyghebaert who defeated incumbent Glen McPherson by just seven votes in unofficial returns. The close election results were challenged in the courts.

After five months a judicial decision came down and the results were certified on January 27, 2000. Saskatchewan Liberal Party incumbent Glen McPherson was declared by a judge the winner by a single vote defeating Yogi Huyghebaert from the Saskatchewan Party. The Saskatchewan Party decided to challenge the judicial decision, and it was overturned and dissolved based on irregularities in the absentee ballots.

The seat was dissolved and a by-election was called by Premier Roy Romanow on May 29, 2000. McPherson did not run in the subsequent by-election, choosing to reject the NDP-Liberal coalition. His candidacy for the Liberal party was replaced by Gerry Ruehs. Huyghebaert ended up winning the by-election.

== See also ==
- List of political parties in Saskatchewan
- List of Saskatchewan provincial electoral districts
