= 23rd Saskatchewan Legislature =

Legislature of Saskatchewan, 1995–1999

The 23rd Legislative Assembly of Saskatchewan was elected in the 1995 Saskatchewan election. It was controlled by the New Democratic Party under Premier Roy Romanow.

The Liberal Party began this Legislative Assembly as the Official Opposition led by Lynda Haverstock. However, when the Saskatchewan Party was formed in 1997, it became the Official Opposition led by Ken Krawetz.

In the spring of 1999 Jack Goohsen was forced to resign as Cypress Hills MLA due to a criminal conviction on corruption charges. He was succeeded by Wayne Elhard of the Saskatchewan Party for the remaining year of the 23rd Assembly.

== Members elected ==
Names in bold represent party leaders and the Speaker.

District	Member	Party	First elected / previously elected	No.# of term(s)
Arm River	Harvey McLane	Liberal	1995	1st term
Athabasca	Buckley Belanger	Liberal	1995	1st term
Athabasca	Buckley Belanger	New Democrat	1995	1st term
Battleford-Cut Knife	Sharon Murrell	New Democrat	1995	1st term
Cannington	Dan D'Autremont	Progressive Conservative	1991	2nd term
Cannington	Dan D'Autremont	Saskatchewan Party	1991	2nd term
Canora-Pelly	**Ken Krawetz**	Liberal	1995	1st term
Canora-Pelly	**Ken Krawetz**	Saskatchewan Party	1995	1st term
Carrot River Valley	Andy Renaud	New Democrat	1991	2nd term
Cumberland	Keith Goulet	New Democrat	1986	3rd term
Cypress Hills	Jack Goohsen	Progressive Conservative	1991	2nd term
Cypress Hills	Jack Goohsen	Independent	1991	2nd term
Cypress Hills	Wayne Elhard (1999)	Saskatchewan Party	1999	1st term
Estevan	Larry Ward	New Democrat	1995	1st term
Humboldt	Arlene Julé	Liberal	1995	1st term
Humboldt	Arlene Julé	Independent	1995	1st term
Humboldt	Arlene Julé	Saskatchewan Party	1995	1st term
Indian Head-Milestone	Lorne Scott	New Democrat	1991	2nd term
Kelvington-Wadena	June Draude	Liberal	1995	1st term
Kelvington-Wadena	June Draude	Saskatchewan Party	1995	1st term
Kindersley	**Bill Boyd**	Progressive Conservative	1991	2nd term
Kindersley	**Bill Boyd**	Saskatchewan Party	1991	2nd term
Last Mountain-Touchwood	Dale Flavel	New Democrat	1991	2nd term
Lloydminster	Violet Stanger	New Democrat	1991	2nd term
Meadow Lake	Maynard Sonntag	New Democrat	1991	2nd term
Melfort-Tisdale	Rod Gantefoer	Liberal	1995	1st term
Melfort-Tisdale	Rod Gantefoer	Saskatchewan Party	1995	1st term
Melville	Ron Osika	Liberal	1995	1st term
Moose Jaw North	**Glenn Hagel**	New Democrat	1986	3rd term
Moose Jaw Wakamow	Lorne Calvert	New Democrat	1986	3rd term
Moosomin	Don Toth	Progressive Conservative	1986	3rd term
Moosomin	Don Toth	Saskatchewan Party	1986	3rd term
North Battleford	Douglas Anguish	New Democrat	1986	3rd term
North Battleford	Jack Hillson (1996)	Liberal	1996	1st term
Prince Albert Carlton	Myron Kowalsky	New Democrat	1986	3rd term
Prince Albert Northcote	Eldon Lautermilch	New Democrat	1986	3rd term
Redberry Lake	Walter Jess	New Democrat	1991	2nd term
Regina Centre	Joanne Crofford	New Democrat	1991	2nd term
Regina Coronation Park	Kim Trew	New Democrat	1986	3rd term
Regina Dewdney	Edwin Tchorzewski	New Democrat	1971, (Note: Humboldt) 1985	7th term*
Regina Dewdney	Kevin Yates (1999)	New Democrat	1999	1st term
Regina Elphinstone	Dwain Lingenfelter	New Democrat	1978, (Note: Shaunavon) 1988	5th term*
Regina Lakeview	John Nilson	New Democrat	1995	1st term
Regina Northeast	Edward Shillington	New Democrat	1975	6th term
Regina Qu'Appelle Valley	Suzanne Murray	New Democrat	1991	2nd term
Regina Sherwood	Lindy Kasperski	New Democrat	1995	1st term
Regina South	Andrew Thomson	New Democrat	1995	1st term
Regina Victoria	Harry Van Mulligen	New Democrat	1986	3rd term
Regina Wascana Plains	Doreen Hamilton	New Democrat	1991	2nd term
Rosetown–Biggar	Berny Wiens	New Democrat	1991	2nd term
Rosthern	Ben Heppner	Progressive Conservative	1995	1st term
Rosthern	Ben Heppner	Saskatchewan Party	1995	1st term
Saltcoats	Bob Bjornerud	Liberal	1995	1st term
Saltcoats	Bob Bjornerud	Saskatchewan Party	1995	1st term
Saskatchewan Rivers	Jack Langford	New Democrat	1991	2nd term
Saskatoon Eastview	Bob Pringle	New Democrat	1988	3rd term
Saskatoon Eastview	Judy Junor (1998)	New Democrat	1998	1st term
Saskatoon Fairview	Bob Mitchell	New Democrat	1986	3rd term
Saskatoon Fairview	Chris Axworthy (1999)	New Democrat	1999	1st term
Saskatoon Greystone	**Lynda Haverstock**	Liberal	1991	2nd term
Saskatoon Greystone	**Lynda Haverstock**	Independent	1991	2nd term
Saskatoon Idylwyld	Janice MacKinnon	New Democrat	1991	2nd term
Saskatoon Meewasin	Carol Teichrob	New Democrat	1991	2nd term
Saskatoon Mount Royal	Eric Cline	New Democrat	1991	2nd term
Saskatoon Northwest	Grant Whitmore	New Democrat	1991	2nd term
Saskatoon Nutana	Pat Atkinson	New Democrat	1986	3rd term
Saskatoon Riversdale	**Roy Romanow**	New Democrat	1967, 1986	7th term*
Saskatoon Southeast	Pat Lorje	New Democrat	1991	2nd term
Saskatoon Sutherland	Mark Koenker	New Democrat	1986	3rd term
Shellbrook-Spiritwood	Lloyd Johnson	New Democrat	1975, 1991	4th term*
Swift Current	John Wall	New Democrat	1995	1st term
Thunder Creek	Gerard Aldridge	Liberal	1995	1st term
Watrous	Eric Upshall	New Democrat	1986	3rd term
Weyburn-Big Muddy	Judy Bradley	New Democrat	1991	2nd term
Wood River	Glen McPherson	Liberal	1991 (Note: First elected as a New Democrat)	2nd term
Yorkton	Clay Serby	New Democrat	1991	2nd term
