= 1995 Saskatchewan general election =

Canadian provincial election

- June 21, 1995

58 seats in the Legislative Assembly of Saskatchewan 30 seats needed for a majority
- Turnout: 64.6% (▼18.6pp)
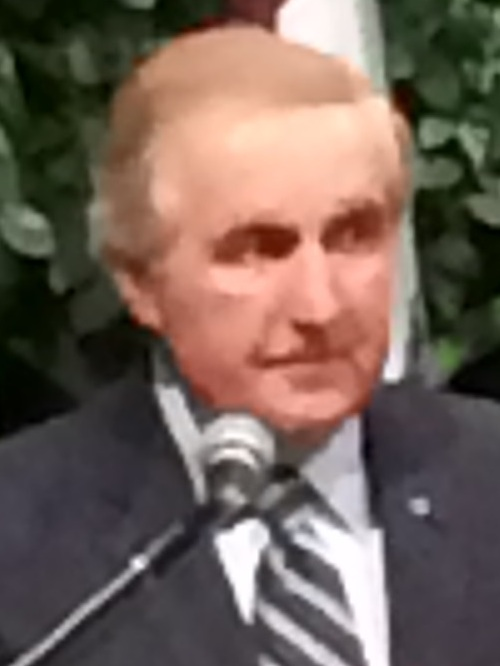

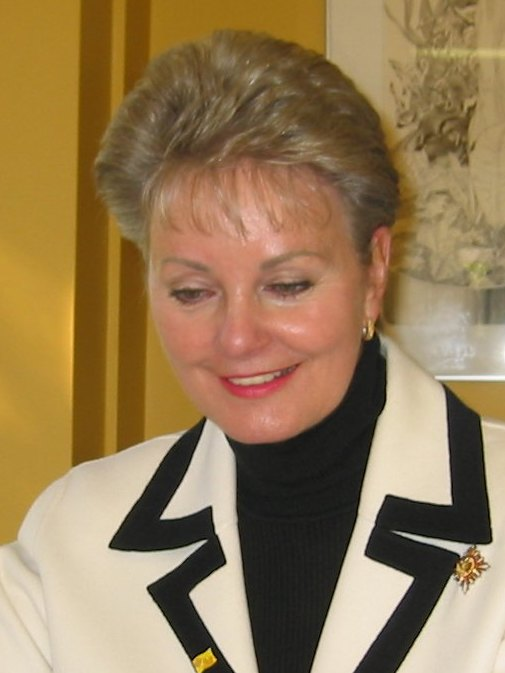
	First party	Second party	Third party
			PC
Leader	Roy Romanow	Lynda Haverstock	Bill Boyd
Party	New Democratic	Liberal	Progressive Conservative
Leader since	November 7, 1987	April 2, 1989	November 21, 1994
Leader's seat	Saskatoon Riversdale	Saskatoon Greystone	Kindersley
Last election	55	1	10
Seats before	54	2	10
Seats won	42	11	5
Seat change	▼12	▲9	▼5
Popular vote	193,053	141,873	73,269
Percentage	47.21%	34.70%	17.92%
Swing	▼3.84pp	▲11.41pp	▼7.62pp
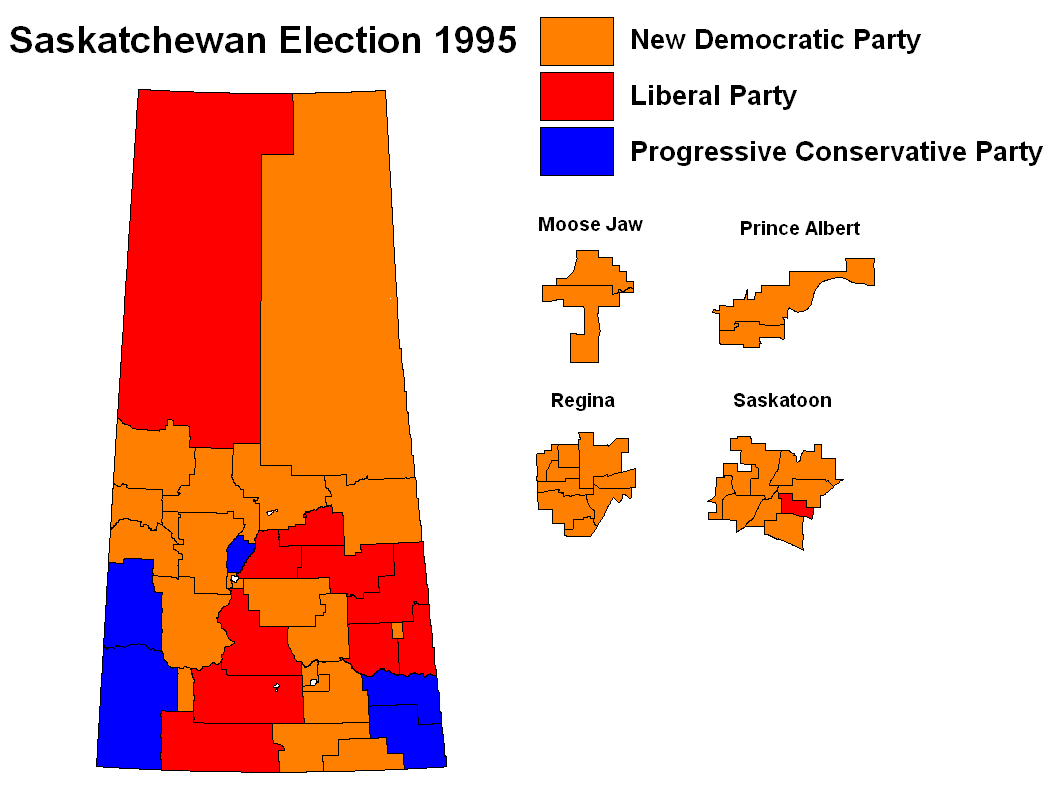
Premier before election
Roy Romanow
New Democratic
Premier after election
Roy Romanow
New Democratic

The 1995 Saskatchewan general election was held on June 21, 1995 to elect members of the Legislative Assembly of Saskatchewan.

The New Democratic Party government of Premier Roy Romanow was re-elected for a second term, although with a reduced majority.

The Liberal Party – led by Lynda Haverstock – increased its share of the popular vote; adding 9 seats in the legislature to the two seats it held previously, and became the official opposition.

Saskatchewan voters continued to punish the Progressive Conservative Party in the wake of prosecutions of former Progressive Conservative politicians for expense account fraud. Under the leadership of Bill Boyd the party continued to lose votes, and its caucus was reduced from 10 members to 5.

== Results ==
Party	Party leader	Candidates	Seats				Popular vote		
Party	Party leader	Candidates	1991	Dissol.	Elected	% Change	#	%	% Change
New Democratic	Roy Romanow	58	55	54	42	-22.2%	193,053	47.21%	-3.84%
Liberal	Lynda Haverstock	58	1	2	11	+550%	141,873	34.70%	+11.41%
Progressive Conservative	Bill Boyd	58	10	10	5	-50%	73,269	17.92%	-7.62%
Independent		4	–	–	–	–	712	0.17%	+0.06%
Total		178	66	66	58	-12.1%	408,907	100%	
Source: Elections Saskatchewan

=== Percentages ===
Popular vote
New Democratic	47.21%
Liberal	34.70%
PC	17.92%
Others	0.17%

Seats summary
New Democratic	72.41%
Liberal	18.97%
PC	8.62%

=== Ranking ===
Party	Seats	Second	Third	Fourth
New Democratic Party	42	12	4	0
Liberal Party	11	41	6	0
Progressive Conservative	5	5	47	1
Independent	0	0	1	3

=== 14 closest ridings ===
1. Canora-Pelly: Ken Krawetz (Lib) def. Ron Harper (NDP) by 50 votes
2. Kelvington-Wadena: June Draude (Lib) def. Darrel Cunningham (NDP) by 117 votes
3. Cypress Hills: Jack Gooshen (PC) def. Barry Thienes (Lib) by 143 votes
4. Athabasca: Buckley Belanger (Lib) def. Frederick John Thompson (NDP) by 159 votes
5. Humboldt: Arlene Julé (Lib) def. Armand Roy (NDP) by 204 votes
6. Shellbrook-Spiritwood: Lloyd Johnson (NDP) def. Bob Gerow (Lib) by 215 votes
7. Estevan: Larry Ward (NDP) def. Austin Gerein (Lib) by 233 votes
8. Lloydminster: Violet Stanger (NDP) def. Steven Turnbull (PC) by 266 votes
9. Saskatoon Northwest: Grant Whitmore (NDP) def. Jim Melenchuk (Lib) by 284 votes
10. Melville: Ron Osika (Lib) def. Evan Carlson (NDP) by 299 votes
11. Regina South: Andrew Thomson (NDP) def. Ross Keith (Lib) by 318 votes
12. Regina Wascana Plains: Doreen Hamilton (NDP) def. Leslie Anderson-Stodalka (Lib) by 335 votes
13. Indian Head-Milestone: Lorne Scott (NDP) def. Steve Helfrick (Lib) by 359 votes
14. Saskatoon Sutherland: Mark Koenker (NDP) def. Robin Bellamy (Lib) by 382 votes

== Riding results ==
People in bold represent cabinet ministers and the Speaker. Party leaders are italicized. The symbol " ** " represents MLAs who are not running again.

=== Northwest Saskatchewan ===
Electoral District	Candidates				Incumbent
Electoral District	NDP	Liberal	PC	Other	Incumbent
Athabasca	Frederick John Thompson; 1,188	Buckley Belanger; 1,347	Clay Poupart; 29	Jimmy Montgrand (Ind.); 390	Frederick John Thompson
Battleford-Cut Knife	Sharon Murrell; 2,961	Jock MacNeill; 2,184	Eileen Sword; 1,940	Leona Tootoosis (Ind.); 154	Violet Stanger; Cut Knife-Lloydminster
Lloydminster	Violet Stanger; 2,592	Donald C. Young; 1,010	Steven Turnbull; 2,326		New District
Meadow Lake	Maynard Sonntag; 2,910	Dennis Barnett; 2,188	Paul Popisil; 939		Maynard Sonntag
North Battleford	Doug Anguish; 4,005	Brodie Partington; 2,750	Corwyn Warwaruk; 682		Douglas Keith Anguish; The Battlefords
Redberry Lake	Walter Jess; 3,232	Richard Fyson; 2,162	Ron Meakin; 2,133		Walter Jess; Redberry
Rosthern	Colleen Parenteau; 1,764	Rob Friesen; 1,343	Ben Heppner; 3,079		William Neudorf**
Shellbrook-Spiritwood	Lloyd Johnson; 2,745	Bob Gerow; 2,530	Darren Hansen; 1,122		New District

=== Northeast Saskatchewan ===
Electoral District	Candidates				Incumbent
Electoral District	NDP	Liberal	PC	Other	Incumbent
Carrot River Valley	Andy Renaud; 3,238	Gary Broker; 2,692	Bob Ferguson; 1,558		Andy Renaud; Kelsey-Tisdale
Carrot River Valley	Andy Renaud; 3,238	Gary Broker; 2,692	Bob Ferguson; 1,558		Merged district
Carrot River Valley	Andy Renaud; 3,238	Gary Broker; 2,692	Bob Ferguson; 1,558		Tom Keeping**; Nipawin
Cumberland	Keith Goulet; 2,151	John Dorion; 580	Tyson Delorme; 161		Keith Goulet
Melfort-Tisdale	Carol Carson; 3,168	Rod Gantefoer; 3,882	Bill Ripley; 1,237		Carol Carson; Melfort
Prince Albert Carlton	Myron Kowalsky; 3,321	Anil Pandila; 1,973	Kris Eggum; 843		Myron Kowalsky
Prince Albert Northcote	Eldon Lautermilch; 2,926	Phil West; 1,293	John Fryters; 776		Eldon Lautermilch
Saskatchewan Rivers	Jack Langford; 3,199	Wyett Meyers; 2,178	Albert H. Provost; 1,373		Tom Keeping**; Nipawin
Saskatchewan Rivers	Jack Langford; 3,199	Wyett Meyers; 2,178	Albert H. Provost; 1,373		Merged district
Saskatchewan Rivers	Jack Langford; 3,199	Wyett Meyers; 2,178	Albert H. Provost; 1,373		Jack Langford; Shellbrook-Torch River

=== East Central Saskatchewan ===
Electoral District	Candidates				Incumbent
Electoral District	NDP	Liberal	PC	Other	Incumbent
Canora-Pelly	Ron Harper; 3,178	Ken Krawetz; 3,228	David Sawkiw; 1,584		Darrel Cunningham; Canora
Canora-Pelly	Ron Harper; 3,178	Ken Krawetz; 3,228	David Sawkiw; 1,584		Merged district
Canora-Pelly	Ron Harper; 3,178	Ken Krawetz; 3,228	David Sawkiw; 1,584		Ron Harper; Pelly
Humboldt	Armand Roy; 3,390	Arlene Julé; 3,594	David Leuschen; 1,202		Eric Upshall
Kelvington-Wadena	Darrel Cunningham; 3,177	June Draude; 3,294	Dwayne Evans; 1,153		Kenneth Kluz**
Last Mountain-Touchwood	Dale Flavel; 3,711	Pat Edenoste; 3,221	Wesley E. Chamberlin; 1,108		Dale Flavel
Watrous	Eric Upshall; 3,780	Bert Wilson; 2,810	Brad Cabana; 1,397		New District
Yorkton	Clay Serby; 3,588	David Bucsis; 2,791	Howard W. Evans; 860		Clay Serby

=== Southwest Saskatchewan ===
Electoral District	Candidates				Incumbent
Electoral District	NDP	Liberal	PC	Other	Incumbent
Arm River	Bob Robertson; 3,025	Harvey McLane; 4,093	Everett Ritson; 1,268		Gerald Muirhead**
Cypress Hills	Carl Wenaas; 1,890	Barry Thienes; 2,720	Jack Goohsen; 2,863		Jack Goohsen; Maple Creek
Cypress Hills	Carl Wenaas; 1,890	Barry Thienes; 2,720	Jack Goohsen; 2,863		Merged district
Cypress Hills	Carl Wenaas; 1,890	Barry Thienes; 2,720	Jack Goohsen; 2,863		Glen McPherson; Shaunavon
Kindersley	Mel Karlson; 1,915	Del Price; 1,938	Bill Boyd; 3,980		Bill Boyd
Moose Jaw North	**Glenn Hagel**; 4,067	John Morris; 2,033	John E. Langford; 1,031		Glenn Hagel; Moose Jaw Palliser
Moose Jaw Wakamow	Lorne Calvert; 3,803	Jim Carr; 1,577	Norma Donovan; 661		Lorne Calvert
Rosetown-Biggar	Berny Wiens; 3,445	Linda Trytten; 2,028	Ansgar Tynning; 2,697		Berny Wiens; Rosetown-Elrose
Rosetown-Biggar	Berny Wiens; 3,445	Linda Trytten; 2,028	Ansgar Tynning; 2,697		Merged district
Rosetown-Biggar	Berny Wiens; 3,445	Linda Trytten; 2,028	Ansgar Tynning; 2,697		Grant Whitmore; Biggar
Swift Current	John Wall; 3,515	Terry Brodziak; 2,137	Allan Bridal; 2,576		John Penner**
Thunder Creek	Lewis Draper; 2,353	Gerard Aldridge; 2,859	Janet Day; 2,414		Rick Swenson**
Wood River	Allen Willard Engel; 2,624	Glen McPherson; 4,146	Yogi Huyghebaert; 1,863		Lewis Draper; Assiniboia-Gravelbourg
Wood River	Allen Willard Engel; 2,624	Glen McPherson; 4,146	Yogi Huyghebaert; 1,863		Merged district
Wood River	Allen Willard Engel; 2,624	Glen McPherson; 4,146	Yogi Huyghebaert; 1,863		Glen McPherson; Shaunavon

=== Southeast Saskatchewan ===
Electoral District	Candidates				Incumbent
Electoral District	NDP	Liberal	PC	Other	Incumbent
Cannington	Gary Lake; 1,861	Don Lees; 2,359	Dan D'Autremont; 3,542		Dan D'Autremont; Souris-Cannington
Estevan	Larry Ward; 2,641	Austin Gerein; 2,408	David Davis; 2,367		Grant Devine**
Indian Head-Milestone	Lorne Scott; 3,440	Steve Helfrick; 3,081	Dale Paslawski; 1,396		Lorne Scott; Indian Head-Wolseley
Indian Head-Milestone	Lorne Scott; 3,440	Steve Helfrick; 3,081	Dale Paslawski; 1,396		Merged district
Indian Head-Milestone	Lorne Scott; 3,440	Steve Helfrick; 3,081	Dale Paslawski; 1,396		Judy Bradley; Bengough-Milestone
Melville	Evan Carlson; 2,975	**Ron Osika**; 3,274	Doug Gattinger; 1,566		Evan Carlson
Moosomin	Glen Gatin; 2,542	Vic Greenlaw; 2,070	Don Toth; 3,314		Don Toth
Saltcoats	Reg Knezacek; 3,053	Bob Bjornerud; 3,635	Ken Johnson; 1,295		Reg Knezacek
Weyburn-Big Muddy	Judy Bradley; 3,506	Hugh M. Kimball; 2,373	Brenda Bakken; 2,434		Ronald Wormsbecker**; Weyburn
Weyburn-Big Muddy	Judy Bradley; 3,506	Hugh M. Kimball; 2,373	Brenda Bakken; 2,434		Merged district
Weyburn-Big Muddy	Judy Bradley; 3,506	Hugh M. Kimball; 2,373	Brenda Bakken; 2,434		Judy Bradley; Bengough-Milestone

=== Saskatoon ===
Electoral District	Candidates				Incumbent
Electoral District	NDP	Liberal	PC	Other	Incumbent
Saskatoon Eastview	Bob Pringle; 4,738	Francis Kreiser; 3,072	Richard Bing-Wo; 699		Bob Pringle; Saskatoon Eastview-Haultain
Saskatoon Fairview	Bob Mitchell; 3,100	Vernice Loretta McIntyre; 1,191	Tom McConnell; 406	Helen Quewezance (Ind.); 88	Bob Mitchell
Saskatoon Greystone	Marjory Gammel; 3,519	Lynda Haverstock; 4,013	Gary Hellard; 636		Lynda Haverstock
Saskatoon Idylwyld	Janice MacKinnon; 4,064	Bonnye Georgia; 1,646	Kent Latimer; 757		Eric Cline
Saskatoon Meewasin	Carol Teichrob; 3,576	Betty Anne Latrace-Henderson; 2,511	Rhys Frostad; 887		Carol Teichrob; Saskatoon River Heights
Saskatoon Mount Royal	Eric Cline; 3,894	Maurice Vellacott; 1,732	Pat Bundrock; 539		Janice MacKinnon; Saskatoon Westmount
Saskatoon Northwest	Grant Whitmore; 2,776	Jim Melenchuk; 2,492	Nicholas Stooshinoff; 791		New District
Saskatoon Nutana	Pat Atkinson; 4,396	George Haines; 1,858	Kim Scruby; 528		Herman Rolfes**
Saskatoon Riversdale	**Roy Romanow**; 3,715	Fred Langford; 1,242	Jordon Cooper; 412	Eugene Pasap (Ind.); 80	Roy Romanow
Saskatoon Southeast	Pat Lorje; 3,450	Wallace Lockhart; 2,910	Marcel Guay; 682		Pat Lorje; Saskatoon Wildwood
Saskatoon Sutherland	Mark Koenker; 3,231	Robin Bellamy; 2,849	Tim McGillvray; 499		Mark Koenker; Saskatoon Sutherland-University

=== Regina ===
Electoral District	Candidates				Incumbent
Electoral District	NDP	Liberal	PC	Other	Incumbent
Regina Centre	Joanne Crofford; 4,373	Don Ross; 2,046	Geraldine Molloy; 506		Joanne Crofford; Regina Lake Centre
Regina Coronation Park	Kim Trew; 4,240	Clyde Myhill; 1,983	Roy Gaebell; 452		Kim Trew; Regina Albert North
Regina Dewdney	Edwin Tchorzewski; 4,037	John MacGowan; 1,366	Barry Bonneau; 426		Edwin Tchorzewski
Regina Elphinstone	Dwain Lingenfelter; 4,042	Gord Wasteste; 1,520	Jo Ann Mohr; 465		Dwain Lingenfelter
Regina Lakeview	John Nilson; 4,808	Garry Johnson; 3,356	Glenn Smith; 627		Rose Marie Simard**; Regina Hillsdale
Regina Northeast	Ned Shillington; 4,303	Lorne Bultitude; 1,980	Douglas Berlin; 416		Ned Shillington; Regina Churchill Downs
Regina Qu'Appelle Valley	Suzanne Murray; 3,697	Anita Bergman; 2,624	Alice Miazga; 378		Robert Llewellyn Lyons**; Regina Rosemont
Regina Qu'Appelle Valley	Suzanne Murray; 3,697	Anita Bergman; 2,624	Alice Miazga; 378		Merged district
Regina Qu'Appelle Valley	Suzanne Murray; 3,697	Anita Bergman; 2,624	Alice Miazga; 378		Suzanne Murray; Qu'Appelle-Lumsden
Regina Sherwood	Lindy Kasperski; 3,951	Frank Gribbon; 1,842	Thomas D. Durbin; 452		Anita Bergman; Regina North West
Regina South	Andrew Thomson; 4,139	Ross Keith; 3,821	John Weir; 643		Serge Kujawa**; Regina Albert South
Regina Victoria	Harry Van Mulligen; 4,294	Laura Ross; 2,479	Patricia Costanza; 563		Harry Van Mulligen
Regina Wascana Plains	Doreen Hamilton; 3,862	Leslie Anderson-Stodalka; 3,527	Bonnie Krajewski; 691		Doreen Hamilton

== See also ==
- List of political parties in Saskatchewan
- List of Saskatchewan provincial electoral districts
