= 2003 Saskatchewan general election =

Canadian provincial election

- November 5, 2003

58 seats in the Legislative Assembly of Saskatchewan 30 seats needed for a majority
- Turnout: 70.9% (▲5.4pp)
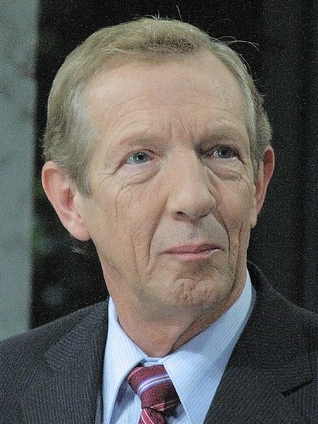

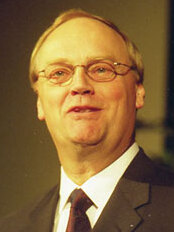
	First party	Second party	Third party
			LIB
Leader	Lorne Calvert	Elwin Hermanson	David Karwacki
Party	New Democratic	Saskatchewan	Liberal
Leader since	January 27, 2001	April 20, 1998	October 27, 2001
Leader's seat	Saskatoon Riversdale	Rosetown-Elrose	Ran in Saskatoon Meewasin (lost)
Last election	29	25	4
Seats before	28	26	1
Seats won	30	28	0
Seat change	▲2	▲2	▼4
Popular vote	190,923	168,144	60,601
Percentage	44.68%	39.35%	14.18%
Swing	▲5.95pp	▼0.26%	▼5.97pp
- Popular vote by riding. As this is an FPTP election, seat totals are not determined by popular vote, but instead via results by each riding.
Premier before election
Lorne Calvert
New Democratic
Premier after election
Lorne Calvert
New Democratic

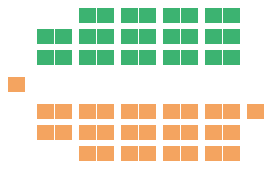
Seating Plan After the Election

The 2003 Saskatchewan general election was held on November 5, 2003, to elect the 58 members of the Legislative Assembly of Saskatchewan (MLAs). The election was called on October 8 by Lieutenant Governor of Saskatchewan Lynda Haverstock, on the advice of Premier Lorne Calvert.

As of 2026, this is the last time that the NDP won in Saskatchewan.

== Campaign ==
Going into the election, the popularity of the New Democratic Party of Saskatchewan (NDP) had declined because of several controversies. Voters in this agrarian province were disgruntled because of a mediocre harvest, a disastrous summer for cattle producers — the American border had been closed to Canadian beef due to fears of mad cow disease; and the actions of a member of the NDP Cabinet who was found to have misled the people of the province on the nature of the Saskatchewan Potato Utility Development Company ("SPUDCO") — a publicly owned potato company that was inappropriately characterized as a public-private partnership that went bust in 2000.

New Liberal leader David Karwacki was elected on a platform of disbanding the coalition with the NDP. After ordering Liberal MLAs to leave government, MLAs Ron Osika and Jim Melenchuk left the party and continued to sit in government before ultimately joining the NDP.calvert

Election issues included emigration (the province's population was falling because young people were leaving the province to look for work), honesty and integrity, privatization of public inter-city transit and energy supplies, and utility rates.

During the campaign, the NDP was attacked for an internal cartoon that had been leaked to the media. It depicted Saskatchewan Party leader Elwin Hermanson directing persons labeled 'NDP sympathizers' onto railway boxcars. The cartoon referred to speculation that, if elected, Hermanson would replace civil servants who were NDP supporters with Saskatchewan Party supporters. However, many associated it with the Holocaust – in particular Nazi Germany's deportation of Jews to concentration camps.

The campaign as a whole was seen as being quite negative, as the NDP constantly claimed that the Saskatchewan Party had a 'secret agenda' to privatize crown corporations to finance large tax cuts for business; the Saskatchewan Party had a difficult time refuting these claims, as several party members made comments that seemed consistent with this view.

Unlike many of the other provincial elections held in 2003, the election was widely regarded as too close to call up until a large proportion of the polls had reported. To the surprise of observers who believed the NDP would be affected by the poor pre-election conditions, the NDP won its fourth term in government. It actually picked up the one seat it needed for a bare majority. The election was ultimately decided in Regina Wascana Plains, which the NDP won by only 543 votes. Had the Saskatchewan Party won here, both parties would have had 29 seats each. All of the NDP's ministers were re-elected; except for two who had defected to the party from the Liberals.

The Saskatchewan Party cemented its grip on most of the rural seats, yet was unable to make further gains in urban areas. It won two additional seats in Saskatoon, but was completely shut out in Regina (though as mentioned above it nearly won Regina Wascana Plains). Believing he had taken the party as far as he could, Hermanson resigned as leader on November 18, 2003.

Although speculation was high that they could form the balance of power in the case of a minority government, the Liberals lost their one seat, shutting them out of the legislature for the first time since 1982. They would never again return to the legislature — in 2023 they re-branded as the Saskatchewan Progress Party.

== Results ==
Party	Party leader	# of candidates	Seats				Popular vote		
Party	Party leader	# of candidates	1999	Dissol.	Elected	% Change	#	%	% Change
New Democratic	Lorne Calvert	58	29	28	30	+7.2%	190,923	44.68%	+5.95%
Saskatchewan Party	Elwin Hermanson	58	25	26	28	+7.7%	168,144	39.35%	-0.26%
Liberal	David Karwacki	58	4	1	–	-100%	60,601	14.18%	-5.97%
Western Independence	Bruce Ritter	17	*	–	–	*	2,615	0.61%	*
New Green	Ben Webster	27	–	–	–	–	2,323	0.55%	-0.46%
Independent		5	–	3	–	-100%	1,997	0.47%	+0.37%
Progressive Conservative	Iris Dennis	11	–	–	–	–	681	0.16%	-0.24
Total		234	58	58	58		427,284	100%	
Source: Elections Saskatchewan

Note: * Party did not nominate candidates in previous election.

=== Percentages ===
Popular vote
New Democratic	44.68%
Saskatchewan	39.35%
Liberal	14.18%
Others	1.79%

Seats summary
New Democratic	51.72%
Saskatchewan	48.28%

=== Ranking ===
Party	Seats	Second	Third	Fourth	Fifth	Sixth
New Democratic Party	30	28	0	0	0	0
Saskatchewan Party	28	26	4	0	0	0
Liberal Party	0	4	53	1	0	0
New Green	0	0	0	21	6	0
Western Independence	0	0	0	14	2	1
Progressive Conservative	0	0	0	6	5	0
Independent	0	0	1	2	2	0

=== 6 closest constituencies ===
1. Lloydminster: Milt Wakefield (SK Party) def. Wayne Byers (NDP) by 64 votes
2. Humboldt: Donna Harpauer (SK Party) def. Bryan Barnes (NDP) by 173 votes
3. Saskatoon Northwest: Ted Merriman (SK Party) def. Jim Melenchuk (Ind.-NDP) by 266 votes
4. Carrot River Valley: Allan Kerpan (SK Party) def. Mark Pitzel (NDP) by 360 votes
5. Weyburn-Big Muddy: Brenda Bakken (SK Party) def. Sherry Leach (NDP) by 385 votes
6. Meadow Lake: Maynard Sonntag (NDP) def. Ron Dosdall (SK Party) by 414 votes

== Riding-by-riding results ==
People in bold represent cabinet ministers and the Speaker. Party leaders are italicized. The symbol " ** " represents MLAs who are not running again.

=== Northwest Saskatchewan ===
Electoral District	Candidates					Incumbent
Electoral District	New Democratic	Saskatchewan Party	Liberal	Western Independence	Progressive Conservative	Incumbent
Athabasca	Buckley Belanger; 2,508 (70.67%)	Greg Ross; 806 (22.71%)	Philip Derocher; 212 (5.97%)		Sean Gilchrist; 23 (0.65%)	Buckley Belanger
Cut Knife-Turtleford	John Vinek; 2,520 (39.02%)	Michael Chisholm; 3,114 (48.21%)	Larry Ingram; 649 (10.05%)	Josiah Rise; 176 (2.72%)		Wally Lorenz**; Battleford-Cut Knife
Lloydminster	Wayne Byers; 1,926 (47.98%)	Milt Wakefield; 1,990 (49.58%)	Richard Sparks; 98 (2.44%)			Milt Wakefield
Meadow Lake	Maynard Sonntag; 3,472 (50.27%)	Ron Dosdall; 3,058 (44.27%)	Don Coupland; 377(5.46%)			Maynard Sonntag
Rosthern-Shellbrook	John Serhienko; 2,598 (36.54%)	Denis Allchurch; 3,604 (50.69%)	George Cameron; 747 (10.51%)	Laverne Isaac; 161 (2.26%)		Ben Heppner; Rosthern
Rosthern-Shellbrook	John Serhienko; 2,598 (36.54%)	Denis Allchurch; 3,604 (50.69%)	George Cameron; 747 (10.51%)	Laverne Isaac; 161 (2.26%)		Merged district
Rosthern-Shellbrook	John Serhienko; 2,598 (36.54%)	Denis Allchurch; 3,604 (50.69%)	George Cameron; 747 (10.51%)	Laverne Isaac; 161 (2.26%)		Denis Allchurch; Shellbrook-Spiritwood
The Battlefords	Len Taylor; 3,056 (42.53%)	Larry Doke; 1,856 (25.83%)	Jack Hillson; 2,134 (29.70%)	Gordon Elias; 139 (1.94%)		Jack Hillson; North Battleford

=== Northeast Saskatchewan ===
Electoral District	Candidates					Incumbent
Electoral District	New Democratic	Saskatchewan Party	Liberal	New Green Alliance	Other	Incumbent
Batoche	Ava Bear; 2,778 (36.32%)	Delbert Kirsch; 3,356 (43.87%)	Bill Yeaman; 1,300 (16.99%)	Gordon Robert Dumont; 76 (0.99%)	Florence Rabut (WIP); 140 (1.83%)	New District
Canora-Pelly	Brian Rusnak; 3,008 (37.80%)	Ken Krawetz; 4,198 (52.75%)	Arlene Cote; 580 (7.29%)		David Sawkiw (WIP); 172 (2.16%)	Ken Krawetz
Carrot River Valley	Mark Pitzel; 3,114 (42.02%)	Allan Kerpan; 3,474 (46.88%)	Kathy McIntyre; 823 (11.10%)			Allan Kerpan
Cumberland	Joan Beatty; 3,281 (68.96%)	Winston McKay; 1,035 (21.75%)	Allan Adam; 388 (8.16%)		Ari Avivi (PC); 54 (1.13%)	Keith Goulet**
Kelvington-Wadena	Ryan Calder; 2,461 (31.43%)	June Draude; 4,515 (57.66%)	Harry Kerr; 542 (6.92%)		Neil Fenske (WIP); 312 (3.99%)	June Draude
Melfort	Garnet Davis; 2,833 (38.25%)	Rod Gantefoer; 4,060 (54.82%)	Bernie Yuzdepski; 513 (6.93%)			Rod Gantefoer; Melfort-Tisdale
Prince Albert Carlton	**Myron Kowalsky**; 3,865 (58.59%)	Bert Provost; 1,891 (28.66%)	Carman Cripps; 744 (11.28%)	Jayna Lacey; 71 (1.08%)	Davey Clinton (Ind.); 26 (0.39%)	**Myron Kowalsky**
Prince Albert Northcote	Eldon Lautermilch; 3,286 (56.89%)	Peter Abrametz; 1,554 (28.90%)	Brent Zbaraschuk; 783 (13.56%)	Ben Webster; 153 (2.65%)		Eldon Lautermilch
Saskatchewan Rivers	Lon Borgerson; 3,446 (47.65%)	Daryl Wiberg; 2,833 (39.27%)	Cliff Rose; 765 (10.58%)	Gerald Regnitter; 188 (2.60%)		Daryl Wiberg

=== West Central Saskatchewan ===
Electoral District	Candidates					Incumbent
Electoral District	New Democratic	Saskatchewan Party	Liberal	Western Independence	Other	Incumbent
Arm River-Watrous	Carol Rowan; 3,193 (38.23%)	Greg Brkich; 4,009 (48.01%)	Steven Barlow; 922 (11.04%)	Gord Anderson; 162 (1.94%)	Gord Pederson (Ind.); 65 (0.78%)	Greg Brkich; Arm River
Arm River-Watrous	Carol Rowan; 3,193 (38.23%)	Greg Brkich; 4,009 (48.01%)	Steven Barlow; 922 (11.04%)	Gord Anderson; 162 (1.94%)	Gord Pederson (Ind.); 65 (0.78%)	Merged district
Arm River-Watrous	Carol Rowan; 3,193 (38.23%)	Greg Brkich; 4,009 (48.01%)	Steven Barlow; 922 (11.04%)	Gord Anderson; 162 (1.94%)	Gord Pederson (Ind.); 65 (0.78%)	Donna Harpauer; Watrous
Biggar	Lee Pearce; 2,639 (36.11%)	Randy Weekes; 3,917 (53.61%)	Steven Dribnenki; 751 (10.28%)			Randy Weekes; Redberry Lake
Humboldt	Bryan Barnes; 3,291 (39.89%)	Donna Harpauer; 3,464 (41.99%)	Les Alm; 1,495 (18.12%)	~~Del Anderson~~; ~~138~~		Arlene Julé**
Kindersley	Blair McDaid; 1,443 (22.05%)	Jason Dearborn; 3,960 (60.50%)	Del Price; 1,142 (17.45%)			Jason Dearborn
Martensville	Zane Dmytryshyn; 1,836 (26.87%)	Ben Heppner; 3,778 (55.28%)	Allan Earle; 1,135 (16.61%)	Warren Fehr; 85 (1.24%)		Ben Heppner; Rosthern
Rosetown-Elrose	Jack Randall Mason; 2,200 (27.06%)	Elwin Hermanson; 5,173 (63.62%)	Janay Volk; 758 (9.32%)			Elwin Hermanson; Rosetown-Biggar

=== Southwest Saskatchewan ===
Electoral District	Candidates					Incumbent
Electoral District	New Democratic	Saskatchewan Party	Liberal	Western Independence	New Green Alliance	Incumbent
Cypress Hills	Eric August; 1,418 (20.81%)	Wayne Elhard; 4,458 (65.42%)	Barry Thienes; 938 (13.77%)			Wayne Elhard
Moose Jaw North	Glenn Hagel; 4,580 (57.86%)	Darin Chow; 2,838 (35.85%)	Dean Legaré; 431 (5.44%)		Michael Wright; 67 (0.85%)	Glenn Hagel
Moose Jaw Wakamow	Deb Higgins; 4,394 (62.60%)	Gwen Beitel; 2,129 (30.33%)	Robert Cosman; 429 (6.11%)		Marcella Gall; 67 (0.96%)	Deb Higgins
Swift Current	Dean Smith; 2,707 (36.64%)	Brad Wall; 4,312 (58.37%)	Mike Burton; 369 (4.99%)			Brad Wall
Thunder Creek	Larry Hall; 2,572 (30.92%)	Lyle Stewart; 4,450 (53.50%)	Rod Haugerud; 1,132 (13.61%)	Harold Stephan; 164 (1.97%)		Lyle Stewart
Wood River	Trevor Davies; 2,043 (25.98%)	Yogi Huyghebaert; 4,350 (55.32%)	Louis Stringer; 1,264 (16.07%)	Nick Yorga; 207 (2.63%)		Yogi Huyghebaert

=== Southeast Saskatchewan ===
Electoral District	Candidates					Incumbent
Electoral District	New Democratic	Saskatchewan Party	Liberal	Western Independence	Other	Incumbent
Cannington	Henry Friesen; 1,569 (21.70%)	Dan D'Autremont; 5,115 (70.74%)	John Atwell; 547 (7.56%)			Dan D'Autremont
Estevan	David Pattyson; 2,154 (31.39%)	Doreen Eagles; 3,522 (51.32%)	Tim Seipp; 1,095 (15.96%)		Sigfredo Gonzales (NGA); 91 (1.33%)	Doreen Eagles
Indian Head-Milestone	Lorne Scott; 3,258 (39.43%)	Don McMorris; 4,070 (49.26%)	Anthony Gavrielides; 724 (8.76%)	Ron Borys; 211 (2.55%)		Don McMorris
Last Mountain-Touchwood	Jordon Hillier; 3,055 (39.75%)	Glen Hart; 3,722 (48.42%)	Greg Burton; 704 (9.16%)	Merv Werk; 205 (2.67%)		Glen Hart
Melville-Saltcoats	Ron Osika; 2,858 (32.20%)	Bob Bjornerud; 3,462 (39.01%)	Brian Tochor; 880 (9.92%)		Grant Schmidt (Ind.); 1,675 (18.87%)	Ron Osika; Melville
Melville-Saltcoats	Ron Osika; 2,858 (32.20%)	Bob Bjornerud; 3,462 (39.01%)	Brian Tochor; 880 (9.92%)		Grant Schmidt (Ind.); 1,675 (18.87%)	Merged district
Melville-Saltcoats	Ron Osika; 2,858 (32.20%)	Bob Bjornerud; 3,462 (39.01%)	Brian Tochor; 880 (9.92%)		Grant Schmidt (Ind.); 1,675 (18.87%)	Bob Bjornerud; Saltcoats
Moosomin	Robert Stringer; 2,268 (30.89%)	Don Toth; 4,400 (59.92%)	Bryn Hirsch; 506 (6.89%)	Frank Serfas; 169 (2.30%)		Don Toth
Weyburn-Big Muddy	Sherry Leach; 3,491 (40.64%)	Brenda Bakken; 3,876 (45.12%)	Janet Ledingham; 1,223 (14.24%)			Brenda Bakken
Yorkton	Clay Serby; 3,993 (51.53%)	Randy Atkinson; 3,163 (40.82%)	Chuck Gunning; 371 (4.79%)	Bruce Ritter; 222 (2.86%)		Clay Serby

=== Saskatoon ===
Electoral District	Candidates					Incumbent
Electoral District	New Democratic	Saskatchewan Party	Liberal	New Green Alliance	Progressive Conservative	Incumbent
Saskatoon Centre	David Forbes; 3,607 (61.85%)	Roger Parent; 1,165 (19.98%)	Richard Clatney; 907 (15.55%)		Betty Korkin; 153 (2.62%)	David Forbes; Saskatoon Idylwyld
Saskatoon Eastview	Judy Junor; 4,164 (44.64%)	Robin Bellamy; 2,572 (27.57%)	Rob Norris; 2,482 (26.61%)	Sandy Ervin; 110 (1.18%)		Judy Junor
Saskatoon Fairview	Andy Iwanchuk; 3,105 (55.28%)	Jim McAllister; 1,383 (24.62%)	Rik Steernburg; 1,037 (18.46%)	Jason Hanson; 41 (0.73%)	Gwen Katzman; 51 (0.91%)	Andy Iwanchuk
Saskatoon Greystone	Peter Prebble; 4,317 (49.16%)	Kevin Waugh; 2,855 (32.51%)	Herta Barron; 1,558 (17.74%)	Brian Berezowski; 50 (0.59%)		Peter Prebble
Saskatoon Massey Place	Eric Cline; 4,023 (61.40%)	Philipp Strenger; 1,413 (21.57%)	Myron Luzkca; 970 (14.80%)	Ryan John Taylor; 61 (0.93%)	David Connor; 85 (1.30%)	Eric Cline; Saskatoon Mount Royal
Saskatoon Meewasin	Frank Quennell; 3,256 (40.88%)	Shelley Hengen; 1,989 (24.98%)	David Karwacki; 2,642 (33.17%)	David Greenfield; 77 (0.97%)		Carolyn Jones**
Saskatoon Northwest	Jim Melenchuk; 2,943 (37.35%)	Ted Merriman; 3,209 (40.72%)	Ken McDonough; 1,728 (21.93%)			Jim Melenchuk
Saskatoon Nutana	Pat Atkinson; 4,593 (55.47%)	Sandy Ewert; 1,549 (18.71%)	Grant Karwacki; 1,946 (23.50%)	Neal Anderson; 192 (2.32%)		Pat Atkinson
Saskatoon Riversdale	**Lorne Calvert**; 3,608 (62.72%)	Fred Ozirney; 1,302 (22.63%)	Deneen Gudjonson; 754 (13.11%)	Keith Morvick; 52 (0.90%)	Glen Schreiner; 37 (0.64%)	**Lorne Calvert**
Saskatoon Silver Springs	Russell Scott; 3,490 (38.99%)	Ken Cheveldayoff; 4,005 (44.74%)	Shawn Flett; 1,457 (16.27%)			New District
Saskatoon Southeast	John Conway; 2,738 (32.96%)	Don Morgan; 3,355 (40.38%)	Zoria Broughton; 2,164 (26.05%)	Neil Sinclair; 51 (0.61%)		Pat Lorje**
Saskatoon Sutherland	Graham Addley; 3,616 (46.59%)	Patrick Bundrock; 2,043 (26.32%)	Mark Kelleher; 1,988 (25.32%)	Lynn Oliphant; 114 (1.47%)		Graham Addley

=== Regina ===
Electoral District	Candidates						Incumbent
Electoral District	New Democratic	Saskatchewan Party	Liberal	New Green Alliance	Progressive Conservative	Other	Incumbent
Regina Coronation Park	Kim Trew; 4,439 (62.85%)	Robert Taylor; 1,665 (23.57%)	Edgar Sauer; 849 (12.02%)	Kim Weiss; 63 (0.89%)	Kenneth Johnson; 47 (0.67%)		Kim Trew
Regina Dewdney	Kevin Yates; 4,153 (55.08%)	Rob Bresciani; 2,148 (28.49%)	Simone Clayton; 1,165 (15.45%)	Darcy Robillard; 35 (0.46%)		Blaine Gilbertson (Ind.); 39 (0.52%)	Kevin Yates
Regina Douglas Park	Harry Van Mulligen; 5,136 (57.26%)	Laura Ross; 1,900 (21.18%)	Mike Farmer; 1,703 (18.99%)	Dave Orban; 148 (1.65%)	Wayne Mastrachuk; 83 (0.92%)		Harry Van Mulligen; Regina Victoria
Regina Elphinstone-Centre	Warren McCall; 3,078 (66.39%)	Angie Roe; 792 (17.09%)	Paul Compton; 574 (12.38%)	John Warnock; 110 (2.37%)	Janice Schreiner; 44 (0.95%)	Carl Barabonoff (WIP); 38 (0.82%)	Warren McCall; Regina Elphinstone
Regina Elphinstone-Centre	Warren McCall; 3,078 (66.39%)	Angie Roe; 792 (17.09%)	Paul Compton; 574 (12.38%)	John Warnock; 110 (2.37%)	Janice Schreiner; 44 (0.95%)	Carl Barabonoff (WIP); 38 (0.82%)	Merged district
Regina Elphinstone-Centre	Warren McCall; 3,078 (66.39%)	Angie Roe; 792 (17.09%)	Paul Compton; 574 (12.38%)	John Warnock; 110 (2.37%)	Janice Schreiner; 44 (0.95%)	Carl Barabonoff (WIP); 38 (0.82%)	Joanne Crofford; Regina Centre
Regina Lakeview	John Nilson; 4,988 (56.91%)	Michelle Hunter; 1,781 (20.32%)	Dave Brundige; 1,875 (21.39%)	Brian Rands; 121 (1.38%)			John Nilson
Regina Northeast	Ron Harper; 4,428 (61.30%)	Dwayne Walter; 1,637 (22.66%)	Dennis Hydamacka; 1,034 (14.31%)	Susan Ferren; 62 (0.86%)	George Marcotte; 63 (0.87%)		Ron Harper
Regina Qu'Appelle Valley	Mark Wartman; 4,694 (56.90%)	Darlene Hincks; 2,615 (31.70%)	Marlin Belt; 875 (10.60%)	Kelsey Pearson; 39 (0.47%)		Angela Barabonoff (WIP); 27 (0.33%)	Mark Wartman
Regina Rosemont	Joanne Crofford; 4,226 (62.05%)	Morris Elfenbaum; 1,477 (21.69%)	Sherry Banadyga; 990 (14.54%)	Victor Lau; 76 (1.12%)	Vanessa Slater; 41 (0.60%)		New District
Regina South	Andrew Thomson; 4,662 (49.47%)	Jim Roberts; 2,646 (28.08%)	Debbie Ward; 1,994 (21.16%)	Garry Ewart; 97 (1.03%)		Shea Ritter (WIP); 25 (0.26%)	Andrew Thomson
Regina Walsh Acres	Sandra Morin; 4,594 (62.85%)	Mike Shenher; 1,693 (23.16%)	Perry Juttla; 766 (10.48%)	Nigel Taylor; 64 (0.88%)		Lindy Kasperski (Ind.); 192 (2.63%)	Lindy Kasperski; Regina Sherwood
Regina Wascana Plains	Doreen Hamilton; 3,951 (43.38%)	Dan Thibault; 3,438 (37.75%)	Frank William Proto; 1,672 (18.36%)	John Keen; 47 (0.51%)			Doreen Hamilton

== Opinion polls ==
CBC Saskatchewan (October 20 – 26, 2003):

NDP – 42%
Saskatchewan Party – 39%
Liberals – 18%
Other – 1%

Cutler Poll (October 29–November 5, 2003):

NDP – 47%
Saskatchewan Party – 37%
Liberals – 14%
Other – 2%

== See also ==
- List of political parties in Saskatchewan
- List of Saskatchewan provincial electoral districts
