= Regina Sherwood =

Saskatchewan electoral district

Defunct provincial electoral district
- Legislature: Legislative Assembly of Saskatchewan
- District created: 1995
- First contested: 1995
- Last contested: 2003

Demographics
- Census division(s): Division 6
- Census subdivision(s): Regina

Regina Sherwood was a provincial electoral district for the Legislative Assembly of Saskatchewan, Canada. It consisted of the Regina neighbourhoods of Normanview West, and parts of Dieppe, Mount Royal, Normanview, Walsh Acres and McCarthy Park .

The riding was created prior to the 1995 election out of parts of Regina Rosemont, Regina North West and Regina Albert North. It was abolished prior to the 2003 election into Regina Walsh Acres, Regina Rosemont and Regina Qu'Appelle Valley.

== Members of the Legislative Assembly ==
Legislature	Years	Member	Party
Regina Sherwood
23rd	1995–1999	Lindy Kasperski	New Democrat
24th	1999–2001	Lindy Kasperski	New Democrat
24th	2001–2003	Lindy Kasperski	Independent

== Election results ==
=== Regina Sherwood (1995–2003) ===
1999 Saskatchewan general election: Regina Sherwood
Party	Candidate	Votes	%	±%
NDP	Lindy Kasperski	3,090	50.58	-12.69
Saskatchewan	Arlene Bray	1,549	25.36	*
Liberal	Tom Crosby	1,369	22.41	-7.09
Prog. Conservative	George Marcotte	101	1.65	-5.58
Total valid votes		6,109	99.45	
Total rejected ballots		34	0.55	+0.08
Turnout		6,143	61.71	+1.34
Eligible voters		9,955		
New Democratic hold		Swing		-19.02
Source: Elections Saskatchewan

1995 Saskatchewan general election
Party	Candidate	Votes	%
NDP	Lindy Kasperski	3,951	63.27
Liberal	Frank Gribbon	1,842	29.50
Prog. Conservative	Thomas D. Durbin	452	7.24
Total valid votes		6,245	99.52
Total rejected ballots		30	0.48
Turnout		6,275	60.37
Eligible voters		10,395	
Source: Elections Saskatchewan
