= Evan Carlson =

Canadian politician

MLA for Melville
- In office 1991–1995
- Preceded by: Grant Schmidt
- Succeeded by: Ron Osika

Personal details
- Born: June 28, 1953 (age 72) Melville, Saskatchewan
- Party: New Democratic Party

Evan Carlson (born June 28, 1953) is a Canadian politician, who represented the electoral district of Melville in the Legislative Assembly of Saskatchewan from 1991 to 1995.

== Background ==
Born and raised in Melville, Carlson worked as a farmer before entering politics, and served on the board of the Melville Credit Union.

== Politics ==
He was first elected in the 1991 provincial election, defeating incumbent Progressive Conservative MLA Grant Schmidt. However, he was defeated in the 1995 provincial election by Ron Osika of the Liberals.

He subsequently stood as the federal New Democratic Party candidate in Yorkton—Melville in the 1997 federal election, but lost to Reform Party incumbent Garry Breitkreuz.

== Career after politics ==
He was subsequently employed as a victim support worker with the Saskatoon Police Service from 1999 to 2003, and is currently a mental health worker with the Saskatoon Health Region. He is also on the board of an emergency housing shelter in Saskatoon.

== Electoral record ==
1997 Canadian federal election: Yorkton—Melville
Party	Candidate	Votes	%	±%	Expenditures
Reform	Garry Breitkreuz*	17,216	50.1	+17.4	$53,836
New Democratic	Evan Carlson	8,583	25.0	-4.4	$43,899
Liberal	Lloyd Sandercock	6,481	18.9	-10.6	$39,999
Progressive Conservative	Ivan Daunt	2,101	6.1	-2.6	$6,357
Total valid votes		34,381	100.0		–
Total rejected ballots		116	0.3		
Turnout		34,497	66.9	–	
Reform hold		Swing		+10.90	

1991 Saskatchewan general election: Melville
Party	Candidate	Votes	%	±%
NDP	Evan Carlson	3,656	45.90%	+7.31
Prog. Conservative	Grant Schmidt	3,048	38.26%	-15.20
Liberal	Ray Chastkavich	1,262	15.84%	+8.33
Total		7,966	100.00%	

1995 Saskatchewan general election: Melville
Party	Candidate	Votes	%	±%
Liberal	Ron Osika	3,274	41.89%	+26.05
NDP	Evan Carlson	2,975	38.07%	-7.83
Prog. Conservative	Doug Gattinger	1,566	20.04%	-18.22
Total		7,815	100.00%	

1997 Canadian federal election
Party	Candidate	Votes	%	±%	Expenditures
Reform	Garry Breitkreuz	17,216	50.07%	–	$53,836
New Democratic	Evan Carlson	8,583	24.96%	–	$43,899
Liberal	Lloyd Sandercock	6,481	18.85%	–	$39,999
Progressive Conservative	Ivan Daunt	2,101	6.11%	–	$6,357
Total valid votes		34,381	100.00%		
Total rejected ballots		116	0.34%		
Turnout		34,497	66.92%		
