= Saskatchewan Liberal Party leadership elections =

This page shows the results of leadership elections in the Saskatchewan Liberal Party (known as the Saskatchewan Progress Party, after 2023). All leadership contests were been determined by delegated conventions.

== Liberal leadership convention, 1905 ==
(Held on August 16, 1905.)

- Thomas Walter Scott acclaimed

(Note: this convention was held a few weeks before Saskatchewan was officially proclaimed as a Canadian province.)

== Developments, 1905-1926 ==
Walter Scott resigned as premier and party leader in 1916, and was replaced by William M. Martin on October 20 of that year. Martin was selected by the Liberal parliamentary caucus; it is assumed that he was subsequently confirmed without opposition at a provincial Liberal convention.

Martin, in turn, resigned in 1922, and was replaced by Charles A. Dunning on April 5 of that year. Dunning, like Martin, was chosen by caucus; it is also assumed that he was later confirmed without opposition by the party.

== Liberal leadership convention, 1926 ==
(Held on February 25, 1926.)

- GARDINER, James G. acclaimed

(Note: A.P. McNab, S.J. Latta and C.M. Hamilton were also nominated at the convention, but all three withdrew to make the choice of Gardiner unanimous.)

== Developments, 1926-1946 ==
Gardiner resigned as Premier and party leader in 1935 to enter the federal cabinet of W.L.M. King. On October 31, 1935, William John Patterson was the unanimous choice of the provincial Liberal council to take his before. It is assumed that Patterson was approved without opposition at a subsequent party convention.

== Liberal leadership convention, 1946 ==
(Held on August 6, 1946.)

- TUCKER, Walter 373
- E.M. Culliton 250

== Liberal leadership convention, 1954 ==
(Held on November 26, 1954.)

- Alexander H. McDonald 388
- L.B. Thomson 227
- Wilf Gardiner 78
- John Egnatoff 40
- W.J. Simmie 16

== Liberal leadership convention, 1959 ==
(Held on September 24, 1959.)

- Ross Thatcher
- Wilf Gardiner
- Frank Foley
- Alex Cameron

(Note: The vote totals were not released, although it is believed that Thatcher won with about 67% support on the first ballot.)

== Liberal leadership convention, 1971 ==
(Held on December 11, 1971.)

First ballot:

- David Steuart 404
- Cy MacDonald 295
- George Gordon Leith 171

Second ballot:

- David Steuart 535
- Cy MacDonald 314

== Liberal leadership convention, 1976 ==
(Held on December 11, 1976.)

- Edward Cyril Malone 628
- Anthony Merchant 521

== Liberal leadership convention, 1981 ==
(Held on June 13, 1981.)

- Ralph Goodale acclaimed

== Liberal leadership convention, 1989 ==
(Held on April 2, 1989.)

- Lynda Haverstock
- BLAU, June
- CURRIE, Neil

(Note: The results were not announced, but it is believed that Haverstock won by a significant majority on the first ballot.)

== Liberal leadership convention, 1996 ==
(Held on November 24, 1996.)

First ballot:

- Tom Hengen 350
- Jim Melenchuk 332
- Ken Krawetz 239
- Gerard Aldridge 55

Second ballot:

- Jim Melenchuk 383
- Tom Hengen 292
- Ken Krawetz 279

Third ballot:

- Jim Melenchuk 554
- Tom Hengen 367

== Liberal leadership convention, 2001 ==
(Held on October 27, 2001.)

- David Karwacki 430
- Jack Hillson 228

== Liberal leadership convention, 2009 ==
Ryan Bater' acclaimed

== Liberal leadership convention, 2018 ==
Naveed Anwar was acclaimed on May 5, 2018.
