= Rosetown-Delisle =

Provincial electoral district in Saskatchewan, Canada

Coordinates: 51°10′N 107°50′W

Saskatchewan electoral district

Provincial electoral district
- Legislature: Legislative Assembly of Saskatchewan
MLA
Jim Reiter
Saskatchewan
- District created: 2002
- First contested: 2003
- Last contested: 2020

Demographics
- Electors: 9,892
- Census division(s): Division 12, 8, 7
- Census subdivision: Rosetown

Rosetown-Delisle is a provincial electoral district for the Legislative Assembly of Saskatchewan, Canada. The largest community is Rosetown. Smaller communities in the district include the towns of Outlook, Elrose, Kyle, Zealandia, Langham and Eston; and the villages of Dinsmore, Harris, Beechy, Lucky Lake, and Conquest.

== History ==
This constituency was created for the 1975 election as Rosetown-Elrose from the districts of Rosetown and Elrose. The district was renamed Rosetown-Biggar before the 1995 general election, but the name was changed back to Rosetown-Elrose before the 2003 general election.

Prior to the 2024 general election, the district was significantly reconfigured, losing a large area west of Rosetown and Elrose to Kindersley-Biggar and Cypress Hills, while taking in Delisle and adjacent areas of exurban Saskatoon from Biggar-Sask Valley. Accordingly, the riding was renamed Rosetown-Delisle.

== Members of the Legislative Assembly ==
Legislature	Years	Member	Party
Rosetown-Elrose
18th	1975 – 1978	Roy Bailey	Progressive Conservative Party
19th	1978 – 1982	Herbert Swan	Progressive Conservative Party
20th	1982 – 1986	Herbert Swan	Progressive Conservative Party
21st	1986 – 1991	Herbert Swan	Progressive Conservative Party
22nd	1991 - 1995	Berny Wiens	New Democratic Party
Rosetown-Biggar
23rd	1995 - 1999	Berny Wiens	New Democratic Party
24th	1999 - 2003	Elwin Hermanson	Saskatchewan Party
Rosetown-Elrose
25th	2003 – 2007	Elwin Hermanson	Saskatchewan Party
26th	2007 – 2011	Jim Reiter	Saskatchewan Party
27th	2011 – 2016	Jim Reiter	Saskatchewan Party
28th	2016 – 2020	Jim Reiter	Saskatchewan Party
29th	2020 – 2024	Jim Reiter	Saskatchewan Party
Rosetown-Delisle
30th	2024 – present	Jim Reiter	Saskatchewan Party

== Election results ==
2024 Saskatchewan general election
Party	Candidate	Votes	%	±%
Saskatchewan	Jim Reiter	5,965	70.74	-6.96
New Democratic	Brenda Edel	2,235	26.51	+10.57
Green	Sean Muirhead	232	2.75	+0.17
Total valid votes		8,432	99.40	
Total rejected ballots		51	0.60	
Turnout		8,483	63.58	
Eligible voters		13,343		
Saskatchewan hold		Swing		
Source: Elections Saskatchewan

2020 Saskatchewan general election: Rosetown-Elrose
Party	Candidate	Votes	%	±%
Saskatchewan	Jim Reiter	5,806	77.70	+0.04
New Democratic	Brenda Edel	1,191	15.94	-2.10
Progressive Conservative	Adrian Janssens	282	3.78	+1.88
Green	Justina Robinson	193	2.58	+0.20
Total valid votes		7,472	99.15	
Total rejected ballots		64	0.85	–
Turnout		7,536	–	–
Eligible voters		–		
Saskatchewan hold		Swing		–
Source: Elections Saskatchewan

2016 Saskatchewan general election: Rosetown-Elrose
Party	Candidate	Votes	%	±%
Saskatchewan	Jim Reiter	5,939	77.66	-3.54
New Democratic	Glenn Wright	1,380	18.04	+2.04
Green	Yvonne Potter Pihach	182	2.38	-0.42
Liberal	Adrian Janssens	146	1.90	-
Total valid votes		7,647	100.0	
Eligible voters		–		
Source: Elections Saskatchewan

2011 Saskatchewan general election: Rosetown-Elrose
Party	Candidate	Votes	%	±%
Saskatchewan	Jim Reiter	5,690	81.20	+10.02
NDP	Tom Howe	1,121	16.00	-3.99
Green	Dianne Rhodes	196	2.80	+0.06
Total		7,007	100.00	

2007 Saskatchewan general election: Rosetown-Elrose
Party	Candidate	Votes	%	±%
Saskatchewan	Jim Reiter	5,669	71.18	+7.56
NDP	Eric Anderson	1,592	19.99	-7.07
Liberal	Tracey Kowalchuk	485	6.09	-3.23
Green	Kirk Friggstad	218	2.74	–
Total		7,964	100.00%	

2003 Saskatchewan general election: Rosetown-Elrose
Party	Candidate	Votes	%	±%
Saskatchewan	Elwin Hermanson	5,173	63.62	–
NDP	Jack Randall Mason	2,200	27.06	–
Liberal	Janay Volk	758	9.32	–
Total		8,131	100.00	

== See also ==
- List of Saskatchewan provincial electoral districts
- List of Saskatchewan general elections
- Canadian provincial electoral districts
