= SPUDCO =

Saskatchewan Potato Utility Development Company
- Founded: 1996; 29 years ago
- Founders: SaskWater; Lake Diefenbaker Potato Corporation
- Defunct: 2000

The Saskatchewan Potato Utility Development Company (SPUDCO) was a public–private partnership between SaskWater and Lake Diefenbaker Potato Corporation (LDPC). It was created in 1996 and had signs of trouble from the start. The fallout from the numerous scandals led to the bankruptcy of LDPC and subsequent lawsuit which was settled for $7.9 million CAD and a Royal Canadian Mounted Police (RCMP) investigation. SPUDCO folded in 2000.

== See also ==
- 2003 Saskatchewan general election
- Saskatchewan New Democratic Party
