= Ron Osika =

Canadian politician

The Honourable Ronald Osika ECS

22nd Speaker of the Legislative Assembly of Saskatchewan
- In office December 6, 1999 – February 7, 2001
- Preceded by: Glenn Hagel
- Succeeded by: Myron Kowalsky

Leader of the Opposition (Saskatchewan)
- In office November 12, 1995 – November 24, 1996
- Preceded by: Lynda Haverstock
- Succeeded by: Ken Krawetz

Member of the Legislative Assembly of Saskatchewan for Melville
- In office June 21, 1995 – November 5, 2003
- Preceded by: Evan Carlson
- Succeeded by: riding merged into Melville-Saltcoats

Personal details
- Born: February 27, 1939 (age 87) Hafford, Saskatchewan
- Party: Liberal (1995-2001); NDP (since 2003)

Ronald (Ron) Osika (born February 27, 1939) is a former Canadian politician, who served in the Legislative Assembly of Saskatchewan from 1995 to 2003.

The son of Polish immigrants, he was born on a homestead near Hafford, Saskatchewan, and educated in The Battlefords. A former officer in the Royal Canadian Mounted Police, Osika's first foray into politics was an unsuccessful bid for a Reform Party nomination in 1992.

He was first elected from Melville as Liberal MLA in the Saskatchewan legislature in the 1995 provincial election that saw the Liberals go from a single seat to 11 to form the official opposition. Osika served as interim Leader of the Opposition in November 1995 after Lynda Haverstock was forced to resign as leader by her caucus. He remained leader until November 1996 when Jim Melenchuk was chosen as Haverstock's permanent replacement. The 1999 provincial election reduced Roy Romanow's NDP to a minority government while also reducing the Liberals to third party status with four MLAs. The Liberals agreed to enter into a coalition government and Osika became Speaker of the Legislative Assembly of Saskatchewan from 1999 until February 2001 when he joined Calvert's Cabinet as Municipal Affairs minister. In October 2001, the Liberal Party elected David Karwacki as its new leader. He ordered the Liberal MLAs to leave the coalition government but Osika and Melenchuk refused and became Independents signing a new coalition agreement with Calvert in late 2001. In early 2002, Osika became Government Relations Minister and at various times had additional responsibilities for aboriginal affairs, SaskWater, the Saskatchewan Liquor and Gaming Authority and the Saskatchewan Property Management Corporation. He ran for re-election as an NDP candidate in the 2003 provincial election but was defeated in the riding of Melville-Saltcoats.

Osika turned to municipal politics after his defeat and was mayor of Fort Qu'Appelle from 2005 to 2016 when he chose not to seek another term.
