= Elwin Hermanson =

Canadian politician

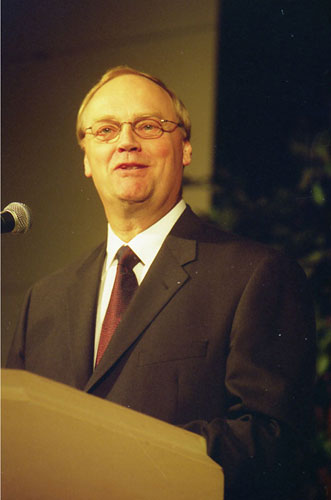
- Elwin Hermanson

Member of Parliament for Kindersley—Lloydminster
- In office 1993–1997
- Preceded by: Bill McKnight
- Succeeded by: Riding dissolved

Leader of the Opposition (Saskatchewan)
- In office April 13, 1999 – July 15, 2004
- Preceded by: Ken Krawetz
- Succeeded by: Brad Wall

Leader of the Saskatchewan Party
- In office April 20, 1998 – July 15, 2004
- Preceded by: Ken Krawetz (Interim)
- Succeeded by: Brad Wall

MLA for Rosetown–Biggar/Rosetown–Elrose
- In office September 16, 1999 – September 27, 2007
- Preceded by: Berny Wiens
- Succeeded by: Jim Reiter

Personal details
- Born: August 22, 1952 (age 73) Swift Current, Saskatchewan
- Party: Reform Party; Saskatchewan Party

Elwin Norris Hermanson (born August 22, 1952) is a former Canadian politician from Swift Current, Saskatchewan. He served as a member of Parliament (MP) for Kindersley—Lloydminster from 1993 to 1997 as a member of the Reform Party, and as a Member of the Legislative Assembly of Saskatchewan for Rosetown-Elrose from 1999 to 2007 as a member of the Saskatchewan Party. Hermanson was the first permanent leader of the Saskatchewan Party and was leader of the Opposition from 1999 to 2004.

== Political career ==
=== Federal politics ===
Hermanson first ran for political office in the 1988 Canadian federal election as a member of the fledgling Reform Party, a western protest party with a platform mixing western alienation with social conservatism. The party failed to have any members elected. However, Reform surged to third-party status in the 1993 election, and Hermanson was one of four Reform MPs elected in Saskatchewan. He was the Reform Party House Leader from 1993 to 1995. Following a redistribution he ran in the 1997 election in the new riding of Saskatoon—Rosetown—Biggar; while the Reform Party continued to attract voters, becoming the Official Opposition, Hermanson lost his seat to fellow incumbent Chris Axworthy of the New Democratic Party.

=== Saskatchewan Party ===
Following his federal election loss in 1997, Hermanson turned his attention to provincial politics. That year also saw the foundation of the Saskatchewan Party as a new conservative party in the province, bringing together former Progressive Conservatives, some Liberal members, and Reform Party organizers. Hermanson sought the leadership of the new party in 1998, facing off against Rod Gantefoer, a former Liberal member of the Legislative Assembly of Saskatchewan (MLA), and political newcomer Yogi Huyghebaert. On April 20, 1998, Hermanson was elected the first Saskatchewan Party leader in a one member, one vote election. Aware that the conservative base in the province was in rural areas, Hermanson stated that people "know I have the best interests of the agriculture industry and rural Saskatchewan at heart because that's where I still live". Hermanson did not have a seat in the legislature, and he declined to run in a 1998 Saskatoon by-election, instead waiting for the next general election to run for a seat. This left Ken Krawetz to serve as the interim House Opposition leader.

Under Hermanson, the Saskatchewan Party campaigned on an ambitious fiscal conservative platform, calling for major corporate and income tax cuts, along with a number of controversial and social conservative policies, from a commitment to consider privatizing crown corporations to work-for-welfare policies and an end to public affirmative action.

Hermanson was elected in the 1999 provincial election for Rosetown–Biggar and, leading the Saskatchewan Party to a strong performance, became Leader of the Opposition. The new party shocked the province in winning a small plurality of the popular vote, but it was completely shut out in the urban centres of Regina and Saskatoon. Ultimately, this left the Saskatchewan Party with 25 seats. However, the result reduced the Saskatchewan New Democratic Party (NDP) to a minority government with 29 seats, forcing Premier Roy Romanow to form a coalition government with the remaining Liberals.

After this strong performance, Hermanson was widely expected to lead the party to victory in the next election, and the party led polling heading into 2003. The party again campaigned on a platform of tax reductions and decreased government involvement in the economy, but it remained bogged down by questions about its conservatism and its plans for crown corporations. Hermanson continued to state that he would be willing to entertain offers for the province's crown corporations and the NDP, now led by Lorne Calvert, made this a focal point of their campaign. At one point in the campaign, Hermanson criticized the NDP for a leaked internal cartoon that depicted him as a Nazi loading NDP sympathizers onto rail cars. Ultimately, the 2003 election would prove a major disappointment for the Saskatchewan Party as the NDP won a bare majority. While Hermanson's party made a net gain of two seats, both in Saskatoon, it was shut out of Regina once again. Hermanson resigned days after the election. However, he committed to remaining the MLA for Rosetown–Elrose. In March 2004, Hermanson was succeeded by Brad Wall when he was acclaimed the new Saskatchewan Party leader.

On June 23, 2006, Hermanson announced that he would not be seeking re-election to the legislature, marking the end of his run in provincial politics. Wall would lead the Saskatchewan Party to a majority government in the 2007 election, while party member Jim Reiter succeeded Hermanson as Rosetown–Elrose MLA.

== After politics ==
In 2007, Hermanson was appointed by the federal government to lead the Canadian Grain Commission for a five-year term beginning in January 2008.

In 2017, during the leadership race to replace Brad Wall as Saskatchewan Party leader, Hermanson was criticized for commenting on and sharing an Islamophobic article on Twitter. Leadership candidate Alanna Koch, whom Hermanson had endorsed, was among those vocally critical in response.

== Electoral record ==
=== Provincial ===
2003 Saskatchewan general election: Rosetown—Elrose
Party	Candidate	Votes	%
Saskatchewan	Elwin Hermanson	5,173	63.62
New Democratic	Jack Mason	2,200	27.06
Liberal	Janay Volk	758	9.32
Total valid votes		8,131	100.00

1999 Saskatchewan general election: Rosetown—Biggar
Party	Candidate	Votes	%
Saskatchewan	Elwin Hermanson	4,907	58.90
New Democratic	Bernhard Wiens	2,801	33.62
Liberal	John Hendrickson	548	6.58
New Green	Rick Barsky	75	0.90
Total valid votes		8,331	100.00

=== Federal ===
1997 Canadian federal election: Saskatoon—Rosetown—Biggar
Party	Candidate	Votes	%
New Democratic	Chris Axworthy	12,095	43.72
Reform	Elwin Hermanson	9,011	32.57
Liberal	Tanyss Munro	4,438	16.04
Progressive Conservative	Richard Gabruch	1,931	6.98
Canadian Action	Rick Barsky	191	0.69
Total valid votes		27,666	100.00

1993 Canadian federal election: Kindersley—Lloydminster
Party	Candidate	Votes	%
Reform	Elwin Hermanson	12,292	40.52
Liberal	Judy Setrakov	8,423	27.77
New Democratic	Elizabeth Thomas	4,961	16.35
Progressive Conservative	Jack Sandberg	4,134	13.63
National	Rick Barsky	392	1.29
Canada Party	Emanuel Fahlman	134	0.44
Total valid votes		30,336	100.00

1988 Canadian federal election: Kindersley—Lloydminster
Party	Candidate	Votes	%
Progressive Conservative	Bill McKnight	15,089	44.98
New Democratic	Grant Whitmore	11,198	33.38
Liberal	Bev Kaufman	5,039	15.02
Reform	Elwin Hermanson	2,217	6.61
Total valid votes		33,543	99.99
