= Jack Goohsen =

Canadian politician

Jack Goohsen (born November 7, 1942) is a farmer and former political figure in Saskatchewan, Canada.

Goohsen was born in Gull Lake, Saskatchewan and studied agricultural management at the University of Saskatchewan. He established a farm in the Gull Lake area. He served on the council for the rural municipality of Carmichael, serving as reeve from 1981 to 1992, and was elected to represent Maple Creek in the 1991 Saskatchewan general election and again in the new Cypress Hills district in the 1995 Saskatchewan general election to the Legislative Assembly of Saskatchewan as a Progressive Conservative.

In the spring of 1997, Goohsen was criminally charged after he was accused of trying to buy sex from a 14-year-old girl. As a result of this scandal, he was not invited to join the caucus of the newly founded Saskatchewan Party when it was formed by the remaining Progressive Conservative members along with some Saskatchewan Liberal Party MLA's that summer. Goohsen remained in the legislature as an independent member while his case made its way through the courts. Gooshen resigned as an MLA after being convicted in 1999 on the child prostitution charge. He lost his appeal to the SK Court of Appeal.
