= Grant Whitmore =

Canadian politician

Member of the Legislative Assembly of Saskatchewan
- In office 1991–1995
- Preceded by: Harry Baker
- Succeeded by: riding dissolved
- Constituency: Biggar
- In office 1995–1999
- Preceded by: first member
- Succeeded by: Jim Melenchuk
- Constituency: Saskatoon Northwest

Personal details
- Born: 1956 (age 69–70)
- Party: New Democrat
- Occupation: farmer

Grant Whitmore (1956 –) is a former Canadian politician, who sat in the Legislative Assembly of Saskatchewan from 1991 to 1999. A member of the Saskatchewan New Democratic Party caucus, he represented the electoral districts of Biggar from 1991 to 1995, and Saskatoon Northwest from 1995 to 1999.

Prior to his election to the legislature, he was a farmer and a delegate to the Saskatchewan Wheat Pool.
