= Ken Krawetz =

Canadian politician (1951–2026))

The Honourable Ken Krawetz ECS

Member of the Saskatchewan Legislative Assembly for Canora-Pelly
- In office June 21, 1995 – April 4, 2016
- Preceded by: Riding Established
- Succeeded by: Terry Dennis

Minister of Finance
- In office June 29, 2009 – May 21, 2015
- Preceded by: Rod Gantefoer
- Succeeded by: Kevin Doherty

Leader of the Opposition (Saskatchewan)
- In office 1996–1999
- Preceded by: Ron Osika
- Succeeded by: Elwin Hermanson

Interim Leader of the Saskatchewan Party
- In office August 11, 1997 – April 20, 1998
- Preceded by: Position established
- Succeeded by: Elwin Hermanson

Personal details
- Born: April 15, 1951 Canora, Saskatchewan, Canada
- Died: October 1, 2026 (aged 75)
- Party: Saskatchewan Party
- Other political affiliations: Liberal (1995–1997)
- Spouse: Gail Krawetz

Kenneth Patrick Krawetz (April 15, 1951 – October 1, 2026) was a Canadian provincial politician. He was the Saskatchewan Party member of the Legislative Assembly of Saskatchewan for the constituency of Canora-Pelly, and was Deputy Premier of Saskatchewan and Deputy Leader of the Saskatchewan Party.

== Career ==
Krawetz was first elected to the Saskatchewan legislature in the 1995 provincial election as a Liberal. He became the Leader of the Opposition in 1996 when Jim Melenchuk was chosen Liberal Party leader as Melenchuk did not have a seat in the legislature. In 1997, Krawetz joined three other Liberal MLAs and four Progressive Conservative MLAs in leaving their respective parties in order to form the new Saskatchewan Party. Krawetz remained as Leader of the Opposition while serving as the interim leader of the Saskatchewan Party, until the election of Elwin Hermanson to the legislature in the 1999 election.

When Brad Wall became leader of the party in 2004, he named Krawetz as Deputy Leader. Following the 2007 provincial election that saw the Saskatchewan Party take power for the first time, Wall appointed Krawetz to the cabinet as Deputy Premier and Minister of Education. In a cabinet shuffle on June 29, 2010, Wall moved Krawetz to the Finance Ministry, while Krawetz retained his post as Deputy Premier.

On April 28, 2014, Krawetz announced that he would not seek a new term in the 2016 election. Krawetz was shuffled out of the cabinet on May 21, 2015, but was given a role as Legislative Secretary on Saskatchewan-Ukraine relations.

== Personal life and death ==
Krawetz married Gail Maleschuk in 1972, and had two children. He died at the age of 75 on October 1, 2026.

== Awards ==
In January 2009, Krawetz was presented with the Order of Prince Yaroslav the Wise – the highest honour a non-citizen of Ukraine can receive – by Ukraine's president, Viktor Yushchenko, in recognition of Krawetz's efforts in ensuring the passage of the Ukrainian Famine and Genocide (Holodomor Memorial Day) Act (Bill 40) through the Saskatchewan legislature; and in promoting awareness throughout the province of the Holodomor's 75th anniversary during 2007 and 2008.
