= Saskatchewan Party leadership elections =

This page shows the results of leadership elections in the Saskatchewan Party. The elections are by One member, one vote.

== 1998 leadership convention ==
(Held on April 20, 1998)

Candidate	First ballot	Second ballot
Elwin Hermanson	1664 (49.7%)	1836 (54.9%)
Rod Gantefoer	1226 (36.7%)	1508 (45.1%)
Yogi Huyghebaert	454 (13.6%)	—

== 2004 leadership convention ==
(Held on July 15, 2004)

- Brad Wall acclaimed

== 2018 leadership election ==
(Held on January 27, 2018)

= Eliminated from next round
= Winner

Candidate	Ballot 1	Ballot 2		Ballot 3		Ballot 4		Ballot 5	
Name	Votes	Votes	+/- (pp)	Votes	+/- (pp)	Votes	+/- (pp)	Votes	+/- (pp)
Alanna Koch	4,529; 26.39%	4,533; 26.42%	+4 +0.03%	4,598; 26.82%	+65 +0.4%	5,591; 34.06%	+993 +7.24%	6,914; 46.13%	+1,323 +12.07%
Scott Moe	4,483; 26.13%	4,495; 26.20%	+12 +0.07%	4,544; 26.51%	+49 +0.31%	5,980; 36.46%	+1,436 +9.95%	8,075; 53.87%	+2,095 +17.44%
Ken Cheveldayoff	4,177; 24.34%	4,202; 24.49%	+25 +0.15%	4,221; 24.62%	+19 +0.13%	4,844; 29.51%	+623 +4.89%	eliminated	
Gordon Wyant	3,696; 21.54%	3,698; 21.56%	+2 +0.02%	3,780; 22.05%	+82 +0.49%	eliminated			
Tina Beaudry-Mellor	226; 1.32%	228; 1.33%	+2 +0.02%	eliminated					
Rob Clarke	48; 0.28%	withdrew before balloting, endorsed Cheveldayoff							

== See also ==
- Leadership convention
- Saskatchewan Party
