= David Karwacki =

Canadian politician

Leader of the Saskatchewan Liberal Party
- In office 27 October 2001 – 21 December 2007
- Preceded by: Jim Melenchuk
- Succeeded by: Frank Proto (interim)

Personal details
- Born: 30 May 1965 (age 60) Saskatoon, Saskatchewan, Canada
- Party: Liberal
- Occupation: Politician

David Karwacki (born 30 May 1965) is a Canadian politician and businessman, serving as the Leader of the Saskatchewan Liberals between October 2001 and December 2007. Under his tenure as Liberal leader, the party lost parliamentary representation in the Legislative Assembly of Saskatchewan.

== Biography ==
Born in Saskatoon, Saskatchewan, Canada, Karwacki attended the University of Saskatchewan, graduating from the College of Commerce in 1989. He also has engaged in continuing business education at M.I.T. in Boston and more recently at Stanford in San Francisco. In 1989, he founded the Star Group, a food distributor company, with Gary Budd.

In October 2001, Karwacki became the leader of the Saskatchewan Liberals, defeating Liberal MLA Jack Hillson. Karwacki ran on a platform of disbanding the Liberal coalition with the Saskatchewan NDP. Karwacki ran in the constituency of Saskatoon Meewasin in the 2003 provincial election, finishing second to former Justice Minister Frank Quennell. The Liberals also lost their last remaining seat in the provincial legislature. He ran in the 2006 Weyburn-Big Muddy by-election, held on 19 June, placing second with 27% of the vote. Saskatchewan Party candidate Dustin Duncan won with 49% of the vote.

In December 2006, Karwacki addressed the Liberal leadership convention in Montreal on the topic of Liberalism in Western Canada.

Karwacki ran in the Saskatoon Meewasin constituency in the 2007 Saskatchewan general election, placing third and receiving a lower percentage than in the 2003 general election. Karwacki then quit as the leader of the Liberals in December 2007.

Karwacki returned being a businessman, and retired as the CEO of Star Group in 2024.
