= Walter Jess =

Canadian politician

MLA for Redberry
- In office 1991–1999

Personal details
- Born: April 13, 1942 (age 84)
- Party: Saskatchewan New Democratic Party

Walter Jess (born April 13, 1942) was a Canadian politician who served in the Legislative Assembly of Saskatchewan from 1991 to 1999, as a NDP member for the constituency of Redberry.
