= Jim Melenchuk =

Canadian politician

The Honourable Jim Melenchuk ECS

MLA for Saskatoon Northwest
- In office 1999–2003
- Preceded by: Grant Whitmore
- Succeeded by: Ted Merriman

Personal details
- Born: June 24, 1953 (age 72) Regina, Saskatchewan, Canada
- Party: Liberal → Independent → NDP
- Occupation: physician

James Williams Melenchuk (born June 24, 1953) is a former Canadian politician. He represented the electoral district of Saskatoon Northwest in the Legislative Assembly of Saskatchewan from 1999 to 2003.

He was educated at the University of Regina and the University of Saskatchewan and practised medicine in Saskatoon.

Melenchuk became the leader of the Saskatchewan Liberal Party in 1996 following the resignation of Lynda Haverstock.In August 1997, 4 Liberal MLAs left to found a new political party, the Saskatchewan Party, causing the Liberals to lose their Official Opposition status. Melenchuk was elected to the Legislature in the 1999 election. With the governing New Democrats in a minority government situation, the party entered a coalition agreement and all three Liberal MLAs — Melenchuk, Ron Osika and Jack Hillson — were appointed to the provincial cabinet. Melenchuk served as Minister of Education. The coalition was controversial among party members, however, and Hillson subsequently left to sit as an independent.

Melenchuk stepped down as Liberal leader in 2001 and was succeeded by David Karwacki.

Karwacki ordered Melenchuk and Osika to disband the coalition — however, both refused and officially left the Liberal caucus. They sat as independent MLAs until 2003 when they both ran for re-election as NDP candidates in the 2003 election. Both were, however, defeated by members of the Saskatchewan Party.

In 2005, Melenchuk was named academic health sciences liaison between the Saskatchewan government and the University of Saskatchewan.
