= North Battleford (provincial electoral district) =

Former provincial electoral district in Saskatchewan, Canada

North Battleford was a constituency of the Legislative Assembly of Saskatchewan.

== Boundaries ==
The riding was based around the city of North Battleford.

== History ==
The constituency was in use (1908–1917).

North Battleford was merged with Battleford into The Battlefords.

== Representation ==
Member	Party	Years
Douglas Anguish	NDP	1986 – 1996
Jack Hillson	Liberal	1996 – 2003
Became The Battlefords

== See also ==
- List of Saskatchewan provincial electoral districts
- List of Saskatchewan general elections
- Canadian provincial electoral districts
