= Berny Wiens =

Canadian politician

Bernhard Henry "Berny" Wiens (born September 2, 1945) is a former political figure in Saskatchewan, Canada. He represented Rosetown-Elrose from 1991 to 1995 and Rosetown-Biggar from 1995 to 1999 in the Legislative Assembly of Saskatchewan as a New Democratic Party (NDP) member.

He was born in Rosetown, Saskatchewan, the son of Jacob Bernhard Wiens, and grew up on the family farm in Herschel. Wiens was educated in Herschel, in Rosthern and at the University of Saskatchewan. In 1968, he married Cheralyn Winona Marie Krug. Wiens taught science for one year and began operating a farm near Herschel around the same time. He also served as president of the Saskatchewan School Trustees Association and of the Canadian School Board Association. Wiens served in the provincial cabinet as Minister of Agriculture and Food, as Minister of Highways and Transportation, as Minister of the Environment and Public Safety, as Minister of the Environment and Resource Management, as Minister of Intergovernmental and Aboriginal Affairs and as Provincial Secretary. He was defeated by Elwin Hermanson when he ran for reelection to the assembly in 1999.

As of 2010, he was living near Herschel.
