= Lindy Kasperski =

Canadian politician

MLA for Regina Sherwood
- In office 1995–2003

Personal details
- Born: October 29, 1950 Regina, Saskatchewan
- Died: April 18, 2014 (aged 63) Regina, Saskatchewan
- Party: New Democratic Party → Independent

Lindy Marian Kasperski (October 29, 1950 – April 18, 2014) was a Canadian politician, who represented the constituency of Regina Sherwood in the Legislative Assembly of Saskatchewan from 1995 to 2003.

== History ==
First elected in the 1995 election, Kasperski was a member of the Saskatchewan New Democratic Party caucus until 2001, when he was suspended from the caucus after being charged with criminal fraud. He was cleared of the charges in June 2003 and invited to rejoin the NDP caucus, but as he was facing a difficult nomination contest against four challengers in the redistricted constituency of Regina Walsh Acres, he opted not to rejoin the party. He ran as an independent candidate in the 2003 election, but lost to Sandra Morin.

He ran Kontakt Consulting, a media and communications consulting firm in Regina. He died suddenly on April 18, 2014.
