= Shellbrook-Spiritwood =

Former provincial electoral district in Saskatchewan, Canada

Shellbrook-Spiritwood was a constituency of the Legislative Assembly of Saskatchewan.

== History ==
The riding was created out of Shellbrook.

== Geography ==
Spiritwood was in the constituency.

== Representation ==
Name	Term	Party
Lloyd Emmett Johnson	(1995–1999)	Saskatchewan New Democratic Party
Denis Allchurch	(1999–2003)	Saskatchewan Party

== See also ==
- List of Saskatchewan provincial electoral districts
- List of Saskatchewan general elections
- Canadian provincial electoral districts
