= Clay Serby =

Canadian politician

The Honourable Clay Serby ECS

Member of the Saskatchewan Legislative Assembly for Yorkton
- In office October 21, 1991 – November 7, 2007
- Preceded by: Lorne McLaren
- Succeeded by: Greg Ottenbreit

Personal details
- Born: February 15, 1950 (age 76) Theodore, Saskatchewan, Canada
- Party: New Democrat

Clay Serby is a former Canadian politician in Saskatchewan. He served as the province's deputy premier and Minister of Regional Economic and Co-operative Development. On September 7, 2007, he announced that he would not be running in the 2007 provincial election.
