= Jack Hillson =

Canadian politician (born 1945)

Member of the Saskatchewan Legislative Assembly for North Battleford
- In office 1996–2003

Candidate for leader of the Saskatchewan Liberal Party
- In office 2001

Personal details
- Born: Jack Hillson; 1945

Jack Hillson (born 1945) is a former Canadian provincial politician. He was the Liberal member of the Legislative Assembly of Saskatchewan for the constituency of North Battleford from 1996 to 2003.
