= Saskatchewan Liberal Party =

Provincial political party in Canada

- Founded: 1905
- Dissolved: 2026
- Succeeded by: Saskatchewan Progress Party (2023–2026)
- Headquarters: PO Box 825 Regina, SK S4P 3B1
- Ideology: Liberalism
- Political position: Centre
- National affiliation: Liberal Party of Canada (until 2009)
- Colours: Red

The Saskatchewan Liberal Party was a liberal political party in the Canadian province of Saskatchewan. It was founded in 1905. Until 2009, the party was affiliated with the Liberal Party of Canada. In 2023, the party re-branded as the Saskatchewan Progress Party.

The Liberals were a dominant force in Saskatchewan politics during the first half of the twentieth century, forming government for all but five years between 1905 and 1944. With the emergence of the Co-operative Commonwealth Federation (CCF) under Tommy Douglas' leadership, the Liberals spent the following two decades in Opposition before forming two more majority governments from 1964 to 1971. However, the party lost influence in the latter stages of the twentieth century. Although it reached Opposition status again in the mid-1990s, even that term was disrupted when much of the caucus abandoned the party to form the new Saskatchewan Party in 1997. The 1999 election marked the last time any Liberals were elected to the Legislature. After seeing its vote share decline precipitously in the twenty first century, the party was ultimately de-registered in 2026.

== History ==
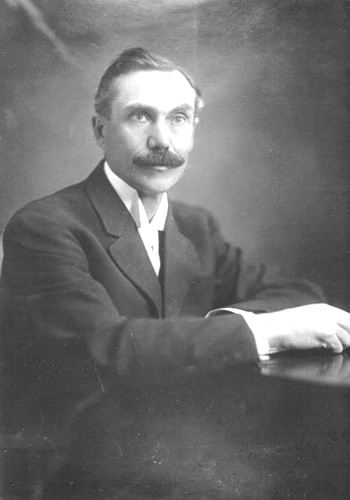
Liberal leader Walter Scott was Saskatchewan's first Premier, holding the role from 1905 to 1916.

=== Early history (1905–1944) ===
==== Political dominance (1905–1929) ====
The Liberal Party dominated Saskatchewan politics from the province's earliest days. Saskatchewan entered Confederation in September 1905 alongside neighbouring Alberta. Both provinces were carved out of the Northwest Territories; territorial premier Frederick Haultain had advocated for the creation of one large western province called Buffalo, but Wilfrid Laurier's federal Liberal government opted to create two provinces instead, wary of the potential strength of a province the size of Buffalo. Haultain responded by seeking the premiership of Saskatchewan under the banner of his Provincial Rights Party, but Saskatchewan voters opted in 1905 for the provincial Liberal Party under the leadership of Walter Scott. This marked the beginning of a long Liberal dynasty in the new Prairie province—the party provided six of the province's first seven premiers.

With the Liberals a strong force at the federal level, Saskatchewan voters appear to have preferred a provincial government that had influence at the national level, and there was crossover with Liberal premiers like Charles Dunning and Jimmy Gardiner moving on to key federal cabinet positions. As a consequence, the provincial Liberals presided over the province at a time of tremendous growth as a rapidly expanding population driven by immigration—the province became the third most populous in the country after Ontario and Quebec—established a large agricultural economy.

One of the keys to Liberal success was their close relationship with immigrant communities and especially with the largest farmers' lobby in the province, the Saskatchewan Grain Growers' Association. While United Farmer governments took power in both Alberta and Manitoba during the 1920s, and while the agrarian Progressive Party performed well in Saskatchewan at the federal level, the direct entry of farmers into provincial politics was fended off for longer in Saskatchewan by Liberal leadership attuned to farmers' organizations. Early Liberal premiers were even known to invite key agrarian organizers to the cabinet table.

The Liberals also stood against a rising tide of nativist sentiment in the province in the 1920s. While the Ku Klux Klan gained a foothold in the province—the organization had 25,000 members in Saskatchewan by 1929—and fomented discriminatory attitudes towards French, Catholic, and Eastern European settlers, Premier Gardiner defended his government's immigration policies and called the Klan both a foreign entity and a tool of the provincial Conservative Party. The Conservatives were reported to have aided Klan organization by supplying it with membership lists, and the party itself developed a nativist platform in the late 1920s, promising to protect British, Anglo-Saxon values. The Liberals were also heavily criticized for years of blatant patronage, which helped to move farmers closer to greater political participation and, more immediately, solidified a strong anti-Liberal bloc in the province. In the 1929 election, although the Liberals managed to win the most seats with 28, they fell short of a majority for the first time. They proved unable to gain the confidence of the Legislature, resulting in a coalition government under Conservative premier James T.M. Anderson—his party won 24 seats, and gained the support of the handful of Progressive and Independent members to form a coalition that they termed the "Co-operative" government.

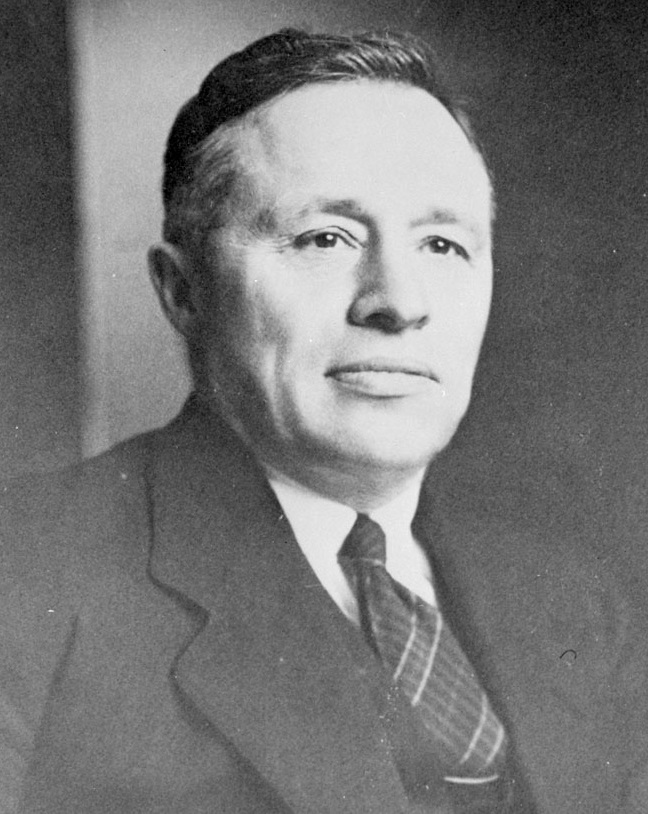
Jimmy Gardiner served two stints as Premier.

==== Opposition and return to power (1929–1944) ====
Anderson's government took power at the outset of the Great Depression, which proved to be especially severe for the Prairie provinces and which provided the Liberals with ample opportunity to criticize the government's inability to contend with the crisis. In 1932, Anderson even invited Gardiner's Liberals into his coalition, but Gardiner refused. At the same time, a new political party was gaining momentum in the province. In 1932, farmers with United Farmers of Canada voted to formally enter politics, and after a merger with the Independent Labour Party did so under the banner of Farmer-Labour; the new party became a founding member of the Co-operative Commonwealth Federation (CCF) that same year. The party was explicitly socialist, rapidly changing the dynamics of provincial politics.

Gardiner and the Liberals were able to return to power in 1934; the Conservatives failed to return a single member, and Farmer-Labour became the Official Opposition with five members to the Liberals' fifty. After the election, Farmer-Labour officially adopted the CCF party name. Almost immediately, Gardiner had to contend with the passage through Saskatchewan of the On-to-Ottawa Trek, a 1935 convoy meant to take the concerns of unemployed workers directly to the federal government. Prime Minister R.B. Bennett declared that the trekkers would not proceed past Regina, which acted as the headquarters to the Royal Canadian Mounted Police. Gardiner protested, predicting a riot. He was proven correct on July 1 1935, when the Regina Riot led to two deaths and hundreds of injuries.

The Liberals held on to their majority in the 1938 election, but they lost twelve seats as the Depression continued and the CCF gained further momentum. Although the Second World War began to relieve Depression conditions, by 1944 the CCF, under new leader Tommy Douglas, appeared poised to take power.

=== Varying fortunes (1944–1978) ===
==== Opposition to the CCF (1944–1964) ====
In the 1944 election, Saskatchewan elected the first democratic socialist government in North America under Douglas' CCF. The Liberals were soundly beaten, dropping to only five seats. CCF organizing had effectively captured the Liberals' traditional base, with farmers and immigrant settlers largely moving to the new party. The CCF's 1944 win marked the beginning of twenty years in government over five successive majorities. In Opposition, the Liberals became a vehemently anti-socialist party, persistently railing against the CCF government's interventions in the economy and presenting themselves as a free-market alternative. The Liberals staked the 1948 election on the slogan "Tucker or tyranny", referencing leader Walter Tucker. The CCF was re-elected to a reduced majority. In 1957, future party leader Ross Thatcher famously held a televised debate against Douglas in Mossbank on the topic of the province's crown corporations. Accounts tended to label the debate a draw, which was considered an achievement against the formidable Douglas. All the while, the CCF focused intently on building a modern welfare state.

The biggest battle between the two parties occurred over the introduction of universal health care in the early 1960s. The CCF effectively pitched the 1960 election as a referendum on the issue, and were re-elected to their fifth majority. However, the Liberals under Thatcher came firmly to the support of the province's organized medical profession, which was adamantly opposed to the scheme. Douglas resigned his post in the middle of this battle in 1961 to take on the leadership of the federal New Democratic Party (NDP), and a 1962 doctors' strike threatened to put an end to the plan. However, the strike was resolved and medicare was introduced in 1962, soon to be expanded nationwide.

==== Thatcher government (1964–1971) ====
With the province divided over the bitter medicare debate, Thatcher was able to lead the Liberals back to a majority government in the 1964 election, although the popular vote was a virtual tie. Thatcher—who had begun his own career as a member of the CCF—promised to open Saskatchewan for business and to dramatically scale back the government's involvement in the economy. His biggest success came in the potash sector; while the industry got off the ground under the CCF, it expanded rapidly in the latter half of the 1960s, so much so that Thatcher ultimately negotiated a minimum price and production cap with American producers. Although Thatcher had opposed the implementation of medicare, his government proved unable to reverse it with the program being rolled out across the country; Thatcher's government did, however, controversially introduce limited user fees for medical services.

Thatcher focused on downsizing the civil service, which was greatly expanded by the CCF. During the Thatcher years, many veteran Saskatchewan civil servants found themselves migrating to other provinces or to Lester Pearson's federal government—which focused largely on expanding the federal welfare state—and these migrants became known in government circles as the "Saskatchewan Mafia".

Thatcher called an early election in 1967 and won another majority. However, after the election Thatcher embraced a program of austerity, reducing spending and introducing medicare fees, which became derided as "deterrence fees". A downturn in the provincial economy further eroded the government's popularity. In a 1971 election that the Liberals framed as a choice between capitalism and socialism, the Liberals were soundly beaten by a resurgent CCF—now called the NDP—under the leadership of Allan Blakeney, who promised a return to the CCF approach of economic planning. Thatcher died suddenly just three weeks after the election, leaving the Opposition leaderless for most of the rest of the year. In 1975, the Liberals were able to hold on to their fifteen seats and remain the Opposition, but for the first time in more than forty years, the Conservatives—now the Progressive Conservatives (PCs)—won multiple seats.

=== Political wilderness (1978–1995) ===
The resurgence of the PCs under Dick Collver's leadership sapped support from the Liberals, and in the 1978 election, for the first time in their history, the Liberals failed to win a single seat, dropping to less than 15% support. The result was even worse in 1982; while the PCs surged to power under Grant Devine, Liberals won less than five percent of the vote. Leader Ralph Goodale was able to return the party to the Legislature with his single seat in the 1986 election, a feat repeated by new leader Lynda Haverstock in the 1991 election. But for the better part of two decades the Liberals were largely on the outside of provincial politics. In addition to the PCs staking out a position on the right side of the political spectrum, space the Liberals had taken up firmly since the 1940s, this was exacerbated by the growing unpopularity of the federal Liberal Party in the province; the party's unpopular resource policies in the 1970s and early 1980s gave rise to a wave of powerful western alienation sentiment and damaged the Liberal brand. Moreover, Saskatchewan politics had become increasingly divided between perceived urban and rural issues, and the Liberal brand was particularly unpopular in rural areas.

Ahead of the 1995 election, the Liberals appeared poised to take advantage of a scandal-ridden Progressive Conservative Party badly damaged by an expense fraud scandal. For the first time since the 1970s, the Liberals returned to Official Opposition status. However, the party's eleven seats to the NDP's forty two were seen as a disappointment.

=== Dissent and decline (1995–2003) ===
Dissatisfaction within the Liberal caucus led to Haverstock's resignation as party leader shortly after the election. Jim Melenchuk was selected to replace Haverstock, but internal strife continued. Some of the more conservative members of the Liberal caucus were in discussion with PC members about joining forces and forming a new party. Then, in August 1997, four Liberal members—Bob Bjornerud, June Draude, Rod Gantefoer, and Ken Krawetz—joined four PC members in announcing the founding of the Saskatchewan Party. With eight members, the new party took Official Opposition status away from the Liberals.

In the wake of the defections, remaining Liberals tended to put into question how much the new party was a Liberal-Conservative coalition, suggesting that the Liberals who joined the new party were right-wingers resisting a move towards the centre that much of the Liberal Party felt was necessary. Like the NDP under leader Roy Romanow, the Liberals characterized the Saskatchewan Party as merely a re-branded PC Party.

In the 1999 election, the NDP were reduced to 29 seats, one shy of a majority, while the Saskatchewan Party surged to 25 seats, almost exclusively rural. The Liberals' four seats gave them the balance of power, and Melenchuk agreed to enter into a coalition government with Romanow along with fellow Liberals Ron Osika and Jack Hillson. While Melenchuk hoped that the move would allow the Liberals to regain some influence, he found the Romanow government itself was quite centrist. The coalition also divided the party again; Melenchuk was removed as leader—he and coalition partner Osika would contest the 2003 election as NDP members—and was replaced by David Karwacki when he defeated Hillson, who himself had withdrawn from the coalition. Karwacki ordered Melenchuk and Osika to withdraw the coalition, but they refused.

=== Marginal status and failed re-brand (2003–2026) ===
Party logo used c. 2009–2022.

Karwacki saw an opportunity to become the more left-wing alternative to the Saskatchewan Party. However, he took over a party that had lost much of its membership and financial backing. The party was shut out of the Legislature in both the 2003 and 2007 elections as the province returned to a two-party system now dominated by the NDP and the Saskatchewan Party; Liberal support dropped from over 20% in 1999 to below 10% in 2007. The losses sparked discussion of Karwacki's future as leader. He resigned before the end of 2007, with party president Frank Proto taking over on an interim basis. This marked the beginning of an accelerated period of decline in which the party continued to lose support at the polls. Ryan Bater was introduced as the new Liberal leader in February 2009; at the same time, the party voted to disaffiliate itself from the federal Liberal Party, ending an affiliation that dated back more than a century. This did not change the party's fortunes; in the 2011 election, the Liberals ran only nine candidates and support fell to below one percent, with the Green Party surpassing the Liberals in popular support. Bater resigned as leader on January 31, 2012, and Greg Gallager was appointed interim leader. In 2013, Reid Hill was set to be acclaimed the party's new leader as the only declared candidate. However, he decided not to take the position, stating that he had hoped for a competitive race to revive public interest in the party, rather than simply being handed the leadership due to lack of interest. Darrin Lamoureux was appointed interim leader on December 16, 2013, and was acclaimed the leader on August 21, 2014, when no other candidates ran for the position.

The party managed to field a full slate of 61 candidates for the 2016 general election, and they finished third among parties with 3.6% support. However, they were once again shut out of the Legislature. Lamoureux resigned as party leader on September 9, 2017, and Tara Jijian was appointed interim leader. Former NDP candidate Naveed Anwar was acclaimed as party leader on May 5, 2018. However, Anwar resigned as leader on September 9, 2020, just weeks before the 2020 election. The party had again been set back by in-fighting, with Anwar and the executive at odds over election candidates and the state of the party. Robert Rudachyk was appointed as the party's interim leader for the election. Running only three candidates, the party received just 355 votes, marking the worst performance in party history.

==== Saskatchewan Progress Party ====
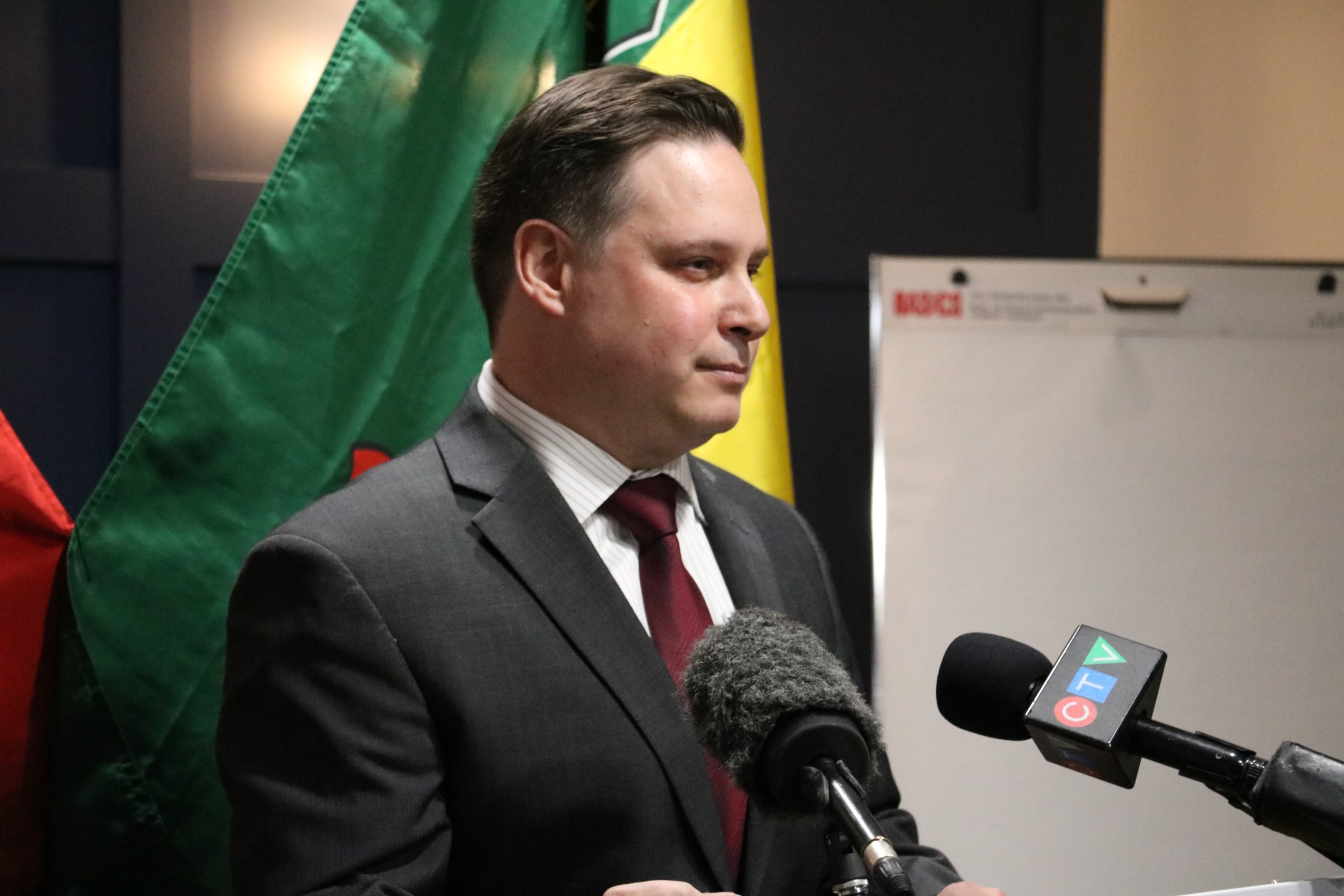
Jeff Walters led the party from 2021 to 2023 and led re-branding of the party to the Saskatchewan Progress Party.

Party logo from 2023–2026.

Following the 2020 provincial election, the party set about looking for a new permanent leader. In 2021, members unanimously acclaimed University of Regina lecturer Jeff Walters as the new leader. Walters emphasized the need in the province for a centrist alternative to the main parties, as well as the distinction of his 'prairie Liberalism' from that of the federal Liberals. Walters worked to increase his party's visibility in challenging the Saskatchewan Party on its handling of the COVID-19 pandemic. On February 5, 2022, Walters organized a rally in front of the Legislature to oppose the end of COVID-19 mandates. Walters also launched "Accountability Saskatchewan", collecting signatures to trigger a plebiscite on a public inquiry into the government's handling of the pandemic. The petition was initially available only online, provoking an official ruling from Elections Saskatchewan affirming the validity of electronic signatures for this purpose in Saskatchewan.

In March 2023, party members voted to change the party name in order to distance themselves from the non-affiliated federal Liberals. In July 2023, the party announced its rebranding as the Saskatchewan Progress Party. Walters stated that the new name was intended to "portray ourselves as visionaries", and that the party hoped to be a "post-partisan or post-ideological party". He stated an intention to focus on finance reform, government accountability, and 'green' energy.

In September 2023, Walters announced his resignation as leader and his intent to step away from politics. He remained on as interim leader of the party until the scheduled leadership election in November 2023. Walters later ran in Regina—Wascana at the 2025 Canadian federal election, placing second. Walters ran for the federal Liberals despite having supported the change of name of the provincial party to distance itself from the federal Liberals.

After the scheduled election failed to produce a new party leader, Nathan Bruce was listed as the interim leader in December 2023. In January 2024, Teunis Peters was listed as the party's new interim leader. None of those changes improved party fortunes; the party again nominated only three candidates ahead of the 2024 provincial election, and received only a few hundred votes for the second consecutive election, by far the fewest among registered parties.

On October 9, 2026, the party was de-registered by Elections Saskatchewan.

== Ideology ==
The Saskatchewan Progress Party underwent a number of ideological shifts over its history, often responding to political developments around it. For the first few decades of the party's existence, the Saskatchewan Liberals were relatively closely aligned with the Canadian liberalism espoused by the federal Liberal Party. Liberal Prime Minister Mackenzie King even successfully represented the Saskatchewan district of Prince Albert in Parliament from 1926 to 1946. However, the emergence of the Co-operative Commonwealth Federation as a political force in the province led to a rightward shift for the Liberals, as they began fighting elections as an explicitly free-enterprise and anti-socialist party.

The re-emergence of the Progressive Conservative Party in the 1970s forced another re-evaluation for the Liberals. By the 1990s, the party was attempting a more centrist approach between those of the PCs and the NDP; however, the Liberal caucus itself proved divided between left- and right-leaning members, leading to a split that helped create the Saskatchewan Party. However, another major factor in Liberal party fortunes was a continued association with the federal Liberals, even after they disaffiliated in 2009. This was seen as particularly difficult for the party after the 1970s, when federal Liberal policies inflamed expressions of western alienation.

In its late years, the party emphasized that it was a centrist party. However, political observers noted that early in the twenty-first century, Saskatchewan parties had "crowded towards... the ideological centre", while more recent years were marked by political polarization. The party's last permanent leader, Jeff Walters, suggested that the re-branded Saskatchewan Progress Party strove to become "post-ideological", emphasizing the need to pursue policy that "gives the greatest good to the greatest number of people".

== Party leaders ==
† Denotes vacant or acting/interim leader

#	Party Leader	Highest Position	Tenure	Notes
1	Walter Scott	Premier	August 16, 1905 – October 20, 1916	First Premier of the province of Saskatchewan
2	William Martin	Premier	October 20, 1916 – April 5, 1922	
3	Charles Dunning	Premier	April 5, 1922 – February 26, 1926	
4	Jimmy Gardiner	Premier	February 26, 1926 – October 31, 1935	Leader of the Opposition from 1929 to 1934
5	William John Patterson	Premier	October 31, 1935 – August 6, 1946	Leader of the Opposition from 1944 to 1946
6	Walter Tucker	Leader of the Opposition	August 6, 1946 – November 26, 1954	
7	Alexander H. McDonald	Leader of the Opposition	November 26, 1954 – September 24, 1959	
8	Ross Thatcher	Premier	September 24, 1959 – July 22, 1971	Last Liberal to serve as Premier
9	David Steuart	Leader of the Opposition	December 11, 1971 – December 11, 1976	Served as House Leader from July 22, 1971 to December 11, 1971
10	Ted Malone	Leader of the Opposition	December 11, 1976 – June 13, 1981	
11	Ralph Goodale	Party leader	June 13, 1981 – October 7, 1988	Resigned in 1988 to run for federal Liberals; elected MP in 1993
†	Vacant	—	October 7, 1988 - April 2, 1989	Jack Wiebe served as party president
12	Lynda Haverstock	Leader of the Opposition	April 2, 1989 – November 12, 1995	Became 19th Lieutenant Governor of Saskatchewan in 2000
†	Ron Osika	Leader of the Opposition	November 12, 1995 - November 24, 1996	Interim leader
13	Jim Melenchuk	Party leader	November 24, 1996 – October 27, 2001	As Melenchuk did not hold a seat in the Legislature until 1999, Ken Krawetz served as Opposition leader
14	David Karwacki	Party leader	October 27, 2001 – December 21, 2007	
†	Frank Proto	Party leader	December 21, 2007 – February 21, 2009	Interim leader
15	Ryan Bater	Party leader	February 21, 2009 – March 12, 2012	
†	Greg Gallagher	Party leader	March 12, 2012 – December 16, 2013	Interim leader
16	Darrin Lamoureux	Party leader	December 16, 2013 – September 9, 2017	Was interim leader from December 16, 2013 to August 21, 2014
†	Tara Jijian	Party leader	September 24, 2017 – May 5, 2018	Interim leader
17	Naveed Anwar	Party leader	May 5, 2018 – September 9, 2020	
†	Robert Rudachyk	Party leader	September 28, 2020 – October 16, 2021	Interim leader
18	Jeff Walters	Party leader	October 16, 2021 – November 18, 2023	Led re-naming of party to SPP; Was interim leader from September 29, 2023 to November 18, 2023
†	Nathan Bruce	Party leader	December 18, 2023 – January 15, 2024	Interim leader
†	Teunis Peters	Party leader	January 15, 2024 – October 9, 2026	Interim leader

== Election results ==
Final party logo under the Liberal Party brand c. 2022–2023.

=== Legislative Assembly ===
Election	Leader	Votes	%	Seats	+/–	Position	Status
1905	Walter Scott	17,812	52.3	16 / 25	▲16	▲1st	Majority
1908	Walter Scott	29,807	50.8	27 / 41	▲11	1st	Majority
1912	Walter Scott	50,004	57.0	45 / 53	▲18	1st	Majority
1917	William Martin	106,552	56.7	51 / 62	▲6	1st	Majority
1921	William Martin	92,983	51.4	45 / 63	▼6	1st	Majority
1925	Charles Dunning	127,751	51.5	50 / 63	▲2	1st	Majority
1929	James Gardiner	164,487	45.6	28 / 63	▼22	1st	Minority (1929)^{[a]}
1929	James Gardiner	164,487	45.6	28 / 63	▼22	1st	Opposition (1929–1934)
1934	James Gardiner	206,212	48.0	50 / 55	▲22	1st	Majority
1938	William Patterson	200,334	45.5	38 / 52	▼12	1st	Majority
1944	William Patterson	140,901	35.4	5 / 52	▼33	▼2nd	Opposition
1948	Walter Tucker	152,400	30.6	19 / 52	▲14	2nd	Opposition
1952	Walter Tucker	211,882	39.3	11 / 53	▼8	2nd	Opposition
1956	Alexander McDonald	167,427	30.3	14 / 53	▲3	2nd	Opposition
1960	Ross Thatcher	221,932	32.7	17 / 54	▲3	2nd	Opposition
1964	Ross Thatcher	269,402	40.4	32 / 59	▲15	▲1st	Majority
1967	Ross Thatcher	193,871	45.6	35 / 59	▲3	1st	Majority
1971	Ross Thatcher	193,864	42.8	15 / 60	▼20	▼2nd	Opposition
1975	David Steuart	142,853	31.7	15 / 61	Steady	2nd	Opposition
1978	Ted Malone	65,498	13.8	0 / 61	▼15	▼3rd	No seats
1982	Ralph Goodale	24,134	4.5	0 / 64	Steady	3rd	No seats
1986	Ralph Goodale	54,739	10.0	1 / 64	▲1	3rd	Third party
1991	Lynda Haverstock	125,814	23.3	1 / 66	Steady	3rd	Third party
1995	Lynda Haverstock	141,873	34.7	11 / 58	▲10	▲2nd	Opposition (1995–1997)
1995	Lynda Haverstock	141,873	34.7	11 / 58	▲10	▲2nd	Third party (1997–1999)^{[b]}
1999	Jim Melenchuk	81,694	20.2	4 / 58	▼7	▼3rd	Third party^{[c]}
2003	David Karwacki	60,601	14.2	0 / 58	▼4	3rd	No seats
2007	David Karwacki	42,585	9.4	0 / 58	Steady	3rd	No seats
2011	Ryan Bater	2,237	0.6	0 / 58	Steady	▼4th	No seats
2016	Darrin Lamoureux	15,568	3.6	0 / 61	Steady	▲3rd	No seats
2020	Robert Rudachyk	355	0.1	0 / 61	Steady	▼6th	No seats
Renamed to Saskatchewan Progress Party in 2023.
2024	Teunis Peters	536	0.2	0 / 61	Steady	▼7th	No seats

=== Notes ===
^{a} The Liberals secured the most seats in 1929, but they were short of a majority and failed to secure the confidence of the Legislature. This enabled a coalition government to form and made the Liberals the Official Opposition.
^{b} The Liberals began this Legislature as the Opposition. However, four Liberal MLAs left the party in 1997 to help form the Saskatchewan Party, which immediately surpassed the Liberals in size and took over as the Opposition.
^{c} Although initial reports had the Liberals winning four seats, the result in Wood River was ultimately overturned by the courts and the ensuing by-election was won by the Saskatchewan Party candidate, leaving the Liberals with three seats.

== See also ==
- Saskatchewan Liberal Party leadership conventions
- Politics of Saskatchewan
- List of Saskatchewan political parties
