= 22nd Saskatchewan Legislature =

The 22nd Legislative Assembly of Saskatchewan was elected in the 1991 Saskatchewan election. It was controlled by the New Democratic Party under Premier Roy Romanow. With 66 representatives elected, the 22nd Assembly had the largest number of MLAs in Saskatchewan history.

In the fall of 1992 former premier Grant Devine resigned as leader of the opposition Progressive Conservative party. Richard Swenson temporarily led the PC caucus from 1992 to 1994, then was succeeded by Bill Boyd for the remaining year of the 22nd Assembly.

== Members elected ==
Names in bold represent party leaders and the Speaker.

District	Member	Party	First elected / previously elected	No.# of term(s)
Arm River	Gerald Muirhead	Progressive Conservative	1978	4th term
Assiniboia-Gravelbourg	Lewis Draper	New Democrat	1991	1st term
Athabasca	Fred Thompson	New Democrat	1975	5th term
Biggar	Grant Whitmore	New Democrat	1991	1st term
Bengough-Milestone	Judy Bradley	New Democrat	1991	1st term
Canora	Darrel Cunningham	New Democrat	1991	1st term
Cumberland	Keith Goulet	New Democrat	1986	2nd term
Cut Knife-Lloydminster	Violet Stanger	New Democrat	1991	1st term
Estevan	**Grant Devine**	Progressive Conservative	1982	3rd term
Humboldt	Eric Upshall	New Democrat	1986	2nd term
Indian Head-Wolseley	Lorne Scott	New Democrat	1991	1st term
Kelsey-Tisdale	Andy Renaud	New Democrat	1991	1st term
Kelvington-Wadena	Kenneth Kluz	New Democrat	1991	1st term
Kindersley	**Bill Boyd**	Progressive Conservative	1991	1st term
Kinistino	Armand Roy	New Democrat	1991	1st term
Last Mountain-Touchwood	Dale Flavel	New Democrat	1991	1st term
Maple Creek	Jack Goohsen	Progressive Conservative	1991	1st term
Meadow Lake	Maynard Sonntag	New Democrat	1991	1st term
Melfort	Carol Carson	New Democrat	1991	1st term
Melville	Evan Carlson	New Democrat	1991	1st term
Moose Jaw Palliser	Glenn Hagel	New Democrat	1986	2nd term
Moose Jaw Wakamow	Lorne Calvert	New Democrat	1986	2nd term
Morse	Harold Martens	Progressive Conservative	1982	3rd term
Moosomin	Don Toth	Progressive Conservative	1986	2nd term
Nipawin	Tom Keeping	New Democrat	1991	1st term
Pelly	Ron Harper	New Democrat	1991	1st term
Prince Albert Carlton	Myron Kowalsky	New Democrat	1986	2nd term
Prince Albert Northcote	Eldon Lautermilch	New Democrat	1986	2nd term
Qu'Appelle-Lumsden	Suzanne Murray	New Democrat	1991	1st term
Quill Lakes	Murray Koskie	New Democrat	1975	5th term
Redberry	Walter Jess	New Democrat	1991	1st term
Regina Albert North	Kim Trew	New Democrat	1986	2nd term
Regina Albert South	Serge Kujawa	New Democrat	1991	1st term
Regina Churchill Downs	Edward Shillington	New Democrat	1975	5th term
Regina Dewdney	Edwin Tchorzewski	New Democrat	1971, (Note: Humboldt) 1985	6th term*
Regina Elphinstone	Dwain Lingenfelter	New Democrat	1978, (Note: Shaunavon) 1988	4th term*
Regina Hillsdale	Rose Marie Simard	New Democrat	1986	2nd term
Regina Lake Centre	Joanne Crofford	New Democrat	1991	1st term
Regina North West	John Solomon	New Democrat	1979, 1986	3rd term*
Regina North West	Anita Bergman (1994)	Liberal	1994	1st term
Regina Rosemont	Robert Lyons	New Democrat	1986	2nd term
Regina Victoria	Harry Van Mulligen	New Democrat	1986	2nd term
Regina Wascana Plains	Doreen Hamilton	New Democrat	1991	1st term
Rosetown-Elrose	Berny Wiens	New Democrat	1991	1st term
Rosthern	William Neudorf	Progressive Conservative	1986	2nd term
Saltcoats	Reg Knezacek	New Democrat	1991	1st term
Saskatoon Broadway	Pat Atkinson	New Democrat	1986	2nd term
Saskatoon Eastview-Haultain	Bob Pringle	New Democrat	1988	2nd term
Saskatoon Fairview	Bob Mitchell	New Democrat	1986	2nd term
Saskatoon Greystone	**Lynda Haverstock**	Liberal	1991	1st term
Saskatoon Idylwyld	Eric Cline	New Democrat	1991	1st term
Saskatoon Nutana	**Herman Rolfes**	New Democrat	1971, 1986	5th term*
Saskatoon River Heights	Carol Teichrob	New Democrat	1991	1st term
Saskatoon Riversdale	**Roy Romanow**	New Democrat	1967, 1986	6th term*
Saskatoon Sutherland-University	Mark Koenker	New Democrat	1986	2nd term
Saskatoon Westmount	Janice MacKinnon	New Democrat	1991	1st term
Saskatoon Wildwood	Pat Lorje	New Democrat	1991	1st term
Shaunavon	Glen McPherson	New Democrat	1991	1st term
Shellbrook-Torch River	Jack Langford	New Democrat	1991	1st term
Souris-Cannington	Dan D'Autremont	Progressive Conservative	1991	1st term
Swift Current	John Penner	New Democrat	1991	1st term
The Battlefords	Doug Anguish	New Democrat	1986	2nd term
Thunder Creek	**Richard Swenson**	Progressive Conservative	1985	3rd term
Turtleford	Lloyd Johnson	New Democrat	1975, 1991	3rd term*
Wilkie	John Britton	Progressive Conservative	1986	2nd term
Weyburn	Ronald Wormsbecker	New Democrat	1991	1st term
Yorkton	Clay Serby	New Democrat	1991	1st term

== See also ==
- List of Saskatchewan provincial electoral districts
