= 1991 Saskatchewan general election =

Canadian provincial election

- October 21, 1991

66 seats in the Legislative Assembly of Saskatchewan 34 seats needed for a majority
- Turnout: 83.2% (▲1.1pp)
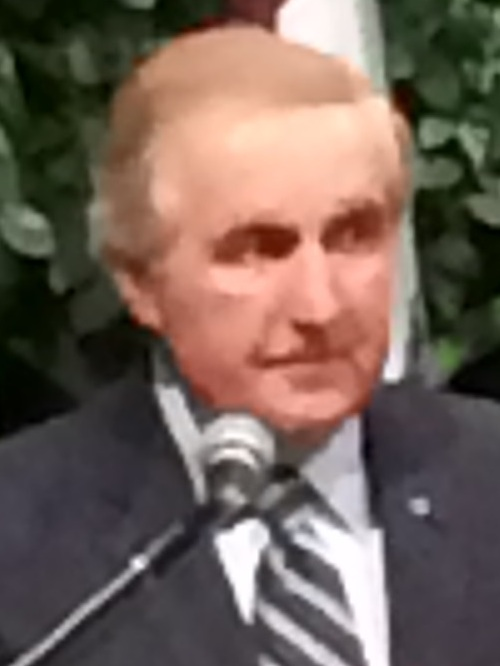

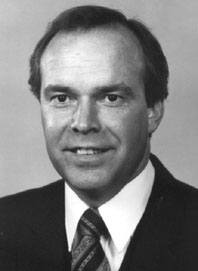

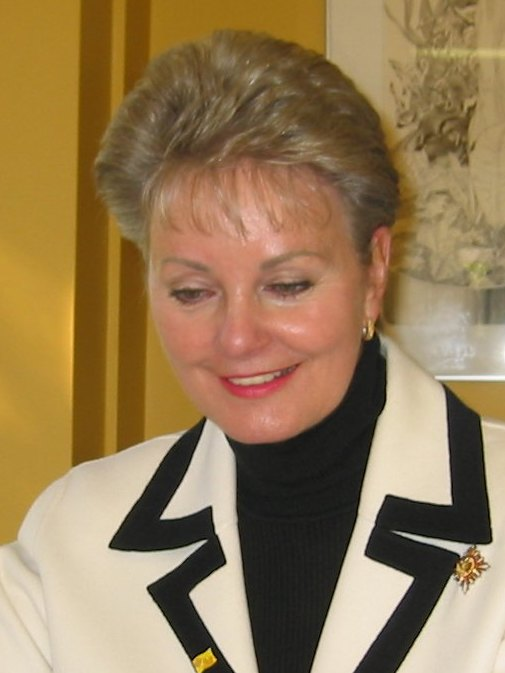
	First party	Second party	Third party
Leader	Roy Romanow	Grant Devine	Lynda Haverstock
Party	New Democratic	Progressive Conservative	Liberal
Leader since	November 7, 1987	November 9, 1979	April 2, 1989
Leader's seat	Saskatoon Riversdale	Estevan	Saskatoon Greystone
Last election	25	38	1
Seats before	26	38	0
Seats won	55	10	1
Seat change	▲29	▼28	▲1
Popular vote	275,780	137,994	125,814
Percentage	51.05%	25.54%	23.29%
Swing	▲5.85pp	▼19.07pp	▲13.30pp
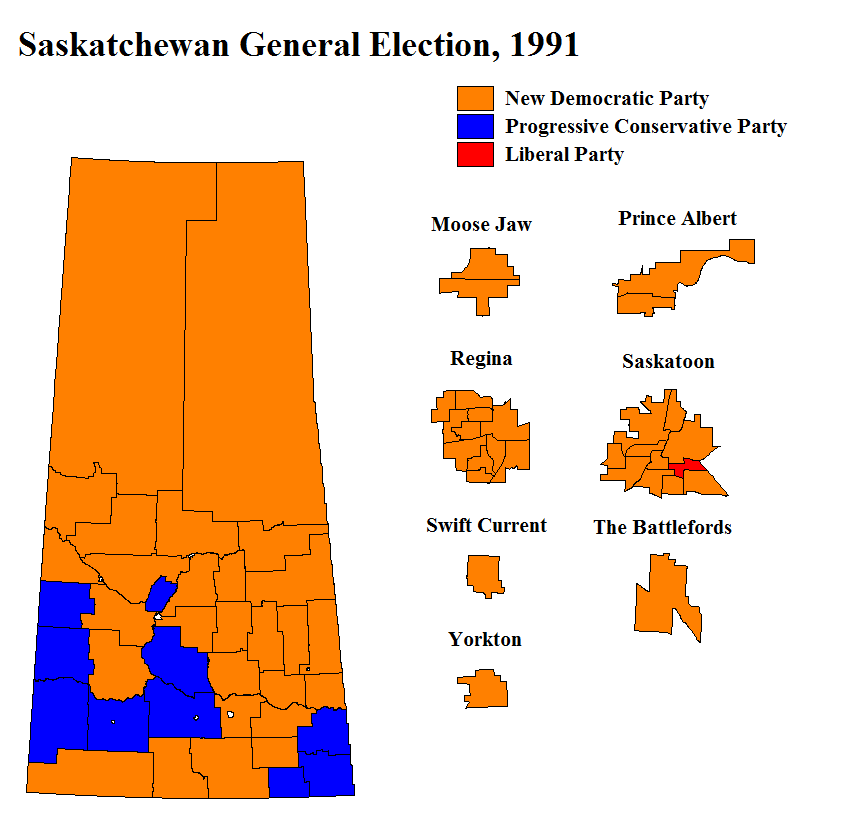
Premier before election
Grant Devine
Progressive Conservative
Premier after election
Roy Romanow
New Democratic

The 1991 Saskatchewan general election was held on October 21, 1991, to elect members of the Legislative Assembly of Saskatchewan.

The Progressive Conservative government of Premier Grant Devine was defeated by the New Democratic Party, led by former provincial Attorney General Roy Romanow. A major source of dissatisfaction with the Grant Devine government was the "Fair Share Saskatchewan" program, a scheme to distribute public service jobs more evenly across the province; a plan especially unpopular with workers scheduled to be relocated from Regina to rural districts. The Devine government was also notorious for a home construction and renovation relief program which reimbursed homeowners who did their own renovations. Another factor was the unpopularity of the federal Progressive Conservatives under then Prime Minister Brian Mulroney.

The NDP was able to win more than half of the popular vote, and an overwhelming majority in the legislature. The Tories lost almost three-quarters of the seats they had held in the legislature, and a significant share of the popular vote. Their loss in vote percentage resulted in 30 third-place finishes; this was more than their 26 second-place finishes or their ten seats won.

The Liberal Party – led by Lynda Haverstock – was able to attract a substantial share of disaffected Tory voters. However, despite winning almost one-quarter of the vote, their support was too spread out across the province to translate into seats. Haverstock was the only Liberal returned to the legislature.

== Results ==
Party	Party leader	Candidates	Seats				Popular vote		
Party	Party leader	Candidates	1986	Dissol.	Elected	% Change	#	%	% Change
New Democratic	Roy Romanow	66	25	26	55	+112%	275,780	51.05%	+5.85%
Progressive Conservative	Grant Devine	66	38	38	10	-73.7%	137,994	25.54%	-19.07%
Liberal	Lynda Haverstock	66	1	0	1	–	125,814	23.29%	+13.30%
Independent		8	–	–	–	–	592	0.11%	+0.04%
Independence (Western Canada Concept)	Hilton J. Spencer (default)	1	–	–	–	–	46	0.01%	-0.07%
Total		207	64	64	66	+3.1%	540,226	100%	
Source: Elections Saskatchewan

=== Percentages ===
Popular vote
New Democratic	51.05%
PC	25.54%
Liberal	23.29%
Others	0.12%

Seats summary
New Democratic	83.33%
PC	15.15%
Liberal	1.52%

=== Ranking ===
Party	Seats	Second	Third	Fourth
New Democratic	55	10	1	0
Progressive Conservative	10	26	30	0
Liberal	1	30	35	0
Independent	0	0	0	9

== Riding results ==
Names in bold represent cabinet ministers and the Speaker. Party leaders are italicized. The symbol " ** " represents MLAs who are not running again.

=== Northwest Saskatchewan ===
Electoral district	Candidates				Incumbent
Electoral district	NDP	PC	Liberal	Other	Incumbent
Athabasca	Fred Thompson; 3,253	Frank Petit; 331	Darren McKee; 184	Mike Daley (Ind.); 114	Fred Thompson
Cut Knife-Lloydminster	Violet Stanger; 3,843	Michael Hopfner; 2,899	Aldo Del Frari; 1,333		Michael Hopfner
Meadow Lake	Maynard Sonntag; 3,719	George McLeod; 3,065	Burton Dougan; 467		George McLeod
Redberry	Walter Jess; 3,493	John Gerich; 3,206	Ken Finlayson; 1,185		John Gerich
Rosthern	Kim Dmytryshyn; 2,897	William Neudorf; 4,183	Phil Biggs; 1,825		William Neudorf
The Battlefords	Doug Anguish; 5,805	Jim Hampson; 1,683	Donna Challis; 2,417		Doug Anguish
Turtleford	Lloyd Johnson; 3,269	Jerry Spenst; 2,034	Neil Currie; 1,239		Colin Maxwell**

=== Northeast Saskatchewan ===
Electoral district	Candidates				Incumbent
Electoral district	NDP	PC	Liberal	Other	Incumbent
Cumberland	Keith Goulet; 4,135	Louis Bear; 482	Lennard Morin; 505		Keith Goulet
Kelsey-Tisdale	Andy Renaud; 3,871	Neal Hardy; 2,783	Walt Roberts; 853		Neal Hardy
Kinistino	Armand Roy; 4,298	Josef Saxinger; 2,918	Frank Orosz; 1,326		Josef Saxinger
Melfort	Carol Carson; 3,011	Ken Naber; 2,516	Rod Gantefoer; 1,795		Grant Hodgins
Nipawin	Tom Keeping; 3,238	Jim Taylor; 2,784	Richard Makowsky; 1,134		Lloyd Sauder**
Prince Albert Carlton	Myron Kowalsky; 5,218	Bert Provost; 1,635	Richard Stewart; 1,888		Myron Kowalsky; Prince Albert
Prince Albert Northcote	Eldon Lautermilch; 5,405	Terry Wiebe; 990	Hannah Shenouda; 1,549		Eldon Lautermilch; Prince Albert-Duck Lake
Shellbrook-Torch River	Jack Langford; 4,098	Lloyd Muller; 2,358	Walter Billay; 1,177		Lloyd Muller

=== West Central Saskatchewan ===
Electoral district	Candidates				Incumbent
Electoral district	NDP	PC	Liberal	Other	Incumbent
Arm River	Bob Robertson; 2,538	Gerald Muirhead; 3,019	David Ashdown; 2,301	Hilton J. Spencer (Ind.-WCC) 46	Gerald Muirhead
Biggar	Grant Whitmore; 3,710	Harry Baker; 2,307	Larry Toner; 1,708	Donald W. Kavanagh (Ind.) 65	Harry Baker
Humboldt	Eric Upshall; 4,422	Dale Blair; 49	Arlene Julé; 2,686		Eric Upshall
Kindersley	Lorne Johnston; 2,014	Bill Boyd; 2,766	Judy Setrakov; 2,244		Bob Andrew**
Rosetown-Elrose	Berny Wiens; 2,666	Ansgar Tynning; 2,581	Linda Trytten; 1,583		Herb Swan**
Wilkie	Sharon Murrell; 2,295	John Britton; 2,601	Nick Volk; 1,853		John Britton

=== East Central Saskatchewan ===
Electoral district	Candidates				Incumbent
Electoral district	NDP	PC	Liberal	Other	Incumbent
Canora	Darrel Cunningham; 3,564	Lorne Kopelchuk; 2,746	Roy Petrowicz; 831		Lorne Kopelchuk
Kelvington-Wadena	Kenneth Kluz; 3,956	Sherwin Petersen; 2,594	Bill Kerluke; 730		Sherwin Petersen
Last Mountain-Touchwood	Dale Flavel; 4,028	Arnold Tusa; 2,523	Ed Bespalko; 1,691	Paul Chesterton (Ind.) 47	Arnold Tusa
Melville	Evan Carlson; 3,656	Grant Schmidt; 3,048	Ray Chastkavich; 1,262		Grant Schmidt
Pelly	Ron Harper; 3,992	Bernard Rink; 2,055	Louis Sliwa; 652		Rod Gardner**
Quill Lakes	Murray Koskie; 3,621	Glen Leggott; 2,357	Lou Coderre; 1,297		Murray Koskie
Saltcoats	Reg Knezacek; 3,745	Rod Roden; 2,356	Leslie Popp; 1,033		Walter Johnson**
Yorkton	Clay Serby; 4,897	Brian Fromm; 1,846	Donna Yaholnitsky; 1,560		Lorne McLaren**

=== Southwest Saskatchewan ===
Electoral district	Candidates				Incumbent
Electoral district	NDP	PC	Liberal	Other	Incumbent
Assiniboia-Gravelbourg	Lewis Draper; 2,647	John Wolfe; 2,583	Tim Connors; 2,148		John Wolfe
Maple Creek	Bryan Oster; 1,987	Jack Goohsen; 2,627	Shirley Helmerson; 1,865		Jack Goohsen
Moose Jaw Palliser	Glenn Hagel; 5,681	Colleen Basarsky; 1,920	Michael Klein; 2,120		Glenn Hagel; Moose Jaw North
Moose Jaw Wakamow	Lorne Calvert; 6,083	Lisa Acton; 1,164	Randy Roman; 1,799		Lorne Calvert; Moose Jaw South
Morse	Carl Siemens; 2,101	Harold Martens; 2,682	Ken Nelson; 1,255		Harold Martens
Shaunavon	Glen McPherson; 2,350	Ted Gleim; 2,222	Jerry Ruehs; 1,733		Ted Gleim
Swift Current	John Penner; 4,399	Lawrence Bergreen; 2,731	Archie Green; 1,503		Pat Smith**
Thunder Creek	Ron Bishoff; 2,240	Rick Swenson; 2,929	Bill Johnstone; 1,639	Dwayne S. McBride (Ind.) 66	Rick Swenson

=== Southeast Saskatchewan ===
Electoral district	Candidates				Incumbent
Electoral district	NDP	PC	Liberal	Other	Incumbent
Bengough-Milestone	Judy Bradley; 2,419	Darrell Rodine; 2,297	Laurie Unruh; 1,665		Bob Pickering**
Estevan	Leonard Haukeness; 3,404	**Grant Devine**; 4,079	Bob Jones; 1,889		Grant Devine
Indian Head-Wolseley	Lorne Scott; 2,725	Dwight Dunn; 2,066	Jack Hosler; 2,069		Doug Taylor**
Moosomin	Mary McGuire; 2,954	Don Toth; 3,005	Keith Lewis; 1,475		Don Toth
Qu’Appelle-Lumsden	Suzanne Murray; 4,907	Martin Kenney; 2,426	Dawn Garner; 2,827		John Lane**
Souris-Cannington	Ross Arthur; 1,912	Dan D'Autremont; 2,980	Don Lees; 1,815		Eric Berntson**
Weyburn	Ronald Wormsbecker; 3,883	Lorne Hepworth; 2,725	Bill Rudachyk; 1,920	Edwin Appenheimer (Ind.) 47	Lorne Hepworth

=== Saskatoon ===
Electoral district	Candidates				Incumbent
Electoral district	NDP	PC	Liberal	Other	Incumbent
Saskatoon Broadway	Pat Atkinson; 5,027	Lee Cutforth; 1,445	Jackie Stewart; 2,891	Greg Hill (Ind.) 107	Herman Rolfes; Saskatoon South
Saskatoon Eastview-Haultain	Bob Pringle; 4,630	Bob Myers; 1,698	Dan Kolysher; 2,485		Bob Pringle; Saskatoon Eastview
Saskatoon Fairview	Bob Mitchell; 5,955	Gaby Akl; 905	Bill Mellof; 2,084		Bob Mitchell
Saskatoon Greystone	Peter Prebble; 4,009	Gary Hellard; 1,094	Lynda Haverstock; 5,422	Leslie Cushion (Ind.) 40	New District
Saskatoon Idylwyld	Eric Cline; 5,986	Carol Zanon; 1,294	Roland Loewer; 2,562		Anne Smart**; Saskatoon Centre
Saskatoon Nutana	**Herman Rolfes**; 5,452	Jerry Ehalt; 1,264	Shirley Khan; 3,048		Pat Atkinson
Saskatoon River Heights	Carol Teichrob; 4,908	Ray Meiklejohn; 3,578	Ed Monuik; 2,955		Ray Meiklejohn; Saskatoon Mayfair
Saskatoon Riversdale	**Roy Romanow**; 5,254	Gay Caswell; 761	Gary La Plante; 1,398		Roy Romanow
Saskatoon Sutherland-University	Mark Koenker; 4,034	Jim Laing; 1,452	Robin Bellamy; 3,102		Mark Koenker; Saskatoon Sutherland
Saskatoon Westmount	Janice MacKinnon; 5,505	George Turanich; 1,008	Myron Luczka; 1,913		John Brockelbank**
Saskatoon Wildwood	Pat Lorje; 4,282	Joan Black; 2,509	David Clark; 3,123		New District

=== Regina ===
Electoral district	Candidates				Incumbent
Electoral district	NDP	PC	Liberal	Other	Incumbent
Regina Albert North	Kim Trew; 5,313	Roy Gaebel; 881	Phil Biggs; 2,520		Kim Trew; Regina North
Regina Albert South	Serge Kujawa; 4,333	Jack Klein; 1,761	Saul Jacobson; 3,133	John O'Donoghue (Ind.) 106	Jack Klein; Regina South
Regina Churchill Downs	Edward Shillington; 6,049	John Bergen; 661	Clyde Myhill; 1,939		Edwin Tchorzewski; Regina North East
Regina Dewdney	Edwin Tchorzewski; 6,695	Warne Rhoades; 990	Bob Newman; 1,969		New District
Regina Elphinstone	Dwain Lingenfelter; 6,505	Don Racette; 854	Cliff Chatterson; 1,673		Dwain Lingenfelter
Regina Hillsdale	Rose Marie Simard; 4,851	Shirley Schneider; 1,677	Larry Bird; 2,930		Rose Marie Simard; Regina Lakeview
Regina Lake Centre	Joanne Crofford; 6,286	Bill Pratt; 1,296	Michael R. Giles; 2,432		Edward Shillington; Regina Centre
Regina North West	John Solomon; 5,660	Jack Mock; 990	Liz Calvert; 2,670		John Solomon
Regina Rosemont	Robert Llewellyn Lyons; 6,406	Myrna Petersen; 1,031	John M. MacGowan; 2,383		Robert Lyons
Regina Victoria	Harry Van Mulligen; 5,759	Olga Stinson; 1,000	Louise Holloway; 2,066		Harry Van Mulligen
Regina Wascana Plains	Doreen Hamilton; 4,532	Gordon Martin; 2,148	Cam McCannell; 3,086		Gordon B. Martin; Regina Wascana

February 4, 1994 By-election: Regina North West
Party	Candidate	Votes	%	±%
Liberal	Anita Bergman	2,566	57.05	+28.40
NDP	Kathie Maher-Wolbaum	1,794	39.88	-20.85
Prog. Conservative	Harvey Schmidt	138	3.07	-7.55
Total		4,498	100.00	

== Opinion Polls ==
Maclean's (September 30, 1991)

- NDP- 63%
- Progressive Conservatives- 19%
- Liberals- 15%

== See also ==
- List of political parties in Saskatchewan
- List of Saskatchewan provincial electoral districts
