= Allen Engel =

Canadian politician (1932–2026)

Member of the Legislative Assembly of Saskatchewan
- In office 1978–1986
- Preceded by: Roy Edgar Nelson
- Succeeded by: Ralph Goodale
- Constituency: Assiniboia-Gravelbourg
- In office 1971–1975
- Preceded by: James Benjamin Hooker
- Constituency: Notukeu-Willow Bunch

Personal details
- Born: October 20, 1932 Gravelbourg, Saskatchewan, Canada
- Died: September 6, 2026 (aged 93)
- Party: Saskatchewan New Democratic Party
- Spouse: Joyce Beverly Baumbach (m. 1955)
- Occupation: farmer

Allen Willard Engel (October 20, 1932 – September 6, 2026) was a Canadian politician and farmer in the province of Saskatchewan. He represented Notukeu-Willow Bunch from 1971 to 1975 and Assiniboia-Gravelbourg from 1978 to 1986 in the Legislative Assembly of Saskatchewan as a New Democratic Party (NDP) member.

== Life and career ==
Allen Willard Engel was born in Gravelbourg, Saskatchewan on October 20, 1932, the son of Emil and Charlotte Engel. Engel studied at the Saskatchewan Teacher's College and taught school for several years. In 1955, he married Joyce Beverly Baumbach of Lodi, California. Engel ran unsuccessfully in the newly created Assiniboia-Gravelbourg riding in 1975 before being elected again in 1978.

He survived the Progressive Conservative landslide in 1982; Liberal leader Ralph Goodale was also running in the riding, turning the contest into a three-way race. However, Engel was defeated by Goodale when he ran for reelection to the assembly in 1986 and was defeated again by John Thomas Wolfe in a 1988 by-election held after Goodale ran for a federal seat. Engel served as the Legislative Secretary to the Minister of Agriculture from 1978 - 1982, and Agriculture Critic from 1982 - 1986. During his tenure, Engel was instrumental in the preservation of the Grasslands National Park in Southern Saskatchewan, home to some of the world's oldest varieties of virgin prairie. Engel also focussed his efforts on international development including supervising Saskatchewan matching grants for agricultural growth in Africa, and later serving on international development boards. A street in Regina, Saskatchewan was named to honour his service to the province in 2002.

Engel died on September 6, 2026, at the age of 93. He had Parkinson's disease in the ten years prior to his death.
