= Douglas MacArthur (disambiguation) =

Douglas MacArthur (1880–1964) was a leading US general.

Douglas MacArthur may also refer to:

- Douglas MacArthur II (1909–1997), American diplomat
- Douglas Hastings Macarthur (1839–1892), New Zealand politician

== See also ==
- Douglas Francis McArthur (born 1943), a university professor and former politician in Canada
