= Reuben Martin =

Canadian politician

Reuben Martin (January 20, 1877 – April 17, 1946) was a farmer and political figure in Saskatchewan. He represented Wilkie from 1917 to 1921 as a Liberal.

He was born in Ontario, learned to be a shoemaker and then, in 1894, travelled west to Boissevain, Manitoba, where he opened a men's clothing store. In 1906, he moved to Battleford, Saskatchewan. In 1909, he came to Macklin as manager of a lumber yard. Martin married Martha Ireland later that same year. They settled on a homestead north of Macklin. Martin served on the first town council for Macklin, was a member of the local school board, also serving as chairman, and was reeve of Eye Hill at the time of his death in 1946. He was defeated by Sidney Bingham when he ran for reelection in 1921.
