= Elwood Cowley =

Canadian politician

Elwood Lorrie Cowley (born August 2, 1944) is a former educator and political figure in Saskatchewan. He represented Biggar from 1971 to 1982 in the Legislative Assembly of Saskatchewan as a New Democratic Party (NDP) member.

He was born in Saskatoon, Saskatchewan, the son of William Cowley and Edwina Call, and was educated in Kinley and at the University of Saskatchewan, where he received a BEd. Cowley taught high school from 1965 to 1972. In 1965, he married Delores Major. Cowley served in the provincial cabinet as Minister of Finance, as Minister of Mineral Resources, as Provincial Secretary and as Minister of Economic Development. He was defeated by Harry Baker when he ran for reelection to the Saskatchewan assembly in 1982. After leaving politics, Cowley taught school and worked as an investment broker. In 1989, he established Cowley Consulting Ltd. As of 2009, he lived in Saskatoon.
