= Cliff McIsaac =

Canadian politician

MLA for Wilkie
- In office 1964–1974
- Preceded by: John Horsman
- Succeeded by: Linda Clifford

Personal details
- Born: August 30, 1930
- Died: July 25, 2006 (aged 75)
- Party: Saskatchewan Liberal Party
- Profession: Veterinarian

Joseph Clifford (Cliff) McIsaac, (August 30, 1930 – July 25, 2006) was a politician, public servant and veterinarian.

Born and raised in Prince Edward Island, McIsaac graduated from the Truro Agricultural College in 1950 and the Ontario Veterinary College in 1955. Later, he moved then to Saskatchewan to establish his practice.

McIsaac entered politics in the province and was elected to the Saskatchewan legislature in the 1964 provincial election as the Liberal MLA for Wilkie. He was appointed by Premier Ross Thatcher as Minister of Municipal Affairs from 1965 until 1971 and then as Minister of Education in the provincial cabinet from 1967 until the government's defeat in the 1971 provincial election.

He was elected to the House of Commons of Canada in the 1974 federal election for the riding of Battleford—Kindersley. During the 30th Canadian Parliament, he sat in the federal Liberal caucus, led by Prime Minister Pierre Trudeau, serving as a parliamentary secretary and then Government Whip. His riding was abolished, replaced by The Battlefords—Meadow Lake, and he was defeated in the 1979 and 1980 federal elections. After leaving politics, McIsaac served as a commissioner of the Canadian Dairy Commission and chair of the National Farm Products Marketing Council.
