= John Meikle (Saskatchewan politician) =

Canadian politician

John Meikle (February 4, 1870 – April 15, 1964) was a Scottish-born farmer and political figure in Saskatchewan. He represented Biggar in the Legislative Assembly of Saskatchewan from 1921 to 1925 as a Progressive Party member.

He was born in West Calder, the son of Andrew Meikle and Helen Thompson, and came to Canada in 1906. In 1891, Meikle married Martha Smillie. He was chairman of the agricultural society, of the rural telephone company and of the local school board. Meikle served as reeve of the Rural Municipality of Rosemount No. 378 from 1912 to 1914. He was defeated by Robert Pelham Hassard when he ran for reelection to the provincial assembly in 1925.
