= Regina Churchill Downs =

Former provincial electoral district in Saskatchewan, Canada

Saskatchewan electoral district

Defunct provincial electoral district
- Legislature: Legislative Assembly of Saskatchewan
- District created: 1991
- First contested: 1991
- Last contested: 1991

Demographics
- Census division(s): Division 6
- Census subdivision(s): Regina

Regina Churchill Downs was a provincial electoral district for the Legislative Assembly of Saskatchewan, Canada. It consisted of the Regina neighbourhoods of Churchill Downs, Coronation Park, City View, and Highland Park.

It existed for one election in 1991. It was created out of parts of Regina North West, Regina North and Regina North East. It was abolished into Regina Coronation Park and Regina Northeast.

== Members of the Legislative Assembly ==
Legislature	Years	Member	Party
22nd	1991–1995	Edward Shillington	New Democrat

== Election results ==
1991 Saskatchewan general election
Party	Candidate	Votes	%
New Democratic	Edward Shillington	6,049	69.94
Liberal	Clyde Myhill	1,939	22.42
Progressive Conservative	John Bergen	661	7.64
Total valid votes		8,649	99.51
Total rejected ballots		43	0.49
Turnout		8,692	82.81
Eligible voters		10,496	
Source: Elections Saskatchewan

== See also ==
- List of Saskatchewan provincial electoral districts
- List of Saskatchewan general elections
