= Hans Ove Hansen =

Canadian politician

Hans Ove Hansen (August 14, 1904 – July 3, 1994) was an American-born farmer and political figure in Saskatchewan. He represented Wilkie from 1944 to 1948 in the Legislative Assembly of Saskatchewan as a Co-operative Commonwealth Federation (CCF) member.

He was born in Iowa and, at the age of three, moved to a homestead in Leipzig, Saskatchewan with his parents. He was educated at Concordia College in Edmonton. Hansen attended the founding convention for the CCF in 1933 and later served on its provincial council. Also in 1933, he married Marie Baron. In 1943, he moved from his farm in Reford to the town of Wilkie. In 1944 he was elected to represent Wilkie in the first CCF government. Hansen was defeated by John Whitmore Horsman when he ran for reelection in 1948 and 1952. He died at the Wilkie Union Hospital at the age of 89.
