= Mark Docherty =

Mark Docherty may refer to:

- Mark Docherty (footballer)
- Mark Docherty (politician)
