= 2023 Regina Coronation Park provincial by-election =

Provincial by-election in Saskatchewan, Canada

August 10, 2023

District of Regina Coronation Park
- Turnout: 29.02%
	First party	Second party	Third party
	NDP	SP	PC
Candidate	Noor Burki	Riaz Ahmad	Olasehinde Ben Adebayo
Party	New Democratic	Saskatchewan	Progressive Conservative
Popular vote	2,039	1,131	222
Percentage	56.65%	31.43%	6.17%
Swing	▲12.53	▼17.44	▲2.36
MLA before election
Mark Docherty
Saskatchewan
Elected MLA
Noor Burki
New Democratic

A by-election was held in the provincial riding of Regina Coronation Park in Saskatchewan on August 10, 2023, to elect a new member of the Legislative Assembly of Saskatchewan following the resignation of Saskatchewan Party MLA Mark Docherty.

It was held the same day as two others in the province; Lumsden-Morse and Regina Walsh Acres.

== Candidates ==
The list of candidates:

- Noor Burki: Saskatchewan New Democratic Party
- Kendra Anderson: Saskatchewan Green Party
- Riaz Ahmad: Saskatchewan Party
- Olasehinde Ben Adebay: Progressive Conservative Party of Saskatchewan
- Reid Hill: Saskatchewan Progress Party

== Results ==
Saskatchewan provincial by-election, 10 August 2023: Regina Coronation Park Resignation of Mark Docherty
Party	Candidate	Votes	%	±%
New Democratic	Noor Burki	2,039	56.65	+12.53
Saskatchewan	Riaz Ahmad	1,131	31.43	-17.44
Progressive Conservative	Olasehinde Ben Adebayo	222	6.17	+2.36
Green	Kendra Anderson	122	3.39	+0.19
Progress	Reid Hill	85	2.36	
Total valid votes		3,599	99.89	
Total rejected ballots		4	0.11	-0.75
Turnout		3,603	29.02	-18.62
Eligible voters		12,415		
New Democratic gain from Saskatchewan		Swing		+14.99
Source: Elections Saskatchewan

== 2020 result ==
2020 Saskatchewan general election: Regina Coronation Park
Party	Candidate	Votes	%	±%
Saskatchewan	Mark Docherty	2,913	48.87	+1.02
New Democratic	Noor Burki	2,630	44.12	-1.39
Progressive Conservative	David Coates	227	3.81	-
Green	Irene Browatzke	191	3.20	+1.57
Total valid votes		5,961	99.14	
Total rejected ballots		52	0.86	+0.55
Turnout		6,013	47.64	-4.47
Eligible voters		12,621		
Saskatchewan hold		Swing		+1.20
Source: Elections Saskatchewan

== See also ==
- List of Saskatchewan by-elections
