= Regina Coronation Park =

Provincial electoral district in Saskatchewan, Canada

Saskatchewan electoral district
- Coordinates: 50.483°N 104.620°W

Provincial electoral district
- Legislature: Legislative Assembly of Saskatchewan
MLA
Noor Burki
New Democratic
- District created: 1995
- First contested: 1995
- Last contested: 2024

Demographics
- Electors: 10,038
- Census division: Division No. 6
- Census subdivision: Regina

Regina Coronation Park is a provincial electoral district for the Legislative Assembly of Saskatchewan, Canada. Located in north-central Regina, this district includes the neighbourhoods of Coronation Park, Argyle Park, Cityview, Englewood, Highland Park and Churchill Downs.

== History ==
This district was created for the 1995 general election out of parts of Regina Albert North, Regina Rosemont and Regina Churchill Downs, as part of a major province-wide redistribution that saw the legislature reduced from 66 seats to 58 seats.

For the 2003 general election, the riding gained Highland Park and Churchill Downs from Regina Northeast and lost Walsh Acres, Regent Park and Normanview to Regina Walsh Acres.

Before the next general election, the riding will gain Uplands from Regina Northeast and lose the portions of Coronation Park and Argyle Park west of Argyle Street to Regina Walsh Acres.

== Members of the Legislative Assembly ==
Legislature	Years	Member	Party
Regina Coronation Park
23rd	1995–1999	Kim Trew	New Democrat
24th	1999–2003	Kim Trew	New Democrat
25th	2003–2007	Kim Trew	New Democrat
26th	2007–2011	Kim Trew	New Democrat
27th	2011–2016	Mark Docherty	Saskatchewan Party
28th	2016–2020	Mark Docherty	Saskatchewan Party
29th	2020–2023	Mark Docherty	Saskatchewan Party
29th	2023–2024	Noor Burki	New Democrat
30th	2024-present	Noor Burki	New Democrat

== Election results ==
2024 Saskatchewan general election
** Preliminary results — Not yet official **
Party	Candidate	Votes	%	±%
New Democratic	Noor Burki	3,663	51.98	+7.9
Saskatchewan	Riaz Ahmad	2,710	38.46	-10.5
Progressive Conservative	Olasehinde Ben Adebayo	409	5.80	+1.7
Green	Maria Krznar	265	3.76	+1.3
Total valid votes		7,047	99.77	
Total rejected ballots		31	0.44	
Turnout		7,078		
Eligible voters		–		
Source: Elections Saskatchewan
New Democratic notional gain from Saskatchewan		Swing		+9.2

2020 provincial election redistributed results
Party	%
Saskatchewan	49.0
New Democratic	44.1
Progressive Conservative	4.1
Green	2.5
Liberal	0.3

Saskatchewan provincial by-election, 10 August 2023 Resignation of Mark Docherty
** Preliminary results — Not yet official **
Party	Candidate	Votes	%	±%
New Democratic	Noor Burki	2,039	56.65	+12.53
Saskatchewan	Riaz Ahmad	1,131	31.43	-17.44
Progressive Conservative	Olasehinde Ben Adebayo	222	6.17	+2.36
Green	Kendra Anderson	122	3.39	+0.19
Progress	Reid Hill	85	2.36	
Total valid votes		3,599	99.89	
Total rejected ballots		4	0.11	-0.75
Turnout		3,603	29.02	-18.62
Eligible voters		12,415		
New Democratic gain from Saskatchewan		Swing		+14.99
Source: Elections Saskatchewan

2020 Saskatchewan general election
Party	Candidate	Votes	%	±%
Saskatchewan	Mark Docherty	2,913	48.87	+1.02
New Democratic	Noor Burki	2,630	44.12	-1.39
Progressive Conservative	David Coates	227	3.81	-
Green	Irene Browatzke	191	3.20	+1.57
Total valid votes		5,961	99.14	
Total rejected ballots		52	0.86	+0.55
Turnout		6,013	47.64	-4.47
Eligible voters		12,621		
Saskatchewan hold		Swing		+1.20
Source: Elections Saskatchewan

2016 Saskatchewan general election
Party	Candidate	Votes	%	±%
Saskatchewan	Mark Docherty	3,008	47.84	-5.75
New Democratic	Ted Jaleta	2,861	45.51	+1.47
Liberal	Tara Jijian	245	3.90	-
Green	Melvin Pylypchuk	103	1.64	-0.73
Independent	Douglas Hudgin	70	1.11	*
Total valid votes		6,287	99.68	
Total rejected ballots		20	0.32	-0.00
Turnout		6,307	52.12	-10.43
Eligible voters		12,102		
Saskatchewan hold		Swing		-3.61
Source: Elections Saskatchewan

2011 Saskatchewan general election
Party	Candidate	Votes	%	±%
Saskatchewan	Mark Docherty	3,354	53.30	+21.83
New Democratic	Jaime Garcia	2,756	44.04	-11.89
Green	Helmi Scott	148	2.37	+0.78
Total valid votes		6,258	99.68	
Total rejected ballots		20	0.32	+0.14
Turnout		6,278	62.54	-10.29
Eligible voters		10,038		
Saskatchewan gain from New Democratic		Swing		+16.86

2007 Saskatchewan general election
Party	Candidate	Votes	%	±%
New Democratic	Kim Trew	4,122	55.93	-6.92
Saskatchewan	Terrill Young	2,341	31.76	+8.19
Liberal	Marlin Belt	669	9.08	-2.94
Marijuana	Tom Shapiro	121	1.64	*
Green	Allan Kirk	117	1.59	+0.70
Total valid votes		7,370	99.82	
Total rejected ballots		13	0.18	+0.01
Turnout		7,383	72.83	+5.41
Eligible voters		10,137		
New Democratic hold		Swing		-7.55

2003 Saskatchewan general election
Party	Candidate	Votes	%	±%
New Democratic	Kim Trew	4,439	62.85	+10.66
Saskatchewan	Robert Taylor	1,665	23.57	-0.44
Liberal	Edgar Sauer	849	12.02	-10.00
New Green	Kim Weiss	63	0.89	*
Progressive Conservative	Kenneth R. Johnson	47	0.67	-1.11
Total valid votes		7,063	99.83	
Total rejected ballots		12	0.17	-0.66
Turnout		7,075	67.43	+5.41
Eligible voters		10,493		
New Democratic hold		Swing		+5.55

1999 Saskatchewan general election
Party	Candidate	Votes	%	±%
New Democratic	Kim Trew	3,297	52.19	-11.33
Saskatchewan	Lyle Hewitt	1,517	24.01	*
Liberal	Kathy Hill	1,391	22.02	-7.69
Progressive Conservative	Ian Kimball	112	1.77	-5.00
Total valid votes		6,317	99.17	
Total rejected ballots		53	0.83	+0.24
Turnout		6,370	62.01	+0.04
Eligible voters		10,272		
New Democratic hold		Swing		-17.67

1995 Saskatchewan general election
Party	Candidate	Votes	%
New Democratic	Kim Trew	4,240	63.52
Liberal	Clyde Myhill	1,983	29.71
Progressive Conservative	Roy Gaebel	452	6.77
Total valid votes		6,675	99.40
Total rejected ballots		40	0.60
Turnout		6,715	61.98
Eligible voters		10,835	

== See also ==
- List of Saskatchewan provincial electoral districts
- List of Saskatchewan general elections
- Canadian provincial electoral districts
