= Regina Lakeview =

Provincial electoral district in Saskatchewan, Canada

Saskatchewan electoral district
- Coordinates: 50.431°N 104.619°W

Provincial electoral district
- Legislature: Legislative Assembly of Saskatchewan
MLA
Carla Beck
New Democratic
- First contested: 1971
- Last contested: 2024
- Communities: Regina

Regina Lakeview is a provincial electoral district for the Legislative Assembly of Saskatchewan, Canada.

== Members of the Legislative Assembly ==
Legislature	Years	Member	Party
17th	1971–1975	Don McPherson	Liberal
18th	1975–1978	Ted Malone	Liberal
19th	1978–1982	Doug McArthur	New Democrat
20th	1982–1986	Tim Embury	Progressive Conservative
21st	1986–1991	Louise Simard	New Democrat
Riding dissolved into Regina Hillsdale and Regina Lake Centre
Riding re-created from Regina Hillsdale, Regina Albert South and Regina Lake Centre
23rd	1995–1999	John Nilson	New Democrat
24th	1999–2003	John Nilson	New Democrat
25th	2003–2007	John Nilson	New Democrat
26th	2007–2011	John Nilson	New Democrat
27th	2011–2016	John Nilson	New Democrat
28th	2016–2020	Carla Beck	New Democrat
29th	2020–2024	Carla Beck	New Democrat
30th	2024–present	Carla Beck	New Democrat

== Election results ==
2020 Saskatchewan general election
Party	Candidate	Votes	%	±%
New Democratic	Carla Beck	4,739	65.48	+9.00
Saskatchewan	Megan Patterson	2,194	30.31	-4.88
Green	Michael Wright	202	2.79	-0.46
Liberal	Bruno Sahut	103	1.42	-3.64
Total valid votes		7,238	99.23	
Total rejected ballots		56	0.77	–
Turnout		7,294	59.49	–
Eligible voters		12,260		
New Democratic hold		Swing		–
Source: Elections Saskatchewan

2016 Saskatchewan general election
Party	Candidate	Votes	%	±%
New Democratic	Carla Beck	4,358	56.48	+8.10
Saskatchewan	Dan Cooper	2,715	35.19	-11.37
Liberal	Stewart Kerr	391	5.06	-
Green	Larry Neufeld	251	3.25	-1.81
Total valid votes		–	100.0	
Eligible voters		–		
New Democratic hold		Swing		–
Source: Elections Saskatchewan

2011 Saskatchewan general election
Party	Candidate	Votes	%	±%
NDP	John Nilson	3,908	48.37	+0.76
Saskatchewan	Bob Hawkins	3,762	46.56	+14.16
Green	Mike Wright	410	5.06	+0.70
Total			100.00	

2007 Saskatchewan general election
Party	Candidate	Votes	%	±%
NDP	John Nilson	4,323	47.67	-9.29
Saskatchewan	Raynelle Wilson	2,932	32.33	+12.08
Liberal	Matt Sirois	1,418	15.64	-5.73
Green	Robert Cosbey	395	4.36	+2.98
Total		9,068	100.00	

2003 Saskatchewan general election
Party	Candidate	Votes	%	±%
NDP	John Nilson	4,988	56.91	+7.60
Liberal	Dave Brundige	1,875	21.39	-4.08
Saskatchewan	Michelle Hunter	1,781	20.32	-0.09
Green	Brian Rands	121	1.38	–
Total		8,976	100.00	

1999 Saskatchewan general election
Party	Candidate	Votes	%	±%
NDP	John Nilson	4,207	49.31	-5.38
Liberal	Karen Pedersen	2.173	25.47	-12.71
Saskatchewan	Randall Edge	1,741	20.41	–
Independent	Wayne Gilmer	295	3.46	–
Progressive Conservative	Brad Johnson	116	1.36	-5.77
Total		8,532	100.00	

1995 Saskatchewan general election
Party	Candidate	Votes	%	±%
NDP	John Nilson	4,807	54.69	–
Liberal	Karen Pedersen	3.356	38.18	–
Progressive Conservative	Brad Johnson	627	7.13	–
Total		8,976	100.00	

1986 Saskatchewan general election
Party	Candidate	Votes	%	±%
NDP	Louise Simard	4,185	47.51%	+5.26
Progressive Conservative	Tim Embury	2,989	33.94%	-18.06
Liberal	June Blau	1,634	18.55%	+12.78
Total		8,808	100.00%	

1982 Saskatchewan general election
Party	Candidate	Votes	%	±%
Progressive Conservative	Tim Embury	4,688	52.00%	+29.25
NDP	Doug McArthur	3,808	42.24%	-3,04
Liberal	Dolores Honour	520	5.77%	-26.20
Total		9,016	100.00%	

1978 Saskatchewan general election
Party	Candidate	Votes	%	±%
NDP	Doug McArthur	3,351	45.28%	+11.66
Liberal	Philip M. Desjardine	2,366	31.97%	-11.60
Progressive Conservative	Ian McPherson	1,684	22.75%	-0.07
Total		7,401	100.00%	

1975 Saskatchewan general election
Party	Candidate	Votes	%	±%
Liberal	Ted Malone	3,374	43.57%	-10.61
NDP	Henri Saucier	2,603	33.61%	-12.21
Prog. Conservative	Reg Watts	1,767	22.82%	-
Total		7,744	100.00%	

1971 Saskatchewan general election
Party	Candidate	Votes	%	±%
Liberal	Don McPherson	5,170	54.18%	
NDP	Walter H. Coates	4,373	45.82%	
Total		9,543	100.00%	

== See also ==
- List of Saskatchewan provincial electoral districts
- List of Saskatchewan general elections
- Canadian provincial electoral districts
