= Donald Mighton McPherson =

Canadian politician

Don McPherson

MLA for Regina Lakeview
- In office June 23, 1971 – September 14, 1973
- Preceded by: Himself (as MLA for Regina South West)
- Succeeded by: Ted Malone

MLA for Regina South West
- In office October 11, 1967 – June 23, 1971
- Preceded by: New District
- Succeeded by: Himself (as MLA for Regina Lakeview)

Personal details
- Born: July 17, 1937 (age 88) Regina, Saskatchewan
- Party: Liberal

Donald Mighton McPherson (November 26, 1918 – September 14, 1973) was a Canadian professional sports executive, businessman, farmer and political figure in Saskatchewan. He represented Regina South West from 1967 to 1971 and Regina Lakeview from 1971 to 1973 in the Legislative Assembly of Saskatchewan as a Liberal.

== Early life ==
He was born in Regina, Saskatchewan, and was educated there, going on to study agriculture at the University of Manitoba. He served with The Fort Garry Horse and the 10th Canadian Armoured Regiment during World War II and received the Croix de Guerre with Étoile de Vermeil (Silver Star).

== Career ==
In 1949, he became a director for the Saskatchewan Roughriders of the Canadian Football League (CFL). From 1956 to 1957, McPherson served as the club's president and he continued to serve on the team's management committee until his death. He was also president of the CFL in 1959, president of the Canadian Rugby Union in 1963 and president of the Western Football Conference in 1965. McPherson chaired a committee to reorganize the management of the BC Lions in 1962, receiving a lifetime membership in that football club for his efforts.

McPherson was president of a number of companies, including McPherson and Thom Ltd. of Regina, McPherson and Thom Ltd. of Alberta, Western Welding of Saskatoon and Regina Tire Mart. He also served as a director for several companies, including Carling Breweries, the Bank of Western Canada and Prairie Metal Products Ltd. In 1966, he was named Saskatchewan Salesman of the Year by the Regina Sales and Marketing Club.

A farm owner, McPherson raised purebred Aberdeen Angus cattle.

From 1953 to 1958, he was a member of Regina city council. McPherson was a member of the board of governors for the Regina General Hospital. He helped establish the United Way in Regina and served as president of the city's United Appeal in 1961.

McPherson served as Opposition whip in the Saskatchewan assembly. He died in office at the age of 54.

McPherson was named to the Canadian Football Hall of Fame as a builder in 1983 and to the Saskatchewan Roughriders Plaza of Honor in 1988.
