= Tim Embury =

Canadian politician

Member of the Saskatchewan Legislative Assembly for Regina Lakeview
- In office October 18, 1978 – April 1982
- Preceded by: Douglas Francis McArthur
- Succeeded by: Louise Simard

Personal details
- Born: January 20, 1947 (age 79) Regina, Saskatchewan
- Party: Saskatchewan Progressive Conservative Party
- Profession: Loan officer
- Portfolio: Urban Affairs, the Environment

Timothy Burke Embury (born January 20, 1947) is a former bank employee and political figure in Saskatchewan, Canada. He represented Regina Lakeview from 1982 to 1986 as a Progressive Conservative.

He was born in Regina, Saskatchewan, the son of Alan Embury. Before entering provincial politics, Embury was a loans officer for the Canadian Imperial Bank of Commerce in Regina and served on Regina city council from 1977 to 1982.

He served in the Saskatchewan cabinet as Minister of Urban Affairs and as Minister of the Environment. Embury was defeated by Louise Simard when he ran for reelection to the assembly in 1986.

After leaving provincial politics, he established a management consulting firm in Regina and then later moved to Calgary, Alberta where he worked for the Osborne Group.
