= Noor Burki =

Canadian politician from Saskatchewan

Noor Burki MLA

Member of the Legislative Assembly of Saskatchewan for Regina Coronation Park
- Incumbent
- Assumed office August 10, 2023
- Preceded by: Mark Docherty

Shadow Minister of immigration
- Incumbent
- Assumed office November 13, 2024
- Leader: Carla Beck

Personal details
- Born: Pakistan
- Party: Saskatchewan New Democratic Party

Noor Burki is a Canadian politician from the Saskatchewan New Democratic Party, who was elected to the Legislative Assembly of Saskatchewan in the 2023 Regina Coronation Park provincial by-election.

== Career ==
Burki was born in Pakistan and immigrated to Canada in 2003. Before entering politics, he owned a driving school and worked as a teacher.

Burki first entered politics in the 2020 Saskatchewan provincial election, where he was the candidate of the Saskatchewan New Democratic Party (NDP) in the riding of Regina Coronation Park. He received 44.12% of the vote, placing second behind incumbent Mark Docherty. When Docherty resigned from the Legislative Assembly of Saskatchewan on February 10, 2023, Burki was the NDP candidate in the ensuing by-election, held on August 10, 2023. This time he was elected, receiving 56.65% of the vote and defeating Saskatchewan Party candidate Riaz Ahmad. The two would rematch in the 2024 Saskatchewan provincial election, where Burki was subsequently re-elected.

As of June 22, 2024, he serves as the Official Opposition critic for Immigration. In this role, he has spoken out about racism faced by healthcare workers and criticized the decision of the provincial government to suspend an immigration program designed to attract skilled workers to Saskatchewan.

== Electoral record ==
2024 Saskatchewan general election: Regina Coronation Park
Party	Candidate	Votes	%	±%
New Democratic	Noor Burki	3,926	52.73	
Saskatchewan	Riaz Ahmad	2,834	38.06	
Progressive Conservative	Olasehinde Ben Adebayo	414	5.56	
Green	Maria Krznar	272	3.65	
Total valid votes		7,446	99.15	
Total rejected ballots		64	0.85	
Turnout		7,510		
Eligible voters		–		
Source: Elections Saskatchewan
New Democratic notional gain		Swing		

Saskatchewan provincial by-election, 10 August 2023: Regina Coronation Park Resignation of Mark Docherty
Party	Candidate	Votes	%	±%
New Democratic	Noor Burki	2,039	56.65	+12.53
Saskatchewan	Riaz Ahmad	1,131	31.43	-17.44
Progressive Conservative	Olasehinde Ben Adebayo	222	6.17	+2.36
Green	Kendra Anderson	122	3.39	+0.19
Progress	Reid Hill	85	2.36	
Total valid votes		3,599	99.89	
Total rejected ballots		4	0.11	-0.75
Turnout		3,603	29.02	-18.62
Eligible voters		12,415		
New Democratic gain from Saskatchewan		Swing		+14.99
Source: Elections Saskatchewan

2020 Saskatchewan general election: Regina Coronation Park
Party	Candidate	Votes	%	±%
Saskatchewan	Mark Docherty	2,913	48.87	+1.02
New Democratic	Noor Burki	2,630	44.12	-1.39
Progressive Conservative	David Coates	227	3.81	-
Green	Irene Browatzke	191	3.20	+1.57
Total valid votes		5,961	99.14	
Total rejected ballots		52	0.86	+0.55
Turnout		6,013	47.64	-4.47
Eligible voters		12,621		
Saskatchewan hold		Swing		+1.20
Source: Elections Saskatchewan
