= Biggar (former provincial electoral district) =

Former provincial electoral district in Saskatchewan, Canada

Coordinates: 52°05′N 107°35′W

Biggar is a former provincial electoral division for the Legislative Assembly of the province of Saskatchewan, Canada, centred on the town of Biggar. This district was created before the 3rd Saskatchewan general election in 1912. The riding was dissolved and combined with the Rosetown district to form Rosetown-Biggar before the 23rd Saskatchewan general election in 1995. It was the constituency of Premier Woodrow S. Lloyd.

It is now part of the Biggar-Sask Valley constituency.

== Members of the Legislative Assembly ==
#	MLA	Served	Party
1.	Charles Henry Cawthorpe	1912–1917	Liberal
2.	George Hamilton Harris	1917–1921	Liberal
3.	John Meikle	1921–1925	Progressive
4.	Robert Pelham Hassard	1925–1929	Liberal
5.	William Willoughby Miller	1929–1934	Conservative
6.	Robert Pelham Hassard	1934–1938	Liberal
7.	John Allan Young	1938–1944	CCF
8.	Woodrow S. Lloyd	1944–1971	CCF-NDP
9.	Elwood L. Cowley	1971–1982	New Democrat
10.	Harry Baker	1982–1991	Progressive Conservative
11.	Grant Whitmore	1991–1995	New Democrat

== Election results ==
1912 Saskatchewan general election: Biggar electoral district
Party	Candidate	Votes	%	±%
Liberal	Charles Henry Cawthorpe	754	57.73%	–
Conservative	Lachlan MacDonald	552	42.27%	–
Total		1,306	100.00%	

1917 Saskatchewan general election: Biggar electoral district
Party	Candidate	Votes	%	±%
Liberal	George Hamilton Harris	1,989	57.01%	-0.72
Conservative	William George Dunbar	1,500	42.99%	+0.72
Total		3,489	100.00%	

1921 Saskatchewan general election: Biggar electoral district
Party	Candidate	Votes	%	±%
Progressive	John Meikle	2,293	60.18%	–
Liberal	Lorne V. Locker	1,517	39.82%	-17.19
Total		3,810	100.00%	

1925 Saskatchewan general election: Biggar electoral district
Party	Candidate	Votes	%	±%
Liberal	Robert Pelham Hassard	1,758	52.98%	+13.16
Progressive	John Meikle	1,560	47.02%	-13.16
Total		3,318	100.00%	

1929 Saskatchewan general election: Biggar electoral district
Party	Candidate	Votes	%	±%
Conservative	William Willoughby Miller	2,733	51.67%	-
Liberal	Robert Pelham Hassard	2,014	38.08%	-14.90
Progressive	George Robert Bickerton	542	10.25%	-36.77
Total		5,289	100.00%	

1934 Saskatchewan general election: Biggar electoral district
Party	Candidate	Votes	%	±%
Liberal	Robert Pelham Hassard	2,287	40.64%	+2.56
Farmer-Labour	Warren Hart	2,044	36.33%	–
Conservative	William Willoughby Miller	1,296	23.03%	-28.64
Total		5,627	100.00%	

1938 Saskatchewan general election: Biggar electoral district
Party	Candidate	Votes	%	±%
CCF	John Allan Young	3,341	45.28%	+8.95
Liberal	Robert Pelham Hassard	3,196	43.32%	+2.68
Social Credit	Henry A. Gardner	841	11.40%	–
Total		7,378	100.00%	

1944 Saskatchewan general election: Biggar electoral district
Party	Candidate	Votes	%	±%
CCF	Woodrow S. Lloyd	3,633	62.76%	+17.48
Liberal	Frank Freeman	2,156	37.24%	-6.08
Total		5,789	100.00%	

1948 Saskatchewan general election: Biggar electoral district
Party	Candidate	Votes	%	±%
CCF	Woodrow S. Lloyd	3,695	55.30%	-7.46
Liberal	Andrew S. Shaw	2,987	44.70%	+7.46
Total		6,682	100.00%	

1952 Saskatchewan general election: Biggar electoral district
Party	Candidate	Votes	%	±%
CCF	Woodrow S. Lloyd	3,811	64.18%	+8.88
Liberal	Andrew S. Shaw	2,127	35.82%	-8.88
Total		5,938	100.00%	

1956 Saskatchewan general election: Biggar electoral district
Party	Candidate	Votes	%	±%
CCF	Woodrow S. Lloyd	3,182	56.10%	-8.08
Liberal	Frank Freeman	1,720	30.32%	-5.50
Social Credit	Edward W. Maybuck	770	13.58%	-
Total		5,672	100.00%	

1960 Saskatchewan general election: Biggar electoral district
Party	Candidate	Votes	%	±%
CCF	Woodrow S. Lloyd	3,049	51.66%	-4.44
Liberal	Andrew D. Hutchison	1,932	32.74%	+2.42
Prog. Conservative	Jack Lehmond	663	11.23%	-
Social Credit	Henry Neufeld	258	4.37%	-9.21
Total		5,902	100.00%	

1964 Saskatchewan general election: Biggar electoral district
Party	Candidate	Votes	%	±%
CCF	Woodrow S. Lloyd	2,875	48.02%	-3.64
Liberal	Benson M. Blacklock	1,992	33.27%	+0.53
Prog. Conservative	George Loucks	1,120	18.71%	+7.48
Total		5,987	100.00%	

1967 Saskatchewan general election: Biggar electoral district
Party	Candidate	Votes	%	±%
NDP	Woodrow S. Lloyd	2,916	50.09%	+2.07
Liberal	Elmer McNiven	1,571	26.99%	-6.28
Prog. Conservative	Peter Wiebe	1,334	22.92%	+4.21
Total		5,821	100.00%	

1971 Saskatchewan general election: Biggar electoral district
Party	Candidate	Votes	%	±%
NDP	Elwood L. Cowley	3,599	61.96%	+11.87
Liberal	Jim Hill	2,210	38.04%	+11.05
Total		5,809	100.00%	

1975 Saskatchewan general election: Biggar electoral district
Party	Candidate	Votes	%	±%
NDP	Elwood L. Cowley	3,223	48.47%	-13.49
Prog. Conservative	Ralph Young	1,906	28.67%	-
Liberal	Arthur Meister	1,520	22.86%	-15.18
Total		6,649	100.00%	

1978 Saskatchewan general election: Biggar electoral district
Party	Candidate	Votes	%	±%
NDP	Elwood L. Cowley	4,787	55.61%	+7.14
Prog. Conservative	Roy Norris	3,270	37.98%	+9.31
Liberal	Lynn Tokle	552	6.41%	-16.45
Total		8,609	100.00%	

1982 Saskatchewan general election: Biggar electoral district
Party	Candidate	Votes	%	±%
Progressive Conservative	Harry Baker	4,437	55.63%	+17.65
NDP	Elwood L. Cowley	3,070	38.50%	-17.11
Western Canada Concept	Roland F. Chouinard	327	4.10%	-
Liberal	Neil Vander Nagel	141	1.77%	-4.64
Total		7,975	100.00%	

1986 Saskatchewan general election: Biggar electoral district
Party	Candidate	Votes	%	±%
Progressive Conservative	Harry Baker	3,882	50.26%	-5.37
NDP	Pat Trask	3,449	44.65%	+6.15
Liberal	Sharon Hamilton	393	5.09%	+3.32
Total		7,724	100.00%	

1991 Saskatchewan general election: Biggar electoral district
Party	Candidate	Votes	%	±%
NDP	Grant Whitmore	3,710	47.62%	+2.97
Prog. Conservative	Harry Baker	2,307	29.62%	-20.64
Liberal	Larry Toner	1,708	21.93%	+16.84
Independent	Donald W. Kavanagh	65	0.83%	-
Total		7,790	100.00%	

== See also ==
- List of Saskatchewan provincial electoral districts
- List of Saskatchewan general elections
- Canadian provincial electoral districts
