= Kenneth Roy MacLeod =

Canadian politician

Kenneth Roy MacLeod (September 10, 1927 – March 30, 2011) was a lawyer, judge and political figure in Saskatchewan. He represented Regina Albert Park from 1971 to 1975 in the Legislative Assembly of Saskatchewan as a Liberal.

He was born in Wadena, Saskatchewan and was educated in Tisdale and at the University of Saskatchewan, where he received a law degree. He practised law in Saskatoon and then Regina, where he became a partner in Balfour, MacLeod, McDonald, Moss, Laschuk and Kyle. In 1968, MacLeod ran unsuccessfully as a Liberal in the federal Regina East riding. In 1973, he was named Queen's Counsel. MacLeod served as a judge in the Court of Queen's Bench for Saskatchewan from 1975 to 2002.

MacLeod was president and founder of the Kiwanis National Little League and the Saskatchewan Little League District One. A baseball field in Regina was named the Honourable Ken MacLeod Field in his honour. MacLeod was named to the Regina Sports Hall of Fame in 2003.
