= Edward Cyril Malone =

Canadian politician

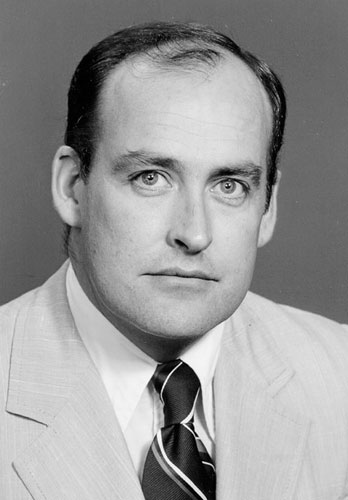
- Ted Malone

Leader of the Opposition (Saskatchewan)
- In office 1976–1978
- Preceded by: David Steuart
- Succeeded by: Dick Collver

MLA for Regina Lakeview
- In office 1973–1978
- Preceded by: Don McPherson
- Succeeded by: Doug McArthur

Personal details
- Born: July 17, 1937 (age 88) Regina, Saskatchewan
- Party: Liberal

Edward Cyril "Ted" Malone (born July 17, 1937) is a retired Saskatchewan lawyer, politician and judge. He represented Regina Lakeview in the Legislative Assembly of Saskatchewan from 1973 to 1978 and was leader of the Liberal Party of Saskatchewan from 1976 to 1981.

He was born in Regina, Saskatchewan in 1937, the son of Justin Cyril Malone and Marion Grassick who was the daughter of James Grassick, a Regina MLA and mayor. Malone studied law at the University of Saskatchewan and went on to work for the federal and provincial Liberal parties. He was elected as Liberal Party leader in 1976 after a bitter campaign against Anthony Merchant that divided and weakened the party. The Liberals failed to elect any members in the 1978 provincial election.

Malone was named to the Court of Queen's Bench at Regina in 1981.
