= Linda Clifford (politician) =

Canadian politician

MLA for Wilkie
- In office 1975–1978
- Preceded by: Cliff McIsaac
- Succeeded by: Jim Garner

Personal details
- Born: 1949 (age 76–77)
- Party: Saskatchewan Liberal Party

Linda Beverly Clifford is a former Canadian politician who served in the Legislative Assembly of Saskatchewan from 1975 to 1978. She represented the electoral district of Wilkie as a member of the Saskatchewan Liberal Party caucus.

She later worked on Parliament Hill as an aide to Liberal Party of Canada members of Parliament.
