= Lyle Stewart =

Canadian politician (1951–2024)

The Honourable Lyle Stewart ECS

Member of the Saskatchewan Legislative Assembly for Lumsden-Morse Thunder Creek (1999-2016)
- In office September 16, 1999 – March 10, 2023
- Preceded by: Gerard Aldridge
- Succeeded by: Blaine McLeod

Personal details
- Born: June 4, 1951 Regina, Saskatchewan, Canada
- Died: July 30, 2024 (aged 73) Moose Jaw, Saskatchewan, Canada
- Party: Saskatchewan Party
- Occupation: Farmer, rancher

Lyle Eldon Stewart (June 4, 1951 – July 30, 2024) was a Canadian provincial politician. A member of the Saskatchewan Party, he served six terms in the Legislative Assembly of Saskatchewan.

== Life and career ==
Stewart was born on June 4, 1951. He first became involved in politics in the 1970s. Stewart served as the executive assistant to Colin Thatcher, who served as the MLA for Thunder Creek. Thatcher was a former Liberal who had crossed the floor to the Progressive Conservatives prior to that party winning power in the 1982 election. After Thatcher resigned in disgrace upon receiving a life sentence for the 1983 murder of his ex-wife, Stewart twice sought the PC nomination, first for the ensuing by-election in 1985 and again for the 1986 general election. On both occasions, he was defeated by Rick Swenson.

After the riding switched back to the Liberals following the 1995 election, Stewart joined the new Saskatchewan Party which had essentially replaced the scandal-ridden PC's as the largest centre-right party in the province. This time, he defeated Swenson for the nomination. Stewart then unseated incumbent Liberal Gerard Aldridge in the 1999 general election. Stewart represented the constituency of Thunder Creek until its abolition in 2016. Stewart was subsequently elected in Lumsden-Morse, a new electoral district encompassing most of the former Thunder Creek constituency.

Stewart had been the Minister of Agriculture and the Minister Responsible for Saskatchewan Crop Insurance Corporation since May 25, 2012, a role he maintained following the August 23, 2016 cabinet shuffle. He had been a member of the Executive Council of Saskatchewan since the Saskatchewan Party won its first majority government in 2007, previously serving as the Minister for Enterprise and Innovation. On August 9, 2018, he announced he was resigning from Cabinet due to health concerns. In late 2020 Stewart was named Legislative Secretary to the Premier responsible for Provincial Autonomy and also the role of Provincial secretary.

Stewart caused controversy in October 2022 when his mentor Colin Thatcher attended the Speech from the Throne. Thatcher was on parole for the murder of his wife, JoAnn Wilson. Stewart later acknowledged in a statement that he had invited Thatcher, whom he called a "friend", and admitted that the invitation was an "error in judgment". He was removed from his role as legislative secretary by Saskatchewan Premier Scott Moe but permitted to remain as a party caucus member.

On March 6, 2023, Stewart announced his resignation from the legislative assembly effective March 10, citing health reasons.

He died from complications of cancer in Moose Jaw, Saskatchewan, on July 30, 2024, at the age of 73.

== Electoral record ==
2007 Saskatchewan general election: Thunder Creek
| Party | Candidate | Votes | % | ±% |
|---|---|---|---|---|
| Saskatchewan | Lyle Stewart | 5,558 | 64.45% | +10.92 |
| New Democratic | Larry Hall | 1,997 | 23.16% | -7.65 |
| Liberal | Rod Haugerud | 590 | 6.84% | -6.84 |
| Progressive Conservative | Richard Swenson | 295 | 3.42% | - |
| Green | Russ Rudd | 184 | 2.13% | - |
| Total | | 8,624 | 100.00% | |

2003 Saskatchewan general election: Thunder Creek
| Party | Candidate | Votes | % | ±% |
|---|---|---|---|---|
| Saskatchewan | Lyle Stewart | 4,450 | 53.50% | +0.58 |
| New Democratic | Larry Hall | 2,572 | 30.92% | +10.85 |
| Liberal | Rod Haugerud | 1,132 | 13.61% | −13.41 |
| Western Independence | Harold Stephan | 164 | 1.97% | – |
| Total | | 8,318 | 100.00% | |

1999 Saskatchewan general election: Thunder Creek
| Party | Candidate | Votes | % | ±% |
|---|---|---|---|---|
| Saskatchewan | Lyle Stewart | 3,969 | 52.95% | - |
| Liberal | Gerard Aldridge | 2,031 | 27.09% | -10.40 |
| New Democratic | Ivan Costley | 1,496 | 19.96% | -10.90 |
| Total | | 7,496 | 100.00% | |

== Cabinet positions ==
Saskatchewan provincial government of Scott Moe
Cabinet posts (2)
| Predecessor | Office | Successor |
|---|---|---|
| Todd Goudy | Provincial Secretary of Saskatchewan; November 9, 2020 – May 31, 2022 | Tim McLeod |
| con'd from Wall Ministry | Minister of Agriculture; February 2, 2018 – August 15, 2018 | Dave Marit |
Saskatchewan provincial government of Brad Wall
Cabinet posts (2)
| Predecessor | Office | Successor |
| Bob Bjornerud | Minister of Agriculture; May 25, 2012 – February 2, 2018 | con'd into Moe Ministry |
| Ministry Established | Minister of Enterprise and Innovation; November 21, 2007 – May 29, 2009 | Ken Cheveldayoff |
