= Assiniboia-Gravelbourg =

Former provincial electoral district in Saskatchewan, Canada

Coordinates: 49.744°N 106.273°W

Assiniboia-Gravelbourg was a provincial electoral district for the Legislative Assembly of Saskatchewan, Canada. This constituency was created from the ridings of Gravelbourg and Assiniboia-Bengough before the 1975 Saskatchewan general election. The constituency was bisected into both the Thunder Creek and Wood River ridings before the 1995 Saskatchewan general election.

== Member of the Legislative Assembly ==
#	MLA	Served	Party
1.	Roy Edgar Nelson	1975–1978	Liberal
2.	Allen Willard Engel	1978–1986	New Democratic Party
3.	Ralph Goodale	1986–1988	Liberal
4.	John Thomas Wolfe	1988–1991	Progressive Conservative
5.	Lewis Draper	1991–1995	New Democratic Party

== Election results ==
Saskatchewan General Election 1975: Assiniboia-Gravelbourg
Party	Candidate	Votes	%	±%
Liberal	Roy Edgar Nelson	3,400	42.88	-
New Democratic	Allen Willard Engel	3,012	37.98	-
PC	Connie McLeod	1,517	19.13	-
Total		7,929	100.00	

Saskatchewan General Election 1978: Assiniboia-Gravelbourg
Party	Candidate	Votes	%	±%
New Democratic	Allen Willard Engel	3,126	38.50	+0.51
Liberal	Roy Edgar Nelson	2,662	32.78	-10.09
PC	Wilf Lethbridge	2,331	28.71	+9.57
Total		8,119	100.00	

Saskatchewan General Election 1982: Assiniboia-Gravelbourg
Party	Candidate	Votes	%	±%
New Democratic	Allen Willard Engel	2,875	33.69	-4.80
Liberal	Ralph Edward Goodale	2,760	32.34	-0.43
PC	Rene Archambault	2,438	28.57	-0.13
Western Canada Concept	Hugh Clarke	459	5.37	-
Total		8,532		

Saskatchewan General Election 1986: Assiniboia-Gravelbourg
Party	Candidate	Votes	%	±%
Liberal	Ralph Edward Goodale	3,246	41.01	+8.66
New Democratic	Allen Willard Engel	2,395	30.26	-3.43
PC	Bill Fancourt	2,273	28.72	+0.14
Total		7,914	100.00	

Assiniboia-Gravelbourg By-election, December 15, 1988
Party	Candidate	Votes	%	±%
PC	John Thomas Wolfe	3,164	44.31	+15.59
New Democratic	Allen Willard Engel	3,009	42.14	+11.88
Liberal	Daryl Beatty	966	13.53	-27.48
Total		7,139	100.00	

Saskatchewan General Election 1991: Assiniboia-Gravelbourg
Party	Candidate	Votes	%	±%
New Democratic	Lewis Draper	2,647	35.87	-6.27
PC	John Thomas Wolfe	2,583	35.00	-9.31
Liberal	Tim Connors	2,148	29.11	+15.58
Total		7,378	100.00	

== See also ==
- List of Saskatchewan provincial electoral districts
- List of Saskatchewan general elections
- Canadian provincial electoral districts
