= Frank Lindsay Bastedo =

Canadian politician

The Honourable Frank Lindsay Bastedo QC UE

11th Lieutenant Governor of Saskatchewan
- In office February 3, 1958 – March 1, 1963
- Monarch: Elizabeth II
- Governors General: Vincent Massey; Georges Vanier
- Premier: Tommy Douglas; Woodrow Lloyd
- Preceded by: William John Patterson
- Succeeded by: Robert Hanbidge

Personal details
- Born: September 10, 1886 Bracebridge, Ontario
- Died: February 15, 1973 (aged 86) Victoria, British Columbia, Canada
- Party: Conservative
- Education: University of Toronto
- Profession: Lawyer

Frank Lindsay Bastedo QC UE (September 10, 1886 – February 15, 1973), was a Canadian lawyer who served as the 11th lieutenant governor of Saskatchewan, from 1958 to 1963. He is notable for being the last Canadian vice-regal representatives to reserve royal assent for a legislative bill, referring it to the federal government for decision.

He was a descendant of Peter McMicking (1731–1823), a United Empire Loyalist, and also with Spanish ancestral origins. Bastedo earned his law degree from the University of Toronto in 1909. He moved to Regina two years later to join a law firm there. He was appointed King's Counsel in 1927.

A Conservative by party, he headed Regina's Conservative Association from 1921 to 1924 but did not seek the party's nomination for elected office.

Bastedo was appointed lieutenant-governor on the advice of Progressive Conservative Prime Minister John Diefenbaker in 1958.

The lieutenant-governor, like the Governor-General of Canada is a largely ceremonial position, however, as the Queen's representative he does have rarely used reserve powers to veto legislation. Bastedo employed the little-used power to reserve a bill (that is, withhold assent and send the bill to the Governor General of Canada who would grant assent only if the federal Cabinet agrees) proposed by Saskatchewan's Co-operative Commonwealth Federation government of Woodrow Lloyd in 1961. This was the first time a lieutenant-governor had reserved a bill for federal consideration since 1937, when Lieutenant-Governor of Alberta John C. Bowen reserved three bills proposed by the Social Credit government of William Aberhart as unconstitutional.

The measure in question, Bill 56, was entitled An Act to Provide for the Alteration of Certain Mineral Contracts. Bastedo issued a statement that "this is a very important bill affecting hundreds of mineral contracts. It raises implications which throw grave doubts of the legislation being in the public interest. There is grave doubt as to its validity." Bastedo's constitutional advisors, however, did not share his assessment and advised him to grant royal assent.

Bastedo had not consulted with the federal government before taking action. The Diefenbaker government passed an order-in-council approving Bill 56.

The Bastedo incident is the last in Canada where a vice-regal representative refused royal assent.

Bastedo was the first (and probably the only) Canadian provincial Lieutenant-Governor to have been of Spanish ancestral origin; he is descended from Jacob Bastedo, a Protestant who fled persecution in Spain to the Netherlands centuries ago. From there the family migrated to England, the American Colonies, and then as United Empire Loyalists, to Canada. He was related to the British actress Alexandra Bastedo.
