= Sidney Bingham =

Canadian politician

Sidney Bingham (January 2, 1875 – 1938) was an English-born farmer and political figure in Saskatchewan. He represented Wilkie in the Legislative Assembly of Saskatchewan from 1921 to 1925 as a Progressive Party member.

He was born in Harpenden, the son of Arthur Bingham and Emily Plummer, and came to Canada in 1905. In 1895, Bingham had married Mary Lee. He lived in Wolfe, Saskatchewan. Bingham was defeated by Robert Nay when he ran for reelection to the provincial assembly in 1925.
