= Regina Albert Park =

Former provincial electoral district in Saskatchewan, Canada

Regina Albert Park was a constituency of the Legislative Assembly of Saskatchewan.

== Representation ==
- Kenneth Roy MacLeod (1971 to 1975)

== See also ==
- List of Saskatchewan provincial electoral districts
- List of Saskatchewan general elections
- Canadian provincial electoral districts
