= William Willoughby Miller =

Canadian politician

William Willoughby Miller (September 12, 1880 – 1959) was a merchant and political figure in Saskatchewan. He represented Biggar from 1929 to 1934 in the Legislative Assembly of Saskatchewan as a Conservative.

He was born in Brockville, Ontario, the son of Willoughby Miller and Isabella Baker, and was educated in Greenbush. Miller joined his brother in New York City, where he worked in a grocery and butcher business for three years. In 1906, he married Lillian Powell. Miller farmed in Leeds County for six years and then, in 1910, travelled west to Biggar, Saskatchewan, where he purchased a general store. He later became the local dealer for Chevrolet and McLaughlin automobiles and the owner of a garage. Miller served on the Biggar city council and the local school board. He was defeated by Robert Pelham Hassard when he ran for reelection to the provincial assembly in 1934.
