= Gerard Aldridge =

Canadian provincial politician

MLA for Thunder Creek
- In office 1995–1999
- Preceded by: Richard Swenson
- Succeeded by: Lyle Stewart

Personal details
- Born: 1958 (age 67–68)
- Party: Saskatchewan Liberal Party

Gerard Aldridge is a Canadian provincial politician. He was a Liberal member of the Legislative Assembly of Saskatchewan from 1995 to 1999, representing the constituency of Thunder Creek.

== Electoral record ==
1999 Saskatchewan general election: Thunder Creek
Party	Candidate	Votes	%	±%
Saskatchewan	Lyle Stewart	3,969	52.95%	-
Liberal	Gerard Aldridge	2,031	27.09%	-10.40
NDP	Ivan Costley	1,496	19.96%	-10.90
Total		7,496	100.00%	

1995 Saskatchewan general election: Thunder Creek
Party	Candidate	Votes	%	±%
Liberal	Gerard Aldridge	2,859	37.49%	+13.65
Prog. Conservative	Janet Day	2,414	31.65%	-10.96
NDP	Lewis Draper	2,353	30.86%	-1.73
Total		7,626	100.00%	
