= John Cunningham Knowles =

Canadian politician

John Cunningham Knowles MBE ED

Member of the Saskatchewan Legislative Assembly for Wilkie
- In office 1938–1944
- Preceded by: John Jardine
- Succeeded by: Hans Ove Hansen

Personal details
- Born: October 15, 1894 Severn Bridge, Ontario, Canada
- Died: August 31, 1977 (aged 82)
- Party: Liberal
- Occupation: Farmer

John Cunningham Knowles MBE ED (October 15, 1894 – August 31, 1977) was a Canadian farmer and political figure in Saskatchewan. He represented Wilkie in the Legislative Assembly of Saskatchewan from 1938 to 1944 as a member of the Liberal Party.

Knowles was born in Severn Bridge, Ontario, the son of Robert Knowles and Mary Elizabeth Cunningham. He was educated at Ufford and at the Northern Business College in Owen Sound. During the First World War he served overseas in France and Flanders. After the war he moved west and took up farming near Unity, where he sat on the municipal council and on the boards of the Saskatchewan School Trustees Association and the Saskatchewan Association of Rural Municipalities. He married Inez Viola Mead in 1927.

Knowles was first elected to the legislature in the 1938 general election, succeeding the retiring Liberal member John Jardine in Wilkie. He was defeated in the 1944 general election, when the Co-operative Commonwealth Federation under Tommy Douglas came to power across the province and the seat passed to the CCF candidate Hans Ove Hansen.

Knowles also served in the Canadian Army during the Second World War, and in 1946 he was appointed a Member of the Order of the British Empire for his military service. After the war he managed a real estate firm in Regina until he retired in 1965. He died on August 31, 1977.

Preceded by John Jardine	Member of the Legislative Assembly of Saskatchewan for Wilkie; 1938–1944	Succeeded by Hans Ove Hansen
