= James William Arthur Garner =

Canadian politician

The Honourable Jim Garner ECS

MLA for Wilkie
- In office 1978–1986
- Preceded by: Linda Clifford
- Succeeded by: John Britton

Personal details
- Born: James William Arthur Garner; August 19, 1944 (age 81) Wilkie, Saskatchewan, Canada
- Party: Saskatchewan Progressive Conservative Party
- Occupation: Farmer, rancher

James William Arthur "Jim" Garner (born August 19, 1944) is a Canadian farmer, rancher and former political figure in Saskatchewan, Canada. He represented Wilkie from 1978 to 1986 in the Legislative Assembly of Saskatchewan as a Progressive Conservative.

He was born in Wilkie, Saskatchewan, the son of William J. Garner and Lillian Brown, and was educated there. In 1967, he married Marie Angeline Harriet Skeates. Garner was defeated by Linda Clifford when he ran for the Wilkie seat in the Saskatchewan assembly in 1975; he defeated Clifford to win the seat in 1978. Garner served in the provincial cabinet as Minister of Highways. He resigned from cabinet after it was revealed that he had diverted a Saskatchewan government plane to Unity to take him and his family to Regina. Garner did not run for reelection in 1986.
