= John Nilson =

Canadian politician

The Honourable John Nilson ECS
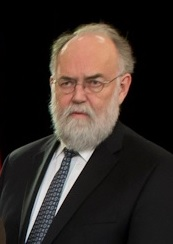

Leader of the Opposition of Saskatchewan
- In office November 19, 2011 – March 9, 2013
- Preceded by: Dwain Lingenfelter
- Succeeded by: Cam Broten

Leader of the Saskatchewan New Democratic Party Interim
- In office November 19, 2011 – March 9, 2013
- Preceded by: Dwain Lingenfelter
- Succeeded by: Cam Broten

Member of the Legislative Assembly of Saskatchewan for Regina Lakeview
- In office June 21, 1995 – March 8, 2016
- Preceded by: Louise Simard
- Succeeded by: Carla Beck

Personal details
- Born: July 9, 1951 (age 75) Saskatoon, Saskatchewan, Canada
- Party: New Democratic Party
- Education: Pacific Lutheran University; University of Oslo; St. Olaf College; University of British Columbia
- Occupation: Lawyer

John Nilson (born July 9, 1951) is a retired Canadian politician from Saskatchewan. He was a Saskatchewan New Democratic Party member of the Legislative Assembly of Saskatchewan for the Regina Lakeview constituency from 1995 to 2016. He served as interim leader of the party from 2011 to 2013.

== Early life and career ==
Nilson was born in Saskatoon and was raised in Western Canada. He pursued his education at Pacific Lutheran University, the University of Oslo, St. Olaf College, and the University of British Columbia, where he obtained his law degree in 1977. He was admitted to the British Columbia bar in 1978 and the Saskatchewan bar in 1979. He practiced law and mediation with Macpherson, Leslie and Tyerman until he was first elected to the Legislature in 1995.

== Political career ==
Nilson was first elected in the 1995 provincial election, which resulted in a second consecutive majority government for the New Democrats (NDP) under Roy Romanow. Nilson was appointed Minister of Justice and Attorney General on November 22, 1995. Boasting Norwegian heritage, Nilson would become known for taking some time to speak Norwegian in the legislature each year on or around Norwegian Constitution Day. In 1997, Nilson was accosted at the legislature by a man who claimed he was placing Nilson under citizen's arrest; the man was detained by security and charged with assault. The incident led to security reforms at the legislature.

Nilson later served as Minister of Crown Investments Corporation, Minister of Health, and Minister of Environment. He became Saskatchewan's longest-serving health minister and in that role oversaw a ban on smoking in public spaces and the public display of cigarettes, which he later cited as a highlight of his career.

The NDP lost the 2007 election to the Saskatchewan Party, after which Nilson was named Opposition critic for Intergovernmental Affairs.

Nilson was re-elected in the 2011 election; however, the NDP was reduced to just nine seats, and party leader Dwain Lingenfelter lost his own seat and resigned. In the wake of the election, Nilson was unanimously chosen as interim leader of the party until a new leader was elected. Nilson stated at the time that he would not run for the party leadership. As Opposition leader, Nilson unsuccessfully opposed the expansion of seats in the legislature from 58 to 61, and more successfully urged the government against extensive labour reforms, including a proposal to allow union members to opt out of paying union dues. On March 9, 2013, Cam Broten was elected as the new leader at the party's leadership convention.

Nilson announced in December 2014 that he would not run in the next election and would be retiring from politics; he would continue to sit as an MLA until the Assembly was dissolved for the 2016 general election.

== Electoral history ==
2011 Saskatchewan general election: Regina Lakeview
Party	Candidate	Votes	%	±%
NDP	John Nilson	3,860	48.38	+0.76
Saskatchewan	Bob Hawkins	3,715	46.56	+14.16
Green	Mike Wright	404	5.06	+0.70
Total			100.00	

2007 Saskatchewan general election: Regina Lakeview
Party	Candidate	Votes	%	±%
NDP	John Nilson	4,275	47.62	-9,29
Saskatchewan	Raynelle Wilson	2,909	32.40	+12,08
Liberal	Matt Sirois	1,400	15.59	-5,73
Green	Robert Cosbey	392	4.36	+2.98
Total		8,976	100.00	

2003 Saskatchewan general election: Regina Lakeview
Party	Candidate	Votes	%	±%
NDP	John Nilson	4,988	56.91	+7.60
Liberal	Dave Brundige	1,875	21.39	-4.08
Saskatchewan	Michelle Hunter	1,781	20.32	-0.09
New Green	Brian Rands	121	1.38	–
Total		8,976	100.00	

1999 Saskatchewan general election: Regina Lakeview
Party	Candidate	Votes	%	±%
NDP	John Nilson	4,207	49.31	-5.38
Liberal	Karen Pedersen	2.173	25.47	-12.71
Saskatchewan	Randall Edge	1,741	20.41	–
Independent	Wayne Gilmer	295	3.46	–
Progressive Conservative	Brad Johnson	116	1.36	-5.77
Total		8,976	100.00	

1995 Saskatchewan general election: Regina Lakeview
Party	Candidate	Votes	%	±%
NDP	John Nilson	4,807	54.69	–
Liberal	Karen Pedersen	3.356	38.18	–
Progressive Conservative	Brad Johnson	627	7.13	–
Total		8,976	100.00	
