= Roy Edgar Nelson =

Canadian politician (1925–2012)

MLA for Assiniboia-Gravelbourg
- In office 1975–1978

Personal details
- Born: December 3, 1925
- Died: March 26, 2012 (aged 86)
- Party: Liberal Party of Saskatchewan

Roy Edgar Nelson (December 3, 1925 – March 26, 2012) was a Canadian provincial politician. He was the Liberal member of the Legislative Assembly of Saskatchewan for the constituency of Assiniboia-Gravelbourg, from 1975 until 1978. He was the first MLA for the Assiniboia-Gravelbourg district, representing the riding for a single term before losing to Allen Willard Engel of the NDP in the 1978 general election.

Before entering politics, Roy Nelson served in the Royal Canadian Navy in the Second World War. After the war he was in business, then farmed and ranched in the Glentworth area in southern Saskatchewan. He was active within the community, serving as president of the curling rink and leading the rink building committee, president of the Wood River Legion bantam baseball league, director and vice-president of the community hall and as local branch president and zone commander for the Royal Canadian Legion. He also coached bantam baseball and minor hockey, as well as organized hockey and baseball schools.

After his term as MLA, he served as chairman of the Grasslands National Park Advisory Committee and as national president of the Canadian Piedmontese Cattle Association. He also served on the boards of the local credit union, United Church, union hospital, village council and school as well as volunteering for the local fire department and ambulance.

In 1997 he received the Saskatchewan Volunteer Medal.

He died of cancer on March 26, 2012.
