= Regina Albert North =

Saskatchewan electoral district

Defunct provincial electoral district
- Legislature: Legislative Assembly of Saskatchewan
- District created: 1991
- First contested: 1991
- Last contested: 1991

Demographics
- Census division: Division 6
- Census subdivision: Regina

Regina Albert Norths was a provincial electoral district for the Legislative Assembly of Saskatchewan, Canada. It consisted of the Regina neighbourhoods of Uplands, Argyle Park, and Walsh Acres.

It existed for one election in 1991. It was created out of parts of Regina North West, and Regina North. It was abolished into Regina Qu'Appelle Valley, Regina Sherwood, Regina Coronation Park and Regina Northeast.

== Members of the Legislative Assembly ==
Legislature	Years	Member	Party
22nd	1991–1995	Kim Trew	New Democrat

== Election results ==
1991 Saskatchewan general election
Party	Candidate	Votes	%
NDP	Kim Trew	5,313	60.97
Liberal	Herbert W. Haynes	2,520	28.92
Prog. Conservative	Roy Gaebel	881	10.11
Total		8,714	100.00
Source: Elections Saskatchewan
