= Robert Pelham Hassard =

Canadian politician

Robert Pelham "Bob" Hassard (March 7, 1888 – September 28, 1953) was a car dealer, farmer and political figure in Saskatchewan. He represented Biggar from 1925 to 1929 and from 1934 to 1938 in the Legislative Assembly of Saskatchewan as a Liberal.

He was born in Macdonald, Manitoba, the son of John Hassard, and was educated in Dauphin. Hassard moved to Biggar, Saskatchewan in 1908. In 1920, he married Mary E. Stewart. Hassard served several years as mayor of Biggar. He also operated a garage and a hotel there.

He was defeated by William Willoughby Miller when he ran for reelection to the Saskatchewan assembly in 1929 but then defeated Miller in the general election held in 1934. Hassard was defeated by John Allan Young in the 1938 general election.

In 1946, he left Biggar for Eastend, living there for about a year, and then moved to Saskatoon, before going to Calgary, Alberta around 1951. Hassard died in Holy Cross Hospital in Calgary at the age of 65.
