= Wilkie (electoral district) =

Former provincial electoral district in Saskatchewan, Canada

Coordinates: 52°25′N 109°15′W

Wilkie was a provincial electoral district for the Legislative Assembly of the province of Saskatchewan, Canada, centred on the town of Wilkie. Created as "Tramping Lake" before the 3rd Saskatchewan general election in 1912, this constituency was renamed "Wilkie" in 1917.

This riding was arguably one of the most conservative in the province, having only once elected a member of the CCF or NDP — in the CCF's 1944 landslide victory.

The district was dissolved before the 23rd Saskatchewan general election in 1995. It is now part of the ridings of Biggar, Cut Knife-Turtleford, and Kindersley.

== Members of the Legislative Assembly ==
#	MLA	Served	Party
1.	James Murray Scott	1912 – 1917	Liberal
2.	Reuben Martin	1917 – 1921	Liberal
3.	Sidney Bingham	1921 – 1925	Progressive
4.	Robert Erie Nay	1925 – 1929	Liberal
5.	Alexander John McLeod	1929 – 1934	Conservative
6.	John Jardine	1934 – 1938	Liberal
7.	John C. Knowles	1938 – 1944	Liberal
8.	Hans O. Hansen	1944 – 1948	CCF
9.	John W. Horsman	1948 – 1964	Liberal
10.	Cliff McIsaac	1964 – 1975	Liberal
11.	Linda Clifford	1975 – 1978	Liberal
12.	Jim Garner	1978 – 1986	Progressive Conservative
13.	John Britton	1986 – 1995	Progressive Conservative

== Election results ==
1912 Saskatchewan general election: Tramping Lake electoral district
Party	Candidate	Votes	%	±%
Liberal	James Murray Scott	1,117	55.99%	–
Conservative	Robert James Speers	878	44.01%	–
Total		1,995	100.00%	

1917 Saskatchewan general election: Wilkie electoral district
Party	Candidate	Votes	%	±%
Liberal	Reuben Martin	1,783	48.05%	-7.94
Conservative	Henry Oswald Wright	1,005	27.08%	-16.93
Nonpartisan League	Donald Jerome Haight	923	24.87%	–
Total		3,711	100.00%	

1921 Saskatchewan general election: Wilkie electoral district
Party	Candidate	Votes	%	±%
Progressive	Sidney Bingham	1,694	51.50%	+26.63
Liberal	Reuben Martin	1,595	48.50%	+0.45
Total		3,289	100.00%	

1925 Saskatchewan general election: Wilkie electoral district
Party	Candidate	Votes	%	±%
Liberal	Robert Nay	2,281	69.69%	+21.19
Progressive	Sidney Bingham	992	30.31%	-21.19
Total		3,273	100.00%	

1929 Saskatchewan general election: Wilkie electoral district
Party	Candidate	Votes	%	±%
Conservative	Alexander McLeod	2,814	51.07%	-
Liberal	Robert Nay	2,696	48.93%	-20.76
Total		5,510	100.00%	

1934 Saskatchewan general election: Wilkie electoral district
Party	Candidate	Votes	%	±%
Liberal	John Jardine	3,702	48.47%	-0.46
Farmer-Labour	George Joseph Hindley	2,011	26.33%	-
Conservative	Alexander McLeod	1,925	25.20%	-25.87
Total		7,638	100.00%	

1938 Saskatchewan general election: Wilkie electoral district
Party	Candidate	Votes	%	±%
Liberal	John C. Knowles	4,053	59.17%	+10.70
Social Credit	Frank R. Beggs	2,797	40.83%	–
Total		6,850	100.00%	

1944 Saskatchewan general election: Wilkie electoral district
Party	Candidate	Votes	%	±%
CCF	Hans O. Hansen	3,567	58.53%	-
Liberal	John C. Knowles	2,527	41.47%	-17.70
Total		6,094	100.00%	

1948 Saskatchewan general election: Wilkie electoral district
Party	Candidate	Votes	%	±%
Liberal	John Horsman	3,143	43.97%	+2.50
CCF	Hans O. Hansen	2,566	35.90%	-22.63
Social Credit	George Keith Nicholson	1,110	15.53%	-
Prog. Conservative	O. Allan Bentley	329	4.60%	-
Total		7,148	100.00%	

1952 Saskatchewan general election: Wilkie electoral district
Party	Candidate	Votes	%	±%
Liberal	John Horsman	3,199	45.35%	+1.38
CCF	Hans O. Hansen	3,067	43.48%	+7.58
Social Credit	T. Gauley	788	11.17%	-4.36
Total		7,054	100.00%	

1956 Saskatchewan general election: Wilkie electoral district
Party	Candidate	Votes	%	±%
Liberal	John Horsman	3,684	46.03%	+0.68
CCF	Samuel Onerheim	2,849	35.60%	-7.88
Social Credit	William R. Leeson	1,470	18.37%	+7.20
Total		8,003	100.00%	

1960 Saskatchewan general election: Wilkie electoral district
Party	Candidate	Votes	%	±%
Liberal	John Horsman	3,463	45.22%	-0.81
CCF	Lewis R. Thomas	2,315	30.23%	-5.37
Social Credit	William R. Leeson	1,220	15.93%	-2.44
Prog. Conservative	Walter O. Smith	660	8.62%	-
Total		7,658	100.00%	

1964 Saskatchewan general election: Wilkie electoral district
Party	Candidate	Votes	%	±%
Liberal	J. Clifford McIsaac	3,593	48.53%	+3.31
CCF	W. Ray Grant	2,162	29.20%	-1.03
Prog. Conservative	Donald Wallace	1,649	22.27%	+13.65
Total		7,404	100.00%	

1967 Saskatchewan general election: Wilkie electoral district
Party	Candidate	Votes	%	±%
Liberal	J. Clifford McIsaac	3,817	61.04%	+12.51
NDP	Norman Heather	2,436	38.96%	+9.76
Total		6,253	100.00%	

1971 Saskatchewan general election: Wilkie electoral district
Party	Candidate	Votes	%	±%
Liberal	J. Clifford McIsaac	3,309	51.31%	-9.73
NDP	Dick Scotton	3,140	48.69%	+9.73
Total		6,449	100.00%	

1975 Saskatchewan general election: Wilkie electoral district
Party	Candidate	Votes	%	±%
Liberal	Linda Clifford	2,831	39.36%	-11.95
NDP	Delaine Scotton	2,223	30.91%	-17.78
Progressive Conservative	Jim Garner	2,138	29.73%	-
Total		7,192	100.00%	

1978 Saskatchewan general election: Wilkie electoral district
Party	Candidate	Votes	%	±%
Progressive Conservative	Jim Garner	2,865	39.73%	+10.00
NDP	Ray Heather	2,371	32.88%	+1.97
Liberal	Linda Clifford	1,975	27.39%	-11.97
Total		7,211	100.00%	

1982 Saskatchewan general election: Wilkie electoral district
Party	Candidate	Votes	%	±%
Progressive Conservative	Jim Garner	5,056	66.55%	+26.82
NDP	Wayne Birn	2,039	26.84%	-6.04
Liberal	Arthur L. Reil	502	6.61%	-20.78
Total		7,597	100.00%	

1986 Saskatchewan general election: Wilkie electoral district
Party	Candidate	Votes	%	±%
Progressive Conservative	John Britton	3,457	48.35%	-18.20
NDP	Ted Zoller	2,151	30.09%	+3.25
Liberal	Nicodemus B. Volk	1,541	21.56%	+14.95
Total		7,149	100.00%	

1991 Saskatchewan general election: Wilkie electoral district
Party	Candidate	Votes	%	±%
Progressive Conservative	John Britton	2,601	38.54%	-9.81
NDP	Sharon Murrell	2,295	34.00%	+3.91
Liberal	Nick Volk	1,853	27.46%	+5.90
Total		6,749	100.00%	

== See also ==
- List of Saskatchewan provincial electoral districts
- List of Saskatchewan general elections
- Canadian provincial electoral districts
