= Richard Swenson =

Canadian politician

The Honourable Richard Swenson ECS

Leader of the Saskatchewan PC Party
- In office 2006–2018
- Preceded by: Iris Dennis
- Succeeded by: Ken Grey

Leader of the Opposition in Saskatchewan
- In office 1993–1994
- Preceded by: Grant Devine
- Succeeded by: Bill Boyd

Member of the Legislative Assembly for Thunder Creek
- In office 1985–1995
- Preceded by: Colin Thatcher
- Succeeded by: Gerard Aldridge

Personal details
- Born: April 12, 1952 (age 74) Moose Jaw, Saskatchewan
- Party: Progressive Conservative (1985-1997, 2006-present); Saskatchewan Party (1997-1999)
- Website: www.rickswenson.pcsask.ca

Richard James "Rick" Swenson (born April 12, 1952) is a provincial level politician from Saskatchewan, Canada. He was a member of the Saskatchewan Legislature from 1985 to 1995, and is still active in provincial politics. He was leader of the Progressive Conservative Party of Saskatchewan from 2006 until 2018.

He was born in Moose Jaw, Saskatchewan, the son of Donald Swenson, and grew up in the Baildon district. Swenson was educated at the University of Saskatchewan and the University of Regina. In 1976, he established Wheaton Bee Farms, specializing in alfalfa seed and dryland grass production. Swenson also helped form the Baildon/Moose Jaw Effluent Irrigation Project.

Swenson was elected to the Legislature in a by-election held in the Thunder Creek electoral district on March 27, 1985. The by-election had been held to replace former MLA Colin Thatcher who was convicted of murdering his wife. Swenson first defeated Thatcher's former executive assistant Lyle Stewart to secure the Progressive Conservative nomination before successfully holding the constituency for the then-governing PC's in the by-election, a hotly contested three-way race involving three other candidates which Swenson won with a plurality of 900 votes.

The Progressive Conservatives were returned to power with Swenson being re-elected just a little over a year later in the 1986 general election. He won that election by a much wider margin facing two of the three candidates that ran in the by-election. Swenson later served in the provincial cabinet as Minister of Energy and Mines and as Minister of Indian and Métis Affairs. Although the PC's were swept from power in the 1991 general election, Swenson managed to win a third term in his own seat with a reduced plurality. After Devine resigned from the legislature, Swenson served as interim leader of the Progressive Conservatives from October 8, 1992, to November 24, 1994. Swenson did not seek a fourth term in the 1995 election, in which his former seat would be won by Gerard Aldridge of the Liberal Party.

In 1997, Swenson along with most members of the PC Party and with a number of disaffected Liberals joined the newly formed Saskatchewan Party while the scandal-ridden PC's essentially went dormant under the nominal leadership of Iris Dennis. After it had become clear that Aldridge would remain with the Liberals, Swenson sought the Saskatchewan Party nomination in Thunder Creek for the 1999 election. This time, Swenson was defeated for the nomination by Stewart.

Swenson spent few years out of provincial politics before returning in 2006 when the Progressive Conservatives announced plans to revive the party after years of running paper candidates in order to avoid deregistration. He was elected as party leader, but was only able to attract four other candidates besides himself to run in the 2007 general election. Swenson ran as the Progressive Conservative candidate in the Thunder Creek constituency, placing a distant fourth out of five candidates. In the 2011 general election, the PC's again ran five candidates in total, with Swenson running this time in nearby Moose Jaw North, earning a similar number of votes compared to his 2007 result and placing a distant third out of four candidates. Swenson ran in Last Mountain-Touchwood in the 2016 general election and posted his best result as PC Leader, finishing in third place with about ten percent of the vote. His party ran eighteen candidates, although none finished better than third place.

Swenson announced in November 2016 that he will be stepping down as leader as soon as the party organizes a leadership convention.

== Electoral record ==
2011 Saskatchewan general election: Moose Jaw North
| Party | Candidate | Votes | % | ±% |
|---|---|---|---|---|
| Saskatchewan | Warren Michelson | 4,474 | 59.09% | - |
| NDP | Derek Hassen | 2,726 | 36.01% | - |
| Prog. Conservative | Richard Swenson | 273 | 3.61% | - |
| Green | Corinne Johnson | 98 | 1.29% | - |
| Total | | 7,571 | 100.00 | |

2007 Saskatchewan general election: Thunder Creek
| Party | Candidate | Votes | % | ±% |
|---|---|---|---|---|
| Saskatchewan | Lyle Stewart | 5,558 | 64.45% | +10.92 |
| NDP | Larry Hall | 1,997 | 23.16% | -7.65 |
| Liberal | Rod Haugerud | 590 | 6.84% | -6.84 |
| Prog. Conservative | Richard Swenson | 295 | 3.42% | - |
| Green | Russ Rudd | 184 | 2.13% | - |
| Total | | 8,624 | 100.00% | |

1991 Saskatchewan general election: Thunder Creek
| Party | Candidate | Votes | % | ±% |
|---|---|---|---|---|
| Progressive Conservative | Richard Swenson | 2,929 | 42.61% | -10.91 |
| NDP | Ron Bishoff | 2,240 | 32.59% | +6.15 |
| Liberal | Bill Johnstone | 1,639 | 23.84% | +4.34 |
| Independent | Dwayne McBride | 66 | 0.96% | - |
| Total | | 6,874 | 100.00% | |

1986 Saskatchewan general election: Thunder Creek
| Party | Candidate | Votes | % | ±% |
|---|---|---|---|---|
| Progressive Conservative | Richard Swenson | 3,773 | 53.52% | +11.03 |
| NDP | Betty Payne | 1,864 | 26.44% | -1.09 |
| Liberal | Bill Johnstone | 1,375 | 19.50% | -7.60 |
| Western Canada Concept | Robert Gleim | 38 | 0.54% | -2.34 |
| Total | | 7,050 | 100.00% | |

March 27, 1985 by-election: Thunder Creek resignation of Colin Thatcher
| Party | Candidate | Votes | % | ±% |
|---|---|---|---|---|
| Progressive Conservative | Richard Swenson | 2,670 | 42.49% | - |
| NDP | Betty Payne | 1,730 | 27.53% | - |
| Liberal | Bill Johnstone | 1,703 | 27.10% | - |
| Western Canada Concept | Henry Banman | 181 | 2.88% | - |
| Total | | 6,284 | 100.00% | |
