= Lewis Draper =

Canadian politician (born 1935)

Lewis Draper (b. 1935; full name: Charles Lewis Woodvine Draper) is a family physician, and author, who was a Canadian provincial politician. He was the NDP member of the Legislative Assembly of Saskatchewan for the constituency of Assiniboia-Gravelbourg, from 1991 until 1995. He defeated PC incumbent John Thomas Wolfe in the 1991 general election, and represented the riding for one term. The Assiniboia-Gravelbourg riding was dissolved before the next general election, so Draper ran for the riding of Thunder Creek, but lost to Liberal Gerard Aldridge.

Outside politics Lewis Draper was, and continues to be, a practicing medical doctor. The NDP government of which he was a part was involved in the closure of a large number of rural hospitals, which was a cause of conflict between him and his party.

Biographical data: Charles Lewis Woodvine Draper, M.B., Ch.B., L.M.C.C, C.C.F.P., F.R.G.S., F.C.F.P.(C), was born in Wallasey, England on 1 June 1935, the son of Charles Henry Lewis Draper and Irene Agnes (Handcock) Draper. He was educated at West Cliff H.S. and Wallasey Grammar School. He received his medical education at University of Glasgow (M.B., Ch.B.), graduating in 1961. He married Erica Louise Rubin, a Jewish Holocaust survivor, daughter of Hans and Marthe Rubin on 22 July 1959, she died in 1998. Their five children are: Ingrid, Adrian, Darryl, Tracey, and Nathalie. He married Patrica Anne (Warde) on 19 July 2003. His professional career history includes: Examiner, College of Family Physicians of Canada; Staff, Moose Jaw Union Hosp.; Coroner, Civil Aviation Medical Examiner; Insurance Medical Examiner (most companies); postgraduate training in surgery, Scotland & England; tropical medicine, Lagos, Nigeria 1965-66. He relocated to Saskatchewan Canada, establishing a family practice in Lafleche, Saskatchewan 1967-76; Gravelbourg, Saskatchewan 1976-93; Chief of Staff, Lafleche Union Hospital; Chief of Staff, St. Josephs Hospital, Gravelbourg; visiting privileges, Assiniboia Union Hospital, Ponteix U.H., Kincaid, Mankota U.H., Vanguard & Mossbank U.H.; Alderman, Gravelbourg Town Council 1978-85; Mayor, Town of Gravelbourg 1985-91; Member, Saskatchewan Legislative Assembly 1991-95; elected Member, South Country District Health Board (Chairman. Finance Committee.; Member of Three Person Executive); President, Lafleche & District Music Festival Assn.; Fellow, Royal Geographic Society; Fellow, College of Family Physicians of Canada 2003, elected Life Member, 2004; Senior Life Member, Saskatchewan Medical Association; Canadian Medical Association.; recipient, Canada 125 Medal 1992; Saskatchewan Centennial Medal 2005; member, United Church of Canada; New Democratic Party; Past Master, Woodrow Masonic Lodge 112 AF & AM; author of medical articles; languages spoken and written: English, French, German; recreations have included mountaineering, music, fencing, chess, sailing, flying.

He resides at his farm, High Hill House, at Lumsden, Saskatchewan. He is still a practicing medical doctor, working part-time at a clinic in Regina, as of December, 2016 at age 81. He has written four books: Jesus the Nazarite?, Prairie Doctor, Health Care DEform in Saskatchewan, and More Prairie Doctor.
