= Regina Lake Centre =

Former provincial electoral district in Saskatchewan, Canada

Regina Lake Centre was a provincial electoral district for the Legislative Assembly of Saskatchewan, Canada from 1991 to 1995. It was created from territories from Regina Lakeview, Regina Centre and Regina South. While it existed, it was represented by NDP MLA Joanne Crofford. It was dissolved after the 1991 election, following a reduction in the amount of MLAs from 66 to 58. Its territory was divided between the ridings of Regina Lakeview, Regina Centre and Regina Northeast.

== Election result ==
1991 Saskatchewan general election
Party	Candidate	Votes	%	±%
NDP	Joanne Crofford	6,286	62.77	–
Liberal	Micheal R. Giles	2,432	24.29	–
Prog. Conservative	Bill Pratt	1,296	12.94	–
Total		10,014	100.00	

== See also ==
- List of Saskatchewan provincial electoral districts
- List of Saskatchewan general elections
- Canadian provincial electoral districts
