= John Allan Young =

Canadian politician

John Allan Young (February 7, 1895 – 1961) was a Scottish-born political figure in Saskatchewan. He represented Biggar from 1938 to 1944 in the Legislative Assembly of Saskatchewan as a Co-operative Commonwealth Federation (CCF) member.

He was born in Glasgow, the son of William McKie Young and Margaret Allan, was educated in Scotland and emigrated to Canada in 1911. He served overseas with the Canadian Expeditionary Force during World War I.

In 1918, Young married Eva M. Head. He lived in Perdue, Saskatchewan. Young ran unsuccessfully as a Liberal candidate against George John McLean for the Cut Knife seat in the provincial assembly in 1929. Young served as Deputy Provincial Secretary for the province from 1946 to 1952. In 1947, he was named to the board of directors of the Saskatchewan Government Telephones crown corporation.
