= Thunder Creek (1975–2016 electoral district) =

Former provincial electoral district in Saskatchewan, Canada

Coordinates: 50°40′N 106°20′W

Saskatchewan electoral district
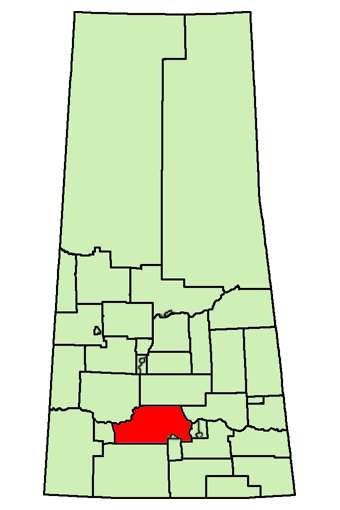

Defunct provincial electoral district
- Legislature: Legislative Assembly of Saskatchewan
- District created: 1975
- First contested: 1975
- Last contested: 2011

Demographics
- Electors: 11,112
- Census division(s): Division 6, 7, 11

Thunder Creek was a provincial electoral district for the Legislative Assembly of Saskatchewan, Canada. Originally created for the 3rd Saskatchewan general election in 1912 and abolished in 1938, this constituency was reconstituted for the 18th Saskatchewan general election in 1975. It was abolished a second time in 2016, with most of the constituency being re-distributed into the new electoral district of Lumsden-Morse.

Communities in the district included the towns of Lumsden, Caronport, Regina Beach, Morse, Craik, and Herbert; and the villages of Central Butte, Chaplin, Elbow, Mortlach, Riverhurst, Waldeck, Eyebrow, and Bethune.

== Members of the Legislative Assembly ==
Parliament	Years	Member	Party
District created from Lumsden, Morse, Arm River, Milestone, Gravelbourg, Assiniboia-Bengough, Moose Jaw North, Moose Jaw South
18th	1975 – 1978	Colin Thatcher	Liberal
19th	1978 – 1982	Colin Thatcher	Progressive Conservative
20th	1982 – 1984	Colin Thatcher	Progressive Conservative
20th	1985 – 1986	Richard Swenson	Progressive Conservative
21st	1986 – 1991	Richard Swenson	Progressive Conservative
22nd	1991 – 1995	Richard Swenson	Progressive Conservative
23rd	1995 – 1999	Gerard Aldridge	Liberal
24th	1999 – 2003	Lyle Stewart	Saskatchewan Party
25th	2003 – 2007	Lyle Stewart	Saskatchewan Party
26th	2007 – 2011	Lyle Stewart	Saskatchewan Party
27th	2011 – 2016	Lyle Stewart	Saskatchewan Party
District dissolved into Lumsden-Morse, Arm River, Moose Jaw North, Moose Jaw Wakamow, Wood River

== Election results ==
2011 Saskatchewan general election: Thunder Creek
Party	Candidate	Votes	%	±%
Saskatchewan	Lyle Stewart	5,920	79.61%	+15.16
NDP	Ryan McDonald	1,304	17.54%	-5.62
Green	Jill Forrester	212	2.85%	+0.72
Total		7,436	100.00%	

2007 Saskatchewan general election: Thunder Creek
Party	Candidate	Votes	%	±%
Saskatchewan	Lyle Stewart	5,558	64.45%	+10.92
NDP	Larry Hall	1,997	23.16%	-7.65
Liberal	Rod Haugerud	590	6.84%	-6.84
Prog. Conservative	Richard Swenson	295	3.42%	-
Green	Russ Rudd	184	2.13%	–
Total		8,624	100.00%	

2003 Saskatchewan general election
Party	Candidate	Votes	%	±%
Saskatchewan	Lyle Stewart	4,450	53.50%	+0.58
New Democratic	Larry Hall	2,572	30.92%	+10.85
Liberal	Rod Haugerud	1,132	13.61%	−13.41
Western Independence	Harold Stephan	164	1.97%	–
Total		8,318	100.00%	

1999 Saskatchewan general election: Thunder Creek
Party	Candidate	Votes	%	±%
Saskatchewan	Lyle Stewart	3,969	52.95%	–
Liberal	Gerard Aldridge	2,031	27.09%	-10.40
NDP	Ivan Costley	1,496	19.96%	-10.90
Total		7,496	100.00%	

1995 Saskatchewan general election: Thunder Creek
Party	Candidate	Votes	%	±%
Liberal	Gerard Aldridge	2,859	37.49%	+13.65
Prog. Conservative	Janet Day	2,414	31.65%	-10.96
NDP	Lewis Draper	2,353	30.86%	-1.73
Total		7,626	100.00%	

1991 Saskatchewan general election: Thunder Creek
Party	Candidate	Votes	%	±%
Progressive Conservative	Richard Swenson	2,929	42.61%	-10.91
NDP	Ron Bishoff	2,240	32.59%	+6.15
Liberal	Bill Johnstone	1,639	23.84%	+4.34
Independent	Dwayne McBride	66	0.96%	–
Total		6,874	100.00%	

1986 Saskatchewan general election: Thunder Creek
Party	Candidate	Votes	%	±%
Progressive Conservative	Richard Swenson	3,773	53.52%	+11.03
NDP	Betty Payne	1,864	26.44%	-1.09
Liberal	Bill Johnstone	1,375	19.50%	-7.60
Western Canada Concept	Robert Gleim	38	0.54%	-2.34
Total		7,050	100.00%	

March 27, 1985 By-Election: Thunder Creek
Party	Candidate	Votes	%	±%
Progressive Conservative	Richard Swenson	2,670	42.49%	–
NDP	Betty Payne	1,730	27.53%	–
Liberal	Bill Johnstone	1,703	27.10%	–
Western Canada Concept	Henry Banman	181	2.88%	–
Total		6,284	100.00%	

== See also ==
- List of Saskatchewan provincial electoral districts
- List of Saskatchewan general elections
- Thunder Creek
