= Regina Hillsdale =

Former provincial electoral district in Saskatchewan, Canada

Regina Hillsdale was a provincial electoral district for the Legislative Assembly of Saskatchewan, Canada from 1991 to 1995. It was created from territories from Regina Lakeview and Regina Wascana. While it existed, it was represented by NDP MLA Louise Simard. It was dissolved after the 1991 election, following a reduction in the amount of MLAs from 66 to 58. Its territory was divided between the ridings of Regina Lakeview and Regina South.

== Election result ==
1991 Saskatchewan general election
| Party | Candidate | Votes | % | ±% |
|---|---|---|---|---|
| NDP | Louise Simard | 4,851 | 51.29 | – |
| Liberal | Larry Bird | 2,930 | 30.98 | – |
| Prog. Conservative | Shirley Shneider | 1,677 | 17.73 | – |
| Total | | 9,458 | 100.00 | |

== See also ==
- List of Saskatchewan provincial electoral districts
- List of Saskatchewan general elections
- Canadian provincial electoral districts
