= John Thomas Wolfe =

Canadian politician (1955–1995)

John (Jack) Thomas Wolfe

MLA for Assiniboia-Gravelbourg
- In office 1988–1991
- Preceded by: Ralph Goodale
- Succeeded by: Lewis Draper

Associate Minister of Health
- In office October 3, 1988 – November 27, 1990

Minister of Urban Affairs
- In office November 27, 1990 – January 1, 1991

Minister of Community Services
- In office January 1, 1991 – November 1, 1991

Personal details
- Born: May 2, 1955 Rockglen, Saskatchewan
- Died: February 2, 1995 (aged 39) Rockglen, Saskatchewan
- Party: Progressive Conservative Party of Saskatchewan
- Spouse: Susan (Gail) Wolfe

John (Jack) Thomas Wolfe (May 2, 1955 – February 2, 1995) was a community veterinarian before becoming a Canadian provincial politician. He was the Progressive Conservative member of the Legislative Assembly of Saskatchewan for the constituency of Assiniboia-Gravelbourg, from 1988 until 1991.

== Early life ==
Wolfe was born in Rockglen, Saskatchewan on May 2, 1955, and was raised on the Wolfe family ranch within the Killdeer, Saskatchewan district west of Rockglen. He attended school at Killdeer before completing high school in Rockglen. He studied biology at the University of Saskatchewan and in 1979 he graduated with distinction from the Western College of Veterinary Medicine.

== Professional career ==
Wolfe practiced as a veterinarian in Alberta for one year before returning to his home in Rockglen, Saskatchewan, where he ran the Borderland Veterinary Clinic with his wife, Dr. Gail Wolfe (maiden name: Snyder), whom he had married on January 26, 1980. Wolfe also worked as a veterinarian for the thoroughbred and standard bred racetracks in Regina and Saskatoon during the racing seasons for several years. He was extensively involved in community economic development projects and was chairman of the first Rural Development Corporation in the province.

== Political career ==
Wolfe was elected in a by-election called to replace Liberal party leader and future federal cabinet minister Ralph Goodale, when Goodale retired from provincial politics to run in the 1988 federal election. He served a single term, and was defeated by Lewis Draper of the NDP in the 1991 general election.

During Wolfe's term as an MLA in the Progressive Conservative Party of Saskatchewan he held several titles, including:

- Associate Minister of Health - Oct 3, 1988 to Nov 27, 1990
- Minister of Urban Affairs - Nov 27, 1990 to Jan 1, 1991
- Minister of Community Services - Jan 1, 1991 to Nov 1, 1991

He was also involved with the Saskatchewan Property Management Corporation and the Saskatchewan Housing Corporation from March 16, 1990, to November 1, 1991.

== Death ==
Wolfe died in the early hours of February 2, 1995 due to a self-inflicted gunshot wound. The father of three—and soon to be four—back in his veterinary practice, was anguished at the prospect of being forced to testify against his old friends and ex-colleagues. When told in 1995 that he also potentially faced arrest (charges were never pressed), he shot himself. A former party worker says Jack was an innocent killed by a corrupt system. Jack's wife Gail says her husband's dream of public service was shattered.

He was cremated and buried at the Killdeer community cemetery, which happens to sit upon the site of the original Wolfe family homestead, from his grandfather's immigration, and also directly beside the former farmyard in which he spent his early years.
