= Saskatoon Broadway =

Former provincial electoral district in Saskatchewan, Canada

Saskatoon Broadway was a constituency of the Legislative Assembly of Saskatchewan. It was located in the Broadway Avenue area of city of Saskatoon.

== History ==
Pat Atkinson was the riding's only member.

== See also ==
- List of Saskatchewan provincial electoral districts
- List of Saskatchewan general elections
- Canadian provincial electoral districts
