= Robert Erie Nay =

Canadian politician

Robert Erie Nay (September 3, 1885 – January 1, 1976) was a lawyer, judge and political figure in Saskatchewan. He represented Wilkie in the Legislative Assembly of Saskatchewan from 1925 to 1929 as a Liberal.

He was born in Huron County, Ontario, the son of J.J. Nay, and was educated in Minga, Manitoba and at Manitoba University. Nay went on to study law in Winnipeg and Saskatoon, Saskatchewan. He was called to the Saskatchewan bar in 1910 and entered practice in Scott. In 1911, he married Myrtle K. Bishop. Nay was named agent of the Attorney General in 1914. He moved to Wilkie in 1919 when the judicial centre was moved there. Nay also served as school board chairman in Wilkie. He served as agent of the Attorney General for the Wilkie Judicial Centre until 1925 and again from 1935 to 1945. In 1926, Nay was named King's Counsel. In 1946, he was named judge for the judicial district of Kerrobert. Nay was transferred to Battleford in 1949. He retired from the bench in 1950. Nay died at the Battlefords Union Hospital at the age of 90.
