= Ned Shillington =

Saskatchewan politician and Cabinet minister

The Honourable Ned Shillington ECS

Saskatchewan Cabinet Minister and Member of the Legislative Assembly of Saskatchewan
- Monarch: Elizabeth II
- Premier: Allan Blakeney (1975-1980); Roy Romanow (1991-1998)
- Lieutenant Governor: Stephen Worobetz (1975-1976); George Porteous (1976-1978); Irwin McIntosh (1978-1980); Sylvia Fedoruk (1991-1994); Jack Wiebe (1994-1998)
- Parliamentary group: Saskatchewan New Democratic Party

Member of the Legislative Assembly for Regina Centre (1975 to 1991)
- Preceded by: Allan Blakeney
- Succeeded by: Riding abolished

Member of the Legislative Assembly for Regina Northeast / Regina Churchill Downs (1991 to 1999)
- Preceded by: Ed Tchorzewski
- Succeeded by: Ron Harper

Minister of Consumer Affairs (1975 to 1976)
- Preceded by: Wes Robbins
- Succeeded by: Ed Whelan

Minister of Co-operation and Co-operative Development (1975 to 1977)
- Preceded by: Wes Robbins
- Succeeded by: Wes Robbins

Minister of Government Services (1976 to 1978)
- Preceded by: Gordon Snyder
- Succeeded by: Gordon Snyder

Minister of Culture and Youth (1977 to 1980)
- Preceded by: Ed Tchorzewski
- Succeeded by: Herman Rolfes

Minister of Education (1978 to 1979)
- Preceded by: Donald Leonard Faris
- Succeeded by: Doug McArthur

Associate Minister of Finance and Minister responsible for Crown Investments Corporation (1992, 1995)
- Preceded by: New position

Minister of Labour (1992 to 1995)
- Preceded by: Bob Mitchell
- Succeeded by: Douglas Anguish

Minister of Intergovernmental Relations (1995 to 1997)
- Preceded by: Vacant
- Succeeded by: Berny Wiens

Minister of Justice and Attorney General (1995)
- Preceded by: Bob Mitchell
- Succeeded by: Bob Mitchell

Provincial Secretary (1995 to 1998)
- Preceded by: Ed Tchorzewski
- Succeeded by: Berny Wiens

Personal details
- Born: August 28, 1944 (age 82) Moose Jaw, Saskatchewan, Canada
- Spouse: Sonia Koroscil
- Education: University of Saskatchewan
- Occupation: Consultant
- Profession: Lawyer

Edward Blaine "Ned" Shillington (born August 28, 1944, in Moose Jaw, Saskatchewan, Canada) is a lawyer, consultant and former Canadian politician. He was a member of the Saskatchewan New Democratic Party and was a member of the Legislative Assembly of Saskatchewan from 1975 to 1999. He served in the Cabinets of Premier Allan Blakeney and also Premier Roy Romanow.

== Early life ==
The son of Sterling Arthur Shillington and Dorathy Jennie Henry, Shillington studied law at the University of Saskatchewan, articled in Regina and set up practice in Moosomin. In 1970, he married Sonia Koroscil.

== Political career ==
=== First attempt ===
Shillington ran unsuccessfully as an NDP candidate in the Saskatchewan general election of 1971, in the riding of Moosimin. He was then appointed as executive assistant to the Attorney General for Saskatchewan, Roy Romanow, from 1971 to 1975.

=== Blakeney government (1975-1980) ===
He again stood for election in the general election of 1975, this time in the riding of Regina Centre, and was elected. He served in the provincial cabinet of Premier Allan Blakeney in a variety of positions, initially as Minister of Consumer Affairs. In that position, he was responsible for introducing rent control legislation, during a period of rapidly increasing residential rents. At various times, he also held the positions of Minister of Co-operation and Co-operative Development, Minister of Government Services, Minister of Culture and Youth, and Minister of Education.

=== Opposition (1982-1991) ===
Shillington left Cabinet in 1980, but continued to sit as a member of the Legislative Assembly. In the general election of 1982, when the NDP was defeated, he was one of the nine NDP members elected, and sat in the Opposition.

=== Romanow Government (1991-1998) ===
When the NDP was returned to power in 1991, Shillington was also re-elected. In the Romanow government, at various times he was the Associate Minister of Finance, the Minister of Labour, the Minister of Justice and Attorney General, the Minister of Intergovernmental Relations and the Provincial Secretary.

== Later career ==
Shillingon resigned his seat in 1999 to become a consultant, later moving to Calgary, Alberta. Rendered paraplegic, he sat on the Board of Directors of the Alberta Branch of the Canadian Paraplegic Association.
