= John Whitmore Horsman =

Canadian politician

John Whitmore Horsman (September 24, 1888 – June 10, 1976) was a farmer and political figure in Saskatchewan. He represented Wilkie from 1948 to 1964 in the Legislative Assembly of Saskatchewan as a Liberal.

He was born in Grand Falls, New Brunswick, the son of D.J. Horsman and Janet Mary Craven, and was educated there. Horsman settled on a homestead in the Unity district in 1907. In 1913, he married Elizabeth Bremner. He served on the municipal council for the rural municipality of Round Valley, serving as secretary-treasurer from 1918 to 1938 and as reeve from 1941 to 1948. Horsman also served twenty years on the local school board and was a member of the Unity Hospital board and the Saskatchewan Wheat Pool.
