= Louise Simard (politician) =

Canadian politician (born 1947)

The Honourable Louise Simard ECS KC

Member of the Legislative Assembly of Saskatchewan for Regina Hillsdale
- In office October 1, 1991 – June 21, 1995
- Preceded by: New District
- Succeeded by: District Dissolved

Member of the Legislative Assembly of Saskatchewan for Regina Lakeview
- In office October 20, 1986 – October 1, 1991
- Preceded by: Tim Embury
- Succeeded by: District Dissolved; John Nilson (indirectly)

Personal details
- Born: April 17, 1946 (age 80) Val-d'Or, Quebec
- Party: Saskatchewan New Democratic Party
- Education: University of Saskatchewan
- Profession: Lawyer

Rose Marie Louise Simard, KC (born April 17, 1947) is a lawyer, executive, and former politician in Saskatchewan, Canada. She represented Regina Lakeview (1986–91) and Regina Hillsdale (1991–95) in the Legislative Assembly of Saskatchewan as a New Democratic Party (NDP) member.

== Personal life ==
Rose Marie Louise Simard was born on 17 April 1947 in Val-d'Or, Quebec, and grew up in Meadow Lake, Saskatchewan. She is a descendant of Pierre Poitras, a member of Louis Riel’s Provisional government in what is now Manitoba. Her ancestors were active in bringing Manitoba into Confederation in 1870. She is a citizen of Métis Nation—Saskatchewan.

After receiving a BA (Philosophy) in 1969 and LLB degree (Jurisprudence Award) in 1970 from the University of Saskatchewan, Simard articled in Regina and was called to the Saskatchewan Bar in 1971.

Simard has two children, Paul and Marin, from her first marriage.

== Career ==
=== Early career ===
In 1974, Simard became the first female Legislative Counsel and Law Clerk for the province of Saskatchewan. From 1978 to 1986, Simard practised law in Regina, during which time she served as an agent of the Attorney General of Saskatchewan.

From 1978 to 1983, Simard served as Deputy Chief Commissioner of the Saskatchewan Human Rights Commission. During this time, she was also a consultant to the Government of Saskatchewan on the development of the Matrimonial Property Act, 1980, which gave equal sharing rights to spouses in a marriage, and on the amalgamation of the District Court and the Court of the Queen's Bench. From 1982 to 1985, Simard was consumer representative on the Council of the College of Physicians and Surgeons of Saskatchewan. She was one of the first public members appointed to the Medical Council of Canada (1996), and later became the first public member (i.e. non-physician) to become President of the Medical Council of Canada (2002–2003). She was also a non-medical representative on the board of directors of the Canadian Nurses Association.

=== Political career ===
Simard represented Regina Lakeview (1986–91) and Regina Hillsdale (1991–95) in the Legislative Assembly of Saskatchewan as a New Democratic Party (NDP) member. She held numerous ministerial portfolios during this period, mostly notably during her time in the Official Opposition from 1986 to 1991 as the Opposition Health Critic, as well as the critic for women's issues, SaskPower, the Saskatchewan Human Rights Commission, and the Ombudsman; and in government from 1991 to 1995 as the Minister of Health and Minister Responsible for the Status of Women (now Minister of Status of Women). At the time, Simard was only the second female lawyer to have been elected to serve in the Legislative Assembly of Saskatchewan.

As Minister of Health, she was responsible for the strategy, vision, and development leading to a complete reform and restructuring of the health care system in Saskatchewan. She introduced a "wellness" model of health care, which emphasized primary health care and population health goals, converted many small rural hospitals to health centres, and established regional health districts and boards. This was a very challenging time for the Government of Saskatchewan following the difficult financial years, near default, and scandals faced by the Grant Devine government, establishment and changes to The Established Programs Financing Act (EPF) under the Pierre Trudeau and Brian Mulroney governments that reduced federal healthcare funding transfers to the provinces, and Bill C-69 (1990) and Bill C-20 (1991) (Federal Restraint Law) that froze EPF for five years to the end of the 1994–1995 fiscal year and thereafter capped EPF increases to gross national product minus 3 per cent. Simard has been recognized as a leader in the field of health planning.

Simard oversaw numerous other ministerial portfolios while in office, including the Treasury Board, SaskTel, Wascana Centre Authority, Health Services and Utilization Commission, Saskatchewan Cancer Foundation, Health Research Board, Women's Advisory Council, Centre of the Arts, Public Service Commission, and the Mental Health Advisory Council.

=== Post-political career ===
Simard resigned from office in 1995 to return to the practice of law and was named Queen's Counsel in 1997. From 2000 to 2003, she was president and Chief Executive Officer of the Saskatchewan Association of Health Organizations (SAHO) before moving into the role of president and chief executive officer of the Health Employers Association of British Columbia. In 2002, Simard received the Commemorative Medal for the Queen's Jubilee.

Simard dedicated herself to serving on boards, including the Royal College of Physicians and Surgeons of Canada (in which she is also part of the Indigenous Committee), the Canadian Patient Safety Institute (CPSI), Canadian Health Services Research Foundation, the Canadian Institute of Health Research Chair in Nursing Human Resources, among others. Simard has also served on the Canadian Medical Association Task Force on Physician Supply in Canada and the Canadian College of Health Services Executives.

In 2010, Simard served as Professional Affiliate at the University of Saskatchewan, where she delivered a class on Health Reform at the School of Public Health She was awarded Alumni of Influence that year by the university's College of Arts and Science.

Simard is an honorary member of the Saskatchewan Registered Nurses’ Association, a past non-medical representative on the board of directors of the Canadian Nurses Association, and a life member of the Saskatchewan Lung Association. Simard is also a recipient of the 2011 Katharine Pearson Caregiver Award from the Victorian Order of Nurses.

In fall of 2018, Simard took the position of Chief Operating Officer at the Métis Nation—Saskatchewan (MN-S) where she focused on Nation-building. In the summer of 2020, Simard announced that she would be stepping away from that post.
