= Kim Trew =

Canadian politician

The Honourable Kim Trew ECS

Member of the Saskatchewan Legislative Assembly for Regina Coronation Park Regina Albert North (1991-1995) Regina North (1986-1991)
- In office October 20, 1986 – October 10, 2011
- Preceded by: Jack Klein
- Succeeded by: Mark Docherty

Personal details
- Born: June 7, 1953 (age 72) Kyle, Saskatchewan
- Party: Saskatchewan New Democratic Party

Kim Dale Trew (born June 7, 1953) is a Canadian former provincial politician. He was the Saskatchewan New Democratic Party member of the Legislative Assembly of Saskatchewan for the constituency of Regina Coronation Park from 1995 to 2011.

He was born in Kyle, Saskatchewan and educated at the University of Regina, receiving a certificate in personnel administration. In 1975, Trew married Lorna Ivy Brasseur. His grandmother, Beatrice Trew, was a founding member of the Co-operative Commonwealth Federation, the predecessor of the New Democratic Party.

Trew served as deputy speaker for the Saskatchewan assembly and was a member of the provincial cabinet, serving as Minister of Labour.

He did not run for reelection in 2011.

Kim Trew, has 8 grandchildren who all live in Saskatchewan and who visit him often. Kim Trew is a known story teller to those close to him. He spends his time playing golf and pickleball.
