= John Edwin Britton =

Canadian businessman and politician (1924–2020)

MLA for Wilkie
- In office 1986–1995
- Preceded by: Jim Garner
- Succeeded by: riding dissolved

Personal details
- Born: August 6, 1924 Unity, Saskatchewan, Canada
- Died: October 16, 2020 (aged 96) Unity, Saskatchewan, Canada
- Party: Progressive Conservative Party of Saskatchewan

John Edwin Britton (August 6, 1924 – October 16, 2020) was a Canadian businessman and politician in Saskatchewan. He represented Wilkie from 1986 to 1995 in the Legislative Assembly of Saskatchewan as a Progressive Conservative.

He was born in Unity, Saskatchewan in August 1924, the son of Thomas Martin Britton. In 1944, Britton married Amy Isabelle McLaren. Before entering provincial politics, he was a bulk fuel oil dealer.

Britton died in October 2020 at the age of 96.
