= Tom Keeping =

Canadian politician (1942–2020)

MLA for Nipawin
- In office 1991–1995

Personal details
- Born: April 12, 1942 Nipawin, Saskatchewan
- Died: June 10, 2020 (aged 78) Powell River, British Columbia
- Party: Saskatchewan New Democratic Party

Tom H. Keeping (April 12, 1942 – June 10, 2020) was a Canadian politician. He served in the Legislative Assembly of Saskatchewan from 1991 to 1995, as a NDP member for the constituency of Nipawin. He died on June 10, 2020.
