= Mark Docherty (politician) =

Canadian politician

The Honourable Mark Docherty ECS

27th Speaker of the Legislative Assembly of Saskatchewan
- In office March 12, 2018 – November 30, 2020
- Preceded by: Corey Tochor
- Succeeded by: Randy Weekes

Member of the Legislative Assembly of Saskatchewan for Regina Coronation Park
- In office November 7, 2011 – February 10, 2023
- Preceded by: Kim Trew
- Succeeded by: Noor Burki

Personal details
- Born: 1960 or 1961 (age 64–65) Regina, Saskatchewan
- Party: Saskatchewan Party
- Education: University of Regina (MSW)
- Profession: Social work

Mark Docherty is a Canadian politician, who represented the district of Regina Coronation Park in the Saskatchewan Legislative Assembly as a member of the Saskatchewan Party from 2011 to 2023. Docherty served as Speaker of the Legislative Assembly from 2018 to 2020.

== Political career ==
Docherty was first elected to the Legislative Assembly of Saskatchewan in the 2011 general election. He was re-elected in the 2016 and 2020 provincial elections.

Docherty served in Brad Wall's cabinet as Minister of Parks, Culture, and Sport from 2014 to 2016. In the 2018 leadership race to replace the retiring Wall, Docherty supported Gordon Wyant. Wyant was eliminated on the third ballot in an election won by Scott Moe.

In March 2018, Docherty was elected Speaker of the Legislative Assembly after the resignation of former Speaker Corey Tochor. Following the 2020 general election, Docherty once again stood for election as Speaker, but was defeated on the final ballot by Randy Weekes.

Docherty announced in February 2023 that he was resigning his seat in the Legislature effective February 10. Although Docherty did not explain his reasoning for resigning, ahead of summer 2023 by-elections he was vocally critical of the Saskatchewan Party's record; he stated that "People are struggling" in reference to the party's tagline, "growth that works for everyone", stating further that "It hasn't worked for everyone in Coronation Park". New Democratic Party (NDP) candidate Noor Burki won the Coronation Park by-election to replace Docherty.

In the lead-up to the 2024 general election, Docherty joined fellow former Saskatchewan Party MLA Glen Hart and former party staffer Ian Hanna in endorsing the NDP under leader Carla Beck, whose leadership qualities Docherty praised. Docherty stated that the Saskatchewan Party had "lost their way", alleging that Moe refused meetings to discuss issues. He cited the 2023 Parents' Bill of Rights as a policy designed to "subjugate people", and also related that during his time as Speaker, he felt "pressurized" to "rule in the government's favour on everything", adding on to allegations made by Weekes of being coerced in the role after taking over from Docherty.

== Personal life ==
Docherty was born and raised in Regina. He earned university degrees in Science and Human Justice, and holds a Masters of Social Work degree from the University of Regina. He spent his early career working with vulnerable youth through roles at community and youth centres. Docherty has multiple sclerosis.

== Electoral results ==
2020 Saskatchewan general election: Regina Coronation Park
Party	Candidate	Votes	%
Saskatchewan	Mark Docherty	2,913	48.87
New Democratic	Noor Burki	2,630	44.12
Progressive Conservative	David Coates	227	3.81
Green	Irene Browatzke	191	3.20
Total		5,961	100.0
Source: Elections Saskatchewan

2016 Saskatchewan general election: Regina Coronation Park
Party	Candidate	Votes	%
Saskatchewan	Mark Docherty	3,008	47.84
New Democratic	Ted Jaleta	2,861	45.51
Liberal	Tara Jijian	245	3.90
Green	Melvin Pylypchuk	103	1.64
Independent	Douglas Hudgin	70	1.11
Total		6,287	100.0
Source: Saskatchewan Archives - Election Results by Electoral Division; Elections Saskatchewan

2011 Saskatchewan general election: Regina Coronation Park
Party	Candidate	Votes	%
Saskatchewan	Mark Docherty	3,354	53.60
New Democratic	Jaime Garcia	2,756	44.04
Green	Helmi Scott	148	2.36
Total		6,258	100.0
Source: Saskatchewan Archives - Election Results by Electoral Division

== Cabinet positions ==
Saskatchewan provincial government of Brad Wall
Cabinet post (1)
Predecessor	Office	Successor
Kevin Doherty	Minister of Parks, Culture and Sport; June 5, 2014 – August 23, 2016	Ken Cheveldayoff
