= Douglas Francis McArthur =

Canadian politician

The Honourable Doug McArthur ECS

Member of the Saskatchewan Legislative Assembly for Regina Lakeview
- In office October 18, 1978 – April 26, 1982
- Preceded by: Ted Malone
- Succeeded by: Tim Embury

Personal details
- Born: June 21, 1943 (age 82) Watrous, Saskatchewan
- Party: Saskatchewan New Democratic Party
- Profession: University Professor
- Portfolio: Education, Continuing Education, Culture and Youth

Douglas Francis "Doug" McArthur (born June 21, 1943) is an educator and former political figure in Saskatchewan, Canada. He represented Regina Lakeview from 1978 to 1982 in the Legislative Assembly of Saskatchewan as a New Democratic Party (NDP) member.

He was born in Watrous, Saskatchewan, the son of Neil McArthur, and was educated at the University of Saskatchewan, the University of Toronto and Oxford University. In 1967, McArthur married Wenda Jean Berglind. He served in the Saskatchewan cabinet as Minister of Education, as Minister of Continuing Education and as Minister of Culture and Youth. McArthur was defeated by Tim Embury when he ran for reelection to the provincial assembly in 1982. After leaving politics, he served in the British Columbia public service as Deputy Minister to the Premier and Cabinet Secretary and as Deputy Minister of Aboriginal Affairs in British Columbia, in the Yukon public service as Chief Land Claims Negotiator and in the Saskatchewan public service as Deputy Minister of Agriculture and Deputy Minister of Northern Saskatchewan. McArthur was a Senior Fellow in Public Policy at the University of British Columbia. As of 2012, he was a professor in the school of Public Policy at Simon Fraser University and chair of the board of directors for the British Columbia chapter of Sierra Club Canada.
