= Harry Daniel Baker =

Canadian politician

MLA for Biggar
- In office 1982–1991

Personal details
- Born: December 13, 1937
- Died: August 20, 2025 (aged 87)
- Party: Progressive Conservative Party of Saskatchewan

Harry Daniel Baker (born 1937) was a Canadian politician. He served in the Legislative Assembly of Saskatchewan from 1982 to 1991, as a Progressive Conservative member for the constituency of Biggar.
