= List of Saskatchewan provincial electoral districts =

This is a list of provincial electoral districts in the Canadian province of Saskatchewan.

== Current electoral districts ==
- Athabasca (1934)
- Arm River (2016)
- Batoche (2003)
- Biggar-Sask Valley (2016)
- Cannington (1995)
- Canora-Pelly (1995)
- Carrot River Valley (1995)
- Cumberland (1975)
- Cut Knife-Turtleford (2003)
- Cypress Hills (1995)
- Estevan (1975)
- Humboldt-Watrous (2016)
- Indian Head-Milestone (1995)
- Kelvington-Wadena (1975)
- Kindersley (1975)
- Last Mountain-Touchwood (1975)
- Lloydminster (1995)
- Lumsden-Morse (2016)
- Martensville-Warman (2016)
- Meadow Lake (1934)
- Melfort (2003)
- Melville-Saltcoats (2003)
- Moose Jaw North (1995)
- Moose Jaw Wakamow (1991)
- Moosomin (1905)
- Prince Albert Carlton (1991)
- Prince Albert Northcote (1991)
- Regina Coronation Park (1995)
- Regina Douglas Park (2003)
- Regina Elphinstone-Centre (2003)
- Regina Gardiner Park (2016)
- Regina Lakeview (1995)
- Regina Northeast (1995)
- Regina Pasqua (2016)
- Regina Rochdale (2016)
- Regina Rosemont (2003)
- Regina University (2016)
- Regina Walsh Acres (2003)
- Regina Wascana Plains (1991)
- Rosetown-Elrose (2003)
- Rosthern-Shellbrook (2003)
- Saskatchewan Rivers (1995)
- Saskatoon Centre (2003)
- Saskatoon Churchill-Wildwood (2016)
- Saskatoon Eastview (1995)
- Saskatoon Fairview (1982)
- Saskatoon Meewasin (1995)
- Saskatoon Northwest (1995)
- Saskatoon Nutana (1975)
- Saskatoon Riversdale (1967)
- Saskatoon Silverspring-Sutherland (2016)
- Saskatoon Southeast (1991)
- Saskatoon Stonebridge-Dakota (2016)
- Saskatoon University (2016)
- Saskatoon Westview (2016)
- Saskatoon Willowgrove (2016)
- Swift Current (1908)
- The Battlefords (2003)
- Weyburn-Big Muddy (1995)
- Wood River (1995)
- Yorkton (1905)

== Former electoral districts ==
=== Provincial Ridings ===
- Arm River (1908–2003)
- Arm River-Watrous (2003–2016)
- Assiniboia-Bengough (1971–1975)
- Assiniboia-Gravelbourg (1975–1995)
- Athabasca (1908–1917)
- Batoche (1905–1908)
- Battleford (1905–1917)
- Battleford-Cut Knife (1995–2003)
- Bengough (1917–1971)
- Bengough-Milestone (1975–1995)
- Biggar (1912–1995)
- Biggar (2003–2016)
- Bromhead (1934–1938)
- Cannington (1905–1975)
- Canora (1908–1934)
- Canora (1938–1995)
- Cumberland (1912–1934)
- Cumberland (1938–1964)
- Cut Knife (1917–1964)
- Cut Knife-Lloydminster (1964–1995)
- Cypress (1917–1934)
- Duck Lake (1908–1912)
- Eagle Creek (1912–1917)
- Elrose (1917–1975)
- Estevan (1908–1934)
- Francis (1908–1938)
- Gravelbourg (1921–1975)
- Grenfell (1905–1908)
- Gull Lake (1912–1917)
- Gull Lake (1934–1952)
- Hanley (1908–1975)
- Happyland (1917–1934)
- Humboldt (1905–2016)
- Île-à-la-Crosse (1917–1934)
- Indian Head-Wolseley (1975–1995)
- Jack Fish Lake (1917–1934)
- Kelsey (1952–1971)
- Kelsey-Tisdale (1975–1995)
- Kelvington (1934–1975)
- Kerrobert (1912–1938)
- Kerrobert-Kindersley (1938–1975)
- Kindersley (1912–1938)
- Kinistino (1905–1971)
- Kinistino (1975–1995)
- Last Mountain (1908–1975)
- Lloydminster (1908–1934)
- Lumsden (1905–1908)
- Lumsden (1912–1975)
- Maple Creek (1905–1995)
- Martensville (2003–2016)
- Melfort (1912–1952)
- Melfort (1975–1995)
- Melfort-Kinistino (1971–1975)
- Melfort-Tisdale (1952–1971)
- Melfort-Tisdale (1995–2003)
- Melville (1934–2003)
- Milestone (1908–1975)
- Moose Jaw (1905–1908)
- Moose Jaw City (1905–1967)
- Moose Jaw County (1908–1938)
- Moose Jaw North (1967–1991)
- Moose Jaw Palliser (1991–1995)
- Moose Jaw South (1967–1991)
- Moose Mountain (1908–1921)
- Morse (1912–1995)
- Nipawin (1952–1995)
- North Battleford (1908–1917)
- North Battleford (1995–2003)
- North Qu'Appelle (1905–1934)
- Notukeu (1917–1938)
- Notukeu-Willow Bunch (1938–1975)
- Pelly (1908–1995)
- Pheasant Hills (1908–1938)
- Pinto Creek (1912–1917)
- Pipestone (1908–1934)
- Prince Albert (1905–1908)
- Prince Albert (1917–1967)
- Prince Albert (1975–1991)
- Prince Albert City (1905–1917)
- Prince Albert County (1908–1912)
- Prince Albert-Duck Lake (1975–1991)
- Prince Albert East (1971–1975)
- Prince Albert East-Cumberland (1967–1971)
- Prince Albert West (1967–1975)
- Qu'Appelle (1975–1982)
- Qu'Appelle-Lumsden (1982–1995)
- Qu'Appelle-Wolseley (1934–1975)
- Quill Lakes (1975–1995)
- Quill Plains (1912–1917)
- Redberry (1905–1934)
- Redberry (1938–1995)
- Redberry Lake (1995–2003)
- Regina Albert North (1991–1995)
- Regina Albert Park (1971–1975)
- Regina Albert South (1991–1995)
- Regina Centre (1967–1991)
- Regina Centre (1995–2003)
- Regina Dewdney (1991–2016)
- Regina Churchill Downs (1991–1995)
- Regina City (1905–1964)
- Regina County (1908–1912)
- Regina East (1964–1967)
- Regina Elphinstone (1975–2003)
- Regina Hillsdale (1991–1995)
- Regina Lake Centre (1991–1995)
- Regina Lakeview (1971–1991)
- Regina North (1964–1967)
- Regina North (1982–1991)
- Regina North East (1967–1991)
- Regina North West (1967–1995)
- Regina Qu'Appelle Valley (1995–2016)
- Regina Rosemont (1975–1995)
- Regina Sherwood (1995–2003)
- Regina South (1964–1971)
- Regina South (1975–1991)
- Regina South (1995–2016)
- Regina South East (1967–1971)
- Regina South West (1967–1971)
- Regina Victoria (1975–2003)
- Regina Wascana (1971–1991)
- Regina West (1964–1967)
- Regina Whitmore Park (1971–1975)
- Rosetown (1912–1975)
- Rosetown-Biggar (1995–2003)
- Rosetown-Elrose (1975–1995)
- Rosthern (1905–2003)
- Saltcoats (1905–1934)
- Saltcoats (1938–2003)
- Saskatoon (1905–1908)
- Saskatoon Broadway (1991–1995)
- Saskatoon Buena Vista (1975–1982)
- Saskatoon Centre (1975–1991)
- Saskatoon City (1908–1967)
- Saskatoon City Park (1971–1975)
- Saskatoon City Park-University (1967–1971)
- Saskatoon County (1908–1934)
- Saskatoon Eastview (1975–1991)
- Saskatoon Eastview-Haultain (1991–1995)
- Saskatoon Idylwyld (1991–2003)
- Saskatoon Greystone (1991–2016)
- Saskatoon Massey Place (2003–2016)
- Saskatoon Mayfair (1967–1991)
- Saskatoon Mount Royal (1995–2003)
- Saskatoon Nutana Centre (1967–1975)
- Saskatoon Nutana South (1967–1975)
- Saskatoon River Heights (1991–1995)
- Saskatoon Silver Springs (2003–2016)
- Saskatoon South (1982–1991)
- Saskatoon Sutherland (1975–1991)
- Saskatoon Sutherland (1995–2016)
- Saskatoon Sutherland-University (1991–1995)
- Saskatoon University (1971–1975)
- Saskatoon University (1982–1991)
- Saskatoon Westmount (1975–1995)
- Saskatoon Wildwood (1991–1995)
- Shaunavon (1934–1938)
- Shaunavon (1952–1995)
- Shellbrook (1912–1982)
- Shellbrook-Spiritwood (1995–2003)
- Shellbrook-Torch River (1982–1995)
- Souris (1905–1934)
- Souris-Cannington (1975–1995)
- Souris-Estevan (1934–1975)
- South Qu'Appelle (1905–1934)
- South Regina (1905–1908)
- The Battlefords (1917–1995)
- Thunder Creek (1912–1938)
- Thunder Creek (1975–2016)
- Tisdale (1917–1952)
- Tisdale-Kelsey (1971–1975)
- Torch River (1938–1952)
- Touchwood (1908–1975)
- Tramping Lake (1912–1917)
- Turtleford (1917–1995)
- Vonda (1908–1934)
- Wadena (1908–1975)
- Watrous (1934–1975)
- Watrous (1995–2003)
- Weyburn (1908–1995)
- Whitewood (1905–1908)
- Wilkie (1917–1995)
- Willow Bunch (1912–1938)
- Wolseley (1905–1908)
- Wolseley (1921–1934)
- Wynyard (1917–1934)

=== Active Service Voters ===
- Active Service Voters (1917–1921)
  - France and Belgium
  - Great Britain
- Active Service Voters (1944–1948)
  - Area No. 1 (Great Britain)
  - Area No. 2 (Countries bordering on the Mediterranean Sea)
  - Area No. 3 (Canada outside of Saskatchewan or in Newfoundland)

== See also ==
- Electoral district (Canada)
- Canadian provincial electoral districts
- List of Saskatchewan general elections
