= 26th Saskatchewan Legislature =

The 26th Legislative Assembly of Saskatchewan was elected in the 2007 Saskatchewan election, and was sworn in on November 21, 2007. It sat until May 19, 2011. It was controlled by the Saskatchewan Party under Premier Brad Wall.

== Members ==
Member	Party	District	First elected / previously elected	No.# of term(s)
Greg Brkich	Saskatchewan Party	Arm River-Watrous	1999	3rd term
Buckley Belanger	New Democratic	Athabasca	1995 (Note: First elected as a Liberal)	4th term
Delbert Kirsch	Saskatchewan Party	Batoche	2003	2nd term
Randy Weekes	Saskatchewan Party	Biggar	1999	3rd term
Dan D'Autremont	Saskatchewan Party	Cannington	1991 (Note: First elected as a Progressive Conservative)	5th term
Ken Krawetz	Saskatchewan Party	Canora-Pelly	1995	4th term
Fred Bradshaw	Saskatchewan Party	Carrot River Valley	2007	1st term
Joan Beatty (Until January 3, 2008)	New Democratic	Cumberland	2003	2nd term
Doyle Vermette (From June 25, 2008)	New Democratic	Cumberland	2008	1st term
Michael Chisholm	Saskatchewan Party	Cut Knife-Turtleford	2003	2nd term
Wayne Elhard	Saskatchewan Party	Cypress Hills	1999	4th term
Doreen Eagles	Saskatchewan Party	Estevan	1999	3rd term
Donna Harpauer	Saskatchewan Party	Humboldt	1999	3rd term
Don McMorris	Saskatchewan Party	Indian Head-Milestone	1999	3rd term
June Draude	Saskatchewan Party	Kelvington-Wadena	1995	4th term
Bill Boyd	Saskatchewan Party	Kindersley	1991, 2007	4th term*
Glen Hart	Saskatchewan Party	Last Mountain-Touchwood	1999	3rd term
Tim McMillan	Saskatchewan Party	Lloydminster	2007	1st term
Nancy Heppner	Saskatchewan Party	Martensville	2007	2nd term
Jeremy Harrison	Saskatchewan Party	Meadow Lake	2007	1st term
Rod Gantefoer	Saskatchewan Party	Melfort	1995	4th term
Bob Bjornerud	Saskatchewan Party	Melville-Saltcoats	1995	4th term
Warren Michelson	Saskatchewan Party	Moose Jaw North	2007	1st term
Deb Higgins	New Democratic	Moose Jaw Wakamow	1999	3rd term
Don Toth	Saskatchewan Party	Moosomin	1986	6th term
Darryl Hickie	Saskatchewan Party	Prince Albert Carlton	2007	1st term
Darcy Furber	New Democratic	Prince Albert Northcote	2007	1st term
Kim Trew	New Democratic	Regina Coronation Park	1986	6th term
Kevin Yates	New Democratic	Regina Dewdney	1999	4th term
Harry Van Mulligen (Until June 8, 2009)	New Democratic	Regina Douglas Park	1986	6th term
Dwain Lingenfelter (From September 21, 2009)	New Democratic	Regina Douglas Park	1978, (Note: Shaunavon) 1988, (Note: Regina Elphinstone) 2009	7th term*
Warren McCall	New Democratic	Regina Elphinstone-Centre	2001	3rd term
John Nilson	New Democratic	Regina Lakeview	1995	4th term
Ron Harper	New Democratic	Regina Northeast	1991, (Note: Pelly) 1999	4th term*
Laura Ross	Saskatchewan Party	Regina Qu'Appelle Valley	2007	1st term
Trent Wotherspoon	New Democratic	Regina Rosemont	2007	1st term
Bill Hutchinson	Saskatchewan Party	Regina South	2007	1st term
Sandra Morin	New Democratic	Regina Walsh Acres	2003	2nd term
Christine Tell	Saskatchewan Party	Regina Wascana Plains	2007	1st term
Jim Reiter	Saskatchewan Party	Rosetown-Elrose	2007	1st term
Denis Allchurch	Saskatchewan Party	Rosthern-Shellbrook	1999	3rd term
Nadine Wilson	Saskatchewan Party	Saskatchewan Rivers	2007	1st term
David Forbes	New Democratic	Saskatoon Centre	2001	3rd term
Judy Junor	New Democratic	Saskatoon Eastview	1998	4th term
Andy Iwanchuk	New Democratic	Saskatoon Fairview	2003	3rd term
Rob Norris	Saskatchewan Party	Saskatoon Greystone	2007	1st term
Cam Broten	New Democratic	Saskatoon Massey Place	2007	1st term
Frank Quennell	New Democratic	Saskatoon Meewasin	2003	2nd term
Serge LeClerc (Until August 31, 2010)	Saskatchewan Party	Saskatoon Northwest	2007	1st term
Serge LeClerc (Until August 31, 2010)	Independent	Saskatoon Northwest	2007	1st term
Gordon Wyant (From October 18, 2010)	Saskatchewan Party	Saskatoon Northwest	2010	1st term
Pat Atkinson	New Democratic	Saskatoon Nutana	1986	6th term
Lorne Calvert (Until June 30, 2009)	New Democratic	Saskatoon Riversdale	1986, (Note: Moose Jaw Wakamow) 2001	6th term*
Danielle Chartier (From September 21, 2009)	New Democratic	Saskatoon Riversdale	2009	1st term
Ken Cheveldayoff	Saskatchewan Party	Saskatoon Silver Springs	2003	2nd term
Don Morgan	Saskatchewan Party	Saskatoon Southeast	2003	2nd term
Joceline Schriemer	Saskatchewan Party	Saskatoon Sutherland	2007	1st term
Brad Wall	Saskatchewan Party	Swift Current	1999	3rd term
Len Taylor	New Democratic	The Battlefords	2003	2nd term
Lyle Stewart	Saskatchewan Party	Thunder Creek	1999	3rd term
Dustin Duncan	Saskatchewan Party	Weyburn-Big Muddy	2006	2nd term
Yogi Huyghebaert	Saskatchewan Party	Wood River	2000	3rd term
Greg Ottenbreit	Saskatchewan Party	Yorkton	2007	1st term

== Standings changes since the 26th general election ==
Number of members per party by date	2007	2008		2009			2010		
Number of members per party by date	Oct 10	Jan 3	Jun 25	Jun 8	Jun 30	Sep 21	Apr 16	Aug 31	Oct 18
Saskatchewan Party	38						37		38
New Democratic	20	19	20	19	18	20			
Independent	0						1	0	
Total Members	58	57	58	57	56	58		57	58
Vacant	0	1	0	1	2	0		1	0
Government Majority	18	19	18	19	20	18	16	17	18

Membership changes in the 26th Assembly
Date	Name	District	Party	Reason
October 10, 2007	See List of Members			Election day of the 26th Saskatchewan general election
January 3, 2008	Joan Beatty	Cumberland	New Democratic	Resigned to run in a federal by-election
June 25, 2008	Doyle Vermette	Cumberland	New Democratic	Elected in a by-election
June 8, 2009	Harry Van Mulligen	Regina Douglas Park	New Democratic	Resigned seat
June 30, 2009	Lorne Calvert	Saskatoon Riversdale	New Democratic	Resigned seat
September 21, 2009	Danielle Chartier	Saskatoon Riversdale	New Democratic	Elected in a by-election
September 21, 2009	Dwain Lingenfelter	Regina Douglas Park	New Democratic	Elected in a by-election
April 16, 2010	Serge LeClerc	Saskatoon Northwest	Independent	Left the Saskatchewan Party caucus
August 31, 2010	Serge LeClerc	Saskatoon Northwest	Independent	Resigned Seat
October 18, 2010	Gordon Wyant	Saskatoon Northwest	Saskatchewan Party	Elected in a by-election
