= 25th Saskatchewan Legislature =

The 25th Legislative Assembly of Saskatchewan was in power from 2003 until November 20, 2007. It was controlled by the Saskatchewan New Democratic Party under premier Lorne Calvert.

== Members ==
Member	Party	District	First elected / previously elected	No.# of term(s)
Greg P. Brkich	Saskatchewan Party	Arm River-Watrous	1999	2nd term
Buckley Belanger	NDP	Athabasca	1995 (Note: First elected as a Liberal)	3rd term
Delbert Kirsch	Saskatchewan Party	Batoche	2003	1st term
Randy Weekes	Saskatchewan Party	Biggar	1999	2nd term
Dan D'Autremont	Saskatchewan Party	Cannington	1991 (Note: First elected as a Progressive Conservative)	4th term
Ken Krawetz	Saskatchewan Party	Canora-Pelly	1995	3rd term
Allan Kerpan	Saskatchewan Party	Carrot River Valley	2003	2nd term
Joan Beatty	NDP	Cumberland	2003	1st term
Michael Chisholm	Saskatchewan Party	Cut Knife-Turtleford	2003	1st term
Wayne Elhard	Saskatchewan Party	Cypress Hills	1999	3rd term
Doreen Eagles	Saskatchewan Party	Estevan	1999	2nd term
Donna Harpauer	Saskatchewan Party	Humboldt	1999	2nd term
Don McMorris	Saskatchewan Party	Indian Head-Milestone	1999	2nd term
June Draude	Saskatchewan Party	Kelvington-Wadena	1995	3rd term
Jason Dearborn	Saskatchewan Party	Kindersley	2002	2nd term
Glen Hart	Saskatchewan Party	Last Mountain-Touchwood	1999	2nd term
Milton Wakefield	Saskatchewan Party	Lloydminster	1999	2nd term
Ben Heppner ^{2}	Saskatchewan Party	Martensville	1995	3rd term
Nancy Heppner (2007)^{2}	Saskatchewan Party	Martensville	2007	1st term
Maynard Sonntag	NDP	Meadow Lake	1991	4th term
Rod Gantefoer	Saskatchewan Party	Melfort	1995	3rd term
Bob Bjornerud	Saskatchewan Party	Melville-Saltcoats	1995	3rd term
Glenn Hagel	NDP	Moose Jaw North	1986	5th term
Deb Higgins	NDP	Moose Jaw Wakamow	1999	2nd term
Don Toth	Saskatchewan Party	Moosomin	1986	5th term
Myron Kowalsky†	NDP	Prince Albert Carlton	1986	5th term
Eldon Lautermilch	NDP	Prince Albert Northcote	1986	5th term
Kim Trew	NDP	Regina Coronation Park	1986	5th term
Kevin Yates	NDP	Regina Dewdney	1999	3rd term
Harry Van Mulligen	NDP	Regina Douglas Park	1986	5th term
Warren McCall	NDP	Regina Elphinstone-Centre	2001	2nd term
John Nilson	NDP	Regina Lakeview	1995	3rd term
Ron Harper	NDP	Regina Northeast	1991, (Note: Pelly) 1999	3rd term*
Mark Wartman	NDP	Regina Qu'Appelle Valley	1999	2nd term
Joanne Crofford	NDP	Regina Rosemont	1991	4th term
Andrew Thomson	NDP	Regina South	1995	3rd term
Sandra Morin	NDP	Regina Walsh Acres	2003	1st term
Doreen Hamilton	NDP	Regina Wascana Plains	1991	4th term
Elwin Hermanson	Saskatchewan Party	Rosetown-Elrose	1999	2nd term
Denis Allchurch	Saskatchewan Party	Rosthern-Shellbrook	1999	2nd term
Lon Borgerson	NDP	Saskatchewan Rivers	2003	1st term
David Forbes	NDP	Saskatoon Centre	2001	2nd term
Judy Junor	NDP	Saskatoon Eastview	1998	3rd term
Andy Iwanchuk	NDP	Saskatoon Fairview	2003	2nd term
Peter Prebble	NDP	Saskatoon Greystone	1978, (Note: Saskatoon Sutherland) 1986, (Note: Saskatoon University) 1999	4th term*
Eric Cline	NDP	Saskatoon Massey Place	1991	4th term
Frank Quennell	NDP	Saskatoon Meewasin	2003	1st term
Ted Merriman	Saskatchewan Party	Saskatoon Northwest	2003	1st term
Pat Atkinson	NDP	Saskatoon Nutana	1986	5th term
Lorne Calvert	NDP	Saskatoon Riversdale	1986, (Note: Moose Jaw Wakamow) 2001	5th term*
Ken Cheveldayoff	Saskatchewan Party	Saskatoon Silver Springs	2003	1st term
Don Morgan	Saskatchewan Party	Saskatoon Southeast	2003	1st term
Graham Addley	NDP	Saskatoon Sutherland	1999	2nd term
Brad Wall	Saskatchewan Party	Swift Current	1999	2nd term
Len Taylor	NDP	The Battlefords	2003	1st term
Lyle Stewart	Saskatchewan Party	Thunder Creek	1999	2nd term
Brenda Bakken-Lackey ^{1}	Saskatchewan Party	Weyburn-Big Muddy	1999	2nd term
Dustin Duncan (2006) ^{1}	Saskatchewan Party	Weyburn-Big Muddy	2006	1st term
Yogi Huyghebaert	Saskatchewan Party	Wood River	2000	2nd term
Clay Serby	NDP	Yorkton	1991	4th term

=== By-elections ===
1. The member for Weyburn-Big Muddy, Brenda Bakken-Lackey, resigned in February 2006. On May 19, 2006, Premier Lorne Calvert called a by-election for June 19, 2006. The by-election was won by Dustin Duncan of the Saskatchewan Party.
2. The member for Martensville, Ben Heppner, died on September 24, 2006. A by-election was held on March 5, 2007. The by-election was won by Nancy Heppner, Ben's daughter, of the Saskatchewan Party.

== Party standings ==
****	*	*	*	*	****	****	*	****	****	*	****	****	*	****	****
****	*	****	****	*	****	****	*	****	****	*	****	****	*	****	****
****	*	****	****	*	****	****	*	****	****	*	****	****	*	****	****
****
****
****
****	*	****	****	*	****	****	*	****	****	*	****	****	*	****	****	*	****
****	*	****	****	*	****	****	*	****	****	*	****	****	*	****	****
****	*	****	****	*	****	****	*	****	****	*	****	****	*	****	****

Seating Plan
Official Seating Plan (pdf format)

Affiliation	Members
New Democratic Party	30
Saskatchewan Party	28
Total	58
Government Majority (including the Speaker)	1
