= 2025–26 SJHL season =

58th season of the Saskatchewan Junior Hockey League

- League: SJHL
- Sport: Junior ice hockey
- Duration: Pre-season; August–September; Regular season September–March; Post-season; March–April
- Games: 336
- Teams: 12
- Total attendance: 258,943
- Streaming partner: FloSports

2025 Draft
- Top draft pick: Camryn Aebig
- Picked by: Warman Wolverines

Championship
- Canterra Seeds Cup: Flin Flon Bombers
- Runners-up: Yorkton Terriers
- Season MVP: Ewan Rennie
- Top scorer: Ewan Rennie

SJHL seasons
- ← 2024–25 2026–27 →

The 2025–26 SJHL season is the 58th season of the Saskatchewan Junior Hockey League (SJHL).

The franchise formerly known as the Notre Dame Hounds relocated from Wilcox to Warman and was rebranded as the Warman Wolverines following a change in ownership.

The league's North Division (comprising the Flin Flon Bombers, La Ronge Ice Wolves, Melfort Mustangs and Nipawin Hawks) was renamed the UPL North Division, pursuant to a 3-year sponsorship agreement with UPL Corp. The South Division (comprising the Estevan Bruins, Melville Millionaires, Weyburn Red Wings, and Yorkton Terriers) was renamed the Bunge Division following the corporate merger between the title sponsor Viterra and Bunge Global. The Central Division (comprising the Battlefords North Stars, Humboldt Broncos, Kindersley Klippers, and Warman Wolverines) was branded as the Nutrien Division, after its title sponsor Nutrien, in 2023.

The following rule changes were adopted under the expanded Western Canadian Development Model (WCDM) pilot project:

- Western Junior A teams will be permitted to register up to five U.S.-born players at one time on their active roster, a decrease from the previous six.
- 16- and 17-year-old U.S.-born players who have been drafted, listed or signed by a WHL team will be eligible to be rostered by any Western Junior A team.
- Each Western Junior A team will be eligible to roster one 16- or 17-year-old player whose parent(s) reside(s) outside of their province or region, if the player has been drafted, listed or signed by a WHL team
  - Up to a maximum of 23 such players across all Western Junior A teams, or one player from each WHL team.
- Out-of-province players who participate in the Canadian Sport School Hockey League (CSSHL) will be eligible to affiliate with Western Junior A teams in their school's respective province or region.
- No more than eight players born in a province not participating in the WCDM may be registered on the active roster of a Western Junior A team.

The WCDM pilot project began in 2024–25 across Western Canada.

== Regular season ==
The regular season ran from September–March. Each team played 56 games, including 8 against teams in their division and 4 against teams in other divisions. The top 8 teams overall advanced to the playoffs.

Standings
Rank	Team	GP	W	L	OTL	SOL	Pts
1	Flin Flon Bombers	56	41	11	3	1	86
2	Yorkton Terriers	56	37	17	1	1	76
3	Battlefords North Stars	56	35	15	4	2	76
4	Nipawin Hawks	56	35	19	1	1	72
5	Weyburn Red Wings	56	34	18	1	3	72
6	Melfort Mustangs	56	30	22	2	2	64
7	Melville Millionaires	56	25	21	5	5	60
8	Estevan Bruins	56	26	25	4	1	57
9	Humboldt Broncos	56	26	26	3	1	56
10	Kindersley Klippers	56	22	25	3	6	53
11	Warman Wolverines	56	14	36	3	3	34
12	La Ronge Ice Wolves	56	11	40	4	1	27

Source: "2025–26 SJHL standings". hockeydb.com.

== Post-season ==
2026 SJHL playoffs
Canterra Seeds Cup

Tournament details
- Dates: March – April
- Teams: 8

Final positions
- Champions: Flin Flon Bombers
- Runners-up: Yorkton Terriers
- Semifinalists: Weyburn Red Wings; Battlefords North Stars

Tournament statistics
- Games played: 39
- Goals scored: 236 (6.05 per game)
- Attendance: 48,921 (1,254 per game)

Official website
- 2026 SJHL playoffs

The top 8 teams overall in the regular season advanced to the quarterfinals. The winners in each round are determined by a single-elimination best-of-seven series. The winners advanced to the national championship tournament.

Quarterfinals
Flin Flon	4
Estevan	0
Nipawin	2
Weyburn	4
Battlefords	4
Melfort	1
Yorkton	4
Melville	2

Semifinals
Flin Flon	4
Weyburn	3
Battlefords	3
Yorkton	4

Finals
Flin Flon	4
Yorkton	0

Source: "2025–26 SJHL playoff results". sjhl.ca.

== Individual awards ==
Estevan Bruins forward Ewan Rennie was named the league's Most Valuable Player and Forward of the Year. Thomas Ries of the Yorkton Terriers was named Defenceman of the Year and Charlie Tritt of the Flin Flon Bombers was the league's Goaltender of the Year.

== Sources ==
- Shire, Taylor (22 February 2025). "Deep dive into why the Notre Dame Hounds are giving up Jr. A hockey". paherald.sk.ca. Regina Leader-Post.
- Weyland, Blaine (10 March 2025). "The Notre Dame Hounds will become the Warman Wolverines next season". discoverhumboldt.com.
- "CJHL announces leadership reappointments and major policy advancements at AGM". cjhlhockey.com. Canadian Junior Hockey League. 16 May 2025.
- "Warman Wolverines confident in support as decision on final approval looms". 980 CJME. 25 May 2025.
- Walchuk, Benny (29 May 2025). "2025 SJHL draft day set for June 10". SaskToday.ca. Harvard Media.
- "Harvard Media wins gold for Yorkton's Save the Terriers campaign". SaskToday.ca. Harvard Media. 31 May 2025.
- "Top 10 SJHL Draft Picks of all time". sjhl.ca. Saskatchewan Junior Hockey League. 4 June 2025.
- Walchuk, Benny (7 June 2025). "Warman Wolverines officially approved for 2025–26 SJHL season". SaskToday.ca. Harvard Media.
- "Warman Wolverines officially newest team in SJHL". 650 CKOM. 8 June 2025.
- Walchuk, Benny (10 June 2025). "SPORTS SCOPE: talent meets opportunity at 2025 SJHL draft". SaskToday.ca. Harvard Media.
- Tompkins, Ben (10 June 2025). "Ninety-two players selected in 2025 SJHL Draft". northeastNOW. Pattison Media.
- "Wolverines make first ever SJHL draft pick". CTV News. Bell Media. 11 June 2025.
- Douglas, Cooper (25 June 2025). "Wolverines and October home games lead Klippers' 2025–26 slate". WestCentralOnline.
- Walchuk, Benny (25 June 2025). "Saskatchewan Junior Hockey League releases 2025/26 schedule". SaskToday.ca. Harvard Media.
- Walchuk, Benny (11 August 2025). "Saskatchewan Junior Hockey League announces 2025 pre-season slate". SportsCage.com. Harvard Media.
- Quon, Alexander (3 July 2025). "$8.2B US merger of Viterra and Bunge now complete". CBC News. CBC/Radio-Canada.
- "MJHL, SJHL announce Western All-Star Challenge". mjhlhockey.ca (Press release). Winnipeg, MB: Manitoba Junior Hockey League. 25 September 2025.
- Douglas, Cooper (6 November 2025). "SJHL falls to MJHL in final All-Star Challenge game in Martensville". WestCentralOnline.com.
- Walchuk, Benny (6 November 2025). "MJHL rallies late to defeat SJHL in Western All Star Challenge finale". SaskToday.ca. Harvard Media.
- "MJHL splits Western All-Star Challenge". mjhlhockey.ca. Martensville, SK: Manitoba Junior Hockey League. 6 November 2025.
- Dankochik, Cassidy (6 November 2025). "MJHL's top players aiming for spot on Team Canada". The Carillon.
