= Lawson Heights Urban Centre, Saskatoon =

Lawson Heights Urban Centre
- Neighbourhood
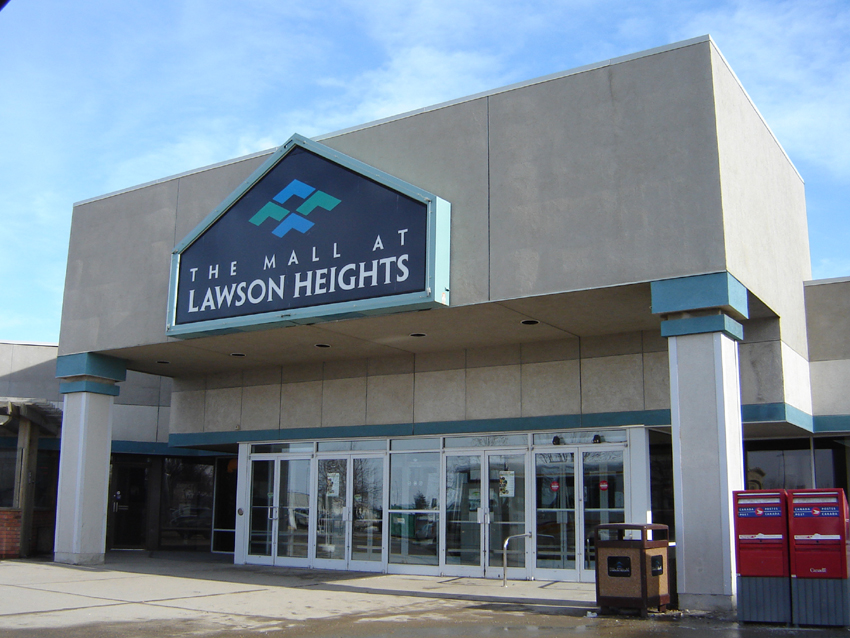
- Lawson Heights Mall (formerly The Mall at Lawson Heights)
- Interactive map of Lawson Heights Urban Centre
- Coordinates: 52°10′12″N 106°38′6″W
- Country: Canada
- Province: Saskatchewan
- City: Saskatoon
- Sector: Lawson

Government
  - Type: Municipal (Ward 5)
  - Administrative body: Saskatoon City Council
  - Councillor: Randy Donauer

Area
  - Total: 1.485 km^{2} (0.573 sq mi)

Population (2022)
  - Total: 1,550
  - Density: 1,040/km^{2} (2,700/sq mi)
- Time zone: UTC-6 (CST)

Lawson Heights Urban Centre, previously known as Lawson Heights Suburban Centre, is a neighbourhood that is maturing, and is located in north west Saskatoon. The neighbourhood features high density residential areas, major commercial suburban development area centre, transit mall, large green space parks which are slated for upgrade, and secondary institution. It is situated just east of the Riel Industrial Sector and near the South Saskatchewan River Lawson Heights Urban Centre combines a proximity to amenities offered by a comprehensive industrial development and the scenic river and river bank park system.

== Location ==
Within the Lawson Sector (West Side) is the neighbourhood of Lawson Heights Urban Centre. With Saguenay Drive to the east for a short strip. This SC widens out in a triangular shape with La Ronge Road to the south, not including St. Anne's School, Primrose Drive continues on the south side. Warman Road or the Canadian National Railway line comprises the westernmost border. Pinehouse Drive and Lenore Drive comprise the northern border. Bishop James Mahoney School and Bishop James P. Mahoney Park are part of the Lawson Heights Urban Centre.

== Shopping ==
Lawson Heights Mall at the intersection of Warman Road and Primrose Drive is the community's primary commercial hub. Built in the early 1980s, it was notable for being the first Saskatoon mall to feature a food court (all of the city's other malls later added ones of their own). The area also has an assortment of standalone and strip-mall commercial development.

== Layout ==
Bishop James Mahoney High School and Bishop James Park comprises the eastern border of the neighbourhood along Primrose Drive. A shopping mall complex, several satellite shopping strip malls, Lawson Civic Centre, high school, parks, apartments and condominiums are nestled within a residential neighbourhood set out in a court system layout. Bethany Tower, Bethany Villa and Primrose Chateau are senior's residences located in the Lawson Heights Urban Centre.

== Government and politics ==
Lawson Heights Urban Centre exists within the federal electoral district of Saskatoon—University. It is currently represented by Corey Tochor of the Conservative Party of Canada, first elected in 2019.

Provincially, the area is divided by Primrose Drive and Pinehouse Drive into two constituencies. The southeastern portion lies within the constituency of Saskatoon Meewasin. It is currently represented by Ryan Meili of the Saskatchewan New Democratic Party, first elected in a 2017 by-election. The northwestern portion lies within the constituency of Saskatoon Northwest. It is currently represented by Gordon Wyant of the Saskatchewan Party, first elected in a 2010 by-election.

In Saskatoon's non-partisan municipal politics, Lawson Heights Urban Centre lies within ward 5. It is currently represented by Randy Donauer, first elected in 2010.

== Recreation ==
- Saskatoon Kinsmen / Henk Ruys Soccer Centre.
- Lawson Civic Centre opened in 1989 in conjunction with the
  - Saskatoon's first wave pool
  - Tropical beach like pool where the water starts at 0 and tapers off until finally reaching a depth of 6 feet (2 metres).
  - Water Features such as whirl pool, and toddler's pool
  - Multipurpose Room
  - Indoor Playground
  - Fitness Room
  - Poolside Deck
  - Outdoor Park area.
- Scale Solar System model

== Library ==
- Rusty MacDonald Branch Library located in the Lawson Civic Centre celebrated its grand opening in 1989.

== Education ==
- Bishop James Mahoney High School

== Area Parks ==
- Bishop James P. Mahoney Park
- Umea Park
- Umea Vast Park - slated for upgrade

== Transportation ==
=== City Transit ===
Lawson Heights Urban Centre serviced by a Saskatoon Transit Bus Terminal Mall.
