= Saskatoon Soccer Centre =

Soccer facility in Saskatoon, Saskatchewan

SaskTel Sports Centre Outdoor Fields
- Address: 150 Nelson Road (Saskatoon Sports Centre); 219 Primrose Drive (Saskatoon Kinsmen)
- Location: Saskatoon, Saskatchewan, Canada
- Capacity: 256 (Saskatoon Kinsmen); 1,500 (Saskatoon Sports Centre)
- Surface: Artificial turf

Saskatoon Soccer Centre Inc. (SSCI) is a soccer facility located in Saskatoon, Saskatchewan. It has two facilities:

- Saskatoon Sports Centre (outdoor soccer, located at 150 Nelson Road)
- Kinsmen/Henk Ruys Centre (indoor soccer, located at 219 Primrose Drive, in the Lawson Heights neighbourhood)

== Overview ==
SSCI was registered as a non-profit organization in 1993 to bring a permanent indoor soccer facility to the city of Saskatoon. The Kinsmen/Henk Ruys was completed first and opened in the winter of 1998. The facility has four full size indoor soccer fields and is also used frequently for volleyball, box lacrosse, dodgeball, and roller hockey.

With the growth of soccer in Saskatoon, a second facility was needed and the Saskatoon Soccer Centre was opened in the fall of 2006. It was built in conjunction with Centennial Collegiate. This facility has two full size outdoor fields and indoors has a full size field as well as two hardcore titled fields. The indoor soccer field is the largest indoor soccer field in Canada.
