= Warman (provincial electoral district) =

Saskatchewan electoral district

Provincial electoral district
- Legislature: Legislative Assembly of Saskatchewan
MLA
Terry Jenson
Saskatchewan
- District created: 2022
- First contested: 30th

Demographics
- Electors: 13,682
- Area (km²): 1,349.6
- Region: Saskatoon metropolitan area
- Communities: Warman, Hague, Hepburn, Osler

Warman is a provincial electoral district for the Legislative Assembly of Saskatchewan, Canada.

The riding was created by redistribution in 2022, taking territory from Martensville-Warman and Biggar-Sask Valley. Named after the city of Warman, which is in turn named for journalist Cy Warman, this riding was first contested in the 30th Saskatchewan general election. The majority of the population lives in the aforementioned city, but it also includes the towns of Hague, Hepburn, and Osler.

== Election results ==
2024 Saskatchewan general election
Party	Candidate	Votes	%	±%
Saskatchewan	Terry Jenson	5,927	65.56	-11.14
New Democratic	Erica Baerwald	2,286	25.29	+10.49
Saskatchewan United	Andrea Early	650	7.19	–
Buffalo	Mark Friesen	125	1.38	-5.42
Green	Adriana Hackl Pinno	52	0.58	-1.12
Total valid votes		9,040	99.52	
Total rejected ballots		44	0.48	
Turnout		9,084	64.16	
Eligible voters		14,158		
Saskatchewan hold		Swing		
Source: Elections Saskatchewan

=== 2020 redistributed results ===
2020 provincial election redistributed results
Party	%
Saskatchewan	76.7
New Democratic	14.8
Buffalo	6.8
Green	1.7
