= Warman station =

Railway station in Saskatchewan, Canada

Warman

General information
- Location: 422 Peters Street; Warman, Saskatchewan
- Coordinates: 52.319838°N 106.582778°W
- Line: Canadian National Railway
- Connections: Canadian Pacific Railway

History
- Opened: 1907
- Closed: 1942
Location

The Warman station is a former railway station in Warman, Saskatchewan. It was built by the Canadian Northern Railway along the east-west Canadian Northern Railway line (running from Humboldt to North Battleford) at the intersection with the Canadian Pacific Railway north–south line (running from Regina to Prince Albert). The 1 1/2-storey, stucco-clad, wood-frame train station, was originally located at the intersection of two railway lines. The station building was moved to its current location in 1942 when its use as a station was discontinued; the building is now used as a seniors drop in centre. The building was designated a Municipal Heritage Property in 2004.

The original name of the town was Diamond, because the crossing of the two railway lines created a diamond shape. Soon the name of the town site was changed to Warman, named after Cy Warman (1855–1914), a journalist who followed and recorded the construction of the Canadian National Railway.
