= 2026–27 SJHL season =

59th year of the SJHL

- League: SJHL
- Sport: Junior ice hockey
- Duration: Pre-season; August–September; Regular season September–March; Post-season; March–April
- Games: 336
- Teams: 12
- Streaming partner: FloSports

SJHL seasons
- ← 2025–26 2027–28 →

The 2026–27 season is the 59th year of the Saskatchewan Junior Hockey League (SJHL).

The regular season runs from September–March. Each team plays 56 games, including 8 against teams in their division and 4 against teams in other divisions. The top 8 teams overall advanced to the playoffs.

The La Ronge Ice Wolves appointed Taylor Harnett as head coach and Bob Beatty as general manager.

Jordan Szczecinski, assistant coach of the Weyburn Red Wings, became the first woman coach in SJHL history.

== Sources ==
- "Playoff Format". sjhl.ca. Saskatchewan Junior Hockey League.
- Maess, Donovan (27 April 2026). "La Ronge Ice Wolves part ways with head coach". CTVNews. Bell Media.
- Tompkins, Ben (19 May 2026). "Beatty staying on as Ice Wolves GM". panow.com. Pattison Media.
- Weyland, Blaine (19 May 2026). "Bob Beatty returns to La Ronge as General Manager for Ice Wolves". DiscoverHumboldt.
- Cornet, Derek (3 June 2026). "New coach for La Ronge Ice Wolves". larongeNOW. Pattison Media.
- Davenport, Cole (10 June 2026). "Duke Lesnar among Yorkton Terriers draft class". CTVNews. Bell Media.
- Fiessel, Dylan (12 August 2026). "Weyburn Red Wings look to build off successful season: AGM Recap". DiscoverWeyburn.
- Walchuk, Benny (25 August 2026). "SJHL's Yorkton Terriers post profit at 2026 annual general meeting". GX94 Radio. Harvard Media.
- Willberg, David (10 October 2026). "Estevan Bruins' financial picture improved in 2025–26". SaskToday.ca. Harvard Media.
