= Saskatoon Chief Mistawasis =

Provincial electoral district in Saskatchewan, Canada

Coordinates: 52°07′N 106°50′W

Saskatchewan electoral district

Provincial electoral district
- Legislature: Legislative Assembly of Saskatchewan
MLA
Don McBean
New Democratic
- District created: 1994
- First contested: 1995
- Last contested: 2024

Demographics
- Electors: 10,380
- Census division: Division No. 11
- Census subdivision: Saskatoon

Saskatoon Chief Mistawasis is a provincial electoral district for the Legislative Assembly of Saskatchewan, Canada. It covers the neighbourhoods of Lawson Heights, Silverwood Heights, and the surrounding area. This constituency includes the Saskatoon Provincial Correctional Centre and the SaskTel Centre.

== History ==
The riding was created as Saskatoon Northwest for the 1995 general election as a mixed urban and rural district out of parts of Biggar, Saskatoon River Heights and Saskatoon Idylwyld. The riding contained the neighbourhoods of Lawson Heights and Silverwood Heights, as well as the adjacent area of the Rural Municipality of Corman Park north and west of the South Saskatchewan River. The riding lost most of its rural territory to Martensville-Warman for the 2016 general election, and gained the largely industrial area around the Saskatoon John G. Diefenbaker International Airport.

For the 2024 general election, the riding gained significant territory east of the Chief Mistawasis Bridge, including Aspen Ridge and surrounding undeveloped area, from Saskatoon Silverspring-Sutherland and Saskatoon Willowgrove. As part of this change, the riding was renamed Saskatoon Chief Mistawasis.

== Members of the Legislative Assembly ==
Legislature	Years	Member	Party
23rd	1995–1999	Grant Whitmore	New Democratic Party
24th	1999–2001	Jim Melenchuk	Liberal
24th	2001–2003	Jim Melenchuk	Independent
25th	2003–2007	Ted Merriman	Saskatchewan Party
26th	2007–2010	Serge LeClerc	Saskatchewan Party
26th	2010	Serge LeClerc	Independent
26th	2010–2011	Gordon Wyant	Saskatchewan Party
27th	2011–2016	Gordon Wyant	Saskatchewan Party
28th	2016–2020	Gordon Wyant	Saskatchewan Party
29th	2020–2024	Gordon Wyant	Saskatchewan Party
30th	2024–present	Don McBean	New Democratic Party

== Election results ==
2024 Saskatchewan general election
Party	Candidate	Votes	%	±%
New Democratic	Don McBean	4,721	51.49	+16.49
Saskatchewan	Parminder Singh	4,162	45.40	-17.70
Green	Shane Caellaigh	285	3.11	+1.11
Total valid votes		9,168	98.85	
Total rejected ballots		107	1.15	+0.11
Turnout		9,275	63.25	+2.69
Eligible voters		14,664		
New Democratic gain		Swing		
Source: Elections Saskatchewan

2020 provincial election redistributed results
Party	%
Saskatchewan	63.1
New Democratic	35.0
Green	2.0

2020 Saskatchewan general election: Saskatoon Northwest
Party	Candidate	Votes	%	±%
Saskatchewan	Gordon Wyant	4,390	62.17	-3.31
New Democratic	Gillian Strange	2,519	35.68	+6.61
Green	Maria Krznar	152	2.15	+0.40
Total valid votes		7,061	98.96	
Total rejected ballots		74	1.04	–
Turnout		7,135	60.56	–
Eligible voters		11,782		
Saskatchewan hold		Swing		–
Source: Elections Saskatchewan

2016 Saskatchewan general election: Saskatoon Northwest
Party	Candidate	Votes	%	±%
Saskatchewan	Gordon Wyant	4,514	65.48	-4.87
New Democratic	Dennel Pickering	2,004	29.07	+3.68
Liberal	Eric Steiner	254	3.68	+1.68
Green	Nylissa Valentine	121	1.75	-0.51
Total valid votes		6,893	100.0	
Eligible voters		–		
Saskatchewan hold		Swing		–
Source: Elections Saskatchewan

2011 Saskatchewan general election
Party	Candidate	Votes	%	±%
Saskatchewan	Gordon Wyant	4,761	70.35	+11.40
NDP	Nicole White	1,718	25.39	-7.67
Green	Luke Bonsan	153	2.26	-0.09
Liberal	Eric Steiner	135	2.00	-1.03
Total		6,767	100.00	

October 18, 2010 By-election
Party	Candidate	Votes	%	±%
Saskatchewan	Gordon Wyant	3,051	58.95	+5.15
NDP	Jan Dyky	1,711	33.06	+3.38
Liberal	Eric Steiner	157	3.03	-11.73
Prog. Conservative	Manny Sonnenschein	133	2.57	-
Green	Larissa Shasko	122	2.35	+0.59
Total		5,175	100.00	

2007 Saskatchewan general election
Party	Candidate	Votes	%	±%
Saskatchewan	Serge LeClerc	4,513	53.80	+13.03
NDP	Ken Winton-Grey	2,490	29.68	-7.64
Liberal	Ryan Androsoff	1,238	14.76	-7.15
Green	Rick Barsky	148	1.76	*
Total		8,389	100.00	

2003 Saskatchewan general election
Party	Candidate	Votes	%	±%
Saskatchewan	Ted Merriman	3,197	40.77	+11.40
NDP	Jim Melenchuk	2,927	37.32	+2.98
Liberal	Ken McDonough	1,718	21.91	-14.38
Total		7,842	100.00	

1999 Saskatchewan general election
Party	Candidate	Votes	%	±%
Liberal	Jim Melenchuk	2,363	36.29	-4.83
NDP	Grant Whitmore	2,236	34.34	-11.47
Saskatchewan	Jerry Ehalt	1,912	29.37	*
Total		6,511	100.00	

1995 Saskatchewan general election
Party	Candidate	Votes	%	±%
NDP	Grant Whitmore	2,776	45.81	*
Liberal	Jim Melenchuk	2,492	41.12	*
Prog. Conservative	Nicholas Stooshinoff	791	13.05	*
Total		6,059	100.00	

== See also ==
- List of Saskatchewan provincial electoral districts
- List of Saskatchewan general elections
- Canadian provincial electoral districts
