= Martensville-Warman =

Provincial electoral district in Saskatchewan, Canada

Saskatchewan electoral district

Provincial electoral district
- Legislature: Legislative Assembly of Saskatchewan
- District created: 2013
- First contested: 2016
- Last contested: 2020
- Region: Saskatoon metropolitan area
- Communities: Martensville, Warman

Martensville-Warman was a provincial electoral district for the Legislative Assembly of Saskatchewan, Canada. It was created from parts of Martensville and was first contested in the 2016 election. It is currently represented by Terry Jenson from the Saskatchewan Party.

With the final report of the 2022 boundary commission, the riding was eliminated at the 30th Saskatchewan general election. Its two major cities form the cores of two successor ridings: Martensville-Blairmore and Warman.

== Members of the Legislative Assembly ==
Legislature	Years	Member	Party
District created from Martensville
28th	2016–2020	Nancy Heppner	Saskatchewan Party
29th	2020–2024	Terry Jenson	Saskatchewan Party

== Election results ==
2020 Saskatchewan general election
Party	Candidate	Votes	%	±%
Saskatchewan	Terry Jenson	7,137	74.01	-5.43
New Democratic	Carla Streeton	1,779	18.45	+1.33
Buffalo	Wade Sira	566	5.87	–
Green	Melvin Pylypchuk	161	1.67	+0.62
Total valid votes		9,643	99.36	
Total rejected ballots		62	0.64	–
Turnout		9,705	–	–
Eligible voters		–		
Saskatchewan hold		Swing		–
Source: Elections Saskatchewan

2016 Saskatchewan general election
Party	Candidate	Votes	%	±%
Saskatchewan	Nancy Heppner	6,854	79.44	–
New Democratic	Jasmine J. Calix	1,477	17.12	–
Liberal	Michael McAteer	179	2.07	–
Green	Darcy Robilliard	91	1.05	–
Western Independence	Pamela Spencer	26	0.30	–
Total valid votes		–	100.0	
Eligible voters		–		
Source: Elections Saskatchewan

== See also ==
- List of Saskatchewan provincial electoral districts
- List of Saskatchewan general elections
- Canadian provincial electoral districts
