= Saskatoon Greystone =

Former provincial electoral district in Saskatchewan, Canada

Coordinates: 52°06′30″N 106°36′16″W

Saskatchewan electoral district
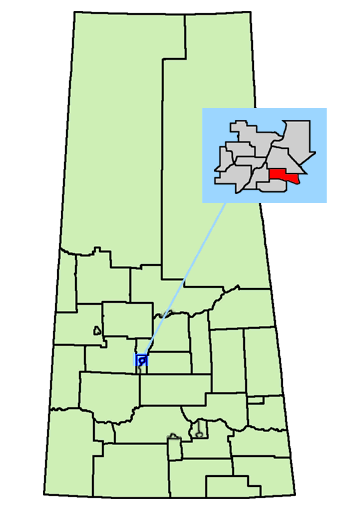

Defunct provincial electoral district
- Legislature: Legislative Assembly of Saskatchewan
- District created: 1991
- First contested: 1991
- Last contested: 2011

Demographics
- Electors: 11,295
- Census division(s): Division 11
- Census subdivision(s): Saskatoon

Saskatoon Greystone was a provincial electoral district for the Legislative Assembly of Saskatchewan, Canada. It was last contested in the 2011 provincial election before being dissolved into Saskatoon Churchill-Wildwood and Saskatoon University.

The district encompassed the Greystone Heights, Grosvenor Park, Brevoort Park, and Wildwood neighbourhoods of Saskatoon.

== Members of the Legislative Assembly ==
Parliament	Years	Member	Party
22nd	1991–1995	Lynda Haverstock	Liberal
23rd	1995–1999	Lynda Haverstock	Liberal
24th	1999–2003	Peter Prebble	New Democrat
25th	2003–2007	Peter Prebble	New Democrat
26th	2007–2011	Rob Norris	Saskatchewan Party
27th	2011–2016	Rob Norris	Saskatchewan Party
District dissolved into Saskatoon Churchill-Wildwood and Saskatoon University

== Election results ==
2011 Saskatchewan general election
Party	Candidate	Votes	%	±%
Saskatchewan	Rob Norris	4,885	58.39	+16.48
NDP	Peter Prebble	3,174	37.94	-0.87
Liberal	Simone Clayton	167	2.00	-14.90
Green	Tammy McDonald	140	1.67	-0.70
Total		8,366	100.00	

2007 Saskatchewan general election
Party	Candidate	Votes	%	±%
Saskatchewan	Rob Norris	4,030	41.91	+9.34
NDP	Andrew Mason	3,732	38.81	-10.28
Liberal	Zeba Ahmad	1,625	16.90	-0.87
Green	Robert Cram	228	2.37	+1.80
Total		9,615	100.00	

2003 Saskatchewan general election
Party	Candidate	Votes	%	±%
NDP	Peter Prebble	4,287	49.09	+1.23
Saskatchewan	Kevin Waugh	2,844	32.57	-0.40
Liberal	Herta Barron	1,552	17.77	-1.40
New Green	Brian Berezowski	50	0.57	*
Total		8,733	100.00	

1999 Saskatchewan general election
Party	Candidate	Votes	%	±%
NDP	Peter Prebble	3,630	47.86	+4.78
Saskatchewan	John Brennan	2,501	32.97	*
Liberal	Peter Stroh	1,454	19.17	-29.96
Total		7,585	100.00	

1995 Saskatchewan general election
Party	Candidate	Votes	%	±%
Liberal	Lynda Haverstock	4,013	49.13	-2.19
NDP	Marjory Gammel	3,519	43.08	+5.14
Prog. Conservative	Gary Hellard	636	7.79	-2.56
Total		8,168	100.00	

1991 Saskatchewan general election
Party		Candidate	Votes	%	±%
	Liberal	Lynda Haverstock	5,422	51.32	*
	NDP	Peter Prebble	4,009	37.94	*
	Prog. Conservative	Gary Hellard	1,094	10.35	*
}	Independent	Leslie Cushion	40	0.39	*
Total			10,565	100.00	

== See also ==
- List of Saskatchewan provincial electoral districts
- List of Saskatchewan general elections
- Canadian provincial electoral districts
