= Lynda Haverstock =

Canadian politician (born 1948)

The Honourable Lynda Haverstock OC SOM
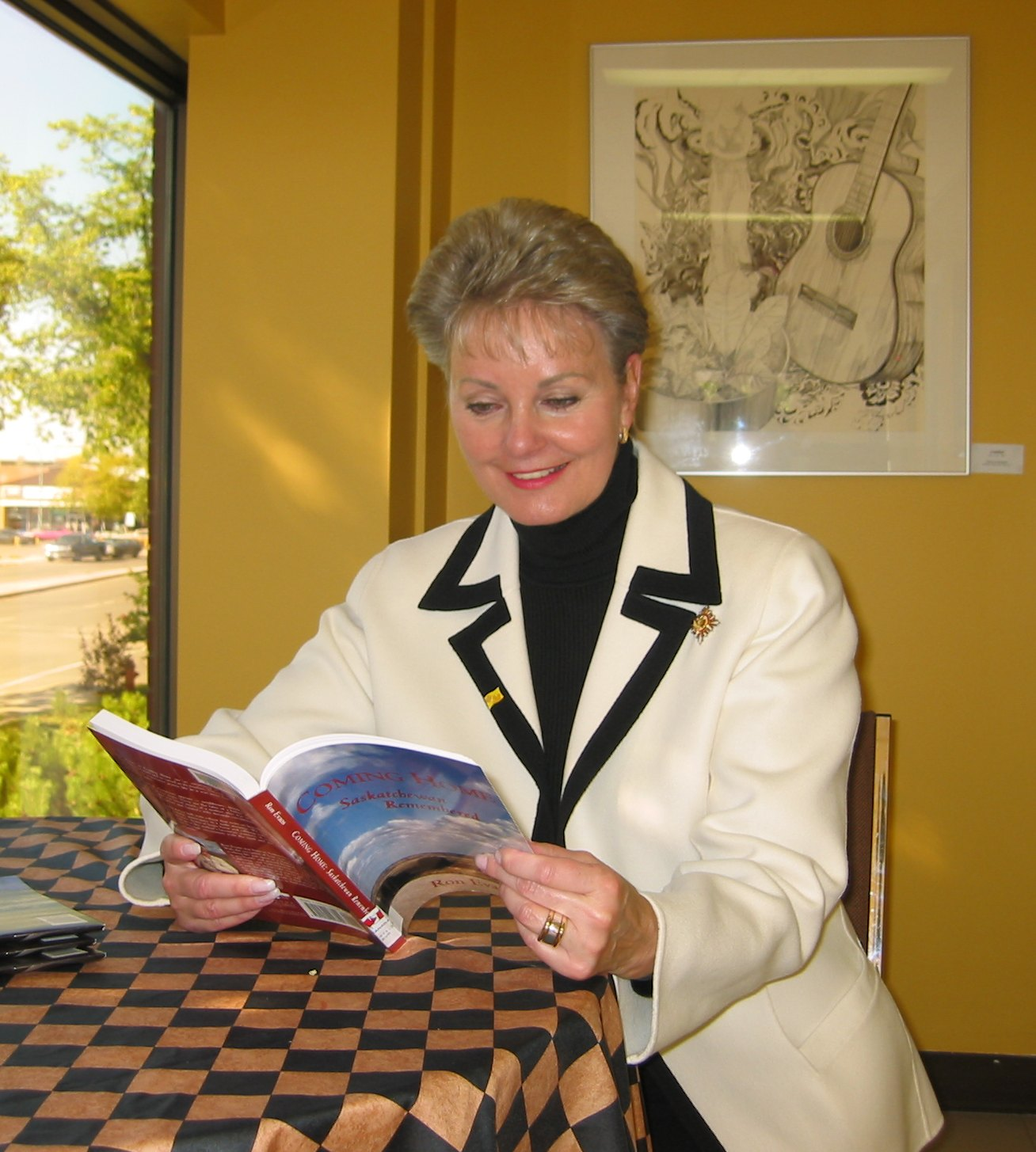
- Haverstock in 2005

19th Lieutenant Governor of Saskatchewan
- In office February 21, 2000 – August 1, 2006
- Monarch: Elizabeth II
- Governors General: Adrienne Clarkson; Michaëlle Jean
- Premier: Roy Romanow; Lorne Calvert
- Preceded by: Jack Wiebe
- Succeeded by: Gordon Barnhart

Leader of the Opposition (Saskatchewan)
- In office June 21, 1995 – November 12, 1995
- Preceded by: Bill Boyd
- Succeeded by: Ron Osika

Member of the Saskatchewan Legislative Assembly for Saskatoon Greystone
- In office October 21, 1991 – August 16, 1999
- Preceded by: Position established
- Succeeded by: Peter Prebble

Personal details
- Born: Lynda Maureen Ham; September 16, 1948 (age 77) Swift Current, Saskatchewan, Canada
- Party: Independent (1996–1999); Liberal (1989–1996)
- Spouse: Harley Olsen

Lynda Maureen Haverstock OC SOM (née Ham; born September 16, 1948) is the former leader of the Saskatchewan Liberal Party, was a member of the Legislative Assembly of Saskatchewan, and served as the 19th lieutenant governor of Saskatchewan from 2000 until July 2006. In 2007, she was named President/CEO of Tourism Saskatchewan.

== Biography ==
Born Lynda Maureen Ham and raised in Swift Current, Haverstock left high school after grade 10 to raise her infant daughter. As an adult, she returned to school to finish her education, and ultimately earned bachelor's and master's degrees in education, as well as a Ph.D. in psychology from the University of Saskatchewan. Haverstock rose to the forefront of the provincial Liberals in 1989 and was the first woman in Saskatchewan's history to lead a political party. She brought the Liberals to realize a healthy increase in support, taking over 23 per cent of the vote in the 1991 provincial election. However, their numbers were spread too thinly across the province to translate into seats. Haverstock was the only Liberal to win a seat, in Saskatoon Greystone.

Under her leadership, the party grew significantly: in the 1995 provincial election, it increased its caucus in the Legislative Assembly to eleven, becoming the Official Opposition. The Liberals captured one-third of the popular vote.

Faced with of a coalition of Regina Liberals and former Tories who had unsuccessfully challenged her leadership, Haverstock resigned as leader in 1995. She spent the remainder of her legislative term as an independent member. In 1999, she retired from politics.

The Liberal Party continued to be divided by internal fighting and several members of the Legislative Assembly, including those who had opposed Haverstock, left in 1997 to join the Saskatchewan Party. The 1999 provincial election reduced the Liberals to three seats in the legislature. Since 2003, they have failed to elect any members.

After leaving politics, Haverstock worked briefly as a radio host before being appointed Lieutenant Governor of Saskatchewan in 2000. As the Queen's representative, she was instrumental in organizing the province's centennial celebrations in 2005. Haverstock's term in office was extended and she remained Lieutenant Governor until July 31, 2006. During her tenure, she granted patronage to over one-hundred community-based organisations.

Dr. Lynda Haverstock is a member of the Order of Canada and the Saskatchewan Order of Merit, and has honorary doctorate degrees from the University of Regina, Royal Roads University (Victoria), and Queen's University (Kingston). She is a recipient of the Distinguished Canadian Award and is named among the University of Saskatchewan's 100 Alumni of Influence.

In June 2007, she became President/CEO of Tourism Saskatchewan, an arms-length, industry-driven authority responsible, in part, for marketing Saskatchewan as a destination. She has been successful in raising the profile of the organization and broadening awareness of Saskatchewan's tourism sector. Under her direction, the province's first Summit on Tourism was held in September 2007; six President's Task Teams were formed to provide guidance on key challenges and issues; a Quality Assurance Program for the sector was introduced; and the first Tourism Advocacy Day at the provincial legislature was held in November 2011. Between 2006 and 2010, the province's tourism revenues rose from $1.44 billion to $1.68 billion, and increase of 13.5 per cent.

Dr. Haverstock sits on the board of directors for Shaw Communications.

She and her husband Harley Olsen (former CEO of the Office of the Provincial Capital Commission and former Deputy Minister of Municipal Affairs) have four children and nine grandchildren.

Her brother Dennis Ham sat as a Conservative in the Saskatchewan assembly.

== Arms ==
Coat of arms of Lynda Haverstock
Notes The arms of Lynda Haverstock consist of: Crest Issuant from a circlet of prairie crocuses proper, a demi lion Gules wearing a coronet of maple leaves and prairie lilies and grasping the mace of the Legislative Assembly of the Province of Saskatchewan Or. Escutcheon Azure between three books Argent bound Or four garbs in fess also Or. Supporters Dexter a wood bison Argent accorné and unguled Or, sinister a horse Argent maned and unguled Or, both gorged with a collar of maple leaves Gules pendent therefrom a hurt, that to the dexter charged with a treble and a bass clef, that to the sinister charged with masks of comedy and tragedy Or. Compartment a mound set with conifers Vert and in base tapissé of wheat Or issuant from barry wavy Azure and Argent. Motto Courage Wisdom Integrity
