= Don McBean =

Canadian politician

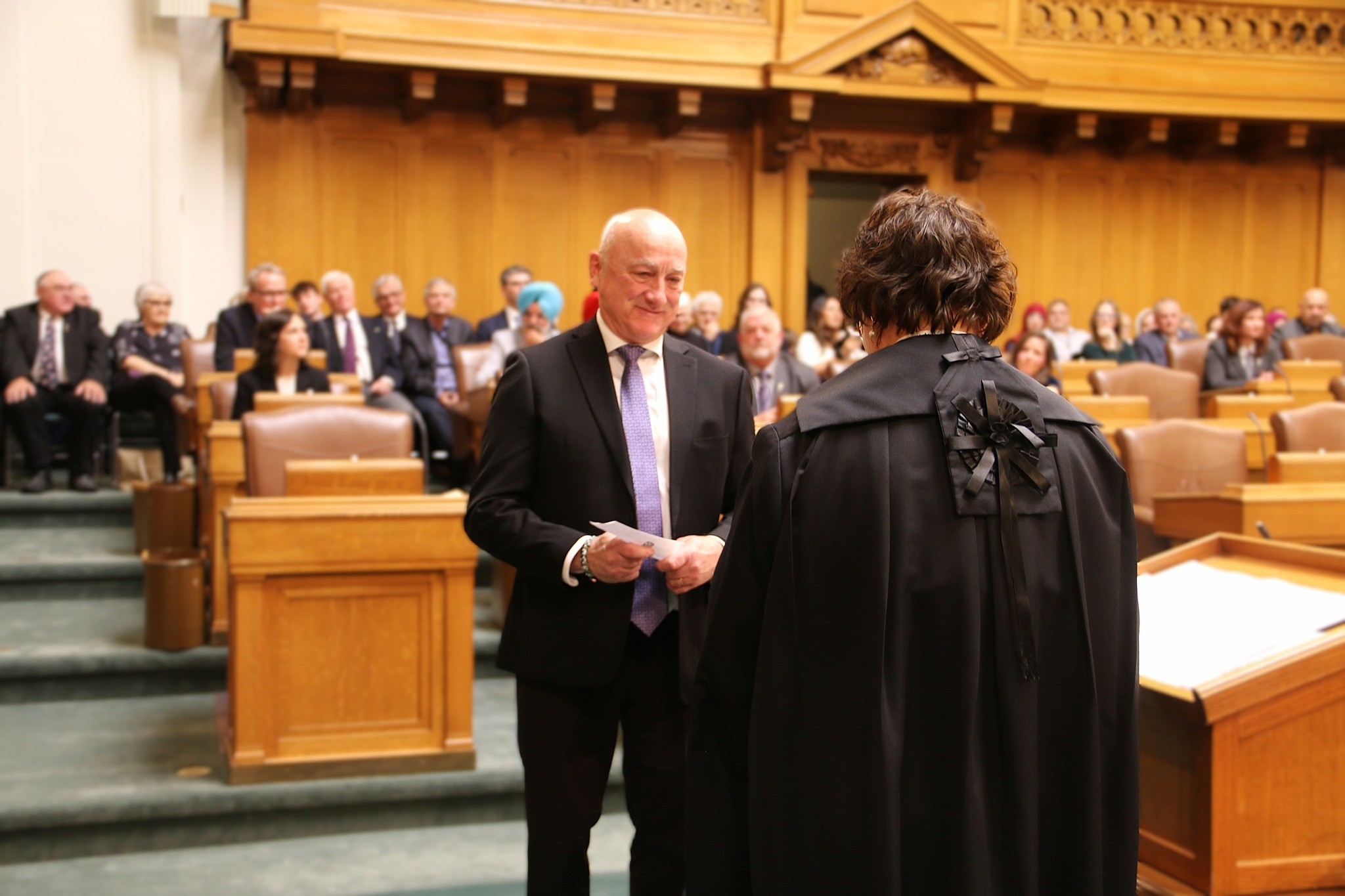

Member of the Saskatchewan Legislative Assembly for Saskatoon Chief Mistawasis
- Incumbent
- Assumed office October 28, 2024
- Preceded by: Gordon Wyant

Shadow Minister of Tourism, Saskatchewan Liquor and Gaming Authority, Sask Gaming
- Incumbent
- Assumed office November 13, 2024
- Preceded by: Nathaniel Teed

Personal details
- Party: Saskatchewan NDP

Don McBean is a Canadian politician who was elected to the Legislative Assembly of Saskatchewan in the 2024 general election, representing Saskatoon Chief Mistawasis as a member of the New Democratic Party. McBean was born in Swift Current, Saskatchewan.

Following the 2024 general election, McBean was appointed as the Shadow Minister for Tourism, the Saskatchewan Liquor and Gaming Authority, and SaskGaming.He is a retired teacher and principal. He opposed the education policies of the Saskatchewan Party.

Following the announcement of tariffs by US President Donald Trump, he called on the government and SLGA to cease purchasing liquor, beer, and wine from the United States and encouraged supporting local products instead.

== Election results ==
2024 Saskatchewan general election: Saskatoon Chief Mistawasis
Party	Candidate	Votes	%	±%
New Democratic	Don McBean	4,721	51.49	+16.49
Saskatchewan	Parminder Singh	4,162	45.40	-17.70
Green	Shane Caellaigh	285	3.11	+1.11
Total valid votes		9,168	98.85	
Total rejected ballots		107	1.15	+0.11
Turnout		9,275	63.25	+2.69
Eligible voters		14,664		
New Democratic gain		Swing		
Source: Elections Saskatchewan
