= Peter Prebble =

Canadian politician and environmentalist

The Honourable Peter W. Prebble ECS

MLA for Saskatoon Sutherland
- In office 1978–1982
- Preceded by: Harold Lane
- Succeeded by: Paul Schoenhals

MLA for Saskatoon University
- In office 1986–1991
- Preceded by: Rick Folk
- Succeeded by: riding dissolved

MLA for Saskatoon Greystone
- In office 1999 – November 20, 2007
- Preceded by: Lynda Haverstock
- Succeeded by: Rob Norris

Personal details
- Born: September 13, 1950 (age 75) Essex, England
- Party: New Democrat

Peter W. Prebble (born September 13, 1950) is a Canadian politician and environmentalist. He was an elected representative in the Legislative Assembly of Saskatchewan for 16 years between 1978 and 2007 and has been a longtime member of the Saskatchewan Environmental Society.

== Early life and education ==
Prebble was born in Essex, England, the son of Reginald Allen Prebble. In 1961, Prebble and his parents, Reg and Trudy, moved to Salmon Arm, British Columbia, where the family operated a dairy farm. They later relocated to Prince Edward Island, where they operated a motel and cottages. Prebble completed a university degree in business administration and began working as a community development worker, but ultimately followed his parents to Saskatchewan, where he pursued a graduate degree in education. Prebble holds two Master's degrees from the University of Saskatchewan, one in Education and another in Sustainable Environmental Management.

== Political career ==
Prebble had a long career as a New Democratic Party member of the Saskatchewan legislature, representing the constituencies of Saskatoon Sutherland from 1978 to 1982, Saskatoon University from 1986 to 1991, and Saskatoon Greystone from 1999 to 2007. He frequently contended with constituency boundary changes in a rapidly growing Saskatoon. Prebble staked a claim as the "comeback kid" of Saskatchewan politics, returning to the legislature after losing his seat on two occasions and unsuccessfully attempting a comeback out of retirement in 2011. He also served in the government's of three different premiers: Allan Blakeney, Roy Romanow, and Lorne Calvert.

Prebble was first elected in the 1978 provincial election in Saskatoon Sutherland. In the 1982 election he ran for re-election in the re-instated neighbouring district of Saskatoon University, but was defeated by Rick Folk of the Progressive Conservatives. He ran again in the 1986 election, that time defeating Folk. After that riding was dissolved ahead of the 1991 election, Prebble ran in the new district of Saskatoon Greystone that year, but was defeated by Liberal Party leader Lynda Haverstock. He did not run in the 1995 election. Following Haverstock's retirement, however, Prebble was re-elected in the 1999 election and served the district for two terms before retiring ahead of the 2007 election.

Prebble distinguished himself in government early on when he became a vocal critic of his own party's uranium mining policies; Prebble was the lone NDP MLA to vote against expanding mining activity in 1979, citing in particular concerns about the global nuclear arms race. Prebble later held a number of cabinet positions during his time in Lorne Calvert's government, where he championed sustainability and renewable energy. He acted as the Legislative Secretary for Renewable Energy and Energy Conservation from 2006 to 2007. In this role he authored "Renewable Energy Development and Conservation in Saskatchewan," also known as the Prebble Report, which advanced dozens of recommendations on expanding energy conservation and renewable energy development in the province. Prebble helped launch an energy conservation office, which operated for six years before it was closed by the Saskatchewan Party government following the 2007 election.

He was encouraged to come out of retirement to run in Saskatoon Greystone again in the 2011 election. He did so, citing his concerns about the dismantling of environmental programs by the new Saskatchewan Party government and stating that he was "determined to reverse these decisions and... to build a renewable energy future in the province." However, Prebble lost to incumbent Rob Norris.

== Post politics ==
In the mid-1990s, Prebble was the coordinator for Saskatoon Communities for Children. After his first retirement from politics in 2007, he acted as the director of energy and water policy for the Saskatchewan Environmental Society (SES). From 2012 to 2016 Prebble was the director of environmental policy for SES, a role in which he authored and co-authored numerous reports and articles on climate and energy policy. He remains a Board Member with SES. He also served as the President of the Board for the SES Solar Coop.

Prebble has been a vocal critic of the Saskatchewan Party government's environmental and climate change policies. He has also been an advocate for ecosystem and wildlife preservation.

In 2026, Prebble endorsed Avi Lewis in that year's federal NDP leadership race.

== Electoral results ==
2011 Saskatchewan general election: Saskatoon Greystone
Party	Candidate	Votes	%	±%
Saskatchewan	Rob Norris	4,885	58.39	+16.48
NDP	Peter Prebble	3,174	37.94	-0.87
Liberal	Simone Clayton	167	2.00	-14.90
Green	Tammy McDonald	140	1.67	-0.70
Total		8,366	100.00	

2003 Saskatchewan general election: Saskatoon Greystone
Party	Candidate	Votes	%	±%
NDP	Peter Prebble	4,287	49.09	+1.23
Saskatchewan	Kevin Waugh	2,844	32.57	-0.40
Liberal	Herta Barron	1,552	17.77	-1.40
New Green	Brian Berezowski	50	0.57	*
Total		8,733	100.00	

1999 Saskatchewan general election: Saskatoon Greystone
Party	Candidate	Votes	%	±%
NDP	Peter Prebble	3,630	47.86	+4.78
Saskatchewan	John Brennan	2,501	32.97	*
Liberal	Peter Stroh	1,454	19.17	-29.96
Total		7,585	100.00	

1991 Saskatchewan general election: Saskatoon Greystone
Party	Candidate	Votes	%	±%
Liberal	Lynda Haverstock	5,422	51.32	*
NDP	Peter Prebble	4,009	37.94	*
Prog. Conservative	Gary Hellard	1,094	10.35	*
Independent	Leslie Cushion	40	0.39	*
Total		10,565	100.00	

1986 Saskatchewan general election: Saskatoon University
Party	Candidate	Votes	%	±%
NDP	Peter Prebble	3,400	44.38	*
Prog. Conservative	Rick Folk	2,744	35.81	*
Liberal	Robert Crowe	1,518	19.81	*
Total		7,662	100.00	

1982 Saskatchewan general election: Saskatoon University
Party	Candidate	Votes	%	±%
Prog. Conservative	Rick Folk	3.490	47.28	*
NDP	Peter Prebble	3,041	41.20	*
Liberal	David Miller	718	1.00	*
Western Canada Concept	Earl Cowley	104	0.01	*
Other	Alphard Fafard	28	0.0	*
Total		7,381	100.00	

1978 Saskatchewan general election: Saskatoon Sutherland
Party	Candidate	Votes	%	±%
NDP	Peter Prebble	5,007	43.26	*
Prog. Conservative	Bill Lane	4,722	40.79	*
Liberal	Douglas Knott	1,845	15.94	*
Total		11,574	100.00	
