= Ben Heppner (politician) =

Canadian school teacher, businessman and politician

Member of the Saskatchewan Legislative Assembly for Martensville Rosthern (1995-2003)
- In office June 21, 1995 – September 24, 2006
- Preceded by: William Neudorf
- Succeeded by: Nancy Heppner

Personal details
- Born: March 18, 1943 Waldheim, Saskatchewan, Canada
- Died: September 24, 2006 (aged 63) Rosthern, Saskatchewan, Canada
- Party: Progressive Conservative (1995-1997); Saskatchewan Party (1997-2006)
- Spouse: Arlene Heppner
- Children: 3, including Nancy Heppner
- Education: University of Saskatchewan, Briercrest College and Seminary
- Profession: teacher

Benjamin D. Heppner (March 18, 1943 – September 24, 2006) was a Canadian school teacher, businessman and politician. He represented Rosthern and Martensville in the Legislative Assembly of Saskatchewan from 1995 to 2006.

Heppner was born in Waldheim, Saskatchewan in 1942 and grew up there. He graduated from the University of Saskatchewan with a B.A. and BEd and went on to teach school for 22 years. Heppner was also a partner in a farm equipment sales company and owned a lumber yard. He was elected to the town council for Rosthern, Saskatchewan and served as the town's mayor in 1988. Heppner was first elected to the Saskatchewan legislative assembly as a Progressive Conservative Party of Saskatchewan candidate in 1995, and became one of the founding members of the Saskatchewan Party in 1997. He was reelected to the legislature in 1999 and 2003.

He died of prostate cancer in Rosthern in 2006, aged 63 years old.

His daughter Nancy Heppner won election to the Legislative Assembly of Saskatchewan on March 5, 2007.
