= Saskatchewan Environmental Society =

Environmental organization

- Abbreviation: SES
- Formation: 1970
- Legal status: Registered charity
- Purpose: Environmentalism
- Headquarters: Saskatoon
- Location: Canada
- Official language: English
- Website: http://environmentalsociety.ca/
- Formerly called: Saskatoon Environmental Society

The Saskatchewan Environmental Society (SES) is an environmental charity based in Saskatoon, Saskatchewan. Founded in 1970 as a local volunteer organization, the Society's work has since expanded to encompass the entire province on a wide range of environmental issues.

== History ==
In August 1970 the SES was formed as the Saskatoon Environmental Society by a group of 100 local environmentalists during the first wave of the modern environmental movement. The group sprang up initially out of concerns stemming from years of industrial development with little environmental oversight. However, early organizers opted to orient the group on building awareness and making constructive recommendations rather than on narrowly protesting pollution, while basing their outlook in a long-term and holistic concept of sustainability. The group's early activity focused on press releases and government briefs, and the SES was instrumental in the formation of Saskatoon's first Environmental Advisory Council in 1973 to monitor and advise the city on environmental issues. The SES was also instrumental in the passage of the Saskatchewan Heritage Act. The group did at times find itself protesting, such as successfully organizing against the damming of the Churchill River and consequent flooding of large tracts of the province's boreal forest, and organizing against uranium and nuclear power development.

Despite involving itself in a number of issues of provincial concern, the SES was initially reluctant to officially expand its mandate and members voted against re-branding as the Saskatchewan Environmental Society in 1975. By 1981 this reluctance gave way to embracing a provincial role and the SES did rebrand with 'Saskatchewan' replacing 'Saskatoon' in its name. The following year, members endorsed a 12-point plan for the Society that touched on a number of activities and sectors such as agriculture, forestry, mining, water and land management, and the nuclear arms race. The SES' influence continued to expand in the following years, attracting enough funding to hire staff members and securing invitations to government consultations, including Environment Canada's first public consultation meeting in Ottawa in 1982. Beyond government lobbying, the group focused on public outreach, including through the production of materials for school teachers.

== Current activities ==
The Environmental Society's activities today are an outgrowth of its activities in previous decades, with a continued emphasis on briefing and lobbying governments and on public outreach and education. The SES has placed a particular emphasis on classroom materials and on energy efficiency training, including for building operators.

One of the main issues the SES focuses on currently is climate change in Saskatchewan. The group has been highly critical of the province's response to climate change and has produced numerous briefs and press releases to urge stronger legislation. In 2018 SES criticized the provincial government's "Prairie Resilience" climate strategy, arguing that it did not offer nearly enough ambition in reducing greenhouse gas emissions, with Saskatchewan being one of the highest per-capita emitters globally, and offering numerous recommendations on areas where the province could take stronger action.

Past SES logos

SES has also focused on building localized partnerships to advance practical solutions to lowering greenhouse gas emissions. One such solution has been the development of the SES Solar Co-op, which works toward accelerating the adoption of solar power in the province. In May 2020, the Co-op announced a new project that plans to build a nearly 1,000-panel solar array on an industrial site in Saskatoon. Another prominent project is the Renewable Rides program, which helped the Saskatoon Car-Share Co-op become the first public car-share with solar-powered electric vehicles. SES has also placed a focus on rural Saskatchewan communities, including through the Low Carbon Stories project, which engaged rural communities, farmers, and Indigenous communities to highlight innovative local climate solutions.
