= Martensville (electoral district) =

Former provincial electoral district in Saskatchewan, Canada

Coordinates: 52°25′N 106°40′W

Saskatchewan electoral district
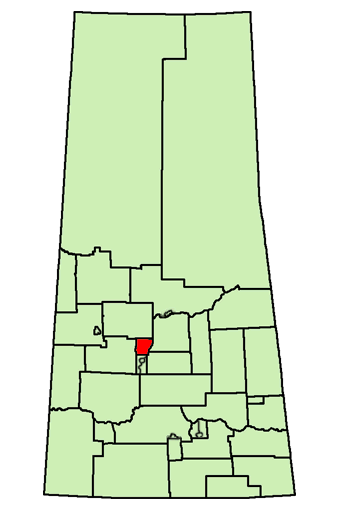

Defunct provincial electoral district
- Legislature: Legislative Assembly of Saskatchewan
- District created: 2002
- First contested: 2003
- Last contested: 2011

Demographics
- Electors: 13,371
- Census division: Division No. 16
- Census subdivision(s): Martensville, Warman

Martensville was a provincial electoral district for the Legislative Assembly of Saskatchewan, Canada, named after the city of Martensville, located north of Saskatoon.

The electoral district was created through the Representation Act, 2002 (Saskatchewan), mostly out of the former constituency of Rosthern. The city of Warman was also located in the riding. Smaller communities in the district included the towns of Hague, Waldheim, Osler, and Dalmeny; and the village of Hepburn.

The constituency was abolished for the 2016 election. It was essentially replaced by Martensville-Warman, a new constituency encompassing a portion of the old electoral district.

== Members of the Legislative Assembly (MLAs) ==
Name	Party	Elected	Left Office
Ben Heppner	Saskatchewan Party	2003	2006
Nancy Heppner	Saskatchewan Party	2007	2016

== Election results (2003–2016) ==
Saskatchewan General Election 2011, Martensville
Party	Candidate	Votes	%	±%
Saskatchewan	Nancy Heppner	6,819	83.14%	+9.67
NDP	Catlin Hogan	1,109	13.52%	-5.21
Green	Chad Wm. Crozier	274	3.34%	+1.39
Total		8,202	100.00%	

Saskatchewan General Election 2007, Martensville
Party	Candidate	Votes	%	±%
Saskatchewan	Nancy Heppner	5,981	73.47%	-3.82
NDP	Chris Gallaway	1,525	18.73%	+8.24
Liberal	Eric Steiner	476	5.85%	-1.67
Green	Hart Haidn	159	1.95%	-0.22
Total		8,141	100.00%	

=== Martensville provincial by-election, 2007 ===
A provincial by-election was held on 5 March 2007 to fill the vacancy left when MLA Ben Heppner died of prostate cancer. In a first for Saskatchewan politics, Saskatchewan Party candidate Nancy Heppner succeeded her late father.

March 5, 2007 By-Election: Martensville
Party	Candidate	Votes	%	±%
Saskatchewan	Nancy Heppner	3,566	77.29%	+22.04%
NDP	John Tzupa	484	10.49%	-16.38%
Liberal	Nathan Friesen	347	7.52%	-9.11%
Green	Sandra Finley	100	2.17%	*
Western Independence	Gordon Elias	42	0.91%	-0.69%
Marijuana	Nathan Holowaty	38	0.82%	*
Total		4,614 (6 spoiled)		

Saskatchewan General Election 2003, Martensville
Party	Candidate	Votes	%	±%
Saskatchewan	Ben Heppner	3,771	55.25%	–
NDP	Zane Dmytryshyn	1,834	26.87%	–
Liberal	Allan Earle	1,135	16.63%	–
Western Independence	Warren Fehr	85	1.25%	–
Total		6,825	100.00%	

== See also ==
- List of Saskatchewan provincial electoral districts
- List of Saskatchewan general elections
- Canadian provincial electoral districts
