= Ted Merriman =

Canadian politician

MLA for Saskatoon Northwest
- In office 2003 – November 20, 2007
- Preceded by: Jim Melenchuk
- Succeeded by: Serge LeClerc

Personal details
- Party: Saskatchewan Party

Ted Merriman, S.V.M., is a Canadian politician and member of the Saskatchewan Party. He represented the electoral district of Saskatoon Northwest in the Legislative Assembly of Saskatchewan from 2003 to 2007.

His son Paul Merriman was subsequently elected to the Legislative Assembly in 2011.

In April 2014, he was awarded the Saskatchewan Volunteer Medal for his volunteer work over many years in Saskatchewan.

pp
