= Gordon Wyant =

Canadian politician

The Honourable Gordon Wyant ECS KC
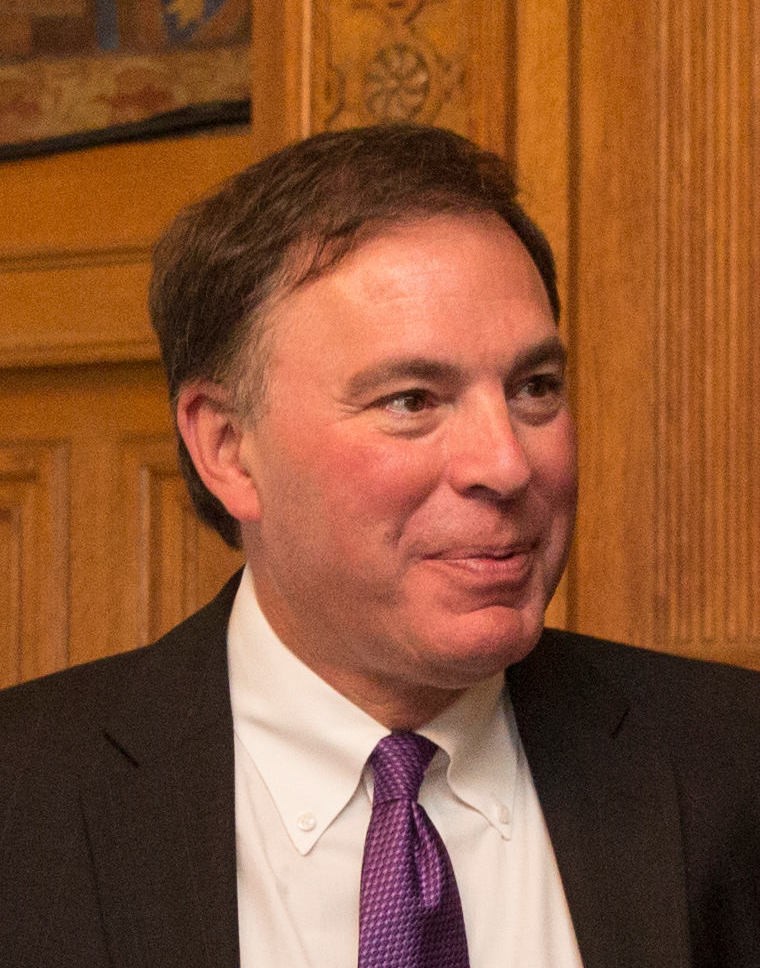

Member of the Saskatchewan Legislative Assembly for Saskatoon Northwest
- In office October 18, 2010 – June 10, 2024
- Preceded by: Serge LeClerc
- Succeeded by: Don McBean

Deputy Premier of Saskatchewan
- In office February 2, 2018 – November 9, 2020
- Premier: Scott Moe
- Preceded by: Don Morgan
- Succeeded by: Donna Harpauer

Saskatoon City Councillor
- In office October 22, 2003 – October 18, 2010
- Preceded by: Peter McCann
- Succeeded by: Randy Donauer
- Constituency: Ward 5

Personal details
- Born: 1957 (age 68–69) Saskatoon, Saskatchewan
- Party: Saskatchewan
- Other political affiliations: Liberal Party of Canada
- Occupation: Lawyer

Gordon S. Wyant, KC (born 1957) is a Canadian lawyer and politician. He served as a member of the Legislative Assembly of Saskatchewan with the Saskatchewan Party for the constituency of Saskatoon Northwest from 2010 to 2024. Wyant served in the cabinets of both Brad Wall and Scott Moe, including two stints as Attorney General. Prior to entering provincial politics, Wyant served on Saskatoon City Council from 2003 to 2010.

== Early life and career ==
Wyant was born and raised in Saskatoon, Saskatchewan. He earned both bachelor's and law degrees from the University of Saskatchewan. After receiving his law degree in 1986, Wyant was admitted to the bar in 1987 and practiced corporate law in Saskatoon. In 2008, he was appointed Queen's Counsel. Wyant served as a member of the Saskatoon Board of Police Commissioners and on the Board of Directors of Saskatoon's Credit Union Centre. He was also a public school board trustee from 2000 to 2002. Wyant worked as the business manager for Serge LeClerc before LeClerc was elected as MLA for Saskatoon Northwest as a member of the Saskatchewan Party in 2007.

== Political career ==
=== Saskatoon Public School Board ===
Wyant was a Public School Board Trustee from 2000 until 2003. He served two years as Board Chair.

=== Saskatoon City Council ===
Wyant was first elected to Saskatoon's City Council in 2003, representing Ward 5, and was re-elected in 2006 and 2009. During his time on council, Wyant was considered to be part of a conservative bloc of councillors who tended to align their votes. He was a supporter of curbside recycling and a critic of the rapid development of "big box" shopping centres.

=== Saskatchewan Party MLA ===
Serge LeClerc resigned as Saskatoon Northwest MLA in 2010, triggering a by-election for the seat. Wyant ran to succeed LeClerc under the Saskatchewan Party banner. He was elected MLA for Saskatoon Northwest on October 18, 2010, and consequently resigned from City Council. Wyant went on to be re-elected in the 2011 provincial election; he was then named Deputy House Leader and in 2012 was named to Premier Brad Wall's cabinet as Minister of Justice and Attorney General.

After Wall announced in August 2017 that he would be retiring, Wyant resigned from cabinet and entered the race to succeed Wall as Saskatchewan Party leader and Saskatchewan Premier. During his leadership campaign, Wyant promised a public inquiry into the Global Transportation Hub land scandal—an issue he first identified and flagged to the party in 2012 when serving as Attorney General—and pledged a $30 million increase in funding for education. Wyant criticized the emergence of abortion as a campaign issue, stating that the Supreme Court had offered "finality" on the issue. While he was criticized for his membership with the federal Liberal Party—which he cancelled in September 2017—Wyant promised to continue the party's combative approach to federal relations. Wyant ultimately finished fourth in the 2018 leadership election after being eliminated on the third ballot; the election was won by Scott Moe.

After Moe was sworn in as Premier, Wyant was appointed Deputy Premier and Minister of Education. He ended his advocacy for an inquiry into the GTH scandal, stating that it was the government's position to "move on" from it. Wyant was in charge of the education portfolio during the onset of the COVID-19 pandemic, and guided the implementation of the province's plans for reopening schools in the fall of 2020. In a late 2020 cabinet shuffle, Wyant took over the justice portfolio, beginning a second stint as Attorney General; he stayed in that role until May 2022, when he was named the advanced education minister. On October 12, 2023, Wyant voted with the government to introduce the controversial Bill 137—the Education Parents' Bill of Rights Amendment Act. Wyant was absent for subsequent votes, including the vote that enshrined the Parents' Bill of Rights into law. Despite the absences, Premier Moe stated that he was "100 per cent" confident that Wyant supported the legislation.

On February 6, 2024, despite having already been acclaimed the Saskatchewan Party candidate for the renamed riding of Saskatoon Chief Mistawasis, Wyant announced that he would not seek re-election in the 2024 provincial election. The same week, Wyant suggested that he was contemplating running to become mayor of Saskatoon in the fall 2024 municipal election. He was shuffled out of cabinet on May 17, and on June 10 he resigned as MLA for Saskatoon Northwest.

=== Saskatoon Mayoral campaign ===
On June 10, 2024, Wyant officially announced his run for mayor of Saskatoon in the 2024 municipal election; Wyant boasted about his connection with the Saskatchewan Party and stated that his campaign would focus on the planks of public safety, affordability, and transparency. Wyant ultimately finished as runner-up to two-term councillor Cynthia Block.

== Personal life ==
Wyant has four children with his wife, Christine Hrudka.

== Electoral history ==
2024 Saskatoon mayoral election
Candidate	Votes	%
Cynthia Block	30,412	44.7
Gordon Wyant	20,259	29.7
Don Atchison	10,460	15.4
Cary Tarasoff	6,386	9.4
Mike Harder	568	0.8
Total	68,085	100.00

2020 Saskatchewan general election: Saskatoon Northwest
Party	Candidate	Votes	%
Saskatchewan	Gordon Wyant	4,390	62.17
New Democratic	Gillian Strange	2,519	35.68
Green	Maria Krznar	152	2.15
Total		7,061	98.96
Source: Elections Saskatchewan

2016 Saskatchewan general election: Saskatoon Northwest
Party	Candidate	Votes	%
Saskatchewan	Gordon Wyant	4,514	65.48
New Democratic	Dennel Pickering	2,004	29.07
Liberal	Eric Steiner	254	3.68
Green	Nylissa Valentine	121	1.75
Total valid votes		6,893	100.0
Source: Saskatchewan Archives - Election Results by Electoral Division; Elections Saskatchewan

2011 Saskatchewan general election: Saskatoon Northwest
Party	Candidate	Votes	%
Saskatchewan	Gordon Wyant	4,761	70.35
New Democratic	Nicole White	1,718	25.39
Green	Luke Bonson	153	2.26
Liberal	Eric Steiner	135	2.00
Total number of valid votes		6,767	100.00
Source: Saskatchewan Archives - Election Results by Electoral Division

2010 by election: Saskatoon Northwest
Party	Candidate	Votes	%
Saskatchewan	Gordon Wyant	3,051	58.95
New Democratic	Jan Dyky	1,711	33.06
Liberal	Eric Steiner	157	3.03
Progressive Conservative	Manny Sonnenschein	133	2.57
Green	Larissa Shasko	122	2.35
Total number of valid votes		5,175	100.00
Source: Saskatchewan Archives - Election Results by Electoral Division

== Provincial cabinet positions ==
Saskatchewan provincial government of Scott Moe
Cabinet posts (3)
Predecessor	Office	Successor
Gene Makowsky	Minister of Advanced Education; May 31, 2022 – May 17, 2024	Colleen Young
Don Morgan	Minister of Justice and Attorney General; November 9, 2020 – May 31, 2022	Bronwyn Eyre
Bronwyn Eyre	Minister of Education; February 2, 2018 – November 9, 2020	Dustin Duncan

Saskatchewan provincial government of Brad Wall
Cabinet posts (2)
Predecessor	Office	Successor
Rob Norris	Minister of Corrections and Policing; August 23, 2016 – August 30, 2017	Don Morgan
Don Morgan	Minister of Justice and Attorney General; May 25, 2012 – August 30, 2017	Don Morgan
