= Terry Jenson =

Canadian politician

The Honourable Terry Jenson ECS MLA

Member of the Saskatchewan Legislative Assembly for Warman Martensville-Warman (2020-2024)
- Incumbent
- Assumed office October 26, 2020
- Preceded by: Nancy Heppner

Personal details
- Party: Saskatchewan Party

Terry Jenson is a Canadian politician, who was elected to the Legislative Assembly of Saskatchewan in the 2020 Saskatchewan general election and re-elected in the 2024 Saskatchewan general election. He represents the electoral district of Warman as a member of the Saskatchewan Party. He is currently the Minister of Social Services and Minister Responsible for the Saskatchewan Housing Corporation Prior to becoming Social Services Minister, he was the Minister of SaskBuilds and Procurement from May 27, 2024 to November 2024. He previously served as the Legislative Secretary to the Minister of Immigration and Career Training and has also been a member and past Chair of the Standing Committee on Human Services, a member of the Standing Committee of the Economy and a member of the Standing Committee of Crowns and Central Agencies. In the 2024 Saskatchewan general election, he was elected in Warman.
