= Serge LeClerc =

Canadian politician (1949-2011)

MLA for Saskatoon Northwest
- In office 21 November 2007 – 31 August 2010
- Preceded by: Ted Merriman
- Succeeded by: Gordon Wyant

Personal details
- Born: 24 October 1949 New Brunswick, Canada
- Died: 16 April 2011 (aged 61) Trenton, Ontario, Canada
- Party: Saskatchewan Party Independent
- Occupation: Writer, youth counsellor

Serge LeClerc (24 October 1949 – 16 April 2011) was a pardoned Canadian ex-criminal, former politician and co-author of the autobiography Untwisted.

He claimed to have been one of the most dangerous drug dealers and gang leaders in Canada. While serving in prison for one of his many convictions, LeClerc converted to Christianity, and began turning his life around. His career, aside from politics, consisted of speaking publicly to youth across Canada about his life and writing about his own experiences on such topics as drugs and violence.

LeClerc graduated from the University of Waterloo with an honours degree in sociology with a minor in social work, and with a social work diploma. He was an associate member of all of the Crime Stoppers chapters in Saskatchewan, and the founder and past director of Teen Challenge Saskatchewan. LeClerc also spoke against the Charter of Rights and Freedoms, stating that it puts the rights of the individual (criminal) over the rights of society as a whole. He was elected to represent the electoral district of Saskatoon Northwest in the Legislative Assembly of Saskatchewan in the 2007 election, as a member of the Saskatchewan Party.

== 2010 criminal allegations ==
On 16 April 2010, the Saskatoon office of the Canadian Broadcasting Corporation received a package containing audio recordings, allegedly of LeClerc, talking about marijuana and cocaine use, as well as sex with a gay man. The transcripts alleged many of the comments were made in the spring of 2009 when the legislature was in session. LeClerc removed himself from the Saskatchewan Party caucus on 16 April 2010, until he could "clear his name". On 20 April 2010, he announced he would not run in the 2011 provincial election. The Regina City Police began an investigation on 21 April 2010 but on 19 May 2010, they announced that no charges would be laid.

Members of the Legislative Assembly voted to turn the matter over to the conflict of interest commissioner. LeClerc resigned his seat on 1 September 2010. On 23 November 2010, Saskatchewan's conflict of interest commissioner, Ronald Barclay, issued a report concluding LeClerc had, in fact, engaged in unethical and unlawful conduct while in office. Barclay rejected LeClerc's claim that the audio tapes had been forged, based on forensic analysis done by the Royal Canadian Mounted Police. LeClerc had destroyed the hard drive from his government issue laptop computer, making any forensic analysis of its contents impossible.

A separate report from Barclay averred that LeClerc's constituency assistants did work for his public speaking business during their constituency office hours and using government office equipment. However that did not constitute a conflict of interest. LeClerc maintained that he was innocent of the criminal allegations made against him, and was the victim of a setup. He continued his anti-drug activism.

== Illness and death ==
In October 2010, LeClerc announced he had been diagnosed with stomach and colon cancer, and was undergoing treatment in Ontario, where he died on 16 April 2011.

== See also ==
- List of University of Waterloo people
