= Warman Wolverines =

Junior ice hockey team in Warman, Saskatchewan

- City: Warman, Saskatchewan
- League: SJHL
- Founded: 2025
- Home arena: Warman Home Centre Communiplex
- Colours
- Owners: Jonathan Abrametz; Cole Kachur
- President: Jonathan Abrametz
- General manager: Brett Pilkington
- Head coach: Brett Pilkington
- Website: warmanwolverines.com

Franchise history
- 1987–2025: Notre Dame Hounds

The Warman Wolverines are a Canadian Junior ice hockey team based in Warman, Saskatchewan, competing in the Saskatchewan Junior Hockey League (SJHL). The team was established by co-founders Jonathan Abrametz and Cole Kachur in 2025 following the relocation of the Notre Dame Hounds from Wilcox, Saskatchewan, to Warman. The team was previously affiliated with Athol Murray College of Notre Dame in Wilcox, before it was sold in 2025 and relocated to Warman. The franchise is notable for being the first SJHL team in the greater Saskatoon area since the Saskatoon Rage in the late-1990s.

== History ==
The Warman Wolverines were formed after a group of Saskatoon-based investors, led by Jonathan Abrametz and Cole Kachur, purchased the Notre Dame Hounds franchise in March 2025. The relocation to Warman was announced on February 18, 2025, with the team set to begin play in the 2025–26 SJHL season, pending approval from the SJHL’s annual general meeting in June 2025. The move was driven by a desire to bring junior A hockey to Warman, a community known for its strong hockey culture.

The ownership group aimed to transition the team to a community-owned, non-profit model within 5 to 10 years, aligning with the SJHL’s predominant ownership structure. The owners have reportedly funded about $850,000 (CAD) for the 2025-26 season along with plenty of support from business sponsors and more being announced in the upcoming days.

The Wolverines played their first game on September 19, 2026 against the Humboldt Broncos before a crowd of 1,345. The team struggled on the ice in its first season, finishing with a record of 14-36-3-3 and out of a playoff spot.

== Team identity ==
The name Wolverines was chosen to align with the team names of Warman High School. The team logo, a side profile of a wolverine, is similar, but not identical, to that of the school. The team colours are teal, red, dark blue and white. Red was chosen to honour the franchise's former identity as the Notre Dame Hounds, whose colours were red and white.

== Arena ==
The Wolverines will play their home games at the city-owned Warman Home Centre Communiplex (WHCC), which was built in 2011. The arena has capacity for 1,678 spectators, including 1,178 seated and 500 standing. A $15 million (CAD) expansion project began in February 2024, and was expected to be completed in the summer of 2025. The city also agreed to upgrade the score clock and other electronic audio-visual display boards in the arena.

== Warman Wolverines Roster ==
The following table lists players named to the Warman Wolverines’ preseason exhibition roster for the club’s inaugural 2025–26 Saskatchewan Junior Hockey League season.

Note: The roster includes forwards, defencemen and goaltenders drawn from Saskatchewan and other parts of Canada, along with several players from the United States.

No.	Name	Pos	Date of birth	Height	Weight	Shoots / Catches	Hometown
14	Evin Bossel	F	2006-11-16	6'0"	160 lb	R	Grassland, AB
17	Bexson Fox	F	2006-04-10	5'8"	165 lb	L	High River, AB
19	Brodie Scopick	C	2006-03-02	5'10"	170 lb	L	Saskatoon, SK
21	Hudson Kerr	F	2005-09-08	5'9"	165 lb	R	St. Paul, MN
22	Peyton Allard	C	2006-03-02	6'1"	172 lb	R	Winnipeg, MB
23	Caleb Pockrant	F	2007-02-23	6'2"	174 lb	L	Meadow Lake, SK
23	Cam Sarna	C	2007-12-08	5'9"	160 lb	L	Portage La Prairie, MB
27	Riley Rich-Holden	F	2006-01-25	6'3"	205 lb	L	Saanichton, BC
55	Ethan Dundas	F	2008-06-23	5'10"	150 lb	L	Regina, SK
59	Owen Parks	F	2007-11-27	5'8"	155 lb	L	Long Beach, CA
60	Caleb Buck	F	2009-09-26	5'7"	150 lb	L	Saskatoon, SK
61	Dylan Greenwald	F	2007-06-27	6'0"	181 lb	R	Oak Park, IL
63	Trae Lees	RW	2006-01-22	6'0"	175 lb	R	Warman, SK
63	Markus Thompson	F	2006-02-13	5'9"	165 lb	L	Warman, SK
64	Kayden Yeaman	F	2007-05-14	6'0"	174 lb	R	Lake Newell Resort, AB
67	Brady Keith	F	2009-01-30	6'0"	168 lb	R	Prince Albert, SK
68	Cruz Stacey	F	2008-07-15	6'0"	165 lb	L	Prince Albert, SK
70	Jackson Roberts	F	2007-09-25	6'2"	190 lb	R	Cranbrook, BC
71	Sawyer Scheidt	F	2008-05-28	5'8"	155 lb	L	Warman, SK
72	Camryn Aebig	F	2010-03-15	5'4"	134 lb	L	Warman, SK
74	Rafael Ramazanov	F	2009-11-13	5'5"	130 lb	R	Saskatoon, SK
75	Maclean Ethier	F	2010-01-21	5'6"	134 lb	L	Warman, SK
78	Xander Pritchard	F	2009-02-04	6'3"	174 lb	L	Saskatoon, SK
79	Corbin Nieman	F	2008-05-16	5'10"	134 lb	R	Outlook, SK
81	Brodyn Pladson	F	2008-01-19	5'9"	150 lb	R	Moose Jaw, SK
82	Carter Hudyma	F	2008-05-30	5'11"	161 lb	L	Moose Jaw, SK
83	Luc Smith	F	2009-11-14	6'2"	185 lb	L	Saskatoon, SK
85	Quinn McKenzie	F	2007-10-26	6'2"	207 lb	L	Foothills, AB
86	Tee Hagel	F	2007-11-16	5'11"	146 lb	R	Airdrie, AB
88	Kane Kennedy	F	2005-12-03	6'1"	165 lb	R	Airdrie, AB
89	Lucas Frame	F	2007-07-06	6'1"	176 lb	R	Calgary, AB
90	Lachlan Hanton	F	2007-08-04	6'0"	179 lb	R	Calgary, AB
91	Cruz Bear	F	2009-01-03	5'9"	146 lb	R	Ochapowace First Nation, SK
92	Dayce Derkatch	F	–	–	–	R	–
2	Dryden Ekstrom	D	2008-02-04	5'11"	161 lb	L	Wadena, SK
2	Vincent Palmarin	D	2005-11-19	6'2"	205 lb	R	Wilcox, SK
2	Brendan Quinn-Lagria	D	2005-01-20	5'9"	165 lb	R	Saskatoon, SK
4	Pherson Loehndorf	D	2007-01-18	6'1"	185 lb	L	Macklin, SK
12	Wylie Smith	D	2006-04-17	6'3"	195 lb	R	Carnwood, AB
16	Luke Lawford	D	2006-01-24	5'11"	165 lb	L	Calgary, AB
58	Karson Kerbes	D	2006-08-25	6'2"	192 lb	R	St. Albert, AB
62	Morgan Thompson	D	2009-02-27	5'9"	161 lb	L	Warman, SK
65	Harrison Todd	D	2007-07-02	6'1"	165 lb	L	Calgary, AB
66	Cooper Stockdale	D	2007-07-24	6'1"	190 lb	L	Delta, BC
69	Michael Tate	D	2007-09-18	5'8"	170 lb	L	Milford, MI
73	Wyatt Jordan	D	2008-04-02	6'0"	165 lb	R	Saskatoon, SK
77	Easton Bley	D	2009-02-08	6'1"	174 lb	L	Saskatoon, SK
80	Easton Moore	D	2009-03-28	6'0"	161 lb	R	Saskatoon, SK
87	Codey Sawin	D	2007-01-05	6'0"	161 lb	R	Kelowna, BC
30	Steven Wawryk	G	2008-02-18	5'10"	160 lb	Catches: L	Airdrie, AB
35	Eric Kahl	G	2006-02-01	6'2"	180 lb	Catches: L	Saskatoon, SK
35	Kaden Perron	G	2006-03-06	6'5"	200 lb	Catches: L	White City, SK
76	Domenik McInenly	G	2007-01-15	6'1"	181 lb	Catches: L	Red Deer, AB
84	Evan Hutcheon	G	2008-02-14	5'9"	154 lb	Catches: L	Regina, SK
93	Griffin Wright	G	–	–	–	Catches: R	–

== Coaching staff ==
Staff	Role / Position	Ref
Brett Pilkington	General Manager / Head Coach	
Nick Doyle	Assistant Coach	
Story Navrot	Trainer	

== Sources ==
- "Warman arena expansion project to start in February – Clark's Crossing Gazette". Clark's Crossing Gazette. 20 December 2023.
- Clausing, Shane (18 February 2025). "Future ownership group excited for Notre Dame Hounds' move to Warman". 650 CKOM.
- Romuld, Darrell; Maess, Donovan (19 February 2025). "'Bittersweet': SJHL conditionally approves move of Notre Dame Hounds to Warman". CTVNews Regina. Bell Media.
- "'It's bittersweet': SJHL commissioner Kyle McIntyre explains why Notre Dame Hounds are moving to Warman". MooseJawToday.com. Harvard Media. 19 February 2025.
- Shire, Taylor (22 February 2025). "Deep dive into why the Notre Dame Hounds are giving up Jr. A hockey". paherald.sk.ca. Regina Leader-Post.
- Weyland, Blaine (10 March 2025). "The Notre Dame Hounds will become the Warman Wolverines next season". discoverhumboldt.com.
- "Warman Wolverines confident in support as decision on final approval looms". 980 CJME. 25 May 2025.
- Walchuk, Benny (7 June 2025). "Warman Wolverines officially approved for 2025–26 SJHL season". SaskToday.ca. Harvard Media.
- Nielsen, Nick (7 June 2025). "Warman Wolverines officially newest team in SJHL". paNOW. Pattison Media.
- "Warman Wolverines officially newest team in SJHL". 650 CKOM. 8 June 2025.
- Walchuk, Benny (9 June 2025). "SJHL welcomes Warman Wolverines, adopt new player protection rule at annual general meeting". SaskToday.ca. Harvard Media.
- Pugh, Terry (10 June 2025). "Aebig chosen first overall by Warman Wolverines in SJHL draft – Clark's Crossing Gazette". Clark's Crossing Gazette.
- "Wolverines make first ever SJHL draft pick". CTV News. Bell Media. 11 June 2025.
- Roblin, Scott (11 June 2025). "Warman Wolverines receive approval to join SJHL, make franchise's first draft picks". Global News. Corus Entertainment.
