= Cy Warman =

American journalist and author

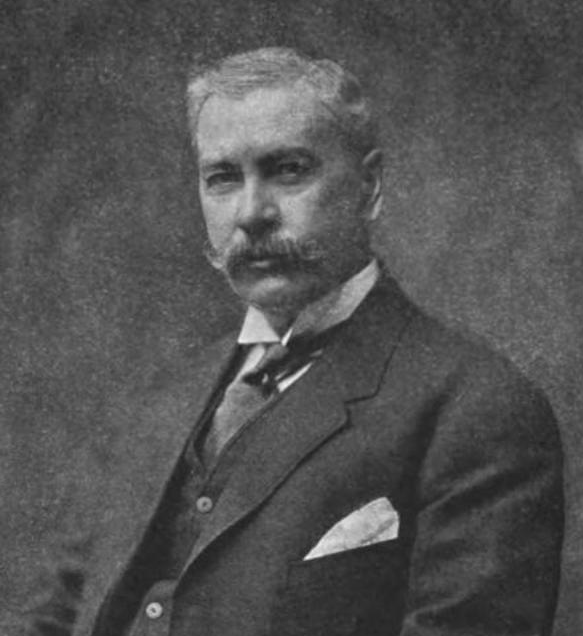
- Born: Cyrus Warman; June 22, 1855; Greenup, Illinois
- Died: April 7, 1914 (aged 58); Chicago, Illinois
- Occupation: Writer
- Spouses: Ida Blanch Hays (m. 1879; died 1887) Miss Marie Myrtle Jones (m. 1892)

Signature
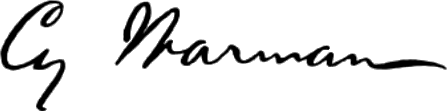

Cyrus Warman (June 22, 1855 – April 7, 1914) was an American journalist and author known during his life by the appellation "The Poet Laureate of the Rockies".

== Life ==
Cy Warman was born on a homestead to John and Nancy Askew Warman of Greenup, Illinois. He was educated at the common schools there and later became a farmer. Warman married Ida Blanch Hays of St. Jacob, Illinois in 1879.

In 1880, after failing as a wheat broker in Pocahontas, Illinois, Mr. Warman migrated to Denver, Colorado where the Colorado Silver Mining Boom was in progress. There, Warman worked for the Denver and Rio Grande Western Railroad progressing from a "wiper" (charged with keeping the engine area clean) to locomotive fireman and later to railroad engineer. These experiences became the basis for many of his early writings.

In 1888, Mr. Warman became editor of the publication Western Railway. He sold his interest in Western Railway in March 1892 and relocated to Creede, Colorado at the height of the Creede mining boom. There, he founded the Creede Daily Chronicle.

Warman achieved national recognition in 1892 when, after riding from New York City to Chicago in the cab of the locomotive The Exposition Flyer, he wrote his first railroad story, "A Thousand Miles in a Night" for McClure's Magazine. This was the first of a series of widely popular "True Tales of the Railroad" articles written for McClure's.

Warman's first wife, Ida, died in 1887. Warman remarried in 1892 to Miss Marie Myrtle Jones. Miss Jones inspired the lines for "Sweet Marie", a song which became a popular success in 1893 and was later featured in the 1947 film Life With Father starring Irene Dunne and William Powell.

Warman's writing also attracted the attention of the editors of the New York Sun. The Sun sponsored him in a journey of over 500 miles on horseback throughout the San Juan mining district of Colorado. The writings inspired by this journey were then published as regular and occasional pieces by The Sun.

For two years after his early successes, Warman traveled in Europe and the Far East as well as Alaska. Upon his return, he lived in Washington for several years and finally built a home in London, Ontario where he lived until his death in 1914.

== Death ==
In the winter of 1913-1914, Warman was stricken with paralysis while in a hotel in Chicago. He died several months later at the St. Luke's Hospital in Chicago after having been acutely ill for several weeks.

== Partial list of works ==
=== Books and pamphlets ===
- 1892: Mountain Melodies. Denver, CO: Cy Warman. 1892.
- 1894:The Prospector: Story of the Life of Nicholas C. Creede. Denver, CO: The Great Divide Publishing Company. September 12, 1894.
- 1895: Tales of an Engineer. New York, NY: Charles Scribner's Sons. 1895. ISBN 9780665157400.
- 1897: The Express Messenger and Other Tales of the Rail. New York, NY: Charles Scribner's Sons. 1897.
- 1898: Frontier Stories. New York, NY: Charles Scribner's Sons. 1898.
- 1899: The White Mail. New York, NY: Charles Scribner's Sons. 1899. ISBN 9780665255120.
- 1899: Snow on the Headlight: A Story of the Great Burlington Strike. New York, NY: D. Appleton and Company. 1899.
- 1904: Utah: Being a Concise Description of the Vast Resources of a Wonderful Region. New York, NY: Denver & Rio Grande Railroad (Passenger Department). 1906. ISBN 9781421971421. With Patrick Donan.
- 1906: The Last Spike and Other Railroad Stories. New York, NY: Charles Scribner's Sons. 1906.
- 1906: The Story of the Railroad. The Story of the West Series (Ripley Hitchcock, ed.). New York, NY: D. Appleton and Company. 1906.
- 1908: Weiga of the Temagami and Other Indian Tales. New York, NY: H.M. Caldwell Company. 1908. p. 1.
- 1911: Songs of Cy Warman. Boston, MA: Rand Avery Company. 1911.

=== Journals and periodicals ===
- 1892: "When We Go Off and Die", The Creede Chronicle (as reprinted in the Los Angeles Herald), vol. 39, no. 34, November 14, 1892 Poetry.
- 1893: "Creede". Colorado Magazine. 1 (2). The Colorado Publishing Company: 163–172. May 1893.
- 1894: "A Thousand-Mile Ride on the Engine of the Swiftest Train in the World: From New York to Chicago in the Cab of the Exposition Flyer". McClure's Magazine. II (2). S.S. McClure, Limited: 164–184. January 1894.
- 1894: "The Death Run". McClure's Magazine. III (3). S. S. McClure Limited: 248–251. August 1894.
- 1894: "The Opening of an Empire". McClure's Magazine. III (4). S. S. McClure Limited: 355–368. August 1894.
- 1894: "Flying Through Flames". McClure's Magazine. III (5). S. S. McClure Limited: 422–423. October 1894.
- 1894: "Song of Serenade". McClure's Magazine. III (6). S. S. McClure Limited: 530. November 1894. Poetry.
- 1895: "On the Engine of a London and Paris Express". McClure's Magazine. V (2). S. S. McClure Limited: 156–162. July 1895.
- 1895: "Railroading Over An Earthquake". McClure's Magazine. V (5). S. S. McClure Limited: 415–418. October 1895.
- 1895: "Through the Dardanelles". McClure's Magazine. VI (1). S. S. McClure Limited: 103–108. December 1895.
- 1896: "The Story of Cripple Creek". The Review of Reviews. XIII (2). The Review of Reviews Corporation: 161–166. February 1896.
- 1896: "Catching a Runaway Engine". McClure's Magazine. VI (6). S. S. McClure Limited: 589–590. May 1896.
- 1896: "The Locomotive That Lost Herself". McClure's Magazine. VII (1). S. S. McClure Limited: 89–96. June 1896.
- 1897: "True Railroad Stories". McClure's Magazine. VIII (6). S. S. McClure Limited: 539–546. April 1897.
- 1897: "The Vicissitudes of Engine 107". McClure's Magazine. IX (2). S. S. McClure Limited: 717–721. June 1897.
- 1897: "Will the Lights be White?". McClure's Magazine. IX (4). S. S. McClure Limited: 861. August 1897. Poetry.
- 1898: "An American at Karlsbad". McClure's Magazine. X (3). S. S. McClure Limited: 204–210. January 1897.
- 1898: "The Passing of McIvor". McClure's Magazine. XI (5). S. S. McClure Limited: 484–486. September 1897.
- 1898: "The Passing of "Soapy" Smith: Reminiscences of the Notorious Klondike Gambler, Confidence Man and Politician Who Met His Death While Trying to Clean Out a Vigilance Committee That Proved Too Strong for Him.", San Francisco Call, vol. 84, no. 96, September 4, 1898
- 1899: "The Fighting Manager". McClure's Magazine. XIII (5). S. S. McClure Limited: 475–480. September 1899.
- 1900: "Building a Railroad into the Klondike". McClure's Magazine. XIV (5). S.S. McClure Co.: 419–426 March 1900.
- 1900: "The Search for Gold". McClure's Magazine. XIV (6). S. S. McClure Limited: 475–480. April 1899. Poetry.
- 1900: "Soldiers of the Rail". Munsey's Magazine. XXIII. Frank A. Munsey: 458–462. July 1900.
- 1902: "The Giant Growth of the "Soo": Wonderful Industrial Plants Created by the Power Canals of Sault Ste. Marie". The American Monthly Review of Reviews. XXVI (6): 689–693. December 1902.
- 1903: "Coming Back To Canada". The Idler. 22: 760–762. March 1903. Poetry.
- 1906: "The Man that Made the Canadian Pacific: The Story of Sir William Van Horne". The World To-Day. VIII (5). The World To-Day Company: 511–514. May 1905.
- 1906: "The President and the Railroad". Hearst's International (The World To-Day). X (3). International Magazine Company: 261–262. March 1906.
- 1906: Lefroy, W. (April 21, 1906). "The American Farmer in Canada". Canada: An Illustrated Weekly Journal. II: 56.
- 1911: "The Effect of Competition". Granite Monthly: A New Hampshire Magazine. XLIV (6&7). The Granite Monthly Company: 222–221. June–July 1911.

== See also ==
- Warman, Saskatchewan
- Warman railway station
- Robert W. Service
