= Rob Norris =

Canadian politician

The Honourable Rob Norris ECS
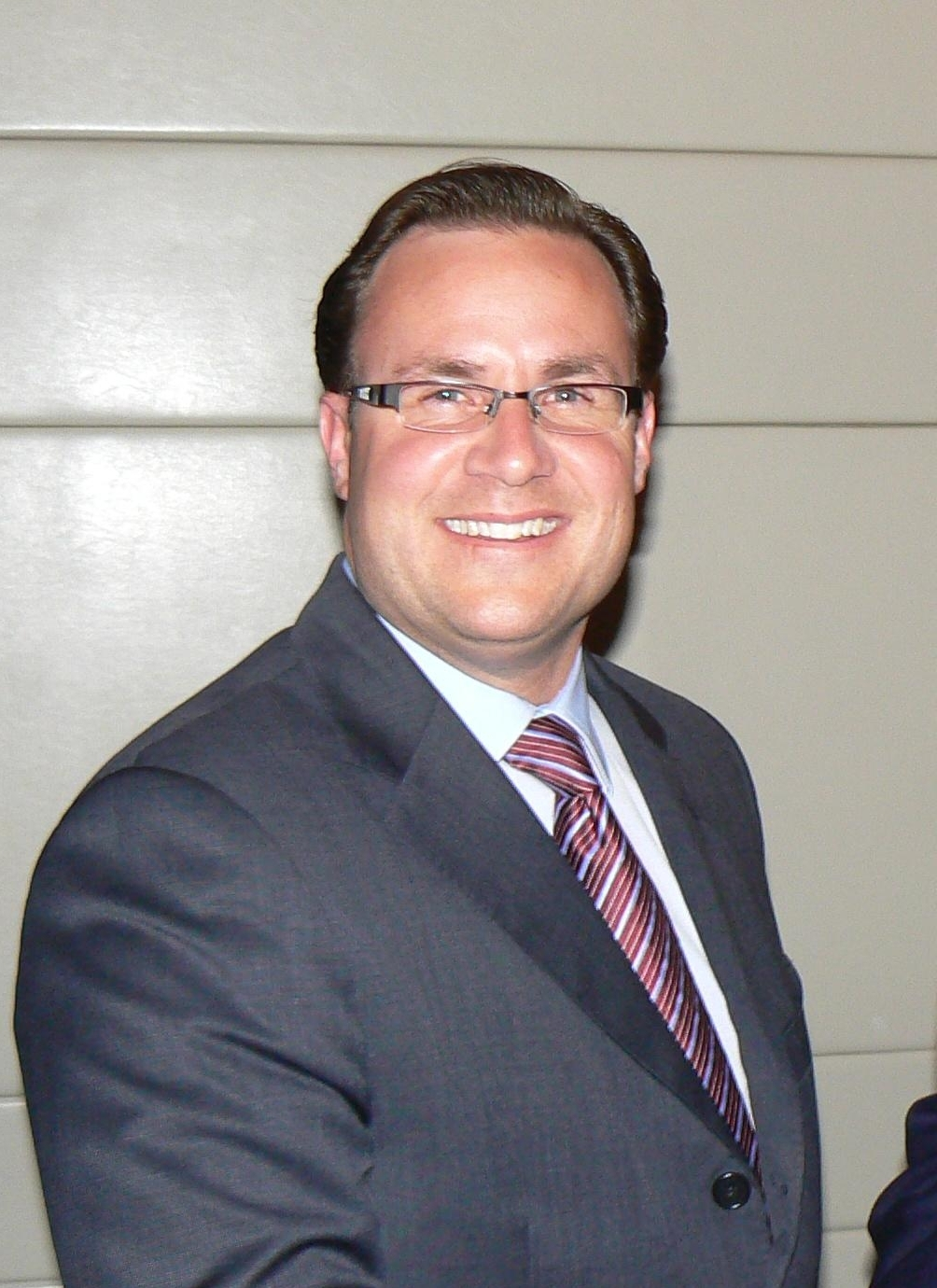
- Norris in 2006

MLA for Saskatoon Greystone
- In office November 21, 2007 – December 31, 2015
- Preceded by: Peter Prebble
- Succeeded by: Lisa Lambert

Personal details
- Born: Edmonton, Alberta, Canada
- Party: Saskatchewan Party
- Other political affiliations: Liberal Party of Canada

Rob Norris is a former Canadian politician and retired government relations officer. He was a member of the Legislative Assembly of Saskatchewan from 2007 to 2016 as a member of the Saskatchewan Party, and formerly a member of the Saskatchewan Liberal Party.

== Early life ==
Norris was born in Edmonton. Throughout the 1990s and the early 2000s he spent time pursuing educational and political opportunities in Alberta, Saskatchewan, and Ontario. Norris moved to Saskatoon in 1994, taking courses at the University of Saskatchewan where he first got involved in student politics. In the late 1990s, he moved to Ottawa, working as a legislative assistant in the House of Commons. Norris received a master's degree in political science from the University of Alberta in 2004. He then returned to Saskatoon and worked as the coordinator of Global Relations at the University of Saskatchewan.

== Political career ==
=== Provincial politics ===
Norris first entered provincial politics as a member of the Saskatchewan Liberal Party, and he ran unsuccessfully for the Liberals in the 2003 provincial election. Norris was then recruited by Brad Wall to join and run for the Saskatchewan Party, which had formed in 1997 as a coalition between former Progressive Conservative and Liberal party members.

Norris was elected as MLA for Saskatoon-Greystone in the 2007 provincial election by a narrow margin of 300 votes. Norris was appointed as the Minister responsible for Advanced Education, Labour, and Immigration in the first Saskatchewan Party government. In these roles Norris oversaw changes to the Graduate Retention Program, implemented a new strategy for immigration, and helped to promote occupational health and safety through the launch of "Mission Zero".

Perhaps Rob Norris's most significant contribution to public policy was his work that resulted in an entrenched right to strike as a constitutionally protected right. In 2007, Norris led the implementation of revised labour legislation in Saskatchewan introducing Bill 5, the Public Services Essential Services Act, and Bill 6, the Trade Union Amendment Act. Both bills were maligned as anti-labour, as they removed the right to strike for more than 65,000 workers and made it harder for workers to unionize, and they would prove among the most contentious issues of the government's term. The former was ultimately struck down after being deemed unconstitutional by the Supreme Court of Canada in 2015. In their decision on Norris's Public Services Essential Services Act, the Supreme Court decision codified that the right to strike is a constitutionally protected right, as a guaranteed right of freedom of association protected by Section 2(d) of the Canadian Charter of Rights and Freedoms.

In 2010 Norris cut provincial funding to the First Nations University of Canada amid controversies over financial mismanagement at the institution. The provincial government had already for years been focused on reforming governance at the university. The cut to provincial funding led to the loss of federal grant money as well, ultimately leading to a radical restructuring in order to save the institution. It sold its Saskatoon campus to help fund severance packages and downsized its departments and course offerings.

In June 2010, Norris's responsibilities were reduced in a cabinet shuffle, with the Labour portfolio passing to the Minister of Justice, Don Morgan. Retaining the Advanced Education and Immigration portfolios, Norris also became responsible for SaskPower and Innovation. In 2011 he oversaw the approval of $1.2 billion in funding to build a carbon capture and storage facility at SaskPower's Boundary Dam coal-fired generating station. The facility ultimately opened in 2014 as the world's first utility-scale CCS facility.

Norris was re-elected as MLA for Saskatoon-Greystone in the 2011 provincial election, warding off a challenge from Peter Prebble, who had represented the constituency from 1999 to 2007. Norris retained his responsibility for Immigration and in early 2012 led efforts to restructure the province's Immigration Nominee Program. The changes made it more difficult for immigrants to nominate family members for immigration, and the abrupt nature of the changes led to protests.

Norris was dropped from the cabinet in a shuffle six months after the 2011 election, in May 2012. He was named Legislative Secretary for First Nations and Métis Engagement and for International Trade and Education before returning to cabinet in September 2013, taking over his former post as Minister of Advanced Education amidst a funding crisis at the University of Saskatchewan. After the province announced cuts to the university's operating budget, the institution launched a controversial program review with the aim of reducing its budget. The crisis ultimately led to the firing of the university's president, Ilene Busch-Vishniac. In 2015, Busch-Vishniac launched a lawsuit over the dismissal, in which Norris and Premier Brad Wall were named as defendants along with the university and its Board of Governors. Busch-Vischniac alleged that Norris and Wall interfered unlawfully in the university's business, influencing the board in its decision to fire her. In May 2019, the university board's effort to have the case dismissed failed and the case was allowed to proceed.

In 2014 Norris announced that he would not be running in the 2016 provincial election, and he was subsequently dropped from the cabinet. In December 2015 he announced that he was resigning as MLA before the upcoming election in order to take a new position at the University of Saskatchewan. At the time of his departure Norris had been considered one of the last remaining "liberal" presences in the Saskatchewan Party government at a time when the federal Liberal Party had just returned to power.

=== Mayoral bid ===
In 2016 Norris was rumoured to be considering a run for mayor of Saskatoon. Norris claimed that unnamed organizations were working to recruit him into the race, but he ultimately decided not to run, citing his commitments to the University of Saskatchewan.

In 2019 Norris claimed again that he was being encouraged to run for mayor, and he was openly critical about the direction of the city, citing the need for what he called "a growth agenda." After delaying a campaign announcement due to the onset of the COVID-19 pandemic, Norris officially launched a bid for the mayoralty in June 2020, challenging incumbent Charlie Clark ahead of a November election. Norris framed his campaign around his experience as a provincial cabinet minister and on the planks of crime, safety and economic growth. After announcing his campaign Norris was endorsed by former Premier Brad Wall.

Norris called for increased funding for the Saskatoon Police Service. He also vowed to lower the city's property tax increase to 1% annually by instituting a hiring freeze, promised to cut fees for business licenses, and to institute a one-time tax break for sports and arts organizations. Norris took aim at a number of high-profile projects that he attributed to Clark, vowing to halt a new downtown library project—which he characterized as "gold plated"—along with a rapid-transit system and a greenhouse gas emissions-reduction plan. Norris was criticized by Clark throughout the campaign for spreading misinformation, and media commentators noted that Norris often failed to provide evidence for his claims about those projects. Clark also charged that Norris had organized a slate of candidates for the election, citing his presence at campaign launches and efforts at door-knocking with candidates who were running on similar campaign commitments, but Norris denied the charge. Norris was also accused of using "divisive language" by the management of a local shelter after saying it needed "fixing and removal." He further became embroiled in controversy for a Halloween social media post making unsubstantiated accusations about Clark mistreating female board members at the city's modern art gallery. Although Norris expressed "regret" for the post, he blamed it on campaign manager Dale Richardson, who was ultimately fired over the incident. Richardson was later identified as the source of a large in-kind donation of $19,629.94 to Norris's failed mayoral campaign. Norris also campaigned on a platform of increasing the speed limit in the Northeast swale from 60 km/h to 70 km/h, despite this being above the road's design limits and the risk increased injury and death due to vehicle - wildlife collisions in this area. The Saskatoon & District Labour Council, which typically only endorses candidates, also warned voters against supporting Norris due to his record as Labour minister. The president of the Council, Don MacDonald, said that "[t]here's not a lot of trust" with Norris, and that he was "not considered a friend of labour."

Norris' mayoral campaign was ultimately unsuccessful. Although he garnered more votes than former Saskatoon mayor Don Atchison, who was attempting a comeback, he finished a distant second to Clark. Although Norris blamed the loss on a split vote with Atchison, Clark ultimately received more votes than Norris and Atchison combined.

== Federal politics ==
On May 26, 2022, Norris endorsed former Quebec Premier and Conservative Leadership Candidate Jean Charest for the leadership of the Conservative Party of Canada.

== Controversies ==
In 2015, Norris was named as a defendant in a lawsuit alongside Brad Wall, the University of Saskatchewan, and its Board of Governors for the controversial firing of the university's president, Ilene Busch-Vishniac. Wall and Norris are accused of unlawfully inserting themselves into the Board's decision to fire Busch-Vishniac.

In 2023, Norris retweeted a transphobic post from Cary Tarasoff, that protested the City of Saskatoon policy that permitted athletic facility users to use the change room consistent with their gender identity. Tarasoff's tweets that misgender a facility user as 'male' indicate the transphobic intention of this protest.

Despite Norris's representations of being an ally to the queer and trans community, he has remained silent regarding the introduction of policies by the SaskParty government that target gender diverse students and policies promoted by federal Conservative Party of Canada members that similarly target transgender people.

== Personal life ==
After deciding to leave provincial politics in 2016, Norris re-joined the University of Saskatchewan as a senior strategist for partnerships. From 2019 to 2022, he served in a government relations role at the Canadian Light Source on the university campus. He is now retired from the University of Saskatchewan.

Norris has served as board chair for Canada World Youth. He has also been an election observer in Tunisia and Lebanon and worked on governance projects in Eastern Europe and Africa.

== Electoral record ==
2020 Saskatoon mayoral election
| Candidate | Votes | % |
|---|---|---|
| Charlie Clark | 27,377 | 46.9 |
| Rob Norris | 15,261 | 26.1 |
| Don Atchison | 11,722 | 20.1 |
| Cary Tarasoff | 2,650 | 4.5 |
| 2 other candidates | 1,360 | 2.3 |
| Total | 58,370 | 100.00 |

2011 Saskatchewan general election: Saskatoon Greystone
| Party | Candidate | Votes | % | ±% |
|---|---|---|---|---|
| Saskatchewan | Rob Norris | 4,885 | 58.39 | +16.48 |
| NDP | Peter Prebble | 3,174 | 37.94 | -0.87 |
| Liberal | Simone Clayton | 167 | 2.00 | -14.90 |
| Green | Tammy McDonald | 140 | 1.67 | -0.70 |
| Total | | 8,366 | 100.00 | |
Elections Saskatchewan

2007 Saskatchewan general election: Saskatoon Greystone
| Party | Candidate | Votes | % | ±% |
|---|---|---|---|---|
| Saskatchewan | Rob Norris | 4,030 | 41.91 | +9.34 |
| NDP | Andrew Mason | 3,732 | 38.81 | -10.28 |
| Liberal | Zeba Ahmad | 1,625 | 16.90 | -0.87 |
| Green | Robert Cram | 228 | 2.37 | +1.80 |
| Total | | 9,615 | 100.00 | |
Elections Saskatchewan
