= Don Morgan =

Canadian politician (born 1951)

The Honourable Don Morgan ECS KC
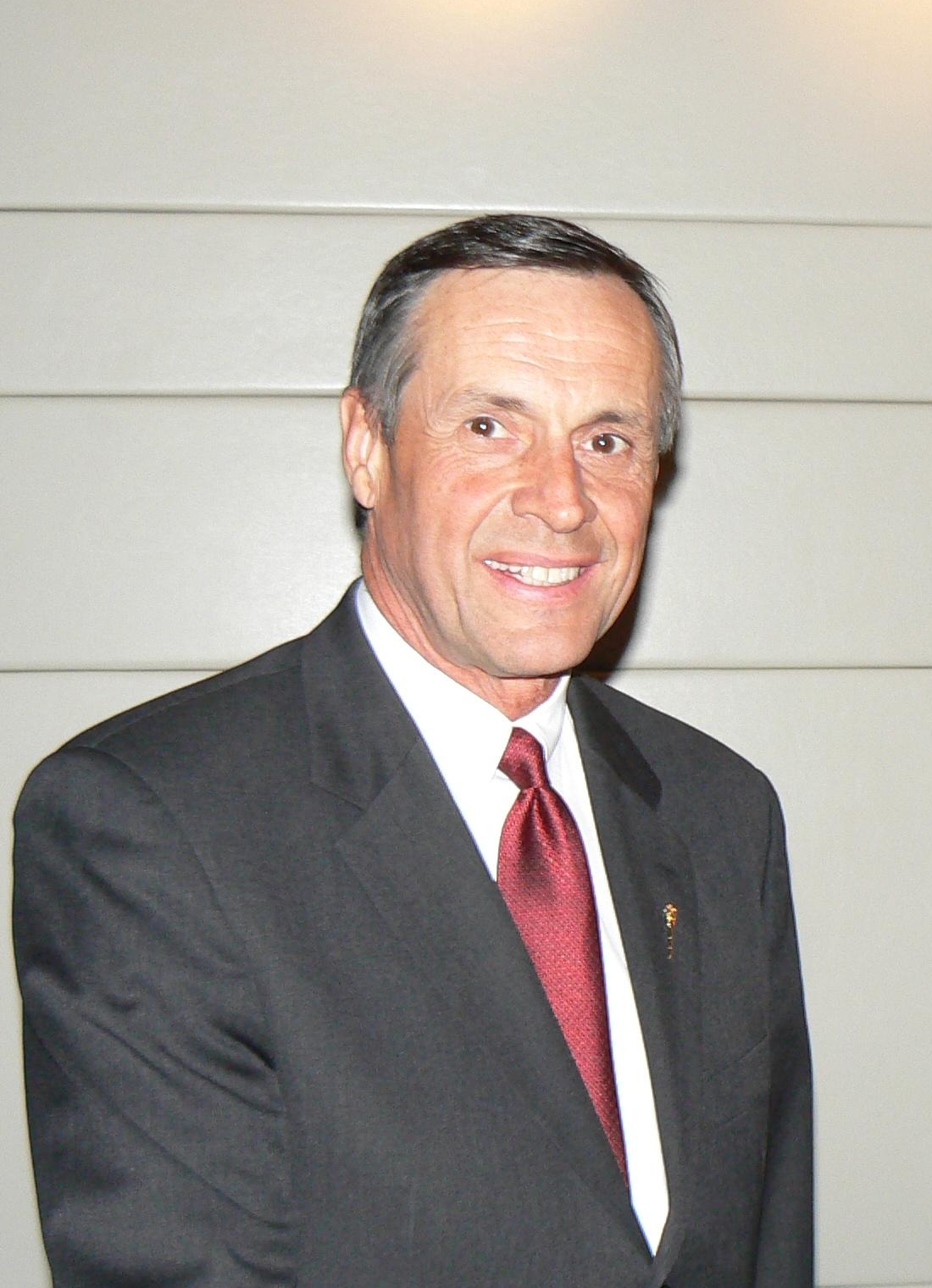

Member of the Saskatchewan Legislative Assembly for Saskatoon Southeast
- In office November 5, 2003 – October 1, 2024
- Preceded by: Pat Lorje
- Succeeded by: Brittney Senger

Deputy Premier of Saskatchewan
- In office August 23, 2016 – February 2, 2018
- Preceded by: Don McMorris
- Succeeded by: Gordon Wyant

Personal details
- Born: 1951 (age 74–75) Saskatoon, Saskatchewan
- Party: Saskatchewan Party
- Education: University of Saskatchewan
- Occupation: Lawyer
- Website: donmorgan.ca

Don Morgan KC (born 1951) is a Canadian provincial politician. He was the Saskatchewan Party member of the Legislative Assembly of Saskatchewan (MLA) for the constituency of Saskatoon Southeast from 2003 until 2024. Along with Donna Harpauer, he was the longest-serving sitting minister in Canada at the time he left the cabinet in August 2023, after announcing that he would not be seeking re-election.

Morgan was born in Saskatoon, Saskatchewan. He is a graduate of the University of Saskatchewan College of Law. He was appointed Queen's Counsel in 1990. He practiced law from 1979 until 1988, when he became chairman and CEO of the Saskatchewan Legal Aid Commission. Mr. Morgan again practiced law from 1992 to 2007.

Minister Morgan was first elected to the Saskatchewan Legislative Assembly in 2003 from Saskatoon Southeast constituency in 2003 and got re-elected again in 2007, 2011, 2016 and 2020 from the same seat. Mr. Morgan was first elected to the Saskatchewan Legislative Assembly in 2003. In Opposition, he served as Justice Critic, Deputy Critic for First Nations and Métis Relations, Opposition Deputy House Leader, and served on the Private Members' Bills Committee.

He was appointed Minister of Justice and Attorney General (JAG) in 2007. He also served as Minister responsible for SaskTel during his first term as Cabinet Minister. In June 2010, he was appointed Minister of Labour Relations and Workplace Safety (LRWS), a role he keeps today. In the May 2012 Cabinet shuffle, he gave up his JAG responsibilities and was appointed Minister of Advanced Education, in addition to his LRWS role. In the Cabinet shuffle of September 2013, Morgan relinquished his portfolio of Advanced Education, retained his position of Minister of Labour Relations and Workplace Safety, and added the position of Minister of Education. On August 23, 2016, Morgan was also appointed Deputy Premier, and in August 2017, he relinquished his Education portfolio and was re-appointed as Minister of Justice and Attorney General. Morgan was replaced as Deputy Premier by Gordon Wyant on February 2, 2018 following a cabinet shuffle due to Scott Moe's appointment as Premier.

He brought Clare's law in Saskatchewan and consolidated all the Labour and Workplace safety pieces into one piece of legislation which is now called Saskatchewan Employment Act. Over the years, he has appointed a growing number of Indigenous and first nations judges.

Morgan announced on August 25, 2023 that he would not seek re-election in the next general election. He was shuffled out of cabinet on August 29, 2023, but was appointed Provincial Secretary for the remainder of his term.

Saskatchewan provincial government of Scott Moe
Cabinet posts (4)
| Predecessor | Office | Successor |
|---|---|---|
| Tim McLeod | Provincial Secretary of Saskatchewan; August 29, 2023–November 7, 2024 | Jamie Martens |
| Joe Hargrave | Minister of Crown Investments; November 9, 2020–August 29, 2023 | Dustin Duncan |
| con'd from Wall Ministry | Minister of Labour Relations and Workplace Safety; February 2, 2018–August 29, 2023 | Don McMorris |
| con'd from Wall Ministry | Minister of Justice and Attorney General; February 2, 2018–November 9, 2020 | Gordon Wyant |
Saskatchewan provincial government of Brad Wall
Cabinet posts (4)
| Predecessor | Office | Successor |
| Frank Quennell; Gordon Wyant | Minister of Justice and Attorney General; November 21, 2007–May 25, 2012; August 30, 2017–February 2, 2018 | Gordon Wyant con'd into Moe Ministry |
| Rob Norris | Minister of Labour Relations and Workplace Safety; June 29, 2010–February 2, 2018 | con'd into Moe Ministry |
| Russ Marchuk | Minister of Education; September 13, 2013–August 30, 2017 | Bronwyn Eyre |
| Rob Norris | Minister of Advanced Education; May 25, 2012–September 13, 2013 | Rob Norris |
