= Warman, Saskatchewan =

City in Saskatchewan, Canada

Warman
- City
- City of Warman
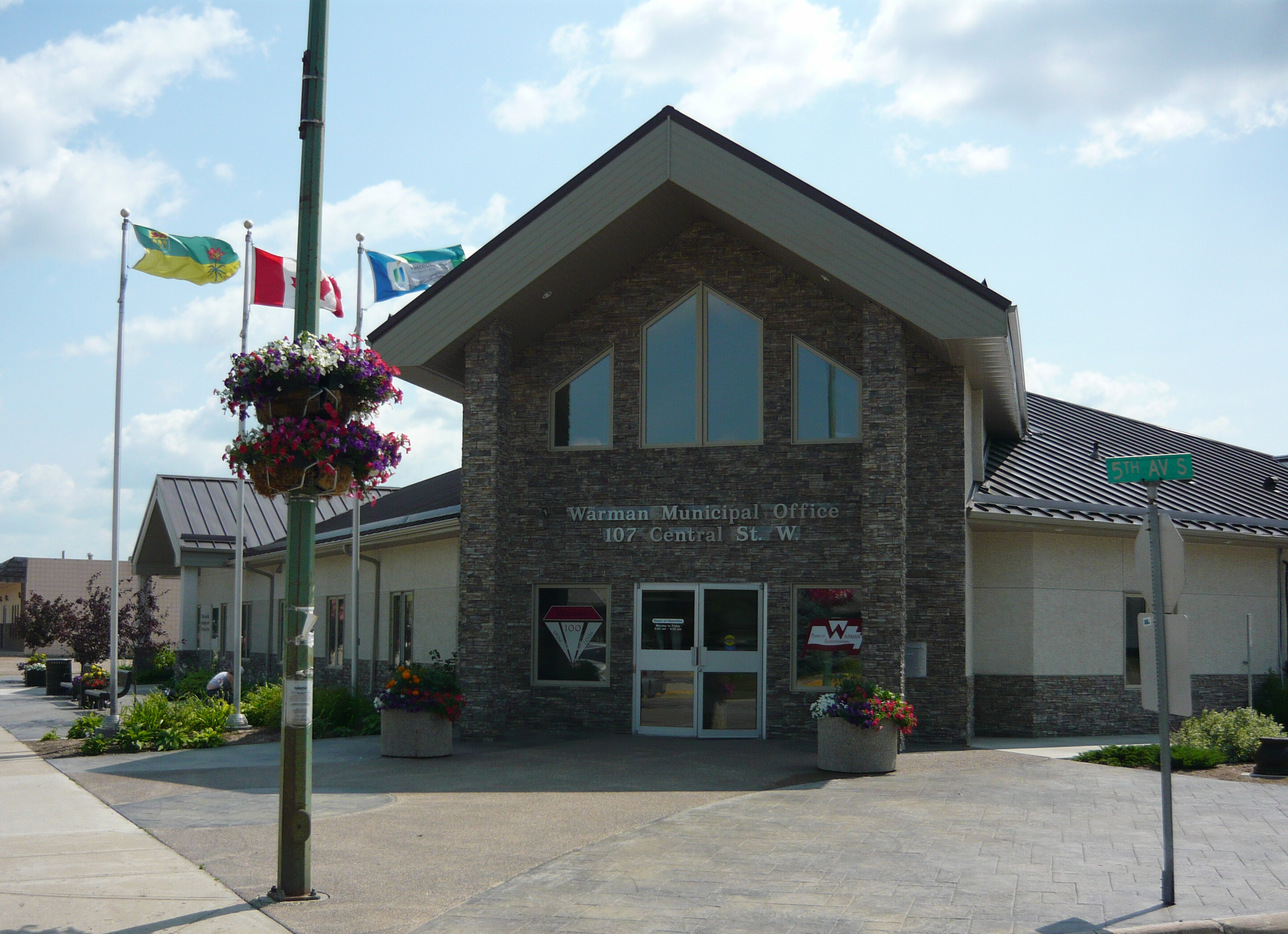
- Warman Municipal Office

- Flag

- Location within Corman Park No. 344 Location within Saskatchewan
- Coordinates: 52°19′19″N 106°35′03″W
- Country: Canada
- Province: Saskatchewan
- Metropolitan area: Saskatoon
- Rural municipality: Corman Park No. 344
- Established: 1904
- Incorporated: 1906 (village); 1927 (hamlet); 1962 (village)
- Town: 1966
- City: October 27, 2012

Government
  - Mayor: Gary Philipchuk
  - Governing body: Warman City Council: Kevin Tooley; Marshall Seed; Douglas Ramage; Richard Beck; Tracy Johnson; Shaun Cripps
  - MP (Carlton Trail—Eagle Creek): Kelly Block (CPC)
  - MLA (Warman): Terry Jenson (SKP)

Area
  - Land: 13.10 km^{2} (5.06 sq mi)
- Elevation: 508 m (1,667 ft)

Population (2021)
  - Total: 12,419
  - Density: 948.3/km^{2} (2,456/sq mi)
- Time zone: UTC-6 (CST)
- Postal code: S0K 4S0 & S0K 5S0
- Area code: +1-306
- Highways: Highway 11; Highway 305
- Website: City of Warman

Warman (/ˈwɔrmən/) is the ninth-largest city in the Canadian province of Saskatchewan. It is approximately 20 kilometres (12 mi) north of the city of Saskatoon, and 5 kilometres (3.1 mi) northeast of the city of Martensville. According to the 2021 census, Warman is the fastest growing municipality in Saskatchewan, and was the fastest growing municipality in Canada between 2011 and 2016. Warman is a bedroom community of Saskatoon. The current mayor is Gary Philipchuk.

Warman is the newest city in Saskatchewan, officially incorporated on October 27, 2012. Warman is surrounded by the Rural Municipality of Corman Park No. 344.

== History ==
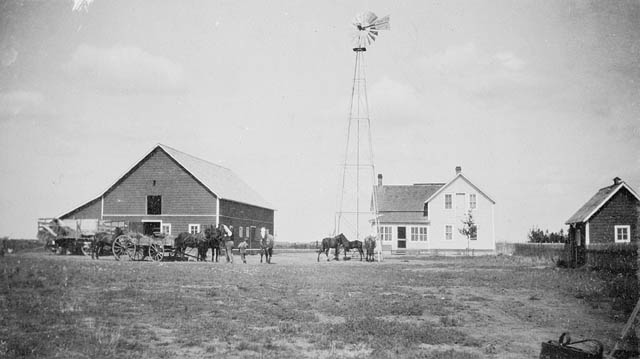
A. Buhler Farm near Warman, c. 1910

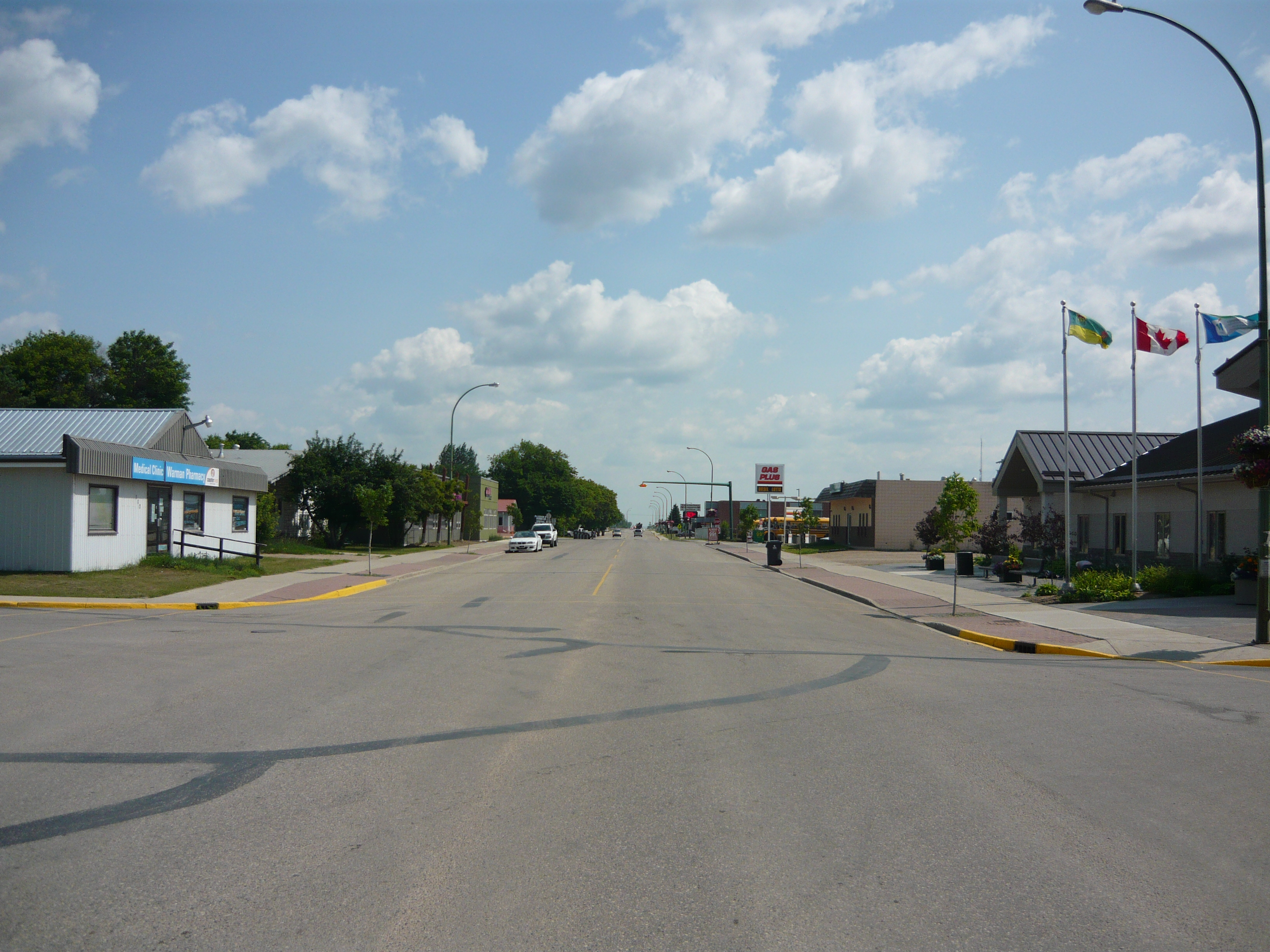
Central Street business district

Warman was first established in the fall of 1904 when the Canadian Northern Railway built its northern line (running from Humboldt to North Battleford) at the intersection with the Canadian Pacific Railway north–south line (running from Regina to Prince Albert). The original railway station was opened in the spring of 1907, and currently holds heritage status. Operational until 1942, the building now serves as a senior citizens' drop-in centre.

Informally called "Diamond" due to the diamond shape made by the intersecting railway tracks, the name of the settlement was soon changed to Warman, in honour of Cy Warman (from Illinois), a journalist, author, and poet who worked as a publicity writer for Canadian Northern and the Grand Trunk Pacific Railway documenting the railway expansion boom in western Canada.

Following the completion of the new railway, there was an inflow of settlers into the region, drawn by the promise of a quarter section of farmland for $10 as well as by the economic opportunities in the new community. The government, newspapers, and railways all promoted settlement, and Warman quickly developed into a thriving community with a school, churches, a bank, two hotels, a newspaper, a blacksmith shop, a shoe repair shop, many general stores and wooden pavements.

A fire in 1908, followed by a tornado in 1910, destroyed most of the newly created village, including most of Main Street, reducing the population. Main Street became a residential side street, as the residents opted to rebuild along Central Street instead. The population continued to decline in the aftermath of World War I and by 1927, the village had dropped to unincorporated hamlet status, having its administrative affairs handled by the Rural Municipality of Warman.

In the early 1950s Warman began to grow again, as one of the first bedroom communities of Saskatoon. By 1961, the population of Warman had reached 659, so it was decided in 1962 to reincorporate as a village, then as a town four years later. By 2011, the town grew to a population of 7,084. The town council applied for city status in 2012, which was approved by the provincial government in the summer of that year. Warman officially became a city on October 27, 2012.

== Demographics ==
In the 2021 Census of Population conducted by Statistics Canada, Warman had a population of 12,419 living in 4,162 of its 4,313 total private dwellings, a change of 12.7% from its 2016 population of 11,020. With a land area of 13.1 km^{2} (5.1 sq mi), it had a population density of 948.0/km^{2} (2,455.3/sq mi) in 2021.

Canada census – Warman, Saskatchewan community profile

	2016	2011
Population	11,020 (55.1% from 2011)	7,104 (48.5% from 2006)
Land area	13.05 km^{2} (5.04 sq mi)	8.54 km^{2} (3.30 sq mi)
Population density	844.6/km^{2} (2,188/sq mi)	829.7/km^{2} (2,149/sq mi)
Median age
Private dwellings	3,874 (total)	2,475 (total)
Median household income

References: 2016 2011

=== Ethnicity ===
Panethnic groups in the City of Warman (2001−2021)
Panethnic group	2021		2016		2011		2006		2001	
Panethnic group	Pop.	%	Pop.	%	Pop.	%	Pop.	%	Pop.	%
European (Note: Statistic includes all persons that did not make up part of a visible minority or an indigenous identity.)	10,245	84.15%	9,480	86.58%	6,360	90.47%	4,515	95.56%	3,365	97.82%
Indigenous	1,355	11.13%	905	8.26%	530	7.54%	185	3.92%	65	1.89%
South Asian	170	1.4%	140	1.28%	20	0.28%	0	0%	0	0%
Southeast Asian (Note: Statistic includes total responses of "Filipino" and "Southeast Asian" under visible minority section on census.)	165	1.36%	210	1.92%	90	1.28%	0	0%	0	0%
African	150	1.23%	95	0.87%	10	0.14%	10	0.21%	0	0%
Latin American	30	0.25%	65	0.59%	0	0%	10	0.21%	0	0%
East Asian (Note: Statistic includes total responses of "Chinese", "Korean", and "Japanese" under visible minority section on census.)	25	0.21%	40	0.37%	0	0%	10	0.21%	10	0.29%
Middle Eastern (Note: Statistic includes total responses of "West Asian" and "Arab" under visible minority section on census.)	0	0%	0	0%	0	0%	0	0%	0	0%
Other/multiracial (Note: Statistic includes total responses of "Visible minority, n.i.e." and "Multiple visible minorities" under visible minority section on census.)	0	0%	25	0.23%	0	0%	10	0.21%	0	0%
Total responses	12,175	98.04%	10,950	99.36%	7,030	98.96%	4,725	99.18%	3,440	98.82%
Total population	12,419	100%	11,020	100%	7,104	100%	4,764	100%	3,481	100%
Note: Totals greater than 100% due to multiple origin responses

== Education ==
Prairie Spirit School Division provides public education in Warman, and operates four schools in the city:

- Warman Elementary School
- Traditions Elementary School
- Warman Community Middle School
- Warman High School

Greater Saskatoon Catholic Schools operates one school in the city:

- Holy Trinity Catholic School

Great Plains College, offering post-secondary education, has one campus in the city.

== Media ==
Due to its proximity to Saskatoon, Warman receives radio and television broadcasts from the city. Warman has a local newspaper, the Clark's Crossing Gazette, which also serves Martensville and other surrounding areas.

== Sports ==
On February 18, 2025, the SJHL Board of Governors announced that the Notre Dame Hounds were to be replaced by a new franchise in Warman with official approval announced on June 7, 2025. The move saw the Notre Dame Hounds active players and list assets transferred to the new franchise in Warman.

Prior to official approval, the Warman Wolverines team name, colours, logos, and jersey concepts were announced on March 10, 2025.

Sports teams
Club	Type	League	Venue	Established	Championships
Warman Wolverines	Ice Hockey	SJHL	Warman Home Centre Communiplex	2025	0

== Infrastructure ==
=== Transportation ===
Warman is situation on the Louis Riel Trail (Highway 11), which links Saskatoon to Prince Albert. Highways 305 and 784 provide access to Martensville to the west. The closest major airport is the Saskatoon John G. Diefenbaker International Airport.

== Notable people ==
Ed Dyck, former NHL hockey player, was born in Warman.

== See also ==
- List of cities in Saskatchewan
- List of communities in Saskatchewan
