= Nancy Heppner =

Canadian politician

The Honourable Nancy Heppner ECS

Member of the Saskatchewan Legislative Assembly for Martensville-Warman Martensville (2007-2016)
- In office March 5, 2007 – September 29, 2020
- Preceded by: Ben Heppner
- Succeeded by: Terry Jenson

Personal details
- Born: 1971 (age 54–55) Swift Current, Saskatchewan
- Party: Saskatchewan Party
- Parent: Ben Heppner (father)
- Profession: teacher

Nancy Heppner (born 1971) is a former Saskatchewan Party member of the Legislative Assembly of Saskatchewan, who represented the constituency of Martensville-Warman and its predecessor Martensville from 2007 to 2020.

== Early life ==
She was born in Swift Current, and graduated from high school in 1989.

She went on to postsecondary education at the University of British Columbia.

== Political career ==
Heppner got involved in politics in 1995, doorknocking for her father Ben Heppner. In 2000 she became the executive assistant for Member of Parliament Carol Skelton. She then moved on as Question Period coordinator for Stephen Harper until 2005.

Nancy worked for the Honourable Bev Oda (Minister of Canadian Heritage; MP for Durham) as her Director of Communications in early 2006.

Her father died from cancer in 2006 and was the previous MLA for Martensville. Heppner won a by-election for the electoral district of Martensville with 77% of the vote on March 5, 2007 for the Saskatchewan Party.

She became the first woman in Saskatchewan history to directly succeed her father as a representative in the Legislative Assembly for the same constituency, and the second woman to follow in her father's footsteps as an MLA.

Heppner was named Environment Critic by the leader of Her Majesty's Loyal Opposition, Brad Wall on March 12, 2007.

Heppner retained her seat in the general election of November 7, 2007, capturing 73.5% of the vote. She was sworn into the new Saskatchewan Party cabinet as Minister of the Environment on November 21, 2007.

On June 29, 2010 she was shuffled out of cabinet. Heppner served in cabinet several times again for various portfolios, and left cabinet for the final time in February 2018.

Heppner did not seek re-election in the 2020 Saskatchewan general election.

== Cabinet positions ==
Saskatchewan provincial government of Brad Wall
Cabinet posts (4)
Predecessor	Office	Successor
Dustin Duncan	Minister of Energy & Resources; August 30, 2017–February 2, 2018	Bronwyn Eyre
Don McMorris	Minister of Highways and Infrastructure; June 5, 2014–August 23, 2016	Dave Marit
Laura Ross	Minister of Central Services; May 25, 2012–June 5, 2014	Jennifer Campeau
John Nilson	Minister of the Environment; November 21, 2007–June 29, 2010	Dustin Duncan
