= List of Saskatchewan CCF/NDP members =

This is a list of members of the Saskatchewan, Canada, branch of the Co-operative Commonwealth Federation (CCF), a social democratic political party, and its successor, the Saskatchewan New Democratic Party (NDP).

== 1929 general election ==
- Jacob Benson - Last Mountain - 1929 (Progressive, joined FLG after 1931) -1934 (def. as FLP) 1938-1944-1948-1952 (Left CCF ran as Independent, CCF Won)

== 1934 general election ==
Contested by the Farmer-Labour Group which was founded in 1931 and, with the creation of the CCF in 1932, became its unofficial Saskatchewan wing. Jacob Benson, who had been elected as a Progressive in 1929, broke with the party after it joined the Conservatives to form a coalition government and joined the Farmer-Labour Group after it was formed becoming its first MLA. In the 1934 election under M.J. Coldwell the FLG elected 5 MLAs becoming the official opposition to the Liberal government of James Garfield Gardiner; though Coldwell himself did not win a seat. In 1935, it changed its name and officially became the Saskatchewan section of the CCF and changed its name.

- George Hara Williams - Wadena - (FLG) 1934 (CCF) 1938-1944-1945by (Deceased, CCF Won)
- H.H. Kemper - Gull Lake - (FLG) 1934
- Louis Henry Hantelman - Elrose - (FLG) 1934 (CCF) 1938-1944 (Retired, CCF won)
- Clarence Stork - Shaumavon - (FLG) 1934
- A.J. Macauley - Cut Knife - (FLG) 1934

== 1938 general election ==
The CCF won ten of the 52 seats (2 FLG MLAs were re-elected and joined by 8 new MLAs) available in the 1938 election, June 8, 1938.

- John Allan Young - Biggar - 1938-1944 (Retired, CCF won)
- Myron Henry Feeley - Canora - 1938-1944-1948 (Retired, CCF won)
- Peter Anton Howe - Kelvington - 1938-1944-1948-1952-1956-1960 (Retired, CCF Won)
- Oakland Woods Valleau - Melfort - 1938-1944-1948 (Defeated, CCF Lost)
- Joseph Lee Phelps - Saltcoasts - 1938-1944-1948 (Defeated, CCF Lost)
- John Hewgill Brockelbank - Tisdale - 1938-1944-1948-1952, Kelsey 1952-1956-1960-1964-1967 (Retired, NDP Won)
- Tom Johnston - Touchwood - 1938-1944-1948-1952-1956 (Retired, CCF Won)

== 1938 (August 4) by-election ==
- +1 Pick up

- Joseph William Burton - Humboldt - 1938by-1944 (Became MP, CCF Won), 1952-1956 (Defeated, CCF Lost)

== 1944 general election ==
The CCF won 42 of the 52 seats available in the 1944 election, June 15, 1944. CCF leader Tommy Douglas became Premier, the first time the CCF was able to form government in any jurisdiction.

- Allan Lister Samuel Brown - Bengough - 1944-1948-1952-1956-1960 (Retired, CCF Won)
- Woodrow Stanley Lloyd - Biggar - 1944-1948-1952-1956-1960-1964-1967-1971 (Retired, NDP won)
- Leslie Walter Lee - Cumberland - 1944-1948 (?, CCF Lost)
- Isidore Charles Nollet - Cut Knife - 1944-1948-1952-1956-1960-1964-1967 (Retired, NDP Won)
- Maurice John Willis - Elrose - 1944-1948-1952-1956-1960 (Retired, CCF Won)
- Henry Edmund Houze - Gravelbourg - 1944-1948 (CCF Lost)
- Alvin Cecil Murray - Gull Lake - 1944-1948-1949by (?, CCF Won)
- James Smith Aitken - Hanley - 1944-1948 (?, CCF Won)
- Ben Putnam - Humboldt - 1944-1948 (?, CCF Lost)
- John Wellbelove - Kerrobert-Kindersley - 1944-1948-1952-1956 (Retired, CCF won)
- William James Boyle - Kinistino - 1944-1948 (?, CCF Lost)
- William Sancho Thair - Lumsden - 1944-1948-1952-1956 (Retired, CCF won)
- Beatrice Janet Trew - Maple Creek - 1944-1948 (Defeated, CCF Lost)
- Herschel Lee Howell - Meadow Lake - 1944-1948 (?, CCF Lost)
- William James Arthurs - Melville - 1944-1948 (?, CCF Lost)
- Frank Keem Malcolm - Milestone - 1944-1948 (?, CCF Won)
- John Wesley Corman - Moose Jaw City (2 of 2 seats) - 1944-1948-1952-1956 (Retired, CCF won)
- Dempster Henry Ratcliffe Heming - Moose Jaw City (2 of 2 seats) - 1944-1948-1952-1956-1960 (Retired, CCF Won)
- Sidney Merlin Spidell - Morse - 1944-1946by (?, CCF Won)
- Niles Leonard Buchanan - Notukeu-Willow Bunch - 1944-1948-1952-1956 (Retired, CCF Lost)
- Dan Daniels - Pelly - 1944-1948 (?, CCF Lost)
- Lachlan Fraser McIntosh - Prince Albert - 1944-1948-1952-1956-1960-1962by (Deceased, CCF Lost)
- Warden Burgess - Qu’Appelle-Wolseley - 1944-1948 (Defeated, CCF Lost)
- Dmytro Matthew Lazorko - Redberry - 1944-1948 (?, CCF Lost)
- Charles Cromwell Williams - Regina City (2 of 2 seats) - 1944-1948-1952, (3 of 3 seats) 1952-1956-1960, (4 of 4 Seats) 1960-1964 (Retired, CCF won 5/6)
- Clarence Melvin Fines - Regina City (2 of 2 seats) - 1944-1948—1952, (3 of 3 seats) 1952-1956-1960 (Retired, CCF Won)
- John Taylor Douglas - Rosetown - 1944-1948-1952-1956-1960 (Retired, CCF won)
- John Henry Sturdy - Saskatoon City (2 of 2 seats) - 1944-1948-1952-1956-1960 (Retired, CCF Won)
- Arthur Thomas Stone - Saskatoon City (2 of 2 seats) - 1944-1948-1952-1956-1960, (3 of 3 Seats) 1960-1964 (Retired, CCF won 4/5)
- Albert Victor Sterling - Shellbrook - 1944-1945by (?, CCF won)
- Charles David Cuming - Souris-Estevan - 1944-1948 (?, CCF Lost)
- Harry Gibbs - Swift Current - 1944-1948-1952-1956 (Retired, CCF Won)
- Alexander Duff Connon - The Battlefords - 1944-1948 (?, CCF Lost)
- John Bruce Harris - Torch River - 1944-1948 (?, CCF Won)
- Bob Wooff - Turtleford - 1944-1948 (defeated, CCF Lost) 1952-1956 (Defeated, CCF Lost), 1960-1961by (Defeated, CCF Lost), 1964-1967-1971 (Retired, NDP Won)
- James Andrew Darling - Watrous - 1944-1948-1952-1956-1960 (Retired, CCF Won)
- Thomas Clement Douglas - Weyburn - 1944-1948-1952-1956-1960-1961by (Became Federal NDP Leader, CCF Lost)
- Hans Ove Hansen - Wilkie - 1944-1948 (?, CCF Lost)
- Arthur Percy Swallow - Yorkton - 1944-1948-1952-1956 (Retired, CCF Won)

== 1945 (June 29) by-election ==
- Switch

- Guy Franklin Van Eaton - Shellbrook - 1945by-1948 (?, CCF Won)

== 1945 (November 21) by-election ==
- Switch

- Frederick Arthur Dewhurst - Wadena - 1945by-1948-1952-1956-1960-1964-1967-1971-1975 (Retired, NDP Won Quill Lakes)

== 1946 (June 27) by-election ==
- Switch

- James William Gibson - Morse - 1946by-1948-1952-1956-1960 (?, CCF Lost)

== 1948 general election ==
The CCF was re-elected, winning 31 of the 52 seats available in the 1948 election, June 24, 1948, a loss of 16 seats.

- Alex Gordon Kuziak - Canora - 1948-1952-1956-1960-1964 (Defeated, CCF Lost)
- Robert Alexander Walker - Hanley - 1948-1952-1956-1960-1964, 1964by-1967 (Defeated, NDP Lost)
- Jacob Walter Erb - Milestone - 1948-1952-1956-1960-1964 (Became Liberal defeated in Regina East, CCF Lost)
- Louis William Larsen - Shellbrook - 1948-1952-1956 (?, CCF Won)
- John Robert Denike - Torch River - 1948-1952 (?, CCF Lost Nipawin)

== 1949 (November 10) by-election ==
- Switch

- Thomas John Bentley - Gull Lake 1949by-1952, Shaunavon - 1952-1956-1960 (Retired, CCF Won)

== 1951 (July 10) by-election ==
- +1 Pick Up

- Edward Hazen Walker - Gravelbourg - 1951by-1952-1956 (?, CCF Lost)

== 1952 general election ==
The CCF government under Tommy Douglas won 42 of the 53 seats available in the 1952 election, June 11, 1952, a gain of 11 seats from the previous election.

- Bill Berezowsky - Cumberland - 1952-1956-1960-1964-1967, Prince Albert East-Cumberland 1967-1971 (Retired, NDP Won)
- Henry Begrand - Kinistino - 1952-1956-1959by (Deceased, CCF Won)
- Russell Brown - Last Mountain - 1952-1956-1960-1964 (defeated, CCF Lost), Souris-Estevan 1971-1971by (Deceased, NDP Won)
- Clarence George Willis - Melfort-Tisdale - 1952-1956-1960-1964-1967-1971 (Retired, NDP Won)
- A. Percy Brown - Melville - 1952-1956 (?, CCF Lost)
- Arnold Feusi - Pelly - 1952-1956 (?, CCF Lost)
- William Henry Wahl - Qu’Appelle-Wolseley - 1952-1956 (?, CCF Lost)
- Dmytro Zipchen - Redberry - 1952-1956 (?, CCF Lost)
- Marjorie Alexandra Cooper - Regina City (3 of 3 Seats) - 1952-1956-1960, (4 of 4 Seats) 1960-1964, Regina West (2 of 2 Seats) 1964-1967 (Retired, NDP Won 4/6)
- Eiling Kramer - the Battlefords - 1952-1956-1960-1964-1967-1971-1975-1978-1980by (Retired, NDP Won)
- Bob Wooff - Turtleford - 1952-1956 (Defeated, CCF Lost), 1960-1961by (Defeated, CCF Lost), 1964-1967-1971 (Retired, NDP Won)

== 1956 general election ==
The CCF was re-elected with 36 of the 53 seats available in the 1956 election, June 20, 1956, a loss of six seats.

- John James Harrop - Athabasca - 1956-1960 (Retired, CCF Lost)
- Eldon Arthur Johnson - Kerrobert-Kindersley - 1956-1960-1964 (?, CCF Lost)
- Clifford Honey Thurston - Lumsden - 1956-1960-1964 (defeated, CCF Lost)
- William Gwynne Davies - Moose Jaw City (2 of 2 seats) - 1956-1960-1964-1967, Moose Jaw South 1967-1971 (Retired, NDP Won)
- John Thiessen - Shellbrook - 1956-1960-1964 (?, CCF Lost)
- Kim Thorson - Souris-Estevan - 1956-1960 (Defeated, CCF Lost), 1971by-1975 (Defeated, NDP Lost)
- Everett Irvine Wood - Swift Current - 1956-1960-1964-1967-1971-1975 (Retired, NDP Lost)
- Frank Meakes - Touchwood - 1956-1960-1964 (?, CCF Lost), 1967-1971-1975 (Retired, NDP Won Quill Lakes)
- Frederick Neibrandt - Yorkton - 1956-1960 (?, CCF Lost)

== 1959 (June 3) by-election ==
- Switch

- Arthur Thibault - Kinistino - 1959by-1960-1964-1967-1971, Melfort-Kinistino 1971-1975, Kinistino 1975-1978-1982 (Retired, NDP won)

== 1960 general election ==
The CCF was re-elected with 37 of the 54 seats available in the 1960 election, June 8, 1960, a gain of one seat.

- Hjalmar Reinhold Dahlman - Bengough - 1960-1964 (Defeated, CCF Lost)
- Olaf Alexander Turnbull - Elrose - 1960-1964 (Defeated, CCF Lost)
- Clifford Benjamin Peterson - Kelvington - 1960-1964 (Lost CCF nomination, CCF Lost)
- Martin Semchuk - Meadow Lake - 1960-1964 (Defeated, CCF Lost)
- Gordon Taylor Snyder - Moose Jaw City (2 of 2 seats) - 1960-1964-1967, Moose Jaw North 1967-1971, Moose Jaw South 1971-1975-1978-1982 (Defeated, NDP Lost)
- Robert Irvin Perkins - Nipawin - 1960-1964 (Defeated, CCF Lost)
- Dick Michayluk - Redberry - 1960-1964-1967-1971-1975 (Retired, NDP won)
- Allan Blakeney - Regina City (4 of 4 Seats) - 1960-1964, Regina West (2 of 2 Seats) 1964-1967, Regina Centre 1967-1971-1975, Regina Elphinstone 1975-1978-1982-1986-1988by (Retired, NDP Won)
- Edward Charles Whelan - Regina City (4 of 4 Seats) - 1960-1964, Regina North 1964-1967, Regina North West 1967-1971-1975-1978-1979by (Retired, NDP Won)
- Allan Leonard Frederick Stevens - Rosetown - 1960-1964 (?, CCF Lost)
- Alexander Malcolm Nicholson - Saskatoon City (3 of 3 Seats) - 1960-1964, (4 of 5 Seats) 1964-1967 (?, NDP Won 2/5)
- Gladys Strum - Saskatoon City (3 of 3 Seats) - 1960-1964-1967 (Defeated, CCF Won 4/5)
- Arthur Kluzak - Shaunavon - 1960-1964 (?, CCF Lost)
- Hans Broten - Watrous - 1960-1964-1967 (Defeated, NDP Lost)

February 22, 1961 by-election -1 seat

December 13, 1961 by-election -1 seat

November 14, 1962 by-election -1 seat

== 1964 general election ==
The CCF-NDP won 25 of the 58 seats available in the 1964 election, April 22, 1964, eleven fewer than in the previous election. The government of Woodrow Lloyd, who had succeeded Douglas in 1961, was defeated.

- Leonard Larson - Pelly - 1964-1967, 1971-1975-1977by (Deceased, NDP Won)
- Henry Harold Peter Baker - Regina East (2 of 2 Seats) - 1964-1967, Regina South East 1967-1971, Regina Wascana 1971-1975, Regina Victoria 1975-1978-1982 (Defeated, NDP Lost)
- Walter Smishek - Regina East (2 of 2 Seats) - 1964-1967, Regina North East 1967-1971-1975-1978-1982 (Defeated, NDP Lost)
- John Edward Brockelbank - Saskatoon City (4 of 5 Seats) 1964-1967, Saskatoon Mayfair 1967-1971, Saskatoon Mayfair 1971-1975, Saskatoon Westmount 1975-1978-1982, 1986-1991 (Retired, NDP Won)
- Wesley Albert Robbins - Saskatoon City (4 of 5 Seats) 1964-1967), Saskatoon Nutana Centre 1971-1975, Saskatoon Nutana 1975-1978-1982 (Retired, NDP Lost)
- Harry David Link - Saskatoon City (4 of 5 Seats) 1964-1967 (Defeated in Rosetown, NDP Lost)
- James Auburn Pepper - Weyburn - 1964-1967-1971-1975-1978-1982 (Retired, NDP Lost)

== 1964 (December 16) by-election ==
- Switch/Return of Robert Alexander Walker

== 1967 general election ==
The NDP won 24 of the 59 seats available in the 1967 election, October 11, 1967.

- Al Matsalla - Canora - 1967-1971-1975-1978-1982 (Retired, NDP Lost)
- Miro Kwasnica - Cut Knife - 1967-1971-1975, Cut Knife-Lloydminster 1975-1978 (Retired, NDP won)
- John Rissler Messer - Kelsey - 1967-1971, Tisdale-Kelsey 1971-1975, Kelsey-Tisdale 1975-1978-1908by (Retired, NDP Lost)
- John Russell Kowalchuk - Melville - 1967-1971-1975-1978-1982 (?, NDP Lost)
- Roy John Romanow - Saskatoon Riversdale - 1967-1971-1975-1978-1982, 1986-1991-1995-1999-2001by (Retired, NDP Won)
- George Reginald Anderson Bowerman - Shellbrook - 1967-1971-1975-1978-1982 (?, NDP Lost)

== 1969 (June 25) by-election ==
- +1 Pick Up

- Neil Erland Byers - Kelvington - 1969by-1971-1975, Kelvington-Wadena 1975-1978-1982 (Defeated, NDP Lost)

== 1971 general election ==
The NDP won 45 of the 60 seats available in the 1971 election, June 3, 1971, forming government with Allan Blakeney becoming Premier.

- Donald Leonard Faris - Arm River - 1971-1975-1978 (Defeated, NDP Lost)
- David Hadley Lange - Assiniboia-Bengough - 1971-1975, Bengough-Milestone 1975-1978 (?, NDP Lost)
- Elwood Lorrie Cowley - Biggar - 1971-1975-1978-1982 (Defeated, NDP Lost)
- Hayden William Owens - Elrose - 1971-1975 (?, NDP Lost)
- Reginald John Gross - Gravelbourg - 1971-1975 (Defeated, NDP Lost), Morse 1978-1982 (Defeated, NDP Lost)
- Paul Peter Mostoway - Hanley - 1971-1975, Saskatoon Centre 1975-1978-1982 (?, NDP Lost)
- Edwin Tchorzewski - Humboldt - 1971-1975-1978-1982 (Defeated, NDP Lost), Regina North East 1985by-1986-1991, Regina Dewdney 1991-1995-1999by (Retired, NDP Won)
- Alex Taylor - Kerrobert-Kindersley - 1971-1975 (Defeated, NDP Lost)
- Gordon MacMurchy - Last Mountain - 1971-1975, Last Mountain-Touchwood 1975-1978-1982 (Defeated, NDP Lost)
- Gene Flasch - Maple Creek - 1971-1975 (?, NDP Lost)
- John Kristian Comer - Nipawin - 1971-1975 (Defeated, NDP Lost)
- Allen Willard Engel - Notukeu-Willow Bunch - 1971-1975 (Defeated, NDP Lost), Assiniboia-Gravelbourg 1978-1982-1986 (Defeated, NDP Lost)
- Mike Feschuk - Prince Albert East 1971-1975, Prince Albert 1975-1978-1982 (?, NDP Lost)
- Terry Lyle Hanson - Qu’Appelle-Wolseley - 1971-1975 (?, NDP Lost)
- Ed Kaeding - Saltcoats - 1971-1975-1978-1982 (Defeated, NDP Lost)
- Beverly Milton Dyck - Saskatoon City Park - 1971-1975, Saskatoon Mayfair 1975-1978-1982 (?, NDP Lost)
- Herman Rolfes - Saskatoon Nutana South - 1971-1975, Saskatoon Buena Vista 1975-1978-1982 (Defeated, NDP Lost), Saskatoon South 1986-1991, Saskatoon Nutana 1991-1995 (Retired, NDP Won)
- John Richards - Saskatoon University - 1971-1975 (Became Waffle MLA ran and defeated, NDP Lost)
- Allan Roy Oliver - Shaunavon - 1971-1975 (Defeated, NDP Lost)
- Michael Feduniak - Turtleford - 1971-1975 (?, NDP Won)
- Donald William Cody - Watrous - 1971-1975 (?, ?), Kinistino 1978-1982 (?, NDP Lost)
- Irving Wensley Carlson - Yorkton - 1971-1975 (Retired, NDP Won)

== 1971 (December 1) by-election ==
- Switch/Return of Kim Thorson

- (See Above)

== 1975 general election ==
The NDP was re-elected, with 39 of the 61 seats available in the 1975 election, June 11, 1975, a loss of two seats from the previous election.

- Frederick John Thompson - Athabasca - 1975-1978-1982-1986-1991-1995 (Defeated, NDP Lost)
- Norman H. MacAuley - Cumberland - 1975-1978-1982 (Retired, NDP Won)
- Gordon James McNeill - Meadow Lake - 1975-1978 (?, NDP Lost)
- Norman Vickar - Melfort - 1975-1978-1982 (?, NDP Lost)
- John Skoberg - Moose Jaw North - 1975-1978-1982 (?, NDP Lost)
- Murray Koskie - Quill Lakes - 1975-1978-1982-1986-1991-1995 (Retired, NDP Won Last Mountain-Touchwood)
- Dennis Banda - Redberry 1975-1978-1982 (?, NDP Lost)
- Ned Shillington - Regina Centre - 1975-1978-1982-1986-1991, Regina Churchill Downs 1991-1995, Regina Northeast 1995-1999 (Retired, NDP Won)
- Bill Allen - Regina Rosemont - 1975-1978-1982 (Defeated, NDP Lost)
- Lloyd Johnson - Turtleford - 1975-1978-1982 (Defeated, NDP Lost), 1991–1995, Shellbrook-Spiritwood 1995-1999 (Defeated, NDP Lost)
- Randall Neil Nelson - Yorkton - 1975-1978-1982 (?, NDP Lost)

== 1977 (June 8) by-election ==
- Switch

- Norm Lusney - Pelly - 1977by-1978-1982-1986 (Defeated, NDP Lost)

== 1978 general election ==
The NDP was re-elected with 44 of the 61 seats available in the 1978 election, October 18, 1978, gaining five seats.

- Robert Gavin Long - Cut Knife-Lloydminster - 1978-1982 (defeated, NDP Lost)
- Jerome Hammersmith - Prince Albert-Duck Lake - 1978-1982-1983by (Defeated, NDP Lost)
- Douglas Francis McArthur - Regina Lakeview 1978-1982 (Defeated, NDP Lost)
- Clinton Oliver White - Regina Wascana - 1978-1982 (Defeated, NDP Lost)
- Bernard John Poniatowski - Saskatoon Eastview 1978-1982 (Defeated, NDP Lost)
- Peter Prebble - Saskatoon Sutherland 1978-1982 (Defeated, NDP Lost), Saskatoon University 1986-1991 (Defeated, NDP Lost Saskatoon Greystone), Saskatoon Greystone 1999-2007 (Retired, NDP Lost)
- Dwain Lingenfelter - Shaunavon - 1978-1982-1986 Defeated, NDP Lost), Regina Elphinstone 1988by-1991-1995-1999-2001by (Retired, NDP Won), Regina Douglas Park 2009by-2011 (Defeated, NDP Lost)

== 1979 (October 17) by-election ==
- Switch

- John Solomon - Regina North West 1979by-1982 (?, NDP Lost), 1986-1991-1994by (Ran Federally, NDP Lost)

== 1980 (November 26) by-elections ==
- -1, +1, 1 Switch

- John Otho Chapman - Estevan - 1980by-1982 (Defeated, NDP Lost)
- David Manly Miner - the Battlefords - 1980by-1982 (Defeated, NDP Lost)

== 1982 general election ==
The NDP government of Allan Blakeney was defeated, winning 9 of the 64 seats available in the 1982 election, April 26, 1982, a loss of 35 seats.

- Lawrence Yew - Cumberland - 1982-1986 (Retired, NDP Won)

February 21, 1983 by-election -1 seat

== 1985 (November 25) by-elections ==
- +1 Pick Up/Return

- (see above)

== 1986 general election ==
The NDP won 25 of the 64 seats available in the 1986 election, October 20, 1986, a gain of 17 seats.

- Keith Goulet - Cumberland 1986-1991-1995-1999-2003 (Retired, NDP Won)
- Eric Upshall - Humboldt - 1986-1991-1995, Watrous 1995-1999 (Defeated, NDP Lost)
- Glenn Hagel - Moose Jaw North 1986-1991, Moose Jaw Palliser 1991-1995, Moose Jaw North 1995-1999-2003-2007 (Defeated, NDP Lost)
- Lorne Calvert - Moose Jaw South 1986-1991, Moose Jaw Wakamow 1991-1995-1999 (Retired, NDP Won), Saskatoon Riversdale 2001by-2003-2007-2009by (Retired NDP Won)
- Myron Kowalsky - Prince Albert 1986-1991, Prince Albert Carlton 1991-1995-1999-2003-2007 (Retired, NDP Lost)
- Eldon Lautermilch - Prince Albert Duck Lake 1986-1991, Prince Albert Northcote 1991-1995-1999-2003-2007 (Retired, NDP Won)
- Rose Marie Simard - Regina Lakeview 1986-1991, Regina Hillsdale 1991-1995 (Retired, NDP Won)
- Kim Trew - Regina North 1986-1991, Regina Albert North 1991-1995, Regina Coronation Park 1995-1999-2003-2007–2011 (Retired NDP Lost)
- Robert Lyons - Regina Rosemont 1986-1991-1995 (Retired, NDP Won)
- Harry Van Mulligen - Regina Victoria 1986-1991-1995-1999, Regina Douglas Park 2003-2007-2009by (Retired, NDP Won)
- Anne Smart - Saskatoon Centre 1986-1991 (Lost NDP Nomination, NDP Won)
- Bob Mitchell - Saskatoon Fairview 1986-1991-1995-1999by (Retired, NDP Won)
- Pat Atkinson - Saskatoon Nutana 1986-1991, Saskatoon Broadway 1991-1995, Saskatoon Nutana 1995-1999-2003-2007–2011 (Retired NDP Won)
- Mark Koenker - Saskatoon Sutherland 1986-1991, Saskatoon Sutherland-University 1991-1995, Saskatoon Sutherland 1995-1999 (Retired, NDP Won)
- Douglas Anguish - the Battlefords 1986-1991-1995, North Battleford 1995-1996by (Retired, NDP Lost)

== 1988 (May4th) by-elections ==
- +1 Pick Up, 1 Switch/Return

- Bob Pringle - Saskatoon Eastview 1988by-1991, Saskatoon Eastview-Haultain 1991-1995, Saskatoon Eastview 1995-1998by (Retired, NDP Won)

== 1991 general election ==
The NDP under Roy Romanow formed government winning 55 of the 66 seats available in the 1991 election, October 21, 1991, a gain of 29 seats.

- Lewis Draper - Assiniboia-Gravelbourg - 1991-1995 (Defeated in Thunder Creek, NDP Lost Wood River)
- Judy Bradley - Bengough-Milestone 1991-1995, Weyburn Big Muddy 1995-1999 (Defeated, NDP Lost)
- Grant Whitmore - Biggar 1991-1995, Saskatoon Northwest 1995-1999 (Defeated, NDP Lost)
- Darrel Cunningham - Canora - 1991-1995 (Defeated, NDP Lost)
- Violet Stanger - Cut Knife-Lloydminster 1991-1995, Lloydminster 1995-1999 (Defeated, NDP Lost)
- Lorne Scott - Indian Head-Wolseley 1991-1995-1999 (Defeated, NDP Lost)
- Andy Renaud - Kelsey-Tisdale 1991 Carrot River Valley 1995 (Defeated, NDP Lost)
- Kenneth Kluz - Kelvington-Wadena 1991-1995 (Lost NDP Nomination, NDP Lost)
- Armand Roy - Kinistino 1991-1995 (Defeated, NDP Lost)
- Dale Flavel - Last Mountain-Touchwood 1991-1995-1999 (Defeated, NDP Lost)
- Maynard Sonntag - Meadow Lake 1991-1995-1999-2003-2007 (Defeated, NDP Lost)
- Carol Carson - Melfort 1991-1995 (Defeated, NDP Lost)
- Evan Carlson - Melville 1991-1995 (Defeated, NDP Lost)
- Tom Keeping - Nipawin 1991-1995 (Ridings Merged, NDP Won)
- Ron Harper - Pelly 1991-1995 (Defeated, NDP Lost), Regina Northeast 1999-2003-2007–2011 (Retired, NDP Lost)
- Suzanne Murray - Qu’Appelle-Lumsden - 1991-1995, Regina Qu'Appelle Valley 1995-1999 (Retired, NDP Won)
- Walter Jess - Redberry 1991-1995, Redberry Lake 1995-1999 (Defeated, NDP Lost)
- Serge Kujawa - Regina Albert South 1991-1995 (Retired, NDP Won)
- Joanne Crofford - Regina Lake Centre 1991-1995, Regina Centre 1995-1999- Regina Rosemont 2003-2007 (Retired, NDP Won)
- Doreen Hamilton - Regina Wascana Plains 1991-1995-1999-2003-2007 (Retired, NDP Lost)
- Berny Wiens - Rosetown-Elrose 1991-1995, Rosetown-Biggar 1995-1999 (Defeated, NDP Lost)
- Reg Knezacek - Saltcoats 1991-1995 (Defeated, NDP Lost)
- Eric Cline - Saskatoon Idylwyld 1991-1995, Saskatoon Mount Royal 1995-1999-2003, Saskatoon Massey Place 2003-2007 (Retired, NDP Won)
- Carol Teichrob - Saskatoon River Heights 1991-1995, Saskatoon Meewasin 1995-1999 (Retired, NDP Won)
- Janice MacKinnon - Saskatoon Westmount 1991-1995, Saskatoon Idylwyld 1995-1999-2001by (Retired, NDP Won)
- Pat Lorje - Saskatoon Wildwood 1991-1995, Saskatoon Southeast 1995-1999-2003 (Retired, NDP Lost)
- Glen McPherson - Shaunavon 1991-1995 (Switch to Liberals, NDP Lost Wood River)
- Jack Langford - Shellbrook-Torch River 1991-1995, Saskatchewan Rivers 1995-1999 (Defeated, NDP Lost)
- John Penner - Swift Current 1991-1995 (Retired, NDP Won)
- Ronald Wormsbecker - Weyburn 1991-1995 (Retired, NDP Won)
- Clay Serby - Yorkton - 1991-1995-1999-2003-2007 (Retired, NDP Lost)

February 4, 1994 By-Election -1

== 1995 general election ==
The NDP won 42 of the 58 seats available in the 1995 election, June 21, 1995.

- Sharon Murrell - Battleford-Cut Knife 1995-1999 (Defeated, NDP Lost)
- Larry Ward - Estevan 1995-1999 (Defeated, NDP Lost)
- John Nilson - Regina Lakeview 1995-1999-2003-2007–2011-2016 (Retired 2016, NDP won)
- Lindy Kasperski - Regina Sherwood 1995-1999-2003 (Switched to Independent, NDP Won)
- Andrew Thomson - Regina South 1995-1999-2003-2007 (Retired, NDP Lost)
- John Wall - Swift Current 1995-1999 (Defeated, NDP Lost)

November 19, 1996 By-Election -1 seat

== 1998 (June 24) by-election ==
- Switch

- Judy Junor - Saskatoon Eastview 1998by-1999-2003-2007–2011 (Defeated NDP Lost)

== 1998 (October 26) by-election ==
+1 (Liberal MLA switch to NDP, By-Election Held)

- Buckley Belanger Athabasca 1995 (Liberal, crossed floor to NDP in 1997 and ran in a byelection), 1998by-1999-2003-2007–2011–2016-2020 (resigned 2021 to run as a federal Liberal, defeated, NDP lost)

== 1999 (June 28) by-elections ==
- 2 Switches

- Kevin Yates - Regina Dewdney 1999by-1999-2003-2007–2011 (Defeated NDP Lost)
- Chris Axworthy - Saskatoon Fairview 1999by-1999-2003by (Retired, NDP Won)

== 1999 general election ==
Sept 16th, 1999 election. The NDP won 29 out of 58 seats, a decline of 14 seats. The NDP was able to remain in government with the support of the Liberals. Four new NDP MLAs were elected:

- Deb Higgins - Moose Jaw Wakamow - 1999-2003-2007–2011 (Defeated NDP Lost)
- Mark Wartman - Regina Qu'Appelle Valley 1999-2003-2007 (Defeated, NDP Lost)
- Carolyn Jones - Saskatoon Meewasin - 1999-2003 (Retired, NDP Won)
- Graham Addley - Saskatoon Sutherland 1999-2003-2007 (Defeated, NDP Lost)

== 2001 (February 26) by-election ==
- 1 Switch

- Warren McCall - Regina Elphinstone 2001by Regina Elphinstone-Centre 2003-2007–2011–2016-2020 (retired 2020, NDP hold)

== 2001 (March 19) by-election ==
- 1 Switch/Return of Lorne Calvert

== 2001 (November 8) by-election ==
- 1 Switch

- David Forbes - Saskatoon Idylwyld 2001by Saskatoon Centre 2003–2007-2011–2016-2020 (retired 2020, NDP hold)

== 2003 (March 17) by-elections ==
- Andy Iwanchuk - Saskatoon Fairview 2003by-2003-2007–2011 (Defeated, NDP Lost)

== 2003 floor crossing ==
In September 2003 Liberal turned Independent MLAs Jim Melenchuk and Ron Osika (Melville), both members of the cabinet for several years, formally joined the NDP. They were both defeated in the general election weeks later.

- Jim Melenchuk - Saskatoon Northwest - 1999 (Liberal) - 2003 (Defeated as NDP)
- Ron Osika - Melville - 1995 -1999 (Liberal) - 2003 (Defeated as NDP in new constituency of Melville-Saltcoats)

== 2003 general election ==
The NDP won 30 of the 58 seats available in the 2003 election, a gain of two seats. The NDP retained government under Lorne Calvert, who had succeeded Roy Romanow as NDP leader and premier in 2001. Five new NDP MLAs were elected:

- Len Taylor - former NDP MP - The Battlefords 2003-2007–2011 (Defeated NDP Lost)
- Joan Beatty - Cumberland 2003-2007-2008 (resigned to run federally for Liberals, NDP Won)
- Lon Borgerson - Saskatchewan Rivers 2003-2007 (Defeated, NDP Lost)
- Frank Quennell - Saskatoon Meewasin 2003-2007–2001 (Defeated NDP Lost)
- Sandra Morin - Regina Walsh Acres 2003-2007–2011 (Defeated NDP Lost)

== 2007 general election ==
The NDP won 20 of the 58 seats available in the 2007 election, a loss of ten seats from the previous election, meaning the defeat of the NDP government. Three new NDP MLAs were elected:

- Cam Broten - NDP leader (2013-2016), Saskatoon Massey Place 2007–2011-2016 (defeated 2016)
- Darcy Furber - Prince Albert Northcote 2007-2011 (defeated 2011, NDP Lost)
- Trent Wotherspoon NDP leader (2016-2017) - Regina Rosemont 2007–2011–2016-2020–present

== 2008 (June 25) by-election ==
The NDP won a byelection on June 25, 2008, following the resignation from the legislature of Joan Beatty:

- Doyle Vermette - Cumberland 2008by-2011–2016-2020–2024

== 2009 (September 21) by-election ==
- Danielle Chartier - Saskatoon Riversdale 2009by-2011–2016-2020

== 2011 general election ==
The NDP won 9 of the 58 seats available in the 2011 election. One new NDP MLA was elected:

- Cathy Sproule - Saskatoon Nutana 2011–2016-2020 (retired 2020, NDP hold)

== 2016 general election ==
The NDP won 10 of the 58 seats available in the 2016 election, a gain of 1 seat. Three new MLAs were elected:

- Nicole Rancourt - Prince Albert Northcote 2016-2020 (defeated 2020, NDP lost)
- Nicole Sarauer - Regina Douglas Park - 2016-2020–present
- Carla Beck NDP leader (2022–present) - Regina Lakeview - 2016-2020–present

== 2017/2018 by-elections ==
- Ryan Meili - NDP leader (2018-2022) - Saskatoon Meewasin - 2017by-2020-2022 (resigned 2022, by-election NDP won)
- Vicki Mowat - Saskatoon Fairview - 2017by-2020–present
- Yens Pedersen - Regina Northeast - 2018by-2020 (defeated 2020, NDP lost)

== 2020 general election ==
The NDP won 13 of the 58 seats available in the 2020 election. Six new NDP MLAs were elected:

- Betty Nippi-Albright - Saskatoon Centre - 2020–present
- Matt Love - Saskatoon Eastview - 2020–present
- Erika Ritchie - Saskatoon Nutana - 2020–present
- Jennifer Bowes - Saskatoon University - 2020–2024
- Meara Conway - Regina Elphinstone-Centre - 2020–present
- Aleana Young - Regina University - 2020–present

== 2022 by-election ==
One New Democrat was elected in a 2022 by-election.

- Nathaniel Teed - Saskatoon Meewasin 2022by-present

== 2023 by-elections ==
Two New Democrats was elected in the 2022 by-elections.

- Noor Burki - Regina Coronation Park 2023by-present
- Jared Clarke - Regina Walsh Acres 2023by-present

== 2024 general election ==
The NDP won 27 of the 61 seats available in the 2024 election. 15 new NDP MLAs were elected:

- Leroy Laliberte - Athabasca - 2024–present
- Jordan McPhail - Cumberland - 2024–present
- Keith Jorgenson - Saskatoon Churchill-Wildwood - 2024–present
- Hugh Gordon - Saskatoon Silverspring - 2024–present
- Brittney Senger - Saskatoon Southeast - 2024–present
- Darcy Warrington - Saskatoon University-Sutherland - 2024–present
- Tajinder Grewal - Saskatoon Stonebridge - 2024–present
- Don McBean - Saskatoon Chief Mistawasis - 2024–present
- Kim Breckner - Saskatoon Riversdale - 2024–present
- April ChiefCalf - Saskatoon Westview - 2024–present
- Jacqueline Roy - Regina Northeast - 2024–present
- Bhajan Brar - Regina Pasqua - 2024–present
- Joan Pratchler - Regina Rochdale - 2024–present
- Sally Housser - Regina University - 2024–present
- Brent Blakley - Regina Wascana Plains - 2024–present

== See also ==
- List of CCF/NDP members
- List of British Columbia CCF/NDP members
- List of Alberta CCF/NDP members
- List of Manitoba CCF/NDP members
- List of Ontario CCF/NDP members
- List of Nova Scotia CCF/NDP members
- List of Yukon NDP members
