= Ray Meiklejohn =

Canadian politician (born 1935)

The Honourable Ray Meiklejohn ECS

MLA for Saskatoon Mayfair
- In office 1986–1991
- Preceded by: Cal Glauser
- Succeeded by: Carol Teichrob

Personal details
- Born: November 7, 1935 (age 90) Quill Lake, Saskatchewan
- Party: PC
- Spouse: Carol Sue Butts
- Occupation: Retired

Raymond Harry Meiklejohn (/ˈmiːkəlˌdʒɒn/; born November 7, 1935) is a retired Canadian politician and educator.

== Early life ==
Meiklejohn was born on November 7, 1935, in Quill Lake, Saskatchewan, to Robert James Meiklejohn and Ada Maria Woodbury.

He received his primary and secondary education in Quill Lake. After graduating, Meiklejohn attended Saskatoon Teacher's College and the University of Saskatchewan, where he earned a Bachelor of Education degree in 1965 and a postgraduate diploma in 1975.

Prior to his entry into politics, Meiklejohn worked as a teacher and special education administrator in Saskatoon.

== Political career ==
Meiklejohn ran unsuccessfully in the Kelvington-Wadena district in the 1978 provincial general election. He was first elected to the Saskatchewan Legislature in 1986 and served as the Progressive Conservative member for the Saskatoon Mayfair constituency until 1991. Meiklejohn ran unsuccessfully in the 1984 federal election as a Progressive Conservative in the Humboldt—Lake Centre riding.

Meiklejohn served in the Grant Devine government as Minister of Science and Technology (1986–1990); Minister of Consumer and Commercial Affairs (1988–1989); and Minister of Education (1989–1991). Meiklejohn was Minister Responsible for Saskatchewan Research Council (1986–1989); Meewasin Valley Authority (1986–1991); Agricultural Implements Board (1988–1989); Future Corporation (1989); Saskatchewan Gaming Commission (1989); Teachers' Superannuation Commission (1989–1991); Saskatchewan Communications Advanced Network (1989–1990); Status of Women (1990–1991).

After losing his seat in the 1991 provincial general election to Carol Teichrob (NDP), Meiklejohn worked as a scholarship trust fund representative and pager salesman for Rogers Cantel in Saskatoon.

Meiklejohn is currently (2006) semi-retired and resides in Platteville, Wisconsin, where his wife, Carol Sue Butts, was Provost and Vice-Chancellor of the University of Wisconsin–Platteville.

== Family ==
Meiklejohn has three children with his first wife, Maidra Creswell: Laurel Rae, Elliott Craig and Catherine Elizabeth. He married Dr. Carol Sue Butts on October 6, 1990.
