= Jack Sandberg =

Canadian politician

John Sven "Jack" Sandberg (born 1938) is an educator and former political figure in Saskatchewan, Canada. He represented Saskatoon Centre from 1982 to 1986 in the Legislative Assembly of Saskatchewan as a Progressive Conservative.

He was born in Leslie, Saskatchewan, in 1938 and was educated at the Saskatchewan Teachers College. He worked as a teacher, broadcaster and media manager for Federated Co-op. Sandberg served in the provincial cabinet as Minister of Co-operatives and Co-operative Development and as Minister of Consumer and Corporate Affairs. He was defeated by Anne deBlois Smart when he ran for reelection to the provincial assembly in 1986. After leaving provincial politics, Sandberg worked for SaskPower, retiring in 1993. In 1993, he ran unsuccessfully for the Kindersley—Lloydminster seat in the Canadian House of Commons.
