= Leslie Lee =

Leslie Lee may refer to:

- Leslie Lee (New Zealand politician) (1814–1897), member of the New Zealand Legislative Council
- Leslie Walter Lee (1896–1998), American-born farmer and Canadian politician
- Leslie Lee (playwright) (1930–2014), American playwright, director and professor of playwriting and screenwriting
