= Saskatoon Centre =

Provincial electoral district in Saskatchewan, Canada

Saskatchewan electoral district

Provincial electoral district
- Legislature: Legislative Assembly of Saskatchewan
MLA
Betty Nippi-Albright
Independent
- District created: 1975
- First contested: 1975
- Last contested: 2020
- Communities: Saskatoon

Saskatoon Centre is a provincial electoral district for the Legislative Assembly of Saskatchewan, Canada. It is one of 13 districts covering the province's largest city, Saskatoon.

== Members of the Legislative Assembly ==
Legislature	Years	Member	Party
Saskatoon City Park-University
16th	1967-1971	Joseph Jeffrey Charlebois	Liberal
Saskatoon City Park
17th	1971-1975	Beverly Milton Dyck	New Democrat
Saskatoon Centre
18th	1975–1978	Paul Mostoway	New Democrat
19th	1978–1982	Paul Mostoway	New Democrat
20th	1982–1986	Jack Sandberg	Progressive Conservative
21st	1986–1991	Anne Smart	New Democrat
Saskatoon Idylwyld
22nd	1991–1995	Eric Cline	New Democrat
23rd	1995–1999	Janice MacKinnon	New Democrat
24th	1999–2001	Janice MacKinnon	New Democrat
24th	2001–2003	David Forbes	New Democrat
Saskatoon Centre
25th	2003–2007	David Forbes	New Democrat
26th	2007–2011	David Forbes	New Democrat
27th	2011–2016	David Forbes	New Democrat
28th	2016–2020	David Forbes	New Democrat
29th	2020–2024	Betty Nippi-Albright	New Democrat
30th	2024–2026	Betty Nippi-Albright	New Democrat
30th	2026-present	Betty Nippi-Albright	Independent

== Electoral history ==
2020 Saskatchewan general election
Party	Candidate	Votes	%	±%
New Democratic	Betty Nippi-Albright	3,080	58.52	+1.44
Saskatchewan	Kim Groff	2,031	38.59	+1.97
Green	Raven Reid	152	2.89	+0.44
Total valid votes		5,263	98.60	
Total rejected ballots		75	1.40	+1.00
Turnout		5,338	39.56	-3.57
Eligible voters		13,492		
New Democratic hold		Swing		–
Source: Elections Saskatchewan

2016 Saskatchewan general election
Party	Candidate	Votes	%	±%
New Democratic	David Forbes	3,005	57.08	+3.18
Saskatchewan	Brad Hoffmann	1,928	36.62	-6.40
Liberal	Roman M. Todos	203	3.86	-
Green	Kathryn McDonald	129	2.45	-0.63
Total valid votes		5,265	99.60	
Total rejected ballots		21	0.40	–
Turnout		5,286	43.13	–
Eligible voters		12,256		
New Democratic hold		Swing		–
Source: Elections Saskatchewan

2011 Saskatchewan general election
Party	Candidate	Votes	%	±%
New Democratic	David Forbes	2,790	54.00	-3.36
Saskatchewan	David Cooper	2,218	42.93	+13.08
Green	Daeran Gall	159	3.08	+0.76
Total		5,167	100	
New Democratic hold		Swing		–

2007 Saskatchewan general election
Party	Candidate	Votes	%	±%
New Democratic	David Forbes	3,707	57.36	-4.49
Saskatchewan	Jonathan Abrametz	1,929	29.85	+9.13
Liberal	Derek Morrison	565	8.74	-6.81
Green	Nathan Risling	150	2.32	–
Marijuana	Nathan Holowaty	112	1.73	–
Total		6,463	100	
New Democratic hold		Swing		–

2003 Saskatchewan general election
Party	Candidate	Votes	%	±%
New Democratic	David Forbes	3,607	61.85	–
Saskatchewan	Roger Parent	1,165	19.98	–
Liberal	Richard Clatney	907	15.55	–
Progressive Conservative	Betty Konkin	153	2.62	–
Total		5,831	100	

== See also ==
- List of Saskatchewan provincial electoral districts
- List of Saskatchewan general elections
- Canadian provincial electoral districts
