= Frederick Middleton Dundas =

Canadian politician

Frederick Middleton Dundas (March 26, 1885 – 1956) was a political figure in Saskatchewan. He represented Qu'Appelle-Wolseley from 1934 to 1944 and from 1948 to 1952 in the Legislative Assembly of Saskatchewan as a Liberal.

He was born in Qu'Appelle, Saskatchewan, the son of Andrew Dundas and Janet Mitchell, both natives of Scotland. In 1911, he married Henrietta Henson. Dundas served as mayor of Sintaluta, Saskatchewan. He was defeated by Warden Burgess when he ran for reelection to the provincial assembly in 1944 but defeated Burgess in 1948.
