= Bill Berezowsky =

Canadian politician

Member of the Saskatchewan Legislative Assembly for Prince Albert East-Cumberland
- In office 1952–1971
- Preceded by: Lorne Earl Blanchard
- Succeeded by: Norman MacAuley

Personal details
- Born: William John Berezowsky; January 6, 1904 Austria-Hungary
- Died: January 17, 1974 (aged 70)
- Party: Saskatchewan New Democratic Party
- Occupation: Farmer

William John Berezowsky (January 6, 1904 – January 17, 1974) was a Canadian businessman, farmer, civil servant and political figure in Saskatchewan, born in the Austro-Hungarian Empire. He represented Cumberland from 1952 until 1967, then Prince Albert East-Cumberland from 1967 until 1971, in the Legislative Assembly of Saskatchewan as a Co-operative Commonwealth Federation (CCF) and then New Democratic Party (NDP) member.

He came to western Canada with his family in 1908 and was educated in Winnipeg, Prince Albert, and Saskatoon. Before his political service, Berezowsky worked for the railway, taught school, worked on the family farm, and as a prospector. He served in the Royal Canadian Air Force during World War II. Berezowsky was staff training superintendent for the Saskatchewan Department of Natural Resources from 1948 to 1952. He also served as secretary-treasurer for the rural municipality of Garden River No. 490, Saskatchewan from 1927 to 1943 and as president and secretary for the Meath Park Board of Trade. He was not a candidate in the 1971 Saskatchewan general election. He ran for the federal New Democratic Party in the 1972 Canadian federal election, losing to Progressive Conservative incumbent and former prime minister John Diefenbaker in the Prince Albert riding.

Berezowsky died in 1974, at the age of 70. The W.J. Berezowsky School was named in his honour.

1972 Canadian federal election: Prince Albert
Party	Candidate	Votes	%	±%
Progressive Conservative	John Diefenbaker	19,410	59.5	+3.5
New Democratic	Bill Berezowsky	9,115	27.9	-0.2
Liberal	Leo F. Pinel	3,613	11.1	-4.7
Social Credit	Claude Campagna	421	1.3	
Independent	Bill Fair	61	0.2	
Total valid votes		32,620	100.0	
