= Prince Albert East =

Prince Albert East was a constituency of the Legislative Assembly of Saskatchewan. It was created out of Prince Albert East-Cumberland and was represented by Mike Feschuk from 1971 to 1975.
