= Qu'Appelle-Wolseley =

Former provincial electoral district in Saskatchewan, Canada

Coordinates: 50°27′N 103°40′W

Qu'Appelle-Wolseley is a former provincial electoral district for the Legislative Assembly of the province of Saskatchewan, Canada. This district was created before the 8th Saskatchewan general election in 1934 by combining the constituencies of South Qu'Appelle and Wolseley. Redrawn and renamed "Indian Head-Wolseley" in 1975, the riding was dissolved before the 23rd Saskatchewan general election in 1995.

It is now part of the Indian Head-Milestone and Regina Wascana Plains constituencies.

== Members of the Legislative Assembly ==
=== Qu'Appelle-Wolseley (1934–1975) ===
| # | MLA | Served | Party |
|---|---|---|---|
| 1. | Frederick Dundas | 1934–1944 | Liberal |
| 2. | Warden Burgess | 1944–1948 | CCF |
| 3. | Frederick Dundas | 1948–1952 | Liberal |
| 4. | William Wahl | 1952–1956 | CCF |
| 5. | Douglas McFarlane | 1956–1971 | Liberal |
| 6. | Terry Hanson | 1971–1975 | New Democrat |

=== Indian Head-Wolseley (1975–1995) ===
| # | MLA | Served | Party |
|---|---|---|---|
| 1. | Cyril MacDonald | 1975–1978 | Liberal |
| 2. | Doug Taylor | 1978–1991 | Progressive Conservative |
| 3. | Lorne Scott | 1991–1995 | New Democrat |

== Election results ==
1934 Saskatchewan general election: Qu'Appelle-Wolseley
| Party | Candidate | Votes | % | ±% |
|---|---|---|---|---|
| Liberal | Frederick Dundas | 4,130 | 47.53% | – |
| Conservative | Stanley Withington Nichols | 2,627 | 30.23% | – |
| Farmer-Labour | John Henry Sturdy | 1,932 | 22.24% | – |
| Total | | 8,689 | 100.00% | |

1938 Saskatchewan general election: Qu'Appelle-Wolseley
| Party | Candidate | Votes | % | ±% |
|---|---|---|---|---|
| Liberal | Frederick Dundas | 4,871 | 50.63% | +3.10 |
| Conservative | Stanley Withington Nichols | 3,253 | 33.82% | +3.59 |
| Social Credit | Joseph A. Thauberger | 1,496 | 15.55% | – |
| Total | | 9,620 | 100.00% | |

1944 Saskatchewan general election: Qu'Appelle-Wolseley
| Party | Candidate | Votes | % | ±% |
|---|---|---|---|---|
| CCF | Warden Burgess | 4,339 | 50.51% | – |
| Liberal | Frederick Dundas | 3,314 | 38.57% | −12.06 |
| Prog. Conservative | William H. Acres | 938 | 10.92% | −22.90 |
| Total | | 8,591 | 100.00% | |

1948 Saskatchewan general election: Qu'Appelle-Wolseley
| Party | Candidate | Votes | % | ±% |
|---|---|---|---|---|
| Liberal | Frederick Dundas | 4,470 | 46.44% | +7.87 |
| CCF | Warden Burgess | 3,903 | 40.54% | −9.97 |
| Social Credit | E.F. Josephson | 1,253 | 13.02% | – |
| Total | | 9,626 | 100.00% | |

1952 Saskatchewan general election: Qu'Appelle-Wolseley
| Party | Candidate | Votes | % | ±% |
|---|---|---|---|---|
| CCF | William Wahl | 4,076 | 43.71% | +3.17 |
| Liberal | Douglas McFarlane | 3,705 | 39.74% | −6.70 |
| Social Credit | Frank A. Mildenberger | 745 | 7.99% | −5.03 |
| Prog. Conservative | John H. Frasz | 695 | 7.45% | – |
| Independent Liberal | Jim Mildenberger | 103 | 1.11% | – |
| Total | | 9,324 | 100.00% | |

1956 Saskatchewan general election: Qu'Appelle-Wolseley
| Party | Candidate | Votes | % | ±% |
|---|---|---|---|---|
| Liberal | Douglas McFarlane | 3,228 | 35.03% | −4.71 |
| CCF | William Wahl | 3,084 | 33.47% | −10.24 |
| Social Credit | Frank A. Mildenberger | 2,058 | 22.34% | +14.35 |
| Prog. Conservative | Clifford J. Hunt | 844 | 9.16% | +1.71 |
| Total | | 9,214 | 100.00% | |

1960 Saskatchewan general election: Qu'Appelle-Wolseley
| Party | Candidate | Votes | % | ±% |
|---|---|---|---|---|
| Liberal | Douglas McFarlane | 3,437 | 42.06% | +7.03 |
| CCF | William Wahl | 2,527 | 30.92% | −2.55 |
| Prog. Conservative | C. Frederick Hood | 1,204 | 14.73% | +5.57 |
| Social Credit | Robert W. Farthing | 1,004 | 12.29% | −10.05 |
| Total | | 8,172 | 100.00% | |

1964 Saskatchewan general election: Qu'Appelle-Wolseley
| Party | Candidate | Votes | % | ±% |
|---|---|---|---|---|
| Liberal | Douglas McFarlane | 3,525 | 44.75% | +2.69 |
| CCF | John S. Leier | 2,188 | 27.78% | −3.14 |
| Prog. Conservative | Victor E. Horsman | 2,164 | 27.47% | +12.74 |
| Total | | 7,877 | 100.00% | |

1967 Saskatchewan general election: Qu'Appelle-Wolseley
| Party | Candidate | Votes | % | ±% |
|---|---|---|---|---|
| Liberal | Douglas McFarlane | 2,990 | 45.60% | +0.85 |
| NDP | John S. Leier | 1,842 | 28.10% | +0.32 |
| Prog. Conservative | Victor E. Horsman | 1,401 | 21.37% | −6.10 |
| Social Credit | Lloyd Avram | 323 | 4.93% | – |
| Total | | 6,556 | 100.00% | |

1971 Saskatchewan general election: Qu'Appelle-Wolseley
| Party | Candidate | Votes | % | ±% |
|---|---|---|---|---|
| NDP | Terry Hanson | 3,154 | 44.99% | +16.89 |
| Liberal | Douglas McFarlane | 2,766 | 39.46% | −6.14 |
| Prog. Conservative | Lloyd Avram | 1,090 | 15.55% | −5.82 |
| Total | | 7,010 | 100.00% | |

=== Indian Head-Wolseley ===
1975 Saskatchewan general election: Indian Head-Wolseley
| Party | Candidate | Votes | % | ±% |
|---|---|---|---|---|
| Liberal | Cyril MacDonald | 2,844 | 39.01% | −0.45 |
| NDP | Terry Hanson | 2,241 | 30.74% | −14.25 |
| Prog. Conservative | Jack H. Horsman | 2,205 | 30.25% | +14.70 |
| Total | | 7,290 | 100.00% | |

1978 Saskatchewan general election: Indian Head-Wolseley
| Party | Candidate | Votes | % | ±% |
|---|---|---|---|---|
| Progressive Conservative | Doug Taylor | 2,893 | 39.98% | +9.73 |
| NDP | Pat Connelly | 2,400 | 33.17% | +2.43 |
| Liberal | Cyril MacDonald | 1,943 | 26.85% | −12.16 |
| Total | | 7,236 | 100.00% | |

1982 Saskatchewan general election: Indian Head-Wolseley
| Party | Candidate | Votes | % | ±% |
|---|---|---|---|---|
| Progressive Conservative | Doug Taylor | 4,251 | 57.07% | +17.09 |
| NDP | Pat Connelly | 2,073 | 27.83% | −5.34 |
| Liberal | Con Lalonde | 571 | 7.66% | −19.19 |
| Western Canada Concept | John Parley | 554 | 7.44% | – |
| Total | | 7,449 | 100.00% | |

1986 Saskatchewan general election: Indian Head-Wolseley
| Party | Candidate | Votes | % | ±% |
|---|---|---|---|---|
| Progressive Conservative | Doug Taylor | 3,976 | 57.82% | +0.80 |
| NDP | Joe Zaba | 1,794 | 26.09% | −1.74 |
| Liberal | Donald E. Gabel | 1,106 | 16.09% | +8.43 |
| Total | | 6,876 | 100.00% | |

1991 Saskatchewan general election: Indian Head-Wolseley
| Party | Candidate | Votes | % | ±% |
|---|---|---|---|---|
| NDP | Lorne Scott | 2,725 | 39.72% | +13.63 |
| Liberal | Jack Hosler | 2,069 | 30.16% | +14.07 |
| Prog. Conservative | Dwight Dunn | 2,066 | 30.12% | −27.70 |
| Total | | 6,860 | 100.00% | |

== See also ==
- List of Saskatchewan provincial electoral districts
- List of Saskatchewan general elections
- Canadian provincial electoral districts
- Qu'Appelle, Saskatchewan
- Wolseley, Saskatchewan
