= Prince Albert East-Cumberland =

Former provincial electoral district in Saskatchewan, Canada

Prince Albert East-Cumberland was a constituency of the Legislative Assembly of Saskatchewan.

== History ==
The seat was created out of the Cumberland district and later became Prince Albert East.

== Geography ==
The district covered the eastern part of Prince Albert.

== Representation ==
- Bill Berezowsky (1967 to 1971)

== See also ==
- List of Saskatchewan provincial electoral districts
- List of Saskatchewan general elections
- Canadian provincial electoral districts
