= Saskatoon Meewasin =

Provincial electoral district in Saskatchewan, Canada

Saskatchewan electoral district
- Coordinates: 52.147°N 106.653°W

Provincial electoral district
- Legislature: Legislative Assembly of Saskatchewan
MLA
Nathaniel Teed
New Democratic
- District created: 1967 as "Saskatoon Mayfair"
- First contested: 1967
- Last contested: 2024

Demographics
- Population (2021): 15,494
- Electors: 12,121
- Census division(s): Division No. 11
- Communities: Saskatoon

Saskatoon Meewasin is a provincial electoral district for the Legislative Assembly of Saskatchewan, Canada. The district includes the neighbourhoods of River Heights, Richmond Heights, City Park, North Park, and Kelsey-Woodlawn. As of the Canada 2016 Census, the population of the riding was 15,135.

Created for the 16th Saskatchewan general election as "Saskatoon Mayfair" out of part of Saskatoon City, this constituency was redrawn and renamed "Saskatoon River Heights" in 1991.

Ryan Meili resigned in 2022, and a provincial by-election was triggered.

== Members of the Legislative Assembly ==
Legislature	Years	Member	Party
Saskatoon Mayfair
16th	1967–1971	John Edward Brockelbank	New Democrat
17th	1971–1975	John Edward Brockelbank	New Democrat
18th	1975–1978	Beverly Dyck	New Democrat
19th	1978–1982	Beverly Dyck	New Democrat
20th	1982–1986	Cal Glauser	Progressive Conservative
21st	1986–1991	Ray Meiklejohn	Progressive Conservative
Saskatoon River Heights
22nd	1991–1995	Carol Teichrob	New Democrat
Saskatoon Meewasin
23rd	1995–1999	Carol Teichrob	New Democrat
24th	1999–2003	Carolyn Jones	New Democrat
25th	2003–2007	Frank Quennell	New Democrat
26th	2007–2011	Frank Quennell	New Democrat
27th	2011–2016	Roger Parent	Saskatchewan Party
28th	2016	Roger Parent	Saskatchewan Party
28th	2017–2020	Ryan Meili	New Democrat
29th	2020–2022	Ryan Meili	New Democrat
29th	2022-2024	Nathaniel Teed	New Democrat
30th	2024-	Nathaniel Teed	New Democrat

== Election results ==
=== 2022 by-election ===
Saskatchewan provincial by-election, September 26, 2022 Resignation of Ryan Meili
Party	Candidate	Votes	%	±%
New Democratic	Nathaniel Teed	2,813	57.9	+6.15
Saskatchewan	Kim Groff	1,730	36.6	-9.85
Liberal	Jeff Walters	135	2.61	
Buffalo	Mark Friesen	112	2.36	
Green	Jacklin Andrews	58	1.18	-1.42
Total valid votes		4,860	99.85	
Total rejected ballots		12	0.2	-1.04
Turnout		4,860	39.4	-18.79
Eligible voters		12,373		
New Democratic hold		Swing		+7.32

=== 2020 ===
2020 Saskatchewan general election
Party	Candidate	Votes	%	±%
New Democratic	Ryan Meili	3,700	51.24	-2.93
Saskatchewan	Rylund Hunter	3,333	46.16	+6.29
Green	Jacklin Andrews	188	2.60	+1.55
Total valid votes		7,221	98.85	
Total rejected ballots		84	1.15	–
Turnout		7,305	56.30	+14.75
Eligible voters		12,975		
New Democratic hold		Swing		-4.61
Source: Elections Saskatchewan

=== 2017 by-election ===
Saskatchewan provincial by-election, March 2, 2017 Death of Roger Parent
Party	Candidate	Votes	%	±%
New Democratic	Ryan Meili	2,723	54.17	+11.22
Saskatchewan	Brent Penner	2,004	39.86	-10.63
Liberal	Darrin Lamoureux	183	3.64	-0.79
Progressive Conservative	David Prokopchuk	64	1.27	-
Green	Shawn Setyo	53	1.05	-1.08
Total valid votes		5,027	99.82	
Total rejected ballots		9	0.18	-0.15
Turnout		5,036	41.55	-16.05
Eligible voters		12,121		
New Democratic gain from Saskatchewan		Swing		+10.92

=== 1995–2016 ===
2016 Saskatchewan general election
Party	Candidate	Votes	%	±%
Saskatchewan	Roger Parent	3,500	50.49	-3.56
New Democratic	Nicole White	2,977	42.95	+1.21
Liberal	Constance Sacher	307	4.43	+2.45
Green	Darren Gall	148	2.14	-0.11
Total valid votes		6,932	99.67	
Total rejected ballots		23	0.33	+0.08
Turnout		6,955	57.60	-10.74
Eligible voters		12,075		
Saskatchewan hold		Swing		-2.39
Source: Elections Saskatchewan

2011 Saskatchewan general election
Party	Candidate	Votes	%	±%
Saskatchewan	Roger Parent	3,853	54.05	+22.20
New Democratic	Frank Quennell	2,975	41.73	+6.41
Green	Tobi-Dawne Smith	160	2.24	+0.51
Liberal	Nathan Jeffries	141	1.98	-28.14
Total valid votes		7,129	99.75	
Total rejected ballots		18	0.25	-0.00
Turnout		7,147	68.34	-16.02
Eligible voters		10,458		
Saskatchewan gain from New Democratic		Swing		+7.90
Source: Elections Saskatchewan

2007 Saskatchewan general election
Party	Candidate	Votes	%	±%
New Democratic	Frank Quennell	3,039	35.32	-5.56
Saskatchewan	Roger Parent	2,740	31.85	+6.87
Liberal	David Karwacki	2,591	30.11	-3.06
Green	Don Cameron	149	1.73	+0.76
Marijuana	Matt Oscienny	85	0.99	*
Total valid votes		8,604	99.74	
Total rejected ballots		22	0.26	+0.14
Turnout		8,626	84.36	+7.97
Eligible voters		10,225		
New Democratic hold		Swing		-6.22
Source: Elections Saskatchewan

2003 Saskatchewan general election
Party	Candidate	Votes	%	±%
New Democratic	Frank Quennell	3,256	40.88	-3.31
Liberal	David Karwacki	2,642	33.17	+16.25
Saskatchewan	Shelley Hengen	1,989	24.97	-10.29
New Green	David Greenfield	77	0.97	-2.65
Total valid votes		7,964	99.89	
Total rejected ballots		9	0.11	-0.51
Turnout		7,964	76.31	+16.17
Eligible voters		10,437		
New Democratic hold		Swing		-9.78
Source: Elections Saskatchewan

1999 Saskatchewan general election
Party	Candidate	Votes	%	±%
New Democratic	Carolyn Jones	3,588	44.19	-7.08
Saskatchewan	Rodger Broadhead	2,863	35.26	+22.54
Liberal	Paul Prisciak	1,374	16.92	-19.08
New Green	David Greenfield	294	3.62	*
Total valid votes		8,119	99.38	
Total rejected ballots		51	0.62	+0.01
Turnout		8,170	60.13	+0.58
Eligible voters		13,587		
New Democratic hold		Swing		-14.81
Source: Elections Saskatchewan

^ Saskatchewan Party compared to Progressive Conservative

1995 Saskatchewan general election
Party	Candidate	Votes	%
New Democratic	Carol Teichrob	3,576	51.28
Liberal	Betty Anne Latrace-Henderson	2,511	36.01
Progressive Conservative	Rhys Frostad	887	12.72
Total valid votes		6,974	99.39
Total rejected ballots		43	0.61
Turnout		7,017	59.55
Eligible voters		11,783	
Source: Elections Saskatchewan

=== Saskatoon River Heights (1991–1995) ===
1991 Saskatchewan general election: Saskatoon River Heights
Party	Candidate	Votes	%	±%
NDP	Carol Teichrob	4,908	42.90	-0.90
Prog. Conservative	Ray Meiklejohn	3,578	31.27	-14.26
Liberal	Ed Monuik	2,955	25.83	+15.53
Total		11,441	100.00	

=== Saskatoon Mayfair (1967–1991) ===
1986 Saskatchewan general election: Saskatoon Mayfair
Party	Candidate	Votes	%	±%
Progressive Conservative	Ray Meiklejohn	7,725	45.53	-17.11
NDP	Gord Gunoff	7,431	43.80	+11.76
Liberal	Denis I. Quon	1,748	10.30	+6.56
Independent	Robert Bonsor	62	0.37	*
Total		16,966	100.00	

1982 Saskatchewan general election: Saskatoon Mayfair
Party	Candidate	Votes	%	±%
Progressive Conservative	Cal Glauser	7,386	62.64	+32.05
NDP	Dave Whalley	3,777	32.04	-23.26
Liberal	Maureen Darling	441	3.74	-10.37
Western Canada Concept	Don W. Kavanaugh	186	1.58	*
Total		11,790	100.00	

1978 Saskatchewan general election: Saskatoon Mayfair
Party	Candidate	Votes	%	±%
NDP	Beverly Dyck	4,328	55.30	+9.61
Prog. Conservative	Donna L. Birkmaier	2,394	30.59	+4.22
Liberal	Dick Reed	1,104	14.11	-13.83
Total		7,826	100.00	

1975 Saskatchewan general election: Saskatoon Mayfair
Party	Candidate	Votes	%	±%
NDP	Beverly Dyck	3,467	45.69	-22.02
Liberal	John Olsen	2,120	27.94	+2.39
Prog. Conservative	June Smith	2,001	26.37	+19.63
Total		7,588	100.00	

1971 Saskatchewan general election: Saskatoon Mayfair
Party	Candidate	Votes	%	±%
NDP	John Edward Brockelbank	8,545	67.71	+14.31
Liberal	Victor C. Hession	3,224	25.55	-7.72
Prog. Conservative	Lillian Sonmor	851	6.74	-6.59
Total		12,620	100.00	

1967 Saskatchewan general election: Saskatoon Mayfair
Party	Candidate	Votes	%	±%
NDP	John Edward Brockelbank	5,739	53.40	*
Liberal	Alex W. Prociuk	3,576	33.27	*
Prog. Conservative	Hugh Raney	1,432	13.33	*
Total		10,747	100.00	

== See also ==
- List of Saskatchewan provincial electoral districts
- List of Saskatchewan general elections
- Canadian provincial electoral districts
