= David Chan (politician) =

Canadian politician

David Chan MLA

Member of the Saskatchewan Legislative Assembly for Yorkton
- Incumbent
- Assumed office October 28, 2024
- Preceded by: Greg Ottenbreit

Personal details
- Party: Saskatchewan Party
- Education: Thompson Rivers University; Royal Roads University

David Chan is a Canadian politician who was elected to the Legislative Assembly of Saskatchewan in the 2024 general election, representing Yorkton as a member of the Saskatchewan Party.

Following an announcement on May 29, 2023 that Greg Ottenbreit would not seek re-election, Chan won a contested nomination to become the Saskatchewan Party's candidate in Yorkton, over two other contenders on March 7, 2024.

Prior to his political career, Chan worked as a mental health councillor for several area Indigenous communities. He holds degrees from Thompson Rivers University and Royal Roads University. He also worked for both institutions, as a projected manager for Thompson Rivers University in Chile and the Middle East and as a faculty member at Royal Roads University. In a volunteer capacity, he has coached senior boys' basketball, labored as a residential care worker, tutored Indigenous youth, and instructed English.

David is also the first Chinese-Canadian to be elected to the Saskatchewan Legislature.

== Electoral record ==
2024 Saskatchewan general election: Yorkton
Party	Candidate	Votes	%	±%
Saskatchewan	David Chan	3,513	51.79	-22.61
New Democratic	Lenore Pinder	2,274	33.52	+10.92
Saskatchewan United	Doug Forster	818	12.06	–
Green	Valerie Brooks	136	2.01	-0.89
Buffalo	Timothy Kasprick	42	0.62	–
Total valid votes		6,783	99.41	
Total rejected ballots		40	0.59	–
Turnout		6,823	52.74	–
Eligible voters		12,937		
Saskatchewan hold		Swing		–
Source: Elections Saskatchewan
