= Harry Wahl (politician) =

Canadian politician

William Henry "Harry" Wahl (14 December 1902 – 1 April 1975) was a Canadian farm implement dealer and political figure in Saskatchewan. He represented Qu'Appelle-Wolseley from 1952 to 1956 in the Legislative Assembly of Saskatchewan as a Co-operative Commonwealth Federation (CCF) member.

He was born in Carnduff, Saskatchewan, the son of Jacob Wahl and Isabell Newcomb, both of United Empire Loyalist descent. In 1936, he married Ruth McDonald. Wahl lived in Glenavon, Saskatchewan where he served as mayor, as a member of the local school board and as a member of the Saskatchewan Wheat Pool. Wahl was defeated by Douglas Thomas McFarlane when he ran for reelection to the provincial assembly in 1956 and again in 1960.
