= Lawrence Riel Yew =

Canadian politician

Member of the Legislative Assembly of Saskatchewan
- In office 1982–1986
- Preceded by: Norman MacAuley
- Succeeded by: Keith Goulet
- Constituency: Cumberland

Personal details
- Born: January 17, 1942 Beauval, Saskatchewan, Canada
- Died: April 18, 1998 (aged 56) Edmonton, Alberta, Canada
- Party: Saskatchewan New Democratic Party
- Spouse: Victoria Elizabeth Iron
- Occupation: trapper, fisherman

Lawrence Riel Yew (January 17, 1942 – April 18, 1998) was a trapper, fisherman and political figure in Saskatchewan. He represented Cumberland from 1982 to 1986 in the Legislative Assembly of Saskatchewan as a New Democratic Party (NDP) member. Yew was the first aboriginal MLA elected in Saskatchewan.

He was born in Beauval, Saskatchewan. He served as administrator for Pinehouse. Yew was executive assistant to the minister of the Department of Northern Saskatchewan. He served as a municipal councillor in northern Saskatchewan before entering provincial politics. In 1964, he married Victoria Elizabeth Iron. He died at the age of 56 in 1998.
