= Greg Ottenbreit =

Canadian politician

The Honourable Greg Ottenbreit ECS
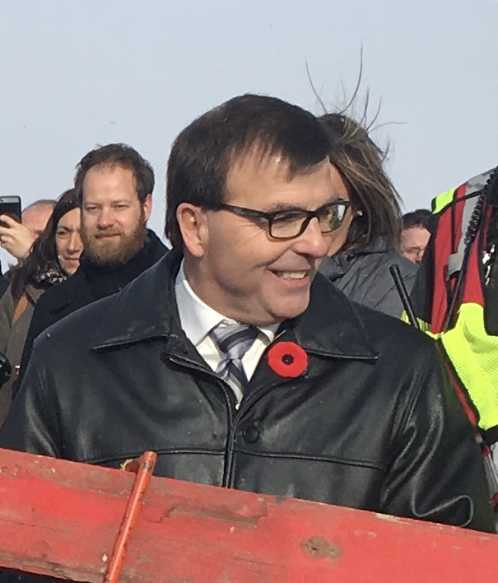
- Ottenbreit in 2019.

Member of the Saskatchewan Legislative Assembly for Yorkton
- In office November 7, 2007 – October 1, 2024
- Preceded by: Clay Serby
- Succeeded by: David Chan

Personal details
- Born: November 18, 1963 (age 62) Regina, Saskatchewan, Canada
- Party: Saskatchewan Party

Greg Ottenbreit (born November 18, 1963) is a Canadian politician who represented the electoral district of Yorkton in the Legislative Assembly of Saskatchewan from 2007 to 2024. He is a member of the Saskatchewan Party. He was a cabinet minister under premiers Brad Wall and Scott Moe between 2014 and 2020.

== Political career ==
Ottenbreit was first elected MLA for Yorkton in the 2007 election, when the Saskatchewan Party won government under the leadership of Brad Wall. Before Ottenbreit's win, the Yorkton seat had been held by the New Democratic Party since 1991. Ottenbreit was re-elected in Yorkton three times in 2011, 2016, and 2020.

Ottenbreit was first named to Wall's cabinet in 2014 when he became the Minister of Rural and Remote Health. Prior to the appointment, he had served as government whip. Ottenbreit remained in the role when Scott Moe succeeded Wall as Premier in 2018. By 2019, Ottenbreit was questioned by the Opposition as to whether his anti-abortion views were preventing the government from approving universal coverage for medical abortion drugs, with most provinces having adopted coverage. That summer, Ottenbreit was shuffled from rural and remote health to become the new Minister of Highways and Infrastructure; Moe, who stated that he shared Ottenbreit's anti-abortion position, said that the controversy was not the reason for the shuffle. After the 2020 election, Ottenbreit was dropped from cabinet.

On May 29, 2023, Ottenbreit announced that he would not seek re-election in the 2024 election, but would remain in office for the remainder of his term. In October 2024, he was succeeded as Yorkton MLA by David Chan.

== Controversies ==
In 2011, Ottenbreit argued against resource revenue-sharing with First Nations in the province, suggesting that First Nations people who get "handouts" spend the money on drugs and alcohol; Ottenbreit apologized for the comments. The comments drew calls for Ottenbreit's resignation from the Federation of Saskatchewan Indian Nations.

In a 2019 speech, Ottenbreit urged an anti-abortion group to continue their "battle" and stated that he would "continue to do what I can in my professional capacity" to help; at the time, Ottenbreit was the minister in charge of rural and remote health. Premier Scott Moe stated that the comments crossed a "small line" and said that government ministers "will choose our words more carefully." Ottenbreit had previously attended anti-abortion March for Life rallies in Ottawa and Regina.

During the emergence of the COVID-19 pandemic in Saskatchewan in March 2020, Ottenbreit was criticized for sharing a social media post suggesting that people 'pray and repent' to stop the pandemic. Ottenbreit added a comment saying, "I guess it worked a few thousand years ago ... couldn't hurt." He later deleted the post.

In October 2020, Ottenbreit shared a Thanksgiving message from Texas Pastor Ed Newton, an American preacher who has shared anti-LGBT views and whose church labels homosexuality as an addiction. Ottenbreit had earlier shared messages from pastor John Hagee, a social conservative who had referred to the Roman Catholic Church as "the great whore" and claimed Adolf Hitler was fulfilling God's will. Ottenbreit said he found Hagee's documentary about "Blood Moons", which claims that lunar eclipses coinciding with Jewish holidays will trigger a war in Israel and usher in the return of Jesus Christ, to be "very interesting".

== Personal life ==
Before being elected to the Legislature, Ottenbreit owned and operated Ottenbreit Waste Systems along with his brother.

On January 27, 2017, it was revealed that Ottenbreit had been diagnosed with cancer. Ottenbreit had in 2000 lost a son to cancer; after their son's death, Ottenbreit and his family hosted an ongoing childhood cancer research fundraiser in Yorkton.

== Electoral results ==
2020 Saskatchewan general election: Yorkton
Party	Candidate	Votes	%
Saskatchewan	Greg Ottenbreit	4,171	74.01
New Democratic	Carter Antoine	1,301	23.08
Green	Judy Mergel	164	2.91
Total		5,636	100.0
Source: Elections Saskatchewan

2016 Saskatchewan general election: Yorkton
Party	Candidate	Votes	%
Saskatchewan	Greg Ottenbreit	4,585	72.56
New Democratic	Greg Olson	1,432	22.66
Liberal	Aaron Sinclair	184	2.91
Green	Chad Gregoire	118	1.87
Total		6,319	100.0
Source: Saskatchewan Archives - Election Results by Electoral Division; Elections Saskatchewan

2011 Saskatchewan general election: Yorkton
Party	Candidate	Votes	%
Saskatchewan	Greg Ottenbreit	5,446	72.45
New Democratic	Chad Blenkin	1,932	25.70
Green	Kathryn McDonald	139	1.85
Total		7,517	100.0
Source: Saskatchewan Archives - Election Results by Electoral Division

2007 Saskatchewan general election: Yorkton
Party	Candidate	Votes	%
Saskatchewan	Greg Ottenbreit	5,005	59.46
New Democratic	Randy Goulden	3,158	37.52
Liberal	Joyce Landry	254	3.02
Total		8,417	100.0
Source: Saskatchewan Archives - Election Results by Electoral Division

== Cabinet positions ==
Saskatchewan provincial government of Scott Moe
Cabinet posts (2)
Predecessor	Office	Successor
Lori Carr	Minister of Highways; August 13, 2019 – November 9, 2020	Joe Hargrave
cont'd from Wall Ministry	Minister of Rural and Remote Health; February 2, 2018 – August 13, 2019	Warren Kaeding
Saskatchewan provincial government of Brad Wall
Cabinet post (1)
Predecessor	Office	Successor
Tim McMillan	Minister of Rural and Remote Health; September 18, 2014 – February 2, 2018	cont'd into Moe Ministry
