= Randall Neil Nelson =

Canadian politician (1926–2023)

Randall Neil Nelson (June 6, 1926 – July 30, 2023) was a Canadian educator and politician in Saskatchewan. He represented Yorkton from 1975 to 1982 in the Legislative Assembly of Saskatchewan as a New Democratic Party (NDP) member.

Nelson was born in Rosetown, Saskatchewan, the son of Louis Nelson, and studied at the University of Saskatchewan, where he received a BEd degree. Nelson taught school at Naisberry, Spalding, Simpson and Yorkton. In 1948, he married Isobelle Louise Long. He was defeated by Lorne Aubrey McLaren when he ran for reelection to the Saskatchewan assembly in 1982. As of 2011, Nelson was living in Saskatoon. Nelson died on July 30, 2023, at the age of 97.
