= David Forbes (politician) =

Canadian politician

The Honourable David Forbes ECS

Member of the Saskatchewan Legislative Assembly for Saskatoon Centre Saskatoon Idylwyld (2001-2003)
- In office November 8, 2001 – September 29, 2020
- Preceded by: Janice MacKinnon
- Succeeded by: Betty Nippi-Albright

Personal details
- Born: 1956 (age 69–70)
- Party: New Democratic Party

David Forbes (born 1956) is a former Canadian provincial politician. He was the Saskatchewan New Democratic Party member of the Legislative Assembly of Saskatchewan (MLA) for the constituency of Saskatoon Centre from 2001 to 2020. Forbes serves as the Minister of Environment and of Labour, and as Opposition critic for Labour, Housing, Saskatchewan Housing Corporation, Saskatchewan Worker's Compensation Board, and Diversity, Equality and Human Rights.

== Family life and education ==
Before entering politics, Forbes taught for 18 years in both Saskatoon and rural Saskatchewan. He received his Bachelor of Education from the University of Regina (with Distinction, 1982) and a Master's degree in Education Administration from the University of Saskatchewan (1996). Forbes last taught in the Saskatoon Public School Division where he held many positions with the Saskatchewan Teachers' Federation (STF) and the Saskatoon Teachers' Association.

Forbes has been a volunteer for his local community association, the Sasktel Saskatchewan Jazz Fest, and as a coach of youth football and softball. He is a past president of Cross Country Saskatchewan and the Nordic Ski Club of Saskatoon.

Forbes was raised in a farming family at Mortlach, Saskatchewan. Forbes is married with three grown children and five grandchildren.

== Political life ==
=== 2001 by-election ===
Forbes was first elected in a by-election for Saskatoon Idylwyld in November 2001 with 57.09% of the vote. During his time as a back-bencher, Forbes was Legislative Secretary for School PLUS and sat on the Standing Committees for the Crown Corporations and Agriculture.

In the fall of 2002, Forbes served as vice-chair of the Premier's Voluntary Sector, which produced Saskatchewan's Voluntary Sector: Reflecting Our Strength.

=== 2003-2006: Minister of Environment ===
Before the 2003 election the Saskatoon Idylwyld constituency was dissolved and the Saskatoon Centre constituency was created. David Forbes ran in the new constituency in the 2003 Saskatchewan general election winning the seat with 61.85% of the vote

Forbes was appointed to Executive Council as Minister of Environment, with responsibilities for the Office of Energy Conservation and the Saskatchewan Watershed Authority. During his tenure, he released Caring for Natural Environments: A Biodiversity Action Plan for Saskatchewan's Future 2004-2009, the first major environmental blueprint in Western Canada. Other initiatives included Saskatchewan's Green Strategy, Conserving our Water, A Water Conservation Plan for Saskatchewan and The Great Sand Hills Land Use Strategy. Under Forbes' direction, a greater proportion of the Great Sand Hills were protected from 94.5 to 362.6 square kilometres creating a balance between ecological protection and gas and natural resource development.

In 2003, Forbes was presented the Special Merit Award for service and support to Saskatoon's lesbian and gay community at the Gay and Lesbian Awards (GALA).

=== 2006-2007: Minister of Labour ===
On February 3, 2006, Forbes was appointed Minister of Labour, with responsibilities for SaskWater. During his time as Labour Minister, advancements were seen in the fight against bullying in the workplace. "Effective on October 1, 2007, the statutory definition of harassment in Saskatchewan was expanded to include personal harassment in the workplace, such as the abuse of power and bullying, under amendments to the Occupational Health and Safety Act. In addition to broadening the definition of harassment, a special adjudicator position was created to resolve harassment appeals independently."

As Minister of Labour, Forbes was responsible for implementing Saskatchewan's newest holiday - Family Day and the Improving Work Opportunities Report which included raising the provincial minimum wage to LICO standards. Many workplace safety improvements such as the anti-harassment unit and introducing labour standards in the North also took place during his time as Minister of Labour.

=== 2007-2011: Opposition Critic ===
In November 2007, Forbes was again elected as the MLA for the Saskatoon Centre constituency with 57.36% of the vote. The Saskatchewan Party won control of the Saskatchewan government and the Saskatchewan NDP became the official opposition. Forbes sat as the Opposition critic for Social Services, Disabilities, Housing and the Community Based Organization Sector.

In November 2010, Forbes introduced a Private Member's Bill to protect service animals, such as guide dogs and police dogs. One week after introducing this bill it became law as a part of The Animal Protection Act.

In April 2011, Forbes introduced a second Private Member's Bill, "The Saskatchewan Respectful Language Act," which would see phrases and words such as 'mental retardation,' 'retarded' or 'retard' found in government legislation, regulations and materials replaced with the use of 'intellectual disability.' The law was based on President Barack Obama's 'Rosa's Law.' The legislation was re-introduced by government and passed into law on May 18, 2011. Forbes received the Francis Schaan Award from People First Saskatchewan for his "outstanding commitment to promote respectful language in government."

As critic for housing, Forbes called on the government "to come forward with a comprehensive affordable housing strategy and poverty reduction strategy, and to address the underlying causes of the crisis." As part of addressing the shortage of housing in the province and raising rents, Forbes championed a push for the implementation of rent controls.

=== 2011-2016: Opposition Critic and Caucus Chair ===
In November 2011, Forbes was re-elected as the MLA for Saskatoon Centre with 54% of the vote. His colleagues elected Forbes to be Caucus Chair. From 2011 to March 2013 Forbes sat as Opposition critic for Labour, Municipal Affairs, Housing, Saskatchewan Worker's Compensation Board, Enterprise Saskatchewan and Saskatchewan Water Corporation.

In December 2011, Forbes introduced Jimmy's Law, a bill to help protect workers' physical safety during late-night shifts. The Law's namesake is Jimmy Ray Wiebe who was shot twice in the early morning hours of June 20, 2011 during his late night shift at a gas station in Yorkton. Jimmy's Law was proposed as an amendment to the Occupational Health and Safety Act. The bill required employers to either schedule a minimum of two employees for late night shifts or ensure that an individual worker is safe behind a locked door or barrier.

In November 2012, Forbes' hard work led to an increase in safety regulations for late-night retail workers. The government added new regulations that include a check-in system and personal emergency transmitters for all employees working alone in late-night retail establishments. The changes fell short of Jimmy's Law to make employers schedule at least two employees per shift at night.

Also in the fall of 2012, Forbes led a tour of public meetings in nine communities throughout Saskatchewan to consult on the Sask. Party government’s planned overhaul of all workplace and employment laws and its controversial discussion paper guiding the process. A report was released in October 2012 summarizing the findings of this tour.

In March 2013, with the election of Cam Broten as leader of the Saskatchewan NDP, Forbes was appointed as Opposition critic for Labour, Education, Housing, Saskatchewan Housing Corporation, Saskatchewan Worker's Compensation Board, and Diversity, Equality and Human Rights.

As Ethics critic Forbes raised several questions surrounding cabinet Minister June Draude’s travel expenses while on a trip to London, England in 2014, asking “Did she use the limo service for sightseeing or shopping with her friends?".

Ultimately Draude repaid the $3600 spent on a car service during the trip. He also raised questions around Sask. Party MLA Paul Merriman’s departure from the Saskatoon Food Bank and Learning Centre.

In his role as critic for Diversity, Equality and Human Rights, Forbes began presenting petitions asking for the addition of 'gender identity' and 'gender expression' to the list of protected categories in Saskatchewan's Human Rights Code. Forbes added his voice to the pressure from the community and in December 2014, the Saskatchewan Human Rights Code was amended to include 'gender identity' as a prohibited ground.

Forbes and the Opposition NDP also asked many questions about protecting students against bullying. These concerns led to the introduction of Bill 612 - The Respect for Diversity Student Bill of Rights Act in April 2015. Among other rights, this bill will ensure students who request a GSA (Gender and Sexuality Alliance or Gay-Straight Alliance) at school cannot be denied. It also gives students the right to have any cyber-bullying or other bullying concerns properly addressed by their school administration; and that students have the right to have any disability appropriately accommodated. Ultimately Bill 612 died on the order paper.

=== 2016-2020: Final Term ===
Forbes was re-elected in April 2016 with 54% of the popular vote. Forbes remained as critic for Labour, Ethics & Democracy, Equality and Human Rights and as Caucus Chair until 2019 serving 8 years in that position.

He continued to fight for human rights for ASL (American Sign Language), as an official language of instruction Heritage Language supports, and for modernizing the Opening Prayer in the Legislature a contentious issue for many.

In May 2018, Forbes discovered that Saskatchewan public servants who self-declared as having a disability were 2.1% of the public service, a 27% decrease from 5 years earlier and not 12.4%, as set by the Saskatchewan Human Rights Commission. Forbes argued “the reduction in opportunities for people with disabilities is just not acceptable”.

Forbes again challenged the Sask. Party’s Ethics performance. In 2017, Ken Cheveldayoff, Minister of Central Services, speculated about sales of the government’s 660 buildings. Forbes raised the potential conflict of interest as Cheveldayoff has ownership stake in two real estate companies and received substantial donations from three companies with real estate interests during his run for the Sask. Party leadership. Speaker Mark Docherty had Forbes apologize for his questions. In the media, Cheveldayoff accused Forbes of a “personal attack” however columnist Murray Mandryk wrote that Forbes' line of questioning was fair and noted that Speaker Mark Docherty “bizarrely and wrongly” made Forbes apologize for even raising the question.

The Opposition had raised concerns over the government’s handling of issues coming from the northern village of Pinehouse regarding alleged mismanagement, disregard of FOI requests and inappropriate relations with the Sask. Party including Donna Harpauer, Minister of Finance. As Ethics critic, Forbes raised this issue 8 times in Question Period and wrote to the Conflict of Interest Commissioner twice. On February 19, 2020, Forbes said, “The information released today on the Village of Pinehouse raises far more questions than it answers. Robertson’s inspection and Vancise’s inquiry come to drastically different conclusions. The Sask. Party government must not be allowed to sweep further examination of this issue under the rug.

Throughout his last session, Forbes repeatedly petitioned the Sask. Party government to ban donations from corporations and unions for political parties. He often pushed for a ban, especially on donations from out of province corporations questioning that such donations may have helped topping up the Premier’s salary and stated that "Saskatchewan democracy is for Saskatchewan people”.

As a result, David introduced The Election Fairness and Accountability Act twice, first as Bill 602 in the spring of 2017 then as Bill 606 in the fall of 2017; it was defeated both times by the Sask. Party government.

In 2018 Forbes condemned the Sask. Party government’s announcement that it would pay 13 MLAs a combined $50,000 as legislative secretaries. He said they “haven’t produced much work in the last number of years”; a FOI request for records of work done revealed that no records were available.

This was not the first time David raised concerns, in 2015, he criticized Legislative Secretary MLA Greg Lawrence who was unable to show any documents related to his work concerning foster families. Forbes confirmed “We understand from press that he travelled around, but there are no notes…. There’s no record and there’s no written recommendations through him that were provided through the FOIs”.

In 2018 Forbes introduced The By-Election Dates Act. Defeated by the Sask. Party, it aimed to close a loophole in which by-elections are not required when a seat becomes vacant. Forbes protested that Regina Walsh Acres and Saskatoon Eastview would be without MLAs for over a year following the resignation of MLAs Steinley and Tocher who ran for federal seats while sitting as Sask. Party MLAs.

Forbes also introduced The Public Disclosure of Travel and Expenses of Government Officials Act in March 2020 caused by a $1690 estimate to get the Premier’s travel expenses through an FOI; Forbes stated “Premier and minister’s expenses should be fully public, full stop”.

Janna’s Law, an amendment to The Saskatchewan Employment Act (SEA) was passed in March 2020. In the Legislature, Forbes praised this as a step towards truth and reconciliation dubbing the amendment “Janna’s Law” in honour of Janna Pratt of Gordon First Nations. Pratt argued SEA did not give job protection for First Nations people who sought election on their Band Council. Forbes said “This is a good thing for the government to do, especially in the spirit of truth and reconciliation. It seems like an oversight for decades to our colonial eyes”.

Forbes, after being convinced by Nicole White and Jai Richards that fairness for queer parents was acutely needed, introduced The All Families are Equal Act. Forbes discussed this with Minister of Justice who agreed to meet with Nicole and Jai. The issue was referred to the Saskatchewan Law Reform Commission. Their report, Assisted Reproduction & Parentage was released in late 2018. It formed the basis of The Children’s Law Act, 2019 passing in 2020. Section 7 of this act mirrored David’s earlier bill causing David to call the section Alice’s Law after Nicole and Jai’s daughter.

In March 2020, The Covid-19 Pandemic hit hard forcing a provincial lockdown including the closure of the legislative spring session. When the Legislature re-opened in June, Forbes introduced a Private Members bill calling for better WCB protection for workers. Forbes gave his final speech in the Saskatchewan Legislature on July 3, 2020.

Forbes announced that he would not seek re-election in 2020. After winning his seat in four general elections and one by-election, he plans on spending more time with family, particularly his grandchildren.

== Electoral record ==
2016 Saskatchewan general election: Saskatoon Centre
Party	Candidate	Votes	%
New Democratic	David Forbes	3,005	57.08
Saskatchewan	Brad Hoffmann	1,928	36.62
Liberal	Roman M. Todos	203	3.86
Green	Kathryn McDonald	129	2.45
Total		5,265	99.60

2011 Saskatchewan general election: Saskatoon Centre
Party	Candidate	Votes	%
New Democratic	David Forbes	2,790	54.00
Saskatchewan	David Cooper	2,218	42.93
Green	Daeran Gall	159	3.08
Total		5,167	100

2007 Saskatchewan general election: Saskatoon Centre
Party	Candidate	Votes	%
New Democratic	David Forbes	3,707	57.36
Saskatchewan	Jonathan Abrametz	1,929	29.853
Liberal	Derek Morrison	565	8.74
Green	Nathan Risling	150	2.32
Marijuana	Nathan Holowaty	112	1.73
Total		6,463	100

2003 Saskatchewan general election: Saskatoon Centre
Party	Candidate	Votes	%
New Democratic	David Forbes	3,607	61.85
Saskatchewan	Roger Parent	1,165	19.98
Liberal	Richard Clatney	907	15.55
Progressive Conservative	Betty Konkin	153	2.62
Total		5,831	100

Saskatchewan provincial by-election, November 8, 2001: Saskatoon Centre Resignation of Janice MacKinnon
Party	Candidate	Votes	%
New Democratic	David Forbes	2,129	57.09
Saskatchewan	Shelley Hengen	1,072	28.75
Liberal	Bob Roy	415	11.13
New Green	Dave Greenfield	68	1.82
IPS	Gordon Robert Dumont	45	1.21
Total		3,729	100.00
