= Cumberland (Saskatchewan provincial electoral district) =

Provincial electoral district in Saskatchewan, Canada

Saskatchewan electoral district

Provincial electoral district
- Legislature: Legislative Assembly of Saskatchewan
MLA
Jordan McPhail
New Democratic
- District created: 1912
- First contested: 1912
- Last contested: 2024

Demographics
- Population (2001): 18,988
- Region: Northern Saskatchewan
- Communities: La Ronge, Creighton

Cumberland is a provincial electoral district for the Legislative Assembly of Saskatchewan, Canada. It was created for the 1912 election, and was abolished into Prince Albert East-Cumberland in 1967. It was re-created for the 1975 election. It is the largest electoral district in the province, and at the 2007 general election was the safest seat for the New Democratic Party.

== History ==
The riding has a strong history of electing New Democrat MLAs, and that region has returned MLAs from the NDP and its predecessor party the Co-operative Commonwealth Federation since 1952. The closest that the NDP came to losing the riding was in the 2008 by-election, which was narrowly won with 49.73% of the popular vote and a plurality of 164.

== Member of the Legislative Assembly ==
This riding has elected the following members of the Legislative Assembly:

Legislature	Years	Member	Party
Cumberland
3rd	1912–1913		
3rd	1913–1917	Deakin Hall	Liberal
4th	1917–1921	Deakin Hall	Liberal
5th	1921–1922	George Langley	Liberal
5th	1922–1925	Deakin Hall	Liberal
6th	1925–1929	Deakin Hall	Liberal
7th	1929–1934	Deakin Hall	Liberal
Riding abolished into Athabasca
9th	1938–1944	Deakin Hall	Liberal
10th	1944–1948	Leslie Walter Lee	Co-operative Commonwealth
11th	1948–1952	Lorne Earl Blanchard	Liberal
12th	1952–1956	Bill Berezowsky	Co-operative Commonwealth
13th	1956–1960	Bill Berezowsky	Co-operative Commonwealth
14th	1960–1964	Bill Berezowsky	Co-operative Commonwealth
15th	1964–1967	Bill Berezowsky	Co-operative Commonwealth
Riding dissolved into Prince Albert East-Cumberland
Riding re-created from Prince Albert East-Cumberland
18th	1975–1978	Norman MacAuley	New Democratic
19th	1978–1982	Norman MacAuley	New Democratic
20th	1982–1986	Lawrence Riel Yew	New Democratic
21st	1986–1991	Keith Goulet	New Democratic
22nd	1991–1995	Keith Goulet	New Democratic
23rd	1995–1999	Keith Goulet	New Democratic
24th	1999–2003	Keith Goulet	New Democratic
25th	2003–2007	Joan Beatty	New Democratic
26th	2007–2008	Joan Beatty	New Democratic
26th	2008–2011	Doyle Vermette	New Democratic
27th	2011–2016	Doyle Vermette	New Democratic
28th	2016–2020	Doyle Vermette	New Democratic
29th	2020–2024	Doyle Vermette	New Democratic
30th	2024–Present	Jordan McPhail	New Democratic

== Election results ==
=== Cumberland, 1975–present ===
==== 2024 ====
2024 Saskatchewan general election
Party	Candidate	Votes	%	±%
New Democratic	Jordan McPhail	2,289	55.10	-11.43
Saskatchewan	Gregory Seib	1,642	39.53	+8.81
Green	Siwichis Bird-Paddy	173	4.16	+1.41
Independent	Nasser Dean Chalifoux	50	1.20	-
Total valid votes		4,154		
Total rejected ballots				
Turnout				
Eligible voters				
New Democratic hold		Swing		
Source: Elections Saskatchewan

==== 2020 ====
2020 Saskatchewan general election
Party	Candidate	Votes	%	±%
New Democratic	Doyle Vermette	2,807	66.53	+4.22
Saskatchewan	Darren Deschambeault	1,296	30.72	+0.99
Green	Aaron Oochoo	116	2.75	+1.29
Total valid votes		4,219	98.94	
Total rejected ballots		45	1.06	+0.61
Turnout		4,264	29.34	-9.59
Eligible voters		14,533		
New Democratic hold		Swing		+1.61
Source: Elections Saskatchewan

==== 2016 ====
2016 Saskatchewan general election
Party	Candidate	Votes	%	±%
New Democratic	Doyle Vermette	3,375	62.31	-0.88
Saskatchewan	Thomas Sierzycki	1,610	29.72	-3.70
Liberal	George Morin	352	6.49	–
Green	Mick Taylor-Lessard	79	1.45	-1.94
Total valid votes		5,416	100.0	
Eligible voters		–		
New Democratic hold		Swing		-
Source: Elections Saskatchewan

==== 2011 ====
2011 Saskatchewan general election
Party	Candidate	Votes	%	±%
New Democratic	Doyle Vermette	3,319	63.19	+13.46
Saskatchewan	Joe Hordyski	1,755	33.42	–11.10
Green	Samuel Hardlotte	178	3.39	–2.37
Total valid votes		5,252	100.0	
New Democratic hold		Swing		+12.28

==== 2008 by-election ====
Saskatchewan provincial by-election, 25 June 2008 On the resignation of Joan Beatty
Party	Candidate	Votes	%	±%
New Democratic	Doyle Vermette	1,564	49.73	–16.23
Saskatchewan	Dale McAuley	1,400	44.52	+21.55
Green	Tory McGregor	181	5.76	–0.45
Total valid votes		3,145	100.0	
New Democratic hold		Swing		–18.89

==== 2007 ====
2007 Saskatchewan general election
Party	Candidate	Votes	%	±%
New Democratic	Joan Beatty	3,124	65.96	–3.04
Saskatchewan	Winston McKay	1,088	22.97	+1.24
Green	Harold Johnson	294	6.21	–
Liberal	Heath Muggli	230	4.86	–3.29
Total valid votes		4,736	100.0	
New Democratic hold		Swing		–2.14

==== 2003 ====
2003 Saskatchewan general election
Party	Candidate	Votes	%	±%
New Democratic	Joan Beatty	3,281	69.00	+0.02
Saskatchewan	Winston McKay	1,035	21.73	+12.08
Liberal	Allan Adam	388	8.15	–9.86
Progressive Conservative	Ari Avivi	54	1.12	–2.24
Total valid votes		4,758	100.0	
New Democratic hold		Swing		–6.03

==== 1999 ====
1999 Saskatchewan general election
Party	Candidate	Votes	%	±%
New Democratic	Keith Goulet	2,402	68.98	–5.40
Liberal	Winston McKay	627	18.01	–2.05
Saskatchewan	Don Johannesson	336	9.65	–
Progressive Conservative	Quentin Douglas Agnew	117	3.36	–2.21
Total valid votes		3,482	100.0	
New Democratic hold		Swing		–1.68

==== 1995 ====
1995 Saskatchewan general election
Party	Candidate	Votes	%	±%
New Democratic	Keith Goulet	2,151	74.38	–6.35
Liberal	John Dorion	580	20.06	+10.20
Progressive Conservative	Tyson Delorme	161	5.57	–3.90
Total valid votes		2,892	100.0	
New Democratic hold		Swing		–8.28

==== 1991 ====
1991 Saskatchewan general election
Party	Candidate	Votes	%	±%
New Democratic	Keith Goulet	4,135	80.73	+19.99
Liberal	Lennard Morin	505	9.86	+1.51
Progressive Conservative	Louis Bear	482	9.47	–17.63
Total valid votes		5,122	100.0	
New Democratic hold		Swing		+9.24

==== 1986 ====
1986 Saskatchewan general election
Party	Candidate	Votes	%	±%
New Democratic	Keith Goulet	3,173	60.74	–4.37
Progressive Conservative	Larry Wolkosky	1,416	27.10	+5.90
Liberal	Robin W. Turner	436	8.35	+2.10
Independent	Gordon "Popeye" Carle	199	3.81	–
Total valid votes		5,224	100.0	
New Democratic hold		Swing		–5.14

==== 1982 ====
1982 Saskatchewan general election
Party	Candidate	Votes	%	±%
New Democratic	Lawrence Riel Yew	2,587	64.37	+5.17
Progressive Conservative	Edward N. Charlette	852	21.20	–6.55
Aboriginal People's	Leon E. McAuley	329	8.19	–
Liberal	Roy Fosseneuve	251	6.25	–5.79
Total valid votes		4,019	100.0	
New Democratic hold		Swing		+5.86

==== 1978 ====
1978 Saskatchewan general election
Party	Candidate	Votes	%	±%
New Democratic	Norman MacAuley	2,586	59.20	+14.57
Progressive Conservative	George L. Horne	1,256	28.75	+14.89
Liberal	Leon E. McAuley	526	12.04	–18.55
Total valid votes		4,368	100.0	
New Democratic hold		Swing		–0.16

==== 1975 ====
1975 Saskatchewan general election
Party	Candidate	Votes	%
New Democratic	Norman MacAuley	1,646	44.63
Liberal	Winston McKay	1,128	30.59
Progressive Conservative	Garry M. Houghton	511	13.86
Independent	Frank R. Tomkins	403	10.93
Total valid votes		3,688	100.0
New Democratic pickup new district.			

=== Cumberland, 1912–1967 ===
1964 Saskatchewan general election
Party	Candidate	Votes	%	±%
Co-operative Commonwealth	Bill Berezowsky	2,135	45.16	+0.70
Liberal	Eldon William McLachlan	1,630	34.48	+11.96
Progressive Conservative	Emanuel Sonnenschein	963	20.37	+2.80
Total valid votes		4,728	100.0	
Co-operative Commonwealth hold		Swing		–5.63

1960 Saskatchewan general election
Party	Candidate	Votes	%	±%
Co-operative Commonwealth	Bill Berezowsky	2,030	44.46	–0.07
Liberal	George Archie Anderson	1,028	22.51	–12.58
Progressive Conservative	Roman John Brunwald	802	17.56	–
Social Credit	Murray Grant Dennis	706	15.46	–4.91
Total valid votes		4,566	100.0	
Co-operative Commonwealth hold		Swing		+6.26

1956 Saskatchewan general election
Party	Candidate	Votes	%	±%
Co-operative Commonwealth	Bill Berezowsky	2,035	44.53	–7.93
Liberal	James H. W. Sanderson	1,604	35.10	–12.44
Social Credit	Albert Goddue	931	20.37	–
Total valid votes		4,570	100.0	
Co-operative Commonwealth hold		Swing		+2.26

1952 Saskatchewan general election
Party	Candidate	Votes	%	±%
Co-operative Commonwealth	Bill Berezowsky	2,538	52.46	+14.55
Liberal	George W. Newell	2,300	47.54	–10.98
Total valid votes		4,838	100.0	
Co-operative Commonwealth gain from Liberal		Swing		+12.76

1948 Saskatchewan general election
Party	Candidate	Votes	%	±%
Liberal	Lorne Earl Blanchard	656	58.52	+18.85
Co-operative Commonwealth	Joseph Johnson	425	37.91	–20.61
Independent	Joseph Maxim Buote	40	3.57	–
Total valid votes		1,121	100.0	
Liberal gain from Co-operative Commonwealth		Swing		+19.73

1944 Saskatchewan general election
Party	Candidate	Votes	%	±%
Co-operative Commonwealth	Leslie Walter Lee	357	58.52	–
Liberal	Deakin Hall	242	39.67	–50.91
Progressive Conservative	Raoul Olier St. Denis	11	1.8	–7.62
Total valid votes		610	100.0	
Co-operative Commonwealth gain from Liberal		Swing		+54.72

1938 Saskatchewan general election
Party	Candidate	Votes	%	±%
Liberal	Deakin Hall	548	90.58	+5.10
Conservative	George W. Smith	57	9.42	–
Total valid votes		605	100.0	
Liberal hold		Swing		–2.16

1934 Saskatchewan general election
Party	Candidate	Votes
Unknown	?	?

1929 Saskatchewan general election
Party	Candidate	Votes	%
Liberal	Deakin Hall	365	85.48
Independent	John Beda	62	14.52
Total valid votes		427	100.0

1925 Saskatchewan general election
Party	Candidate	Votes
Liberal	Deakin Hall	acclaimed

Saskatchewan provincial by-election, August 21, 1922 On the resignation of George Langley
Party	Candidate	Votes	%
Liberal	Deakin Hall	132	54.55
Liberal	Joseph Emile Lussier	57	23.55
Liberal	Gordon MacDonald	53	21.90
Total valid votes		242	100.0

1921 Saskatchewan general election
Party	Candidate	Votes
Liberal	George Langley	acclaimed

1917 Saskatchewan general election
Party	Candidate	Votes
Liberal	Deakin Hall	acclaimed

Saskatchewan provincial by-election, 8 September 1913 On the election being declared void
Party	Candidate	Votes	%
Liberal	Deakin Hall	57	52.29
Conservative	William Charles McKay	52	47.71
Total valid votes		109	100.0
Liberal pickup new district.			

1912 Saskatchewan general election
Party	Candidate	Votes
Declared void		

== See also ==
- List of Saskatchewan provincial electoral districts
- List of Saskatchewan general elections
- Canadian provincial electoral districts
