= Yorkton (provincial electoral district) =

Provincial electoral district in Saskatchewan, Canada

Coordinates: 51°12′N 102°42′W

Saskatchewan electoral district

Provincial electoral district
- Legislature: Legislative Assembly of Saskatchewan
MLA
David Chan
Saskatchewan
- District created: 1905
- First contested: 1905
- Last contested: 2024

Demographics
- Electors: 10,961
- Communities: Yorkton

Yorkton is a provincial electoral district for the Legislative Assembly of Saskatchewan, Canada. It has historically almost always voted for the governing party, selecting an opposition candidate only twice in its history (1938 & 1960).

It was created when Saskatchewan became a province, replacing the territorial electoral district by the same name, which was established in 1894. The current boundaries of the constituency were set by the Representation Act, 2012 (Saskatchewan).

Founded as "York City" in 1882, Yorkton (pop. 15,038) became a city on February 1, 1928.

== Members of the Legislative Assembly ==
Legislature	Years	Member	Party
10th	1943–1948	Arthur Percy Swallow	Saskatchewan Co-operative Commonwealth Federation
11th	1949–1952	Arthur Percy Swallow	Saskatchewan Co-operative Commonwealth Federation
12th	1953–1956	Arthur Percy Swallow	Saskatchewan Co-operative Commonwealth Federation
To be added
22nd	1991–1995	Clay Serby	New Democratic
23rd	1995–1999	Clay Serby	New Democratic
24th	1999–2003	Clay Serby	New Democratic
25th	2003–2007	Clay Serby	New Democratic
26th	2007–2011	Greg Ottenbreit	Saskatchewan Party
27th	2011–2016	Greg Ottenbreit	Saskatchewan Party
28th	2016–2020	Greg Ottenbreit	Saskatchewan Party
29th	2020–2024	Greg Ottenbreit	Saskatchewan Party
30th	2024–present	David Chan	Saskatchewan Party

== Election results (1991–present) ==
2024 Saskatchewan general election
Party	Candidate	Votes	%	±%
Saskatchewan	David Chan	3,513	51.79	-22.61
New Democratic	Lenore Pinder	2,274	33.52	+10.92
Saskatchewan United	Doug Forster	818	12.06	–
Green	Valerie Brooks	136	2.01	-0.89
Buffalo	Timothy Kasprick	42	0.62	+0.42
Total valid votes		6,783	99.41	
Total rejected ballots		40	0.59	–
Turnout		6,823	52.74	–
Eligible voters		12,937		
Saskatchewan hold		Swing		–
Source: Elections Saskatchewan

2020 provincial election redistributed results
Party	%
Saskatchewan	74.4
New Democratic	22.6
Green	2.9
Buffalo	0.2

2020 Saskatchewan general election
Party	Candidate	Votes	%	±%
Saskatchewan	Greg Ottenbreit	4,171	74.01	+1.46
New Democratic	Carter Antoine	1,301	23.08	+0.42
Green	Judy Mergel	164	2.91	+1.05
Total valid votes		5,636	98.96	
Total rejected ballots		59	1.04	–
Turnout		5,695	–	–
Eligible voters		–		
Saskatchewan hold		Swing		–
Source: Elections Saskatchewan

2016 Saskatchewan general election
Party	Candidate	Votes	%	±%
Saskatchewan	Greg Ottenbreit	4,585	72.55	+0.10
New Democratic	Greg Olson	1,432	22.66	-3.04
Liberal	Aaron Sinclair	184	2.91	-
Green	Chad Gregoire	118	1.86	+0.01
Total valid votes		6,319	100.0	
Eligible voters		–		
Source: Elections Saskatchewan

Saskatchewan General Election 2011, Yorkton electoral district
Party	Candidate	Votes	%	±%
Saskatchewan	Greg Ottenbreit	5,446	72.45	+12.99
NDP	Chad Blenkin	1,932	25.70	-11.82
Green	Kathryn McDonald	139	1.85	–
Total		7,517	100.00	

Saskatchewan General Election 2007, Yorkton electoral district
Party	Candidate	Votes	%	±%
Saskatchewan	Greg Ottenbreit	5,005	59.46	+18.64
NDP	Randy Goulden	3,158	37.52	-14.01
Liberal	Joyce Landry	254	3.02	-1.77
Total		8,417	100.00	

Saskatchewan General Election 2003, Yorkton electoral district
Party	Candidate	Votes	%	±%
NDP	Clay Serby	3,993	51.53	+10.54
Saskatchewan	Randy Atkinson	3,163	40.82	+4.17
Liberal	Charles Gunning	371	4.79	-17.57
Western Independence	Bruce Ritter	222	2.86	–
Total		7,749	100.00	

Saskatchewan General Election 1999, Yorkton electoral district
Party	Candidate	Votes	%	±%
NDP	Clay Serby	2,893	40.99	-8.58
Saskatchewan	Lorne Gogal	2,587	36.65	–
Liberal	Richard Yaholnitsky	1,578	22.36	-16.19
Total		7,058	100.00	

Saskatchewan General Election 1995, Yorkton electoral district
Party	Candidate	Votes	%	±%
NDP	Clay Serby	3,588	49.57	-9.41
Liberal	David Bucsis	2,791	38.55	+19.76
Prog. Conservative	Howard W. Evans	860	11.88	-10.35
Total		7,239	100.00	

Saskatchewan General Election 1991, Yorkton electoral district
Party	Candidate	Votes	%	±%
NDP	Clay Serby	4,897	58.98	–
Prog. Conservative	Brian Fromm	1,846	22.23	–
Liberal	Donna Taylor Yaholnitsky	1,560	18.79	–
Total		8,303	100.00	

Saskatchewan General Election 1948, Yorkton electoral district
Party	Candidate	Votes	%	±%
CCF	Arthur Percy Swallow	3,795	42.91	–
Liberal	Andrew M. Kindred	3,256	36.82	–
Social Credit	Joshua N. Haldeman	1,792	20.26	–
Total		8,843	100.00	

== History ==
=== Members of the Legislative Assembly ===
#	MLA	Served	Party
1.	Thomas Henry Garry	1905–1929	Liberal
2.	Alan Carl Stewart	1929–1934	Independent
3.	Vincent Reynolds Smith	1934–1938	Liberal
4.	Alan Carl Stewart	1938–1944	Unity
5.	Arthur Percy Swallow	1944–1956	CCF
6.	Frederick Neibrandt	1956–1960	CCF
7.	Bernard David Gallagher	1960–1971	Liberal
8.	Irving Wensley Carlson	1971–1975	NDP
9.	Randall Neil Nelson	1975–1982	NDP
10.	Lorne Aubrey McLaren	1982–1991	PC
11.	Clay Serby	1991–2007	NDP
12.	Greg Ottenbreit	2007–present	Saskatchewan Party

== See also ==
- List of Saskatchewan provincial electoral districts
- List of Saskatchewan general elections
- Yorkton (territorial electoral district) — North-West Territories territorial electoral district
- Yorkton (federal electoral district)
- Canadian provincial electoral districts
