= Lorne McLaren =

Canadian politician

Lorne Aubrey McLaren (August 17, 1928 – January 4, 2009) is a former political figure in Saskatchewan. He represented Yorkton from 1982 to 1991 in the Legislative Assembly of Saskatchewan as a Progressive Conservative.

He was born in Saltcoats, Saskatchewan. McLaren was hired by Morris Rod Weeder Co, a farm implement manufacturing company, and worked his way up to become company president. He was also chairperson for the Prairie Implement Manufacturers Association. McLaren served in the provincial cabinet as Minister of Labour. From 1986 to 1991, he was government caucus chair. McLaren was later found to be a central figure in the Saskatchewan Progressive Conservative fraud scandal and served three and a half years in prison for fraud, theft and breach of trust. He died at the Regina General Hospital at the age of 80.
