= Keith Goulet =

Canadian politician

The Honourable Keith Goulet ECS

MLA for Cumberland
- In office October 20, 1986 – November 5, 2003
- Preceded by: Lawrence Yew
- Succeeded by: Joan Beatty

Personal details
- Born: April 3, 1946 (age 80) Cumberland House, Saskatchewan
- Party: New Democratic Party
- Children: Danis Goulet, Koonu Goulet

Keith Napoleon Goulet (born April 3, 1946) is a former Canadian politician, who represented the constituency of Cumberland in the Legislative Assembly of Saskatchewan from 1986 to 2003. A member of Peter Ballantyne Cree Nation, he was the first Aboriginal person appointed to the Executive Council of Saskatchewan.

== Life ==
He was born in Cumberland House, Saskatchewan in 1946, the son of Arthur Goulet and Veronique Carriere, and was educated in Cumberland House in Prince Albert, at teacher's college in Ontario, at the University of Saskatchewan, and at the University of Regina. Goulet taught elementary school, lectured at the University of Saskatchewan, was principal of La Ronge Community College and was executive director of the Gabriel Dumont Institute of Métis Studies and Applied Research. In 1974, he married Linda May Hemingway. He has two daughters, filmmaker Danis Goulet and Kona Goulet, as well as three grandchildren.

Goulet was the first Indigenous member of the provincial cabinet, serving as Provincial Secretary, as Associate Minister of Education, and as Minister of Northern Affairs. He retired from cabinet in October 2001 and retired from the legislature in 2003.

As of 2022, he was living in Prince Albert.
