= Doyle Vermette =

Canadian politician

Member of the Saskatchewan Legislative Assembly for Cumberland
- In office June 25, 2008 – October 1, 2024
- Preceded by: Joan Beatty
- Succeeded by: Jordan McPhail

Personal details
- Born: Prince Albert, Saskatchewan, Canada
- Party: New Democratic Party

Doyle Vermette is a Canadian politician. He was a member of the Legislative Assembly of Saskatchewan, representing the electoral district of Cumberland as a member of the New Democratic Party until 2024. He was first elected in a 2008 by-election, and was most recently re-elected in the 2020 general election.

== Political career ==
Vermette won a nomination race over two other candidates to run for the NDP in the Cumberland provincial electoral district by-election held on June 25, 2008, following the resignation of Joan Beatty from the legislature. He won the electoral district in the by-election defeating two other candidates. On election night, the results see-sawed back and forth between Vermette and Saskatchewan Party candidate Dale McAuley, with Vermette ultimately being elected with a majority of 164.

Vermette has served as the Opposition Whip in the Legislature. As of June 22, 2024, he served as the Official Opposition critic for Northern Affairs and as the associate critic for Truth and Reconciliation as well as for First Nations and Métis Relations. Vermette announced that he would not be a candidate in the 2024 provincial election.

== Electoral record ==
=== 2020 Saskatchewan general election ===
2020 Saskatchewan general election: Cumberland
Party	Candidate	Votes	%	±%
New Democratic	Doyle Vermette	2,807	65.31	+3.00
Saskatchewan	Darren Deschambeault	1,296	30.15	+0.43
Green	Aaron Oochoo	116	2.70	+1.25
Total valid votes		4,298	100.0	
Eligible voters		14,433		
New Democratic hold		Swing		-
Source: Elections Saskatchewan

=== 2016 Saskatchewan general election ===
2016 Saskatchewan general election: Cumberland
Party	Candidate	Votes	%	±%
New Democratic	Doyle Vermette	3,375	62.31	-0.88
Saskatchewan	Thomas Sierzycki	1,610	29.72	-3.70
Liberal	George Morin	352	6.49	–
Green	Mick Taylor-Lessard	79	1.45	-1.94
Total valid votes		5,416	100.0	
Eligible voters		–		
New Democratic hold		Swing		-
Source: Elections Saskatchewan

=== 2011 Saskatchewan general election ===
2011 Saskatchewan general election: Cumberland
Party	Candidate	Votes	%	±%
New Democratic	Doyle Vermette	3,319	63.19	+13.46
Saskatchewan	Joe Hordyski	1,755	33.42	–11.10
Green	Samuel Hardlotte	178	3.39	–2.37
Total valid votes		5,252	100.0	
New Democratic hold		Swing		+12.28

=== 2008 Cumberland by-election ===
Saskatchewan provincial by-election, 25 June 2008: Cumberland On the resignation of Joan Beatty
Party	Candidate	Votes	%	±%
New Democratic	Doyle Vermette	1,564	49.73	–16.23
Saskatchewan	Dale McAuley	1,400	44.52	+21.55
Green	Tory McGregor	181	5.76	–0.45
Total valid votes		3,145	100.0	
New Democratic hold		Swing		–18.89
