= Calvin Henry Glauser =

Canadian politician

Calvin Henry "Cal" Glauser (April 2, 1923 – February 5, 2007) was a bank employee and political figure in Saskatchewan. He represented Saskatoon Mayfair from 1982 to 1986 in the Legislative Assembly of Saskatchewan as a Progressive Conservative.

He was born in Delisle, Saskatchewan and was educated locally. In 1941, he moved to Saskatoon and joined the Royal Canadian Air Force, serving overseas in North Africa and England. In 1947, Glauser married Marjorie Schauss. He worked for the Royal Bank of Canada in Saskatoon and Regina, retiring in 1982. Glauser served as legislative secretary to the Minister of Health. He did not run for reelection in 1986, citing personal and family reasons.
