= Douglas Thomas McFarlane =

Canadian politician

Douglas Thomas McFarlane (January 4, 1918 – May 6, 1999) was a farmer, civil servant and political figure in Saskatchewan. He represented Qu'Appelle-Wolseley from 1956 to 1971 in the Legislative Assembly of Saskatchewan as a Liberal.

He was born in Wolseley, Saskatchewan, the son of Andrew and Ella McFarlane, and was educated in Summerberry. McFarlane worked on the family farm and then served in the Royal Canadian Air Force during World War II. In 1945, he married Frances Davidson. After the war, he farmed in the Peebles district. McFarlane served in the provincial cabinet as Minister of Municipal Affairs and as Minister of Agriculture. He was defeated by Terry Hanson when he ran for reelection to the provincial assembly in 1971. After retiring from politics, he joined the War Veterans Appeal Board, moving to Ottawa. When the board was relocated to Charlottetown, Prince Edward Island, he moved there. After his retirement in 1983, McFarlane moved to Winnipeg, Manitoba, where he later died at the age of 81.
