= Arthur Percy Swallow =

Canadian politician

Arthur Percy Swallow (October 25, 1893 – January 28, 1985) was a farmer, farm implement dealer and political figure in Saskatchewan. He represented Yorkton from 1944 to 1956 in the Legislative Assembly of Saskatchewan as a Co-operative Commonwealth Federation (CCF) member.

He was born in Gladstone, Manitoba, the son of James B. Swallow, a native of Leeds, England, and moved with his family to a homestead near Willowbrook, Saskatchewan in 1902. Swallow served overseas during World War I. In 1922, he married Helen E. Ferguson. That same year, Swallow opened a hardware business in Willowbrook. Around 1925, he moved to Theodore, Saskatchewan, where he operated a hardware store and the local Massey Ferguson dealership. He later served as manager of the Yorkton Credit Union. Swallow died in Yorkton at the age of 91.

Swallow Beach in Good Spirit Lake Provincial Park was named in his honour.
