= Anne deBlois Smart =

Canadian politician

Anne deBlois Smart (December 8, 1935 – May 17, 2024) was a librarian and political figure in Saskatchewan. She represented Saskatoon Centre from 1986 to 1991 in the Legislative Assembly of Saskatchewan as a New Democratic Party (NDP) member.

She came to Saskatoon with her daughter in 1972 to work as a professional librarian at the Saskatoon Public Library. She became politically active and, in 1986, ran in the provincial election as a New Democratic Party candidate for the constituency of Saskatoon Centre serving for five years as its MLA. She studied at Saskatoon Seniors Continued Learning, serving on its Board of Directors at a time when the university was proposing to discontinue its support for the program. She successfully organized support for retaining the program.
