= Frederick Neibrandt =

Canadian politician, educator, and farmer

Frederick Neibrandt (August 26, 1900 – November 21, 1987) was an educator, farmer and political figure in Saskatchewan. He represented Yorkton from 1956 to 1960 in the Legislative Assembly of Saskatchewan as a Co-operative Commonwealth Federation (CCF) member.

He was born in Ebenezer, then part of the North-West Territories, the son of Kasper Neibrandt and Mary Nicholas. Neibrandt was educated in Ebenezer, in Yorkton, at the University of Manitoba and at the Yorkton Normal School. He married Lillian Bailey in 1924. Neibrandt taught school in Otthon before moving to Detroit, where he was employed in construction and worked for General Motors. In 1935, he moved to the Rhein, Saskatchewan area, where he farmed. Neibrandt was defeated when he ran for reelection to the Saskatchewan assembly in 1960. Neibrandt was a member of the Yorkton Chamber of Commerce; the Yorkton Board of Trade and the Hudson Bay Rail Association. He was also president of the Rhein Curling Club. Neibrandt died in Rhein at the age of 87.
