= Betty Nippi-Albright =

Canadian politician

Betty Nippi-Albright MLA

Member of the Saskatchewan Legislative Assembly for Saskatoon Centre
- Incumbent
- Assumed office October 26, 2020
- Preceded by: David Forbes

Personal details
- Party: Independent
- Other political affiliations: New Democratic (2020–2026)
- Education: University of Saskatchewan (HBASc, MA)

Betty Nippi-Albright is a Canadian politician who was elected to the Legislative Assembly of Saskatchewan in the 2020 Saskatchewan general election. She represents the electoral district of Saskatoon Centre, serving as a member of the Saskatchewan New Democratic Party until 2026. She currently sits as an independent.

Hailing from the Kinistin First Nation, Nippi-Albright is of Saulteaux and Cree ancestry and is a residential school survivor. She is the only Indigenous MLA currently serving in Saskatchewan.

Nippi-Albright raised concerns about First Nations communities during the COVID-19 pandemic in Saskatchewan.

As of June 22, 2024, she serves as the Deputy Chair of the Official Opposition caucus and as the Official Opposition critic for First Nations and Métis Relations, for Truth and Reconciliation, and for Innovation and the Saskatchewan Research Council.

On May 5, 2026, Nippi-Albright left the NDP caucus to sit as an independent, citing differences with the party's leader, Carla Beck. She stated she would continue to represent Saskatoon Centre in the legislature.
