= Frank Quennell =

Canadian politician (born 1956)

The Honourable Frank Quennell ECS

Member of the Saskatchewan Legislative Assembly for Saskatoon Meewasin
- In office November 5, 2003 – October 10, 2011
- Preceded by: Carolyn Jones
- Succeeded by: Roger Parent

Personal details
- Born: 1956 (age 69–70) Regina, Saskatchewan

Frank Quennell (born 1956 in Regina, Saskatchewan) was a New Democratic Party MLA for the provincial constituency of Saskatoon Meewasin, covering part of Saskatoon, Saskatchewan, Canada.

== Biography ==
He attended the University of Saskatchewan and graduated in 1982 with a Bachelor of Arts in English literature and in 1985 with a Bachelor of Laws. From July 1986 to November 2003, Quennell practiced law in Saskatoon and in 1995 became a partner with the law firm of Robertson Stromberg, now Robertson Stromberg Pedersen LLP.

Quennell has been actively involved in his community. From 1992 until 1995, he was a member of the board of directors of the Northern Enterprise Fund Inc. He served as a member of the board of governors of the University of Saskatchewan from 1995 to 2001 and was the board's elected chair from 1999 until 2001. He was elected to the board of directors of the Child Hunger and Education Program in 2001 and elected to the board of directors of the Saskatoon and District Co-operative Association in 2002. He was a founding member of the Saskatoon Health Region Authority in 2002.

== Political career ==
Quennell was first elected to the Saskatchewan Legislature in the provincial general election of November 5, 2003. The NDP government of Premier Lorne Calvert was returned to office in that election. On November 21, 2003, Premier Calvert appointed Quennell as attorney general and Minister of Justice, as well as the Minister Responsible for SaskPower. He was made a member of the Crown Management Board. Later on, he was made Minister Responsible for the Information Technology Office.

Quennell was re-elected to the Saskatchewan Legislative Assembly in the general election on November 7, 2007, However, the NDP were defeated and the Saskatchewan Party took office under Premier Brad Wall. For the next four years, Quennell served in Opposition, starting as the Official Opposition critic for the Department of Enterprise and Innovation.

Quennell stood for re-election in the 2011 general election, but was defeated.
