= Janice MacKinnon =

Canadian historian and politician

The Honourable Janice MacKinnon CM ECS SOM FRSC

Member of the Saskatchewan Legislative Assembly for Saskatoon Idylwyld
- In office June 21, 1995 – September 30, 2001
- Preceded by: Eric Cline
- Succeeded by: David Forbes

Member of the Saskatchewan Legislative Assembly for Saskatoon Westmount
- In office October 21, 1991 – June 21, 1995
- Preceded by: John Edward Brockelbank
- Succeeded by: Eric Cline

Personal details
- Born: Janice Potter; January 30, 1947 (age 79) Kitchener, Ontario
- Party: New Democratic Party
- Education: University of Western Ontario; Queen's University
- Occupation: Academic

Janice MacKinnon, C.M., S.O.M., FRSC (born January 30, 1947) is a Canadian academic and former politician who served as a Member of the Legislative Assembly of Saskatchewan (MLA) from 1991 to 2001, and as Minister of Finance under New Democratic Party Premier Roy Romanow. She is currently a professor in the School of Public Health at the University of Saskatchewan.

== Early life and education ==
Born Janice Potter in Kitchener, Ontario, she attended Huron University College of the University of Western Ontario, which awarded her a bachelor's degree in 1969. She went on to earn a master's degree and doctorate from Queen's University. She joined the University of Saskatchewan in 1975.

== Political career ==
From 1991 to 2001, MacKinnon was a Member of the Legislative Assembly of Saskatchewan (MLA). In addition to being Minister of Finance from 1993 to 1997, she also held the following ministerial positions at various times: Minister of Social Services, Minister of Economic and Co-operative Development, Minister Responsible for Trade, Research and Investment, and Government House Leader. As Finance Minister, she was known by the nickname "Combat Barbie" for her conviction to cut spending in a bid to recover the province's finances, which were in near ruin when Grant Devine's Progressive Conservative government was swept from power in 1991.

MacKinnon resigned from the Cabinet of new NDP leader Lorne Calvert on March 2, 2001, and resigned her seat in the Legislature on September 30. David Forbes replaced her when he won a November 8 by-election. In 2003, she published a book entitled Minding the Public Purse about her time as Finance Minister and fiscal policy in Canada.

In 2003, MacKinnon was rumoured to be considering running for the Liberal Party of Canada in the following year's federal election, but she ultimately declined.

== Post-political life and career ==
After resigning from the Saskatchewan Legislature, MacKinnon returned to teaching at the University of Saskatchewan.

She is chair of the board of directors of the Institute for Research on Public Policy. She also sits on the board of directors for the Canada West Foundation. In 2008, MacKinnon was named Chair of the Board of Investment Saskatchewan, a Saskatchewan Crown Corporation managing investment capital and financing.

MacKinnon sits as an advisor to Canada's Ecofiscal Commission, was appointed as chair of the Blue Ribbon Panel on Alberta’s Finances by Alberta Premier Jason Kenney, and was named to the first tribunal formed under the Saskatchewan First Act, which was tasked with examining the economic impact of proposed federal clean electricity regulations. MacKinnon also serves as a member of the University of Alberta's Board of Governors.

In 2024, during a meeting of the University of Alberta Board of Governors, MacKinnon proposed eliminating the University of Alberta's EDI Office.

== Personal life ==
MacKinnon is married to Peter MacKinnon, a former president of the University of Saskatchewan. They were married in 1974 and have two children.

In 2005, MacKinnon was made a Fellow of the Royal Society of Canada. In 2012, she was named to the Order of Canada. In 2013, she was named one of the Top 25 women of influence in Canada's public sector.

== Electoral record ==
1999 Saskatchewan general election: Saskatoon Idylwyld
Party	Candidate	Votes	%
New Democratic	Janice Mackinnon	3,144	53.89
Saskatchewan	Martin Boser	1,333	22.85
Liberal	Tim Ponto	977	16.75
New Green	Maisie Shiell	258	4.42
Progressive Conservative	Kenneth J. Klassen	122	2.09
Total		5,834	100.00

1995 Saskatchewan general election: Saskatoon Idylwyld
Party	Candidate	Votes	%
New Democratic	Janice Mackinnon	4,064	62.94
Liberal	Bonnye Georgia	1,646	25.49
Progressive Conservative	Kent Latimer	747	11.57
Total		6,457	100.00

1991 Saskatchewan general election: Saskatoon Westmount
Party	Candidate	Votes	%
New Democratic	Janice Mackinnon	5,505	65.33
Liberal	Myron Luczka	1,913	22.70
Progressive Conservative	George Turanich	1,008	11.96
Total		8,426	100.00

== Selected bibliography ==
- The Liberty We Seek: Loyalist Ideology in Colonial New York and Massachusetts (1983) (ISBN 0674530268)
- While the Women Only Wept: Loyalist Refugee Women (1993) (ISBN 0773513175)
- Minding the Public Purse: The Fiscal Crisis, Political Trade-offs and Canada's Future (2003) (ISBN 0773527494)
