= Lorne Earl Blanchard =

Canadian politician

Lorne Earl Blanchard (June 6, 1883 – 1967) was an American-born machinist and political figure in Saskatchewan. He represented Cumberland from 1948 to 1952 in the Legislative Assembly of Saskatchewan as a Liberal.

He was born in San Antonio, Texas, the son of C.L. Blanchard and Caroline Woodbury, and was educated in Cleveland, Ohio. Blanchard went on to serve in the United States Marine Corps and came to Canada in 1906. In 1910, he married Myrtle Cousins. He served on the town council for Creighton, Saskatchewan and on the local school board. Blanchard was also a justice of the peace and a registrar for vital statistics. He worked for the Saskatchewan Department of Highways and as a foreman for the Hudson Bay Mining and Smelting Company and taught six years in the machine shop at the University of Saskatchewan. Around 1958, Blanchard moved to Saskatoon.
