= Joan Beatty =

Canadian politician

The Honourable Joan Beatty ECS

Member of the Legislative Assembly of Saskatchewan for Cumberland
- In office November 5, 2003 – January 10, 2008
- Preceded by: Keith Goulet
- Succeeded by: Doyle Vermette

Personal details
- Born: 1940 (age 85–86) Deschambault Lake, Saskatchewan, Canada
- Party: Liberal Party of Canada
- Other political affiliations: Saskatchewan New Democratic Party

Joan Beatty (born 1940) is a Canadian politician. She was the Saskatchewan New Democratic Party (NDP) member of the Legislative Assembly of Saskatchewan for the constituency of Cumberland. On January 3, 2008 she was appointed the Liberal Party of Canada's candidate for the House of Commons of Canada in Desnethé—Missinippi—Churchill River for the March 17, 2008 by-election.

However, she lost the federal by-election to Conservative candidate Rob Clarke. She was born in 1940, at Deschambault Lake, Saskatchewan.

== Provincial career ==
A former CBC journalist, Beatty became the first Aboriginal woman elected to the Saskatchewan legislature when she was elected on November 5, 2003. She was appointed to cabinet a month later as Minister of Culture Youth and Recreation and Provincial Secretary. Beatty was re-elected in the 2007 general election that defeated the NDP government and sat as Opposition Critic for Women's Issues and Northern Affairs.

== Federal politics ==
In 2007 she was approached by both the federal NDP and the federal Liberal party to run in the Desnethé—Missinippi—Churchill River by-election. Beatty told the press that she would decide by January 2008 whether she will run federally and for which party. On January 3, 2008 Beatty was selected as the Liberal candidate for the riding. She accepted the Liberals' offer and was appointed the party's candidate by leader Stéphane Dion on January 3.

Beatty defended her decision to switch from the provincial NDP to the federal Liberals saying that the Liberals have a better chance of taking power and "the one thing that I have found out [is] that you have to be in government to have say when it comes to policy or budget decisions or raising issues at that level." She said she was initially approached by the federal Liberals in the summer of 2007 but decided to run provincially in hopes that the Lorne Calvert-led Saskatchewan NDP government would be returned to office.

Beatty's appointment as the Liberal candidate angered supporters of anti-free trade activist David Orchard who had earlier announced his candidacy for the Liberal nomination. Metis leader Jim Durocher wrote a letter to Dion complaining about his decision to appoint a candidate rather than allow for party members to vote in a nomination meeting. He argued that "the people of this riding resent, and I personally resent mightily, the attitude of certain southerners that they know what's best for our riding." Durocher, a former Liberal candidate and Orchard supporter, also told Dion "If you impose Joan Beatty, the Liberals will lose this riding."

National Liberal campaign co-chair David Smith defended Beatty's appointment by saying that Dion had made getting more women into politics a priority, saying that the party is "prepared to bite the bullet to demonstrate that our commitment to increasing our number of women candidates - particularly well-qualified ones - is very real."

Beatty ultimately lost the ensuing byelection by a substantial margin. Nonetheless, she sought the Liberal nomination again for the forthcoming 40th Canadian federal election, this time in an open vote of the Liberal riding association with Orchard also a candidate. Orchard won the nomination.

== Electoral record ==
Canadian federal by-election, March 17, 2008: Desnethé—Missinippi—Churchill River
Party	Candidate	Votes	%	±%
Conservative	Rob Clarke	4,996	47.75	+6.66
Liberal	Joan Beatty	3,287	31.42	−9.95
New Democratic	Brian Morin	1,839	17.58	+2.21
Green	Robin Orr	340	3.25	+1.09

2007 Saskatchewan general election: Cumberland
Party	Candidate	Votes	%	±%
NDP	Joan Beatty	3,124	65.96%	-3.04%
Saskatchewan	Winston McKay	1,088	22.97%	+1.24%
Green	Harold Johnson	293	6.21%	+6.21%
Liberal	Heath Muggli	230	4.86%	-3.29%
Total		4,736	100.00%	

2003 Saskatchewan general election: Cumberland
Party	Candidate	Votes	%	±%
NDP	Joan Beatty	3,268	69.00%	
Saskatchewan	Winston McKay	1,029	21.73%	–
Liberal	Allan Adam	386	8.15%	
Progressive Conservative	Ari Avivi	53	1.12%	
Total		4,736	100.00%	
