= Beverly Milton Dyck =

Canadian politician

- Known for: Politician

Beverly Milton "Bev" Dyck (May 18, 1936 – August 11, 2012) was an educator and political figure in Saskatchewan. He represented Saskatoon City Park from 1971 from 1975 and Saskatoon Mayfair from 1975 to 1982 in the Legislative Assembly of Saskatchewan as a New Democratic Party (NDP) member.

He was born in Laird, Saskatchewan, the son of John H. Dyck, and was educated at the University of Saskatchewan. In 1962, Dyck married Loretta Gawdun. He taught commerce in high school. After leaving provincial politics, Dyck served on Saskatoon City Council as a councillor from 1985 to 1994. He died at the age of 78 of progressive supranuclear palsy.
