= Jordan McPhail =

Canadian politician

Jordan McPhail MLA
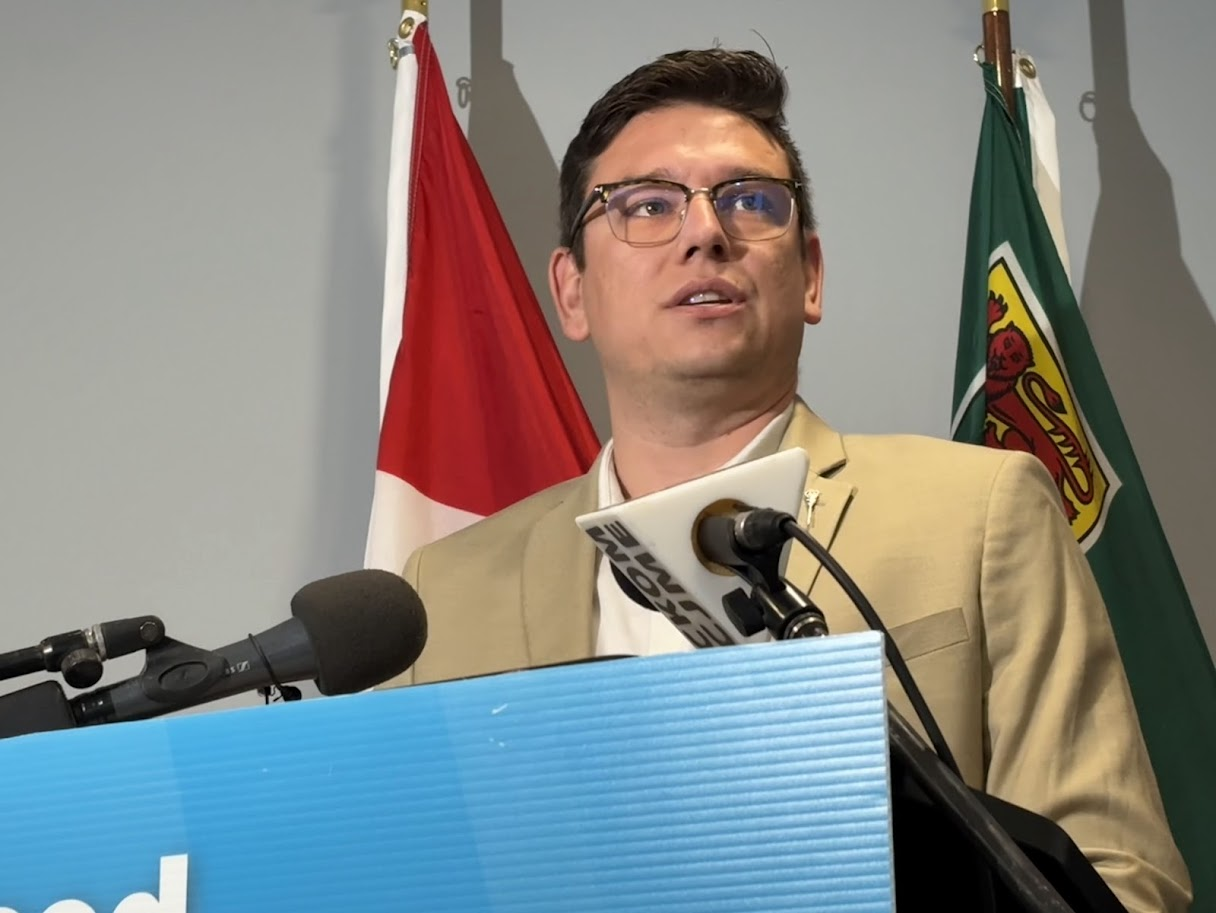

Member of the Saskatchewan Legislative Assembly for Cumberland
- Incumbent
- Assumed office October 28, 2024
- Preceded by: Doyle Vermette

Shadow Minister of Northern Affairs, Forestry, and SaskTel
- Incumbent
- Assumed office November 13, 2024
- Preceded by: Doyle Vermette

Personal details
- Party: Saskatchewan NDP

Jordan McPhail is a Canadian politician who was elected to the Legislative Assembly of Saskatchewan in the 2024 general election, representing Cumberland as a member of the Saskatchewan New Democratic Party.

Prior to his election, he served on the La Ronge, Saskatchewan town council. He is a member of the Lac La Ronge Indian Band.
