= Terry Lyle Hanson =

Canadian politician

MLA for Qu'Appelle-Wolseley
- In office 28 July 1971 – 13 May 1975
- Preceded by: Douglas Thomas McFarlane
- Succeeded by: Cyril Pius MacDonald

Personal details
- Born: 1944 (age 81–82)
- Party: Saskatchewan New Democratic Party

Terry Lyle Hanson (born 1944) is a Canadian politician who the Member of the Legislative Assembly of Saskatchewan for Qu'Appelle-Wolseley from 1971 to 1975.
