= Carolyn Jones (politician) =

Canadian politician

Assembly Member for Saskatoon Meewasin
- In office 1999–2003
- Preceded by: Carol Teichrob
- Succeeded by: Frank Quennell

Personal details
- Born: 1944

Carolyn Jones (born 1944) is a Canadian politician, who represented the electoral district of Saskatoon Meewasin in the Legislative Assembly of Saskatchewan, from 1999 to 2003. She was a member of the Saskatchewan New Democratic Party.
