= Mike Feschuk =

Canadian politician

Michael Feschuk (January 6, 1932 – November 12, 2007) was a farmer, real estate agent, civil servant and political figure in Saskatchewan. He represented Prince Albert East from 1971 to 1975 and Prince Albert from 1975 to 1982 in the Legislative Assembly of Saskatchewan as a New Democratic Party (NDP) member.

He was born in Meath Park, Saskatchewan and was educated there. He later took over the operation of the family farm. In 1953, he married Helen Mychaluk. Feschuk worked as a real estate agent during the 1980s and later worked for Statistics Canada. He was defeated by John Meagher when he ran for reelection to the Saskatchewan assembly in 1982.
