= Leslie Walter Lee =

Canadian politician

Leslie Walter Lee (May 23, 1896 – 1998) was an American-born farmer and political figure in Saskatchewan. He represented Cumberland from 1944 to 1948 in the Legislative Assembly of Saskatchewan as a Co-operative Commonwealth Federation (CCF) member.

He was born in Fergus Falls, Minnesota, the son of Olaf Lee and Christine Fedge, both natives of Norway. Lee served in the United States Army during World War I. He moved to Canada in 1921. In 1946, he married Janice Irene Wilson. Lee lived in Choiceland, Saskatchewan. Lee turned 100 in 1996, and died in 1998.
