= Roger Parent (Canadian politician) =

Canadian politician

MLA in the Legislative Assembly of Saskatchewan
- In office November 7, 2011 – November 29, 2016
- Preceded by: Frank Quennell
- Succeeded by: Ryan Meili
- Constituency: Saskatoon Meewasin

Personal details
- Born: July 21, 1953 Prince Albert, Saskatchewan
- Died: November 29, 2016 (aged 63) Saskatoon, Saskatchewan
- Party: Saskatchewan Party
- Spouse: Sheila Parent
- Education: SIAST (Mechanical Engineering Technology); University of Saskatchewan (Business Administration)

Roger Denis Parent (July 21, 1953 – November 29, 2016) was a Canadian politician who was elected to the Legislative Assembly of Saskatchewan in the 2011 election. He represented the electoral district of Saskatoon Meewasin as a member of the Saskatchewan Party caucus. Parent died of cancer at age 63, just hours after his diagnosis was made public on November 29, 2016, and within two weeks of being diagnosed.
