= Warden Burgess =

Canadian politician

Warden Burgess (December 21, 1899 – February 13, 1979) was a political figure in Saskatchewan. He represented Qu'Appelle-Wolseley from 1944 to 1948 in the Legislative Assembly of Saskatchewan as a Co-operative Commonwealth Federation (CCF) member.

Born in Ontario, he came to Sintaluta, Saskatchewan with his family in 1903. Burgess served as a delegate for his district to the Saskatchewan Wheat Pool from 1937 to 1941 and was a Wheat Pool director from 1949 to 1955. He also served as secretary for the Co-operative Hail Insurance Company and as president of the Co-operative Trust Company. Burgess served as a director of the Anti-Tuberculosis League. He was defeated when he ran for reelection to the provincial assembly in 1948.
