= Carol Teichrob =

Canadian politician (1939–2022)

The Honourable Carol Teichrob ECS

Assembly Member for River Heights, Saskatoon
- In office 1991–1995

Assembly Member for Saskatoon Meewasin
- In office 1995–1999
- Succeeded by: Carolyn Jones

Personal details
- Born: Carol Sproxton; August 27, 1939 Carrot River, Saskatchewan, Canada
- Died: December 18, 2022 (aged 83) Prince George, British Columbia, Canada
- Spouse: Donald P. Teichrob
- Occupation: Farming operation

Carol Teichrob (née Sproxton; August 27, 1939 – December 18, 2022) was a Saskatchewan politician, member of the legislative assembly (MLA) for eight years. She was an agricultural producer for 35 years, and also served as councillor and reeve of the Rural Municipality (RM) of Corman Park ten years.

== Biography ==
=== Marriage and children ===
Teichrob and her husband Donald have three children, as well as seven grandchildren and two great grandchildren.

Teichrob died in Prince George, British Columbia on December 18, 2022.

=== Political career ===
Teichrob became a member of the legislative assembly (MLA) first representing the former electoral districts of River Heights, Saskatoon 1991–1995. Teichrob (New Democrat party) represented Saskatoon Meewasin in the 1995 Saskatchewan general election held June 21, 1995. Teichrob was the incumbent for Saskatoon Meewasin in the 1999 Saskatchewan general election held September 16, 1999. Teichrob retired and Carolyn Jones became the new MLA. Carol Teichrob was a former Saskatchewan NDP MLA and Cabinet Minister, who switched parties to become a Conservative Party supporter.

Premier Roy Romanow thanked Teichrob on March 31, 1999 for her contributions to the province of Saskatchewan. As Education minister (1991) she energised Saskatchewan Communications Network (SCN), and was instrumental in the formation of Saskatchewan's Francophone school system. In 1995 as Minister of Municipal Government, she helped implement the Northern Roundtable dialog and brought the local assessments up to date across Saskatchewan. She assisted the provincial Arts Board to come to fruition. Teichrob increased revenue and decreased administrative costs by contracting the Western Canada Lottery Corporation (WCLC) under the Ontario Lottery Corporation (OLC).

== Party switch ==
Teichrob joined the Co-operative Commonwealth Federation (CCF) youth party at a young age of 13. During the fall of 2007, she was the co-chair for the NDP's provincial campaign. In the spring of 2008, she supported a SHRA colleague, Kelly Block, Conservative candidate running in the federal riding of Saskatoon-Rosetown-Biggar.

== Community work ==
Teichrob has been active as a director for a number of organisations including the Farm Credit Corporation, the Canadian Federation of Agriculture and the Saskatchewan Research Council. She belonged to the University of Saskatchewan Senate and the Saskatoon Chamber of Commerce.

The arts are people programs. Concerts, exhibitions, plays, gallery openings, readings, craft fairs, children's festivals and film screenings are all opportunities for people to come together to experience creative ideas, learn about themselves and others and use this experience in their own lives which in turn contributes to the growth and development of the province. Art makes a difference in how we think about our world, it enriches and enhances our daily lives. For 50 years the Arts Board has made a contribution to this process.

— Carol Teichrob; 50th anniversary of the passage of The Arts Board Act, 1949.

== Awards ==
Teichrob was the recipient of the YWCA Woman of the Year award in the Business category. She also received the Golden Wheel award for Industry and Commerce from the Rotary Club in 1990.
