= Norman MacAuley =

Canadian politician

MLA for Cumberland
- In office 1975–1982

Personal details
- Born: August 10, 1917 La Ronge, Saskatchewan, Canada
- Died: July 6, 2016 (aged 98) Kelowna, British Columbia, Canada
- Party: Saskatchewan New Democratic Party
- Spouse: Hetty Smith

Norman Hector MacAuley (August 10, 1917 – July 6, 2016) was a political figure in Saskatchewan. He represented Cumberland from 1975 to 1982 in the Legislative Assembly of Saskatchewan as a New Democratic Party (NDP) member.

He was born in La Ronge, Saskatchewan. From 1933 to 1941, he worked as a fisherman and freighter. MacAuley then served in France and Britain with the Canadian Army during World War II. From 1950 to 1956, he was manager of the Saskatchewan government trading stores at Deschambeault and Pinehouse. MacAuley then served as special constable for the Royal Canadian Mounted Police at La Ronge. From 1965 to 1972, he operated a tourist camp in the La Ronge area. Having been elected M.L.A. for Cumberland Constituency in 1975, MacAuley served as Legislative Secretary to Ted Bowerman in the assembly and later as Legislative Secretary to Jerry Hammersmith from 1978 to 1982, providing advice on a draft new Northern Municipalities Act. He died in Kelowna, British Columbia on July 6, 2016.
