= 21st Saskatchewan Legislature =

The 21st Legislative Assembly of Saskatchewan was elected in the Saskatchewan general election held in October 1986. The assembly sat from December 3, 1986, to September 2, 1991. The Progressive Conservative Party led by Grant Devine formed the government. The New Democratic Party (NDP) led by Allan Blakeney formed the official opposition. After Blakeney resigned in 1987, Roy Romanow became NDP leader.

Arnold Tusa served as speaker for the assembly.

== Members of the Assembly ==
The following members were elected to the assembly in 1986:

Electoral district	Member	Party	First elected / previously elected	No.# of term(s)
Arm River	Gerald Muirhead	Progressive Conservative	1978	3rd term
Assiniboia-Gravelbourg	Ralph Goodale	Liberal	1986	1st term
Assiniboia-Gravelbourg	John Wolfe (1988)	Progressive Conservative	1988	1st term
Athabasca	Fred Thompson	New Democratic Party	1975	4th term
Bengough-Milestone	Bob Pickering	Progressive Conservative	1978	3rd term
Biggar	Harry Baker	Progressive Conservative	1982	2nd term
Canora	Lorne Kopelchuk	Progressive Conservative	1986	1st term
Cumberland	Keith Goulet	New Democratic Party	1986	1st term
Cut Knife-Lloydminster	Michael Hopfner	Progressive Conservative	1982	2nd term
Estevan	Grant Devine	Progressive Conservative	1982	2nd term
Humboldt	Eric Upshall	New Democratic Party	1986	1st term
Indian Head-Wolseley	Doug Taylor	Progressive Conservative	1978	3rd term
Kelsey-Tisdale	Neal Hardy	Progressive Conservative	1980	3rd term
Kelvington-Wadena	Sherwin Petersen	Progressive Conservative	1982	2nd term
Kindersley	Bob Andrew	Progressive Conservative	1978	3rd term
Kinistino	Josef Saxinger	Progressive Conservative	1986	1st term
Last Mountain-Touchwood	Arnold Tusa	Progressive Conservative	1982	2nd term
Maple Creek	Joan Duncan	Progressive Conservative	1978	3rd term
Meadow Lake	George McLeod	Progressive Conservative	1978	3rd term
Melfort	Grant Hodgins	Progressive Conservative	1982	2nd term
Melfort	Grant Hodgins	Independent	1982	2nd term
Melville	Grant Schmidt	Progressive Conservative	1982	2nd term
Moose Jaw North	Glenn Hagel	New Democratic Party	1986	1st term
Moose Jaw South	Lorne Calvert	New Democratic Party	1986	1st term
Moosomin	Don Toth	Progressive Conservative	1986	1st term
Morse	Harold Martens	Progressive Conservative	1982	2nd term
Nipawin	Lloyd Sauder	Progressive Conservative	1982	2nd term
Pelly	Rod Gardner	Progressive Conservative	1986	1st term
Prince Albert	Myron Kowalsky	New Democratic Party	1986	1st term
Prince Albert-Duck Lake	Eldon Lautermilch	New Democratic Party	1986	1st term
Qu'Appelle-Lumsden	John Lane	Progressive Conservative	1971 (Note: First elected as a Liberal)	5th term
Quill Lakes	Murray Koskie	New Democratic Party	1975	4th term
Redberry	John Gerich	Progressive Conservative	1982	2nd term
Regina Centre	Ed Shillington	New Democratic Party	1975	4th term
Regina Elphinstone	Allan Blakeney	New Democratic Party	1960	8th term
Regina Elphinstone	Dwain Lingenfelter (1988)	New Democratic Party	1978, (Note: Shaunavon) 1988	3rd term*
Regina Lakeview	Louise Simard	New Democratic Party	1986	1st term
Regina North	Kim Trew	New Democratic Party	1986	1st term
Regina North East	Ed Tchorzewski	New Democratic Party	1971, (Note: Humboldt) 1985	5th term*
Regina North West	John Solomon	New Democratic Party	1979, 1986	2nd term*
Regina Rosemont	Robert Lyons	New Democratic Party	1986	1st term
Regina South	Jack Klein	Progressive Conservative	1982	2nd term
Regina Victoria	Harry Van Mulligen	New Democratic Party	1986	1st term
Regina Wascana	Gord Martin	Progressive Conservative	1986	1st term
Rosetown-Elrose	Herb Swan	Progressive Conservative	1978	3rd term
Rosthern	Bill Neudorf	Progressive Conservative	1986	1st term
Saltcoats	Walter Johnson	Progressive Conservative	1982	2nd term
Saskatoon Centre	Anne Smart	New Democratic Party	1986	1st term
Saskatoon Eastview	Ray Martineau	Progressive Conservative	1986	1st term
Saskatoon Eastview	Bob Pringle (1988)	New Democratic Party	1988	1st term
Saskatoon Fairview	Bob Mitchell	New Democratic Party	1986	1st term
Saskatoon Mayfair	Ray Meiklejohn	Progressive Conservative	1986	1st term
Saskatoon Nutana	Pat Atkinson	New Democratic Party	1986	1st term
Saskatoon Riversdale	Roy Romanow	New Democratic Party	1967, 1986	5th term*
Saskatoon South	Herman Rolfes	New Democratic Party	1971, 1986	4th term*
Saskatoon Sutherland	Mark Koenker	New Democratic Party	1986	1st term
Saskatoon University	Peter Prebble	New Democratic Party	1978, (Note: Saskatoon Sutherland) 1986	2nd term*
Saskatoon Westmount	John Brockelbank	New Democratic Party	1964, 1986	6th term*
Shaunavon	Theodore Gleim	Progressive Conservative	1986	1st term
Shellbrook-Torch River	Lloyd Muller	Progressive Conservative	1982	2nd term
Souris-Cannington	Eric Berntson	Progressive Conservative	1975	4th term
Swift Current	Pat Smith	Progressive Conservative	1982	2nd term
The Battlefords	Douglas Anguish	New Democratic Party	1986	1st term
Thunder Creek	Rick Swenson	Progressive Conservative	1985	2nd term
Turtleford	Colin Maxwell	Progressive Conservative	1982	2nd term
Weyburn	Lorne Hepworth	Progressive Conservative	1982	2nd term
Wilkie	John Britton	Progressive Conservative	1986	1st term
Yorkton	Lorne McLaren	Progressive Conservative	1982	2nd term

== Party Standings ==
Affiliation	Members
Progressive Conservative	38
New Democratic Party	25
Liberal	1
Total	64
Government Majority	12

== By-elections ==
By-elections were held to replace members for various reasons:

Electoral district	Member elected	Party	Election date	Reason
Regina Elphinstone	Dwain Lingenfelter	New Democratic Party	May 4, 1988	Allan Blakeney resigned
Saskatoon Eastview	Bob Pringle	New Democratic Party	May 4, 1988	Ray Martineau resigned
Assiniboia-Gravelbourg	John Wolfe	Progressive Conservative	December 15, 1988	Ralph Goodale ran for federal seat
