= 1978 Saskatchewan general election =

Canadian provincial election

- October 18, 1978

61 seats in the Legislative Assembly of Saskatchewan 31 seats needed for a majority
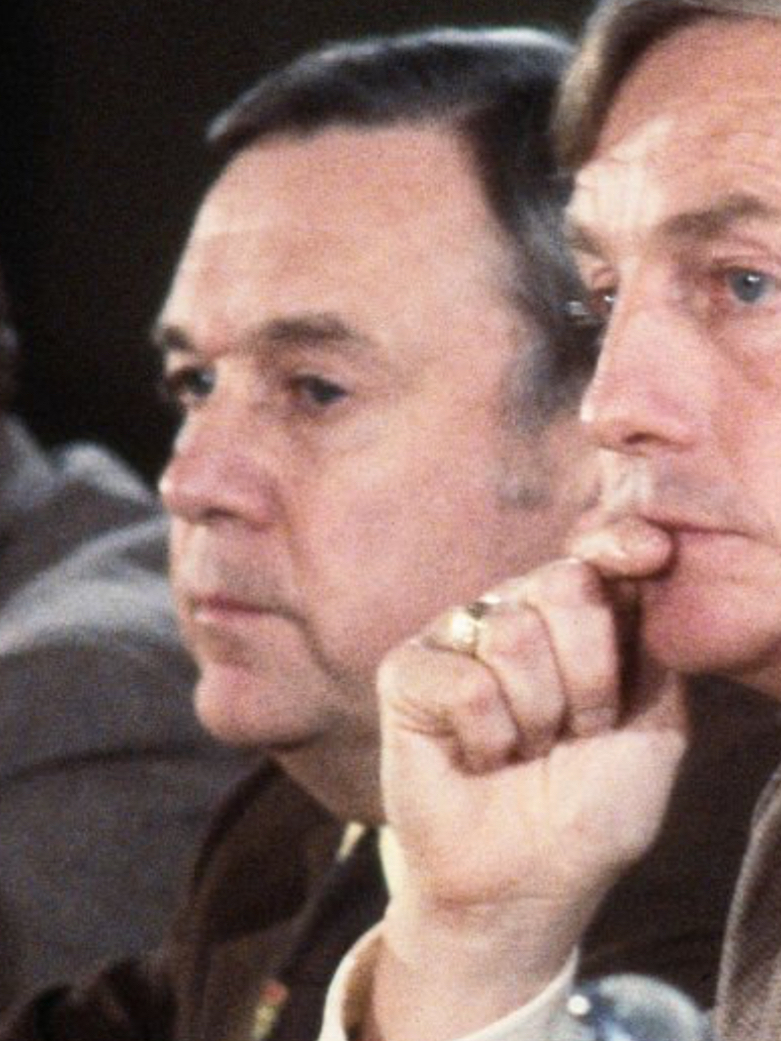

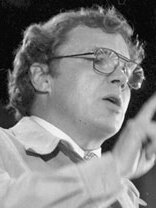

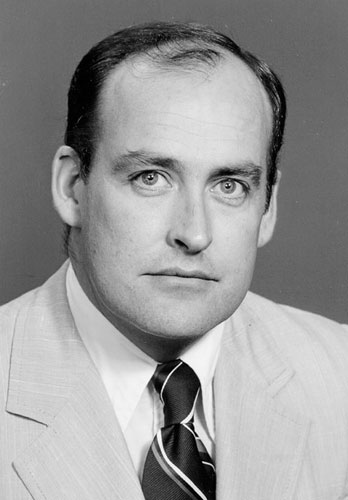
	First party	Second party	Third party
Leader	Allan Blakeney	Richard Collver	Ted Malone
Party	New Democratic	Progressive Conservative	Liberal
Leader since	July 4, 1970	March 18, 1973	December 11, 1976
Leader's seat	Regina Elphinstone	Nipawin	Regina Lakeview (lost re-election)
Last election	39	7	15
Seats before	39	11	11
Seats won	44	17	0
Seat change	▲5	▲6	▼11
Popular vote	228,791	181,045	65,498
Percentage	48.12%	38.08%	13.78%
Swing	▲8.05pp	▲10.46pp	▼17.89pp
Premier before election
Allan Blakeney
New Democratic
Premier after election
Allan Blakeney
New Democratic

The 1978 Saskatchewan general election was held on October 18, 1978, to elect members of the Legislative Assembly of Saskatchewan.

The New Democratic government of Premier Allan Blakeney was returned for a third consecutive term with an increased majority in the legislature, and a larger share of the popular vote.

The Progressive Conservative Party of Richard Collver continued to increase its share of the popular vote in this election. They were the only other party to win seats and became the official opposition to the Blakeney government.

Fierce political infighting in the Liberal Party after the resignation of leader David Steuart led to electoral disaster in 1978. The Liberals had lost two of the 15 seats they won in 1975 to by-elections and two more Grits crossed the floor to the Tories prior to the 1978 election. Under the disputed leadership of Ted Malone, the Liberals lost all of the 11 seats they still held in the legislature and more than half the votes it had won in the 1975 election.

== Results ==
Party	Party Leader	# of candidates	Seats				Popular Vote		
Party	Party Leader	# of candidates	1975	Dissol.	Elected	% Change	#	%	% Change
New Democratic	Allan Blakeney	61	39	39	44	+12.8%	228,791	48.12%	+8.05%
Progressive Conservative	Richard Collver	61	7	11	17	+54.5%	181,045	38.08%	+10.46%
Liberal	Ted Malone	61	15	11	–	-100%	65,498	13.78%	-17.89%
Independent		2	–	–	–	–	81	0.02%	-0.62%
Total		185	61	61	61	–	475,415	100%	
Source: Elections Saskatchewan

=== Percentages ===
Popular vote
New Democratic	48.12%
PC	38.08%
Liberal	13.78%
Others	0.02%

Seats summary
New Democratic	72.13%
PC	27.87%

=== Ranking ===
Party	Seats	Second	Third	Fourth
New Democratic	44	17	0	0
Progressive Conservative	17	41	3	0
Liberal	0	3	58	0
Independents	0	0	0	2

== Riding results ==
Names in bold represent cabinet ministers and the Speaker. Party leaders are italicized. The symbol " ** " indicates MLAs who are not running again.

=== Northwest Saskatchewan ===
Electoral district	Candidates				Incumbent
Electoral district	NDP	PC	Liberal	Other	Incumbent
Athabasca	Frederick John Thompson; 2,340	Frank Petit; 1,180	Henry Coupland; 498		Frederick John Thompson
Cut Knife-Lloydminster	Bob Long; 3,828	Bob Kent; 3,213	Bill Taylor; 259		Miro Kwasnica**
Meadow Lake	Gord McNeill; 2,789	George McLeod; 3,016	Colin Campbell; 537		Gordon James McNeill
Redberry	Dennis Banda; 3,325	John Gerich; 2,916	Peter Bomok; 491		Dennis George Banda
Rosthern	Howard Lucas; 3,162	Ralph Katzman; 4,708	Bill Patrick; 964		Ralph Katzman
The Battlefords	Eiling Kramer; 4,589	Rod McKenzie; 2,175	Mervin Zulyniuk; 1,427		Eiling Kramer
Turtleford	Lloyd Johnson; 2,983	Charlie Wells; 2,188	Pauline H. Cadrain; 620		Lloyd Emmett Johnson

November 26, 1980 By-election: The Battlefords
Party	Candidate	Votes	%	±%
NDP	David Miner	3,432	48.59%	-7.44
Prog. Conservative	Harry Zamonsky	2,143	30.34%	+3.79
Liberal	Thomas Bidart	1,488	21.07%	+3.65
Total		7,063	100.00	

=== Northeast Saskatchewan ===
Electoral district	Candidates				Incumbent
Electoral district	NDP	PC	Liberal	Other	Incumbent
Cumberland	Norm MacAuley; 2,586	George L. Horne; 1,254	Leon E. McAuley; 526		Norman H. MacAuley
Kelsey-Tisdale	John R. Messer; 4,031	Neil Hardy; 3,461	P. Hudson Foga; 527		John Rissler Messer
Kinistino	Don Cody; 4,042	Louis A. Domotor; 2,661	Robert G. Michayluk; 706		Arthur Thibault**
Melfort	Norm Vickar; 3,102	Bill Warner; 3,749	John W. Calderwood; 605		Norman Vickar
Nipawin	Irvin G. Perkins; 3,262	Richard Collver; 3,733	Ron J. Wassill; 568		Richard Lee Collver
Prince Albert	Mike Feschuk; 4,472	Richard E. Spencer; 3,514	Helga Reydon; 286		Mike Feschuk
Prince Albert-Duck Lake	Jerome Hammersmith; 3,618	Norm Wipf; 3,569	Colonel J. Archibald; 660		Norm Wipf
Shellbrook	George Bowerman; 3,835	John P. Meagher; 3,029	Manley R. McLachlan; 511		George Bowerman

November 26, 1980 By-election: Kelsey-Tisdale
Party	Candidate	Votes	%	±%
Prog. Conservative	Neil Hardy	3,334	48.39%	+5.23
NDP	Lars Bracken	3,232	46.91%	-3.36
Liberal	Jim Russell	324	4.70%	-1.87
Total		6,890	100.00	

=== West Central Saskatchewan ===
Electoral district	Candidates				Incumbent
Electoral district	NDP	PC	Liberal	Other	Incumbent
Arm River	Donald Leonard Faris; 3,308	Gerald Muirhead; 3,501	Greg Wensel; 1,101		Donald Leonard Faris
Biggar	Elwood L. Cowley; 4,787	Roy Norris; 3,270	Lynn Tokle; 552		Elwood Lorrie Cowley
Humboldt	Edwin Tchorzewski; 4,272	John Bajbula; 2,439	Peter Cline; 1,065		Edwin Tchorzewski
Kindersley	David G. Thomson; 2,461	Bob Andrew; 2,774	Allan McMillan; 1,937		Allan Neil McMillan
Rosetown-Elrose	Jim Mills; 3,056	**Herbert Swan**; 3,587	Calvin W. Fensom; 1,011		Roy Bailey**
Wilkie	Ray Heather; 2,371	Jim Garner; 2,865	Linda Clifford; 1,975		Linda Clifford

=== East Central Saskatchewan ===
Electoral district	Candidates				Incumbent
Electoral district	NDP	PC	Liberal	Other	Incumbent
Canora	Al Matsalla; 4,258	Eugene Teslia; 2,647	Joseph F. Matsalla; 730		Al Matsalla
Kelvington-Wadena	Neil Byers; 4,165	Ray Meiklejohn; 3,366	A. Ben Ferrie; 521		Neil Erland Byers
Last Mountain-Touchwood	Gordon MacMurchy; 4,150	Arnold Tusa; 3,795	Gill Fontaine; 385		Gordon S. MacMurchy
Melville	John Kowalchuk; 4,072	Glenn Miller; 3,465	Cecil Headrick; 901		John Russell Kowalchuk
Pelly	Norm Lusney; 3,739	Donald F. Boyd; 2,130	Rudolph Els; 760		Norm Lusney
Quill Lakes	Murray Koskie; 3,662	W. Brian Wildeman; 2,251	Mervyn T. Warner; 919		Murray James Koskie
Saltcoats	Ed Kaeding; 3,354	Walter R. Johnson; 3,265	Gabriel R. Neumeier; 680		Ed Kaeding
Yorkton	Randy Nelson; 4,128	Ray S. Malinowski; 3,637	Irene Konkin; 1,036		Randall Neil Nelson

=== Southwest Saskatchewan ===
Electoral district	Candidates				Incumbent
Electoral district	NDP	PC	Liberal	Other	Incumbent
Assiniboia-Gravelbourg	Allan Engel; 3,126	Wilf Lethbridge; 2,331	Roy Nelson; 2,662		Roy Nelson
Maple Creek	Norman Arndt; 2,327	Joan Duncan; 3,496	W.V. "Fred" Deis; 1,341		Bill Stodalka**
Moose Jaw North	John Skoberg; 4,483	Kerry R. Chow; 3,579	Gene Chura; 1,003		John Leroy Skoberg
Moose Jaw South	Gordon Snyder; 4,512	Arthur "Bud" Smith; 2,408	Terry W. Ocrane; 716		Gordon Taylor Snyder
Morse	Reg Gross; 2,587	Art Martens; 2,203	Jack Wiebe; 2,024		John Edward Niel Wiebe
Shaunavon	Dwain Lingenfelter; 2,778	Jim Lacey; 2,145	Eiliv "Sonny" Anderson; 2,385		Eiliv "Sonny" Anderson
Swift Current	Spencer Wooff; 3,288	Dennis Ham; 3,620	Stew Tasche; 936		Dennis Ham
Thunder Creek	D. Hicks; 2,424	Colin Thatcher; 3,359	Ron Gleim; 1,270		Wilbert Colin Thatcher

=== Southeast Saskatchewan ===
Electoral district	Candidates				Incumbent
Electoral district	NDP	PC	Liberal	Other	Incumbent
Bengough-Milestone	Jim Liggett; 3,069	Bob Pickering; 3,118	Rod MacDonald; 1,018		David Lange**
Estevan	Norman Blondeau; 2,703	Bob Larter; 4,376	Paul Bachorcik; 948		Robert Austin Larter
Indian Head-Wolseley	Pat Connolley; 2,400	Doug Taylor; 2,893	Cyril MacDonald; 1,943		Cyril Pius MacDonald
Moosomin	Fred A. Easton; 2,614	Larry Birkbeck; 3,353	J. Sinclair Harrison; 1,964		Larry Birkbeck
Qu'Appelle	Greg Willows; 6,844	John Gary Lane; 7,231	J. Don McCullough; 1,541		John Gary Lane
Souris-Cannington	Dean Fraser; 2,019	Eric Berntson; 3,739	Gerard Belisle; 1,170		Eric Arthur Berntson
Weyburn	Jim Pepper; 3,517	Glen Dods; 3,449	Ron Chapdelaine; 981		James Auburn Pepper

November 26, 1980 By-election: Estevan
Party	Candidate	Votes	%	±%
NDP	John Chapman	2,918	36.79%	+3.12
Prog. Conservative	Grant Devine	2,858	36.03%	-18.49
Liberal	Ralph Goodale	2,156	27.18%	+15.37
Total		7,932	100.00	

=== Saskatoon ===
Electoral district	Candidates				Incumbent
Electoral district	NDP	PC	Liberal	Other	Incumbent
Saskatoon Buena Vista	Herman Rolfes; 3,786	Reg Schafer; 2,343	Doris Serne; 1,272		Herman Harold Rolfes
Saskatoon Centre	Paul Mostoway; 5,246	Harry Baker; 2,743	Jean Korchin; 1,453		Paul Peter Mostoway
Saskatoon Eastview	Bernie Poniatowski; 4,018	Kimberly Young; 3,322	Marie Eaton; 1,257		Glen Penner**
Saskatoon Mayfair	Beverly Dyck; 4,328	Donna L. Birkmaier; 2,394	Dick Reed; 1,104		Beverly Dyck
Saskatoon Nutana	Wes Robbins; 4,739	Grant Devine; 2,466	John A. Shanks; 1,080		W. Albert Robbins
Saskatoon Riversdale	Roy Romanow; 5,225	Mary Cherneskey; 2,205	Nestor W. Romaniuk; 640		Roy Romanow
Saskatoon Sutherland	Peter Prebble; 5,007	Bill Lane; 4,722	Douglas R. Knott; 1,845		Harold William Lane
Saskatoon Westmount	**John Edward Brockelbank**; 5,651	Peter Shinkaruk; 2,427	Peter Sydney Groves; 909		John Edward Brockelbank

=== Regina ===
Electoral district	Candidates				Incumbent
Electoral district	NDP	PC	Liberal	Other	Incumbent
Regina Centre	Ned Shillington; 3,767	Keith Jeal; 1,451	George Exner; 935	William C. Beeching (Ind.) 45	Edward Shillington
Regina Elphinstone	**Allan Blakeney**; 4,390	Christine Whitaker; 1,250	R. Lawson Wilde; 596		**Allan Blakeney**
Regina Lakeview	Doug McArthur; 3,351	Ian McPherson; 1,684	Ted Malone; 2,366		Edward Cyril Malone
Regina North East	Walt Smishek; 4,831	F. Warren Denzin; 2,248	Del Miller; 805	Roger D. Annis (Ind.) 36	Walter Smishek
Regina North West	Ed Whelan; 5,575	Philip Lundeen; 3,142	J. Culliton Poston; 1,443		Edward Charles Whelan
Regina Rosemont	Bill Allen; 4,524	Florian Vanderlinde; 2,154	Gerry Bassendowski; 766		William J. G. Allen
Regina South	John Hettema; 3,114	Paul Rousseau; 3,325	Philip M. Desjardine; 1,688		Stuart Cameron**
Regina Victoria	Henry Baker; 3,729	Andrew G. Shepherd; 1,594	Glenn Caleval; 820		Henry Harold Peter Baker
Regina Wascana	Clint White; 3,993	Allan W. Wagar; 2,945	J. Duane Koch; 1,859		Anthony Merchant**

October 17, 1979 By-election: Regina North West
Party	Candidate	Votes	%	±%
NDP	John Solomon	3,354	47.75%	-7.12
Liberal	Ted Malone	2,211	31.47%	+17.27
Prog. Conservative	Philip Lundeen	1,460	20.78%	-10.15
Total		7,025	100.00	

== See also ==
- List of political parties in Saskatchewan
- List of Saskatchewan provincial electoral districts
