= 1986 Saskatchewan general election =

Canadian provincial election

- October 20, 1986

64 seats in the Legislative Assembly of Saskatchewan 33 seats needed for a majority
- Turnout: 82.1% (▼1.8pp)
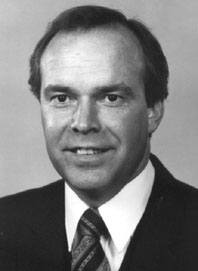

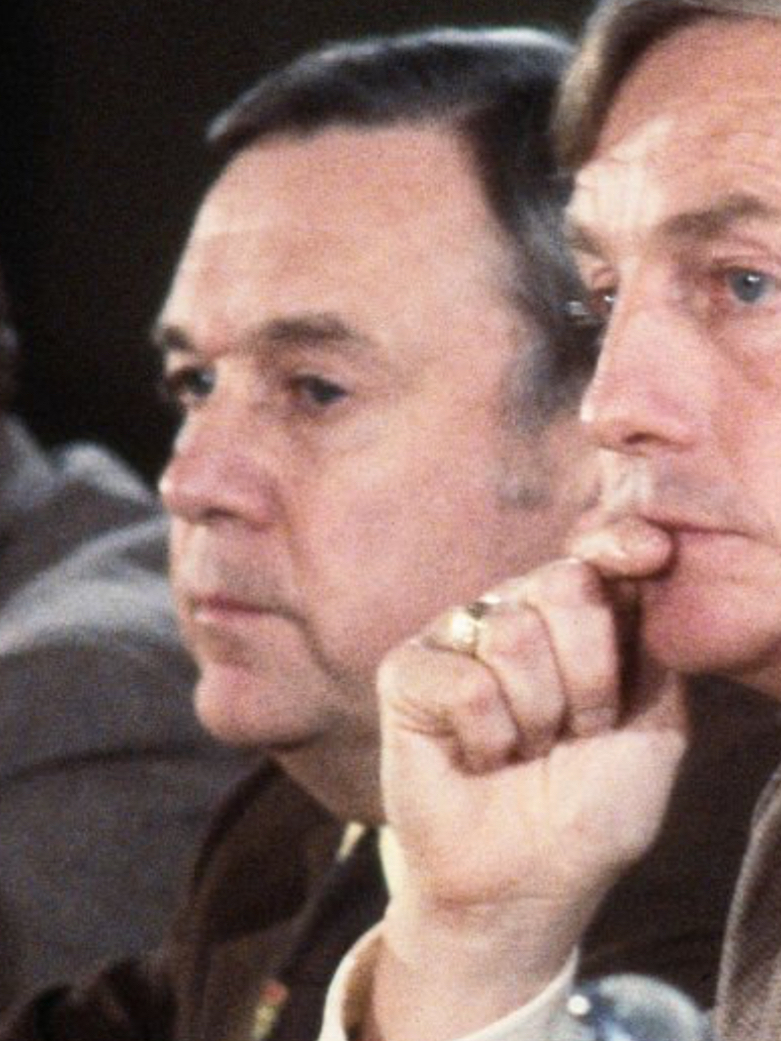

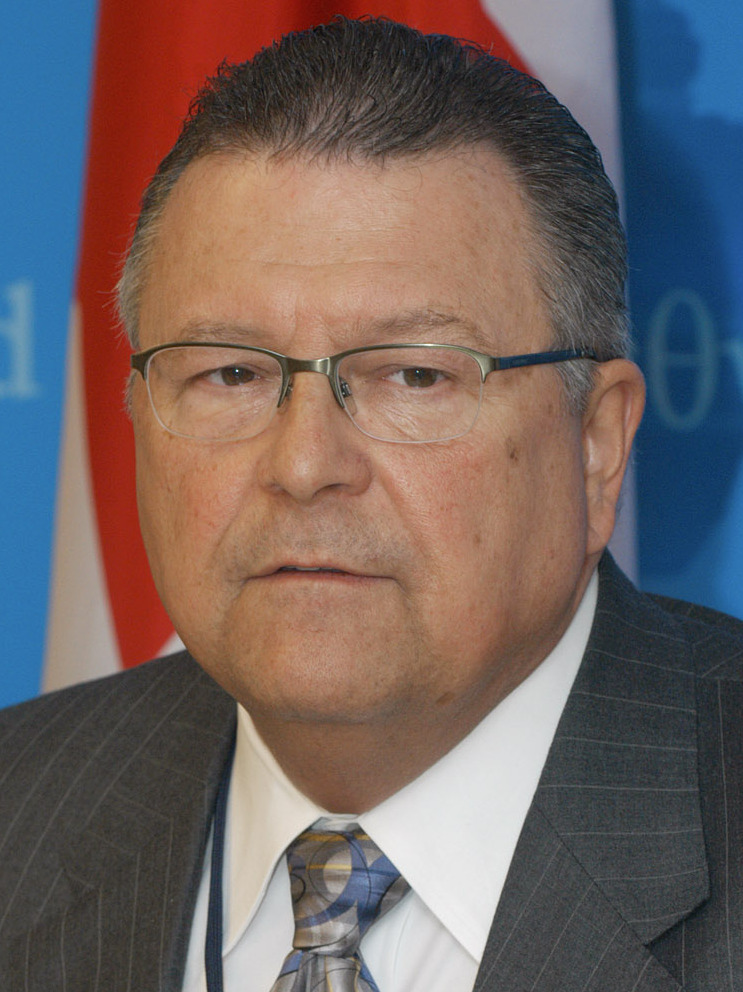
	First party	Second party	Third party
Leader	Grant Devine	Allan Blakeney	Ralph Goodale
Party	Progressive Conservative	New Democratic	Liberal
Leader since	November 9, 1979	July 4, 1970	June 13, 1981
Leader's seat	Estevan	Regina Elphinstone	Assiniboia-Gravelbourg
Last election	55	9	0
Seats before	54	8	0
Seats won	38	25	1
Seat change	▼16	▲17	▲1
Popular vote	244,382	247,683	54,739
Percentage	44.60%	45.20%	9.99%
Swing	▼9.45pp	▲7.56pp	▲5.48pp
Premier before election
Grant Devine
Progressive Conservative
Premier after election
Grant Devine
Progressive Conservative

The 1986 Saskatchewan general election, the twenty-first in the history of the province, was held on October 20, 1986, to elect members of the Legislative Assembly of Saskatchewan.

== Summary ==
The Progressive Conservative government of Premier Grant Devine was returned for a second term with a reduced majority in the legislature.

While the New Democratic Party managed to significantly increase its share of the popular vote and its presence in the legislature, former Premier Allan Blakeney's attempt to return to power was unsuccessful. Despite winning more votes than the Tories, much of the NDP margin was seen in landslides in the major urban centres of Regina and Saskatoon—while the party won eight seats in each of those cities, the NDP won only nine seats throughout the rest of the province. As a result, they were consigned to Official Opposition status for another term.

The Liberal Party captured almost 10% of the popular vote, but elected only one member—party leader Ralph Goodale—to the legislature.

== Opinion polls ==
Evolution of voting intentions at provincial level
Polling firm	Last day of survey	Source	PC	NDP	LIB	Other	Undecided	ME	Sample
Election 1986	October 20, 1986		44.60	45.20	9.99	0.21			547,930
Angus Reid	October 6, 1986		48	42	8	—N/a	—N/a	3.9	806
CBC	October 2, 1986		50	41	9	—N/a	—N/a	2.9	1,400
NDP	January 1986		41	51	8	—N/a	—N/a	5	1,024
Institute for Social Economic Research	February 3, 1986		42.9	46.7	9.3	—N/a	—N/a	4−5	567
Angus Reid	October 26, 1985		34	58	8	—N/a	18	5	415
Institute for Social Economic Research	October 3, 1985		43.8	46.3	9.3	—N/a	24	—N/a	—N/a
Election 1982	April 26, 1982		54.07	37.64	4.51	3.78			535,085

== Results ==
Party	Party leader	Candidates	Seats				Popular vote		
Party	Party leader	Candidates	1982	Dissol.	Elected	% Change	#	%	% Change
Progressive Conservative	Grant Devine	64	55	54	38	-29.6%	244,382	44.60%	-9.45%
New Democratic	Allan Blakeney	64	9	8	25	+212.5%	247,683	45.20%	+7.56%
Liberal	Ralph Goodale	64	–	–	1	n/a	54,739	9.99%	+5.48%
Western Canada Concept	Hilton J. Spencer (default)	9	–	2	–	-100%	458	0.08%	-3.18%
Independent		3	–	–	–	–	358	0.07%	-0.23%
Alliance		6	*	*	–	*	237	0.04%	*
Communist		1	*	*	–	*	73	0.01%	*
Total		211	64	64	64	–	547,930	100%	
Source: Elections Saskatchewan

Note: * Party did not nominate candidates in previous election.

=== Percentages ===
Popular vote
New Democratic	45.20%
PC	44.60%
Liberal	9.99%
Others	0.20%

Seats summary
PC	59.38%
New Democratic	39.06%
Liberal	1.56%

=== Ranking ===
Party	Seats	Second	Third	Fourth	Fifth
Progressive Conservative	38	24	2	0	0
New Democratic	25	38	1	0	0
Liberal	1	2	61	0	0
Western Canada Concept	0	0	0	9	0
Independent	0	0	0	9	1

== Riding results ==
Names in bold represent cabinet ministers and the Speaker. Party leaders are italicized. The symbol " ** " indicates MLAs who did not run again.

=== Northwest Saskatchewan ===
Electoral District	Candidates			Incumbent
Electoral District	Progressive Conservative	New Democratic	Liberal	Incumbent
Athabasca	Pat Cardinal; 457 (10.70%)	Frederick John Thompson; 2,357 (55.20%)	Jim Durocher; 1,456 (34.10%)	Frederick John Thompson
Cut Knife-Lloydminster	Michael Hopfner; 4,526 (52.32%)	Bob Long; 3,677 (42.50%)	Virginia Fox; 448 (5.18%)	Michael Alfred Hopfner
Meadow Lake	George McLeod; 3,711 (59.42%)	Bill Krasicki; 2,183 (34.96%)	Henry E. Coupland; 351 (5.62%)	George Malcolm McLeod
Redberry	John Gerich; 3,591 (53.91%)	Dennis Banda; 2,791 (41.90%)	Aurele Lalonde; 279 (4.19%)	John Gerich
Rosthern	William Neudorf; 5,700 (57.01%)	Edgar Epp; 3,348 (33.49%)	Allan G. Turberfield; 950 (9.50%)	Ralph Katzman**
The Battlefords	Myles Morin; 4,851 (47.11%)	Doug Anguish; 4,908 (47.66%)	Ken McCaffrey; 539 (5.23%)	Myles L. Morin
Turtleford	Colin Maxwell; 3,403 (50.13%)	Chris Sorenson; 2,968 (43.73%)	Lucien Briere; 417 (6.14%)	Colin Maxwell

=== Northeast Saskatchewan ===
Electoral District	Candidates				Incumbent
Electoral District	Progressive Conservative	New Democratic	Liberal	Other	Incumbent
Cumberland	Larry Wolkosky; 1,416 (27.11%)	Keith Goulet; 3,173 (60.74%)	Robin W. Turner; 436 (8.34%)	Gordon "Popeye" Carle (Ind.); 199 (3.81%)	Lawrence Riel Yew**
Kelsey-Tisdale	Neal Hardy; 4,448 (54.19%)	Mike Martyn; 3,452 (42.05%)	Bill Soloway; 309 (3.76%)		Neal Herbert Hardy
Kinistino	Josef Saxinger; 3,900 (49.11%)	Don Cody; 3,748 (47.20%)	Ray L Manègre; 293 (3.69%)		Bernard Boutin**
Melfort	Grant Hodgins; 4,433 (56.14%)	Keith Davis; 2,963 (37.53%)	Jerry Derkatz; 500 (6.33%)		Grant Hodgins
Nipawin	Lloyd Sauder; 4,312 (55.98%)	Gilda Treleaven; 2,975 (38.62%)	Ron J. Wassill; 416 (5.40%)		Lloyd David Sauder
Prince Albert	John Meagher; 4,039 (37.17%)	Myron Kowalsky; 6,059 (55.76%)	Rupert Baudais; 768 (7.07%)		John Paul Meagher
Prince Albert-Duck Lake	Sid Dutchak; 3,915 (43.55%)	Eldon Lautermilch; 4,448 (49.48%)	Marg Tornquist; 627 (6.97%)		Sid Dutchak
Shellbrook-Torch River	Lloyd Muller; 4,145 (48.96%)	George Bowerman; 3,941 (46.55%)	Ed Olchowy; 380 (4.49%)		Lloyd John Muller

=== West Central Saskatchewan ===
Electoral District	Candidates				Incumbent
Electoral District	Progressive Conservative	New Democratic	Liberal	Other	Incumbent
Arm River	Gerald Muirhead; 4,828 (57.67%)	Bob Robertson; 2,948 (35.21%)	Kim Gleim; 535 (6.39%)	Hilton J. Spencer (WCC); 61 (0.73%)	Gerald Muirhead
Biggar	Harry Baker; 3,882 (50.26%)	Pat Trask; 3,449 (44.65%)	Sharon Hamilton; 393 (5.09%)		Harry Daniel Baker
Humboldt	Louis Domotor; 3,693 (42.30%)	Eric Upshall; 3,914 (44.83%)	Larry Benning; 1,124 (12.87%)		Louis Albert Domotor
Kindersley	Robert Andrew; 4,882 (65.66%)	Wayne Welte; 1,993 (26.81%)	Phillip Johnson; 560 (7.53%)		Robert Lynal Andrew
Rosetown-Elrose	**Herbert Swan**; 4,276 (58.44%)	George Tweedle; 2,530 (34.58%)	James D. McCullough; 414 (5.66%)	Danny Brown (Ind.); 97 (1.32%)	Herbert Junior Swan
Wilkie	John Britton; 3,457 (48.35%)	Ted Zoller; 2,151 (30.09%)	Nick Volk; 1,541 (21.56%)		James William Arthur Garner**

=== East Central Saskatchewan ===
Electoral District	Candidates				Incumbent
Electoral District	Progressive Conservative	New Democratic	Liberal	Other	Incumbent
Canora	Lorne Kopelchuk; 4,273 (54.65%)	Linda Kezima; 3,271 (41.83%)	Carole Merriman; 275 (3.52%)		Lloyd Hampton**
Kelvington-Wadena	Sherwin Petersen; 4,129 (50.97%)	Ken Folstad; 3,565 (44.01%)	Orvall Enge; 407 (5.02%)		Sherwin Petersen
Last Mountain-Touchwood	**Arnold Tusa**; 4,032 (47.69%)	Gordon MacMurchy; 3,943 (46.63%)	Charles Schuler; 480 (5.68%)		Arnold Tusa
Melville	Grant Schmidt; 4,575 (53.46%)	Matt Stecyk; 3,302 (38.59%)	Mona Kines; 643 (7.51%)	Arthur J. Pelzer (Alliance); 38 (0.44%)	Grant Schmidt
Pelly	Rod Gardner; 3,280 (49.47%)	Norm Lusney; 3,113 (46.95%)	A. Ben Ferrie; 237 (3.58%)		Norm Lusney
Quill Lakes	Mervin Sigstad; 3,405 (42.90%)	Murray Koskie; 4,031 (50.78%)	Pat Morrison; 502 (6.32%)		Murray Koskie
Saltcoats	Walt Johnson; 3,612 (47.47%)	Reg Knezacek; 3,549 (46.64%)	Leslie Popp; 448 (5.89%)		Walter Robert Johnson
Yorkton	Lorne McLaren; 4,408 (47.08%)	Gordon Roberts; 4,189 (44.74%)	Susan Holmberg; 664 (7.09%)	Ernest R. Lee (Alliance); 102 (1.09%)	Lorne A. McLaren

=== Southwest Saskatchewan ===
Electoral District	Candidates					Incumbent
Electoral District	Progressive Conservative	New Democratic	Liberal	Western Canada Concept	Other	Incumbent
Assiniboia-Gravelbourg	Bill Fancourt; 2,273 (28.72%)	Allen Engel; 2,395 (30.26%)	Ralph Goodale; 3,246 (41.02%)			Allen Engel
Maple Creek	Joan Duncan; 4,199 (60.87%)	Barry Elderkin; 2,185 (31.68%)	Harold Pawlitza; 514 (7.45%)			Joan Duncan
Moose Jaw North	Keith Parker; 4,273 (40.06%)	Glenn Hagel; 5,370 (50.35%)	Tim Crosbie; 970 (9.09%)	Nick Dowhy Jr. 33 (0.31%)	Clifford H. Hume (Alliance); 20 (0.19%)	Keith Edward Parker
Moose Jaw South	Arthur "Bud" Smith; 2,823 (33.27%)	Lorne Calvert; 4,959 (58.45%)	Irene McKenzie; 653 (7.70%)	Phoebe Dowhy; 49 (0.58%)		Arthur "Bud" Smith
Morse	Art Martens; 3,694 (56.12%)	Reg Gross; 2,209 (33.56%)	Al Harder; 605 (9.19%)	Burton Rempel; 74 (1.13%)		Harold Martens
Shaunavon	Ted Gleim; 3,311 (47.70%)	Dwain Lingenfelter; 2,968 (42.76%)	Jules Larochelle; 662 (9.54%)			Dwain Lingenfelter
Swift Current	Patricia Anne Smith; 4,444 (50.71%)	John Penner; 3,785 (43.19%)	Archie Green; 486 (5.54%)	Orland McInnes; 49 (0.56%)		Patricia Anne Smith
Thunder Creek	Richard Swenson; 3,773 (53.52%)	Betty Payne; 1,864 (26.44%)	William Johnstone; 1,375 (19.50%)	Robert Gleim; 38 (0.54%)		Richard Swenson

December 15, 1988 By-election: Assiniboia-Gravelbourg
Party	Candidate	Votes	%	±%
Prog. Conservative	John Thomas Wolfe	3,164	44.31	+15.59
NDP	Allen Engel	3,009	42.14	+11.88
Liberal	Daryl Beatty	966	13.53	-27.48
Total		7,139	100.00	

=== Southeast Saskatchewan ===
Electoral District	Candidates				Incumbent
Electoral District	Progressive Conservative	New Democratic	Liberal	Western Canada Concept	Incumbent
Bengough-Milestone	Bob Pickering; 3,740 (54.50%)	Jim Liggett; 2,406 (35.06%)	Brent Knudsen; 716 (10.44%)		Robert Hugh Pickering
Estevan	**Grant Devine**; 6,037 (63.43%)	Dan Tangjerd; 2,766 (29.06%)	Leonard Ludwig; 655 (6.88%)	Randy Shaver; 60 (0.63%)	Grant Devine
Indian Head-Wolseley	Doug Taylor; 3,976 (57.82%)	Joe Zaba; 1,794 (26.09%)	Donald E. Gabel; 1,106 (16.09%)		Douglas Graham Taylor
Moosomin	Don Toth; 4,622 (60.22%)	William Sauter; 2,429 (31.65%)	Myles Fuchs; 624 (8.13%)		Larry Birkbeck**
Qu’Appelle-Lumsden	John Gary Lane; 4,490 (47.55%)	Suzanne Murray; 3,763 (39.86%)	Linda Boxall; 1,150 (12.18%)	Joey Gargol; 39 (0.41%)	John Gary Lane
Souris-Cannington	Eric Berntson; 4,642 (67.70%)	Charlotte Rasmussen; 1,529 (22.30%)	William H. Ireland; 686 (10.00%)		Eric Berntson
Weyburn	Lorne Hepworth; 4,596 (52.65%)	Harry-Jae Elder; 3,220 (36.88%)	Bill Rudachyk; 859 (9.84%)	Edwin W. Appenheimer; 55 (0.63%)	Lorne Henry Hepworth

=== Saskatoon ===
Electoral District	Candidates				Incumbent
Electoral District	Progressive Conservative	New Democratic	Liberal	Other	Incumbent
Saskatoon Centre	Jack Sandberg; 2,755 (35.55%)	Anne deBlois Smart; 3,854 (49.74%)	Audrey Brent; 1,119 (14.44%)	Norm Baker (Alliance); 21 (0.27%)	Jack Sven Sandberg
Saskatoon Eastview	Pierre Martineau; 6,356 (43.08%)	Dixie Campbell-Tymchatyn; 5,745 (38.94%)	Vic Karwacki; 2,653 (17.98%)		Kimberly Young**
Saskatoon Fairview	Ross G. McQuarrie; 3,368 (31.15%)	Bob Mitchell; 6,539 (60.47%)	Al Cebryk; 906 (8.38%)		Duane Weiman**
Saskatoon Mayfair	Ray Meiklejohn; 7,725 (45.53%)	Gord Gunoff; 7,431 (43.80%)	Denis I. Quon; 1,748 (10.30%)	Robert Bonsor (Ind.); 62 (0.37%)	Cal Glauser**
Saskatoon Nutana	Mervyn Houghton; 2,439 (30.77%)	Pat Atkinson; 4,719 (59.52%)	Eugene V.J. Pulak; 770 (9.71%)		Evelyn Bacon**
Saskatoon Riversdale	Jo-Ann Zazelenchuk; 2,114 (26.39%)	Roy Romanow; 5,490 (68.52%)	Bernadine Droesse; 408 (5.09%)		Jo-Ann Zazelenchuk
Saskatoon South	Bob Myers; 3,311 (40.09%)	Herman Rolfes; 3,735 (45.23%)	Bernie Yuzdepski; 1,212 (14.68%)		Robert Edward William Myers
Saskatoon Sutherland	Paul Schoenhals; 4,520 (40.98%)	Mark Koenker; 5,210 (47.23%)	George Rathgeber; 1,300 (11.79%)		Paul John Schoenhals
Saskatoon University	Rick Folk; 2,744 (35.81%)	Peter Prebble; 3,400 (44.38%)	Robert G. Crowe; 1,518 (19.81%)		Rick Folk
Saskatoon Westmount	Gay Caswell; 1,990 (27.06%)	John Edward Brockelbank; 4,770 (64.87%)	Bill Purdy; 593 (8.07%)		Gay Caswell

May 4, 1988 By-election: Saskatoon Eastview
Party	Candidate	Votes	%	±%
NDP	Bob Pringle	6,685	53.53	+14.59
Prog. Conservative	Toni Davidson	3,330	26.67	-16.41
Liberal	Pat Beck	2,473	19.80	+1.82
Total		12,488	100.00	

=== Regina ===
Electoral District	Candidates				Incumbent
Electoral District	Progressive Conservative	New Democratic	Liberal	Other	Incumbent
Regina Centre	Roy Wellman; 2,088 (26.59%)	Ned Shillington; 4,737 (60.34%)	Ed Nordhagen; 953 (12.14%)	Kimball Cariou (Communist); 73 (0.93%)	Edward Shillington
Regina Elphinstone	Al Empringham; 1,678 (22.50%)	Allan Blakeney; 5,288 (70.90%)	Don McGregor; 492 (6.60%)		Allan Blakeney
Regina Lakeview	Tim Embury; 2,989 (33.93%)	Louise Simard; 4,185 (47.52%)	June L. Blau; 1,634 (18.55%)		Tim Embury
Regina North	Ken Skilnick; 3,109 (30.38%)	Kim Trew; 6,008 (58.72%)	Tom Townsend; 1,098 (10.73%)	Ian Bruce Clarke (Alliance) 17 (0.17%)	Jack Klein
Regina North East	Noel Klock; 2,962 (27.70%)	Edwin Tchorzewski; 6,845 (64.03%)	Paul Thériault; 884 (8.27%)		Edwin Tchorzewski
Regina North West	Alvin Law; 4,517 (33.02%)	John Solomon; 7,970 (58.27%)	John MacGowan; 1,152 (8.42%)	Bill Sveinson (Alliance) 39 (0.29%)	Bill Sveinson
Regina Rosemont	Gordon Dirks; 3,828 (36.82%)	Robert Lyons; 5,805 (55.84%)	Christine Crowther; 763 (7.34%)		Gordon Dirks
Regina South	Jack Klein; 4,115 (44.98%)	Margaret Fern; 3,462 (37.84%)	Kevin Moore; 1,572 (17.18%)		Paul Rousseau**
Regina Victoria	Metro Rybchuk; 2,128 (26.35%)	Harry Van Mulligen; 4,782 (59.23%)	Alvey Halbgewachs; 1,164 (14.42%)		Metro Rybchuk
Regina Wascana	Gordon Martin; 5,176 (41.75%)	Bob Goos; 5,121 (41.30%)	Cam McCannell; 2,101 (16.95%)		Gord Currie**

May 4, 1988 By-election: Regina Elphinstone
Party	Candidate	Votes	%	±%
NDP	Dwain Lingenfelter	4,309	77.33	+6.43
Prog. Conservative	Myrna Petersen	694	12.46	-10.04
Liberal	Ron Eistetter	569	10.21	+3.61
Total		5,572	100.00	

== See also ==
- List of political parties in Saskatchewan
- List of Saskatchewan provincial electoral districts
