= Adelaide/Churchill, Saskatoon =

Adelaide/Churchill
- Neighbourhood
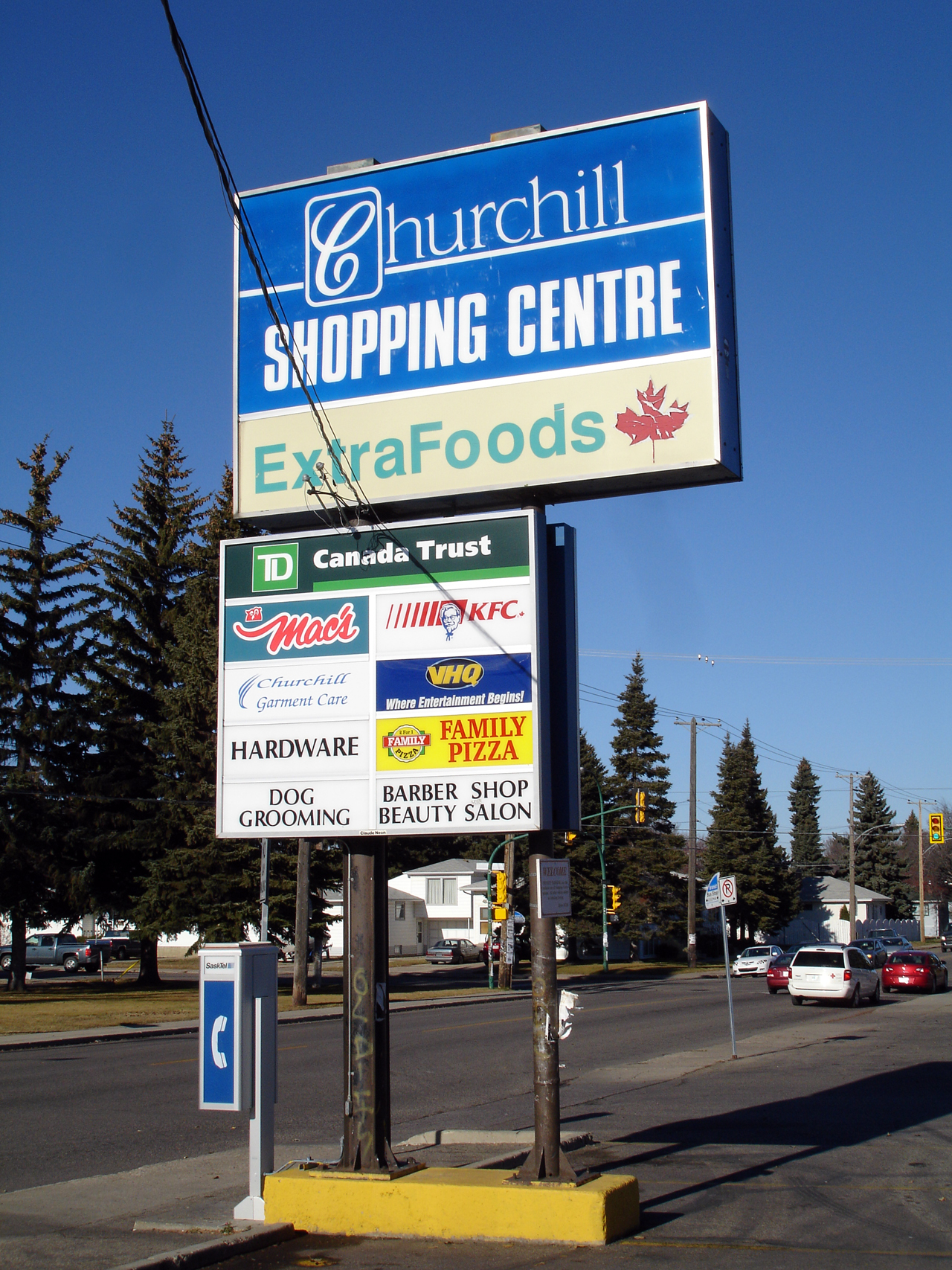
- Churchill Shopping Centre

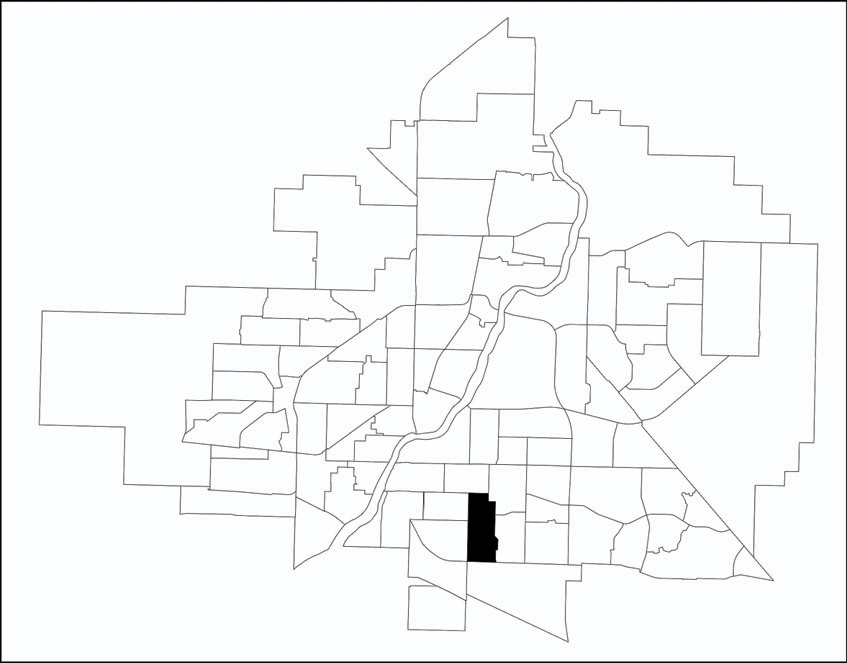
- Adelaide/Churchill location map
- Coordinates: 52°5′55″N 106°38′27″W
- Country: Canada
- Province: Saskatchewan
- City: Saskatoon
- Suburban Development Area: Nutana
- Neighbourhood: Adelaide/Churchill
- Annexed: 1910-1919
- Construction: 1946-1960

Government
  - Type: Municipal (Ward 7)
  - Administrative body: Saskatoon City Council
  - Councillor: Mairin Loewen

Area
  - Total: 1.5 km^{2} (0.58 sq mi)

Population (2009)
  - Total: 3,445
  - Average Income: $78,438
- Time zone: UTC-6 (UTC)
- Website: Adelaide/Churchill Community Association

Adelaide/Churchill is a mostly residential neighbourhood located in south-central Saskatoon, Saskatchewan, Canada. It is a suburban subdivision, consisting mostly of low-density, single detached dwellings. As of 2009, the area is home to 3,445 residents. The neighbourhood is considered a middle-income area, with an average family income of $78,438, an average dwelling value of $287,976 and a home ownership rate of 90.3%.

== History ==
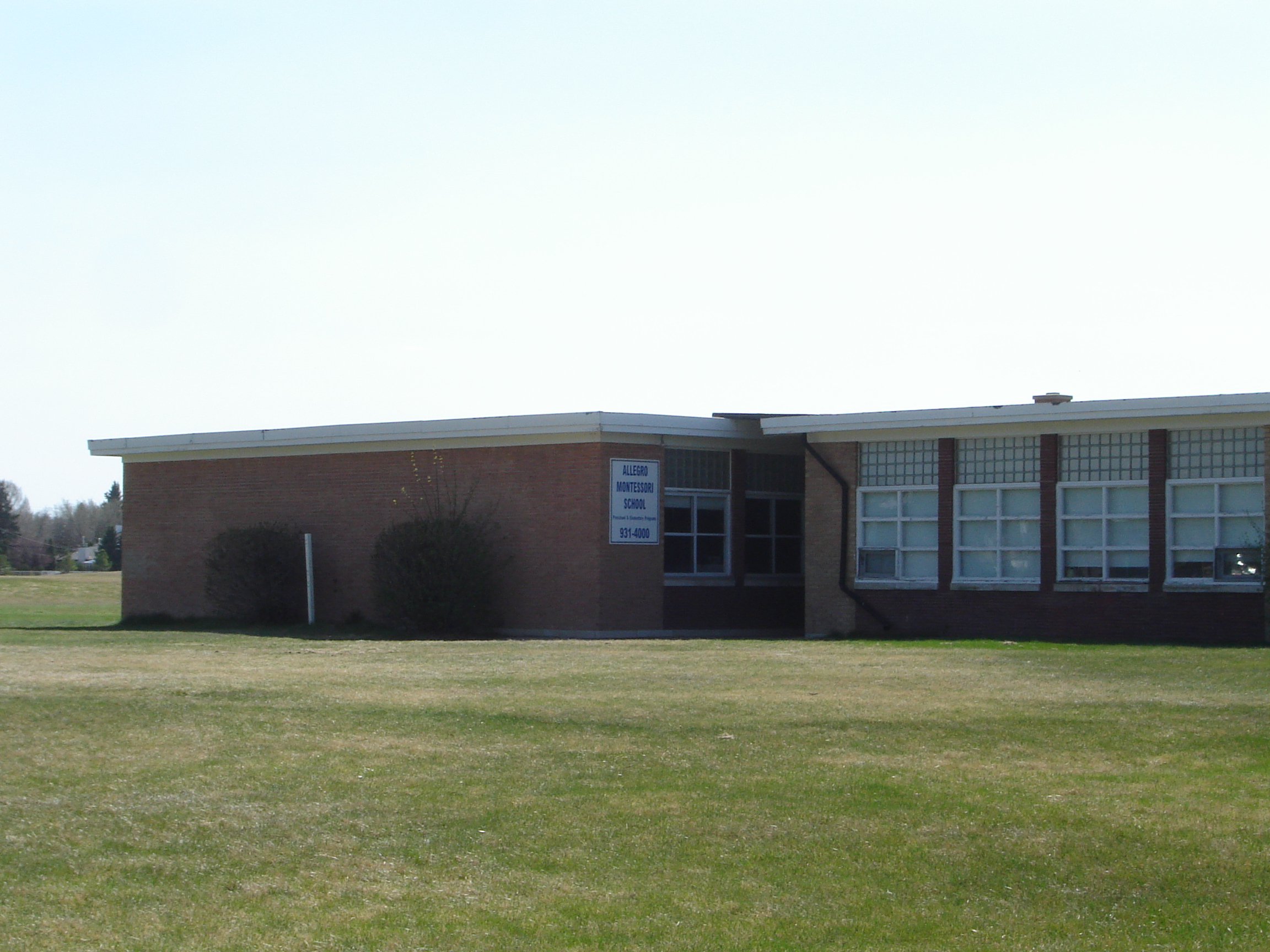
Saskatoon Full Gospel Church, formerly Churchill School

Most of the land for the Adelaide/Churchill neighbourhood was annexed by the city between 1910 and 1919, with the remaining southern piece annexed between 1960 and 1969. According to a 1913 map of registered subdivisions, the area was divided in two: Victoria Park to the north of Ruth Street and Park Adelaide to the south. The two were developed as Churchill (north) and Adelaide Park (south) - with Ruth Street as the dividing line - but were combined into a single neighbourhood when the city redrew its neighbourhood boundaries in the 1990s. The layout of the streets reflects the urban planning philosophies of the day when the land was developed. The north part of the neighbourhood, developed just after World War II, follows a traditional grid pattern. By the 1950s, the design of residential neighbourhoods used a modern system of curving residential streets, feeding into collector roads that connected to arterial roads. Thus, the southern part of the neighbourhood follows this design practice. Until the mid-1950s several north-south avenues were numbered in an attempt to continue the numbering from the west side of the river; this proved confusing so after 1954 the numbered avenues were assigned names (e.g., 12th Avenue was renamed Cairns Avenue).

Churchill School was built in 1956, but served as a public school for just under thirty years before closing. Hugh Cairns V.C. School was opened in 1960. It was named after Hugh Cairns (VC), a Canadian soldier from World War I whose hometown was Saskatoon. He was posthumously awarded the Victoria Cross, the British Commonwealth's highest award for bravery in battle. Coincidentally, the school is located on Cairns Avenue; however the street was actually named for local pioneer John Cairns, not the soldier.

A divisive debate occurred in 2008 when the Saskatoon Full Gospel Church, owners of the former Churchill School, sought approval to demolish the structure and build a new church and attached condominium complex. Area residents complained that the new building would increase traffic on residential streets, and clash with the existing character of the neighbourhood. Ultimately, city council approved the project and it was under construction as of 2013.

Build-out of the neighbourhood was mostly complete by the mid-1970s when work was completed on a series of residential crescents south of Wilson Cres., however some additional development in the late 1980s saw Calder Avenue in the neighborhood's southwest corner extended south of a back lane, with three cul-de-sac streets and a crescent that extended to Clarence Avenue. In addition, construction of an interchange at Clarence Avenue and Circle Drive, in the planning stages since the 1960s, was completed in the late 2000s, facilitating resident access to the freeway and to the major commercial development at Stonebridge. Cumberland Avenue, which forms the eastern boundary of the community, was originally planned to connect with Circle Drive, but ultimately the city chose not to do this, leaving Clarence the only street that directly connects to the freeway from Adelaide/Churchill.

In 2017, construction began on a new fire station on Clarence Avenue South, just north of St. Martin's Church and Wilson Crescent. The station, which opened in 2018, replaced an older station in the Queen Elizabeth community to the northwest; it was relocated to Adelaide/Churchill in order to allow it to also serve Stonebridge to the south.

== Government and politics ==
Adelaide/Churchill exists within the federal electoral district of Saskatoon—Grasswood. It is currently represented by Kevin Waugh of the Conservative Party of Canada, first elected in 2015.

Provincially, the area is mostly within the boundaries of Saskatoon Eastview. It was represented by Corey Tochor of the Saskatchewan Party, from 2011 until 2020, when Matt Love of the Saskatchewan New Democratic Party was elected. A small portion of the neighborhood north of Isabella Street is within the boundaries of Saskatoon Churchill-Wildwood.

In Saskatoon's non-partisan municipal politics, Adelaide/Churchill lies within ward 7. It is currently represented by Councillor Mairin Loewen, who was elected to city council in a 2011 by-election.

== Institutions ==
=== Education ===
Hugh Cairns V. C. School
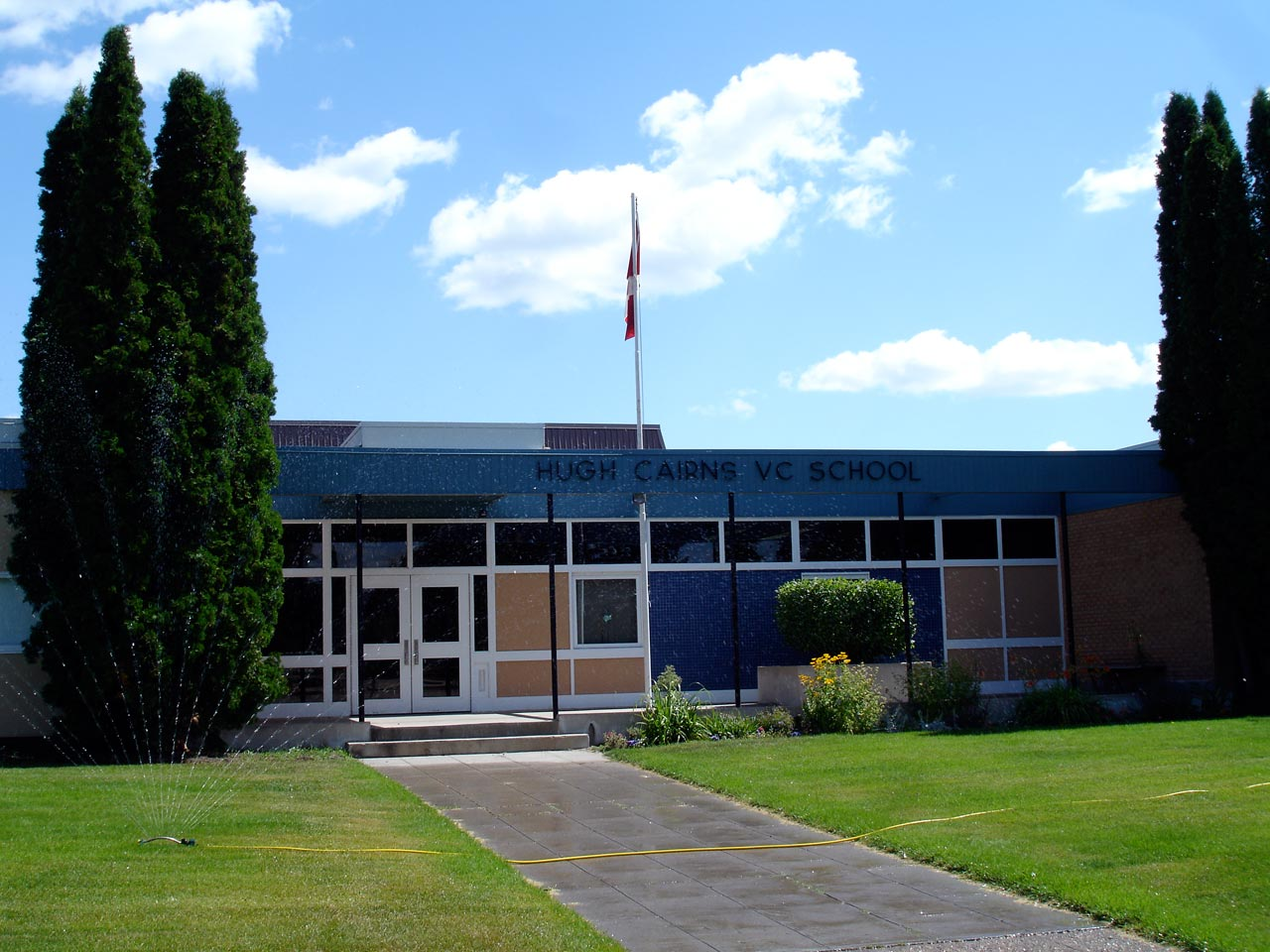

Location
- 2621 Cairns Avenue; Saskatoon, Saskatchewan, S7J 1V8; Canada

Information
- Type: Elementary
- Opened: 1959
- School board: Saskatoon Public School Division
- Superintendent: Paul Janzen
- Area trustee: Ross Tait
- Principal: Ian Wilson
- Vice Principal: Corey Apesland
- Grades: Kindergarten to Grade 8
- Enrollment: 241 (2017)
- Education system: Public
- Language: English
- Slogan: Soaring ever higher!
- Feeder to: Aden Bowman Collegiate
- Website: Hugh Cairns V. C. School

St. Philip School
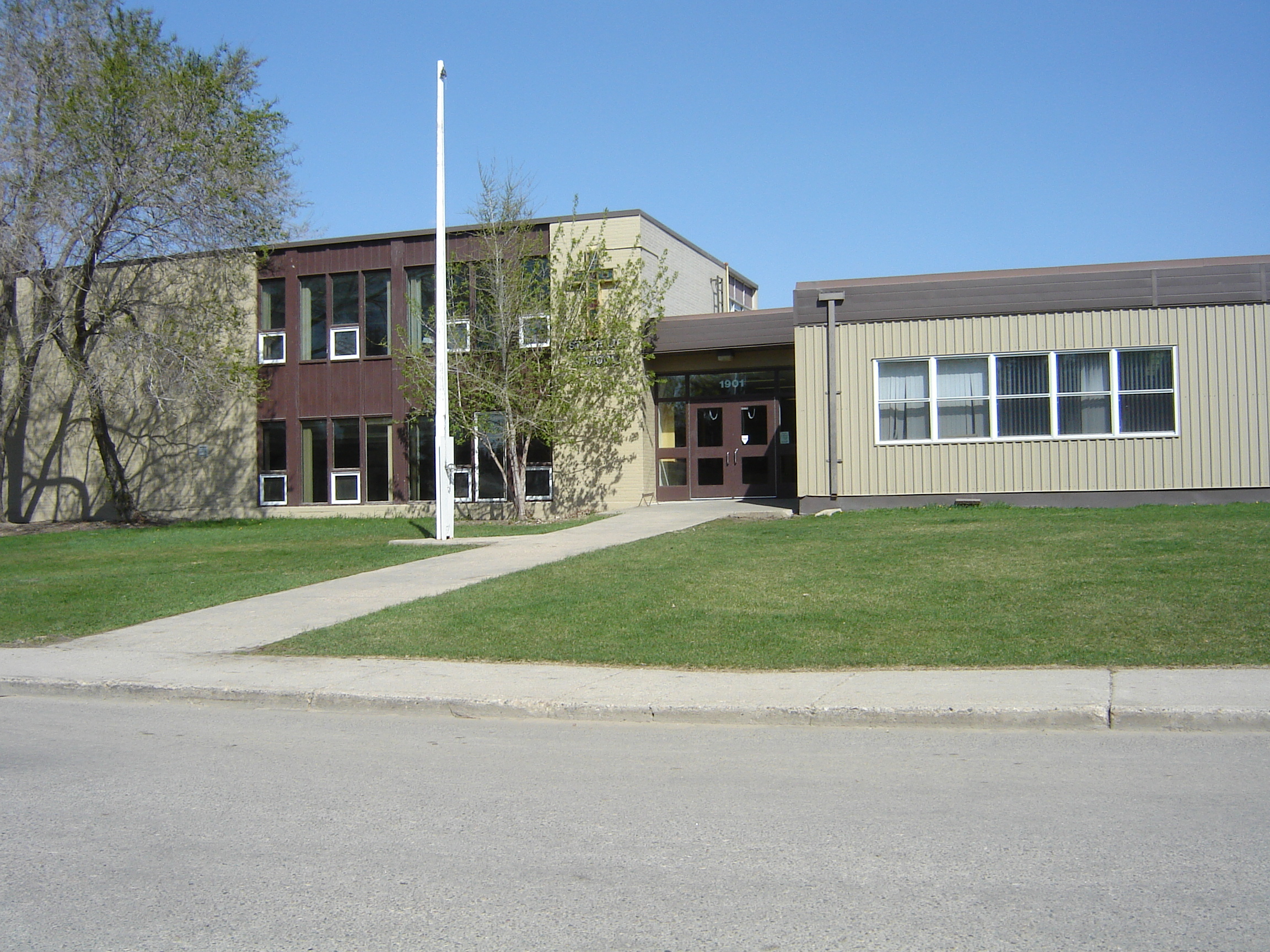

Location
- 1901 Haultain Avenue; Saskatoon, Saskatchewan, S7J 1P4; Canada

Information
- Type: Elementary
- Religious affiliation: Catholic
- Opened: 1956
- School board: Greater Saskatoon Catholic Schools
- Principal: Lisa Domoslai
- Grades: Kindergarten to Grade 8
- Enrollment: 228 (2017)
- Education system: Separate
- Language: English
- Feeder to: Holy Cross High School
- Website: St. Philip School

- Hugh Cairns V. C. School - public elementary, part of the Saskatoon Public School Division. The school was constructed in 1959 and took in its first students in 1960. Although located on Cairns Avenue, the school and the street are not named for the same person; the school is named for Saskatonian Hugh Cairns, who was awarded the Victoria Cross for his actions during World War I, while the street is named for Alderman John Cairns and was actually called 12th Avenue until 1954.
- St. Philip School - separate (Catholic) elementary, part of Greater Saskatoon Catholic Schools. It was established in 1956.
- Churchill School was a public elementary school constructed in 1956 and closed in the early 1980s, before being sold to the Saskatoon Full Gospel Church on July 1, 1985. The original school building at Ruth Street and Haultain Avenue has since been demolished and replaced by new construction, while the remainder of its school yard is taken up by the Churchill Gardens condominium complex.

In addition, Aden Bowman Collegiate (a grade 9-12 high school) is located across the street from the neighbourhood's northwest corner, though many students living in Adelaide/Churchill attend the 9-12 high school Walter Murray Collegiate in Nutana Suburban Centre. The nearest Catholic/Separate high school is Holy Cross High School, located east of Walter Murray. In addition, several schools in the neighbouring Avalon and Nutana Park communities lie within only a couple of blocks of the community boundary.

== Parks and recreation ==
- Meadowlark Park (3.1 acres)
- Adelaide Park (5.2 acres)
- Churchill Park (13.4 acres)

The Adelaide/Churchill Community Association exists to represent the educational, recreational, and social needs of residents, to promote a sense of community and enhance quality of life in the area.

== Commercial ==
Commercial development is limited to the northwest corner of the neighbourhood, where the Churchill Shopping Centre sits on the corner of Clarence Avenue and Taylor Street. This strip mall, which opened in December 1957, has the distinction of being the oldest shopping centre in Saskatoon. Through its history, the strip mall has featured a neighbourhood grocery store, along with an evolving mix of retail including a convenience store that is heavily used by the students from the high school directly across the street.

In addition, there are 57 home-based businesses in the neighbourhood. The community is immediately north of the big box commercial development in Stonebridge and is also served by the enclosed shopping centre Market Mall to the east. The Avalon Shopping Centre, a strip mall located in the Avalon neighbourhood to the west, has also serviced residents of the former Adelaide Park community since 1957.

== Location ==
Adelaide/Churchill is located within the Nutana Suburban Development Area. It is bounded by Taylor Street to the north, Circle Drive to the south, Cumberland Avenue to the east, and Clarence Avenue to the west. Roads are laid in a grid fashion in the majority of the neighbourhood, while the area south of Wilson Crescent is made up primarily of crescents.

== See also ==
- Royal eponyms in Canada
