= Nutana Park, Saskatoon =

Nutana Park
- Neighbourhood
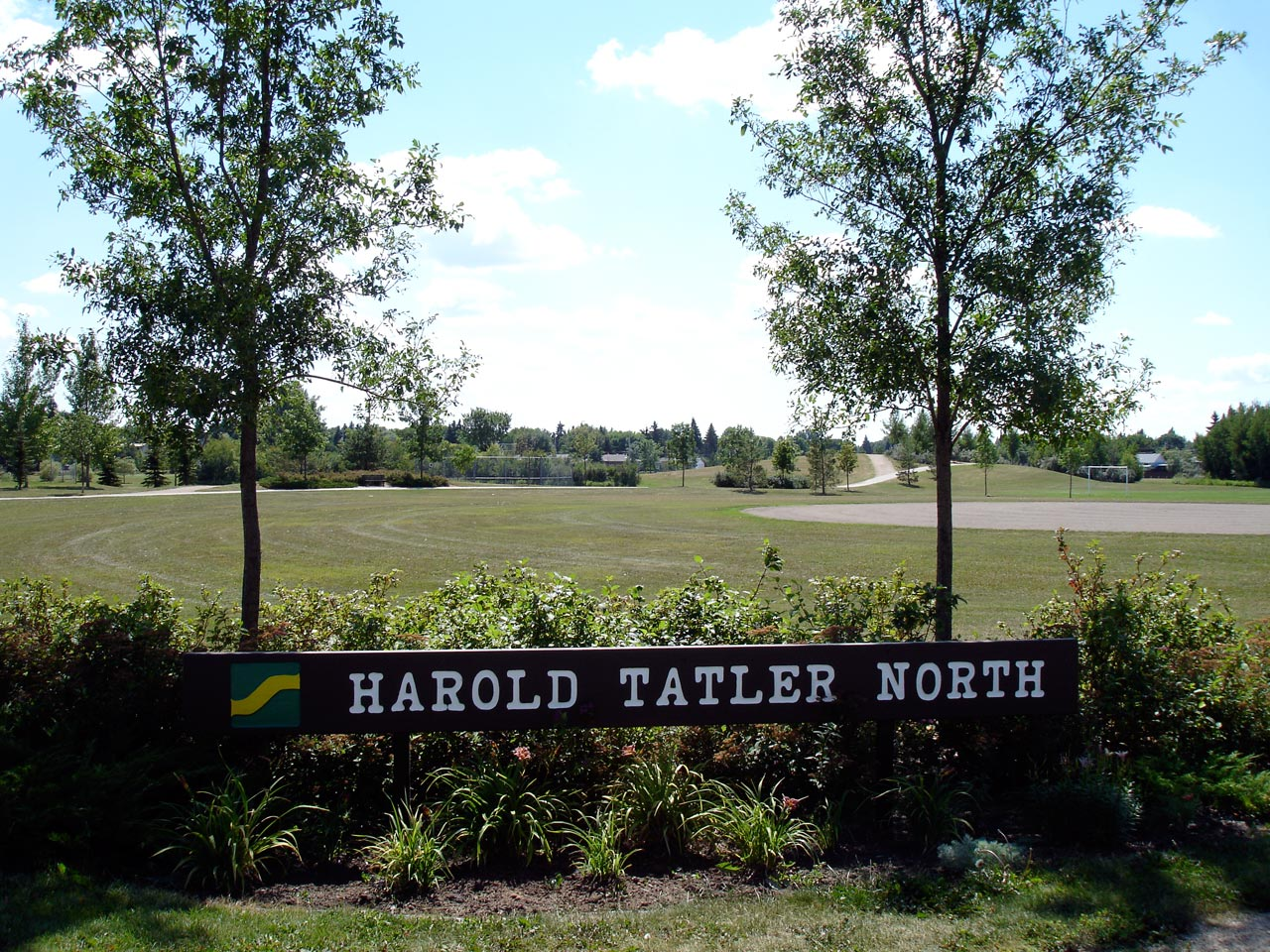
- Harold Tatler Park North

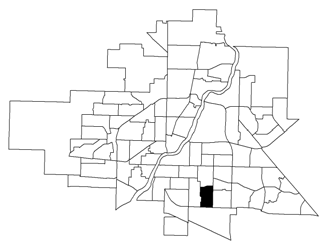
- Nutana Park location map
- Coordinates: 52°5′46″N 106°37′41″W
- Country: Canada
- Province: Saskatchewan
- City: Saskatoon
- Suburban Development Area: Nutana
- Neighbourhood: Nutana Park
- Annexed: 1910-1919
- Construction: 1946-1960

Government
  - Type: Municipal (Ward 9)
  - Administrative body: Saskatoon City Council
  - Councillor: Bev Dubois
  - MLA (Saskatoon Eastview): Matt Love, NDP
  - MP (Saskatoon—Grasswood): Kevin Waugh CP

Area
  - Total: 1.17 km^{2} (0.45 sq mi)

Population (2021)
  - Total: 2,959
  - Average Income: $42,630
- Time zone: UTC-6 (UTC)
- Website: South Nutana Park Community Association

Nutana Park (sometimes referred to as South Nutana Park) is a mostly residential neighbourhood located in south-central Saskatoon, Saskatchewan, Canada. It is a suburban subdivision, consisting mostly of low-density, single detached dwellings. As of 2021, the area is home to 2,959 residents. The neighbourhood is considered a middle-income area, with an average personal income of $42,630 and a home ownership rate of 83.3%. According to MLS data, the average sale price of a home as of 2020 was $346,929.

== History ==
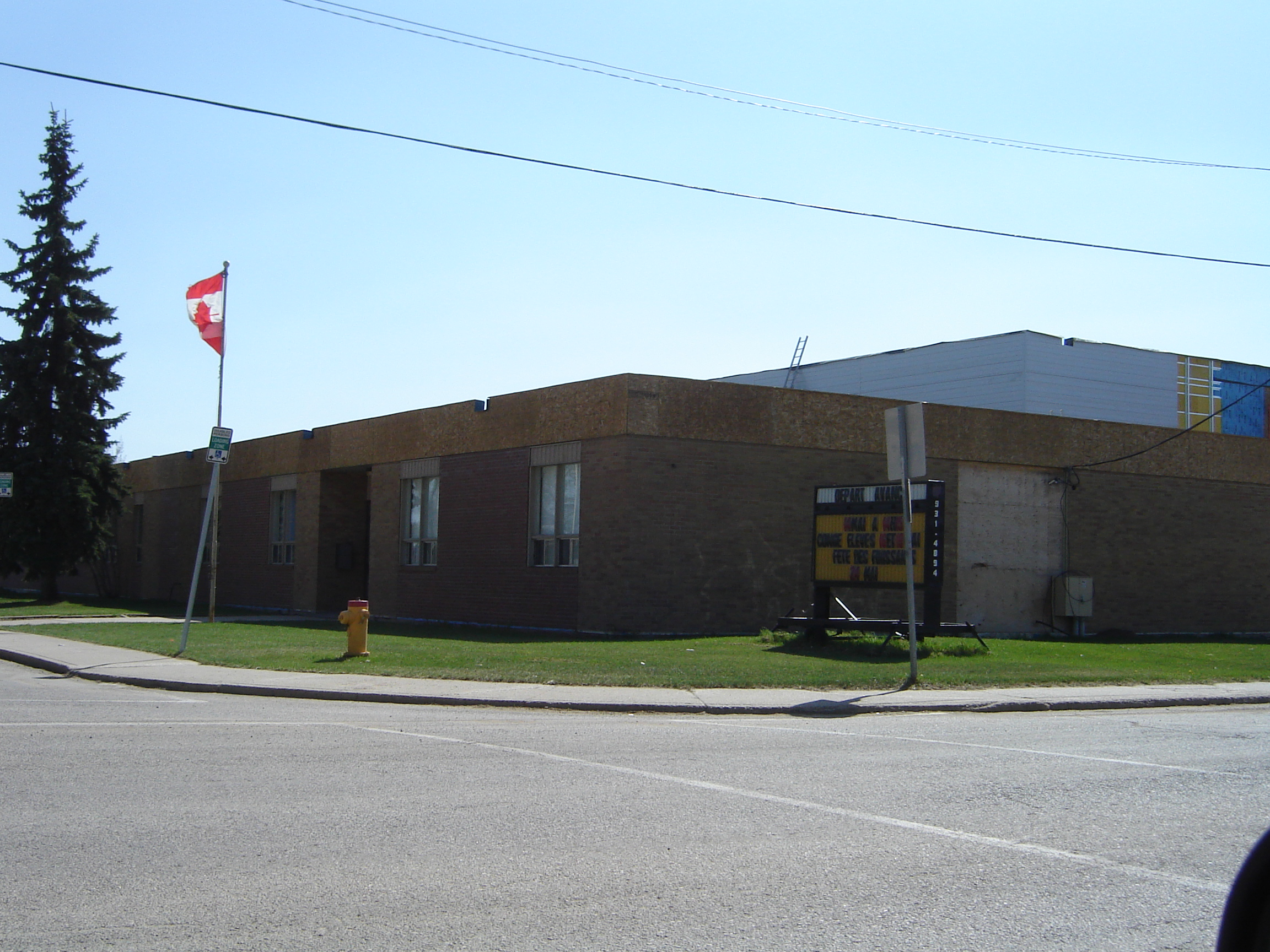
L'École canadienne-française (former St. James School)

Most of the land for the Nutana Park neighbourhood was annexed by the city between 1910 and 1919, with the remaining southern piece annexed between 1960 and 1969. According to a 1913 map of registered subdivisions, the name "Nutana Park" was one of many developments in the area, the rest of which went unbuilt. Some of the other subdivisions included University Park, Nutana View, Sterling Park, Alta Vista and Hampton Park. Home building began in the area after World War II, with the greatest activity between 1961 and 1970. The majority of residential units are single-family detached houses, with a small number of semi-detached and apartment units.

The area was once served by two elementary schools under the Saskatoon Public Schools. Prince Philip School began construction in 1959 and opened in 1960. Another public elementary school, Lorne Haselton School, opened in 1961 but closed in 1985 and later occupied (1988) by Saskatchewan Abilities Council. The school was named in honour of Dr. L. D. Haselton, a longtime school dentist and board member.

St. James Elementary School served the neighbourhood until 2005, when it was closed due to declining enrolment. One notable alumnus of the school is Mike Babcock, current NHL head coach of the Toronto Maple Leafs. After St. James' closure, the francophone École canadienne-française Pavillon Gustave-Dubois took over the building; it is Saskatoon's only francophone high school. Extensive renovations to the building were completed in 2008.

== Government and politics ==
Nutana Park exists within the federal electoral district of Saskatoon—Grasswood. It is currently represented by Kevin Waugh of the Conservative Party of Canada, first elected in 2015.

Provincially, Nutana Park is mostly within the boundaries of Saskatoon Eastview. It is currently represented by Matt Love of the Saskatchewan New Democratic Party, elected in 2020. A small portion of the neighborhood north-east of Louise Avenue is within the boundaries of Saskatoon Churchill-Wildwood.

In Saskatoon's non-partisan municipal politics, Nutana Park lies within ward 9. It is currently represented by Councillor Bev Dubois, who was elected to city council in 2016. In June 2023, it was announced that after the completion of public consultation, Nutana Park would be moved from ward 7 to ward 9 for population variance among the 10 wards in the city.

== Institutions ==
=== Education ===
Prince Philip School
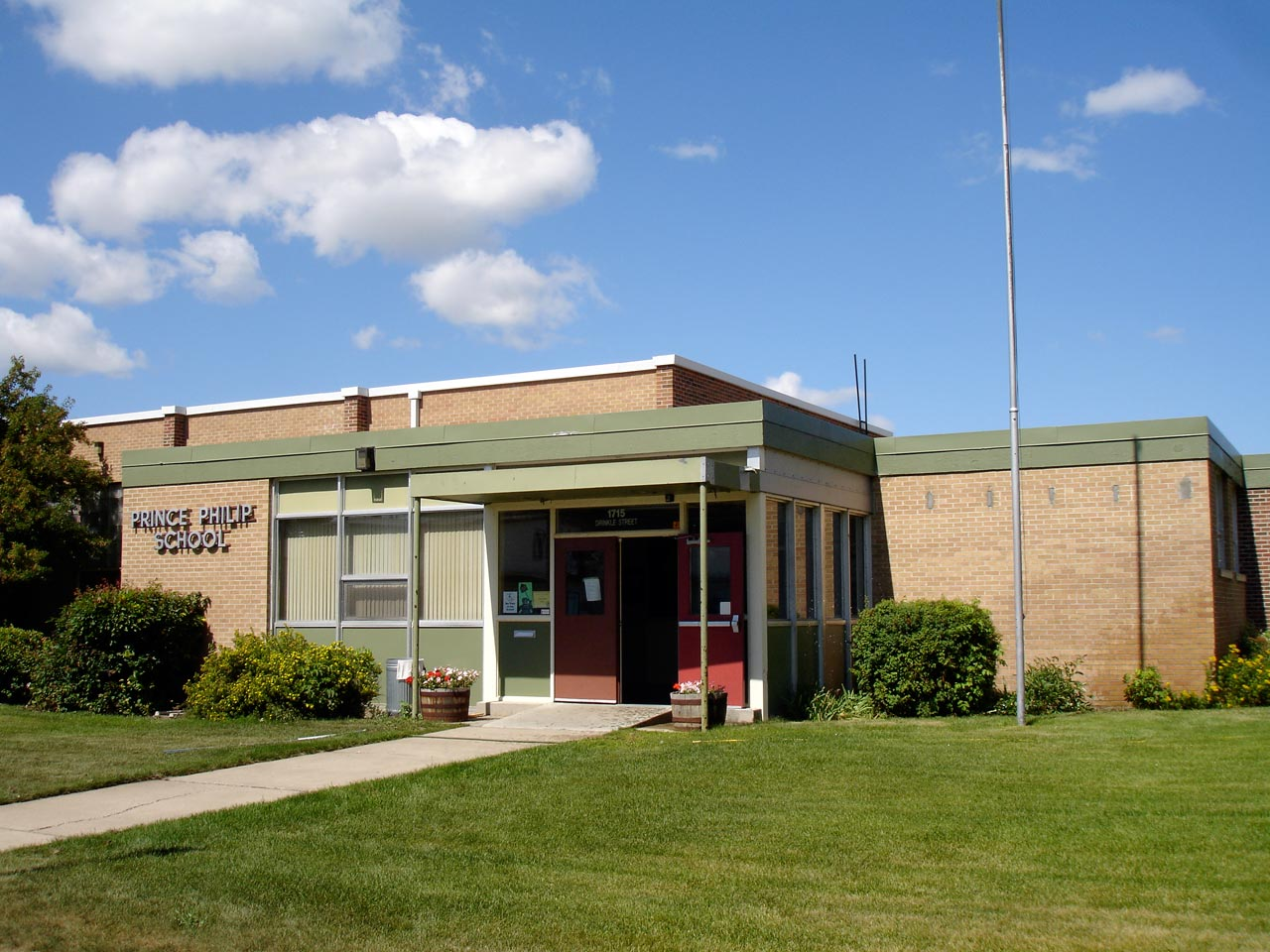
- 1715 Drinkle Street; Saskatoon, Saskatchewan, S7J 0P8; Canada

Information
- Type: Elementary
- Opened: 1960
- School board: Saskatoon Public Schools
- Principal: Shanna Strueby
- Grades: Kindergarten to Grade 8
- Enrollment: 202 (2017)
- Education system: Public
- Language: English
- Feeder to: Walter Murray Collegiate
- Website: Prince Philip School

- Prince Philip School - public elementary school, part of the Saskatoon Public School Division.
- L’École canadienne-française - francophone secondary school, located in the former St. James School.

=== Other ===
- Saskatchewan Abilities Council - vocational, rehabilitation and recreational services for physically and mentally disabled persons. Located in the former Lorne Haselton School.

== Parks and recreation ==
- Harold Tatler Park North - 21.5 acres (8.7 ha)
- Harold Tatler Park South - 9.2 acres (3.7 ha)

Both parks were named after Harold Tatler, a member of the city's Parks Board for many years, and credited with developing many of Saskatoon's boulevards and setting aside adequate park areas.

The Nutana Park Community Association exists to coordinate recreational, sports, and social activities, encourage a sense of community and act as a liaison with the City on a number of issues affecting the neighbourhood.

== Commercial ==
Commercial development is limited to a few small businesses on the corner of Drinkle Street and Estey Drive. In addition, there are 37 home-based businesses in the neighbourhood. Market Mall, a major indoor shopping centre, is located just outside the community boundaries across Preston Avenue, while additional "big box" and strip-mall commercial development has emerged off Preston in the Stonebridge community immediately to the south.

== Location ==
Nutana Park is located within the Nutana Suburban Development Area. It is bounded by Adelaide Street to the north, Circle Drive to the south, Cumberland Avenue to the west, and Preston Avenue to the east. Roads are a mix of local and collector roads. Construction of an interchange at Preston and Circle, in the planning since the 1960s, was completed in the fall 2013.
