= Queen Elizabeth, Saskatoon =

Queen Elizabeth
- Neighbourhood
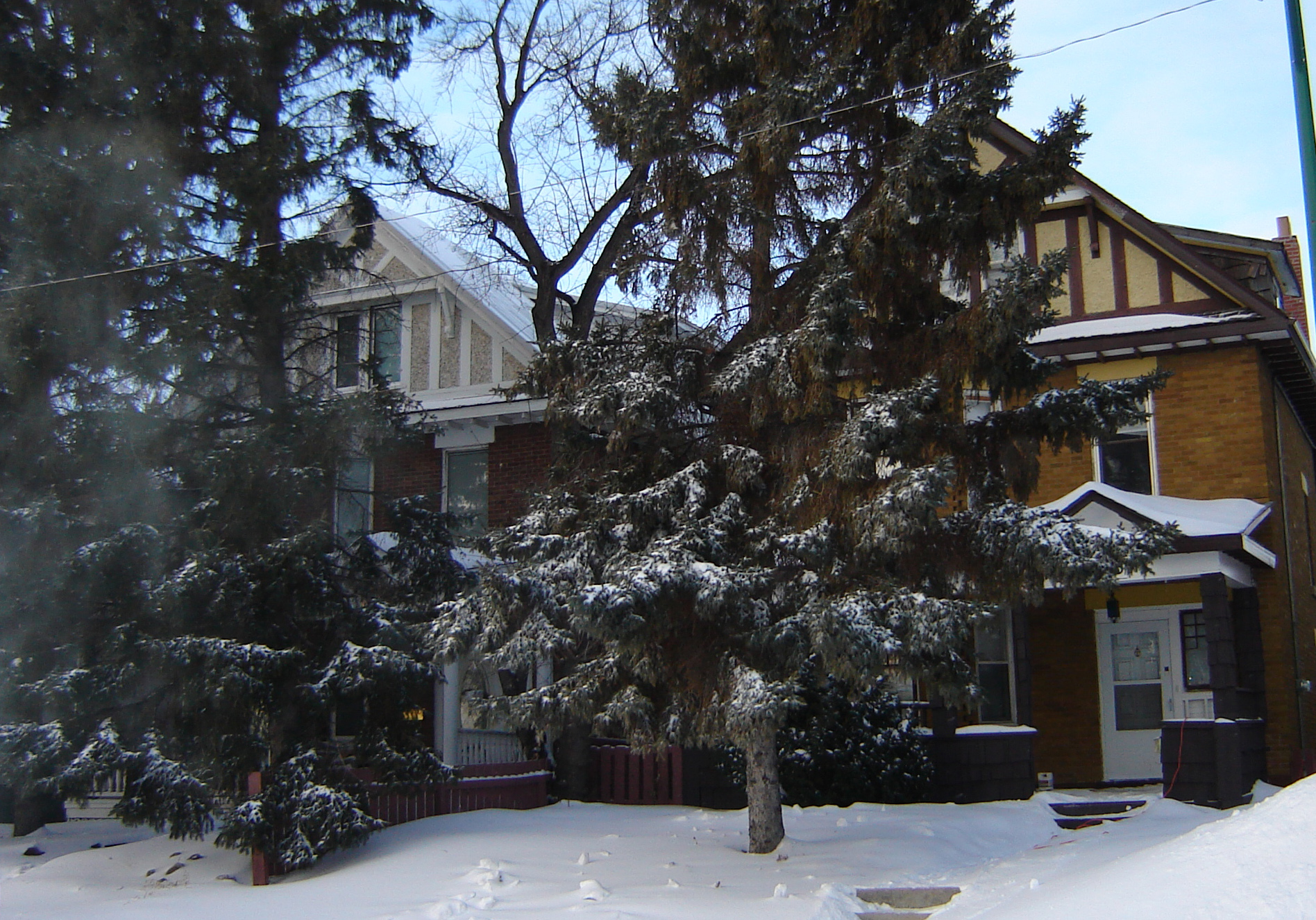
- Two Sisters historic houses

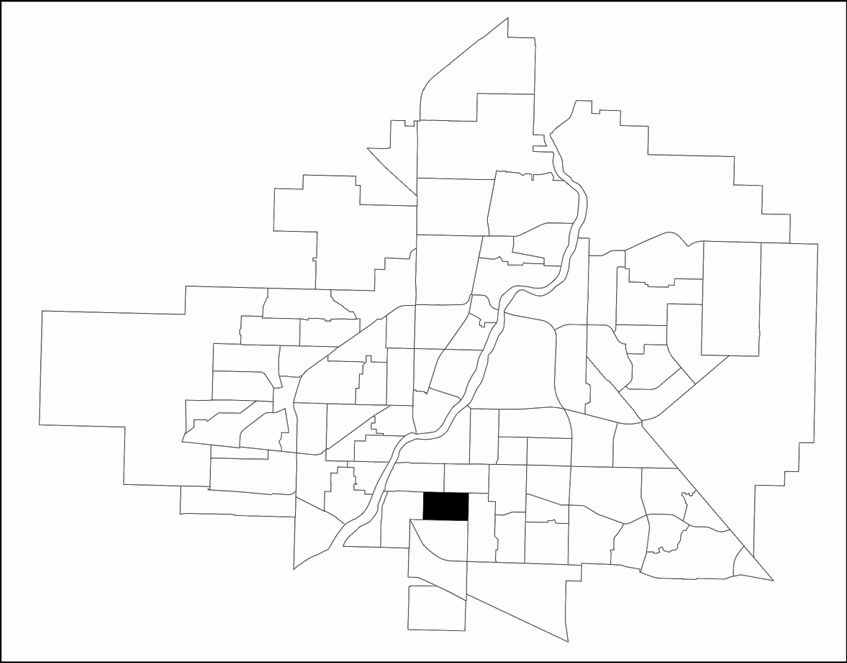
- Queen Elizabeth location map
- Coordinates: 52°6′13″N 106°39′20″W
- Country: Canada
- Province: Saskatchewan
- City: Saskatoon
- Suburban Development Area: Nutana
- Neighbourhood: Queen Elizabeth
- Annexed: 1910-1919
- Construction: 1946-1970

Government
  - Type: Municipal (Ward 7)
  - Administrative body: Saskatoon City Council
  - Councillor: Mairin Loewen

Area
  - Total: 1.0 km^{2} (0.39 sq mi)

Population (2009)
  - Total: 2,491
  - Average Income: $61,094
- Time zone: UTC-6 (UTC)
- Website: Queen Elizabeth Community Association

Queen Elizabeth is a mostly residential neighbourhood located in south-central Saskatoon, Saskatchewan, Canada. It is a suburban subdivision, consisting mostly of low-density, single detached dwellings. As of 2007, the area is home to 2,491 residents. The neighbourhood is considered a middle-income area, with an average family income of $61,904, an average dwelling value of $280,970 and a home ownership rate of 66.9%.

== History ==
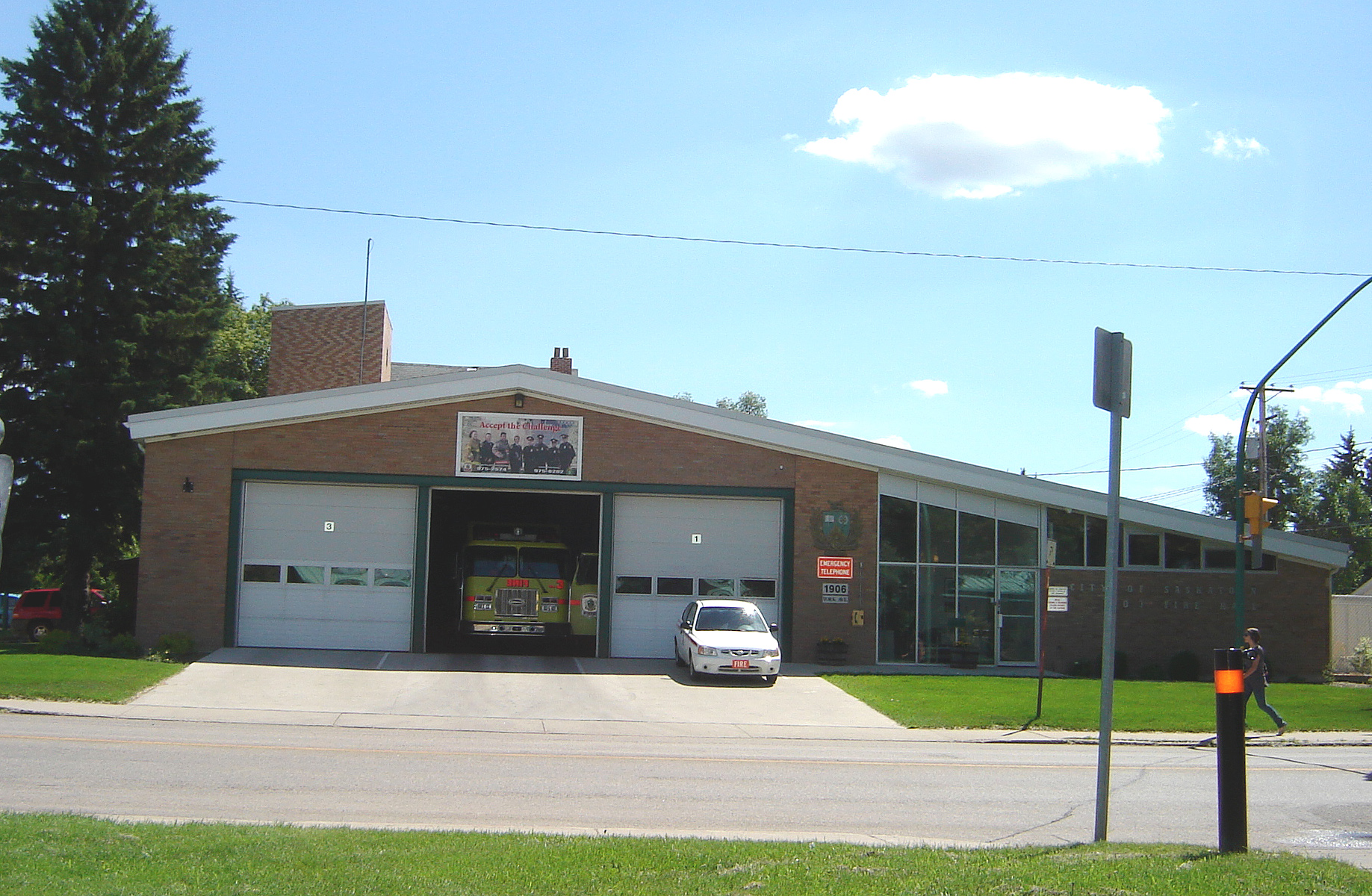
Fire Station #3

The land for the neighbourhood was annexed by the city between 1910 and 1919. A 1913 map shows that the present-day Queen Elizabeth area overlaps two registered subdivisions of the day: the G.T.P. 1/4 Section in the west, and part of the Broadway Addition in the east. During the speculative real estate market between 1909 and 1912, ambitious developers had a local lumber company built three stately brick homes at 1906, 1908 and 1910 York Avenue (at the intersection with Taylor Street). Though they were far away from the city core, developers anticipated that residential building would soon expand outward quickly. Foundations for other houses nearby were built, but abruptly abandoned as a recession took hold in 1913. Meanwhile, the homes became known as the "Three Sisters" and were landmarks for travellers. The city eventually developed the land near the houses in around 1953. The northmost "sister" was demolished to make way for Fire Station #3 - the two remaining homes survive to the present day.

Home construction begin in earnest until after World War II. Gladmer Park, a complex of four-unit semi-detached houses, was developed in the 1950s as one of several Limited Dividend Housing Projects constructed in Saskatoon. Financing was provided by the Canada Mortgage and Housing Corporation repayable over a 40-year period. A condition of the mortgage required that this project provide low rent housing over the 40-year term.

The portion of the community bounded by Broadway and Melrose avenues and Isabella and Hilliard streets was originally marketed in the early 1950s under the name Broadacres. In 1953, newspaper advertisements promoted Broadacres as Saskatoon's first "controlled subdivision" (today's term being "master-planned community"). Lot-buyers were initially required to agree to certain development regulations, including a minimum 900-square-foot main floor footprint on homes and no front fencing. It kept the Broadacres name into the late 1950s.

Queen Elizabeth School was designed by local architect Frank J. Martin. It was built in 1953 and opened in September 1954. Aden Bowman Collegiate was opened in 1958.

== Government and politics ==
Queen Elizabeth exists within the federal electoral district of Saskatoon—Grasswood. It is currently represented by Kevin Waugh of the Conservative Party of Canada, first elected in 2015.

Provincially, the area is divided by Eastlake Avenue into the constituencies of Saskatoon Eastview and Saskatoon Nutana. Saskatoon Eastview is currently represented by Corey Tochor of the Saskatchewan Party since 2011. Saskatoon Nutana is currently represented by Cathy Sproule of the Saskatchewan New Democratic Party since 2011.

In Saskatoon's non-partisan municipal politics, Queen Elizabeth lies within ward 7. It is currently represented by Councillor Mairin Loewen, who was elected to city council in a 2011 by-election.

== Institutions ==
=== Education ===
Queen Elizabeth School
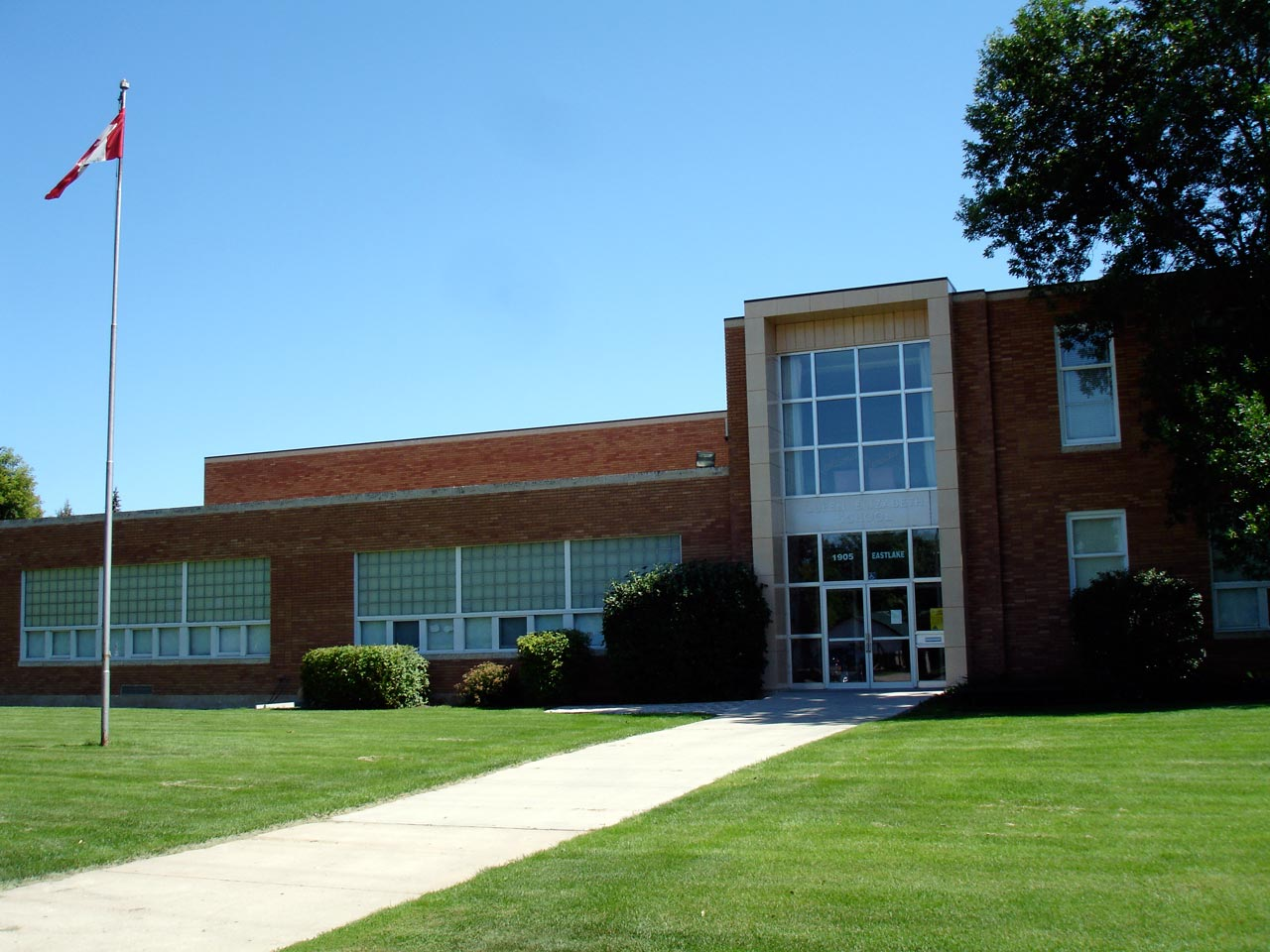
- 1905 Eastlake Avenue; Saskatoon, Saskatchewan, S7J 0W9; Canada

Information
- Type: Elementary
- Opened: 1954
- School board: Saskatoon Public Schools
- Principal: Janet Simpson
- Grades: Kindergarten to Grade 8
- Enrollment: 143 (2017)
- Education system: Public
- Language: English
- Feeder to: Aden Bowman Collegiate
- Website: Queen Elizabeth School

- Queen Elizabeth School - public elementary school, part of the Saskatoon Public School Division. Declining enrolment at the school in the 2000s (decade) prompted the school board to offer part of the building to the Saskatoon Open Door Society (SODS), an organization providing services to immigrants and refugees. Since 2008, SODS has operated adult language classes in the school, and is slated to open a day care in 2010.
- Aden Bowman Collegiate - public secondary, part of the Saskatoon Public School Division

== Parks and recreation ==
- Weaver Park - 10.2 acres (4.1 ha)

The Queen Elizabeth Community Association serves residents by offering recreational, social, and educational programs for adults, children/youth, and preschoolers. The association serves the west half of the Haultain neighbourhood as well.

== Public services ==
Queen Elizabeth is a part of the east division of the Saskatoon Police Service's patrol system. Saskatoon Fire & Protective Services' east division covers the neighbourhood. Fire Station #3 was previously located at 1906 York Avenue, before relocating to 2611 Clarence Avenue South in 2018. Transit services to Queen Elizabeth are provided by Saskatoon Transit on routes No. 6 (Clarence - Broadway) and 13 (Lawson - Exhibition).

== Commercial ==
The only commercial developments in Queen Elizabeth are businesses located at the intersection of Broadway Avenue and Taylor Street. In addition, there are 27 home-based businesses in the neighbourhood.

== Location ==
Queen Elizabeth is located within the Nutana Suburban Development Area. It is bounded by Taylor Street to the north, Ruth Street to the south, Melrose Avenue to the west, and Clarence Avenue to the east. Roads are laid out in a grid fashion; streets run east-west, avenues run north-south.

== See also ==
- Royal eponyms in Canada
