= Aden Bowman Collegiate =

Secondary school in Saskatchewan, Canada

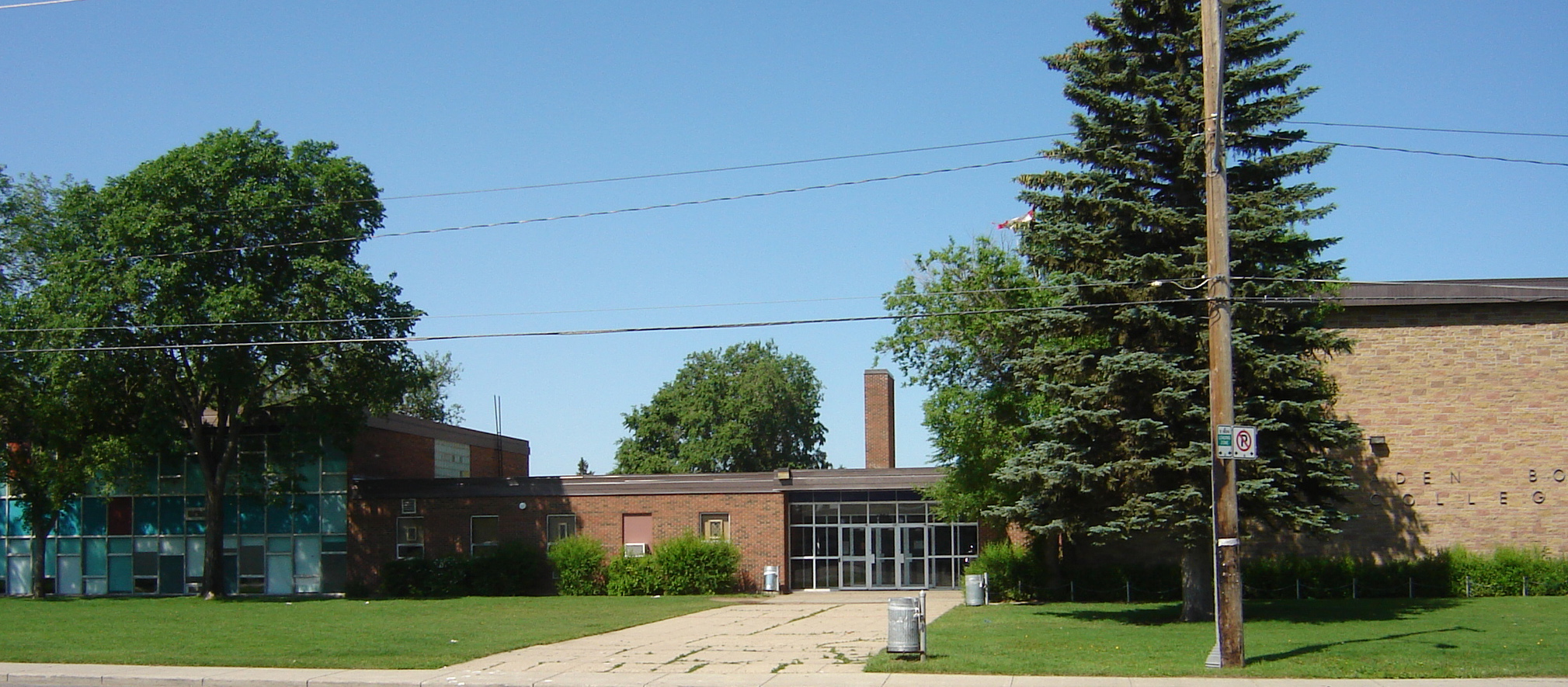

Location
- 1904 Clarence Avenue South; Saskatoon, Saskatchewan, S7J 1L3; Canada; 52.106522°N 106.647234°W

Information
- Type: Secondary
- Opened: 1958
- School board: Saskatoon Public Schools
- Principal: Ryan Brimacombe
- Grades: Grades 9 – 12
- Enrollment: 856 (2022)
- Education system: Public
- Colours: Green and gold
- Team name: Bears
- Website: Aden Bowman Collegiate

Aden Bowman Collegiate is in the Queen Elizabeth subdivision, in Saskatoon, Saskatchewan, serving students from grades 9 through 12. It is also known as Aden Bowman, Bowman, or ABCI. The school was opened on September 2, 1958.

Aden Bowman is known for the IB program and its fine arts program.

== Fine arts ==
Aden Bowman is home of the Robert Hinitt or 'Castle' Theatre. The theatre, designed by a former teacher, includes a fly tower, a thrust stage and seating for about 670 people. Renovations occurred in the late 1990s which improved but altered the look of the original design of the theatre. A new ceiling was installed over the house, the thrust stage was redesigned and its ability to move under the proscenium stage was removed, a loading gallery for the fly gallery was installed, seating which came from the Capitol Theatre was removed and replaced with new seating, and the lobby was reconfigured. The theatre is rented to many outside groups. Robert Hinitt died on November 11, 2011, at Oliver Lodge, Saskatoon.

Senior drama productions are held each fall. They are open to students in grades 11 and 12. Youth theatre and musicals alternate every year. One-acts take place each spring and are directed by senior students.

Hordern Hall, designed by the school's first band director, houses the music facility. The hall includes a large rehearsal hall, in which none of the walls are at 90 degrees for acoustics. The hall also has four smaller music practice rooms and two larger ensemble rooms. Hordern Hall has easy access to Robert Hinitt Theatre.

== Sports ==
Sport	Grade	Season
Junior and senior football	9–12	Aug.-Nov.
Freshman, junior and senior volleyball	9–12	Sept.-Nov.
Freshman, junior and senior basketball	9–12	Nov.-March
Junior and senior badminton	10–12	March–May
Senior soccer	9–12	Aug.-Nov.
Cross country running	9–12	Aug.-Oct.
Wrestling	9–12	Dec.-March
Track	9–12	March–May
Girls' and boys' curling	9–12	Oct.-March

Aden Bowman's senior football team competes in the Saskatoon League, in the 4A division, which is the highest level of collegiate football in Saskatchewan. The team has played 52 seasons since forming in 1958, and has won eight city championships (1963, 1964, 1965, 1970, 1976, 2007, 2008 and 2009) and three provincial 4A titles (1970, 2007, and 2009). Since the rebirth of its program in the 2004 season, Aden Bowman football has led Saskatoon, with 27 alumni completing at least one season on the roster of either a Canadian Junior Football League or CIS Football roster (up to and including the 2011 season). In this time Aden Bowman has amassed the league's best winning percentage in both regular season (.85) and playoff contests (.80), and has played in six of the last seven city league championships (2004, 2005, 2007, 2008, 2009, 2010).

The Bears' traditional rivals are fellow Taylor Street schools Holy Cross High School and Walter Murray Collegiate.

== History ==
The name for the school comes from local businessman Aden Bowman, who came to Saskatoon in 1907 at the age of eighteen with no more than a grade nine education. With little knowledge about the field, Bowman purchased a small bicycle repair business on 20th Street. The business was very successful and over the next few years it expanded beyond bicycles to repairing automobiles and motorcycles. Throughout Bowman's success he realised the importance of a strong education, which he shared with his children and grandchildren. Bowman wanted to help the community with his self-made success, so he served as alderman for twelve years and was the chairman of the collegiate board for fourteen years.

This was the first collegiate to be named after a person, rather than a program or location of the school.

Currently its feeder schools are Buena Vista School, Chief Whitecap School, Holliston School, Hugh Cairns, V. C. School, John Lake School, Prince Philip School, Queen Elizabeth School and Victoria School.

The school opened in 1958 on September 2.

== Weekend education ==
The Saskatoon Japanese Language School (サスカトーン補習授業校 Sasukatōn Hoshū Jugyō Kō), a weekend Japanese educational program, holds its classes at Aden Bowman Collegiate.

== Notable alumni ==
- Nathan Cherry, Canadian football player
- Gayleen Froese, author
- Keith Magnuson, hockey player
- Kevin Mambo, Broadway and screen actor; two-time Emmy winner
- Joni Mitchell, singer, artist
- Krista Phillips, basketball player
- Don Sparrow, illustrator
- Brendan Taman, football executive
