= Judy Junor =

Canadian politician

The Honourable Judy Junor ECS

Member of the Saskatchewan Legislative Assembly for Saskatoon Eastview
- In office June 24, 1998 – October 10, 2011
- Preceded by: Bob Pringle
- Succeeded by: Corey Tochor

Personal details
- Born: July 27, 1948 (age 77) North Battleford, Saskatchewan
- Party: New Democratic Party
- Occupation: Nurse

Judy Junor (born July 27, 1948) is a Canadian provincial politician. Judy was a New Democratic Party (NDP) member of the Legislative Assembly of Saskatchewan for the constituency of Saskatoon Eastview.

Born in North Battleford, she grew up in Saskatoon and received a diploma from St. Paul's School of Nursing in 1969. She worked as a nurse in Saskatoon and served as president of the Saskatchewan Union of Nurses and as vice-president of the Saskatchewan Federation of Labour.

She was first elected to the legislature in a 1998 by-election following the resignation of Bob Pringle. Junor served in the provincial cabinet as associate minister of Health, as Provincial Secretary and as Minister of Learning.

She lost in the 2011 election to Corey Tochor of the Saskatchewan Party.
