= Bernard Poniatowski =

Canadian politician

MLA for Saskatoon Eastview
- In office 1978–1982
- Preceded by: Glen Penner
- Succeeded by: Kim Young

Personal details
- Born: January 9, 1939 (age 87) Kinloch, Saskatchewan
- Party: Saskatchewan New Democratic Party
- Occupation: teacher

Bernard John Poniatowski (born January 9, 1939) was a Canadian politician. He served in the Legislative Assembly of Saskatchewan from 1978 to 1982, as a NDP member for the constituency of Saskatoon Eastview. He is a teacher.
