= Matt Love =

Canadian politician

Matt Love MLA

Caucus Chair of the New Democratic Party
- Incumbent
- Assumed office October 5, 2022
- Leader: Carla Beck

Shadow Minister of Education
- Incumbent
- Assumed office November 13, 2024

Critic, Education; Seniors; Rural and Remote Health
- In office October 5, 2022 – November 13, 2024
- Leader: Carla Beck

Member of the Saskatchewan Legislative Assembly for Saskatoon Eastview
- Incumbent
- Assumed office October 26, 2020
- Preceded by: Corey Tochor

Personal details
- Party: New Democratic Party
- Profession: Teacher

Matt Love is a Canadian politician serving as a member of the Legislative Assembly of Saskatchewan (MLA). Love was elected in the 2020 Saskatchewan general election and represents the electoral district of Saskatoon Eastview. Love is as a member of the Saskatchewan New Democratic Party (NDP) caucus.

== Political career ==
On November 4, 2020, Love was named NDP critic for Municipal Affairs, Tourism, Seniors, Ethics and Democracy, and Parks, Culture and Sport, in addition to serving as the deputy Caucus Chair.

After Carla Beck succeeded Ryan Meili as NDP leader in the summer of 2022, Love was named NDP critic for Education, Seniors, and Rural and Remote Health, and was also named Caucus Chair.

As Education Critic—and a former teacher—Love led the Opposition's criticism of the governing Saskatchewan Party's controversial Parents' Bill of Rights, which was enshrined in law on October 20, 2023 after the government invoked the notwithstanding clause. The bill amended the province's Education Act to include new parental consent provisions around sexual health education and the use of gender-related names and pronouns in schools. The government recalled the Legislature early for an emergency 40-hour debate on the legislation, most of which was used by the NDP to attack the legislation for undermining the human rights of children. During the debate, Love spoke for 8.5 hours and focused attention on a Court of King's Bench injunction that was granted against the parental consent policy before the legislation was tabled. Love also introduced two amendments to the legislation: a "do no harm" clause, which would void the parental consent requirement in cases where mental health professionals determined that there was no safe way to involve parents, and a parental engagement strategy; both amendments were defeated by the government.

== Electoral record ==
2024 Saskatchewan general election: Saskatoon Eastview
Party	Candidate	Votes	%	±%
New Democratic	Matt Love	5,392	59.42	+12.32
Saskatchewan	Francis Kreiser	3,362	37.05	-13.25
Saskatchewan United	Brad McAvoy	196	2.16	–
Green	Kendra Anderson	125	1.38	-1.12
Total valid votes		9,075	98.92	
Total rejected ballots		99	1.08	+0.02
Turnout		9,174	64.78	+2.01
Eligible voters		14,161		
New Democratic notional gain from Saskatchewan		Swing		–
Source: Elections Saskatchewan

2020 Saskatchewan general election: Saskatoon Eastview
Party	Candidate	Votes	%	±%
New Democratic	Matt Love	4,063	50.78	+9.83
Saskatchewan	Chris Guérette	3,704	46.29	-7.10
Green	Jan Norris	234	2.93	+0.75
Total valid votes		8,001	98.94	
Total rejected ballots		86	1.06	+0.96
Turnout		8,087	62.77	+0.35
Eligible voters		12,844		
New Democratic gain from Saskatchewan		Swing		–
Source: Elections Saskatchewan
