= Glen Howard Penner =

Canadian politician

Saskatoon City Councillor
- In office 2000-2012

Saskatoon City Councillor
- In office 1988–1994

Saskatoon City Alderman
- In office 1979–1982

MLA for Saskatoon Eastview
- In office 1975–1979
- Succeeded by: Bernard Poniatowski

Saskatoon City Alderman
- In office 1972-1975

Personal details
- Born: July 20, 1940 Dodsland, Saskatchewan
- Died: June 5, 2023 (aged 82)
- Party: Liberal Party of Saskatchewan
- Occupation: Educator

Glen Howard Penner (July 20, 1940 – June 5, 2023) was a Canadian politician. He served in the Legislative Assembly of Saskatchewan from 1975 to 1979, as a Liberal member for the constituency of Saskatoon Eastview. He was also one of the longest-serving members of Saskatoon City Council, serving for 25 years over four separate stints.

== Early life, education and career ==
Penner was born in the village of Dodsland in west central Saskatchewan. When he was 8, his family moved to Saskatoon and he attended Wilson Elementary School and City Park Collegiate before attending the University of Saskatchewan. There he earned bachelor's and master's degrees in Education. He went on to have a nearly four-decade education career as a teacher, principal, and administrator in Saskatoon and Regina.

== Political career ==
Penner first ran for office in 1972 when he was elected as an alderman on Saskatoon City Council. In 1975, he transitioned to provincial politics, and was elected as MLA for Saskatoon Eastview as a member of the Liberal Party. In 1979 he returned to civic politics, serving again on Saskatoon City Council until 1982, when he moved to Regina. After returning to Saskatoon, Penner was once again elected to Council in 1988, serving until 1994, and then in 2000, serving until 2012. When he retired from civic politics that year, he was less than 50 days shy for the record of most days served on council, which is held by John Cairns.

== Personal life ==
Penner and his wife Wilma, who married in 1962, have two children and four grandchildren. Penner was involved with numerous community organizations throughout his life, such as United Way and the Salvation Army, and was actively involved in minor sports as a supporter and coach.

== See also ==
- Saskatoon City Council
