= Don Sparrow =

Canadian illustrator

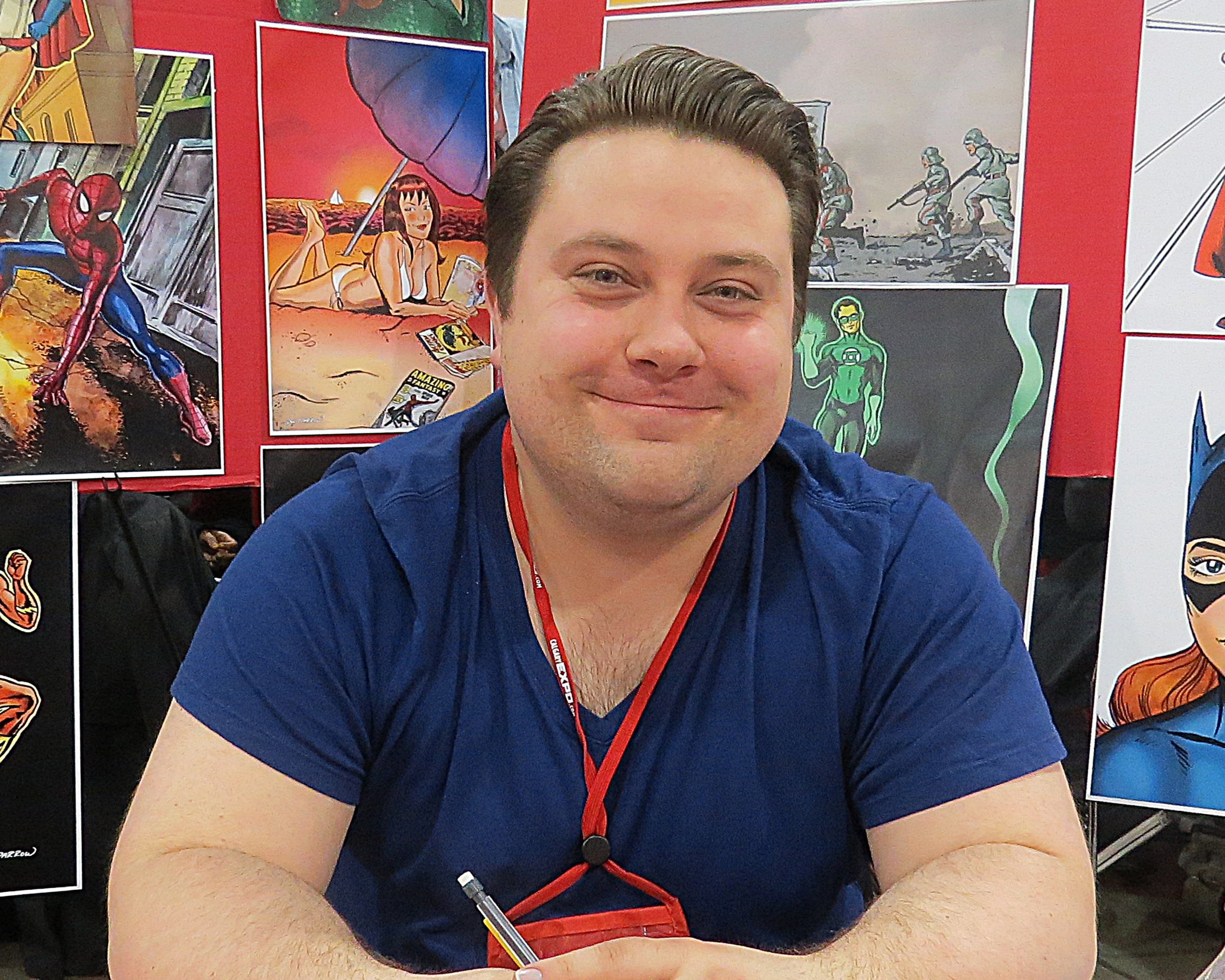
Sparrow in 2014

Don Sparrow is a Canadian illustrator, writer, and artist.

Publications in which he has been published include Computer Arts magazine , NUVO magazine , Ohio magazine and several others. In 2014 his work was seen on the NBC newsmagazine, Dateline NBC.

He trained at Canada's prestigious Sheridan College under the tutelage of such renowned illustrators as Joe Morse , Gary Taxali , Christoph Niemann and Kathryn Adams .

His artwork has been shown in exhibitions in Hamilton, Ontario, Oakville, Ontario, and Saskatoon's Mendel Art Gallery .

Senator Herbert O. Sparrow is his great-uncle.

He has also worked on album design for independent musicians such as The Fjords and Boycott Scott .
