= Regina Elphinstone =

Former provincial electoral district in Saskatchewan, Canada

Coordinates: 50.454°N 104.632°W

Regina Elphinstone is a former provincial electoral division in the Canadian province of Saskatchewan. It was the riding of former Premier Allan Blakeney and later of former Deputy Premier Dwain Lingenfelter.

== Members of the Legislative Assembly ==
Parliament	Years	Member	Party
Riding created from Regina Centre, Regina North West and Regina Lakeview
18th	1975–1978	Allan Blakeney	New Democrat
19th	1978–1982	Allan Blakeney	New Democrat
20th	1982–1986	Allan Blakeney	New Democrat
21st	1986–1988	Allan Blakeney	New Democrat
21st	1988–1991	Dwain Lingenfelter	New Democrat
22nd	1991–1995	Dwain Lingenfelter	New Democrat
23rd	1995–1999	Dwain Lingenfelter	New Democrat
24th	1999–2001	Dwain Lingenfelter	New Democrat
24th	2001–2003	Warren McCall	New Democrat
Riding dissolved into Regina Walsh Acres, Regina Rosemont and Regina Elphinstone-Centre

== See also ==
- List of Saskatchewan provincial electoral districts
- List of Saskatchewan general elections
- Canadian provincial electoral districts
