= Saskatoon Eastview =

Provincial electoral district in Saskatchewan, Canada

Coordinates: 52.1°N 106.62°W

Saskatchewan electoral district

Provincial electoral district
- Legislature: Legislative Assembly of Saskatchewan
MLA
Matt Love
New Democratic
- District created: 1974
- First contested: 1975
- Last contested: 2024

Demographics
- Electors: 11,637
- Communities: Saskatoon

Saskatoon Eastview is a provincial electoral district for the Legislative Assembly of Saskatchewan, Canada. This district includes the neighbourhoods of Queen Elizabeth, Eastview, Nutana Park, Adelaide/Churchill, and Avalon.

== History ==
The riding was created for the 1975 general election out of parts of Saskatoon Nutana Centre, Saskatoon Nutana South and Hanley, on what was the edge of town.

For the 1991 general election, the riding was renamed Saskatoon Eastview-Haultain. The name was changed back to Saskatoon Eastview for the 1995 general election, and the riding was shifted south to include the area that is now the neighbourhood of Stonebridge. This rural area was transferred to Saskatoon Southeast for the 2003 general election, making Saskatoon Eastview into a strictly urban constituency.

Since 2003, the riding's boundaries have remained more or less the same, aside from minor adjustments. For the 2016 general election, the riding gained most of Queen Elizabeth from Saskatoon Nutana and lost most of Holliston to Saskatoon Churchill-Wildwood. For the next general election, the riding will gain most of Lakeview from Saskatoon Southeast and lose Avalon to Saskatoon Stonebridge.

The riding has traditionally been a relatively safe seat for the New Democratic Party, though the Progressive Conservative and Saskatchewan parties won the riding in their landslide victories of 1982, 2011 and 2016. The riding was vacated in fall 2019 when Saskatchewan Party MLA Corey Tochor resigned to successfully run in the 2019 Canadian federal election. A by-election was never called and the seat remained vacant for just over a year until the 2020 general election when Matt Love re-took the riding for the NDP.

== Members of the Legislative Assembly ==
Legislature	Years	Member	Party
Saskatoon Eastview
18th	1975–1978	Glen Penner	Liberal
19th	1978–1982	Bernard Poniatowski	New Democrat
20th	1982–1986	Kim Young	Progressive Conservative
21st	1986–1988	Ray Martineau	Progressive Conservative
21st	1988–1991	Bob Pringle	New Democrat
Saskatoon Eastview-Haultain
22nd	1991–1995	Bob Pringle	New Democrat
Saskatoon Eastview
23rd	1995–1998	Bob Pringle	New Democrat
23rd	1998–1999	Judy Junor	New Democrat
24th	1999–2003	Judy Junor	New Democrat
25th	2003–2007	Judy Junor	New Democrat
26th	2007–2011	Judy Junor	New Democrat
27th	2011–2016	Corey Tochor	Saskatchewan Party
28th	2016–2019	Corey Tochor	Saskatchewan Party
28th	2019–2020	Vacant
29th	2020–2024	Matt Love	New Democrat
30th	2024–present	Matt Love	New Democrat

== Election results ==
2024 Saskatchewan general election
Party	Candidate	Votes	%	±%
New Democratic	Matt Love	5,392	59.42	+12.32
Saskatchewan	Francis Kreiser	3,362	37.05	-13.25
Saskatchewan United	Brad McAvoy	196	2.16	–
Green	Kendra Anderson	125	1.38	-1.12
Total valid votes		9,075	98.92	
Total rejected ballots		99	1.08	+0.02
Turnout		9,174	64.78	+2.01
Eligible voters		14,161		
New Democratic notional gain from Saskatchewan		Swing		–
Source: Elections Saskatchewan

2020 provincial election redistributed results
Party	%
Saskatchewan	50.3
New Democratic	47.1
Green	2.5

2020 Saskatchewan general election
Party	Candidate	Votes	%	±%
New Democratic	Matt Love	4,063	50.78	+9.83
Saskatchewan	Chris Guérette	3,704	46.29	-7.10
Green	Jan Norris	234	2.93	+0.75
Total valid votes		8,001	98.94	
Total rejected ballots		86	1.06	+0.96
Turnout		8,087	62.77	+0.35
Eligible voters		12,844		
New Democratic gain from Saskatchewan		Swing		–
Source: Elections Saskatchewan

2016 Saskatchewan general election
Party	Candidate	Votes	%	±%
Saskatchewan	Corey Tochor	4,169	53.39	-4.13
New Democratic	Jesse Todd	3,198	40.95	+1.40
Liberal	Ana Ashraf	272	3.48	-
Green	Shawn Setyo	170	2.18	-0.76
Total valid votes		7,809	99.90	
Total rejected ballots		8	0.10	-0.46
Turnout		7,817	62.42	-15.97
Eligible voters		12,524		
Saskatchewan hold		Swing		-2.76
Source: Elections Saskatchewan

2011 Saskatchewan general election
Party	Candidate	Votes	%	±%
Saskatchewan	Corey Tochor	5,217	57.51	+15.27
NDP	Judy Junor	3,588	39.56	-5.80
Green	Shawn Setyo	266	2.93	+0.39
Total		9,071	100.00	

2007 Saskatchewan general election
Party	Candidate	Votes	%	±%
NDP	Judy Junor	4,508	45.36	+0.72
Saskatchewan	Terry Alm	4,198	42.24	+14.67
Liberal	Paul Maczek	980	9.86	-16.75
Green	Keane Gruending	252	2.54	+1.36
Total		9,938	100.00	

2003 Saskatchewan general election
Party	Candidate	Votes	%	±%
NDP	Judy Junor	4,164	44.64	+1.14
Saskatchewan	Robin Bellamy	2,572	27.57	-4.01
Liberal	Rob Norris	2,482	26.61	+6.06
New Green	Sandy Ervin	110	1.18	-3.19
Total		9,328	100.00	

1999 Saskatchewan general election
Party	Candidate	Votes	%	±%
NDP	Judy Junor	3,644	43.50	-1.65
Saskatchewan	Francis Kreiser	2,646	31.58	+12.29
Liberal	Bernie Yuzdepski	1,722	20.55	-15.01
New Green	Sandy Ervin	366	4.37	*
Total		8,378	100.00	

June 24, 1998 By-Election: Saskatoon Eastview
Party	Candidate	Votes	%	±%
NDP	Judy Junor	2,904	45.15	-10.53
Liberal	Jim Melenchuk	2,287	35.56	-0.54
Saskatchewan	Francis Kreiser	1,241	19.29	*
Total		6,432	100.00	

1995 Saskatchewan general election: Saskatoon Eastview
Party	Candidate	Votes	%	±%
NDP	Bob Pringle	4,738	55.68	+3.15
Liberal	Francis Kreiser	3,072	36.10	+7.90
Prog. Conservative	Richard Bing-Wo	699	8.22	-11.05
Total		8,509	100.00	

1991 Saskatchewan general election: Saskatoon Eastview-Haultain
Party	Candidate	Votes	%	±%
NDP	Bob Pringle	4,630	52.53	-1.00
Liberal	Dan Kolysher	2,485	28.20	+8.40
Prog. Conservative	Bob Myers	1,698	19.27	-7.40
Total		8,813	100.00	

May 4, 1988 By-Election: Saskatoon Eastview
Party	Candidate	Votes	%	±%
NDP	Bob Pringle	6,685	53.53	+14.59
Prog. Conservative	Toni Davidson	3,330	26.67	-16.41
Liberal	Pat Beck	2,473	19.80	+1.82
Total		12,488	100.00	

1986 Saskatchewan general election
Party	Candidate	Votes	%	±%
Prog. Conservative	Ray Martineau	6,356	43.08	-18.13
NDP	Dixie Campbell-Tymchatyn	5,745	38.94	+6.18
Liberal	Vic Karwacki	2,653	17.98	+11.95
Total		14,754	100.00	

1982 Saskatchewan general election
Party	Candidate	Votes	%	±%
Prog. Conservative	Kimberly Young	6,981	61.21	+22.57
NDP	Bernard Poniatowski	3,736	32.76	-13.98
Liberal	David Jackson	688	6.03	-8.59
Total		11,405	100.00	

1978 Saskatchewan general election
Party	Candidate	Votes	%	±%
NDP	Bernard Poniatowski	4,018	46.74	+11.81
Prog. Conservative	Kimberly Young	3,322	38.64	+18.55
Liberal	Marie Eaton	1,257	14.62	-30.36
Total		8,597	100.00	

1975 Saskatchewan general election: Saskatoon Eastview
Party	Candidate	Votes	%	±%
Liberal	Glen Penner	3,175	44.98	-2.68
NDP	Reg Parker	2,466	34.93	-17.41
Prog. Conservative	Larry Fast	1,418	20.09	-
Total		7,059	100.00	

== See also ==
- List of Saskatchewan provincial electoral districts
- List of Saskatchewan general elections
- Canadian provincial electoral districts
