= Ralph Katzman =

Canadian politician (1940–2025)

Ralph Katzman (May 13, 1940 – June 13, 2025) was a Canadian farmer and political figure in Saskatchewan. He represented Rosthern from 1975 to 1986 in the Legislative Assembly of Saskatchewan as a Progressive Conservative.

== Life and career ==
Katzman was born in Prince Albert, Saskatchewan, the son of Labe Katzman, and was educated in Saskatoon and at the University of Saskatchewan, where he studied agriculture. In 1970, Katzman married Lucille Jean Martler. He served as government whip in the provincial assembly and was also legislative secretary for the ministers of agriculture and highways. In 2000, Katzman was found guilty of fraud for diverting $450,000 from the Conservative caucus bank account to a private bank account; this was related to a political scandal involving Saskatchewan Progressive Conservatives during the 1980s. He was sentenced to one year in jail and ordered to repay over $100,000.

Katzman died on June 13, 2025, at the age of 85.
