= Kimberly John Young =

Canadian politician

MLA for Saskatoon Eastview
- In office 1982–1986

Personal details
- Born: March 20, 1951 (age 75) Vanguard, Saskatchewan
- Party: Progressive Conservative Party of Saskatchewan

Kimberly John Young (born March 20, 1951) is a Canadian politician. He served in the Legislative Assembly of Saskatchewan from 1982 to 1986, as a Progressive Conservative member for the constituency of Saskatoon Eastview.
