= Corey Tochor =

Canadian Member of Parliament

Corey Tochor MP
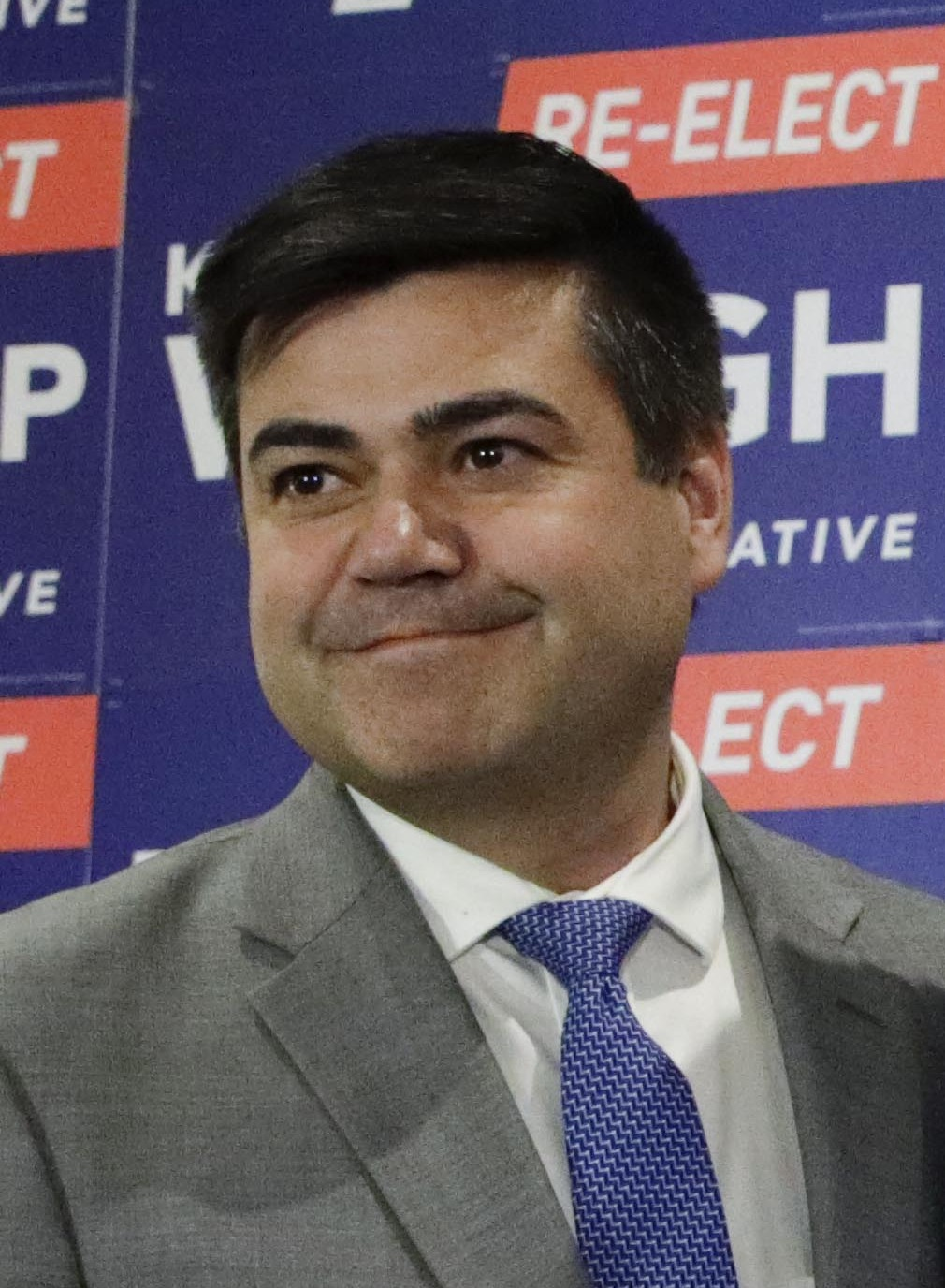

Member of Parliament for Saskatoon East Saskatoon—University (2019–2026)
- Incumbent
- Assumed office October 21, 2019
- Preceded by: Brad Trost

26th Speaker of the Legislative Assembly of Saskatchewan
- In office May 17, 2016 – January 5, 2018
- Preceded by: Dan D'Autremont
- Succeeded by: Mark Docherty

Member of the Legislative Assembly of Saskatchewan for Saskatoon Eastview
- In office November 7, 2011 – September 11, 2019
- Preceded by: Judy Junor
- Succeeded by: Matt Love

Personal details
- Born: 1976 or 1977 (age 48–49) Esterhazy, Saskatchewan, Canada
- Party: Conservative (federal) Saskatchewan Party (provincial)

Corey James Tochor MP (born 1976 or 1977) is a Canadian politician who has served as the member of Parliament (MP) for Saskatoon—University since the 2019 federal election.

== Political career ==
Tochor was elected to the Legislative Assembly of Saskatchewan in the 2011 election, to represent the constituency of Saskatoon Eastview as a member of the Saskatchewan Party caucus. Tochor was re-elected in the 2016 general election, held on April 4, 2016. On May 17, 2016, he was elected the Speaker of the Legislative Assembly of Saskatchewan, defeating the previous Speaker, Dan D'Autremont. On January 5, 2018, Tochor resigned as Speaker.

On March 10, 2018, he defeated incumbent MP Brad Trost for the Conservative nomination in Saskatoon—University. Tochor resigned his provincial seat on September 11, 2019, the same day the Writs of election were issued for the 2019 Canadian federal election. He successfully held the seat for the Conservatives.

== Election results ==
=== Federal ===
2025 Canadian federal election: Saskatoon—University
** Preliminary results — Not yet official **
Party	Candidate	Votes	%	±%	Expenditures
Conservative	Corey Tochor	23,178	48.87	+0.95	
Liberal	Greg Poelzer	19,622	41.37	+30.51	
New Democratic	Melissa McGillivray	4,035	8.51	–26.89	
People's	Jaxson Boot	327	0.69	–3.49	
Green	Isaiah Hunter	263	0.55	–0.40	
Total valid votes/expense limit					
Total rejected ballots					
Turnout		47,425	72.35		
Eligible voters		65,548			
Conservative notional hold		Swing		–14.78	
Source: Elections Canada

2021 Canadian federal election: Saskatoon—University
Party	Candidate	Votes	%	±%	Expenditures
Conservative	Corey Tochor	20,389	48.0	-4.13	$49,119.86
New Democratic	Claire Card	15,042	35.4	+5.64	$64,131.11
Liberal	Dawn Dumont Walker	4,608	10.8	-2.27	$28,794.80
People's	Guto Penteado	1,778	4.2	+2.78	$7,791.19
Green	North-Marie Hunter	405	1.0	-1.98	$200.47
Christian Heritage	Carl A. Wesolowski	195	0.5	-0.15	$4,979.31
Communist	Jeremy Fisher	100	0.2	–	$0.00
Total valid votes/expense limit		42,517	99.31	–	$103,229.52
Total rejected ballots		294	0.69	+0.12	
Turnout		42,811	69.17	-7.1	
Eligible voters		61,894			
Conservative hold		Swing		-4.89	
Source: Elections Canada

2019 Canadian federal election: Saskatoon—University
Party	Candidate	Votes	%	±%	Expenditures
Conservative	Corey Tochor	24,514	52.13	+10.60	$53,397.85
New Democratic	Claire Card	13,994	29.76	-1.77	$48,544.63
Liberal	Susan Hayton	6,146	13.07	-12.14	$48,086.76
Green	Jan Norris	1,401	2.98	+1.45	$2,596.44
People's	Guto Penteado	667	1.42	-	$8,671.07
Christian Heritage	Jeff Willerton	305	0.65	-	$11,862.47
Total valid votes/expense limit		47,027	99.43		
Total rejected ballots		271	0.57	+0.28	
Turnout		47,298	76.27	-0.62	
Eligible voters		62,012			
Conservative hold		Swing		+6.19	
Source: Elections Canada

=== Provincial ===
2016 Saskatchewan general election: Saskatoon Eastview
Party	Candidate	Votes	%	±%
Saskatchewan	Corey Tochor	4,169	53.4%	-4.1
New Democratic	Jesse Todd	3,198	41.0%	+1.4
Liberal	Ana Ashraf	272	3.5%	+3.5
Green	Shawn Setyo	170	2.2%	-0.7
Total		7,809	100.00%	

2011 Saskatchewan general election: Saskatoon Eastview
Party	Candidate	Votes	%	±%
Saskatchewan	Corey Tochor	5,217	57.5%	+15.3
New Democratic	Judy Junor	3,588	39.6%	-5.8
Green	Shawn Setyo	266	2.9%	+0.4
Total		9,071	100.00%	
