= Bob Pringle (politician) =

Canadian politician

The Honourable Bob Pringle ECS

Member of the Legislative Assembly of Saskatchewan
- In office 1988–1998
- Preceded by: Ray Martineau
- Succeeded by: Judy Junor
- Constituency: Saskatoon Eastview

City of Saskatoon Councillor
- In office 2006–2010
- Preceded by: Terry Alm
- Succeeded by: Mairin Loewen
- Constituency: Ward 7

Personal details
- Born: April 25, 1946 (age 79) Regina, Saskatchewan
- Party: New Democratic Party
- Occupation: Social worker

Robert Murray Pringle (born April 25, 1946 in Regina, Saskatchewan) is a former Canadian politician, who last served as a city councillor for Ward 7 on Saskatoon City Council in Saskatoon, Saskatchewan. He previously served as a New Democratic Party member of the Legislative Assembly of Saskatchewan, representing the electoral district of Saskatoon Eastview from 1988 to 1998. While in the legislature, he served as Minister of Social Services and Minister Responsible for Senior's Issues in the government of Roy Romanow.

Pringle has bachelor's and master's degrees in social work from the University of Manitoba. He previously was the CEO of the Saskatoon Food Bank, and as executive directors of Cosmo Industries, the Saskatoon Housing Coalition, and Habitat for Humanity Saskatoon. He began a five-year term as Saskatchewan's children's advocate starting on January 1, 2011, and as such resigned his seat on city council on December 31, 2010.
