= Pierre Raymond Martineau =

Canadian politician

Pierre Raymond "Ray" Martineau (September 12, 1935 – November 18, 2023) was a businessman and political figure in Saskatchewan. He represented Saskatoon Eastview from 1986 to 1987 in the Legislative Assembly of Saskatchewan as a Progressive Conservative.

He was born in Saskatoon, Saskatchewan, the son of Angenard Martineau and Adrienne Ranger, and was educated at the Saskatoon Technical College and the University of Saskatchewan. In 1964, Martineau married Mary Lou Carter. He resigned his seat in the provincial assembly in June 1987.
