= Murray Koskie =

Canadian politician

Murray James Koskie (November 5, 1929 – March 14, 2004) was an educator, lawyer and political figure in Saskatchewan. He represented Quill Lakes from 1975 to 1995 in the Legislative Assembly of Saskatchewan as a New Democratic Party (NDP) member.

He was born in Sinnet, Saskatchewan, the son of Frank Koskie, was raised on the family farm and was educated in Humboldt and at the University of Saskatchewan, where he received a BEd and LLB. Koskie taught school, was a school principal and practised law in Humboldt, Regina and the Yukon.

He ran unsuccessfully in the provincial riding of Regina South West before being elected in 1975. Koskie served in the Saskatchewan cabinet as Minister of Social Services, as Minister of Consumer Affairs, as Minister of Consumer and Commercial Affairs and as Minister of Highways and Transportation. From 1982 to 1991, he served as opposition whip. He resigned from cabinet in 1993 and resigned his seat in 1995 after he was convicted of fraud related to the misuse of his MLA communications allowance. After leaving politics, Koskie lived in Muenster until his death in Humboldt at the age of 74.
