= Douglas Graham Taylor =

Canadian politician

Douglas Graham Taylor (July 4, 1936 – October 7, 2009) was an educator, farmer and political figure in Saskatchewan. He represented Indian Head-Wolseley from 1982 to 1991 in the Legislative Assembly of Saskatchewan as a Progressive Conservative member.

He was born near Moffat, Saskatchewan, the son of Robert Taylor, and was educated in Candiac, in Wolseley and at the University of Regina, where he received a BEd and a diploma in Educational Administration. Taylor taught school in Kipling and Wolseley, also serving as high school principal. He also operated a farm north of Wolseley. In October 1959, he married Katherine Isabel Garden.

Taylor ran unsuccessfully for the leadership of the provincial Progressive Conservative party. He was house leader for the official opposition in the Saskatchewan assembly and later served in the cabinet as Minister of Health, as Minister of Tourism and Small Business, as Minister of Supply and Services. as Minister of Tourism, Small Business and Co-operatives and as Minister of Public Participation. Taylor resigned from cabinet in October 1989 to become agent-general for the province in Hong Kong. He was removed from that post in 1991 when the New Democratic Party closed Saskatchewan's trade offices. Also in 1991, he retired from politics to the family farm near Wolseley. Taylor died in Wolseley from a heart attack at the age of 73, a few days after celebrating his 50th wedding anniversary.
