= Quill Lakes (provincial electoral district) =

Former provincial electoral district in Saskatchewan, Canada

Quill Lakes was a constituency of the Legislative Assembly of Saskatchewan.

== Geography ==
The district was based in the Quill Lakes area of Saskatchewan, Canada.

== Representation ==
- Murray James Koskie (1975 to 1995)

== See also ==
- List of Saskatchewan provincial electoral districts
- List of Saskatchewan general elections
- Canadian provincial electoral districts
