= 20th Saskatchewan Legislature =

Provincial legislature of Saskatchewan from 1982 to 1986

The 20th Legislative Assembly of Saskatchewan was elected in the Saskatchewan general election held in April 1982. The assembly sat from June 17, 1982, to September 19, 1986. The Progressive Conservative Party led by Grant Devine formed the government. The New Democratic Party (NDP) led by Allan Blakeney formed the official opposition.

Herbert Swan served as speaker for the assembly.

== Members of the Assembly ==
The following members were elected to the assembly in 1982:

Electoral district	Member	Party	First elected / previously elected	No.# of term(s)
Arm River	Gerald Muirhead	Progressive Conservative	1978	2nd term
Assiniboia-Gravelbourg	Allen Willard Engel	New Democratic Party	1971, (Note: Notukeu-Willow Bunch) 1978	3rd term*
Athabasca	Frederick John Thompson	New Democratic Party	1975	3rd term
Bengough-Milestone	Robert Hugh Pickering	Progressive Conservative	1978	2nd term
Biggar	Harry Daniel Baker	Progressive Conservative	1982	1st term
Canora	Lloyd Edward Hampton	Progressive Conservative	1982	1st term
Canora	Lloyd Edward Hampton	Independent	1982	1st term
Canora	Lloyd Edward Hampton	Western Canada Concept	1982	1st term
Canora	Lloyd Edward Hampton	Independent	1982	1st term
Cumberland	Lawrence Riel Yew	New Democratic Party	1982	1st term
Cut Knife-Lloydminster	Michael Alfred Hopfner	Progressive Conservative	1982	1st term
Estevan	Donald Grant Devine	Progressive Conservative	1982	1st term
Humboldt	Louis Albert Domotor	Progressive Conservative	1982	1st term
Indian Head-Wolseley	Douglas Graham Taylor	Progressive Conservative	1978	2nd term
Kelsey-Tisdale	Neal Herbert Hardy	Progressive Conservative	1980	2nd term
Kelvington-Wadena	Sherwin Petersen	Progressive Conservative	1982	1st term
Kindersley	Robert Lynal Andrew	Progressive Conservative	1978	2nd term
Kinistino	Bernard Joseph Leger Boutin	Progressive Conservative	1982	1st term
Last Mountain-Touchwood	Arnold Bernard Tusa	Progressive Conservative	1982	1st term
Maple Creek	Joan Duncan	Progressive Conservative	1978	2nd term
Meadow Lake	George Malcolm McLeod	Progressive Conservative	1978	2nd term
Melfort	Grant Milton Hodgins	Progressive Conservative	1982	1st term
Melville	Grant Jacob Schmidt	Progressive Conservative	1982	1st term
Moose Jaw North	Keith Edward Parker	Progressive Conservative	1982	1st term
Moose Jaw South	Arthur Leslie Smith	Progressive Conservative	1982	1st term
Moosomin	Larry Birkbeck	Progressive Conservative	1975	3rd term
Morse	Harold Martens	Progressive Conservative	1982	1st term
Nipawin	Lloyd David Sauder	Progressive Conservative	1982	1st term
Pelly	Norm Lusney	New Democratic Party	1977	3rd term
Prince Albert	John Paul Meagher	Progressive Conservative	1982	1st term
Prince Albert-Duck Lake	Jerome Hammersmith	New Democratic Party	1978	2nd term
Prince Albert-Duck Lake	Sid Dutchak (1983)	Progressive Conservative	1983	1st term
Qu'Appelle	John Gary Lane	Progressive Conservative	1971 (Note: First elected as a Liberal)	4th term
Quill Lakes	Murray James Koskie	New Democratic Party	1975	3rd term
Redberry	John Eudore Gerich	Progressive Conservative	1982	1st term
Regina Centre	Edward Blain Shillington	New Democratic Party	1975	3rd term
Regina Elphinstone	Allan Emrys Blakeney	New Democratic Party	1960	7th term
Regina Lakeview	Tim Embury	Progressive Conservative	1982	1st term
Regina North	Jack Charles Klein	Progressive Conservative	1982	1st term
Regina North East	Russell Allan Sutor	Progressive Conservative	1982	1st term
Regina North East	Edwin Laurence Tchorzewski (1985)	New Democratic Party	1971, (Note: Humboldt) 1985	4th term*
Regina North West	William Martin Sveinson	Progressive Conservative	1982	1st term
Regina North West	William Martin Sveinson	Liberal	1982	1st term
Regina North West	William Martin Sveinson	Independent	1982	1st term
Regina North West	William Martin Sveinson	Western Canada Concept	1982	1st term
Regina North West	William Martin Sveinson	Independent	1982	1st term
Regina Rosemont	Gordon Dirks	Progressive Conservative	1982	1st term
Regina South	Paul Emile Rousseau	Progressive Conservative	1978	2nd term
Regina Victoria	Metro Carl Rybchuk	Progressive Conservative	1982	1st term
Regina Wascana	Gordon Gray Currie	Progressive Conservative	1982	1st term
Rosetown-Elrose	Herbert Swan	Progressive Conservative	1978	2nd term
Rosthern	Ralph Katzman	Progressive Conservative	1975	3rd term
Saltcoats	Walter Robert Johnson	Progressive Conservative	1982	1st term
Saskatoon Centre	Jack Sven Sandberg	Progressive Conservative	1982	1st term
Saskatoon Eastview	Kimberly John Young	Progressive Conservative	1982	1st term
Saskatoon Fairview	Duane Raymond William Edward Weiman	Progressive Conservative	1982	1st term
Saskatoon Mayfair	Calvin Henry Glauser	Progressive Conservative	1982	1st term
Saskatoon Nutana	Evelyn Louise Bacon	Progressive Conservative	1982	1st term
Saskatoon Riversdale	Jo Ann Zazelenchuk	Progressive Conservative	1982	1st term
Saskatoon South	Robert Edward William Myers	Progressive Conservative	1982	1st term
Saskatoon Sutherland	Paul John Schoenhals	Progressive Conservative	1982	1st term
Saskatoon University	Richard Dale Folk	Progressive Conservative	1982	1st term
Saskatoon Westmount	Gay White Caswell	Progressive Conservative	1982	1st term
Shaunavon	Dwain Matthew Lingenfelter	New Democratic Party	1978	2nd term
Shellbrook-Torch River	Lloyd John Muller	Progressive Conservative	1982	1st term
Souris-Cannington	Eric Arthur Berntson	Progressive Conservative	1975	3rd term
Swift Current	Patricia Anne Smith	Progressive Conservative	1982	1st term
The Battlefords	Myles Leslie Morin	Progressive Conservative	1982	1st term
Thunder Creek (Note: Seat declared vacant)	Wilbert Colin Thatcher	Progressive Conservative	1975	3rd term
Thunder Creek	Richard James Swenson (1985)	Progressive Conservative	1985	1st term
Turtleford	Colin Maxwell	Progressive Conservative	1982	1st term
Weyburn	Lorne Henry Hepworth	Progressive Conservative	1982	1st term
Wilkie	James William Arthur Garner	Progressive Conservative	1978	2nd term
Yorkton	Lorne A. McLaren	Progressive Conservative	1982	1st term

== Party Standings ==
Affiliation	Members
Progressive Conservative	55
New Democratic Party	9
Total	64
Government Majority	46

== By-elections ==
By-elections were held to replace members for various reasons:

Electoral district	Member elected	Party	Election date	Reason
Prince Albert-Duck Lake	Sid Dutchak	Progressive Conservative	February 21, 1983	Election results declared void
Thunder Creek	Richard James Swenson	Progressive Conservative	March 27, 1985	Seat declared vacant; C Thatcher convicted of killing his wife
Regina North East	Edwin Laurence Tchorzewski	New Democratic Party	November 25, 1985	RA Sutor resigned for personal business reasons
