= 1982 Saskatchewan general election =

Canadian provincial election

- April 26, 1982

64 seats in the Legislative Assembly of Saskatchewan 33 seats needed for a majority
- Turnout: 83.9%
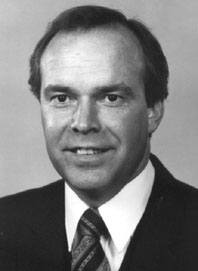

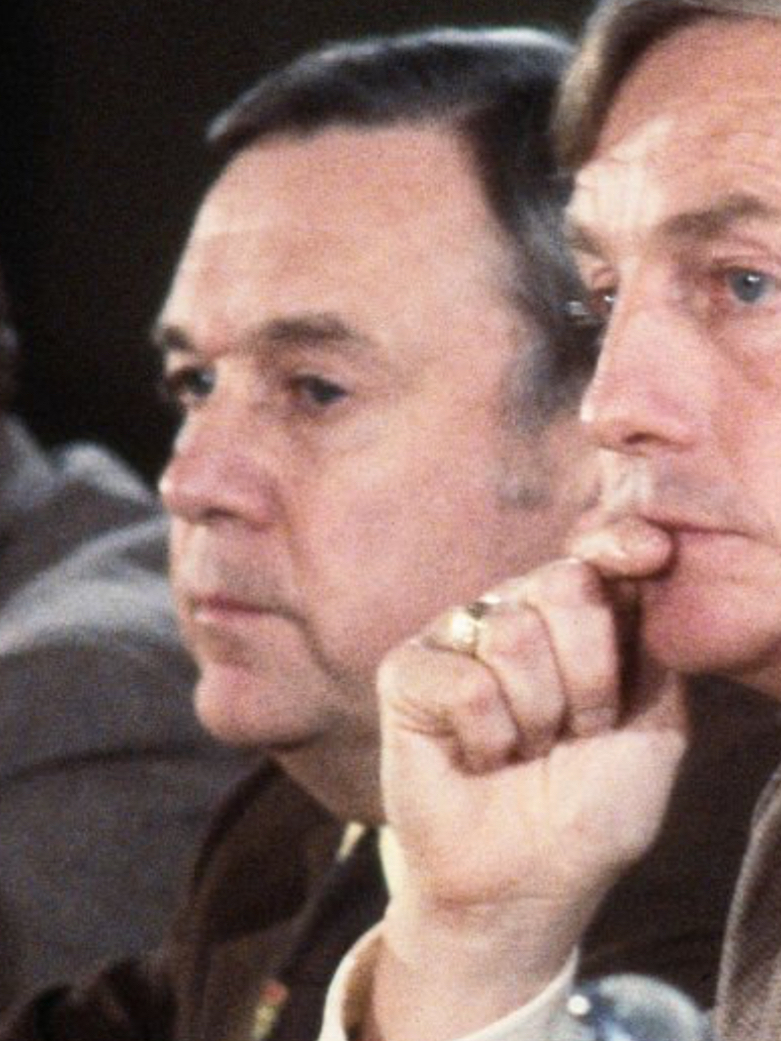
	First party	Second party
Leader	Grant Devine	Allan Blakeney
Party	Progressive Conservative	New Democratic
Leader since	November 9, 1979	July 4, 1970
Leader's seat	Estevan	Regina Elphinstone
Last election	17	44
Seats before	15	44
Seats won	55	9
Seat change	▲40	▼35
Popular vote	289,311	201,390
Percentage	54.07%	37.64%
Swing	▲15.99pp	▼10.44pp
Premier before election
Allan Blakeney
New Democratic
Premier after election
Grant Devine
Progressive Conservative

The 1982 Saskatchewan general election was held on April 26, 1982, to elect members of the Legislative Assembly of Saskatchewan.

The Progressive Conservative Party, led by Grant Devine, defeated the New Democratic Party government of Premier Allan Blakeney, which had governed the province since the 1971 election. The Tories won over half the popular vote, and a large majority in the legislature – the first time that the party had won an outright majority, and making Devine only the second Tory premier in the province's history. The only other time that the Tories had ever led a government was after the 1929 election, when James Anderson led a coalition government of Conservatives, Progressives and independents.

The NDP vote fell to its lowest level since 1938, and the party lost 35 of its 44 seats in the legislature – the second-worst defeat of a sitting government in the province's history, behind only the Saskatchewan Liberal Party's 38-seat loss in 1944. The highest-profile casualty was Deputy Premier Roy Romanow, who was ousted by Tory challenger Jo-Ann Zazelenchuk as part of the Tories' sweep of Saskatoon.

This election included the Aboriginal People's Party, a party focused on issues affecting Saskatchewan's First Nations. The APP's best showing would be in the Cumberland district of northeast Saskatchewan, finishing third – ahead of the Liberal candidate.

Popular feelings of alienation in Saskatchewan from Ottawa reached a high point in 1982. The provincial wing of the Western Canada Concept movement won more votes than the Saskatchewan Liberal Party candidate in over a third of Saskatchewan's constituencies; in three ridings the WCC candidate captured more than 1,000 votes. The WCC would disappear by 1988, and be replaced by the Western Independence Party, and later the Buffalo Party, in the 21st century.

== Results ==
Party	Party leader	Candidates	Seats				Popular vote		
Party	Party leader	Candidates	1978	Dissol.	Elected	% Change	#	%	% Change
Progressive Conservative	Grant Devine	64	17	15	55	+266.7%	289,311	54.07%	+15.99%
New Democratic	Allan Blakeney	64	44	44	9	-79.5%	201,390	37.64%	-10.44%
Liberal	Ralph Goodale	64	–	–	–	–	24,134	4.51%	-9.27%
Western Canada Concept	Ray Bailey	40	*	*	–	*	17,487	3.26%	*
Independent		8	–	2^{1}	–	-100%	1,607	0.30%	+0.28%
Aboriginal People's		10	*	*	–	*	1,156	0.22%	*
Total		250	61	61	64	+4.9%	535,085	100%	
Source: Elections Saskatchewan

Note: * Party did not nominate candidates in previous election. ^{1}Richard Collver and Dennis Ham, MLAs of the short-lived "Unionest Party".

=== Percentages ===
Popular vote
PC	54.07%
New Democratic	37.64%
Liberal	4.51%
WCC	3.26%
Others	0.52%

Seats summary
PC	85.94%
New Democratic	14.06%

=== Ranking ===
Party	Seats	Second	Third	Fourth	Fifth
Progressive Conservative	55	8	1	0	0
New Democratic	9	55	0	0	0
Liberal	0	1	38	26	1
Western Canada Concept	0	0	23	16	1
Aboriginal People's	0	0	1	2	7
Independent	0	0	1	2	5

== Riding results ==
Names in bold represent cabinet ministers and the Speaker. Party leaders are italicized. The symbol " ** " indicates MLAs who are not running again.

=== Northwest Saskatchewan ===
Electoral District	Candidates					Incumbent
Electoral District	Progressive Conservative	New Democratic	Liberal	Western Canada Concept	Other	Incumbent
Athabasca	Bruce Clarke; 1,162	Frederick John Thompson; 1,606	Willard Quewezance; 147		Rod Bishop (Ind.) 976 Vital Morin (APP) 210	Frederick John Thompson
Cut Knife-Lloydminster	Michael Hopfner; 4,968	Bob Long; 3,963	L. Allison Henderson; 109			Robert Gavin Long
Meadow Lake	George McLeod; 4,236	Dave Bridger; 2,149	R. Hugh Currie; 131	Paul S. Pospisil; 242	Ray L. Manegre (Ind.) 57	George Malcolm McLeod
Redberry	John Gerich; 4,018	Dennis Banda; 2,556	Bernadine Droesse; 156	Wayne Ratzlaff; 303		Dennis George Banda
Rosthern	Ralph Katzman; 6,816	Chris Banman; 1,889	Bruce Wagner; 412		James E. Boschman (Ind.) 188	Ralph Katzman
The Battlefords	Myles Morin; 5,737	David Miner; 3,625	Mary Friedman; 348	Vernon D. Loeppky; 249		David Manly Miner
Turtleford	Colin Maxwell; 3,825	Lloyd Johnson; 2,803	Glenn J. Mason; 155			Lloyd Emmett Johnson

=== Northeast Saskatchewan ===
Electoral District	Candidates					Incumbent
Electoral District	Progressive Conservative	New Democratic	Liberal	Western Canada Concept	Aboriginal People's Party	Incumbent
Cumberland	Edward Charlette; 852	Lawrence Riel Yew; 2,587	Roy Fosseneuve; 251		Leon E. McAuley; 329	Norm MacAulay**
Kelsey-Tisdale	Neal Hardy; 5,171	Francis E. Schmeichel; 2,874	P. Hudson Foga; 139	John K. McConaghie; 284	Olga Flesjer; 32	Neal Herbert Hardy
Kinistino	Bernard Boutin; 4,266	Don Cody; 3,759	Ed Olchowy; 247			Donald William Cody
Melfort	Grant Hodgins; 4,626	Norm Vickar; 3,099	S. Helen Hamilton; 130	Brian Bedard; 489		Norman Vickar
Nipawin	Lloyd Sauder; 4,267	Irvin G. Perkins; 2,844	Ron J. Wassill; 231	Bob Fair; 627		Richard Collver**
Prince Albert	John Meagher; 4,258	Mike Feschuk; 4,232	Bill Nutting; 369	Earl Switenky; 764		Mike Feschuk
Prince Albert-Duck Lake	Phil West; 3,491	Jerome Hammersmith; 3,500	Mike Scholfield; 404	Ron Folstad; 873	John H. McLeod; 86	Jerome Hammersmith
Shellbrook-Torch River	Lloyd Muller; 4,117	George Bowerman; 3,274	Jack Greening; 287	Stanley Stefanski; 667	Garry Standing; 65	George Bowerman; Shellbrook

February 21, 1983 By-election: Prince Albert-Duck Lake
Party	Candidate	Votes	%	±%
Prog. Conservative	Sid Dutchak	4,271	55.78%	+13.99
NDP	Jerome Hammersmith	3,386	44.22%	+2.32
Total		7,657	100.00	

=== West Central Saskatchewan ===
Electoral District	Candidates				Incumbent
Electoral District	Progressive Conservative	New Democratic	Liberal	Western Canada Concept	Incumbent
Arm River	Gerald Muirhead; 5,608	Donald Leonard Faris; 2,719	Marjorie Towstego; 118	Jim Cross; 339	Gerald Muirhead
Biggar	Harry Baker; 4,437	Elwood Lorrie Cowley; 3,070	Neil Vander Nagel; 141	Roland Chouinard; 327	Elwood Lorrie Cowley
Humboldt	Louis Domotor; 4,480	Edwin Tchorzewski; 3,946	Ligouri LeBlanc; 361	Glen Strueby; 168	Edwin Tchorzewski
Kindersley	Robert Andrew; 5,211	Wayne Nargang; 1,833	Wayne Mah; 166	Chuck McIntyre; 454	Robert Lynal Andrew
Rosetown-Elrose	**Herbert Swan**; 4,802	Jim Mills; 2,327	David Herle; 166	Dale Skelton; 666	Herbert Junior Swan
Wilkie	James Garner; 5,056	Wayne Birn; 2,039	Arthur Reil; 502		James W.A. Garner

=== East Central Saskatchewan ===
Electoral District	Candidates					Incumbent
Electoral District	Progressive Conservative	New Democratic	Liberal	Western Canada Concept	Aboriginal People's Party	Incumbent
Canora	Lloyd Hampton; 4,398	Gerard Pikula; 3,520	Michael Okrainetz; 312			Al Matsalla**
Kelvington-Wadena	Sherwin Petersen; 4,330	Neil Byers; 3,755	Ben Ferrie; 215			Neil Byers
Last Mountain-Touchwood	Arnold Tusa; 4,588	Gordon MacMurchy; 4,059	Charles Schuler 165	Jack McMunn; 218		Gordon MacMurchy
Melville	Grant Schmidt; 4,172	Pat Krug; 3,486	Jack Hanowski; 627	Ray Miller; 421	Harry Bird; 64	John Russell Kowalchuk**
Pelly	Mervyn Abrahamson; 3,179	Norm Lusney; 3,381	Tom Campbell; 476			Norm Lusney
Quill Lakes	Ray Berscheid; 3,892	Murray Koskie; 3,945	Walter Paulson; 448			Murray J. Koskie
Saltcoats	Walt Johnson; 3,921	Ed Kaeding; 3,531	James Coueslan; 416			Ed Kaeding
Yorkton	Lorne McLaren; 5,487	Randy Nelson; 3,727	Joseph Matsalla; 252	Ted Yascheshen; 194		Randall Neil Nelson

=== Southwest Saskatchewan ===
Electoral District	Candidates				Incumbent
Electoral District	Progressive Conservative	New Democratic	Liberal	Western Canada Concept	Incumbent
Assiniboia-Gravelbourg	Rene Archambault; 2,438	Allen Engel; 2,875	Ralph Goodale; 2,760	Hugh Clarke; 459	Allen Engel
Maple Creek	Joan Duncan; 4,228	J.R. Porter; 2,158	Bernie Ford; 422	Larry English; 806	Joan Duncan
Moose Jaw North	Keith Parker; 5,859	Glenn Hagel; 3,895	Terrance Ocrane; 361	Colin Campbell; 256	John Skoberg**
Moose Jaw South	Arthur "Bud" Smith; 4,110	Gordon Snyder; 3,908	Bob Halter; 328	Jack Ashton; 275	Gordon Taylor Snyder
Morse	Art Martens; 3,565	Reg Gross; 2,409	Don Meyer; 277	Ray L. Bailey; 887	Reginald John Gross
Shaunavon	John Bleackley; 2,730	Dwain Lingenfelter; 2,897	Gratton Murray; 745	Barry W. Dixon; 1,139	Dwain Lingenfelter
Swift Current	Patricia Anne Smith; 4,756	Spencer Wooff; 2,941	Anna Patricia White; 316	Henry Banman; 787	Dennis Ham**
Thunder Creek	Colin Thatcher; 4,412	Ron Kurtz; 2,036	Gary Sherlock; 264	Pat Mullin; 442	Colin Thatcher

March 27, 1985 By-election: Thunder Creek
Party	Candidate	Votes	%	±%
Prog. Conservative	Richard Swenson	2,670	42.49%	-19.18
NDP	Betty Payne	1,730	27.53%	-0.93
Liberal	William Johnstone	1,703	27.10%	+23.41
WCC	Henry Banman	181	2.88%	-3.30
Total		6,284	100.00	

=== Southeast Saskatchewan ===
Electoral District	Candidates				Incumbent
Electoral District	Progressive Conservative	New Democratic	Liberal	Western Canada Concept	Incumbent
Bengough-Milestone	Bob Pickering; 4,571	Jim Liggett; 2,653	Tim Maloney; 420		Robert Hugh Pickering
Estevan	**Grant Devine**; 5,487	John Chapman; 2,947	Heather MacDonald-Doyle; 649	Vernon McClement; 184	John Chapman
Indian Head-Wolseley	Doug Taylor; 4,251	Pat Connolley; 2,073	Con Lalonde; 571	John Parley; 554	Douglas Graham Taylor
Moosomin	Larry Birkbeck; 4,165	Fred Easton; 2,476	Peter Semchuk; 250	Don Donaldson; 1,311	Larry Birkbeck
Qu’Appelle-Lumsden	John Gary Lane; 5,643	Tom Usherwood; 2,372	Cheryl Stadnyk; 219	Allan Smith; 346	John Gary Lane; Qu’Appelle
Souris-Cannington	Eric Berntson; 4,093	Dean Fraser; 1,639	William Owens; 437	Dale Nolin; 1,082	Eric Berntson
Weyburn	Lorne Hepworth; 5,426	Elaine Driver; 3,088	David Wright; 422		James Auburn Pepper**

=== Saskatoon ===
Electoral District	Candidates						Incumbent
Electoral District	Progressive Conservative	New Democratic	Liberal	Western Canada Concept	Aboriginal People's Party	Other	Incumbent
Saskatoon Centre	Jack Sandberg; 3,553	Paul Mostoway; 2,987	Delores Burkhart; 470				Paul Peter Mostoway
Saskatoon Eastview	Kimberly Young; 6,981	Bernie Poniatowski; 3,736	David Jackson; 688				Bernard Poniatowski
Saskatoon Fairview	Duane Weiman; 6,185	Bob Mitchell; 3,432	David Schwartz; 181	Brian Bellamy; 200	John Dorion; 48		New District
Saskatoon Mayfair	Cal Glauser; 7,386	Dave Whalley; 3,777	Maureen Darling; 441	Don Kavanaugh; 186			Beverly Milton Dyck**
Saskatoon Nutana	Evelyn Bacon; 3,685	Pat Atkinson; 3,580	David Tunney; 492				Wes Robbins**
Saskatoon Riversdale	Jo-Ann Zazelenchuk; 3,576	Roy Romanow; 3,557	Harold Flett; 228		Joe Gallagher; 143	Alexander Barker (Ind.) 57	Roy Romanow
Saskatoon South	Bob Myers; 4,611	Herman Rolfes; 3,221	Don McCullough; 422	Reid Schmidt; 90		Carol Stadnyk (Ind.) 118	Herman Harold Rolfes; Saskatoon Buena Vista
Saskatoon Sutherland	Paul Schoenhals; 5,328	Mark Koenker; 3,026	Ron Hannah; 374	Gordon Barnes; 116	Cecil King; 43		Peter Prebble
Saskatoon University	Rick Folk; 3,490	Peter Prebble; 3,041	David B. Miller; 718	Earl A. Cowley; 104		Alphard Fafard (Not affiliated) 28	New District
Saskatoon Westmount	Gay Caswell; 3,716	**John Edward Brockelbank**; 3,583	Peter Groves; 288		Freda Moosehunter; 136		John Edward Brockelbank

=== Regina ===
Electoral District	Candidates					Incumbent
Electoral District	Progressive Conservative	New Democratic	Liberal	Western Canada Concept	Other	Incumbent
Regina Centre	Jim Petrychyn; 2,570	Ned Shillington; 3,821	Cam McCannell; 691	Tyler Benson; 165	Gordon Massie (Not affiliated) 66	Edward Shillington
Regina Elphinstone	Ross Reibling; 3,066	**Allan Blakeney**; 4,139	Glenn Caleval; 255			Allan Blakeney
Regina Lakeview	Tim Embury; 4,688	Doug McArthur; 3,808	Delores Honour; 520			Douglas Francis McArthur
Regina North	Jack Klein; 5,845	Stan Oxelgren; 3,715	Daryl Boychuk; 239			New District
Regina North East	Russ Sutor; 5,303	Walt Smishek; 3,559	Robert Dall'Olio; 178	Ron J. Blashill; 201		Walter Smishek
Regina North West	Bill Sveinson; 6,797	John Solomon; 4,509	Adrian McBride; 245	Les R. Kavanaugh; 222		John Solomon
Regina Rosemont	Gordon Dirks; 5,271	Bill Allen; 3,673	Ken M. Grotsky; 210	Stewart Coward; 206		Bill Allen
Regina South	Paul Rousseau; 6,088	Margaret Fern; 2,869	Lori Stinson; 286			Paul Emile Rousseau
Regina Victoria	Metro Rybchuk; 4,108	Henry Baker; 3,512	Steve Bata; 335	Barbara Duff; 184	Jim Harding (Ind.) 117	Henry Harold Peter Baker
Regina Wascana	Gord Currie; 5,976	Clint White; 3,434	Marlene Lamontagne; 483			Clinton Oliver White

November 25, 1985 By-election: Regina North East
Party	Candidate	Votes	%	±%
NDP	Edwin Tchorzewski	5,377	70.97%	+32.46
Prog. Conservative	Wilma Staff	1,768	23.34%	-34.05
Liberal	Harvey Schick	431	5.69%	+3.76
Total		7,576	100.00	

== See also ==
- List of political parties in Saskatchewan
- List of Saskatchewan provincial electoral districts
- Saskatchewan Archives Board - Election Results By Electoral Division
- Elections Saskatchewan: Provincial Vote Summaries
