= Roy Romanow =

12th Premier of Saskatchewan (1991–2001)

The Honourable Roy Romanow PC OC ECS SOM KC
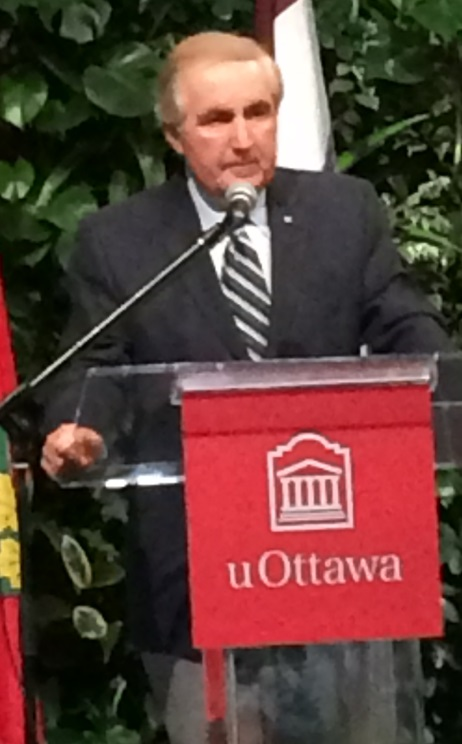
- Romanow in 2015, at the University of Ottawa

12th Premier of Saskatchewan
- In office November 1, 1991 – February 8, 2001
- Monarch: Elizabeth II
- Lieutenant Governor: Sylvia Fedoruk; Jack Wiebe; Lynda Haverstock
- Preceded by: Grant Devine
- Succeeded by: Lorne Calvert

Chair of the Royal Commission on the Future of Health Care in Canada
- In office April 2001 – November 2002
- Prime Minister: Jean Chrétien

Saskatchewan Leader of the Opposition
- In office November 7, 1987 – November 1, 1991
- Preceded by: Allan Blakeney
- Succeeded by: Grant Devine

3rd Leader of the Saskatchewan New Democratic Party
- In office November 7, 1987 – January 27, 2001
- Preceded by: Allan Blakeney
- Succeeded by: Lorne Calvert

Deputy Premier of Saskatchewan
- In office June 30, 1971 – May 8, 1982
- Premier: Allan Blakeney
- Succeeded by: Eric Berntson

Saskatchewan Minister of Intergovernmental Affairs
- In office June 19, 1979 – May 8, 1982
- Premier: Allan Blakeney
- Preceded by: new office
- Succeeded by: John Gary Lane

Attorney General of Saskatchewan
- In office June 30, 1971 – May 8, 1982
- Premier: Allan Blakeney
- Preceded by: Darrel Verner Heald
- Succeeded by: John Gary Lane

Provincial Secretary of Saskatchewan
- In office June 30, 1971 – May 12, 1972
- Premier: Allan Blakeney
- Preceded by: Darrel Verner Heald
- Succeeded by: Edwin Tchorzewski

Member of the Legislative Assembly of Saskatchewan
- In office October 11, 1967 – April 26, 1982
- Preceded by: New Riding
- Succeeded by: Jo-Ann Zazelenchuk
- Constituency: Saskatoon Riversdale
- In office October 20, 1986 – February 8, 2001
- Preceded by: Jo-Ann Zazelenchuk
- Succeeded by: Lorne Calvert
- Constituency: Saskatoon Riversdale

Personal details
- Born: Roy John Romanow; August 12, 1939 (age 87) Saskatoon, Saskatchewan
- Party: New Democratic Party
- Education: University of Saskatchewan
- Profession: Lawyer

Roy John Romanow PC OC SOM KC (born August 12, 1939) is a Canadian politician who served as the 12th premier of Saskatchewan from 1991 to 2001. He was the leader of the Saskatchewan New Democratic Party from 1987 until his retirement in 2001. He was the Member of the Legislative Assembly for Saskatoon Riversdale from 1967 to 1982 and from 1986 to 2001.

Romanow played a prominent role in Allan Blakeney's NDP government from 1971 to 1982, particularly in negotiations over Patriation of the Canadian Constitution. He became the Leader of the Opposition in 1987 before leading the NDP to three consecutive election victories in the 1990s. His time as premier left a divisive legacy within Saskatchewan's political history. When Romanow first took office, Saskatchewan was facing the prospect of bankruptcy. His fiscal management brought the province back to balanced finances by the middle of the decade. However, his embrace of Third Way neoliberal politics disillusioned many within the NDP. Moreover, the perception that his cuts to spending disproportionately impacted rural Saskatchewan deepened an already growing divide between urban and rural issues and voters in the province, which factored prominently into future elections.

== Early life ==
Romanow was born in Saskatoon, Saskatchewan, in 1939 to Tekla and Michael Romanow, who were Ukrainian immigrants from Ordiv—currently Chervonohrad Raion—Ukraine. His first language was Ukrainian.

He studied at the University of Saskatchewan, earning bachelor's degrees in Political science in 1960 and Law in 1964 while involving himself heavily in student politics—he served a year as president of the Students' Representative Council. Romanow then practiced law, articling with and joining Goldenburg, Taylor and Company in Saskatoon. He married Eleanore Boykowich in 1967.

== Early political career (1967–1982) ==
=== MLA and NDP leadership bid ===
Romanow was first elected to the Legislative Assembly of Saskatchewan as a member of the CCF-NDP in the 1967 provincial election in the riding of Saskatoon Riversdale; the election was won by Ross Thatcher's Liberals. When Woodrow Lloyd resigned as party leader in 1970, the young Romanow entered the leadership election to succeed him as leader of the NDP. Romanow was considered the most conservative of four candidates as he was joined by Allan Blakeney, a veteran civil servant and MLA in the governments of Lloyd and Tommy Douglas; Don Mitchell, an agrarian activist who represented the socialist Waffle faction of the party; and George Taylor, a labour candidate. Romanow led narrowly on the first and second ballots. The delegated election came down to a final ballot featuring Romanow and Blakeney, and Blakeney won with 54% of the vote.

=== Blakeney government ===
Romanow was re-elected in the 1971 provincial election, which resulted in a majority government for Blakeney and the NDP. Blakeney immediately offered his former leadership rival prominent cabinet posts—Romanow served as Attorney General and Deputy Premier for Blakeney's entire tenure as premier, from 1971 to 1982. This meant Romanow played a role in many of the key achievements of the NDP in this era, including the nationalization of the potash industry and battles with the federal government over resource rights and taxation, as well as Patriation of the Constitution.

During the 1981 discussions over Patriation of the Constitution, federal Minister of Justice Jean Chrétien, Ontario Attorney General Roy McMurtry, Romanow, and Saskatchewan's director of constitutional law, John Whyte, worked out the final details of Canada's new constitutional provisions, resulting in the late-night Kitchen Accord. Romanow objected strongly to any protections on private property in the new Canadian Charter of Rights and Freedoms, and none were included.

After three consecutive majority governments, Blakeney's NDP were swept from power in the 1982 election in a shocking upset by Grant Devine's Progressive Conservatives. Romanow himself was upset in Saskatoon Centre, losing to 23-year-old PC candidate Jo-Ann Zazelenchuk by 19 votes.

== Late political career (1986–2001) ==
=== Return and Opposition Leader (1986–1991) ===
Romanow ran to reclaim his seat from Zazelenchuk in the 1986 election, and he won with nearly 70% of the vote. The NDP largely rebounded in 1986, narrowly winning the popular vote, but Devine's PCs secured a second majority government with a particularly strong performance in rural Saskatchewan. The result led Blakeney, who had stayed on as Opposition leader after the loss in 1982, to resign as party leader. Romanow ran to succeed Blakeney, and with no challengers was acclaimed the new NDP leader—and leader of the Opposition—on November 7, 1987.

It became clear during the PCs second term that the province's finances were in dire straits. The PCs ran a succession of large budget deficits, which peaked in 1986–87 at $1.2 billion, rapidly increasing the provincial debt. Devine used the fiscal situation as justification to pursue the privatization of a wide range of crown corporations—including PotashCorp, one of the key achievements of the Blakeney era—which engendered fierce opposition from the NDP. The situation came to a head in 1989 when the government moved to privatize SaskEnergy, the natural gas division of SaskPower; in response, Romanow led a legislative walk-out of the Opposition, effectively bringing government business to a halt. After 17 days, the government relented and ended the sell-off of SaskEnergy. When legislation to privatize PotashCorp was introduced later in 1989, the NDP, buoyed by its success with SaskEnergy, remained in the Legislature, ready to debate the legislation; however, the PCs enacted closure for the first time in provincial history to avoid debate on the issue and move forward with the legislation with no public scrutiny. The PCs were persistently criticized late in their term for undemocratic tactics including prorogation of the Legislature and the dubious use of special warrants for spending.

Devine's PCs, which were clearly deeply unpopular, put off the next election as long as legally possible. When it finally occurred, Romanow led the NDP to a landslide majority government in the 1991 provincial election, winning 55 out of 66 seats, making Romanow Premier.

=== Premier of Saskatchewan (1991–2001) ===
When Romanow assumed office in 1991, the extent of the fiscal crisis facing the province began to become clearer. The provincial debt had reached nearly $15 billion under the Progressive Conservatives, and the province was facing the prospect of bankruptcy; interest payments on debt alone were accounting for more than 20% of government spending, second only to healthcare. Romanow had campaigned on getting the province's fiscal house back in order, and dealing with the fiscal crisis became his government's top priority.

==== Economic policy ====
In justifying his prioritization of the fiscal crisis, Romanow appealed to the previous CCF/NDP regimes of Blakeney and Tommy Douglas who, despite increasing the size and role of the government and its spending, prioritized sound fiscal management and balanced budgets. However, in their approach to dealing with the crisis, Romanow and finance minister Janice MacKinnon practiced austerity, greatly reducing government spending by downsizing the government and cutting services. They cited pressure from bondholders and a lack of assistance from the federal government as factors that increased the pressure to drastically reduce spending. Some of the most controversial cuts including reforming provincial health care—replacing more than one hundred hospital boards with approximately thirty health regions, and ending acute-care in more than fifty rural hospitals—and ending the Gross Revenue Insurance Plan, which had directly supported crop farm incomes. Such cuts were seen as disproportionately targeting rural life in the province. Moreover, Romanow's governments adopted some of the same tactics the PCs had introduced to pass legislation, including closure when it came to their health care reforms. The cuts to programs and services in rural Saskatchewan were deeply unpopular and would prove costly to the NDP in those regions. However, such measures did lead to a balanced budget by 1995, sooner than had been expected and effectively ending concerns about the fiscal crisis. After 1995, Romanow's government ran successive surpluses and paid the debt down to approximately $10 billion.

==== Re-elections and retirement ====
Romanow led the NDP to a second majority in the 1995 provincial election. The PCs were reduced to third-party status amid revelations of a major expense fraud scandal stemming from their last term in government, while the Liberals under Lynda Haverstock surged to Opposition status. However, the NDP's seemingly solid grip on government and the growing frustrations of rural regions provided an impetus for a reorganization of conservatives in the province. In 1997, working behind the scenes with members of the federal Reform Party, four PC MLAs, including new leader Bill Boyd, and four Liberal MLAs—all from rural ridings—walked away from their parties and established the Saskatchewan Party. With eight MLAs, the new party immediately took over Opposition status. In 1998, it chose former Reform MP Elwin Hermanson as its first leader. Romanow framed the new party as an effort to rebrand the moribund Progressive Conservatives and took to referring to them as the "Saskatories".

The NDP were widely expected to secure another majority in the 1999 provincial election. The party was re-elected to a third consecutive term, but was in fact reduced to a minority of seats in the legislature, forcing Romanow to negotiate a coalition government with the Liberals, an agreement that resulted in appointing three Liberals to Cabinet. This was the result of a strong performance by Hermanson's party—which actually edged the NDP in the popular vote—in rural areas; the Saskatchewan Party won 25 seats, but none in either Regina or Saskatoon. Hermanson capitalized on rural discontent with the NDP, characterizing spending cuts there as the NDP's "rural revenge", putting into stark relief the growing divide between urban and rural voters in the province. Critics of Romanow's austerity politics pointed to declining party membership and voter engagement as troubling factors in the election.

In 2000, less than a year after the election, Romanow announced that he would be retiring as soon as a successor was chosen by the party. The announcement triggered a hotly contested leadership race with seven candidates—a far cry from Romanow's acclimation in 1987—with differing views for the future of the party. Anti-neoliberal candidate Nettie Wiebe placed third in the 2001 leadership vote, while Romanow's attorney general Chris Axworthy was defeated on the final ballot by former cabinet minister Lorne Calvert, who was sworn in as premier on February 8, 2001. Calvert had campaigned on the party's traditional social democratic values and a commitment to increase social spending. After Romanow's resignation, Calvert also succeeded him as MLA for Saskatoon Riversdale, winning the by-election there on March 19, 2001.

== Life after politics ==
=== Federal arena ===
Jean Chrétien's federal Liberal Party—a party with which Romanow had worked closely on Patriation in the early 1980s—encouraged Romanow to run for the party, but he declined. He stated that to do so would be a betrayal of the NDP, and he bargained instead for the opportunity to lead a Royal commission on the future of health care. Romanow ultimately got his wish, and on April 4, 2001, Romanow was appointed to head the Royal Commission on the Future of Health Care in Canada by Governor General Adrienne Clarkson, on the advice of Chrétien. The Romanow Report was released in 2002, outlining suggestions to improve the health care system. The Report urged the protection and strengthening of Canada's public health care system, calling for increased federal funding and a Health Charter outlining fundamental health care principles. The Report has remained influential in health care discussions for decades.

In 2003, Romanow was sworn in as a member of the Queen's Privy Council for Canada by Governor General Clarkson, again on the advice of Prime Minister Chrétien.

=== Academic positions and honours ===
After retiring from politics, Romanow became a senior policy fellow at the University of Saskatchewan and the University of Regina, as well as a visiting fellow at Queen's University. In 2016, he was named Chancellor of the University of Saskatchewan, a role he filled until the end of his term in 2019 when he remained a policy fellow at the university.

In 2003, Romanow was awarded the Saskatchewan Order of Merit, and in 2004 was made an Officer of the Order of Canada. Romanow's official portrait was unveiled at Saskatchewan's Legislative Assembly in 2005, when he received the Commemorative Medal for the Centennial of Saskatchewan from Lieutenant Governor Lynda Haverstock.

== Legacy ==
Romanow's tenure as premier left a divisive legacy. His government inherited a dire fiscal crisis, and their actions are credited with getting the province's finances back in order. However, the pace at which Romanow's government addressed the problem, and the economic austerity it implemented in order to do so, have been subject to debate. Critics from the traditional left wing of the NDP like John Conway and John Warnock, along with former leadership candidate Nettie Wiebe, charged Romanow with embracing neoliberalism and effectively betraying the NDP's social democratic tradition. Others have conceded that Romanow was more fiscally conservative than would be expected from an NDP leader, but have underscored his commitment to social democratic values. His approach preserved a large activist role for government as well as a social safety net and investments in health care and education. Howard Leeson, who worked with Romanow in the Blakeney government, wrote that Romanow had a "conservative approach to politics, tempered by a genuine concern for social needs", characterizing him as more of a "red tory" than a neoliberal. Other observers, like historian Bill Waiser and political analyst Dale Eisler, have argued that the globalized economy in which Romanow operated left fewer options than were available to his NDP predecessors, and drastic actions were necessary to deal with the crisis.

Ultimately, Romanow's embrace of Third Way politics signaled an entrenchment of neoliberal economics in the province. David McGrane concluded that, while Romanow's successor Lorne Calvert steered the NDP back further towards the left in terms of social policy, it effectively carried forward its economic legacy. Even the fledgling conservative Saskatchewan Party found little to criticize with NDP economic policy at the turn of the century, focusing its criticism on the NDP's "management style" rather than its economic ideology. The other lasting legacy of the Romanow era was a solidification of the rural-urban divide in Saskatchewan. That divide had been widened by the Devine Progressive Conservative government's rural emphasis; Romanow's austerity, which was seen as disproportionately impacting rural areas, heightened the polarization and made the NDP deeply unpopular there.

== Electoral record ==
Electoral history of NDP under Roy Romanow
Year	Party	Votes			Seats		Position
Year	Party	Total	%	±%	Total	±	Position
1991	NDP	275,780	51.1%	+5.9%	55 / 66	+29	Majority government
1995	NDP	193,053	47.2%	–3.8%	42 / 58	–12	Majority government
1999	NDP	157,046	38.7%	–8.5%	29 / 58	–14	Minority government

Constituency elections

1999 Saskatchewan general election: Saskatoon Riversdale
Party	Candidate	Votes	%
New Democratic	Roy Romanow	3,130	57.89
Saskatchewan	Mark Coderre	1,060	19.60
Liberal	David Pillipow	923	17.07
New Green	Neil Sinclair	167	3.09
Progressive Conservative	Glenn Schriener	127	2.35
Total valid votes		5,407	100.00
Source: Saskatchewan Archives - Election Results by Electoral Division

1995 Saskatchewan general election: Saskatoon Riversdale
Party	Candidate	Votes	%
New Democratic	Roy Romanow	3,715	68.18
Liberal	Fred Langford	1,242	22.79
Progressive Conservative	Jordon Cooper	412	7.56
Independent	Eugene Pasap	80	1.47
Total valid votes		5,449	100.00
Source: Saskatchewan Archives - Election Results by Electoral Division

1991 Saskatchewan general election: Saskatoon Riversdale
Party	Candidate	Votes	%
New Democratic	Roy Romanow	5,254	70.88
Liberal	Gary La Plante	1,398	18.86
Progressive Conservative	Gay Caswell	761	10.27
Total valid votes		7,413	100.00
Source: Saskatchewan Archives - Election Results by Electoral Division

1986 Saskatchewan general election: Saskatoon Riversdale
Party	Candidate	Votes	%
New Democratic	Roy Romanow	5,490	68.52
Progressive Conservative	Jo-Ann Zazelenchuk	2,114	26.36
Liberal	Bernadine Droesse	408	5.09
Total valid votes		8,012	100.00
Source: Saskatchewan Archives - Election Results by Electoral Division

1982 Saskatchewan general election: Saskatoon Riversdale
Party	Candidate	Votes	%
Progressive Conservative	Jo-Ann Zazelenchuk	3,576	47.30
New Democratic	Roy Romanow	3,557	47.04
Liberal	Harold Flett	228	3.02
Aboriginal People's	Joe Gallagher	143	1.89
Independent	Alexander V. Barker	57	0.75
Total valid votes		7,561	100.00
Source: Saskatchewan Archives - Election Results by Electoral Division

1978 Saskatchewan general election: Saskatoon Riversdale
Party	Candidate	Votes	%
New Democratic	Roy Romanow	5,225	64.75
Progressive Conservative	Mary Cherneskey	2,205	27.32
Liberal	Nestor W. Romaniuk	640	7.93
Total valid votes		8,070	100.00
Source: Saskatchewan Archives - Election Results by Electoral Division

1975 Saskatchewan general election: Saskatoon Riversdale
Party	Candidate	Votes	%
New Democratic	Roy Romanow	4,172	62.42
Progressive Conservative	Gary Barnes	1,551	23.20
Liberal	William Stadnyk	961	14.38
Total valid votes		6,684	100.00
Source: Saskatchewan Archives - Election Results by Electoral Division

1971 Saskatchewan general election: Saskatoon Riversdale
Party	Candidate	Votes	%
New Democratic	Roy Romanow	9,104	76.79
Liberal	James F. Weber	2,751	23.21
Total valid votes		11,855	100.00
Source: Saskatchewan Archives - Election Results by Electoral Division

1967 Saskatchewan general election: Saskatoon Riversdale
Party	Candidate	Votes	%
New Democratic	Roy Romanow	4,888	58.36
Liberal	Margaret Gent	2,327	27.79
Progressive Conservative	Emanuel Sonnenschein	1,160	13.85
Total valid votes		8,375	100.00
Source: Saskatchewan Archives - Election Results by Electoral Division

== See also ==
- List of premiers of Saskatchewan
