= Herman Rolfes =

Canadian politician

The Honourable Herman Harold Rolfes ECS

MLA for Saskatoon Nutana South
- In office 1971–1975
- Preceded by: William Forsyth
- Succeeded by: riding dissolved

MLA for Saskatoon Buena Vista
- In office 1975–1982
- Preceded by: first member
- Succeeded by: riding dissolved

MLA for Saskatoon South
- In office 1986–1991
- Preceded by: Robert Myers
- Succeeded by: riding dissolved

MLA for Saskatoon Nutana
- In office 1991–1995
- Preceded by: Pat Atkinson
- Succeeded by: Pat Atkinson

Speaker of the Legislative Assembly of Saskatchewan
- In office 1991–1995
- Preceded by: Arnold Tusa
- Succeeded by: Glenn Hagel

Personal details
- Born: July 13, 1936 (age 89) Annaheim, Saskatchewan
- Party: New Democratic Party of Saskatchewan

Herman Harold Rolfes (born July 13, 1936) was a Saskatchewan educator and politician who has held provincial office, as a former member of the Saskatchewan provincial legislature. He has won a number of significant recognized awards and honours over his lifetime career.

== Life before politics ==
The son of Joseph Rolfes and Josephine Heckmann, he was educated at St. Peter's College, at the Saskatoon Teacher's College and at the University of Saskatchewan. He served as principal for a number of elementary schools and as director of guidance for Holy Cross High School in Saskatoon. In 1961, Rolfes married Myrna Josephine Hopfner.

== Politics ==
Rolfes was a member of the Saskatchewan, Canada, branch of the Co-operative Commonwealth Federation (CCF), a social democratic political party, and its successor, the Saskatchewan New Democratic Party (NDP). He was elected Member of the Legislative Assembly in the Saskatoon Nutana South 1971 to 1975 term and served with Premier Allan Blakeney. Again he was elected for the Saskatoon Buena Vista electoral riding for the 1975 until 1978 when he was re-elected in the same riding again with Premier Allan Blakeney, NDP, and served until 1982. Under Allan Blakeney, NDP he was appointed Minister of Social Services, Minister of Continuing Education and finally as Minister of Health. 1982 when he was defeated, and Grant Devine, PC became the elected Premier. Herman Rolfes ran and won again in Saskatoon South in 1986 and 1991. Herman Harold Rolfes was Speaker of the Legislative Assembly of Saskatchewan or the presiding officer of the Saskatchewan legislature from 1991 to 1996.

Rolfes was a member of the Board of Governors for the University of Saskatchewan 1997-2003. Prior to his political career, he was a teacher in the Saskatchewan Catholic School system, elementary school principal and high school counsellor. He has also been a former appointed Saskatchewan Minister of Social Services, Saskatchewan Minister of Continuing Education, and Saskatchewan Minister of Health.
