= John Skoberg =

Canadian politician

John Leroy Skoberg

MP for Moose Jaw
- In office September 9, 1968 – September 1, 1972
- Preceded by: first member
- Succeeded by: Doug Neil

MLA for Moose Jaw North
- In office June 11, 1975 – April 26, 1982
- Preceded by: Donald MacDonald
- Succeeded by: Keith Parker

Personal details
- Born: February 2, 1926 Lougheed, Alberta
- Died: August 12, 2012 (aged 86) Cranbrook, British Columbia
- Party: New Democratic Party
- Occupation: railroad engineer

John Leroy Skoberg (February 2, 1926 – August 12, 2012) was a Canadian politician. A member of the New Democratic Party, he represented the electoral district of Moose Jaw in the House of Commons from 1968 to 1972, and Moose Jaw North in the Legislative Assembly of Saskatchewan from 1975 to 1982. He died aged 86 in 2012 of dementia.
