= Dmytro Lazorko =

Canadian politician

MLA for Redberry
- In office 1944–1948
- Preceded by: Orest Zerebko
- Succeeded by: Barry Korchinski

Personal details
- Born: November 8, 1908 Borden, Saskatchewan
- Died: April 15, 1982 (aged 73) Kuskanook, British Columbia
- Party: Co-operative Commonwealth Federation

Dmytro Matthew Lazorko (November 8, 1908 – April 15, 1982) was a farmer and political figure in Saskatchewan. He represented Redberry from 1944 to 1948 in the Legislative Assembly of Saskatchewan as a Co-operative Commonwealth Federation (CCF) member.

He was the son of Michael Lazorko and Annie Ruzesky, Ukrainian immigrants, and was educated in Borden, Saskatchewan. Lazorko went on to study agriculture at the University of Saskatchewan. In 1931, he married Anne Michalenko. He retired from farming in 1943 and moved to Borden, where he found work in a garage. He was a member of the United Farmers of Canada, a director for the Borden Co-op Association and secretary for the Concordia School. Lazorko also served on the town council for Borden. He was defeated when he ran for reelection to the provincial assembly in 1948. In 1963, he moved to Creston, British Columbia.
