= Clifford Honey Thurston =

Canadian politician and farmer

Clifford Honey Thurston (May 16, 1911 – 1992) was a farmer and political figure in Saskatchewan. He represented Lumsden from 1956 to 1964 in the Legislative Assembly of Saskatchewan as a Co-operative Commonwealth Federation (CCF) member.

Thurston was born in Drinkwater, Saskatchewan, the son of Charles William Thurston and Della Blanch Dorland, and was educated in Regina. In 1938, Thurston married Bernie Alberta Lear. He was defeated by Darrel Heald when he ran for reelection to the provincial assembly in 1964 and in 1967 and then again by John Gary Lane in 1971.
