= Saskatoon Nutana South =

Former provincial electoral district in Saskatchewan, Canada

Saskatchewan electoral district

Defunct provincial electoral district
- Legislature: Legislative Assembly of Saskatchewan
- District created: 1967
- District abolished: 1975
- First contested: 1967
- Last contested: 1975

Saskatoon Nutana South was a provincial electoral district for the Legislative Assembly of Saskatchewan, Canada. This district was located in the southeast corner of Saskatoon. It was created for the 16th Saskatchewan general election out of part of the five-seat Saskatoon City riding. It was abolished in 1975 into Saskatoon Buena Vista and Saskatoon Eastview.

== Members of the Legislative Assembly ==
Legislature	Years	Member	Party
Saskatoon Nutana South
16th	1967–1971	Bill Forsyth	Liberal
17th	1971–1975	Herman Rolfes	New Democrat

== Election results ==
1971 Saskatchewan general election: Saskatoon Nutana South
Party	Candidate	Votes	%	±%
NDP	Herman Rolfes	5,260	52.34	+17.56
Liberal	Bill Forsyth	4,789	47.66	-4.77
Total		10,049	100.00	

1967 Saskatchewan general election: Saskatoon Nutana South
Party	Candidate	Votes	%	±%
Liberal	Bill Forsyth	5,193	52.43	*
NDP	Adele Smillie	3,445	34.78	*
Prog. Conservative	Peter Ritchie	1,267	12.79	*
Total		9,905	100.00	

== See also ==
- List of Saskatchewan provincial electoral districts
- List of Saskatchewan general elections
- Canadian provincial electoral districts
