= Regina Wascana =

Former provincial electoral district in Saskatchewan, Canada

Created for the 16th Saskatchewan general election as "Regina South East", this constituency was redrawn and renamed Regina Wascana in 1971. It was dissolved in 1991.

== Members of the Legislative Assembly ==
Legislature	Years	Member	Party
Regina South East
16th	1967–1971	Henry Baker	New Democrat
Regina Wascana
17th	1971–1975	Henry Baker	New Democrat
18th	1975–1978	Anthony Merchant	Liberal
19th	1978–1982	Clint White	New Democrat
20th	1982–1986	Gord Currie	Progressive Conservative
21st	1986–1991	Gordon Martin	Progressive Conservative
Riding dissolved into Regina Hillsdale, Regina Victoria and Regina Wascana Plains

== Election results ==
1986 Saskatchewan general election: Regina Wascana
Party	Candidate	Votes	%	±%
Progressive Conservative	Gordon Martin	5,176	41.75	-18.66
NDP	Bob Goos	5,121	41.30	+6.59
Liberal	Cam McCannell	2,101	16.95	+12.07
Total		12,398	100.00	

1982 Saskatchewan general election: Regina Wascana
Party	Candidate	Votes	%	±%
Progressive Conservative	Gord Currie	5,976	60.41	+26.93
NDP	Clint White	3,434	34.71	-10.68
Liberal	Marlene Lamontagne	483	4.88	-16.25
Total		9,893	100.00	

1978 Saskatchewan general election: Regina Wascana
Party	Candidate	Votes	%	±%
NDP	Clint White	3,993	45.39	+13.71
Progressive Conservative	Allan W. Wagar	2,945	33.48	+12.65
Liberal	J. Duane Koch	1,859	21.13	-26.36
Total		8,797	100.00	

1975 Saskatchewan general election: Regina Wascana
Party	Candidate	Votes	%	±%
Liberal	Anthony Merchant	4,126	47.49	-0.71
NDP	Agnes Groome	2,752	31.68	-20.12
Prog. Conservative	Roy A. Rudichuk	1,810	20.83	-
Total		8,688	100.00	

1971 Saskatchewan general election: Regina Wascana
Party	Candidate	Votes	%	±%
NDP	Henry Baker	4,513	51.80	+3.69
Liberal	Harold Dietrich	4,199	48.20	+3.62
Total		8,712	100.00	

1967 Saskatchewan general election: Regina South East
Party	Candidate	Votes	%	±%
NDP	Henry Baker	5,893	48.11	*
Liberal	Paul Dojack	5,461	44.58	*
Prog. Conservative	Bill Barry	896	7.31	*
Total		12,250	100.00	

== See also ==
- List of Saskatchewan provincial electoral districts
- List of Saskatchewan general elections
- Canadian provincial electoral districts
