= Korchinski =

Surname list

Korchinski is the surname of the following people

- Bernard Leo Korchinski (1905-2006), Canadian politician in Saskatchewan
- Kevin Korchinski (born 2004), Canadian ice hockey player
- Stanley Korchinski (1929-2000), Canadian politician in Saskatchewan

== Other ==
- Death of Regis Korchinski-Paquet, Toronto Police case
