= Gary Lane =

Gary Lane may refer to:

- Gary Lane (chess player) (born 1964), professional chess player and author
- Gary Lane (gridiron football) (born 1942), American football quarterback and American football official
- Gary Lane (politician) (born 1942), Canadian politician and Saskatchewan MLA
