= Cathy Sproule =

Canadian politician

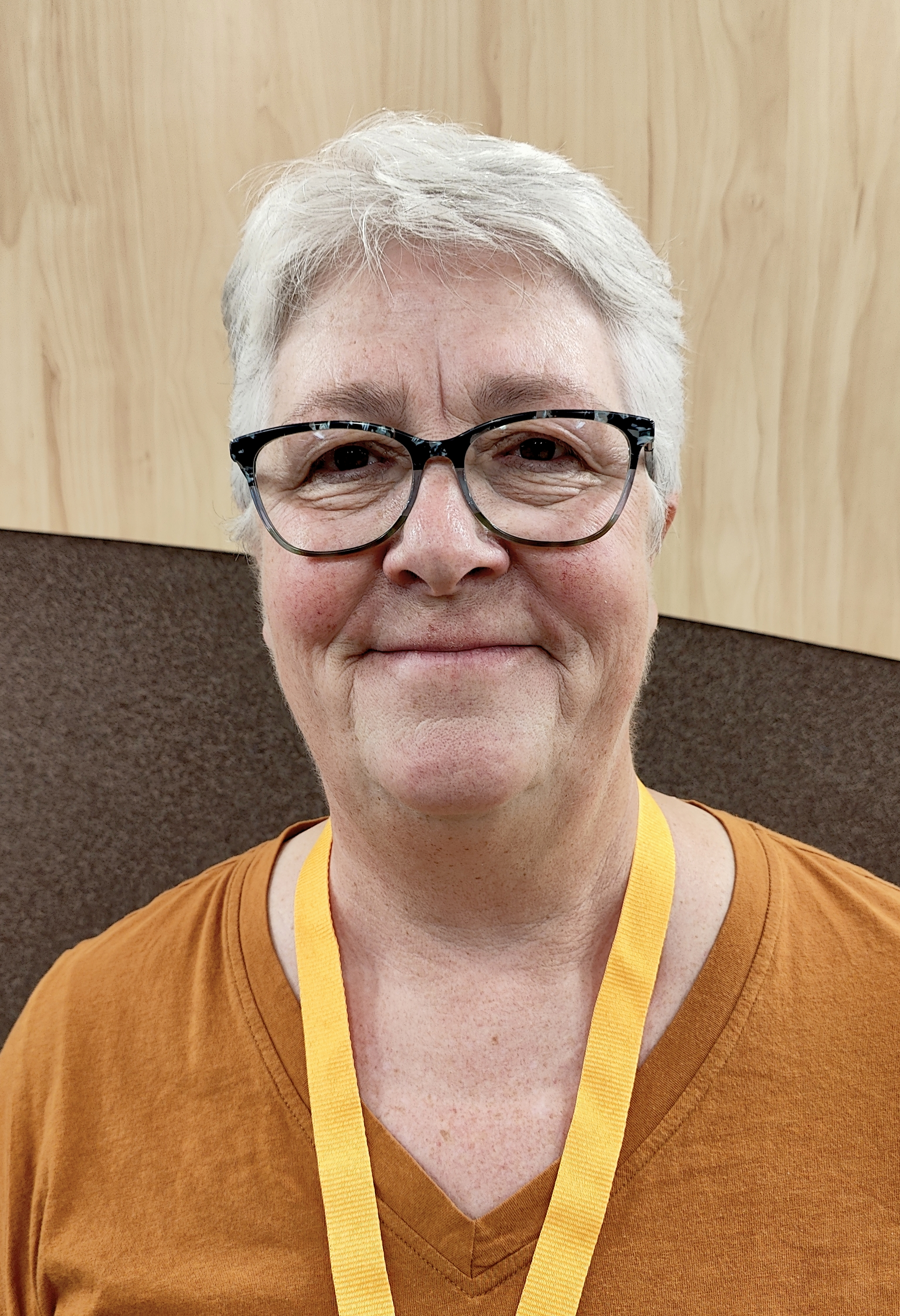

Member of the Saskatchewan Legislative Assembly for Saskatoon Nutana
- In office November 7, 2011 – October 26, 2020
- Preceded by: Pat Atkinson
- Succeeded by: Erika Ritchie

Personal details
- Born: Lafleche, Saskatchewan
- Party: Saskatchewan New Democratic Party

Cathy Sproule is a retired Canadian politician who represented the electoral district of Saskatoon Nutana in the Legislative Assembly of Saskatchewan from 2011 to 2020. A member of the Saskatchewan New Democratic Party, she was first elected in the 2011 election. She was re-elected in the 2016 election. She did not seek re-election the 2020 election and retired from politics.

While in the legislature, Sproule's critic areas included: Agriculture, Rural Affairs, Environment, SaskPower, Tourism Parks Culture & Sport, SLGA, Saskatchewan Crop Insurance, Francophone Affairs, and Provincial Secretary.

Sproule endorsed Alberta MP Heather McPherson in the 2026 New Democratic Party leadership election.
