= Dmytro Zipchen =

Canadian politician

Dmytro Zipchen (August 10, 1905 – June 25, 1996) was a Ukrainian-born farmer and political figure in Saskatchewan. He represented Redberry from 1952 to 1956 in the Legislative Assembly of Saskatchewan as a Co-operative Commonwealth Federation (CCF) member.

He was born in Horodenka in Western Ukraine and came to Canada with his family in 1906. The family settled on a homestead near Hafford, Saskatchewan. Zipchen was educated in rural schools and at the University of Saskatchewan. In 1935, he married Mary Maksymiuk. Besides farming, Zipchen also worked as a weed inspector and as an auctioneer. He also worked at the local Liquor Board store and operated a farm implement business. Zipchen served on the town council for Hafford and was reeve for the Rural Municipality of Redberry. He was also chairman of the Hafford Union Hospital Board and a founding member of the Hafford Co-op Association and the Hafford Credit Union. Zipchen was defeated by Bernard Korchinski when he ran for reelection to the provincial assembly in 1956.
