= Clinton Oliver White =

Canadian politician (1928–2020)

Clinton Oliver White (December 28, 1928 – December 31, 2020) was an educator and former political figure in Saskatchewan, Canada. He represented Regina Wascana from 1978 to 1982 in the Legislative Assembly of Saskatchewan as a New Democratic Party (NDP) member.

He was born in Endeavour, Saskatchewan, the son of Henry Donald White and Jennie Olivia Sofia Anderson, and was educated there, in Yorkton, at the University of Saskatchewan and at the University of Minnesota. In 1952, White married Matilda Schmeiser. He was a professor emeritus of history at the University of Regina. White was defeated by Gordon Currie when he ran for reelection to the provincial assembly in 1982. After leaving politics, White returned to teaching Canadian history at Campion College.

White is the author of Power for a Province: A History of Saskatchewan Power published in 1976. He died in 2020, three days after his 92nd birthday.
