= Harry Van Mulligen =

Canadian politician

MLA for Regina Victoria
- In office 1986–2003
- Preceded by: Metro Rybchuk
- Succeeded by: riding dissolved

MLA for Regina Douglas Park
- In office 2003–2009
- Preceded by: first member
- Succeeded by: Dwain Lingenfelter

Personal details
- Born: April 2, 1947 (age 79) Dwingeloo, Netherlands
- Other political affiliations: New Democratic Party

Harry Van Mulligen (born April 2, 1947) is a Canadian retired provincial politician. He was a Saskatchewan New Democratic Party member of the Legislative Assembly of Saskatchewan from 1986 to 2009, when he resigned from the legislature to permit newly elected leader Dwain Lingenfelter to run in a by-election.
