= Pat Atkinson =

Canadian politician

The Honourable Pat Atkinson ECS

Member of the Saskatchewan Legislative Assembly for Saskatoon Nutana
- In office June 21, 1995 – October 10, 2011
- Preceded by: Herman Rolfes
- Succeeded by: Cathy Sproule
- In office October 20, 1986 – September 20, 1991
- Preceded by: Evelyn Bacon
- Succeeded by: Herman Rolfes

Member of the Saskatchewan Legislative Assembly for Saskatoon Broadway
- In office October 21, 1991 – May 23, 1995
- Preceded by: first member
- Succeeded by: riding abolished

Personal details
- Born: September 27, 1952 (age 73) Biggar, Saskatchewan
- Party: New Democratic Party

Patricia "Pat" Atkinson (born September 27, 1952) is a Canadian provincial politician. She was a Saskatchewan New Democratic Party member of the Legislative Assembly of Saskatchewan from 1986 to 2011, and is the longest-serving female MLA in Saskatchewan's history.

She was born in Biggar, Saskatchewan, the daughter of Roy Atkinson, and received degrees in arts and education from the University of Saskatchewan. She worked as a teacher therapist and school principal for the Radius Community School in Saskatoon. Atkinson also served on the board of the Saskatoon Community Clinic.

She ran unsuccessfully for a seat in the Saskatchewan assembly in 1982. Atkinson was first elected in 1986, while the NDP was still in opposition. When the party was elected to government in the 1991 provincial election, she held a number of major cabinet positions, including minister of social services, health, education, Crown corporations, and finance. She was a supporter of Lorne Calvert and helped him win the party leadership in 2001. After the NDP was defeated in the 2007 election, she served as deputy leader of the opposition. Atkinson announced her retirement on January 11, 2011.
