= Clarence Estey =

Canadian politician

Clarence Leslie Baldwin Estey, QC (June 29, 1917 – March 5, 1995) was a lawyer, judge and political figure in Saskatchewan. He represented Saskatoon Nutana Centre from 1967 to 1971 in the Legislative Assembly of Saskatchewan as a Liberal.

He was born in Saskatoon, Saskatchewan, the son of James Wilfred Estey, and was educated there and at the University of Saskatchewan, where he received a Bachelor of Laws degree. He was called to the Saskatchewan bar in 1941. Estey served in the Canadian Army during World War II and returned to Canada after he was injured by friendly fire while serving in France. He then practised with his father's former law firm, Moxon and Schmidt. Estey married Virginia Grace Smith in 1945. In 1956, he was named Queen's Counsel. He was a member of the Saskatoon Public School Board, also serving as its chair.

He was an unsuccessful candidate for the Saskatoon City seat in the provincial assembly in 1964 before he was elected in 1967. Estey served in the provincial cabinet as Minister of Municipal Affairs, as Minister of the Saskatchewan Indian and Métis Department and as Minister of Industry and Commerce. He was defeated by Wes Robbins when he ran for reelection to the provincial assembly in 1971. Estey was named to the Court of Queen's Bench for Saskatchewan in 1974 and served until his retirement from the bench in 1994. He died in Saskatoon at the age of 77.
