= William Sancho Thair =

Canadian politician and farmer

William Sancho Thair (February 20, 1887 – November 28, 1966) was a farmer and political figure in Saskatchewan, Canada.

== Biography ==
He was born near Holstein, Ontario, the son of Philip Franklin Thair and Hannah Maria Mickleborough. In 1915, he married Mary Agnes Thair (Goldie Traynor). With Mary he had a son, Philip, and eight years later on the 14th of April, 1925, adopted Janet.

He farmed in the Lumsden district from 1910 to 1956. Thair was a member of the United Farmers of Canada and the Saskatchewan Wheat Pool. He served on the local school board for 27 years. He represented Lumsden in the Legislative Assembly of Saskatchewan from 1944 to 1956 as a Co-operative Commonwealth Federation (CCF) member. The 1944 election of the CCF was the first socialist government in North America. Among Thair's personal political highlights was introducing legislation which created provincial-wide state-operated crop insurance.
