= Russ Marchuk =

Canadian politician

Member of the Saskatchewan Legislative Assembly for Regina Douglas Park
- In office November 7, 2011 – March 8, 2016
- Preceded by: Dwain Lingenfelter
- Succeeded by: Nicole Sarauer

Personal details
- Born: September 1946 (age 80) Regina, Saskatchewan, Canada
- Party: Saskatchewan Party
- Education: University of Regina
- Occupation: educator

Russ Marchuk (born September 1946) is a Canadian politician, who was the Saskatchewan Party member elected to the Legislative Assembly of Saskatchewan in the 2011 election for the riding of Regina Douglas Park. Marchuk won the seat by ousting Saskatchewan New Democratic Party leader Dwain Lingenfelter in his own riding by a 10-point margin. He retired in 2016.
