= Arthur Maurice Pearson =

Canadian politician

Arthur Maurice Pearson (December 29, 1890 – July 9, 1976) was a Canadian Senator from Saskatchewan.

Pearson was born in St. François Xavier, Manitoba, now part of Winnipeg, and educated at St. John's College. He served in World War I with the Royal Flying Corps. After he was demobilized, he found work with William Pearson Company Ltd as a land surveyor and salesman. The land holding company later became the Middle West Land Company with Pearson serving as vice-president and manager. After much of the company's lands were sold, Pearson began farming the remainder in the Lumsden, Saskatchewan vicinity. He was elected to the town council and ultimately served as mayor.

He was a candidate in the 1944 and 1948 provincial elections in Saskatchewan placing third on both occasions as a Progressive Conservative Party of Saskatchewan candidate in Lumsden electoral district.

Pearson was appointed to the upper house as a Progressive Conservative Senator for the division of Lumsden, Saskatchewan. He had previously been mayor of Lumsden.

He served on various Senate committees, including a year as chairman of the Special Committee on Land Use in Canada.

He retired voluntarily from the Senate on March 31, 1971, at the age of 80. In his final statement in the chamber, he advised his fellow Senators to keep in touch with young Canadians. He said he was retiring because "in my imagination I can hear the hum of tractors again" as farmers seeded their land.
