= Dennis Banda (politician) =

Canadian politician

Dennis George Banda (born January 13, 1941) is a former farmer and political figure in Saskatchewan. He represented Redberry from 1975 to 1982 in the Legislative Assembly of Saskatchewan as a New Democratic Party (NDP) member.

He was born in Marcelin, Saskatchewan, the son of George Y. Banda and Margaret Fern Hill. In 1963, he married Florence Elizabeth Hunchak. Banda served as a delegate for the Saskatchewan Wheat Pool. He served on the board for the Marcelin Co-operative Association for 29 years. Banda was president of Federated Co-operatives Ltd. from 1997 to 2005. He also served as president of Consumers’ Co-operative Refineries Ltd.

Banda was defeated by John Gerich when he ran for reelection to the provincial assembly in 1982 and 1986.
