= Tim McLeod =

Canadian politician

The Honourable Tim McLeod ECS MLA

Member of the Saskatchewan Legislative Assembly for Moose Jaw North
- Incumbent
- Assumed office October 26, 2020
- Preceded by: Warren Michelson

Personal details
- Born: Martensville, Saskatchewan, Canada
- Party: Saskatchewan Party
- Occupation: Lawyer

Tim McLeod is a Canadian politician, who was elected to the Legislative Assembly of Saskatchewan in the 2020 Saskatchewan general election. He represents the electoral district of Moose Jaw North as a member of the Saskatchewan Party.

McLeod was appointed Provincial Secretary of Saskatchewan on May 31, 2022. He was appointed to cabinet on August 29, 2023 as Minister of Mental Health and Addictions and Minister of Seniors and Rural and Remote Health. Following the 2024 Provincial Election, McLeod was appointed as Minister of Justice and Attorney General, Minister of Corrections and Public Safety, and Government House Leader.

== Electoral record ==
2024 Saskatchewan general election: Moose Jaw North
Party	Candidate	Votes	%	±%
Saskatchewan	Tim McLeod	4,578	59.31	-4.59
New Democratic	Cheantelle Fisher	2,994	38.79	+4.99
Green	Kimberly Epp	147	1.90	-0.30
Total valid votes		7,719	99.72	
Total rejected ballots		22	0.28	-0.39
Turnout		7,741	60.68	-9.74
Eligible voters		12,757		
Source: Elections Saskatchewan
Saskatchewan hold		Swing		

2020 Saskatchewan general election: Moose Jaw North
Party	Candidate	Votes	%	±%
Saskatchewan	Tim McLeod	4,733	63.75	+2.96
New Democratic	Kyle Lichtenwald	2,532	34.11	-0.47
Green	North Hunter	159	2.14	+0.19
Total valid votes		7,424	99.33	
Total rejected ballots		50	0.67	+0.35
Turnout		7,474	70.42	+11.58
Eligible voters		10,614		
Saskatchewan hold		Swing		–
Source: Elections Saskatchewan

== Cabinet positions ==
Saskatchewan provincial government of Scott Moe
Cabinet posts (3)
Predecessor	Office	Successor
Everett Hindley	Minister of Seniors and Rural and Remote Health; August 29, 2023–present	Incumbent
Everett Hindley	Minister of Mental Health and Addictions; August 29, 2023–present	Incumbent
Lyle Stewart	Provincial Secretary of Saskatchewan; May 31, 2022–August 29, 2023	Don Morgan
