= Harry G. R. Walker =

Harry Grayson Robert Walker (c. 1912 – August 1, 1978) was an educator and politician in Saskatchewan, Canada. He served as mayor of Regina from 1971 to 1973.

Born in Regina, he completed his studies at the Regina Normal School during the 1930s. Walker taught at a country school near Rouleau and then at several schools in Regina. He served overseas during World War II and then taught for the Department of National Defence in Germany from 1958 to 1961. Afterwards, Walker returned to Regina and was principal of Massey Elementary School. He served on Regina city council from 1949 to 1952. He also served on the board of governors for the Regina General Hospital. Walker was president of the Saskatchewan Teachers' Federation from 1969 to 1970.

Walker defeated incumbent Henry Harold Peter Baker to become mayor in 1973. He died in 1978 at the age of 66.
