= Erika Ritchie =

Canadian politician (born 1969)

Erika Ritchie MLA

Member of the Saskatchewan Legislative Assembly for Saskatoon Nutana
- Incumbent
- Assumed office October 26, 2020
- Preceded by: Cathy Sproule

Personal details
- Born: 1969 (age 56–57)
- Party: New Democratic Party
- Education: University of Saskatchewan
- Profession: Environmental engineer
- Website: www.ndpcaucus.sk.ca/erikaritchie

Erika Ritchie is a Canadian politician, currently representing the riding of Saskatoon Nutana in the Legislative Assembly of Saskatchewan.

== Political career ==
Ritchie's first foray into politics was as a candidate for the New Democratic Party in the 2019 federal election for the riding of Saskatoon—Grasswood. There she lost to incumbent Kevin Waugh.

Ritchie ran for the Saskatchewan New Democratic Party in the 2020 Saskatchewan general election in a bid to replace the retired Cathy Sproule as MLA for Saskatoon Nutana. She was elected on October 26, securing 65% of the vote.

On November 4, 2020, Ritchie, formerly an environmental engineer, was named NDP critic for environment, energy and resources, SaskEnergy, SaskWater, and the Water Security Agency.

As of June 22, 2024, she serves as the Official Opposition critic for SaskEnergy, for the Water Security Agency and SaskWater, for Municipal Affairs, and for the Crown Investments Corporation.

== Personal life ==
Ritchie studied engineering at the University of Saskatchewan. In June 2019, Ritchie was elected to the board of directors for Saskatoon Co-op. Ritchie was endorsed by the grassroots group Co-op Members for Fairness, which started in support of Co-op workers during a prolonged strike over a tiered-wage system.

== Electoral results ==
2020 Saskatchewan general election: Saskatoon Nutana
Party	Candidate	Votes	%	±%
New Democratic	Erika Ritchie	4,777	65.13	+8.60
Saskatchewan	Kyle Mazer	2,339	31.89	-4.70
Green	Albert Chubak	219	2.99	+0.18
Total valid votes		7,335	100.0	
Total rejected ballots		73	1.00	+0.72
Turnout		7,408	57.20	+2.16
Eligible voters		12,951		
New Democratic hold		Swing		-
Source: Elections Saskatchewan

2019 Canadian federal election: Saskatoon—Grasswood
Party	Candidate	Votes	%	±%	Expenditures
Conservative	Kevin Waugh	26,336	53.3		$32,265.34
New Democratic	Erika Ritchie	12,672	25.6		none listed
Liberal	Tracy Muggli	8,419	17.0		$50,741.23
Green	Neil Sinclair	1,320	2.7		$335.36
People's	Mark Friesen	692	1.4		none listed
Total valid votes/Expense limit		49,439	100.0		
Total rejected ballots		337			
Turnout		49,776	77.6		
Eligible voters		64,150			
Source: Global News, Elections Canada
