= William Austin Forsyth =

Canadian politician

W. Austin Forsyth

MLA for Saskatoon Nutana South
- In office 1967–1971
- Succeeded by: Herman Rolfes

Personal details
- Born: June 20, 1917 Saskatoon, Saskatchewan
- Died: June 19, 2001 (aged 83) Saskatoon, Saskatchewan
- Party: Saskatchewan Liberal Party
- Spouse: Ethel McGuire (m. 1942)
- Children: Five
- Profession: Optometrist

William Austin Forsyth (June 20, 1917 – June 19, 2001) was a Canadian politician who represented Saskatoon Nutana South as a Liberal in the Legislative Assembly of Saskatchewan from 1967 to 1971. He was born in Saskatoon, of Scottish parentage and was a veteran of the Royal Air Force in World War II. Forsyth attended the University of Saskatchewan and University of California and was an optometrist. Dr. Forsyth was one of the founders of the Saskatoon Foundation in 1970, now known as Saskatoon Community Foundation.
