= Warren Michelson =

Canadian politician

Member of the Saskatchewan Legislative Assembly for Moose Jaw North
- In office November 7, 2007 – October 26, 2020
- Preceded by: Glenn Hagel
- Succeeded by: Tim McLeod

Personal details
- Born: Lipton, Saskatchewan, Canada
- Party: Saskatchewan Party

Warren Michelson is a former Canadian politician who represented the electoral district of Moose Jaw North in the Legislative Assembly of Saskatchewan from 2007 to 2020. He is a member of the Saskatchewan Party. He defeated long time NDP MLA Glenn Hagel to win the seat.

In the 2018 Saskatchewan Party leadership election, Michelson supported Ken Cheveldayoff, who had stated that he doesn't believe rape victims should have legal access to abortion services, earning him the anti-abortion group Right Now's top rank out of the six leadership candidates. Michelson had previously attended as an MLA the anti-abortion March for Life rallies in Ottawa, Moose Jaw, and Regina in the past.

As a president with the Saskatchewan Chamber of Commerce, Michelson led the charge against a proposed government-directed employment hours scheme in the private sector.

Michelson did not seek re-election in the 2020 Saskatchewan general election.
