= William John Vancise =

Canadian politician

William John Vancise (June 19, 1872 – 1935) was a farmer and political figure in Saskatchewan. He represented Lumsden in the Legislative Assembly of Saskatchewan from 1917 to 1925 as a Liberal.

He was born in McIntyre, Ontario, the son of Albert Vancise and Anne McKinnon. In 1901, Vancise married Jennie Campbell. He lived in Grand Coulee, Saskatchewan.
