= Frederick Clarke Tate =

Canadian politician

Frederick Clarke Tate (January 24, 1849 – 1920) was a farmer and political figure in Saskatchewan. He represented Regina County from 1908 to 1912 as a Provincial Rights Party member and Lumsden from 1912 to 1917 as a Conservative in the Legislative Assembly of Saskatchewan.

He was born in Grafton, Ontario, the son of Robert Tate and Margaret Clarke, and was educated there and in Brighton. Tate taught school for five years in Ontario and then travelled west in 1882. He was a sergeant-major in the Northumberland militia. In 1897, Tate married Mae Eliza Roberts. He ran unsuccessfully for the Lumsden seat in the provincial assembly in 1905. In 1908 Tate chose to contest the riding again but veteran MLA James Hawkes ran against him for the Provincial Rights nomination and although Tate narrowly defeated him many delegates declared that Hawkes was more entitled to the seat, for his part Hawkes declared that he "did not feel like supporting Tate."

The Liberals sought to take advantage of this division by asking Hawkes to run as their candidate in the riding, replacing Premier Walter Scott, and it was reported that should he run as a Liberal or even as an independent in that constituency Hawkes could expect "a good thing" from the government. Hawkes rejected the Liberal offers and subsequently announced that he would support Tate, and it was believed that his large following within the German community would be decisive in the election. Recognizing that Hawkes could not be bought, members of the local Liberal association then offered the nomination to R.A. Carman, solely because he was known to be a friend of James Hawkes, but ultimately Carman did not run either. With the support of Hawkes Tate won the seat.

Tate lived in Wascana, Saskatchewan.
