= Saskatoon South (provincial electoral district) =

Former provincial electoral district in Saskatchewan, Canada

Saskatoon South was a provincial electoral district for the Legislative Assembly of Saskatchewan, Canada. It was last contested in the 1986 Saskatchewan general election when it was dissolved into other ridings.

== History ==
The riding largely replaced Saskatoon Buena Vista.

== Members ==
- Robert Edward William Myers (1982 to 1986) (Progressive Conservative)
- Herman Rolfes (1986–1991) (New Democratic Party)

== See also ==
- List of Saskatchewan provincial electoral districts
- List of Saskatchewan general elections
- Canadian provincial electoral districts
