= Orest Zerebko =

Canadian politician

Orest Zerebko (September 15, 1887 – February 21, 1943) was a Galician-born journalist and political figure in Saskatchewan. He represented Redberry from 1938 to 1943 in the Legislative Assembly of Saskatchewan as a Liberal.

He was born in Horodenka, Austria-Hungary, the son of Elias Zerebko, of Ukrainian descent, and came to Canada in 1900. In 1913, Zerebko received a Bachelor of Arts degree from the University of Manitoba, becoming the first person of Ukrainian descent to graduate from a Canadian university. He was a contributor and later editor-in-chief for the weekly Ukrainian newspaper Ukrainskyi Holos. He died in office at home in Blaine Lake at the age of 55.
