= Darrel Verner Heald =

Canadian politician

Darrel Verner Heald (August 27, 1919 – August 8, 2010) was a lawyer and political figure in Saskatchewan and a Canadian federal judge. He represented Lumsden from 1964 to 1971 in the Legislative Assembly of Saskatchewan as a Liberal.

He was born in Regina, Saskatchewan, the son of Herbert Heald and Lotta Knutson, and was educated in Liberty, in Govan and at the University of Saskatchewan, where he received B.A. and a LLB degrees. Heald articled in Regina. He then served with the Royal Canadian Air Force during World War II. After the war, Heald practised law in Regina. In 1951, he married Doris Rose Hessey. He served in the provincial cabinet as Attorney General, as Provincial Secretary and as Minister of Co-operation and Co-operative Development. Heald was defeated by Gary Lane when he ran for reelection to the Saskatchewan assembly in 1971. He was a member of the executive for the Saskatchewan Roughriders and was president of the Regina Curling Club. In 1971, he was named to the Federal Court of Canada in Ottawa, serving in both the Trial and Appeal divisions. Heald retired from the bench in 1989. He retired to British Columbia and died there at the age of 90.
