= Saskatoon Nutana =

Provincial electoral district in Saskatchewan, Canada

Saskatchewan electoral district
- Coordinates: 52.112°N 106.659°W

Provincial electoral district
- Legislature: Legislative Assembly of Saskatchewan
MLA
Erika Ritchie
New Democratic
- District created: 1967 as "Saskatoon Nutana Centre"
- First contested: 1967
- Last contested: 2024
- Communities: Saskatoon

Saskatoon Nutana is a provincial electoral district for the Legislative Assembly of Saskatchewan, Canada. It is named for the neighbourhood of Nutana which is one of several within its electoral boundaries.

== Members of the Legislative Assembly ==
This riding has elected the following members of the Legislative Assembly of Saskatchewan:

Legislature	Years	Member	Party
Saskatoon Nutana Centre
16th	1967–1971	Clarence Estey	Liberal
17th	1971–1975	Wesley Albert Robbins	New Democrat
Saskatoon Nutana
18th	1975–1978	Wesley Albert Robbins	New Democrat
19th	1978–1982	Wesley Albert Robbins	New Democrat
20th	1982–1986	Evelyn Bacon	Progressive Conservative
21st	1986–1991	Pat Atkinson	New Democrat
22nd	1991–1995	Herman Rolfes	New Democrat
23rd	1995–1999	Pat Atkinson	New Democrat
24th	1999–2003	Pat Atkinson	New Democrat
25th	2003–2007	Pat Atkinson	New Democrat
26th	2007–2011	Pat Atkinson	New Democrat
27th	2011–2016	Cathy Sproule	New Democrat
28th	2016–2020	Cathy Sproule	New Democrat
29th	2020–2024	Erika Ritchie	New Democrat
30th	2024–present	Erika Ritchie	New Democrat

== Election results ==
2024 Saskatchewan general election
Party	Candidate	Votes	%	±%
New Democratic	Erika Ritchie	6,163	74.21	+9.09
Saskatchewan	Mumtaz Naseeb	1,956	23.55	-8.34
Green	Whitney Greenleaf	186	2.24	-0.75
Total valid votes		8,305	98.85	
Total rejected ballots		97	1.15	
Turnout		8,402	61.54	
Eligible voters		13,653		
New Democratic hold		Swing		
Source: Elections Saskatchewan

2020 Saskatchewan general election
Party	Candidate	Votes	%	±%
New Democratic	Erika Ritchie	4,777	65.12	+8.59
Saskatchewan	Kyle Mazer	2,339	31.89	-4.70
Green	Albert Chubak	219	2.99	+0.18
Total valid votes		7,335	99.02	
Total rejected ballots		73	0.98	+0.70
Turnout		7,408	57.20	+2.16
Eligible voters		12,951		
New Democratic hold		Swing		–
Source: Elections Saskatchewan

2016 Saskatchewan general election
Party	Candidate	Votes	%	±%
New Democratic	Cathy Sproule	3,822	56.53	–
Saskatchewan	Jamie Brandrick	2,474	36.59	–
Liberal	Robin Schneider	275	4.07	–
Green	Jaime Fairley	190	2.81	–
Total valid votes		6,761	100.0	
Total rejected ballots		19	0.28	
Turnout		6,780	55.04	
Eligible voters		12,319		
New Democratic hold		Swing		–
Source: Elections Saskatchewan

2011 Saskatchewan general election
Party	Candidate	Votes	%	±%
New Democratic	Cathy Sproule	3,793	49.64	-
Saskatchewan	Zoria Broughton	3,290	43.06	-
Green	Mark Bigland-Pritchard	369	4.83	-
Liberal	Cole Hogan	189	2.47	-
Total		7,641	100	
New Democratic hold		Swing		-
Source: Elections Saskatchewan

2007 Saskatchewan general election
Party	Candidate	Votes	%	±%
New Democratic	Pat Atkinson	4,529	51.70	–
Saskatchewan	Don Johannesson	2,552	29.13	–
Liberal	Grant Karwacki	1,147	13.09	–
Green	Sandra Finley	355	4.05	–
Marijuana	Christine King	109	1.24	–
Progressive Conservative	Gwen Katzman	68	0.78	–
Total		8,760	100	
New Democratic hold		Swing		-
Source: Elections Saskatchewan

2003 Saskatchewan general election
Party	Candidate	Votes	%	±%
New Democratic	Pat Atkinson	4,593	55.47	-
Liberal	Grant Karwacki	1,946	23.50	-
Saskatchewan	Sandy Ewert	1,549	18.71	-
New Green	Neal Anderson	192	2.32	-
Total		8,280	100.00	
New Democratic hold		Swing		-
Source: Elections Saskatchewan

1999 Saskatchewan general election
Party	Candidate	Votes	%	±%
New Democratic	Pat Atkinson	3,671	53.94	-
Saskatchewan	Terry Biddell	1,472	21.63	-
Liberal	George Haines	1,068	15.69	-
New Green	Patrick L. Smith	520	7.64	-
Progressive Conservative	Dave Mathers	75	1.10	–
Total		6,806	100.00	
New Democratic hold		Swing		-
Source: Elections Saskatchewan

1995 Saskatchewan general election
Party	Candidate	Votes	%	±%
New Democratic	Pat Atkinson	4,396	64.82	-
Liberal	George Haines	2,776	27.40	-
Progressive Conservative	Kim Scruby	791	13.05	-
Total		6,782	100.00	
New Democratic hold		Swing		-
Source: Elections Saskatchewan

1991 Saskatchewan general election
Party	Candidate	Votes	%	±%
New Democratic	Herman Rolfes	5,452	55.84	-
Liberal	Shirley Khan	3,048	31.22	-
Progressive Conservative	Jerry Ehalt	1,264	12.94	-
Total		9,764	100.00	
New Democratic hold		Swing		-
Source: Elections Saskatchewan

1986 Saskatchewan general election
Party	Candidate	Votes	%	±%
New Democratic	Pat Atkinson	4,719	59.52	-
Progressive Conservative	Merv Houghton	2,439	30.77	-
Liberal	Gene Pulak	770	9.71	-
Total		7,928	100.00	
New Democratic gain from Progressive Conservative		Swing		-
Source: Elections Saskatchewan

1982 Saskatchewan general election
Party	Candidate	Votes	%	±%
Progressive Conservative	Evelyn Bacon	3,685	47.81	-
New Democratic	Pat Atkinson	3,530	45.80	-
Liberal	David T. Tunney	492	6.38	-
Total		7,707	100.00	
Progressive Conservative gain from New Democratic		Swing		-
Source: Elections Saskatchewan

1978 Saskatchewan general election
Party	Candidate	Votes	%	±%
New Democratic	Wesley Albert Robbins	4,739	57.20	-
Progressive Conservative	Grant Devine	2,466	29.76	-
Liberal	John A. Shanks	1,080	13.04	-
Total		8,285	100.00	
New Democratic hold		Swing		-
Source: Elections Saskatchewan

1975 Saskatchewan general election
Party	Candidate	Votes	%	±%
New Democratic	Wesley Albert Robbins	3,881	46.91	-
Liberal	Bruno F. Riemer	2,280	27.56	-
Progressive Conservative	Kay McCorkell	2,112	25.53	-
Total		8,273	100.00	
New Democratic hold		Swing		-
Source: Elections Saskatchewan

1971 Saskatchewan general election: Saskatoon Nutana Centre
Party	Candidate	Votes	%	±%
New Democratic	Wesley Albert Robbins			-
Liberal				-
Progressive Conservative				
New Democratic gain from Liberal		Swing		-
Total			100.00	

1967 Saskatchewan general election: Saskatoon Nutana Centre
Party	Candidate	Votes	%
Liberal	Clarence Estey	6,184	50.46
New Democratic	Wesley Albert Robbins	4,902	39.99
Progressive Conservative	George Bateman	1,170	9.55
Total		12,256	100.00

== See also ==
- List of Saskatchewan provincial electoral districts
- List of Saskatchewan general elections
- Canadian provincial electoral districts
