= Lumsden (electoral district) =

Former provincial electoral district in Saskatchewan, Canada

Coordinates: 50°37′N 104°43′W

Lumsden was a provincial electoral division for the Legislative Assembly of the province of Saskatchewan, Canada. The district was one of 25 created before the 1st Saskatchewan general election in 1905. It was the riding of Premier Thomas Walter Scott.

The Lumsden constituency was renamed "Regina County" between the 1908 election and the 1912 election. Redrawn to include the area of the abolished district of North Qu'Appelle in 1934, the constituency was renamed "Qu'Appelle". Redrawn and renamed again as "Qu'Appelle-Lumsden" in 1982, the riding was abolished before the 23rd Saskatchewan general election in 1995. It is now part of the Regina Qu'Appelle Valley, Lumsden-Morse, and Last Mountain-Touchwood constituencies.

== Members of the Legislative Assembly ==
=== Lumsden & Regina County (1905–1975) ===
#	MLA	Served	Party
1.	Thomas Walter Scott	1905–1908	Liberal
2.	Frederick Clarke Tate	1908–1917	Provincial Rights, Conservative
3.	William John Vancise	1917–1925	Liberal
4.	Hugh Kerr Miller	1925–1929	Liberal
5.	James Fraser Bryant	1929–1934	Conservative
6.	Henry Phillip Mang	1934–1938	Liberal
7.	Robert S. Donaldson	1938–1944	Liberal
8.	William Thair	1944–1956	CCF
9.	Cliff Thurston	1956–1964	CCF
10.	Darrel V. Heald	1964–1971	Liberal
11.	Gary Lane	1971–1975	Liberal

=== Qu'Appelle (1975–1982) ===
#	MLA	Served	Party
1.	Gary Lane	1975–1978	Liberal
2.	Gary Lane	1978–1982	Progressive Conservative

=== Qu'Appelle-Lumsden (1982–1995) ===
#	MLA	Served	Party
1.	Gary Lane	1982–1991	Progressive Conservative
2.	Suzanne Murray	1991–1995	New Democrat

== Election results ==
1905 Saskatchewan general election: Lumsden electoral district
Party	Candidate	Votes	%	±%
Liberal	Thomas Walter Scott	913	56.57%	–
Provincial Rights	Frederick Clarke Tate	701	43.43%	–
Total		1,614	100.00%	

1908 Saskatchewan general election: Regina County electoral district
Party	Candidate	Votes	%	±%
Provincial Rights	Frederick Clarke Tate	1,149	59.78%	+16.35
Liberal	Robert Sinton	773	40.22%	-16.35
Total		1,922	100.00%	

1912 Saskatchewan general election: Lumsden electoral district
Party	Candidate	Votes	%	±%
Conservative	Frederick Clarke Tate	950	54.01%	-5.77
Liberal	James Russell	809	45.99%	+5.77
Total		1,759	100.00%	

1917 Saskatchewan general election: Lumsden electoral district
Party	Candidate	Votes	%	±%
Liberal	William John Vancise	2,259	52.12%	+6.13
Conservative	Frederick Clarke Tate	2,075	47.88%	-6.13
Total		4,334	100.00%	

1921 Saskatchewan general election: Lumsden electoral district
Party	Candidate	Votes	%	±%
Liberal	William John Vancise	1,878	64.07%	+11.95
Independent	John Kenneth McInnis	1,053	35.93%	–
Total		2,931	100.00%	

1925 Saskatchewan general election: Lumsden electoral district
Party	Candidate	Votes	%	±%
Liberal	Hugh Kerr Miller	1,884	50.78%	-13.29
Progressive	Hugh McGillivray	1,826	49.22%	–
Total		3,710	100.00%	

1929 Saskatchewan general election: Lumsden electoral district
Party	Candidate	Votes	%	±%
Conservative	James Fraser Bryant	2,872	55.27%	+55.27
Liberal	Hugh Kerr Miller	2,157	41.51%	-9.27
Progressive	William James Cockburn	167	3.22%	-46.00
Total		5,196	100.00%	

September 30, 1929 By-Election: Lumsden electoral district
Party	Candidate	Votes	%	±%
Conservative	James Fraser Bryant	Acclaimed	100.00%	
Total		Acclamation		

1934 Saskatchewan general election: Lumsden electoral district
Party	Candidate	Votes	%	±%
Liberal	Henry Phillip Mang	2,352	45.78%	-
Conservative	James Fraser Bryant	1,716	33.40%	-
Farmer-Labour	Tom Johnston	1,070	20.82%	-
Total		5,138	100.00%	

1938 Saskatchewan general election: Lumsden electoral district
Party	Candidate	Votes	%	±%
Liberal	Robert S. Donaldson	2,596	37.14%	-8.64
Conservative	Claude H.J. Burrows	1,923	27.51%	-5.89
CCF	McDirmid Rankin	1,847	26.42%	+5.60
Social Credit	Thomas Allan McInnis	624	8.93%	–
Total		6,990	100.00%	

1944 Saskatchewan general election: Lumsden electoral district
Party	Candidate	Votes	%	±%
CCF	William Thair	2,966	48.84%	+22.42
Liberal	James Knox	1,887	31.07%	-6.07
Prog. Conservative	Arthur Pearson	1,220	20.09%	-7.42
Total		6,073	100.00%	

1948 Saskatchewan general election: Lumsden electoral district
Party	Candidate	Votes	%	±%
CCF	William Thair	2,876	42.03%	-6.81
Liberal	Henry P. Mang	2,220	32.44%	+1.37
Prog. Conservative	Arthur Pearson	1,003	14.66%	-5.43
Social Credit	Gustav D. Pelzer	744	10.87%	-
Total		6,843	100.00%	

1952 Saskatchewan general election: Lumsden electoral district
Party	Candidate	Votes	%	±%
CCF	William Thair	2,642	43.86%	+1.83
Liberal	Neil Scheuerwater	1,703	28.28%	-4.16
Prog. Conservative	Alvin Hamilton	1,521	25.25%	+10.59
Social Credit	Fred Fahlman	157	2.61%	-8.26
Total		6,023	100.00%	

1956 Saskatchewan general election: Lumsden electoral district
Party	Candidate	Votes	%	±%
CCF	Cliff Thurston	2,193	36.49%	-7.37
Liberal	Stephen Grad	1,845	30.70%	+2.42
Social Credit	William C. Gamelin	1,518	25.26%	+22.65
Prog. Conservative	Samuel Haggerty	454	7.55%	-17.70
Total		6,010	100.00%	

1960 Saskatchewan general election: Lumsden electoral district
Party	Candidate	Votes	%	±%
CCF	Cliff Thurston	2,194	34.88%	-1.61
Liberal	Geoffrey Stirton	1,815	28.85%	-1.85
Social Credit	Joseph Thauberger	1,291	20.52%	-4.74
Prog. Conservative	Robert Topping	991	15.75%	+8.20
Total		6,291	100.00%	

1964 Saskatchewan general election: Lumsden electoral district
Party	Candidate	Votes	%	±%
Liberal	Darrel V. Heald	2,469	40.07%	+11.22
CCF	Cliff Thurston	2,078	33.73%	-1.15
Prog. Conservative	William Tufts	1,614	26.20%	+10.45
Total		6,161	100.00%	

1967 Saskatchewan general election: Lumsden electoral district
Party	Candidate	Votes	%	±%
Liberal	Darrel V. Heald	2,812	48.13%	+8.06
NDP	Cliff Thurston	2,114	36.18%	+2.45
Prog. Conservative	Donald K. MacPherson	917	15.69%	-10.51
Total		5,843	100.00%	

1971 Saskatchewan general election: Lumsden electoral district
Party	Candidate	Votes	%	±%
Liberal	Gary Lane	2,875	46.48%	-1.65
NDP	Cliff Thurston	2,743	44.34%	+8.16
Prog. Conservative	C. Robin Hahn	568	9.18%	-6.51
Total		6,186	100.00%	

=== Qu'Appelle ===
1975 Saskatchewan general election: Qu'Appelle electoral district
Party	Candidate	Votes	%	±%
Liberal	Gary Lane	3,796	42.03%	-4.45
NDP	Donald W. Cody	3,430	37.97%	-6.37
Prog. Conservative	F. Warren Denzin	1,806	20.00%	+10.82
Total		9,032	100.00%	

1978 Saskatchewan general election: Qu'Appelle electoral district
Party	Candidate	Votes	%	±%
Progressive Conservative	Gary Lane	7,231	46.30%	+26.30
NDP	Greg Willows	6,844	43.83%	+5.86
Liberal	J. Don McCullough	1,541	9.87%	-32.16
Total		15,616	100.00%	

=== Qu'Appelle-Lumsden ===
1982 Saskatchewan general election: Qu'Appelle-Lumsden
Party	Candidate	Votes	%	±%
Progressive Conservative	Gary Lane	5,643	65.77%	+19.47
NDP	Tom Usherwood	2,372	27.65%	-16.18
Western Canada Concept	Allan Smith	346	4.03%	–
Liberal	Cheryl Stadnyk	219	2.55%	-7.32
Total		8,580	100.00%	

1986 Saskatchewan general election: Qu'Appelle-Lumsden
Party	Candidate	Votes	%	±%
Progressive Conservative	Gary Lane	4,490	47.55%	-18.22
NDP	Suzanne Murray	3,763	39.86%	+12.21
Liberal	Linda Boxall	1,150	12.18%	+9.63
Western Canada Concept	Joey Gargol	39	0.41%	-3.62
Total		9,442	100.00%	

1991 Saskatchewan general election: Qu'Appelle-Lumsden
Party	Candidate	Votes	%	±%
NDP	Suzanne Murray	4,907	48.30%	+8.44
Liberal	Dawn Garner	2,827	27.82%	+15.64
Prog. Conservative	Martin Kenney	2,426	23.88%	-23.67
Total		10,160	100.00%	

== See also ==
- List of Saskatchewan provincial electoral districts
- List of Saskatchewan general elections
- Canadian provincial electoral districts
