= Moose Jaw North =

Provincial electoral district in Saskatchewan, Canada

Coordinates: 50°24′20″N 105°32′05″W

Saskatchewan electoral district

Provincial electoral district
- Legislature: Legislative Assembly of Saskatchewan
MLA
Tim McLeod
Saskatchewan
- First contested: 1967
- Last contested: 2020

Demographics
- Electors: 10,614
- Communities: Moose Jaw

Moose Jaw North is a provincial electoral district for the Legislative Assembly of Saskatchewan, Canada. One of two provincial constituencies for the city of Moose Jaw, the riding contains the area of the city north of Caribou Street from 9th Avenue in the east to Thatcher Drive in the west.

== History ==
This district (along with its counterpart Moose Jaw Wakamow) was created for the 1967 election after the Saskatchewan government decided to retire a system of multiple-MLA electoral divisions for the cities of Regina, Saskatoon, and Moose Jaw. The riding's name was changed to Moose Jaw Palliser for the 1991 general election, and subsequently changed back to Moose Jaw North for the 1995 general election.

For the 2024 general election, the riding gained a section of the Rural Municipality of Moose Jaw north of the city limits, from the Trans-Canada Highway northward to Eight Mile Road. However, the riding's southern boundary within the city did not change.

== Members of the Legislative Assembly ==
Legislature	Years	Member	Party
Moose Jaw North
16th	1967–1971	Gordon Snyder	New Democrat
17th	1971–1975	Don MacDonald	Liberal
18th	1975–1978	John Skoberg	New Democrat
19th	1978–1982	John Skoberg	New Democrat
20th	1982–1986	Keith Parker	Progressive Conservative
21st	1986–1991	Glenn Hagel	New Democrat
Moose Jaw Palliser
22nd	1991–1995	Glenn Hagel	New Democrat
Moose Jaw North
23rd	1995–1999	Glenn Hagel	New Democrat
24th	1999–2003	Glenn Hagel	New Democrat
25th	2003–2007	Glenn Hagel	New Democrat
26th	2007–2011	Warren Michelson	Saskatchewan Party
27th	2011–2016	Warren Michelson	Saskatchewan Party
28th	2016–2020	Warren Michelson	Saskatchewan Party
29th	2020–2024	Tim McLeod	Saskatchewan Party
30th	2024–present	Tim McLeod	Saskatchewan Party

== Election results ==
2024 Saskatchewan general election
Party	Candidate	Votes	%	±%
Saskatchewan	Tim McLeod	4,578	59.31	-4.59
New Democratic	Cheantelle Fisher	2,994	38.79	+4.99
Green	Kimberly Epp	147	1.90	-0.30
Total valid votes		7,719	99.72	
Total rejected ballots		22	0.28	-0.39
Turnout		7,741	60.68	-9.74
Eligible voters		12,757		
Source: Elections Saskatchewan
Saskatchewan hold		Swing		

2020 provincial election redistributed results
Party	%
Saskatchewan	63.9
New Democratic	33.8
Green	2.2
Others	0.1

2020 Saskatchewan general election
Party	Candidate	Votes	%	±%
Saskatchewan	Tim McLeod	4,733	63.75	+2.96
New Democratic	Kyle Lichtenwald	2,532	34.11	-0.47
Green	North Hunter	159	2.14	+0.19
Total valid votes		7,424	99.33	
Total rejected ballots		50	0.67	+0.35
Turnout		7,474	70.42	+11.58
Eligible voters		10,614		
Saskatchewan hold		Swing		–
Source: Elections Saskatchewan

2016 Saskatchewan general election
Party	Candidate	Votes	%	±%
Saskatchewan	Warren Michelson	4,425	60.79	+1.62
New Democratic	Corey Atkinson	2,517	34.58	-1.30
Liberal	Brenda Colenutt	194	2.66	-
Green	Caleb Maclowich	142	1.95	+0.67
Total valid votes		7,278	99.68	
Total rejected ballots		23	0.32	–
Turnout		7,301	58.84	–
Eligible voters		12,408		
Source: Elections Saskatchewan

2011 Saskatchewan general election: Moose Jaw North electoral district
Party	Candidate	Votes	%	±%
Saskatchewan	Warren Michelson	4,565	59.17	+13.34
NDP	Derek Hassen	2,768	35.88	-9.57
Prog. Conservative	Rick Swenson	283	3.67	-
Green	Corinne Johnson	99	1.28	-0.18
Total		7,715	100.00	

2007 Saskatchewan general election: Moose Jaw North electoral district
Party	Candidate	Votes	%	±%
Saskatchewan	Warren Michelson	3,960	45.83	+9.98
NDP	Glenn Hagel	3,927	45.45	-12.41
Liberal	John Morris	627	7.26	+1.82
Green	Deanna Robilliard	126	1.46	+0.61
Total		8,640	100.00	

2003 Saskatchewan general election: Moose Jaw North electoral district
Party	Candidate	Votes	%	±%
NDP	Glenn Hagel	4,580	57.86	+7.21
Saskatchewan	Darin Chow	2,838	35.85	-4.83
Liberal	Dean Legare	431	5.44	-3.23
New Green	Michael Wright	67	0.85	*
Total		7,916	100.00	

1999 Saskatchewan general election: Moose Jaw North electoral district
Party	Candidate	Votes	%	±%
NDP	Glenn Hagel	3,451	50.65	-6.38
Saskatchewan	Alene Tanner	2,772	40.68	*
Liberal	Tatum Benz	591	8.67	-19.84
Total		6,814	100.00	

1995 Saskatchewan general election: Moose Jaw North electoral district
Party	Candidate	Votes	%	±%
NDP	Glenn Hagel	4,067	57.03	-1.41
Liberal	Joan Morris	2,033	28.51	+6.70
Prog. Conservative	John E. Langford	1,031	14.46	-5.29
Total		7,131	100.00	

1991 Saskatchewan general election: Moose Jaw Palliser electoral district
Party	Candidate	Votes	%	±%
NDP	Glenn Hagel	5,681	58.44	+8.09
Liberal	Michael Klein	2,120	21.81	+12.72
Prog. Conservative	Colleen Basarsky	1,920	19.75	-20.31
Total		9,721	100.00	

1986 Saskatchewan general election: Moose Jaw North electoral district
Party	Candidate	Votes	%	±%
NDP	Glenn Hagel	5,370	50.35	+12.79
Prog. Conservative	Keith Parker	4,273	40.06	-16.43
Liberal	Tim Crosbie	970	9.09	+5.61
Western Canada Concept	Nick Dowhy Jr.	33	0.31	-2.16
Alliance	Clifford H. Hume	20	0.19	*
Total		10,666	100.00	

1982 Saskatchewan general election: Moose Jaw North electoral district
Party	Candidate	Votes	%	±%
Prog. Conservative	Keith Parker	5,859	56.49	+17.01
NDP	Glenn Hagel	3,895	37.56	-11.89
Liberal	Terrance W. Ocrane	361	3.48	-7.59
Western Canada Concept	Colin R. Campbell	256	2.47	*
Total		10,371	100.00	

1978 Saskatchewan general election: Moose Jaw North electoral district
Party	Candidate	Votes	%	±%
NDP	John Skoberg	4,483	49.45	+6.31
Prog. Conservative	Kerry R. Chow	3,579	39.48	+11.04
Liberal	Gene Chura	1,003	11.07	-17.35
Total		9,065	100.00	

1975 Saskatchewan general election: Moose Jaw North electoral district
Party	Candidate	Votes	%	±%
NDP	John Skoberg	3,468	43.14	-4.26
Prog. Conservative	Ken Glenn	2,286	28.44	-
Liberal	Emmett Reidy	2,284	28.42	-24.18
Total		8,038	100.00	

1971 Saskatchewan general election: Moose Jaw North electoral district
Party	Candidate	Votes	%	±%
Liberal	Don MacDonald	2,779	52.60	+12.00
NDP	Thomas Gifco	2,504	47.40	+4.78
Total		5,283	100.00	

1967 Saskatchewan general election: Moose Jaw North electoral district
Party	Candidate	Votes	%	±%
NDP	Gordon Snyder	2,860	42.62	*
Liberal	Vic Cole	2,725	40.60	*
Prog. Conservative	Daniel J. Patterson	1,126	16.78	*
Total		6,711	100.00	

== See also ==
- List of Saskatchewan provincial electoral districts
- List of Saskatchewan general elections
- Canadian provincial electoral districts
