= Aboriginal People's Party =

The Aboriginal People's Party was a political party in the Canadian province of Saskatchewan that nominated 10 candidates in the 1982 elections for the Legislative Assembly of Saskatchewan.

The aim of the party was to promote the interests of First Nations and Métis people in the province.

The party fared poorly: it collected only 1,156 votes, 0.22% of the provincial total. It won no seats in the legislature, and did not nominate candidates in any subsequent election.

== See also ==
- List of Canadian political parties
- Politics of Saskatchewan
