= Wesley Albert Robbins =

Canadian politician

Wesley Albert Robbins (August 14, 1916 – March 12, 2008) was an educator, accountant and political figure in Saskatchewan. He represented Saskatoon City from 1964 to 1967 as a Co-operative Commonwealth Federation (CCF) member and then Saskatoon Nutana Centre from 1971 to 1975 and Saskatoon Nutana from 1975 to 1982 as a New Democratic Party (NDP) member in the Legislative Assembly of Saskatchewan.

He was born in Laura, Saskatchewan, the son of Norman Robbins, and was educated locally, at the Saskatoon Teachers' College and at the University of Saskatchewan, where he majored in economics. Robbins taught school from 1938 to 1941 and then worked as an accountant in Saskatoon from 1941 to 1954. He also served as president of the Saskatoon Credit Union. In 1946, he married Marion Nichol. Robbins was a member of the provincial cabinet, serving as Minister of Finance, as Minister of Co-operation and Co-operative Development. as Minister of Consumer Affairs, as Minister of Health, as Minister of Revenue and as Minister of Revenue, Supply and Services. He was defeated by Clarence Estey when he ran for reelection in 1967 and then defeated Estey in 1971. He retired from politics in 1982. Robbins died in Saskatoon at the age of 91.
