= Redberry (electoral district) =

Former provincial electoral district in Saskatchewan, Canada

Coordinates: 52°45′N 107°20′W

Redberry was a provincial electoral district for the Legislative Assembly of the province of Saskatchewan, Canada, centred on the town of Hafford. This constituency was one of 25 created before the 1st Saskatchewan general election in 1905. Dissolved in 1934, the district was reconstituted before the 9th Saskatchewan general election in 1938, and renamed "Redberry Lake" in 1995.

It is now part of the constituencies of Biggar and Rosthern-Shellbrook.

== Members of the Legislative Assembly ==
=== 1905–1934 ===
#	MLA	Served	Party
1.	George Langley	1905 – 1921	Liberal
2.	George Cockburn	1921 – 1925	Independent
3.	George Cockburn	1925 – 1929	Progressive
4.	George Cockburn	1929 – 1934	Liberal

=== 1938–2003 ===
#	MLA	Served	Party
1.	Orest Zerebko	1938 – 1944	Liberal
2.	Dmytro Lazorko	1944 – 1948	CCF
3.	Bernard Korchinski	1948 – 1952	Liberal
4.	Dmytro Zipchen	1952 – 1956	CCF
5.	Bernard Korchinski	1956 – 1960	Liberal
6.	Dick Michayluk	1960 – 1975	CCF-NDP
7.	Dennis Banda	1975 – 1982	New Democrat
8.	John Gerich	1982 – 1991	Progressive Conservative
9.	Walt Jess	1991 – 1999	New Democrat
10.	Randy Weekes	1999 – 2003	Saskatchewan Party

== Election results ==
1905 Saskatchewan general election: Redberry electoral district
Party	Candidate	Votes	%	±%
Liberal	George Langley	310	60.55%	–
Provincial Rights	Samuel Alexander Hamilton	202	39.45%	–
Total		512	100.00%	

1908 Saskatchewan general election: Redberry electoral district
Party	Candidate	Votes	%	±%
Liberal	George Langley	595	55.20%	-5.35
Provincial Rights	Claude Percival Evans	483	44.80%	+5.35
Total		1,078	100.00%	

1912 Saskatchewan general election: Redberry electoral district
Party	Candidate	Votes	%	±%
Liberal	George Langley	1,014	66.10%	+10.90
Conservative	R.M. Pitts	520	33.90%	-10.90
Total		1,534	100.00%	

September 5, 1912 By-Election: Redberry electoral district
Party	Candidate	Votes	%	±%
Liberal	George Langley	Acclaimed	100.00%	
Total		Acclamation		

1917 Saskatchewan general election: Redberry electoral district
Party	Candidate	Votes	%	±%
Liberal	George Langley	2,146	65.87%	-
Conservative	John A. McKeen	1,029	31.58%	-
Independent	John Pitchko	83	2.55%	–
Total		3,258	100.00%	

1921 Saskatchewan general election: Redberry electoral district
Party	Candidate	Votes	%	±%
Independent	George Cockburn	1,837	53.65%	+51.10
Liberal	George Langley	1,587	46.35%	-19.52
Total		3,424	100.00%	

1925 Saskatchewan general election: Redberry electoral district
Party	Candidate	Votes	%	±%
Progressive	George Cockburn	2,085	57.77%	+4.12
Liberal	Emile Richard	1,524	42.23%	-4.12
Total		3,609	100.00%	

1929 Saskatchewan general election: Redberry electoral district
Party	Candidate	Votes	%	±%
Liberal	George Cockburn	1,360	31.06%	
Independent Liberal	George Langley	1,160	26.50	
Conservative	Samuel Robert Miller	1,021	23.32%	
Economic Group	William Fowlie	837	19.12%	
Total		4,378	100.00%	

=== 1938–2003 ===
1938 Saskatchewan general election: Redberry electoral district
Party	Candidate	Votes	%	±%
Liberal	Orest Zerebko	2,601	43.37%	-
Social Credit	Sheridan P. Porter	1,824	30.42%	–
Independent	Arnold Larsen	1,572	26.21%	-
Total		5,997	100.00%	

1944 Saskatchewan general election: Redberry electoral district
Party	Candidate	Votes	%	±%
CCF	Dmytro Lazorko	2,306	52.99%	–
Liberal	W. James Langley	1,285	29.53%	-13.84
Prog. Conservative	Ernest Wilson	662	15.21%	-
Independent	Peter J. Semko	99	2.27%	-23.94
Total		4,352	100.00%	

1948 Saskatchewan general election: Redberry electoral district
Party	Candidate	Votes	%	±%
Liberal	Bernard Korchinski	2,571	46.15%	+16.62
CCF	Dmytro Lazorko	2,357	42.31%	-10.68
Prog. Conservative	Robert C. Glen	643	11.54%	-3.67
Total		5,571	100.00%	

1952 Saskatchewan general election: Redberry electoral district
Party	Candidate	Votes	%	±%
CCF	Dmytro Zipchen	3,208	50.27%	+7.96
Liberal	Bernard Korchinski	3,174	49.73%	+3.58
Total		6,382	100.00%	

1956 Saskatchewan general election: Redberry electoral district
Party	Candidate	Votes	%	±%
Liberal	Bernard Korchinski	2,670	43.70%	-6.03
CCF	Dmytro Zipchen	2,482	40.63%	-9.64
Social Credit	Alex A. Postnikoff	957	15.67%	-
Total		6,109	100.00%	

1960 Saskatchewan general election: Redberry electoral district
Party	Candidate	Votes	%	±%
CCF	Dick Michayluk	2,358	41.23%	+0.60
Liberal	Bernard Korchinski	2,148	37.55%	-6.15
Prog. Conservative	Walter J. Dolynny	765	13.37%	-
Social Credit	John A. Bueckert	449	7.85%	-7.82
Total		5,720	100.00%	

1964 Saskatchewan general election: Redberry electoral district
Party	Candidate	Votes	%	±%
CCF	Dick Michayluk	2,200	40.51%	-0.72
Liberal	Bernard Korchinski	1,993	36.70%	-0.85
Prog. Conservative	Walter J. Dolynny	1,238	22.79%	+9.42
Total		5,431	100.00%	

1967 Saskatchewan general election: Redberry electoral district
Party	Candidate	Votes	%	±%
NDP	Dick Michayluk	2,365	45.33%	+4.82
Liberal	Steve Sulatisky	2,343	44.90%	+8.20
Prog. Conservative	Ed Thunderchild	510	9.77%	-13.02
Total		5,218	100.00%	

1971 Saskatchewan general election: Redberry electoral district
Party	Candidate	Votes	%	±%
NDP	Dick Michayluk	2,356	49.99%	+4.66
Liberal	Julius Liebaert	1,982	42.05%	-2.85
Prog. Conservative	Dale Ebert	375	7.96%	-1.81
Total		4,713	100.00%	

1975 Saskatchewan general election: Redberry electoral district
Party	Candidate	Votes	%	±%
NDP	Dennis Banda	2,783	42.02%	-7.97
Liberal	Emil Craig	2,006	30.28%	-11.77
Progressive Conservative	Nick E. Kowerchuk	1,835	27.70%	+19.74
Total		6,624	100.00%	

1978 Saskatchewan general election: Redberry electoral district
Party	Candidate	Votes	%	±%
NDP	Dennis Banda	3,325	49.39%	+7.37
Progressive Conservative	John Gerich	2,916	43.32%	+15.62
Liberal	Peter Bomok	491	7.29%	-22.99
Total		6,732	100.00%	

1982 Saskatchewan general election: Redberry electoral district
Party	Candidate	Votes	%	±%
Progressive Conservative	John Gerich	4,018	57.13%	+13.81
NDP	Dennis Banda	2,556	36.34%	-13.05
Western Canada Concept	Wayne Ratzlaff	303	4.31%	–
Liberal	Bernadine Droesse	156	2.22%	-5.07
Total		7,033	100.00%	

1986 Saskatchewan general election: Redberry electoral district
Party	Candidate	Votes	%	±%
Progressive Conservative	John Gerich	3,591	53.91%	-3.22
NDP	Dennis Banda	2,791	41.90%	+5.56
Liberal	Aurele Lalonde	279	4.19%	+1.97
Total		6,661	100.00%	

1991 Saskatchewan general election: Redberry electoral district
Party	Candidate	Votes	%	±%
NDP	Walt Jess	3,493	44.30%	+2.40
Prog. Conservative	John Gerich	3,206	40.67%	-13.24
Liberal	Ken Finlayson	1,185	15.03%	+10.84
Total		7,884	100.00%	

1995 Saskatchewan general election: Redberry Lake electoral district
Party	Candidate	Votes	%	±%
NDP	Walt Jess	3,232	42.94%	-1.36
Liberal	Richard Fyson	2,162	28.72%	+13.69
Prog. Conservative	Ron Meakin	2,133	28.34%	-12.33
Total		7,527	100.00%	

1999 Saskatchewan general election: Redberry Lake electoral district
Party	Candidate	Votes	%	±%
Saskatchewan	Randy Weekes	3,860	51.14%	–
NDP	Walt Jess	2,444	32.38%	-10.56
Liberal	Harry Lewchuk	1,082	14.33%	-14.39
New Green	Ivan Olynyk	162	2.15%	–
Total		7,548	100.00%	

== See also ==
- List of Saskatchewan provincial electoral districts
- List of Saskatchewan general elections
- Canadian provincial electoral districts
