= Donald Forrest MacDonald =

Canadian politician

Donald Forrest MacDonald (born September 1937) is a veterinarian and former political figure in Saskatchewan. He represented Moose Jaw North from 1971 to 1975 in the Legislative Assembly of Saskatchewan as a Liberal.

He was born in Shaunavon, Saskatchewan, the son of Tom MacDonald, and was educated in Moose Jaw and Brownlee. MacDonald received a DVM degree in Guelph, Ontario and moved back to Moose Jaw in 1961, where he operated the Moose Jaw Animal Clinic. He served on Moose Jaw City Council and on the board of the Moose Jaw Union Hospital. MacDonald also served on the board for the YM-YWCA, was a member of the Chamber of Commerce and served as vice-president of the Saskatchewan Veterinary Medical Association.
