= Sid Dutchak =

Canadian politician

Sidney Peter "Sid" Dutchak (born August 7, 1950) is a lawyer, consultant and former political figure in Saskatchewan, Canada. He represented Prince Albert-Duck Lake from 1983 to 1987 in the Legislative Assembly of Saskatchewan as a Progressive Conservative.

He was born in Blaine Lake, Saskatchewan, the son of Peter Dutchak and Susan Boulanoff, and was educated there and at the University of Saskatchewan. In 1973, Dutchak married Gerri Gail Epp. He served in the Saskatchewan cabinet as a minister without portfolio, as Minister of Justice and Attorney General and as Minister of Native and Northern Affairs. After leaving politics, he was named the head of the Saskatchewan Housing Corporation. From 2001 to 2007, Dutchak was president of Cordy Oilfield Services Inc. He then served as president and Chief Executive Officer of Golconda Resources Ltd. from 2008 to 2011.
