= Metro Rybchuk =

Canadian politician (1935–2021)

Metro Carl Rybchuk (December 16, 1935 – October 15, 2021) owned a catering company and was a political figure in Saskatchewan. He was elected as a Member of the Legislative Assembly for the province of Saskatchewan representing the constituency of Regina Victoria from 1982 to 1986 as a Progressive Conservative.

He was the son of Nick and Minny Rybchuk. In 1958, he married Eileen J. Klenk. Rybchuk defeated New Democrat MLA Henry Baker to become an MLA in the 1982 election and was defeated by Harry Van Mulligen in the 1986 election. He died on October 15, 2021, at the age of 85.
