= Gross Revenue Insurance Plan =

Canadian agricultural insurance policy

In Canadian agricultural policy, a Gross Revenue Insurance Plan (GRIP) is a form of direct payment combining a crop insurance component and a revenue protection component. Farmers finance one-third of the premiums paid out under the revenue protection component. The GRIP makes payments when market revenue falls short of a producer’s target revenue. Target revenue per acre for an individual crop is based on historical yields, a multi-year moving average of price, and a level of insurance coverage chosen by the producer.
