= Herbert Swan (Canadian politician) =

Canadian politician

18th Speaker of the Legislative Assembly of Saskatchewan
- In office 1982–1986
- Preceded by: John Brockelbank
- Succeeded by: Arnold Tusa

Personal details
- Born: January 10, 1927 Demaine, Saskatchewan, Canada
- Died: May 28, 2013 (aged 86) Saskatoon, Saskatchewan, Canada
- Party: Progressive Conservative Party
- Spouse: Anita Swan

Herbert Junior Swan (January 10, 1927 – May 28, 2013) was the 18th Speaker for the Legislative Assembly of Saskatchewan in Canada. He held this post from 1982 to 1986. A member of the Progressive Conservative Party of Saskatchewan, Swan represented the riding of Rosetown-Elrose.

The son of Herbert Swan, he was educated in Demaine, at the Saskatoon Technical Institute and Success Business College. Swan was a farmer and operated a grain seed business. In 1949, he married Anita Syroishka. Swan served on the local school board and was president of the Saskatchewan School Trustees' Association from 1976 to 1978. He served in the provincial cabinet as Minister of the Environment from 1986 to 1987 and as Minister of the Environment and Public Safety from 1987 to 1989. Swan retired from politics in 1991. He was later a resident of Beechy, Saskatchewan, and died in Saskatoon in 2013.
