= Glenn Hagel =

Canadian politician (born 1949)

The Honourable Glenn Hagel ECS

Member of the Legislative Assembly of Saskatchewan for Moose Jaw North
- In office 1986–1991
- Preceded by: Keith Parker
- Succeeded by: riding dissolved

Member of the Legislative Assembly of Saskatchewan for Moose Jaw Palliser
- In office 1991–1995
- Preceded by: new riding
- Succeeded by: riding dissolved

Member of the Legislative Assembly of Saskatchewan for Moose Jaw North
- In office 1995 – November 20, 2007
- Preceded by: riding recreated
- Succeeded by: Warren Michelson

Personal details
- Born: August 17, 1949 (age 77) Drumheller, Alberta, Canada
- Party: New Democratic Party
- Education: University of Manitoba University of Regina

Glenn Joseph Hagel (born August 17, 1949) is a Canadian provincial and municipal politician. He was a Saskatchewan New Democratic Party member of the Legislative Assembly of Saskatchewan from 1986 to 2007, representing the constituencies of Moose Jaw North or Moose Jaw Palliser at different times during his career. He also served as Speaker of the Legislative Assembly from 1996 to 1999.

He was born in Drumheller, Alberta and was educated at the University of Manitoba and the University of Regina. Before entering politics, Hagel worked as a counsellor, educator and coordinator for a number of organizations. He married Karen Gifco and they have two daughters, Kristin and Meredith, and three grandchildren, Juliet, Nora and Dexter.

Hagel served in the Saskatchewan cabinet as Minister of Post-Secondary Education and Skills Training, from 1999 to 2001, as Minister of Social Services from 2001 to 2003, as Minister of Gaming from 2002 to 2003 and from 2006 to 2007, as Minister of Community Resources and Employment in 2003, as Provincial Secretary from 2006 to 2007 and as Minister of Culture, Youth and Recreation from 2006 to 2007.

Provincially, Hagel's career ended after being narrowly defeated by the Saskatchewan Party's Warren Michelson.

He was elected mayor of Moose Jaw in the 2009 Saskatchewan municipal elections, and retired in 2012, deciding not to run for another term.
