= Prince Albert-Duck Lake =

Former provincial electoral district in Saskatchewan, Canada

Prince Albert-Duck Lake was a constituency of the Legislative Assembly of Saskatchewan from 1978 to 1991.

== History ==
In 1991, the district became part of Prince Albert Carlton.

== Geography ==
The district was based in Prince Albert and Duck Lake.

== Representation ==
- 20th Saskatchewan Legislature — Jerome Hammersmith
- 21st Saskatchewan Legislature — Eldon Lautermilch

== See also ==
- List of Saskatchewan provincial electoral districts
- List of Saskatchewan general elections
- Canadian provincial electoral districts
