= Henry Harold Peter Baker =

Canadian politician and educator

Henry Harold Peter Baker (November 24, 1915 – March 4, 2004) was an educator and political figure in Saskatchewan. He represented Regina East from 1964 to 1967, Regina South East from 1967 to 1971, Regina Wascana from 1971 to 1975 and Regina Victoria from 1975 to 1982 in the Legislative Assembly of Saskatchewan as a Co-operative Commonwealth Federation (CCF) and then New Democratic Party (NDP) member.

He was born in Lipton, Saskatchewan and was educated there and in Regina and at the Regina Teachers' College. He taught school for several years and then served in the Royal Canadian Air Force teaching aircraft personnel during World War II. In 1944, Baker became secretary of the Saskatchewan Public Service Commission. He served on the city council for Regina and was mayor from 1958 to 1970 and from 1973 to 1979, becoming the city's longest-serving mayor; he was defeated by Harry Walker when he ran for reelection in 1970. Baker was defeated by Metro Rybchuk when he ran for reelection to the Saskatchewan assembly in 1982. He died in Regina at the age of 88.

The Regina City Council chamber was renamed in his honour. The city also established the Henry Baker Scholarship Program.
