= Lloyd Hampton =

Canadian politician

MLA for Canora
- In office 1982–1985

Personal details
- Born: June 18, 1941 Tisdale, Saskatchewan
- Died: 2011
- Party: Western Canada Concept Party of Saskatchewan, Progressive Conservative Party of Saskatchewan

Lloyd Edward Hampton (June 18, 1941 – 2011) was a Canadian politician. He served in the Legislative Assembly of Saskatchewan from 1982 to 1985, as a Progressive Conservative member for the constituency of Canora.

He was briefly affiliated with the Western Canada Concept Party of Saskatchewan.
