= Jo-Ann Zazelenchuk =

Canadian politician

Jo-Ann Zazelenchuk (born October 15, 1958) is a former political figure in Saskatchewan, Canada. She represented Saskatoon Riversdale from 1982 to 1986 in the Legislative Assembly of Saskatchewan as a Progressive Conservative. At 23, she was the youngest member elected to the Saskatchewan assembly.

She was born in Saskatoon, Saskatchewan, the daughter of Leayor Zazelenchuk, and was educated at the University of Saskatchewan and the University of Calgary. Before entering politics, she worked as a real estate agent and gas station attendant. Zazelenchuk defeated Deputy Premier Roy Romanow by a small margin to win a provincial seat in 1982. She was heavily defeated by Romanow when she ran for re-election in 1986, taking only 26 percent of the vote.
