= Bernard Leo Korchinski =

Canadian politician

Bernard Korchinski

MLA for Redberry
- In office 1948–1952; 1956–1960

Personal details
- Born: December 25, 1905 Beaver Hills, Saskatchewan
- Died: October 13, 2006 (aged 100) Regina, Saskatchewan
- Political party: Saskatchewan Liberal Party
- Spouse: Slawka Marak
- Occupation: Educator

Bernard Leo Korchinski (December 25, 1905 – October 13, 2006) was an educator and political figure in Saskatchewan. He represented Redberry from 1948 to 1952 and from 1956 to 1960 in the Legislative Assembly of Saskatchewan as a Liberal.

He was born in Beaver Hills, Saskatchewan, the son of Lev Korchinski and Pauline Hryciw, both Ukrainian immigrants. Korchinski was educated at St. Joseph's College in Yorkton. He taught school for 39 years in various locations including Ituna, Holdfast, Hafford, Rama, Speers and Regina. He served in the Royal Canadian Air Force during World War II. Korchinski was provincial director of the Emergency Measures Organization and served as a judge for the Saskatchewan Citizenship Court. He was a member of the Knights of Columbus and a founding member of the Ukrainian Canadian Congress and the Ukrainian Catholic Brotherhood. Korchinski wrote articles for the Ukrainski Visti (English: "Ukrainian News") newspaper in Edmonton and authored the book Pioneer Bishop about Nykyta Budka. He married Slawka Marak. Korchinski was defeated by Dmytro Zipchen of the CCF when he ran for reelection to the provincial assembly in 1952. Korchinski defeated Zipchen in the 1956 provincial election, but was defeated by Dick Michayluk of the CCF in the 1960 election. He was awarded the Centennial Medal by the Commonwealth Parliamentary Association in 2005. Korchinski died the following year in Regina at the age of 100.
