= Myles Morin =

Canadian politician

Myles Leslie Morin (born February 16, 1954) is a financial services executive and former political figure in Saskatchewan, Canada. He represented The Battlefords from 1982 to 1986 in the Legislative Assembly of Saskatchewan as a Progressive Conservative.

He was born in Saskatoon, Saskatchewan, the son of George Morin, and was educated in Rosthern, at the University of Saskatchewan and at the University of Waterloo.

Morin served in the provincial cabinet as Minister of Revenue and Financial Services. He was defeated by Doug Anguish when he ran for reelection to the assembly in 1986.

In 2008, Morin was named vice-president responsible for Manulife Financial's operations in Hong Kong.
