= Regina Douglas Park =

Provincial electoral district in Saskatchewan, Canada

Saskatchewan electoral district
- Coordinates: 50.440°N 104.581°W

Provincial electoral district
- Legislature: Legislative Assembly of Saskatchewan
MLA
Nicole Sarauer
New Democratic
- First contested: 1975 as "Regina Victoria"
- Last contested: 2024

Demographics
- Electors: 10,846
- Communities: Regina

Regina Douglas Park is a provincial electoral district for the Legislative Assembly of Saskatchewan, Canada. Created for the 18th Saskatchewan general election as "Regina Victoria", it was redrawn and renamed "Regina Douglas Park" by the Representation Act, 2002 (Saskatchewan).

The riding contains the neighbourhoods of Arnheim Place, Gladmer Park, Al Ritchie, Assiniboia East, and Boot Hill.

== Members of the Legislative Assembly ==
Legislature	Years	Member	Party
Regina Victoria
18th	1975–1978	Henry Baker	New Democrat
19th	1978–1982	Henry Baker	New Democrat
20th	1982–1986	Metro Rybchuk	Progressive Conservative
21st	1986–1991	Harry Van Mulligen	New Democrat
22nd	1991–1995	Harry Van Mulligen	New Democrat
23rd	1995–1999	Harry Van Mulligen	New Democrat
24th	1999–2003	Harry Van Mulligen	New Democrat
Regina Douglas Park
25th	2003–2007	Harry Van Mulligen	New Democrat
26th	2007–2009	Harry Van Mulligen	New Democrat
26th	2009–2011	Dwain Lingenfelter	New Democrat
27th	2011–2016	Russ Marchuk	Saskatchewan Party
28th	2016–2020	Nicole Sarauer	New Democrat
29th	2020–2024	Nicole Sarauer	New Democrat
30th	2024-present	Nicole Sarauer	New Democrat

== Election results ==
2024 Saskatchewan general election
** Preliminary results — Not yet official **
Party	Candidate	Votes	%	±%
New Democratic	Nicole Sarauer	3,817	64.82	+4.0
Saskatchewan	Ken Grey	1,878	31.89	+2.1
Green	Victor Lau	194	3.29	-0.9
Total valid votes		5,889	99.41	
Total rejected ballots		35	0.59	
Turnout		5,924		
Eligible voters		–		
Source: Elections Saskatchewan
New Democratic notional gain from Saskatchewan		Swing		+1.0

2020 provincial election redistributed results
Party	%
New Democratic	60.8
Saskatchewan	29.8
Green	4.2
Liberal	0.1
Others	5.1

2020 Saskatchewan general election
Party	Candidate	Votes	%	±%
New Democratic	Nicole Sarauer	3,545	60.14	+10.31
Saskatchewan	Nadeem Naz	1,808	30.67	-8.23
Progressive Conservative	Sara Healey	331	5.61	-
Green	Victor Lau	211	3.58	-2.58
Total valid votes		5,895	98.88	
Total rejected ballots		67	1.12	–
Turnout		5,962	46.01	–
Eligible voters		12,958		
New Democratic hold		Swing		–
Source: Elections Saskatchewan

2016 Saskatchewan general election
Party	Candidate	Votes	%	±%
New Democratic	Nicole Sarauer	3,242	49.83	+8.49
Saskatchewan	C.J. Katz	2,531	38.90	-13.10
Green	Victor Lau	401	6.16	-0.50
Liberal	Curt Schroeder	332	5.10	-
Total valid votes		6,506	100.0	
Eligible voters		–		
New Democratic gain from Saskatchewan		Swing		–
Source: Elections Saskatchewan

2011 Saskatchewan general election
Party	Candidate	Votes	%	±%
Saskatchewan	Russ Marchuk	4,411	52.00	+9.85
New Democratic	Dwain Lingenfelter	3,507	41.34	-8.91
Green	Victor Lau	565	6.66	-0.94
Total		8,483	100.00	
Saskatchewan gain from New Democratic		Swing		–

2009 by-election

By-election, September 21, 2009 resignation of Harry Van Mulligen
Party	Candidate	Votes	%	±%
New Democratic	Dwain Lingenfelter	3,115	50.25	-1.77
Saskatchewan	Kathleen Peterson	2,613	42.15	+11.58
Green	Victor Lau	471	7.60	+3.76
Total		6,199	100.00	

2007 Saskatchewan general election
Party	Candidate	Votes	%	±%
New Democratic	Harry Van Mulligen	5,128	51.92	-5.34
Saskatchewan	Scott Simpkins	3,051	30.89	+9.71
Liberal	Nick Schenher	1,321	13.37	-5.62
Green	Victor Lau	377	3.82	+2.17
Total		9,877	100.00	
New Democratic hold		Swing		–

2003 Saskatchewan general election
Party	Candidate	Votes	%	±%
New Democratic	Harry Van Mulligen	5,136	57.26	+9.63
Saskatchewan	Laura Ross	1,900	21.18	-3.73
Liberal	Mike Farmer	1,703	18.99	-4.72
New Green	David Orban	148	1.65	-2.10
Progressive Conservative	Wayne Mastrachuk	83	0.92	-
Total		8,970	100.00	
New Democratic hold		Swing		–

=== Regina Victoria (1975–2003) ===
1999 Saskatchewan general election: Regina Victoria
Party	Candidate	Votes	%	±%
New Democratic	Harry Van Mulligen	3,231	47.63	-10.90
Saskatchewan	Terry Wall	1,690	24.91	*
Liberal	John Knight	1,608	23.71	-10.08
New Green	Jim Elliott	254	3.75	*
Total		6,783	100.00	
New Democratic hold		Swing		–

1995 Saskatchewan general election: Regina Victoria
Party	Candidate	Votes	%	±%
New Democratic	Harry Van Mulligen	4,294	58.53	-6.73
Liberal	Laura Ross	2,479	33.79	+10.38
Progressive Conservative	Patricia Costanza	563	7.68	-3.65
Total		7,336	100.00	
New Democratic hold		Swing		–

1991 Saskatchewan general election: Regina Victoria
Party	Candidate	Votes	%	±%
New Democratic	Harry Van Mulligen	5,759	65.26	+6.03
Liberal	Louise Holloway	2,066	23.41	+8.99
Progressive Conservative	Olga Stinson	1,000	11.33	-15.02
Total		8,825	100.00	
New Democratic hold		Swing		–

1986 Saskatchewan general election: Regina Victoria
Party	Candidate	Votes	%	±%
New Democratic	Harry Van Mulligen	4,782	59.23	+16.69
Progressive Conservative	Metro Rybchuk	2,128	26.35	-23.41
Liberal	Alvey Halbgewachs	1,164	14.42	+10.36
Total		8,074	100.00	
New Democratic gain from Progressive Conservative		Swing		–

1982 Saskatchewan general election: Regina Victoria
Party	Candidate	Votes	%	±%
Progressive Conservative	Metro Rybchuk	4,108	49.76	+23.81
New Democratic	Henry Baker	3,512	42.54	-18.16
Liberal	Steve Bata	335	4.06	-9.29
Western Canada Concept	Barbara Duff	184	2.23	*
Independent	Jim Harding	117	1.41	*
Total		8,256	100.00	
Progressive Conservative gain from New Democratic		Swing		–

1978 Saskatchewan general election: Regina Victoria
Party	Candidate	Votes	%	±%
New Democratic	Henry Baker	3,729	60.70	+8.00
Progressive Conservative	Andrew G. Shepherd	1,594	25.95	+5.66
Liberal	Glenn Caleval	820	13.35	-13.66
Total		6,143	100.00	
New Democratic hold		Swing		–

1975 Saskatchewan general election: Regina Victoria
Party	Candidate	Votes	%	±%
New Democratic	Henry Baker	3,577	52.70	*
Liberal	Graham Wolk	1,833	27.01	*
Progressive Conservative	Fred L. Dunbar	1,377	20.29	*
Total		6,787	100.00	

== See also ==
- List of Saskatchewan provincial electoral districts
- List of Saskatchewan general elections
- Canadian provincial electoral districts
