= Jerome Hammersmith =

Canadian politician (1938–2021)

Jerome A. Hammersmith (October 10, 1938 – December 19, 2021) was an American writer, educator, consultant and political figure in Saskatchewan. He represented Prince Albert-Duck Lake from 1978 to 1983 in the Legislative Assembly of Saskatchewan as a New Democratic Party (NDP) member.

Jerry Hammersmith was born in Melfort, Saskatchewan, the son of Alvin (Allie) and Molly Hammersmith of Gronlid, Sask. After spending time as a farmer, logger, miner, construction worker and lineman, he married Shelby Smith. The couple had a daughter and divorced in 1968.

Hammersmith studied at the University of Saskatchewan, receiving a Bachelor of Education (B.Ed.) with Great Distinction and Master of Education (M.Ed.), both in Indian and Northern Education. An outfitter and bush pilot between 1967 and 1972, Hammersmith was president of the Northern Saskatchewan Outfitters Association. Between 1973 and 1978, he was a consultant with the James Smith First Nation and then the Federation of Saskatchewan Indians. He married Bernice Michelle Jacobson and they had a daughter and two sons.

Hammersmith ran unsuccessfully for a seat in the provincial assembly in a 1977 by-election before being elected in 1978. He served in the Blakeney cabinet as Minister for Northern Saskatchewan. His re-election in 1982 was declared void and he was defeated in the by-election that followed in 1983.

Beginning in 1983, Hammersmith worked as a national and international Management, Education and Business Consultant, sequentially with Meadow Lake Tribal Council in Saskatchewan, Assembly of First Nations in Ottawa, clients in five other Canadian provinces and three Territories, as well as in Zimbabwe and New Zealand. He noticed his first M.S. symptoms in 1985 and it was officially diagnosed in 1994. Divorced in 1995, he married Joan Margaret Brooks in 2004. In their melded family, they have six children, three step-children, seventeen grandchildren and two great-grandchildren. Defying his M.S. and beginning doctoral studies in 2003, Hammersmith earned a Doctor of Education [D.Ed.). in Comparative Education from the University of South Africa in 2007.

Hammersmith taught at universities in Saskatchewan and New Zealand, and also in the First Nations Forum, the Gabriel Dumont Institute and the Dumont Technical Institute, all in Saskatchewan. He also served as a volunteer adviser on Aboriginal and Developing Nation projects with the Canadian Executive Service Organization. He served on the Faculty of the Aboriginal Leadership and Management Program at the Banff Centre in Alberta from 2005 to 2015 and continues as a Saskatoon freelance writer of both fiction and non-fiction.

Hammersmith died of natural causes on December 19, 2021, at the age of 83.
