= John Gerich =

Canadian politician

John Gerich (b. 1947) was a politician in Saskatchewan, Canada, MLA for Redberry, and former member of the Royal Canadian Mounted Police. He served as Associate Minister of Economic Development in the Saskatchewan Progressive Conservative government led by Grant Devine.

Gerich was involved in the biggest political corruption scandal in Saskatchewan history, in which dummy companies provided receipts for false expense claims. Gerich was convicted of fraud in 1997 for taking money illegally from his MLA communications allowance. He was sentenced to two years in jail and fined CDN $12,000.

After his release he worked as a truck driver in the Alberta oilpatch.
