= Evelyn Bacon =

Canadian politician

Evelyn Louise Bacon (November 25, 1949 – April 7, 2025) was a businessperson and former political figure in Saskatchewan, Canada. She represented Saskatoon Nutana from 1982 to 1986 in the Legislative Assembly of Saskatchewan as a Progressive Conservative.

She was born Evelyn Louise Foster in Kerrobert, Saskatchewan, the daughter of Wilfred Foster, and was educated at the University of Saskatchewan. In 1970, she married David James Bacon. Bacon lived in Saskatoon.
