= Gordon Gray Currie =

Canadian politician

MLA for Regina Wascana
- In office 1982–1986

Personal details
- Born: May 20, 1923 Semans, Saskatchewan, Canada
- Died: February 22, 2017 (aged 93)
- Party: Progressive Conservative Party of Saskatchewan
- Occupation: teacher, football executive/coach

Gordon Gray Currie (May 20, 1923 – February 22, 2017) was a political figure in Saskatchewan, Canada. He represented Regina Wascana from 1982 to 1986 in the Legislative Assembly of Saskatchewan as a Progressive Conservative.

He was born in Semans, Saskatchewan, the son of Robert Currie and Mary Anne Pool, and was educated in Saskatchewan, in British Columbia, at Notre Dame Collegiate and at Mount Allison University. Currie served in the Royal Canadian Navy during World War II, returning to Regina in 1947. Currie taught school at Balfour Technical School there and coached the football and hockey teams. In 1953, he married Shirley Corinne Clarke. From 1965 to 1976, Currie coached the Regina Rams football club. He led the Rams to eight Manitoba-Saskatchewan Junior League championships, seven Western Canada Junior championships and six national junior titles. In 1975, he was named Canadian Amateur Coach of the Year. He then returned to teaching and later served as a high school principal at Campbell Collegiate in Regina, Saskatchewan.

Currie served in the Saskatchewan cabinet as Minister of Advanced Education and Manpower, as Minister of Continuing Education, as Minister of Education, as Minister of Science and Technology and as Minister of Telephones. He was dropped from cabinet in December 1985 and he did not seek reelection in 1986.

He was named to the Saskatchewan Sports Hall of Fame in 1978, to the Order of Canada in 1979 and to the Canadian Football Hall of Fame in 2005. In 1977, he established the Gordon Currie Foundation which awards the Gordon Currie Youth Development Fund.

Currie died on February 22, 2017, aged 93.
