= Robert Edward William Myers =

Canadian politician

Robert Edward William Myers (January 14, 1947 – January 28, 2008) was a mine designer and political figure in Saskatchewan. He represented Saskatoon South from 1982 to 1986 in the Legislative Assembly of Saskatchewan as a Progressive Conservative.

He was born in Saskatoon, Saskatchewan and was educated there. In 1971, he married Jo Anne McFadyen. Myers worked for INCO in Thompson, Manitoba and for AMOK in Cluff Lake mine, Saskatchewan. He served on the city council for Thompson. Myers served as legislative secretary for the Minister of Energy and Mines. He later worked as a mine inspector for the Saskatchewan civil service.
