= Saskatoon Buena Vista =

Former provincial electoral district in Saskatchewan, Canada

Saskatoon Buena Vista was a constituency of the Legislative Assembly of Saskatchewan. Long serving New Democratic Party MLA Herman Rolfes represented the district throughout its entire existence from 1975 to 1982.

== Geography ==
The seat was named after the residential neighbourhood of Buena Vista.

== Representation ==
- Herman Rolfes (1975–1982)

== See also ==
- List of Saskatchewan provincial electoral districts
- List of Saskatchewan general elections
- Canadian provincial electoral districts
