= Keith Parker =

Canadian politician

Keith Edward Parker (born January 30, 1945) is an insurance agent and former political figure in Saskatchewan, Canada. He represented Moose Jaw North from 1982 to 1986 in the Legislative Assembly of Saskatchewan as a Progressive Conservative.

He was born in Moose Jaw, Saskatchewan, the son of Ernest E. Parker, and was educated at the University of Saskatchewan and the University of Regina. In 1965, Parker married Darlene Marie Anhorn. He was defeated by Glenn Hagel when he ran for reelection to the provincial assembly in 1986.
