= Gary Lane (politician) =

Canadian politician

John Gary Lane KC , (born May 2, 1942), commonly known as Gary Lane, is a retired judge and former political figure in the Canadian province of Saskatchewan. He represented Lumsden from 1971 to 1975 and Qu'Appelle from 1975 to 1976 as a Liberal and then Qu'Appelle from 1976 to 1982 and Qu'Appelle-Lumsden from 1982 to 1991 as a Progressive Conservative in the Legislative Assembly of Saskatchewan.

He was born in Saskatoon, Saskatchewan, the son of Richard Louis Lane and Kathleen May Flanagan, and was educated in Saskatoon and at the University of Saskatchewan, where he received a Bachelor of Laws degree. Lane articled in Saskatoon and was called to the Saskatchewan bar in 1966. He worked as a Crown solicitor in the Saskatchewan Department of the Attorney General and executive assistant to the Attorney General from 1969 to 1971. Lane then practised law in Regina. He married Elizabeth Mary McLaughlin in 1979. In 1982, he was named Queen's Counsel (now King's Counsel, on the accession of Charles III).

In October 1976, Lane left the Liberal party. He served as president of the Progressive Conservative Party of Saskatchewan. Lane served in the provincial cabinet as Attorney General, as Provincial Secretary, as Minister of Telephones, as Minister of Intergovernmental Affairs, as Minister of Justice and Attorney General, as Minister of Finance and as Minister of Revenue and Financial Services. He resigned from cabinet and vacated his seat in September 1991.

Later that same month, he was named to the Saskatchewan Court of Appeal.

== Electoral history ==
1971 Saskatchewan general election: Lumsden electoral district
Party	Candidate	Votes	%	±%
Liberal	Gary Lane	2,875	46.48%	-1.65
NDP	Cliff Thurston	2,743	44.34%	+8.16
Prog. Conservative	C. Robin Hahn	568	9.18%	-6.51
Total		6,186	100.00%	

1975 Saskatchewan general election: Qu'Appelle electoral district
Party	Candidate	Votes	%	±%
Liberal	Gary Lane	3,796	42.03%	-4.45
NDP	Donald W. Cody	3,430	37.97%	-6.37
Prog. Conservative	F. Warren Denzin	1,806	20.00%	+10.82
Total		9,032	100.00%	

1978 Saskatchewan general election: Qu'Appelle electoral district
Party	Candidate	Votes	%	±%
Progressive Conservative	Gary Lane	7,231	46.30%	+26.30
NDP	Greg Willows	6,844	43.83%	+5.86
Liberal	J. Don McCullough	1,541	9.87%	-32.16
Total		15,616	100.00%	

1982 Saskatchewan general election: Qu'Appelle-Lumsden
Party	Candidate	Votes	%	±%
Progressive Conservative	Gary Lane	5,643	65.77%	+19.47
NDP	Tom Usherwood	2,372	27.65%	-16.18
Western Canada Concept	Allan Smith	346	4.03%	–
Liberal	Cheryl Stadnyk	219	2.55%	-7.32
Total		8,580	100.00%	

1986 Saskatchewan general election: Qu'Appelle-Lumsden
Party	Candidate	Votes	%	±%
Progressive Conservative	Gary Lane	4,490	47.55%	-18.22
NDP	Suzanne Murray	3,763	39.86%	+12.21
Liberal	Linda Boxall	1,150	12.18%	+9.63
Western Canada Concept	Joey Gargol	39	0.41%	-3.62
Total		9,442	100.00%	
