= 19th Saskatchewan Legislature =

Saskatchewan Dormitory

The 19th Legislative Assembly of Saskatchewan was elected in the Saskatchewan general election held in October 1978. The assembly sat from February 22, 1979, to March 29, 1982. The New Democratic Party (NDP) led by Allan Blakeney formed the government. The Progressive Conservative Party led by Richard Collver formed the official opposition. Eric Berntson replaced Collver as party leader in 1979.

John Edward Brockelbank served as speaker for the assembly.

== Members of the Assembly ==
The following members were elected to the assembly in 1978:

Electoral district	Member	Party	First elected / previously elected	No.# of term(s)
Arm River	Gerald Muirhead	Progressive Conservative	1978	1st term
Assiniboia-Gravelbourg	Allen Willard Engel	New Democratic Party	1971, (Note: Notukeu-Willow Bunch) 1978	2nd term*
Athabasca	Frederick John Thompson	New Democratic Party	1975	2nd term
Bengough-Milestone	Robert Hugh Pickering	Progressive Conservative	1978	1st term
Biggar	Elwood Lorrie Cowley	New Democratic Party	1971	3rd term
Canora	Al Matsalla	New Democratic Party	1967	4th term
Cumberland	Norman H. MacAuley	New Democratic Party	1975	2nd term
Cut Knife-Lloydminster	Robert Gavin Long	New Democratic Party	1978	1st term
Estevan	Robert Austin Larter	Progressive Conservative	1975	2nd term
Estevan	John Otho Chapman (1980)	New Democratic Party	1980	1st term
Humboldt	Edwin Laurence Tchorzewski	New Democratic Party	1971	3rd term
Indian Head-Wolseley	Douglas Graham Taylor	Progressive Conservative	1978	1st term
Kelsey-Tisdale	John Rissler Messer	New Democratic Party	1967	4th term
Kelsey-Tisdale	Neal Herbert Hardy (1980)	Progressive Conservative	1980	1st term
Kelvington-Wadena	Neil Erland Byers	New Democratic Party	1969	4th term
Kindersley	Robert Lynal Andrew	Progressive Conservative	1978	1st term
Kinistino	Donald William Cody	New Democratic Party	1971, (Note: Watrous) 1978	2nd term*
Last Mountain-Touchwood	Gordon S. MacMurchy	New Democratic Party	1971	3rd term
Maple Creek	Joan Duncan	Progressive Conservative	1978	1st term
Meadow Lake	George Malcolm McLeod	Progressive Conservative	1978	1st term
Melfort	Norman Vickar	New Democratic Party	1975	2nd term
Melville	John Russell Kowalchuk	New Democratic Party	1967	4th term
Moose Jaw North	John Leroy Skoberg	New Democratic Party	1975	2nd term
Moose Jaw South	Gordon Taylor Snyder	New Democratic Party	1960	6th term
Moosomin	Larry Birkbeck	Progressive Conservative	1975	2nd term
Morse	Reginald John Gross	New Democratic Party	1971, (Note: Gravelbourg) 1978	2nd term*
Nipawin	Richard Lee Collver	Progressive Conservative	1975	2nd term
Nipawin	Richard Lee Collver	Independent	1975	2nd term
Nipawin	Richard Lee Collver	Unionest	1975	2nd term
Pelly	Norm Lusney	New Democratic Party	1977	2nd term
Prince Albert	Mike Feschuk	New Democratic Party	1971	3rd term
Prince Albert-Duck Lake	Jerome Hammersmith	New Democratic Party	1978	1st term
Qu'Appelle	John Gary Lane	Progressive Conservative	1971 (Note: First elected as a Liberal)	3rd term
Quill Lakes	Murray James Koskie	New Democratic Party	1975	2nd term
Redberry	Dennis Banda	New Democratic Party	1975	2nd term
Regina Centre	Edward Blain Shillington	New Democratic Party	1975	2nd term
Regina Elphinstone	Allan Emrys Blakeney	New Democratic Party	1960	6th term
Regina Lakeview	Douglas Francis McArthur	New Democratic Party	1978	1st term
Regina North East	Walter Smishek	New Democratic Party	1964	5th term
Regina North West	Edward Charles Whelan	New Democratic Party	1960	6th term
Regina North West	John Lewis Solomon (1979)	New Democratic Party	1979	1st term
Regina Rosemont	Bill Allen	New Democratic Party	1975	2nd term
Regina South	Paul Emile Rousseau	Progressive Conservative	1978	1st term
Regina Victoria	Henry Harold Peter Baker	New Democratic Party	1964	5th term
Regina Wascana	Clinton Oliver White	New Democratic Party	1978	1st term
Rosetown-Elrose	Herbert Swan	Progressive Conservative	1978	1st term
Rosthern	Ralph Katzman	Progressive Conservative	1975	2nd term
Saltcoats	Ed Kaeding	New Democratic Party	1971	3rd term
Saskatoon Buena Vista	Herman Rolfes	New Democratic Party	1971	3rd term
Saskatoon Centre	Paul Peter Mostoway	New Democratic Party	1971	3rd term
Saskatoon Eastview	Bernard John Poniatowski	New Democratic Party	1978	1st term
Saskatoon Mayfair	Beverly Milton Dyck	New Democratic Party	1971	3rd term
Saskatoon Nutana	Wesley Albert Robbins	New Democratic Party	1964, 1971	4th term*
Saskatoon Riversdale	Roy John Romanow	New Democratic Party	1967	4th term
Saskatoon Sutherland	Peter W. Prebble	New Democratic Party	1978	1st term
Saskatoon Westmount	John Edward Brockelbank	New Democratic Party	1964	5th term
Shaunavon	Dwain Matthew Lingenfelter	New Democratic Party	1978	1st term
Shellbrook	George Reginald Anderson Bowerman	New Democratic Party	1967	4th term
Souris-Cannington	Eric Arthur Berntson	Progressive Conservative	1975	2nd term
Swift Current	Dennis Marvin Ham	Progressive Conservative	1975	2nd term
Swift Current	Dennis Marvin Ham	Independent	1975	2nd term
Swift Current	Dennis Marvin Ham	Unionest	1975	2nd term
The Battlefords	Eiling Kramer	New Democratic Party	1952	8th term
The Battlefords	David Manly Miner (1980)	New Democratic Party	1980	1st term
Thunder Creek	Wilbert Colin Thatcher	Progressive Conservative	1975	2nd term
Turtleford	Lloyd Emmett Johnson	New Democratic Party	1975	2nd term
Weyburn	James Auburn Pepper	New Democratic Party	1964	5th term
Wilkie	James William Arthur Garner	Progressive Conservative	1978	1st term
Yorkton	Randall Neil Nelson	New Democratic Party	1975	2nd term

== Party Standings ==
Affiliation	Members
New Democratic Party	44
Progressive Conservative	17
Total	61
Government Majority	27

== By-elections ==
By-elections were held to replace members for various reasons:

Electoral district	Member elected	Party	Election date	Reason
Regina North West	John Lewis Solomon	New Democratic Party	October 17, 1979	EC Whelan retired from politics
Estevan	John Otho Chapman	New Democratic Party	November 26, 1980	RA Larter resigned seat due to poor health
Kelsey-Tisdale	Neal Herbert Hardy	Progressive Conservative	November 26, 1980	JR Messer resigned seat
The Battlefords	David Manly Miner	New Democratic Party	November 26, 1980	E Kramer retired from politics
