= Weyburn-Bengough =

Provincial electoral district in Saskatchewan, Canada

Coordinates: 49°35′N 104°55′W

Saskatchewan electoral district

Provincial electoral district
- Legislature: Legislative Assembly of Saskatchewan
MLA
Michael Weger
Saskatchewan
- District created: 1994
- First contested: 1995
- Last contested: 2024

Demographics
- Electors: 9,784
- Census division: Division 2
- Census subdivision: Weyburn

Weyburn-Bengough is a provincial electoral district for the Legislative Assembly of Saskatchewan, Canada. Located in southeastern Saskatchewan, the constituency was created as Weyburn-Big Muddy for the 1995 general election by combining parts of Weyburn and Bengough-Milestone.

The largest centre in the constituency is the city of Weyburn (pop. 9,433). Smaller communities in the district include the towns of Willow Bunch, Coronach, Ogema and Bengough; and the villages of Minton, Pangman and Mctaggart.

For the 2024 general election, the riding was renamed Weyburn-Bengough and shifted to the north, gaining significant territory from Indian Head-Milestone, Lumsden-Morse, and Moosomin and losing territory to Estevan-Big Muddy and Cannington.

== Members of the Legislative Assembly ==
| Legislature | Years | Member | Party |
|---|---|---|---|
Weyburn-Big Muddy
| 23rd | 1995–1999 | Judy Bradley | New Democratic |
| 24th | 1999–2003 | Brenda Bakken | Saskatchewan Party |
| 25th | 2003–2006 | Brenda Bakken | Saskatchewan Party |
| 25th | 2006–2007 | Dustin Duncan | Saskatchewan Party |
| 26th | 2007–2011 | Dustin Duncan | Saskatchewan Party |
| 27th | 2011–2016 | Dustin Duncan | Saskatchewan Party |
| 28th | 2016–2020 | Dustin Duncan | Saskatchewan Party |
| 29th | 2020–2024 | Dustin Duncan | Saskatchewan Party |
Weyburn-Bengough
| 30th | 2024-present | Michael Weger | Saskatchewan Party |

== Election results ==
=== Weyburn-Bengough ===
2024 Saskatchewan general election
| Party | Candidate | Votes | % | ±% |
|---|---|---|---|---|
| Saskatchewan | Michael Weger | 5,785 | 66.76 | -9.84 |
| New Democratic | Seth Lendrum | 1,575 | 18.18 | +3.58 |
| Saskatchewan United | Rose McInnes | 1,092 | 12.60 | – |
| Green | North Hunter | 119 | 1.37 | +0.17 |
| Buffalo | Andrew Shanaida | 94 | 1.08 | -6.12 |
| Total valid votes | | 8,665 | 99.52 | |
| Total rejected ballots | | 42 | 0.48 | |
| Turnout | | 8,707 | 62.33 | |
| Eligible voters | | 13,969 | | |
| Saskatchewan hold | | Swing | | |
Source: Elections Saskatchewan

2020 provincial election redistributed results
| Party | % |
|---|---|
| Saskatchewan | 76.6 |
| New Democratic | 14.6 |
| Buffalo | 7.2 |
| Green | 1.2 |

=== Weyburn-Big Muddy ===
2020 Saskatchewan general election: Weyburn-Big Muddy
| Party | Candidate | Votes | % | ±% |
|---|---|---|---|---|
| Saskatchewan | Dustin Duncan | 5,972 | 77.00 | -1.73 |
| New Democratic | Regan Lanning | 1,021 | 13.17 | -2.89 |
| Buffalo | Collin Keith | 673 | 8.68 | * |
| Green | Shane Caellaigh | 89 | 1.15 | -0.82 |
| Total valid votes | | 7,755 | 99.56 | |
| Total rejected ballots | | 34 | 0.44 | – |
| Turnout | | 7,789 | – | – |
| Eligible voters | | – | | |
| Saskatchewan hold | | Swing | | – |
Source: Elections Saskatchewan

2016 Saskatchewan general election: Weyburn-Big Muddy
| Party | Candidate | Votes | % | ±% |
|---|---|---|---|---|
| Saskatchewan | Dustin Duncan | 6,177 | 78.73 | +3.02 |
| New Democratic | Karen Wormsbecker | 1,260 | 16.06 | -6.06 |
| Green | Barry Dickie | 155 | 1.97 | -0.20 |
| Progressive Conservative | Glenn Pohl | 131 | 1.66 | - |
| Liberal | Dylan Hart | 122 | 1.55 | - |
| Total valid votes | | 7,845 | 100.0 | |
| Eligible voters | | – | | |
Source: Elections Saskatchewan

2011 Saskatchewan general election
| Party | Candidate | Votes | % | ±% |
|---|---|---|---|---|
| Saskatchewan | Dustin Duncan | 5,194 | 75.71 | +15.00 |
| New Democratic Party | Ken Kessler | 1,517 | 22.12 | -3.03 |
| Green | Gene Ives | 149 | 2.17 | +0.29 |
| Total | | 6,860 | 100.00 | |

2007 Saskatchewan general election
| Party | Candidate | Votes | % | ±% |
|---|---|---|---|---|
| Saskatchewan | Dustin Duncan | 4,972 | 60.71 | +11.70 |
| New Democratic Party | Sharon Elliott | 2,060 | 25.15 | +1.30 |
| Liberal | Colleen Christopherson-Cote | 1,004 | 12.26 | -14.88 |
| Green | Al Birchard | 154 | 1.88 | * |
| Total | | 8,190 | 100.00 | |

June 19, 2006 By-Election: Weyburn-Big Muddy
| Party | Candidate | Votes | % | ±% |
|---|---|---|---|---|
| Saskatchewan | Dustin Duncan | 3,585 | 49.01% | +3.89% |
| Liberal | David Karwacki | 1,985 | 27.14% | +12.90% |
| New Democratic Party | Graham Mickleborough | 1,745 | 23.85% | -16.79% |
| Total | | 7,315 | 100.00% | 0.1% |

2003 Saskatchewan general election
| Party | Candidate | Votes | % | ±% |
|---|---|---|---|---|
| Saskatchewan | Brenda Bakken | 3,876 | 45.12 | -3.33 |
| New Democratic Party | Sherry Leach | 3,491 | 40.64 | +5.66 |
| Liberal | Janet Ledingham | 1,223 | 14.24 | -2.33 |
| Total | | 8,590 | 100.00 | |

1999 Saskatchewan general election
| Party | Candidate | Votes | % | ±% |
|---|---|---|---|---|
| Saskatchewan | Brenda Bakken | 4,015 | 48.45 | * |
| New Democratic Party | Judy Bradley | 2,899 | 34.98 | -7.19 |
| Liberal | Joseph Weisgerber | 1,373 | 16.57 | -11.98 |
| Total | | 8,287 | 100.00 | |

1995 Saskatchewan general election
| Party | Candidate | Votes | % | ±% |
|---|---|---|---|---|
| New Democratic Party | Judy Bradley | 3,506 | 42.17 | * |
| Prog. Conservative | Brenda Bakken | 2,434 | 29.28 | * |
| Liberal | Hugh Kimball | 2,373 | 28.55 | * |
| Total | | 8,313 | 100.00 | |

Source: Elections Saskatchewan: Constituency Vote Summaries – Historical

== See also ==
- List of Saskatchewan provincial electoral districts
- List of Saskatchewan general elections
- Canadian provincial electoral districts
