= Grant Devine =

11th Premier of Saskatchewan from 1982 to 1991

The Honourable Grant Devine ECS SOM
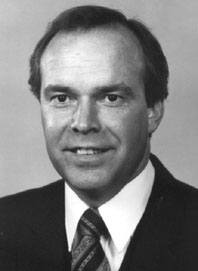
- Grant Devine

11th Premier of Saskatchewan
- In office May 8, 1982 – November 1, 1991
- Monarch: Elizabeth II
- Lieutenant Governor: Irwin McIntosh; Frederick Johnson; Sylvia Fedoruk
- Preceded by: Allan Blakeney
- Succeeded by: Roy Romanow

Saskatchewan Leader of the Opposition
- In office November 1, 1991 – October 8, 1992
- Preceded by: Roy Romanow
- Succeeded by: Richard Swenson

Member of the Legislative Assembly of Saskatchewan
- In office April 26, 1982 – June 21, 1995
- Preceded by: John Otho Chapman
- Succeeded by: Larry Ward
- Constituency: Estevan

Personal details
- Born: Donald Grant Devine; July 5, 1944 (age 82) Regina, Saskatchewan, Canada
- Party: Progressive Conservative Party of Saskatchewan

Donald Grant Devine SOM (born July 5, 1944) is a Canadian politician who served as the 11th premier of Saskatchewan from 1982 to 1991. He led the Progressive Conservative Party of Saskatchewan from 1979 to 1992.

Prior to entering politics, Devine taught agricultural marketing and consumer economics at the University of Saskatchewan. After being elected leader of the Progressive Conservatives (PCs) in 1979, he led the party to victory in the 1982 election. Devine's tenure was marked by tax reductions, privatization of state-owned companies, increased financial support for farmers, and the quadrupling of the provincial debt. Devine's PCs were re-elected in 1986 but lost power in the 1991 election. Devine later sought a federal nomination with the Conservative Party, but his candidacy was declined by the party; he subsequently ran unsuccessfully as an independent in the 2004 federal election.

Devine's tenure as Premier left a contentious legacy in the province. When Devine lost office in 1991, he was the fourth-longest serving premier in Saskatchewan history. He is noted for implementing neoliberal economic policy in Saskatchewan, shifting the province towards a market-based economic outlook and away from the economic planning that marked decades of Co-operative Commonwealth and New Democratic Party governance. However, when the PCs lost the 1991 election, the province was on the brink of bankruptcy. The unpopularity of Devine and the PCs in the 1990s, which was further exacerbated in the middle of that decade by revelations of a major expense fraud scandal, contributed directly to the founding of the Saskatchewan Party as a new conservative political party in the province. Observers have noted that Devine's party largely staked its success on a growing divide between urban and rural interests in the province, contributing to a deepening of that divide.

== Early life ==
Born in Regina, Saskatchewan on 5 July 1944, Devine was raised on his grandfather's farm near Lake Valley. He received a bachelor's degree in Agriculture from the University of Saskatchewan in 1967, a master's degree in Agricultural Economics from the University of Alberta in 1970, and a PhD in Agricultural Economics from Ohio State University in 1976. Devine taught agricultural marketing and consumer economics at the University of Saskatchewan from 1976 to 1979.

== Entry into politics ==
Devine's first foray into politics came during the 1978 provincial election when he ran for the Progressive Conservatives in the riding of Saskatoon Nutana. Although Devine was defeated, the PCs under leader Dick Collver won 17 seats and became the Official Opposition in their best showing since 1929. Despite the success, Collver resigned as leader in 1979 and Devine decided to run to replace him. In November 1979, Devine was chosen as the new PC leader. The following November, Devine contested a by-election in the riding of Estevan, losing a close three-way race by 60 votes.

=== 1982 election ===
Devine led the Progressive Conservatives in the 1982 election against the governing New Democratic Party (NDP), led by Premier Allan Blakeney, who had been in office since 1971. Running under the slogan, "There's so much more we can be", Devine campaigned on promoting free enterprise, eliminating the gasoline tax, and guaranteeing home mortgage rates at 13.25 percent; interest rates under the NDP government were then at 18 percent. Devine's campaign was considered populist, and he worked to project what has been described as a "folksy, down-home image". The election result on 26 April was a landslide victory for the Progressive Conservatives, who won 55 out of 64 seats and 54 percent of the popular vote. Devine won the Estevan seat and became the second Progressive Conservative premier in Saskatchewan history, with the party forming government for the first time since James Anderson was premier from 1929 to 1934, and for the first time ever as a majority. Devine's PCs were notably inexperienced in government—only fifteen MLAs were incumbents, and none had experience in government.

== Premier of Saskatchewan (1982–1991) ==
Devine took office after more than a decade of NDP government marked by state-led economic development, particularly in the realm of natural resources, and an expansion of public services and healthcare. His campaign made clear that his government would favour private over state-led investment. However, observers have noted that early on Devine's government "lacked ideological clarity"—although it did cut taxes, it also spent quite freely. In fact, commentators have noted a distinct difference in approach between Devine's first term in office from 1982 to 1986, and his second term after being re-elected in 1986. The latter term was marked by a close relationship with Brian Mulroney's federal Progressive Conservatives, and a fuller embrace of neoliberal economic policy, exemplified most clearly in Devine's austerity policies and privatization agenda.

=== Economic policies ===
One of Devine's first actions as premier was to organize an "Open for Business" conference in October 1982 to emphasize free enterprise and private investment in Saskatchewan and the fact that the "socialist" era in the province, represented by the NDP, was over. His government honoured its pledge to eliminate the 20 percent gasoline tax and lowered interest rates.

When the Devine government took office, the provincial budget was balanced. The Devine government ran consecutive deficit budgets—the deficit peaked in fiscal year 1986–87 at $1.2 billion—as a result of their policies of tax cuts and rebates, mortgage subsidies, drastic increases in election spending, and multi-million dollar investments in several money-losing megaprojects. During Devine's premiership, Saskatchewan's debt grew from $3.5 billion to $15 billion in fiscal year 1991–1992; by this time, annual interest payments had exceeded $500 million and were the third-largest component in the budget after health and education. This left the province facing the prospect of bankruptcy.

As part of a bid to deal with the worsening financial situation, Devine's PCs privatized crown corporations ranging from Saskatchewan Minerals, worth $15 million, to the Potash Corporation, worth more than $1 billion. The government attempted to privatize SaskEnergy, the natural gas division of SaskPower, but a legislative walk-out by the Opposition—and a public petition with over 100,000 signatures—prevented it. While privatizing public companies, Devine's government proved eager to supply loans and subsidies to private businesses, helping result in the construction of two heavy oil upgraders, a fertilizer plant, and pulp and paper mills.

=== Agricultural policies ===
Devine opposed government ownership of land, and in 1982 his government abolished the Land Bank, which had been established by the NDP in 1974 and sought to aid the intergenerational transfer of farmland. The PCs replaced it with 8 percent loans to allow farmers to buy their own land. The main reason cited for the closure of the Land Bank was that it led to a large amount of land being acquired by the government.

The Devine government offered a universal, low-interest loan program to farmers that cost the province $1 billion. In 1989, Devine's government began to subsidize crop revenues by introducing the Net Income Stabilization Account and the Gross Revenue Insurance Program; this marked the start of the province directly supporting crop farm incomes. The programs were deemed critical given a prolonged drought and depressed grain prices that created serious financial trouble for the province's agricultural sector.

=== Energy policies ===
Devine's government introduced a three-year royalty holiday for new oil wells and cut royalties for existing ones. This led to a significant increase in drilling, though the government experienced lower revenues due to low royalties. In 1986, Devine's government privatized SaskOil by taking the majority of the company public; its name was changed to Wascana Energy Inc. and shares were made available on the public market. In 1987, the last remaining government interest in the corporation was sold to Canadian Occidental Petroleum. The province also sold the Saskatchewan Mining Development Corporation, which had been a key player in developing uranium mining the province. Devine's government also cut funding for research and development in alternative energy, including closing the provincial Office of Energy Conservation in 1982.

=== 1986 election ===
In the 1986 election, Devine's PCs were re-elected with a reduced majority, making Devine the only PC leader to win re-election in the province. However, the victory had not been a foregone conclusion. Devine banked significantly on pre-election spending, particularly on rural initiatives and farmers. Crucially, just before the election, Devine secured a $1 billion farming aid package from Ottawa. In addition, the government offered homeowners $1,500 home-improvement grants. While the PCs presented a pre-election budget with a $389 million deficit, the actual deficit proved to be well over $1 billion.

The NDP, with Blakeney still at the helm, narrowly won a plurality of the popular vote in 1986. However, Devine's emphasis on rural Saskatchewan paid off, and although the party was nearly swept out of Regina and Saskatoon, the rural vote helped the PCs secure 38 seats to 25 for the NDP.

=== 1991 election and aftermath ===
It was clear that Devine's government had become deeply unpopular leading up to the next provincial election, which Devine put off calling as long as legally possible. The dire financial situation led Devine to cancel several of its central commitments in 1990, including the home improvement program, its mortgage reduction program, and its gas tax rebate. His government was criticized late in its second term for undemocratic legislative tactics, including proroguing the Legislature and financing expenditures through the dubious use of special warrants. In its determination to privatize PotashCorp in 1989, the PCs enacted closure for the first time in Saskatchewan history to avoid debate and public scrutiny on the issue. Public opposition to service cuts led to organized resistance, including one of the largest public protests in Regina history with approximately seven thousand people descending on the Legislature in 1987. Also unpopular was a pre-election proposal to create a "Fair Share, Saskatchewan" program that promised to 'redistribute' more than 1,300 government and crown corporation jobs from Regina to smaller communities throughout the province—the scheme was seen as another bid to buy rural votes, and one that was in no way necessary. Privatizations, cuts to social programs, and the drastic increase in provincial debt also contributed to Devine's unpopularity, as did his close relationship with Mulroney's unpopular federal PCs.

After two terms in power, Devine's PCs suffered a landslide defeat in the 1991 election at the hands of the NDP, now led by former attorney general Roy Romanow. The PCs were reduced to 10 seats in the legislature, all of them rural. Devine initially stayed on as Opposition leader. On 8 October 1992, he announced his resignation as Progressive Conservative leader, effective 31 December 1992.

Bill Boyd succeeded Devine as party leader, and particularly after revelations of a major expense fraud scandal began to surface publicly in 1995 (see below), Boyd tried to brand the party as the "New PCs". However, the party was further reduced to 5 seats and third party status in the 1995 election. In 1997, when much of the party membership helped to establish and migrated to the Saskatchewan Party, the PC party executive voted to effectively place the party in dormancy for at least the following two election cycles.

=== Fraud scandal ===
After an RCMP investigation concluded in 1995, it was revealed that the PCs were responsible for a major expense fraud scheme that unfolded during the party's second term in office, between 1987 and 1991. Claiming fraudulent expenses through faulty invoices from shell companies, party members—including MLAs and cabinet members—defrauded the province of $837,000. Ultimately, nineteen staff members and MLAs were charged in the scheme, and fifteen were convicted, including ten cabinet members and a caucus chair. Several of those convicted went on to serve prison sentences. Devine was never charged in the scheme, and he testified that as premier, he was too busy to pay attention to finances and was never aware of it, stating that, "In my entire political career, I have never been involved in, approved, or condoned or even been aware of any illegal activity or wrongdoing." Although Devine ultimately said that he accepted responsibility given his role as party leader, he also lamented that he and others in the party had been made "guilty by innuendo" and admitted to feeling "betrayed".

== Legacy ==
The legacy of Devine's government was undoubtedly tarnished by the expense fraud scandal, which has been called "easily the biggest political scandal in Saskatchewan's history," and led to Devine's PCs being labeled "one of the most corrupt governments in Canadian history". The scandal was a major factor in the declining fortunes of the party and the consequent founding of the Saskatchewan Party, which in the twenty-first century has earned the label of the province's new natural governing party, earning praise from Devine himself. However, the politics of the Devine era have also had a defining impact on the province. In particular, observers have noted that the Devine era marked an entrenchment of neoliberal economic policy in the province and a deepening divide between rural and urban issues and voters.

Saskatchewan historian Bill Waiser has argued that while politics in the province were for decades defined by debates over socialism and free enterprise, Devine—who himself embraced that debate—shifted the defining political divide towards a cleavage between urban and rural interests. This was a result of Devine's intent focus on rural priorities, including agriculture—in a stark example, Devine essentially staked the 1986 election on rural and farm support. Political analyst Dale Eisler, meanwhile, has written that Saskatchewan politics can be grouped into distinct "Before Devine" and "After Devine" categories. Devine's embrace of neoliberal economics, including the sell-off of significant public assets, shifted the economic landscape of the province, which since the 1940s had relied largely on state-led investment and crown corporations for economic development. Moreover, the accumulation of debt under Devine left the province on the brink of bankruptcy; when Roy Romanow's NDP drastically cut spending to deal with the fiscal crisis, it signaled an entrenchment of neoliberalism. When many of the cuts of the Romanow era were seen as detrimental to rural Saskatchewan in particular, the urban-rural divide was deepened even further.

== Later career and honours ==
In January 2004, Devine announced his intention to return to politics and run for the federal Conservative Party in the riding of Souris—Moose Mountain, which encompassed his former provincial riding of Estevan. Although he had been encouraged to run by Conservative deputy leader Peter MacKay, the party ultimately ruled that Devine was an undesirable candidate—due in part to the Saskatchewan PC expense fraud scandal—and denied him the nomination. On 7 May, Devine announced that he would run as an independent candidate in the 2004 federal election in Souris—Moose Mountain. Consequently, Devine was expelled from the Conservative Party on 8 June by the party's executive council. Devine went on to finish second to Conservative Ed Komarnicki.

In 2009, Devine was appointed to the Saskatchewan Order of Merit, an honour that was first introduced when he was serving as premier in 1985. In 2017, a dam and reservoir near Alameda, Saskatchewan, originally called the Alameda Dam, was re-named after Devine; Devine had helped to create the project, which was opened in 1994.

In 2017, Devine was appointed by the provincial government to the University of Saskatchewan's board of governors.

== Electoral record ==
=== Federal elections ===
2004 Canadian federal election: Souris—Moose Mountain
Party	Candidate	Votes	%
Conservative	Ed Komarnicki	11,306	36.9
Independent	Grant Devine	8,399	27.4
Liberal	Lonny McKague	6,001	19.6
New Democratic	Robert Stephen Stringer	4,202	13.7
Green	Sigfredo Gonzalez	537	1.8
Christian Heritage	Robert Thomas Jacobson	191	0.6
Total valid votes		30,636	100.0
Source: Elections Canada

=== Provincial elections ===
Electoral history of PCs under Grant Devine
Year	Party	Votes			Seats		Position
Year	Party	Total	%	±%	Total	±	Position
1982	PC	289,311	54.1%	+16%	55 / 64	+40	Majority government
1986	PC	244,382	44.6%	–9.5%	38 / 64	–16	Majority government
1991	PC	137,994	25.5%	–19.1%	10 / 66	–28	Official Opposition

Constituency elections

1991 Saskatchewan general election: Estevan
Party	Candidate	Votes	%
Progressive Conservative	Grant Devine	4,079	43.5
New Democratic	Leonard Haukeness	3,404	36.3
Liberal	Bob Jones	1,889	20.2
Total valid votes		9,372	100.0
Source: Saskatchewan Archives - Election Results by Electoral Division

1986 Saskatchewan general election: Estevan
Party	Candidate	Votes	%
Progressive Conservative	Grant Devine	6,037	63.4
New Democratic	Dan Tangjerd	2,766	29.1
Liberal	Leonard Ludwig	655	6.9
Western Canada Concept	Randy Shaver	60	0.6
Total valid votes		9,518	100.0
Source: Saskatchewan Archives - Election Results by Electoral Division

1982 Saskatchewan general election: Estevan
Party	Candidate	Votes	%
Progressive Conservative	Grant Devine	5,487	59.2
New Democratic	John Chapman	2,947	31.8
Liberal	Heather MacDonald-Doyle	649	7.0
Western Canada Concept	Vernon McClement	184	2.0
Total valid votes		9,267	100.0
Source: Saskatchewan Archives - Election Results by Electoral Division

1980 by election: Estevan
Party	Candidate	Votes	%
New Democratic	John Chapman	2,918	36.8
Progressive Conservative	Grant Devine	2,858	36.0
Liberal	Ralph Goodale	2,156	27.2
Total valid votes		7,932	100.0
Source: Saskatchewan Archives - Election Results by Electoral Division

1978 Saskatchewan general election: Saskatoon Nutana
Party	Candidate	Votes	%
New Democratic	Wesley Albert Robbins	4,739	57.2
Progressive Conservative	Grant Devine	2,466	29.8
Liberal	John A. Shanks	1,080	13.0
Total valid votes		8,285	100.0
Source: Saskatchewan Archives - Election Results by Electoral Division
