= The Battlefords (provincial electoral district) =

Provincial electoral district in Saskatchewan, Canada

Coordinates: 52°45′N 108°18′W

Saskatchewan electoral district

Provincial electoral district
- Legislature: Legislative Assembly of Saskatchewan
MLA
Jeremy Cockrill
Saskatchewan
- District created: 1917 (original), 2002 (current)
- First contested: 2003
- Last contested: 2024

Demographics
- Electors: 9,528
- Communities: North Battleford, Battleford

The Battlefords is a provincial electoral district for the Legislative Assembly of Saskatchewan, Canada. It includes the city of North Battleford and the adjoining town of Battleford. Collectively these communities are commonly known as "The Battlefords".

The district was first established in 1917 from the urban portions of the constituencies of Battleford and North Battleford. The district was contested in every election until the 1995 general election, when it was broken up into the re-created district of North Battleford and a new district, Battleford-Cut Knife. North Battleford and Battleford-Cut Knife were abolished before the 2003 general election and The Battlefords was re-established as an electoral district.

It was most recently contested in the 2020 election, when Saskatchewan Party candidate Jeremy Cockrill was elected.

== Members of the Legislative Assembly ==
Legislature	Years	Member	Party
11th	1948–1949	Paul Prince	Liberal
11th	1949–1952	Hugh James Maher	Liberal
12th	1953–1956	Eiling Kramer	CCF
13th	1957–1960	Eiling Kramer	CCF
14th	1961–1964	Eiling Kramer	CCF
15th	1965–1967	Eiling Kramer	CCF
16th	1968–1971	Eiling Kramer	CCF
17th	1971–1975	Eiling Kramer	NDP
18th	1975–1978	Eiling Kramer	NDP
19th	1978–1980	Eiling Kramer	NDP
19th	1980–1982	David Manly Miner	NDP
20th	1982–1986	Myles Morin	Progressive Conservative
21st	1986–1991	Douglas Anguish	New Democrat
22nd	1991–1995	Douglas Anguish	New Democrat
District divided into Battleford-Cut Knife and North Battleford
25th	2003–2007	Len Taylor	New Democrat
26th	2007–2011	Len Taylor	New Democrat
27th	2011–2016	Herb Cox	Saskatchewan Party
28th	2016–2020	Herb Cox	Saskatchewan Party
29th	2020–2024	Jeremy Cockrill	Saskatchewan Party
30th	2024-present	Jeremy Cockrill	Saskatchewan Party

== Electoral results ==
2024 Saskatchewan general election
Party	Candidate	Votes	%	±%
Saskatchewan	Jeremy Cockrill	4,352	59.40	-6.79
New Democratic	Tom Kroczynski	2,719	37.11	+8.56
Green	Sara Piotrofsky	140	1.91	+0.06
Buffalo	Dale Richardson	115	1.57	*
Total valid votes		7,326		
Total rejected ballots				
Turnout				
Eligible voters		–		
Source: Elections Saskatchewan

2020 Saskatchewan general election
Party	Candidate	Votes	%	±%
Saskatchewan	Jeremy Cockrill	4,477	66.19	+5.48
New Democratic	Amber Stewart	1,931	28.55	-3.39
Progressive Conservative	Harry Zamonsky	231	3.42	*
Green	Joey Reynolds	125	1.85	+0.68
Total valid votes		6,764	98.99	
Total rejected ballots		69	1.01	+0.81
Turnout		6,833	48.04	-5.07
Eligible voters		14,223		
Saskatchewan hold		Swing		+4.44
Source: Elections Saskatchewan

2016 Saskatchewan general election
Party	Candidate	Votes	%
Saskatchewan	Herb Cox	4,296	60.70
New Democratic	Rob Feist	2,260	31.93
Liberal	Dexter Gopher	438	6.19
Green	Josh Hunt	83	1.17
Total valid votes		7,077	99.80
Total rejected ballots		14	0.20
Turnout		7,091	53.11
Eligible voters		13,352	
Source: Elections Saskatchewan, Global News

2011 Saskatchewan election
Party	Candidate	Votes	%	±%
Saskatchewan	Herb Cox	3,527	51.06%	+11.40%
NDP	Len Taylor	2,475	35.83%	-7.99%
Liberal	Ryan Bater	812	11.76%	-1.60%
Green	Owen Swiderski	93	1.35%	-1.04%
Total		6,907	100.00%	
Saskatchewan gain from New Democratic		Swing		-

2007 Saskatchewan general election
Party	Candidate	Votes	%	±%
New Democratic	Len Taylor	3,332	43.81%	+1.29
Saskatchewan	Herb Cox	3,020	39.71%	+13.83
Liberal	Ryan Bater	1,016	13.36%	−16.34
Green	Reid Steward	180	2.39%	*
Western Independence	Gordon Elias	57	0.76%	−1.18
Total		7,605	100.00%	

2003 Saskatchewan election, The Battlefords (provincial electoral district)
Party	Candidate	Votes	%	±%
NDP	Len Taylor	3,056	42.53%	*
Liberal	Jack Hillson	2,134	29.70%	*
Saskatchewan	Larry Doke	1,856	25.83%	*
Western Independence	Gordon Elias	139	1.94%	*
Total		7,185	100.00%	

== See also ==
- List of Saskatchewan provincial electoral districts
- List of Saskatchewan general elections
- Canadian provincial electoral districts
