= Andy Renaud =

Canadian politician

MLA for Carrot River Valley
- In office 1995–1999
- Preceded by: Constituency Created
- Succeeded by: Carl Kwiatkowski

MLA for Kelsey-Tisdale
- In office 1991–1995
- Preceded by: Neal Hardy
- Succeeded by: Constituency Abolished

Personal details
- Born: December 27, 1946 (age 79) Prince Albert, Saskatchewan
- Party: Saskatchewan New Democratic Party

Andrew L. J. Renaud (born December 27, 1946) was a Canadian politician. He was elected to the Legislative Assembly of Saskatchewan as an NDP member for the constituency of Kelsey-Tisdale in 1991. He was re-elected to a second term in the constituency of Carrot River Valley in 1995, serving until his defeat in 1999.
