= Carrot River Valley =

Provincial electoral district in Saskatchewan, Canada

Coordinates: 53°20′N 103°00′W

Saskatchewan electoral district

Provincial electoral district
- Legislature: Legislative Assembly of Saskatchewan
MLA
Terri Bromm
Saskatchewan
- District created: 1994
- First contested: 1995
- Last contested: 2024

Demographics
- Electors: 10,340
- Census subdivision(s): Nipawin, Tisdale, Hudson Bay, Carrot River

Carrot River Valley is a provincial electoral district for the Legislative Assembly of Saskatchewan, Canada. Located in the east central area of Saskatchewan, this constituency was created by The Representation Act, 1994 (Saskatchewan) out of the former district of Kelsey-Tisdale and part of the riding of Nipawin. The Carrot River flows through the riding.

The riding was last contested in the 2020 general election, when incumbent Saskatchewan Party MLA Fred Bradshaw was re-elected.

The largest population centers in the constituency are Nipawin (pop. 4,275), Tisdale (pop. 3,063), Hudson Bay (pop. 1,783), and Carrot River (pop. 1,017). Smaller communities in the riding include the villages of Codette, Zenon Park, Aylsham, Mistatim, and Crooked River; and the town of Arborfield.

== History ==
The riding was first contested in the 1995 general election, when it returned NDP candidate Andy Renaud. After the 1999 general election, the riding returned only Saskatchewan Party members until the present day.

== Members of the Legislative Assembly ==
This riding has elected the following members of the Legislative Assembly:

Legislature	Years	Member	Party
Carrot River Valley; Riding created from Kelsey-Tisdale and Nipawin
23rd	1995–1999	Andy Renaud	New Democratic
24th	1999–2003	Carl Kwiatkowski	Saskatchewan
24th	2003–2003	Allan Kerpan	Saskatchewan
25th	2003–2007	Allan Kerpan	Saskatchewan
26th	2007–2011	Fred Bradshaw	Saskatchewan
27th	2011–2016	Fred Bradshaw	Saskatchewan
28th	2016–2020	Fred Bradshaw	Saskatchewan
29th	2020–2024	Fred Bradshaw	Saskatchewan
30th	2024–present	Terri Bromm	Saskatchewan

== Election results ==
=== 2024 ===
2024 Saskatchewan general election
Party	Candidate	Votes	%	±%
Saskatchewan	Terri Bromm	4,857	67.12	-6.78
New Democratic	CJ Binkley	1,395	19.28	+0.38
Saskatchewan United	Shauna Stanley Seymour	844	11.66	–
Green	Liam Becker Lau	140	1.93	+0.43
Total valid votes		7,236	99.16	
Total rejected ballots		61	0.84	
Turnout		7,297	54.23	
Eligible voters		13,456		
Saskatchewan hold		Swing		
Source: Elections Saskatchewan

=== 2020 ===
2020 provincial election redistributed results
Party	%
Saskatchewan	73.9
New Democratic	18.9
Green	1.5
Buffalo	0.5

2020 Saskatchewan general election: Carrot River Valley
Party	Candidate	Votes	%	±%
Saskatchewan	Fred Bradshaw	4,833	74.54	-1.42
New Democratic	Rod McCorriston	1,282	19.77	-0.60
Progressive Conservative	Glen Leson	279	4.30	–
Green	Liam Becker	90	1.39	-0.32
Total valid votes		6,484	99.37	
Total rejected ballots		41	0.63	–
Turnout		6,525	–	–
Eligible voters		–		
Saskatchewan hold		Swing		–
Source: Elections Saskatchewan

=== 2016 ===
2016 Saskatchewan general election: Carrot River Valley
Party	Candidate	Votes	%	±%
Saskatchewan	Fred Bradshaw	5,104	75.96	+0.67
New Democratic	Sandy Ewen	1,369	20.37	-1.82
Liberal	Karalsingham Sadadcharan	131	1.94	-
Green	Koreena Lynn Fibke	115	1.71	-0.81
Total valid votes		–	100.0	
Eligible voters		–		
Saskatchewan hold		Swing		–
Source: Elections Saskatchewan

=== 2011 ===
2011 Saskatchewan general election: Carrot River Valley
Party	Candidate	Votes	%	±%
Saskatchewan	Fred Bradshaw	4,903	75.29	+13.55
New Democratic	Arnold Schellenberg	1,445	22.19	–11.00
Green	Spencer Bourassa	164	2.52	–
Total valid votes		6,512	100.0	
Saskatchewan hold		Swing		+12.28

=== 2007 ===
2007 Saskatchewan general election: Carrot River Valley
Party	Candidate	Votes	%	±%
Saskatchewan	Fred Bradshaw	4,364	61.74	+14.97
New Democratic	Leigh Spencer	2,346	33.19	–8.80
Liberal	Gerry MacNeill	358	5.07	–6.17
Total valid votes		7,068	100.0	
Saskatchewan hold		Swing		+11.88

=== 2003 ===
2003 Saskatchewan general election: Carrot River Valley
Party	Candidate	Votes	%	±%
Saskatchewan	Allan Kerpan	3,447	46.77	–1.50
New Democratic	Mark Pitzel	3,095	41.99	+10.78
Liberal	Kathy McIntyre	828	11.24	–9.28
Total valid votes		7,370	100.0	
Saskatchewan hold		Swing		–6.14

=== 2003 by-election ===
Saskatchewan provincial by-election, 26 June 2003: Carrot River Valley On the death of Carl Kwiatkowski, 2 February 2003
Party	Candidate	Votes	%	±%
Saskatchewan	Allan Kerpan	2,192	48.27	–2.52
New Democratic	Mark Pitzel	1,417	31.21	–8.54
Liberal	Kathy McIntyre	932	20.52	+11.06
Total valid votes		4,541	100.0	
Saskatchewan hold		Swing		+3.01

=== 1999 ===
1999 Saskatchewan general election: Carrot River Valley
Party	Candidate	Votes	%	±%
Saskatchewan	Carl Kwiatkowski	3,582	50.79	–
New Democratic	Andy Renaud	2,803	39.75	–3.49
Liberal	Ron Wassill	667	9.46	–26.49
Total valid votes		7,052	100.0	
Saskatchewan gain from New Democratic		Swing		+27.14

=== 1995 ===
1995 Saskatchewan general election: Carrot River Valley
Party	Candidate	Votes	%
New Democratic	Andy Renaud	3,238	43.24
Liberal	Gary Broker	2,692	35.95
Progressive Conservative	Bob Ferguson	1,558	20.81
Total valid votes		7,488	100.0
New Democratic pickup new district.			

== See also ==
- List of Saskatchewan provincial electoral districts
- List of Saskatchewan general elections
- Canadian provincial electoral districts
- Kelsey (Saskatchewan provincial electoral district) (1952–1971)
- Kelsey-Tisdale (1971–1995)
