= Leo Nile Nicholson =

Canadian politician

Member of the Legislative Assembly of Saskatchewan
- In office 1956–1960
- Preceded by: Thomas Russell MacNutt
- Succeeded by: Robert Irvin Perkins
- Constituency: Nipawin

Personal details
- Born: September 30, 1908 Fairview, Oklahoma, U.S.
- Died: December 1977 (aged 69)
- Party: Social Credit Party of Saskatchewan
- Spouse: Viola Johnston (m. 1933)
- Occupation: Realtor and farmer

Leo Nile Nicholson (September 30, 1908 – December 1977) was a Canadian politician. He served in the Legislative Assembly of Saskatchewan from 1956 to 1960 as member of the Social Credit party. He was a realtor and farmer, having previously served on the Nipawin Town Council.
