= Nipawin (provincial electoral district) =

Former provincial electoral district in Saskatchewan, Canada

Coordinates: 53°35′N 104°20′W

Nipawin was a provincial electoral district for the Legislative Assembly of the province of Saskatchewan, Canada. This district was created before the 9th Saskatchewan general election in 1938 as "Torch River", after the rural municipality and the river that flows through it. Redrawn and renamed "Nipawin" in 1952, the constituency was dissolved before the 23rd Saskatchewan general election in 1995.

It is now part of the constituencies of Carrot River Valley and Saskatchewan Rivers.

== Members of the Legislative Assembly ==
=== Torch River (1938–1952) ===
#	MLA	Served	Party
1.	James Kiteley	1938 – 1944	Liberal
2.	John Harris	1944 – 1948	CCF
3.	John Denike	1948 – 1952	CCF

=== Nipawin (1952–1995) ===
#	MLA	Served	Party
1.	Thomas R. MacNutt	1952 – 1956	Liberal
2.	Leo Nicholson	1956 – 1960	Social Credit
3.	Robert Perkins	1960 – 1964	CCF
4.	Frank Radloff	1964 – 1971	Liberal
5.	John Comer	1971 – 1975	New Democrat
6.	Richard Collver	1975 – 1980	Progressive Conservative
7.	Richard Collver	1980 – 1982	Unionest Party
8.	Lloyd Sauder	1982 – 1991	Progressive Conservative
9.	Tom Keeping	1991 – 1995	New Democrat

== Election results ==
=== Torch River (1938–1952) ===
1938 Saskatchewan general election: Torch River electoral district
Party	Candidate	Votes	%	±%
Liberal	James Kiteley	1,992	42.05%	–
CCF	Harry Fenster	1,354	28.58%	–
Social Credit	Herve Prince	1,025	21.64%	–
Conservative	Conrad B. Euler	366	7.73%	–
Total		4,737	100.00%	

1944 Saskatchewan general election: Torch River electoral district
Party	Candidate	Votes	%	±%
CCF	John Harris	2,609	65.39%	+36.81
Liberal	Donald L. Menzies	846	21.20%	-20.85
Prog. Conservative	Keith A. Baldwin	535	13.41%	+5.68
Total		3,990	100.00%	

1948 Saskatchewan general election: Torch River electoral district
Party	Candidate	Votes	%	±%
CCF	John Denike	2,260	41.19%	-24.20
Liberal	Harold Guloien	1,779	32.42%	+11.22
Social Credit	Leo Nicholson	1,448	26.39%	-
Total		5,487	100.00%	

=== Nipawin (1952–1995) ===
1952 Saskatchewan general election: Nipawin electoral district
Party	Candidate	Votes	%	±%
Liberal	Thomas R. MacNutt	3,856	50.22%	+17.80
CCF	J.B. McDermott	3,451	44.94%	+3.75
Prog. Conservative	R.F. Platte	372	4.84%	-
Total		7,679	100.00%	

1956 Saskatchewan general election: Nipawin electoral district
Party	Candidate	Votes	%	±%
Social Credit	Leo Nicholson	3,125	45.88%	-
CCF	John J. Morrow	2,325	34.13%	-10.81
Liberal	Thomas R. MacNutt	1,362	19.99%	-30.23
Total		6,812	100.00%	

1960 Saskatchewan general election: Nipawin electoral district
Party	Candidate	Votes	%	±%
CCF	Bob Perkins	2,197	33.65%	-0.48
Social Credit	Leo Nicholson	2,070	31.70%	-14.18
Liberal	Frank Radloff	1,817	27.83%	+7.84
Prog. Conservative	E. Archie Mardell	445	6.82%	-
Total		6,529	100.00%	

1964 Saskatchewan general election: Nipawin electoral district
Party	Candidate	Votes	%	±%
Liberal	Frank Radloff	2,652	37.70%	+9.87
CCF	Bob Perkins	2,440	34.69%	+1.04
Prog. Conservative	John A. Whittome	1,942	27.61%	+20.79
Total		7,034	100.00%	

1967 Saskatchewan general election: Nipawin electoral district
Party	Candidate	Votes	%	±%
Liberal	Frank Radloff	2,454	40.33%	+2.63
NDP	Walter A. Mills	2,446	40.20%	+5.51
Prog. Conservative	John A. Whittome	1,185	19.47%	-8.14
Total		6,085	100.00%	

1971 Saskatchewan general election: Nipawin electoral district
Party	Candidate	Votes	%	±%
NDP	John Comer	3,759	46.98%	+6.78
Liberal	Frank Radloff	3,489	43.61%	+3.28
Progressive Conservative	Bette Harris	753	9.41%	-10.06
Total		8,001	100.00%	

1975 Saskatchewan general election: Nipawin electoral district
Party	Candidate	Votes	%	±%
Progressive Conservative	Richard L. Collver	3,381	45.52%	+36.11
NDP	John Comer	2,599	35.00%	-11.98
Liberal	Ellis H. Hill	1,447	19.48%	-24.13
Total		7,427	100.00%	

1978 Saskatchewan general election: Nipawin electoral district
Party	Candidate	Votes	%	±%
Progressive Conservative	Richard L. Collver	3,733	49.36%	+3.84
NDP	Irvin G. Perkins	3,262	43.13%	+8.13
Liberal	Ron J. Wassill	568	7.51%	-11.97
Total		7,563	100.00%	

1982 Saskatchewan general election: Nipawin electoral district
Party	Candidate	Votes	%	±%
Progressive Conservative	Lloyd Sauder	4,267	53.55%	+4.19
NDP	Irvin G. Perkins	2,844	35.68%	-7.45
Western Canada Concept	Bob Fair	627	7.87%	–
Liberal	Ron J. Wassill	231	2.90%	-4.61
Total		7,969	100.00%	

1986 Saskatchewan general election: Nipawin electoral district
Party	Candidate	Votes	%	±%
Progressive Conservative	Lloyd Sauder	4,312	55.98%	+2.43
NDP	Gilda Treleaven	2,975	38.62%	+2.94
Liberal	Ron J. Wassill	416	5.40%	+2.50
Total		7,703	100.00%	

1991 Saskatchewan general election: Nipawin electoral district
Party	Candidate	Votes	%	±%
NDP	Tom Keeping	3,238	45.25%	+6.63
Prog. Conservative	Jim Taylor	2,784	38.90%	-17.08
Liberal	Richard Makowsky	1,134	15.85%	+10.45
Total		7,156	100.00%	

== See also ==
- List of Saskatchewan provincial electoral districts
- List of Saskatchewan general elections
- Canadian provincial electoral districts
- Nipawin, Saskatchewan
