= David Miner =

David Miner may refer to:

- David M. Miner (born 1962), American politician, member of the North Carolina General Assembly, 1993–2004
- David Miner (musician) (born 1945), American guitarist, singer and songwriter
- David Miner (television producer) (born 1969), American film and television producer
- David Manly Miner (born 1937), politician in Saskatchewan, Canada

== See also ==
- Dave Minor (1922–1998), American basketball player
