= Jeremy Cockrill =

Canadian politician

The Honourable Jeremy Cockrill ECS MLA

Member of the Saskatchewan Legislative Assembly for The Battlefords
- Incumbent
- Assumed office October 26, 2020
- Preceded by: Herb Cox

Personal details
- Born: Chilliwack, British Columbia
- Party: Saskatchewan Party
- Education: Trinity Western University
- Profession: Management

Jeremy Cockrill is a Canadian politician. He is a member of the Legislative Assembly of Saskatchewan (MLA), representing the electoral district of The Battlefords as a member of the Saskatchewan Party. He has served in the cabinet of Premier Scott Moe since 2022, and is currently the Minister of Health.

== Early life and career ==
Cockrill was raised in Chilliwack, British Columbia and graduated from Trinity Western University (TWU) with a Bachelor of Business Administration in 2012. He served on the board of director of the alumni association of TWU. Cockrill played high school and college basketball, including with the TWU Spartans, and later coached youth basketball.

From 2010 to 2012, he served as the president of Vital Lines Ltd., a line-painting company in Abbotsford, BC. While in BC, Cockrill also worked in the agriculture and agri-food industries. Before he was elected in 2020, he managed his family's business, Fortress Windows and Doors, in North Battleford, Saskatchewan.

== Political career ==
Cockrill won the Saskatchewan Party nomination for The Battlefords ahead of the 2020 provincial election after two-term incumbent Herb Cox announced his retirement. In the fall election, Cockrill held the seat for the Saskatchewan Party, receiving 66% of votes.

On May 31, 2022 Cockrill joined Scott Moe's Cabinet when he was named Minister of Highways and the minister responsible for the Water Security Agency.

=== Minister of Education ===
In a cabinet shuffle on August 29, 2023, Cockrill became Minister of Education, taking over from veteran MLA Dustin Duncan. Cockrill took over the education portfolio as the Saskatchewan Party government was working towards passing new legislation called the "Parents' Bill of Rights". The legislation places restrictions on sexual health education in schools—including banning third-party participation, such as experts on sexual assault—and requires parental consent for students under the age of 16 wishing to have their chosen names and pronouns affirmed at school. After an injunction was granted against the proposed policy by a Court of King's Bench justice on September 28, stating a concern that the policy came with the risk of causing "irreparable harm" to vulnerable students, the government recalled the Legislature two weeks early to invoke the notwithstanding clause to have the legislation put in effect. In October, Cockrill was criticized for incorrectly claiming that "every single government MLA" had heard from constituents that they had children who had been using different pronouns without their knowledge; fellow MLA Everett Hindley immediately refuted this in response to a question, and in an October 3 interview, Premier Moe stated that he had not been made aware of any such discussions with parents. Cockrill also claimed, without providing evidence, that the government had heard from "tens of thousands" of people in support of the policy. A sworn affidavit in court showed that the Ministry of Education had received 18 letters expressing concern about pronouns in school between June and the introduction of the policy in August. However, a national Christian lobbying group called Action4Canada claims to have sent more than 10,000 messages to Moe and Duncan and to have met with Duncan's staff earlier in 2023 to push for the policy. The bill passed into law on October 20, 2023.

The Parents' Bill of Rights, which amended the province's Education Act, also contained a provision making it a legal requirement for schools to fly the Saskatchewan provincial flag. Cockrill stated that the government hoped that this would help to ensure that children "not only are they proud of the country they live in, but also the province they live in".

Cockrill's time as education minister saw negotiations with the Saskatchewan Teachers' Federation (STF) on a new collective bargaining agreement. The STF, which initiated job action beginning in January 2024, accused Cockrill of lying about the federation withdrawing from negotiations, and criticized the government for stonewalling negotiations. Cockrill faced calls to resign after suggesting to a Saskatchewan mother whose child had died that the STF was asking for his "firstborn child"; Cockrill apologized in the Legislature for the comment. After teachers rejected two separate government contract offers in May 2024, the two sides agreed to send the dispute to binding arbitration, slated to take place before the end of 2024.

=== Minister of Health ===
Cockrill was re-elected in the 2024 general election was subsequently named the Minister of Health in the new cabinet.

=== Conflict of Interest investigations ===
In 2024, Cockrill became the subject of two separate conflict of interest investigations by the province's Conflict of Interest Commissioner. The first investigation, publicly announced in August, centred on Cockrill's continued connections to Fortress Windows and Doors, which had received public contracts worth hundreds of thousands of dollars after Cockrill was elected. In December 2024, the Commissioner found that Cockrill had breached the Act by not stepping away from his business, noted that it was unintentional, and recommended a reprimand.

The second investigation, announced in September, targeted Cockrill's personal investments in two helium companies partnering with and receiving tax breaks from the provincial government.

== Electoral results ==
2024 Saskatchewan general election: The Battlefords
Party	Candidate	Votes	%
Saskatchewan	Jeremy Cockrill	4,352	59.41
New Democratic	Tom Krocynski	2,719	37.11
Green	Sara Piotrofsky	140	1.91
Buffalo	Dale Richardson	115	1.57
Total		7,326	100.0
Source: Elections Saskatchewan

2020 Saskatchewan general election: The Battlefords
Party	Candidate	Votes	%
Saskatchewan	Jeremy Cockrill	4,477	66.19
New Democratic	Amber Stewart	1,931	28.55
Progressive Conservative	Harry Zamonsky	231	3.41
Green	Joey Reynolds	125	1.85
Total		6,764	100.0
Source: Elections Saskatchewan

== Cabinet positions ==
Saskatchewan provincial government of Scott Moe
Cabinet posts (3)
Predecessor	Office	Successor
Everett Hindley	Minister of Health; November 7, 2024 –	Incumbent
Dustin Duncan	Minister of Education; August 29, 2023 – November 7, 2024	Everett Hindley
Fred Bradshaw	Minister of Highways; May 31, 2022 – August 29, 2023	Lori Carr
