= Doreen Eagles =

Canadian provincial politician

Member of the Saskatchewan Legislative Assembly for Estevan
- In office September 16, 1999 – March 8, 2016
- Preceded by: Larry Ward
- Succeeded by: Lori Carr

Personal details
- Party: Saskatchewan Party

Doreen Eagles is a Canadian provincial politician. She was the Saskatchewan Party member of the Legislative Assembly of Saskatchewan for the constituency of Estevan from 1999 until 2016.

Doreen was born in Midale, Saskatchewan and grew up in Macoun-Estevan area on her families farm. Doreen received her education in Macoun. Doreen and her husband Vic Eagles have two children: Terry and Trisha, both who have children of their own.
