= Lori Carr =

Canadian politician

The Honourable Lori Carr ECS MLA

Member of the Saskatchewan Legislative Assembly for Estevan-Big Muddy Estevan (2016-2024)
- Incumbent
- Assumed office April 4, 2016
- Preceded by: Doreen Eagles

Personal details
- Party: Saskatchewan Party

Lori Carr is a Canadian politician, who was first elected to the Legislative Assembly of Saskatchewan in the 2016 provincial election. She represents the electoral district of Estevan-Big Muddy as a member of the Saskatchewan Party. She has served as a cabinet minister in the government of Premier Scott Moe.

== Political career ==
Carr was first elected to represent the electoral district of Estevan in the 2016 provincial election, succeeding long-time MLA Doreen Eagles. Carr was re-elected in 2020 and again in 2024, in the expanded district of Estevan-Big Muddy.

Carr was first appointed to Cabinet by Premier Scott Moe in August 2018 when she became Minister of Highways and Infrastructure. One year later, Carr was shuffled to become Minister of Government Relations, as well as the Minister Responsible for First Nations, Métis and Northern Affairs, despite her southern district not containing any First Nations. In November 2020, following that year's general election, Carr began her longest stint in charge of any portfolio when she was named Minister of Social Services.

In 2019, that ministry had introduced reforms to the welfare system, consolidating some programs in the Saskatchewan Income Support (SIS) program. By 2021, social workers, housing advocates, landlords, and the Federation of Sovereign Indigenous Nations all argued that those reforms were fueling a housing and homelessness crisis in the province. This resulted in the establishment of Camp Marjorie, a homeless encampment, in Regina. Carr stood by the program, stating that it was designed to see "clients become more independent", committing only to "watch as we move forward and see what's happening". In 2022, Carr stated during a debate in the Legislature that anyone having difficulty finding shelter should contact her office; this led to a poster campaign urging homeless people to call Carr directly.

Carr was tasked by the province's Advocate for Children and Youth with reforming conditions in group homes after repeated reports of neglect, abuse, and unsafe conditions. The Advocate's initial report was submitted to the government in March 2021; a November 2021 report urged the Ministry to accelerate reforms.

In May 2022, Carr was shuffled from Social Services to SaskBuilds and Procurement. In August 2023, in another shuffle, Carr was named Minister of Highways, returning to her first cabinet portfolio. Following the 2024 general election, Carr replaced Tim McLeod as the Minister of Mental Health and Addictions, Seniors, and Rural and Remote Health; Carr was also named Deputy House Leader.

== Controversies ==
In May 2024, Carr was named by Speaker of the Legislative Assembly Randy Weekes as being part of a campaign of bullying and intimidation aimed at influencing the Speaker's rulings in favour of the government. Weekes alleged that Carr, who was serving as Deputy House Leader, frequently sent him harassing text messages about proceedings and rulings in the Legislature, along with then-House Leader Jeremy Harrison and deputy premier Donna Harpauer.

== Electoral history ==
2024 Saskatchewan general election: Estevan-Big Muddy
Party	Candidate	Votes	%
Saskatchewan	Lori Carr	5,277	69.97
New Democratic	Phil Smith	973	12.90
Buffalo	Phillip Zajac	755	10.01
Saskatchewan United	Andrew Cey	453	6.01
Green	Billy Patterson	84	1.11
Total		7,542	99.99
Source: Elections Saskatchewan

2020 Saskatchewan general election: Estevan
Party	Candidate	Votes	%
Saskatchewan	Lori Carr	4,409	62.43
Buffalo	Phillip Zajac	1,713	24.26
New Democratic	Seth Lendrum	470	6.66
Progressive Conservative	Linda Sopp	354	5.01
Green	Scott Meyers	116	1.64
Total		7,062	100.0
Source: Elections Saskatchewan

2016 Saskatchewan general election: Estevan
Party	Candidate	Votes	%
Saskatchewan	Lori Carr	5,454	77.85
New Democratic	Tina Vuckovic	635	9.06
Progressive Conservative	Paul Carroll	618	8.82
Liberal	Oskar Karkabatov	118	1.68
Independent	Cam Robock	91	1.29
Green	Branden Schick	89	1.27
Total		7,005	100.0
Source: Saskatchewan Archives - Election Results by Electoral Division; Elections Saskatchewan

== Cabinet positions ==
Saskatchewan provincial government of Scott Moe
Cabinet posts (7)
Predecessor	Office	Successor
Tim McLeod	Minister of Mental Health and Addictions, Seniors and Rural and Remote Health; November 7, 2024 –	Incumbent
Jeremy Cockrill	Minister of Highways; August 29, 2023 – November 7, 2024	Dave Marit
Jim Reiter	Minister of SaskBuilds and Procurement; May 31, 2022 – August 29, 2023	Joe Hargrave
Paul Merriman	Minister of Social Services; November 9, 2020 – May 31, 2022	Gene Makowsky
Warren Kaeding	Minister of First Nations, Métis, and Northern Affairs; August 13, 2019 – November 9, 2020	Don McMorris
Warren Kaeding	Minister of Government Relations; August 13, 2019 – November 9, 2020	Don McMorris
Dave Marit	Minister of Highways and Infrastructure; August 15, 2018 – August 13, 2019	Greg Ottenbreit
