= Neal Herbert Hardy =

Canadian politician

Neal Herbert Hardy SOM (born 1934) is a Canadian businessman and former political figure in Saskatchewan. He represented Kelsey-Tisdale from 1980 to 1991 in the Legislative Assembly of Saskatchewan as a Progressive Conservative.

He was born in Hudson Bay, Saskatchewan and worked for the Canadian National Railway, as well as owning and operating several businesses. Hardy was elected to the provincial assembly in a 1980 by-election held after John Rissler Messer resigned his seat. He served in the provincial cabinet as Minister of the Environment and as Minister of Rural Development. Hardy was defeated by Andrew Renaud when he ran for reelection in 1991. He served on the council for the rural municipality of Hudson Bay and was president of the Saskatchewan Association of Rural Municipalities from 2002 to 2005. In 2009, he was named chairperson of the Saskatchewan Assessment Management Agency board of directors.

He was appointed a Member of the Saskatchewan Order of Merit in 2023.
