= Dustin Duncan =

Canadian provincial politician

The Honourable Dustin Duncan ECS
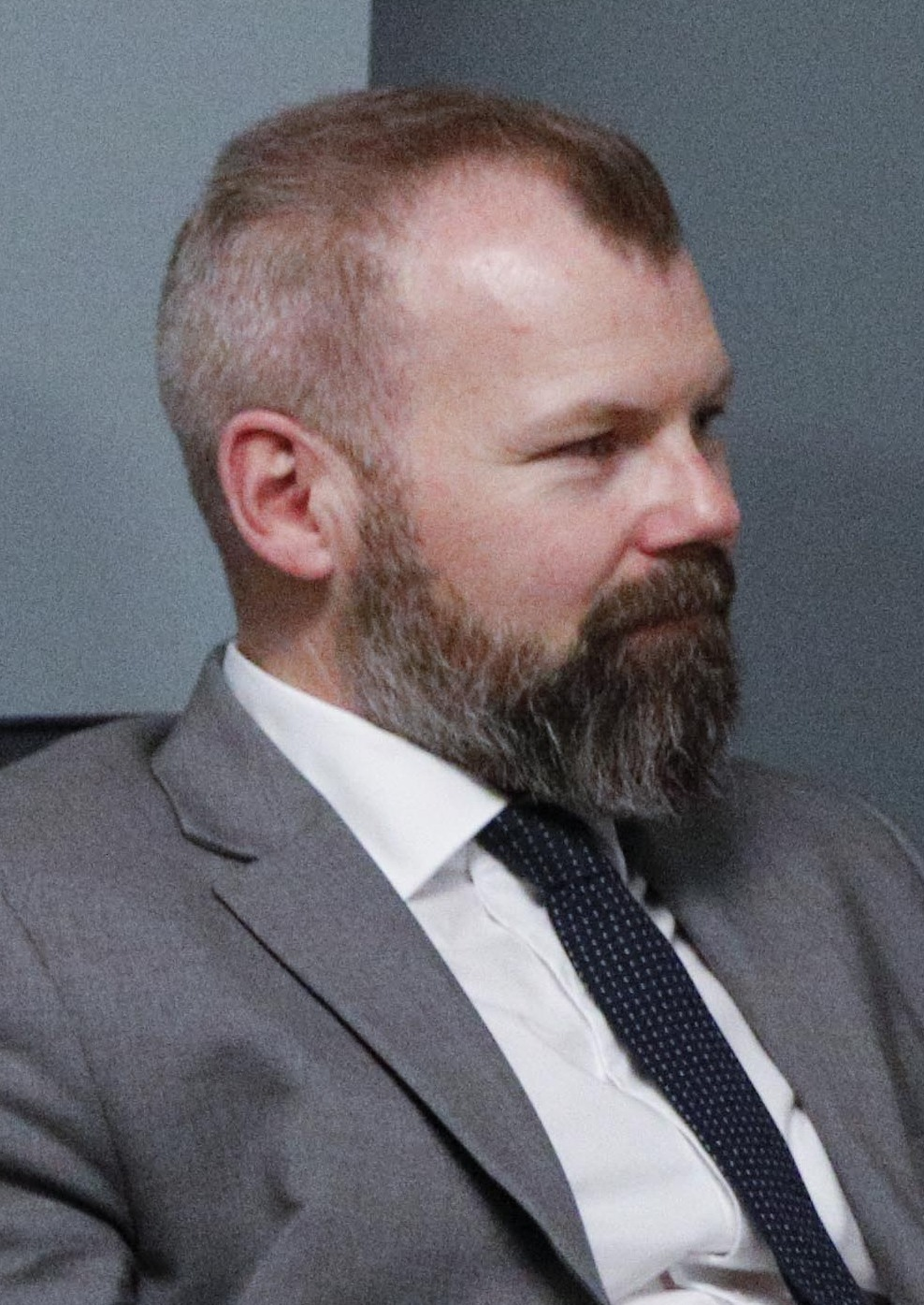
- Duncan in 2020

Member of the Saskatchewan Legislative Assembly for Weyburn-Big Muddy
- In office June 19, 2006 – October 1, 2024
- Preceded by: Brenda Bakken-Lackey
- Succeeded by: Michael Weger

Personal details
- Born: 1979 (age 46–47) Weyburn, Saskatchewan
- Party: Saskatchewan Party

Dustin Duncan is a Canadian politician. He was the Saskatchewan Party member of the Legislative Assembly of Saskatchewan for the constituency of Weyburn-Big Muddy from 2006 until 2024, and served as a cabinet minister in the governments of Brad Wall and Scott Moe. Duncan was first elected in a 2006 by-election when he was 26 years old.

== Political career ==
Duncan was first elected as a Member of the Legislative Assembly (MLA) for Weyburn-Big Muddy in a 2006 by—election, defeating Liberal David Karwacki with 49% of the vote. Duncan was re-elected four times, for the last time in 2020, when he received 77% of the vote. He decided not to run for re-election in the 2024 election. In a farewell speech to the Assembly, Duncan stated that he had achieved his main objectives in office and wanted to spend more time with his family.

=== Minister under Brad Wall ===
After he was first elected in 2006, then-Opposition Leader Brad Wall named Duncan the critic for both Youth Opportunities and Immigration. Duncan went on to hold a number of cabinet portfolios under Wall's premiership, beginning as the Minister of Tourism in 2009 and also holding positions as the Minister of Environment, Health, and Energy & Resources. Duncan also served as the Minister responsible for SaskTel and SaskEnergy. As Minister of Health, a portfolio he held for four years, Duncan passed legislation introducing private MRI clinics and CT scans to the province. Duncan also appointed an advisory panel to review reducing the number of regional health authorities in the province; this resulted in a 2017 recommendation to consolidate the province's 12 regional authorities into a single provincial authority. While he was health minister, he announced that the Sask Party government would not be meeting its 2012 pledge to eliminate surgical wait times by 2017.

While Duncan was responsible for SaskTel, the government mused openly about privatizing the crown corporation, to the point where Duncan admitted to speaking with private firms about a sale. This came after the Saskatchewan Party passed the controversial Bill 40 in 2016; the bill defined privatization in a way that would allow the government to sell up to 49% of a crown corporation. However, the bill proved unpopular and was repealed in 2017.

When Scott Moe succeeded Wall as premier in 2018, Duncan maintained his portfolio as the Minister of Environment—a portfolio he inherited from Moe—in Moe's cabinet.

=== Minister under Scott Moe ===
==== Minister of Environment ====
Duncan held the environment portfolio at a time when the province was resisting federal planning to address climate change, and in particular the imposition of carbon pricing. Duncan was Environment Minister when Saskatchewan launched a court challenge against the federal Greenhouse Gas Pollution Pricing Act; Duncan stated in 2018 that he was confident the province could "put forward a very strong argument... as to why the federal government shouldn't have this ability." The case ultimately progressed to the Supreme Court, where in 2021 the Act was ruled constitutional, which resulted in Saskatchewan having to adopt a carbon pricing scheme.

Duncan introduced Saskatchewan's own climate change strategy in 2017, which originally did not feature carbon pricing. When the province unveiled the performance standards for the plan in 2018, Duncan stated that Saskatchewan would not be submitting the plan to Ottawa for assessment. While environmental critics offered praise to the Saskatchewan government for releasing a climate change plan for the first time, the plan, called "Prairie Resilience," was widely criticized as inadequate in its targets for reducing greenhouse gas (GHG) emissions and lacking in enforcement mechanisms.

In late 2019, Duncan announced that the government would not be meeting its pledge to reduce GHG emissions 20% by 2020, but unveiled a new, narrower target of a 40% reduction in SaskPower emissions by 2030.

==== Minister of Education ====
Duncan took on the education portfolio after the 2020 election and in the midst of the COVID-19 pandemic. Duncan persistently downplayed the need for public health measures in the school system, and at one point in 2021 wrote a letter to school divisions directing them to allow unvaccinated students to participate in extra-curricular activities, which at the time was in contravention of a directive by a local medical health officer. The Opposition education critic, Carla Beck, called for Duncan's resignation in January 2022 after it emerged that he lied about consulting with school divisions about delaying the start of the semester, as Saskatchewan was experiencing a new COVID wave with record case counts and high levels of hospitalization driven by the omicron variant.

In the summer of 2022, the Ministry of Education came under scrutiny after more than two dozen former students of a private Christian school in Saskatoon—one of many such schools that had begun receiving funding from the Saskatchewan Party government in 2012—came forward with allegations of abuse against current and former staff members at the school. Those students launched a class action lawsuit against the school, in which the government was also named as a defendant. The case brought funding for private schools, and in particular private religious schools, under increased scrutiny. In response to the allegations, Duncan appointed administrators to provide oversight at the school in question along with two other schools employing former staff from the first; those administrators also reported on the schools' finances and curriculum, which the Opposition later revealed to contain charges of financial impropriety.

Just weeks before the start of a new school year, in August 2023, Duncan unveiled new policies placing restrictions on sexual health education in Saskatchewan schools—including a ban on third party sexual health education—and requiring parental consent for children under the age of 16 who wished to change their preferred names or pronouns while at school. Duncan stated that the policy was an attempt to bolster "parental rights," while critics denounced the policy for potentially endangering vulnerable children. While it became clear that the Ministry did not consult its school divisions, the Saskatchewan Teachers' Federation, or the province's Advocate for Children in designing the policy, a national Christian lobbying group took credit for pushing the policy, claiming to have sent over 10,000 messages to Duncan and Moe and to have met with Duncan's staff earlier in 2023. The assistant deputy minister of education reported receiving 18 letters over the summer of 2023 that were in support of a similar policy that was introduced in New Brunswick. It was later reported that the policy was developed in only 9 days. The province's Advocate for Youth reviewed the policy and recommended extensive revisions, while the University of Regina's UR Pride centre launched a lawsuit against the government to try and have the policy repealed. On September 28, a Regina Court of King's Bench Justice granted an injunction against the policy, stating that "the protection of these youth surpasses that interest expressed by the government, pending a full and complete hearing." The policies would ultimately form the basis for the Parents' Bill of Rights, which was passed into law on October 20, 2023.

In a cabinet shuffle on August 29, 2023, Duncan was moved out of the Education portfolio and became the Minister of Crown Investments Corporation, responsible for the province's crown corporations.

==== Minister of Crown Investments Corporation ====
Duncan took over the crowns portfolio at a time of renewed tension between Regina and Ottawa surrounding the federal carbon tax. After the federal government decided to introduce limited carbon tax exemptions to home-heating oil, Saskatchewan argued that the exemption unfairly excluded natural gas, which is used by the majority of homes in Saskatchewan. The province quickly introduced legislation instructing SaskEnergy to stop remitting the carbon tax on natural gas, with Duncan apparently assuming full legal responsibility and stating that he was willing to go to "carbon jail" over the issue.

== Personal life ==
Raised in Halbrite, Duncan is a graduate of the Weyburn Comprehensive School and has a B.A. in History from the University of Regina. He has also completed the Canadian Securities Course. Prior to being elected in Weyburn-Big-Muddy, he worked as a researcher for the Saskatchewan Party caucus and in the provincial Department of Health.

== Electoral results ==
2020 Saskatchewan general election: Weyburn-Big Muddy
Party	Candidate	Votes	%
Saskatchewan	Dustin Duncan	5,972	77.00
New Democratic	Regan Lanning	1,021	13.17
Buffalo	Collin Keith	673	8.68
Green	Shane Caellaigh	89	1.15
Total valid votes		7,755	99.56
Source: Elections Saskatchewan

2016 Saskatchewan general election: Weyburn-Big Muddy
Party	Candidate	Votes	%
Saskatchewan	Dustin Duncan	6,177	78.73
New Democratic	Karen Wormsbecker	1,260	16.06
Green	Barry Dickie	155	1.97
Progressive Conservative	Glenn Pohl	131	1.66
Liberal	Dylan Hart	122	1.55
Total valid votes		7,845	100.0
Source: Elections Saskatchewan

2011 Saskatchewan general election: Weyburn-Big Muddy
Party	Candidate	Votes	%
Saskatchewan	Dustin Duncan	5,194	75.71
New Democratic	Ken Kessler	1,517	22.12
Green	Gene Ives	149	2.17
Total valid votes		6,860	100.0
Source: Saskatchewan Archives - Election Results by Electoral Division

2007 Saskatchewan general election: Weyburn-Big Muddy
Party	Candidate	Votes	%
Saskatchewan	Dustin Duncan	4,972	60.71
New Democratic	Sharon Elliott	2,060	25.15
Liberal	Colleen Christopherson-Cote	1,004	12.26
Green	Al Birchard	154	1.88
Total valid votes		8,190	100.0
Source: Saskatchewan Archives - Election Results by Electoral Division

June 19, 2006 by election: Weyburn-Big Muddy
Party	Candidate	Votes	%
Saskatchewan	Dustin Duncan	3,585	49.01
Liberal	David Karwacki	1,985	27.14
New Democratic	Graham Mickleborough	1,745	23.85
Total valid votes		7,315	100.0
Source: Saskatchewan Archives - Election Results by Electoral Division

== Cabinet positions ==
Saskatchewan provincial government of Scott Moe
Cabinet posts (3)
Predecessor	Office	Successor
Don Morgan	Minister of Crown Investments Corporation; August 29, 2023 – October 1, 2024	Jeremy Harrison
Gordon Wyant	Minister of Education; November 9, 2020 – August 29, 2023	Jeremy Cockrill
cont'd from Wall Ministry	Minister of Environment; February 2, 2018 – November 9, 2020	Warren Kaeding
Saskatchewan provincial government of Brad Wall
Cabinet posts (5)
Predecessor	Office	Successor
Scott Moe	Minister of Environment; August 30, 2017 – February 2, 2018	cont'd into Moe Ministry
Bill Boyd	Minister of Energy & Resources; August 23, 2016 – August 30, 2017	Nancy Heppner
Don McMorris	Minister of Health; May 25, 2012 – August 23, 2016	Jim Reiter
Nancy Heppner	Minister of the Environment; June 29, 2010 – May 25, 2012	Ken Cheveldayoff
Christine Tell	Minister of Tourism, Parks, Culture and Sport; May 29, 2009 – June 29, 2010	Bill Hutchinson
