= Allan Kerpan =

Canadian politician

Interim Deputy Leader of the Maverick Party
- In office June 2022 – February 28, 2025
- Succeeded by: Party collapsed

Member of the Legislative Assembly of Saskatchewan
- In office 2003–2007
- Preceded by: Carl Kwiatkowski
- Succeeded by: Fred Bradshaw
- Constituency: Carrot River Valley

Member of Parliament
- In office 1997–2000
- Preceded by: Riding established
- Succeeded by: Lynne Yelich
- Constituency: Blackstrap
- In office 1993–1997
- Preceded by: Rod Laporte
- Succeeded by: Riding dissolved
- Constituency: Moose Jaw—Lake Centre

Personal details
- Born: Allen Edward Joseph Kerpan; 9 December 1954 (age 71) Kenaston, Saskatchewan, Canada
- Party: Independent (2019–2020; 2025–present); Maverick Party (2020–2025); Saskatchewan Party (2003–2019); Canadian Alliance (2000); Reform Party of Canada (1993–2000)
- Spouse: Melanie Kieper (m. 1976)
- Occupation: Farmer

Allan Edward Joseph Kerpan (born 1954) is a Canadian politician. He was the long-serving Interim Deputy Leader of the Maverick Party, a right-wing Western Canadian separatist party.

== Life and career ==
Kerpan was born on 9 December 1954 in Kenaston, Saskatchewan. He attended public school in Kenaston from 1960 to 1972, but attended St Peter's College, Muenster, during 1969–70.

He was first elected to the House of Commons of Canada in the Moose Jaw—Lake Centre electoral district in the 1993 federal election. After realignment of riding boundaries, he was re-elected at the Blackstrap electoral district in the 1997 federal election. Kerpan was a member of the Reform Party, later renamed the Canadian Alliance. After serving in the 35th and 36th Canadian parliaments, he did not seek a third term of office, leaving federal politics as of the 2000 federal election.

Allan Kerpan was also a member of the Legislative Assembly of Saskatchewan as a member of the Saskatchewan Party. He entered provincial politics in June 2003 when he won a by-election at the Carrot River Valley riding succeeding Carl Kwiatkowski whose death left the provincial electoral district vacant. Later that year, Kerpan was re-elected in the general provincial elections, after the boundaries of Carrot River Valley were realigned.

Kerpan was succeeded in the riding of Carrot River Valley by the Saskatchewan Party's Fred Bradshaw.

Following the 2019 federal election, Kerpan became involved with the Western separatist movement known as Wexit Canada, later renamed the Maverick Party.
