= Fred Bradshaw =

Canadian politician

The Honourable Fred Bradshaw ECS

Member of the Saskatchewan Legislative Assembly for Carrot River Valley
- In office November 7, 2007 – October 1, 2024
- Preceded by: Allan Kerpan
- Succeeded by: Terri Bromm

Personal details
- Born: 1951 (age 74–75) Arborfield, Saskatchewan
- Party: Saskatchewan Party
- Other political affiliations: Conservative Party of Canada

Fred Bradshaw is a Canadian politician. He was elected to represent the electoral district of Carrot River Valley in the Legislative Assembly of Saskatchewan in the 2007 election. Born in Arborfield, Saskatchewan, he is a member of the Saskatchewan Party. On January 4, 2021, he was named Minister of Highways, after the resignation of Joe Hargrave. He was shuffled out of cabinet on May 31, 2022 and did not run for re-election in 2024.

== Electoral history ==
=== 2016 Saskatchewan general election ===
2016 Saskatchewan general election: Carrot River Valley
| Party | Candidate | Votes | % | ±% |
|---|---|---|---|---|
| Saskatchewan | Fred Bradshaw | 5,104 | 75.96 | +0.67 |
| New Democratic | Sandy Ewen | 1,369 | 20.37 | -1.82 |
| Liberal | Karalsingham Sadadcharan | 131 | 1.94 | +1.94 |
| Green | Koreena Lynn Fibke | 115 | 1.71 | -0.81 |
| Total valid votes | | – | 100.0 | |
| Eligible voters | | – | | |
| Saskatchewan hold | | Swing | | - |
Source: Elections Saskatchewan

=== 2011 Saskatchewan general election ===
2011 Saskatchewan general election: Carrot River Valley
| Party | Candidate | Votes | % | ±% |
|---|---|---|---|---|
| Saskatchewan | Fred Bradshaw | 4,903 | 75.29 | +13.55 |
| New Democratic | Arnold Schellenberg | 1,445 | 22.19 | –11.00 |
| Green | Spencer Bourassa | 164 | 2.52 | – |
| Total valid votes | | 6,512 | 100.0 | |
| Saskatchewan hold | | Swing | | +12.28 |

=== 2007 Saskatchewan general election ===
2007 Saskatchewan general election: Carrot River Valley
| Party | Candidate | Votes | % | ±% |
|---|---|---|---|---|
| Saskatchewan | Fred Bradshaw | 4,364 | 61.74 | +14.97 |
| New Democratic | Leigh Spencer | 2,346 | 33.19 | –8.80 |
| Liberal | Gerry MacNeill | 358 | 5.07 | –6.17 |
| Total valid votes | | 7,068 | 100.0 | |
| Saskatchewan hold | | Swing | | +11.88 |

== Cabinet positions ==
Saskatchewan provincial government of Scott Moe
Cabinet post (1)
| Predecessor | Office | Successor |
|---|---|---|
| Joe Hargrave | Minister of Highways; January 4, 2021–May 31, 2022 | Jeremy Cockrill |
