= Judy Bradley =

Canadian politician

Judy Llewellyn Bradley
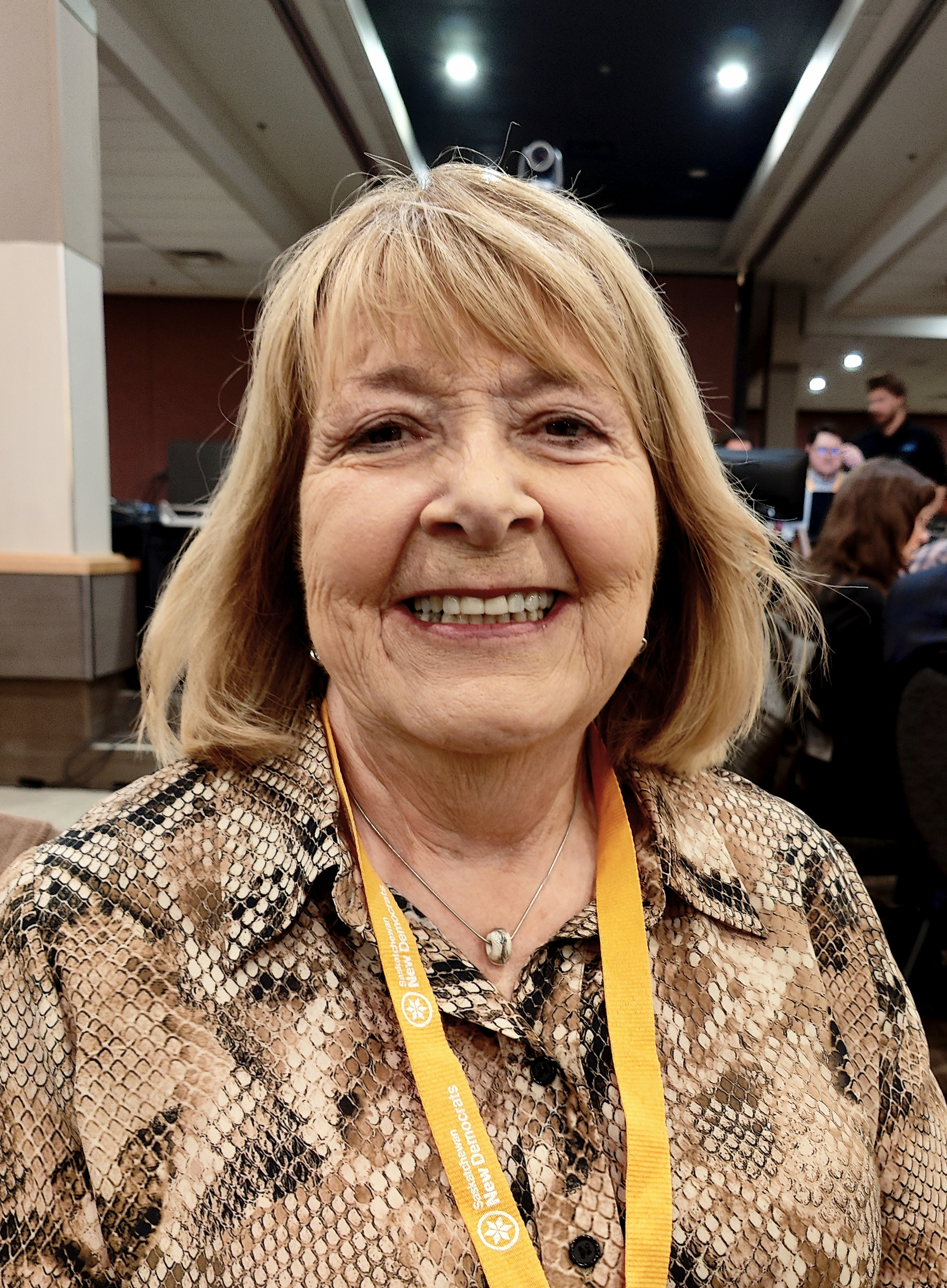

MLA for Bengough-Milestone
- In office 1991–1995
- Preceded by: Robert Pickering
- Succeeded by: riding dissolved

MLA for Weyburn-Big Muddy
- In office 1995–1999
- Preceded by: new district
- Succeeded by: Brenda Bakken

Personal details
- Born: October 18, 1952 (age 73) Regina, Saskatchewan
- Party: New Democrat
- Occupation: teacher

Judy Llewellyn Bradley, née Bratt (born October 18, 1952) is a Canadian former provincial politician. She was the Saskatchewan New Democratic Party member of the Legislative Assembly of Saskatchewan for the constituencies of Bengough-Milestone from 1991 to 1995, and Weyburn-Big Muddy from 1995 to 1999.
