= Robert Irvin Perkins =

Canadian politician and farmer

Robert Irvin "Bob" Perkins (June 30, 1898 – October 29, 1992) was a farmer and political figure in Saskatchewan. He represented Nipawin from 1960 to 1964 in the Legislative Assembly of Saskatchewan as a Co-operative Commonwealth Federation (CCF) member.

He was born in Owen Sound, Ontario, the son of Francis Albert Perkins and Annie Hewitson, and was educated in Sydenham, in Attica, Saskatchewan and in Lanigan. In 1925, he married Gladys Emma Burge. He was president of the Nipawin Rural Telephone Company and of the Codette Community Co-op Association. Perkins farmed near Codette, Saskatchewan. He was defeated by Frank Radloff when he ran for reelection to the provincial assembly in 1964. In 1975, he retired from farming and moved to Codette. In 1989, Perkins moved to Nipawin. He died at the age of 94 in 1992.
