= Estevan-Big Muddy =

Provincial electoral district in Saskatchewan, Canada

Coordinates: 49°15′N 103°40′W

Saskatchewan electoral district

Provincial electoral district
- Legislature: Legislative Assembly of Saskatchewan
MLA
Lori Carr
Saskatchewan
- District created: 1974
- First contested: 1975
- Last contested: 2020

Demographics
- Electors: 10,148
- Census division(s): Division 1, 2
- Census subdivision: Estevan

Estevan-Big Muddy is a provincial electoral district for the Legislative Assembly of Saskatchewan, Canada. The city of Estevan (pop. 10,084) is the largest centre in the constituency. Known as Saskatchewan's "Energy City", the area has rich deposits of oil, natural gas, and lignite coal. Provincial Highways 39 and 47 connect Estevan with the American state of North Dakota.

Smaller centres in the riding include the towns of Bienfait, Midale and Radville; and the villages of North Portal, Goodwater, Macoun, Oungre, Halbrite, Torquay, and Lake Alma.

For the 2024 general election, the riding gained most of the Big Muddy Badlands area from Weyburn-Big Muddy, and therefore was renamed from Estevan to Estevan-Big Muddy.

== Members of the Legislative Assembly ==
Legislature	Years	Member	Party
Estevan
18th	1975–1978	Robert Austin Larter	Progressive Conservative
19th	1978–1980	Robert Austin Larter	Progressive Conservative
19th	1980–1982	John Otho Chapman	New Democrat
20th	1982–1986	Grant Devine	Progressive Conservative
21st	1986–1991	Grant Devine	Progressive Conservative
22nd	1991–1995	Grant Devine	Progressive Conservative
23rd	1995–1999	Larry Ward	New Democrat
24th	1999–2003	Doreen Eagles	Saskatchewan Party
25th	2003–2007	Doreen Eagles	Saskatchewan Party
26th	2007–2011	Doreen Eagles	Saskatchewan Party
27th	2011–2016	Doreen Eagles	Saskatchewan Party
28th	2016–2020	Lori Carr	Saskatchewan Party
29th	2020–2024	Lori Carr	Saskatchewan Party
Estevan-Big Muddy
30th	2024–present	Lori Carr	Saskatchewan Party

== Election results ==
2024 Saskatchewan general election
Party	Candidate	Votes	%	±%
Saskatchewan	Lori Carr	5,277	69.97	+7.54
New Democratic	Phil Smith	973	12.90	+6.24
Buffalo	Phillip Zajac	755	10.01	-14.25
Saskatchewan United	Andrew Cey	453	6.01	–
Green	Billy Patterson	84	1.11	-0.53
Total valid votes		7,542	99.59	
Total rejected ballots		31	0.41	
Turnout		7,573	57.60	
Eligible voters		13,147		
Saskatchewan hold		Swing		
Source: Elections Saskatchewan

2020 Saskatchewan general election: Estevan
Party	Candidate	Votes	%	±%
Saskatchewan	Lori Carr	4,409	62.43	-15.42
Buffalo	Phil Zajac	1,713	24.26	–
New Democratic	Seth Lendrum	470	6.66	-2.40
Progressive Conservative	Linda Sopp	354	5.01	-3.81
Green	Scott Meyers	116	1.64	+0.37
Total valid votes		7,062	99.60	
Total rejected ballots		28	0.40	–
Turnout		7,090	–	–
Eligible voters		–		
Saskatchewan hold		Swing		–
Source: Elections Saskatchewan

2016 Saskatchewan general election: Estevan
Party	Candidate	Votes	%	±%
Saskatchewan	Lori Carr	5,454	77.85	-1.39
New Democratic	Tina Vuckovic	635	9.06	-8.21
Progressive Conservative	Paul Carroll	618	8.82	-
Liberal	Oskar Karkabatov	118	1.68	-
Independent	Cam Robock	91	1.29	–
Green	Branden Schick	89	1.27	-2.22
Total valid votes		7,005	100.0	
Eligible voters		–		
Source: Elections Saskatchewan

2011 Saskatchewan general election: Estevan
Party	Candidate	Votes	%	±%
Saskatchewan	Doreen Eagles	4,796	79.24	+13.06
NDP	Blair Schoenfeld	1,045	17.27	-1.52
Green	Sigfredo Gonzalez	211	3.49	+1.27
Total		6,052	100.00	

2007 Saskatchewan general election: Estevan
Party	Candidate	Votes	%	±%
Saskatchewan	Doreen Eagles	4,703	66.18	+14.86
NDP	Morris Johnson	1,335	18.79	-12.60
Liberal	Tim Seipp	910	12.81	-3.15
Green	Sigfredo Gonzalez	158	2.22	+0.89
Total		7,106	100.00	

2003 Saskatchewan general election: Estevan
Party	Candidate	Votes	%	±%
Saskatchewan	Doreen Eagles	3,522	51.32	+4.44
NDP	David Pattyson	2,154	31.39	+11.94
Liberal	Tim Seipp	1,095	15.96	-16.01
New Green	Sigfredo Gonzalez	91	1.33	-0.37
Total		6,862	100.00	

1999 Saskatchewan general election: Estevan
Party	Candidate	Votes	%	±%
Saskatchewan	Doreen Eagles	3,577	46.88	–
Liberal	Neil Collins	2,440	31.97	-0.50
NDP	Larry Ward	1,484	19.45	-16.16
New Green	Sigfredo Gonzalez	130	1.70	–
Total		7,631	100.00	

1995 Saskatchewan general election: Estevan
Party	Candidate	Votes	%	±%
NDP	Larry Ward	2,641	35.61	–
Liberal	Austin Gerein	2,408	32.47	–
Prog. Conservative	David Davis	2,367	31.92	–
Total		7,416	100.00	

== See also ==
- List of Saskatchewan provincial electoral districts
- List of Saskatchewan general elections
- Canadian provincial electoral districts
