= Frank Kenneth Radloff =

Canadian politician

Frank Kenneth Radloff (December 9, 1916 – May 15, 1995) was a merchant and political figure in Saskatchewan. He represented Nipawin from 1964 to 1971 in the Legislative Assembly of Saskatchewan as a Liberal.

He was born in Star City, Saskatchewan and was educated there. In 1938, Radloff married Inez Nygaard. He was president of Servu Stores Limited. Radloff served as mayor of the town of Nipawin from 1953 to 1963 and from 1974 to 1985, and was a member of the local school board from 1942 to 1952. He ran unsuccessfully for a seat in the provincial assembly in 1960 before being elected in 1964. Radloff was defeated by John Comer when he ran for reelection to the assembly in 1971. He died in Nipawin at the age of 78.
