= John Bruce Harris =

Canadian politician

John Bruce Harris (April 9, 1903 – October 1, 1983) was an educator, general merchant and political figure in Saskatchewan. He represented Torch River from 1944 to 1948 in the Legislative Assembly of Saskatchewan as a Co-operative Commonwealth Federation (CCF) member.

He was born in Smith Falls, Ontario to parents Thomas Harris and Mary Jane Jones, and was educated in Melfort, Saskatchewan, Prince Albert and Saskatoon. In 1932, Harris married Hilda Mae Carson. He taught school for 20 years. Harris lived in Choiceland where he managed the Co-op store. After retiring from politics, he returned to teaching school. In 1952, he moved to Tompkins to manage the Co-op store there, then suddenly returned to teaching in Choiceland; then, in 1960, departed for Edmonton, Alberta – where he taught until the early 1970s.
