= Lloyd Sauder =

Canadian politician

Lloyd David Sauder

MLA for Nipawin
- In office 1982–1991

Personal details
- Born: April 8, 1950 Carrot River, Saskatchewan
- Died: July 19, 2021 (aged 71) Carrot River, Saskatchewan
- Party: Progressive Conservative Party of Saskatchewan

Lloyd David Sauder (April 8, 1950 – July 19, 2021) was a Canadian politician. He served in the Legislative Assembly of Saskatchewan from 1982 to 1991, as a Progressive Conservative member for the constituency of Nipawin.
