= Brenda Bakken-Lackey =

Canadian politician

MLA for Weyburn-Big Muddy
- In office September 16, 1999 – February 28, 2006
- Preceded by: Judy Bradley
- Succeeded by: Dustin Duncan

Personal details
- Party: Saskatchewan Party

Brenda Bakken-Lackey is a Canadian former provincial politician. She was the Saskatchewan Party member of the Legislative Assembly of Saskatchewan for the constituency of Weyburn-Big Muddy from 1999 to 2006.

Known as Brenda Bakken when she first entered electoral politics, she later hyphenated her married name with her maiden name.
