= James Archibald Kiteley =

Canadian politician

James Archibald Kiteley (March 23, 1886 – 1965) was a physician and political figure in Saskatchewan. He represented Torch River in the Legislative Assembly of Saskatchewan from 1938 to 1944 as a Liberal.

He was born in Simcoe County, Ontario and, in 1905, moved with his mother and brothers to a homestead in Tugaske, Saskatchewan. Kiteley studied medicine at the University of Manitoba, receiving his M.D. in 1915, and set up practice in Tugaske. In 1919, he moved north to the Nipawin area. Kiteley retired from medical practice in 1960.
