= John Robert Denike =

Canadian politician

John Robert Denike (November 22, 1903 – 1985) was a political figure in Saskatchewan. He represented Torch River from 1948 to 1952 in the Legislative Assembly of Saskatchewan as a Co-operative Commonwealth Federation (CCF) member.

He was born in Summerland, British Columbia, the son of Stephen Denike and Isla Sirman, and was educated there and in Victoria. In 1929, Denike married Delchen Gentner. He lived in Nipawin, Saskatchewan.
