= Len Taylor =

Canadian politician

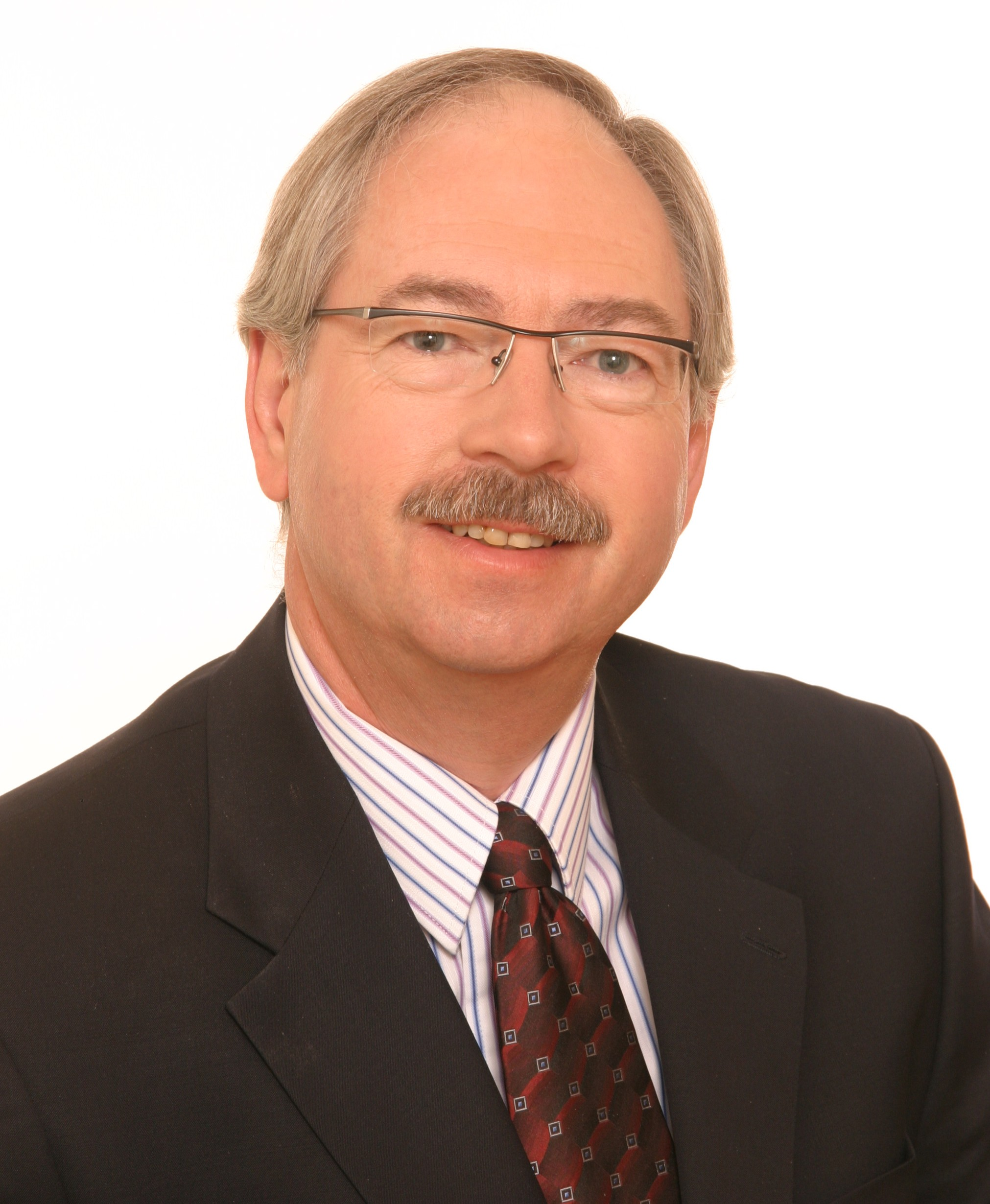

Member of the Saskatchewan Legislative Assembly for The Battlefords
- In office November 5, 2003 – October 10, 2011
- Preceded by: Jack Hillson (North Battleford)
- Succeeded by: Herb Cox

Member of Parliament for The Battlefords—Meadow Lake
- In office November 21, 1988 – June 2, 1997
- Preceded by: John Kenneth Gormley
- Succeeded by: Gerry Ritz (Battlefords—Lloydminster)

Personal details
- Born: January 16, 1952 (age 74) North Battleford, Saskatchewan

Leonard William "Len" Taylor (born January 16, 1952) is a Canadian politician and a former member of the Legislative Assembly of Saskatchewan, representing The Battlefords. Taylor is a member of the Saskatchewan New Democratic Party.

From 2000 to 2003, and again since 2016, he served on the North Battleford, Saskatchewan city council, and was a federal NDP Member of Parliament in the House of Commons of Canada from 1988 until 1997, when he was defeated. He served as the party's House Leader from 1994 to 1996.

Taylor was first elected to the Legislative Assembly of Saskatchewan in the re-created district of The Battlefords in 2003, and was named to cabinet following the election as Minister of Government Relations. He became been Saskatchewan's Minister of Health in February 2006, and was previously Government House Leader in the Saskatchewan New Democratic Party (NDP) government. Taylor left government when his party was relegated to the opposition benches in the 2007 election, but held his own seat. He was defeated by Saskatchewan Party challenger Herb Cox in the 2011 election.

Prior to entering politics, Taylor worked as a journalist.

== Electoral record ==
2011 Saskatchewan election
Party	Candidate	Votes	%	±%
Saskatchewan	Herb Cox	3,527	51.06%	+11.40%
NDP	Len Taylor	2,475	35.83%	-7.99%
Liberal	Ryan Bater	812	11.76%	-1.60%
Green	Owen Swiderski	93	1.35%	-1.04%
Total		6,907	100.00%	
Saskatchewan gain from New Democratic		Swing		-

2007 Saskatchewan general election: The Battlefords
Party	Candidate	Votes	%	±%
New Democratic	Len Taylor	3,332	43.81%	+1.29
Saskatchewan	Herb Cox	3,020	39.71%	+13.83
Liberal	Ryan Bater	1,016	13.36%	−16.34
Green	Reid Steward	180	2.39%	*
Western Independence	Gordon Elias	57	0.76%	−1.18
Total		7,605	100.00%	

2003 Saskatchewan election, The Battlefords (provincial electoral district)
Party	Candidate	Votes	%	±%
NDP	Len Taylor	3,056	42.53%	*
Liberal	Jack Hillson	2,134	29.70%	*
Saskatchewan	Larry Doke	1,856	25.83%	*
Western Independence	Gordon Elias	139	1.94%	*
Total		7,185	100.00%	

1997 Canadian federal election: Battlefords—Lloydminster
Party	Candidate	Votes	%	±%	Expenditures
Reform	Gerry Ritz	13,125	42.7	–	$37,206
New Democratic	(x) Len Taylor	8,535	27.8	–	$49,152
Liberal	Glenn Hornick	6,155	20.0	–	$43,136
Progressive Conservative	Ken Ritter	2,888	9.4	–	$22,635
Total valid votes		30,703	100.0		–
Total rejected ballots		91	0.3		
Turnout		30,794	63		
