= Herb Cox =

Canadian politician (1950–2025)

The Honourable Herb Cox

Member of the Saskatchewan Legislative Assembly for The Battlefords
- In office November 7, 2011 – September 29, 2020
- Preceded by: Len Taylor
- Succeeded by: Jeremy Cockrill

Personal details
- Born: August 21, 1950 Brandon, Manitoba, Canada
- Died: November 16, 2025 (aged 75) North Battleford, Saskatchewan, Canada
- Party: Saskatchewan Party
- Occupation: Realtor

Herb Cox (August 21, 1950 – November 16, 2025) was a Canadian politician, who was elected to the Legislative Assembly of Saskatchewan in the 2011 election, representing the electoral district of The Battlefords as a member of the Saskatchewan Party. He was born in Brandon, Manitoba.

Cox served in the cabinet of Premier Brad Wall twice, first as Minister of Environment and later briefly as Minister of Advanced Education.

In 2012, Cox revealed that he had been diagnosed with bone cancer two days after his election victory, and had received chemotherapy treatment for the disease. He died 13 years later, on November 16, 2025, at the age of 75. Following his death, flags at the legislature were lowered to half mast the same day in honour of his memory.

Saskatchewan provincial government of Brad Wall
Cabinet posts (2)
Predecessor	Office	Successor
Kevin Doherty	Minister of Advanced Education; October 30, 2017–February 2, 2018	Tina Beaudry-Mellor
Scott Moe	Minister of Environment; May 21, 2015–August 23, 2016	Scott Moe
