= Michael Weger =

Canadian politician

The Honourable Michael Weger ECS MLA

Member of the Saskatchewan Legislative Assembly for Weyburn-Bengough
- Incumbent
- Assumed office October 1, 2024
- Preceded by: Dustin Duncan

Personal details
- Party: Saskatchewan Party
- Education: University of Regina (BA); University of Saskatchewan (JD)

Michael Weger is a Canadian politician and lawyer. He was elected to the Legislative Assembly of Saskatchewan in the 2024 general election, representing Weyburn-Bengough as a member of the Saskatchewan Party.

== Political career ==
On December 11, 2025, Weger became Saskatchewan’s Minister of Community Safety, and Minister responsible for the Saskatchewan Public Safety Agency.
