= Thomas Russell MacNutt =

Canadian politician

Thomas Russell MacNutt (September 28, 1895 – February 21, 1973) was a merchant and political figure in Saskatchewan. He represented Nipawin from 1952 to 1956 in the Legislative Assembly of Saskatchewan as a Liberal.

He was born in Saltcoats, Saskatchewan, the son of Thomas MacNutt and Margaret McFayden, and was educated there and at the College of Agriculture in Saskatoon. MacNutt served in France with the Third Battalion, Canadian Machine Gun Corps during World War I, was commander of the First Battalion, King's Own Rifles of Canada on the Pacific Coast from 1932 to 1938 and also served in the army during World War II. He married Pearl Rusk. MacNutt was secretary-treasurer for the rural municipality of Saltcoats from 1926 to 1947. He served on the town councils for Saltcoats and Arborfield. MacNutt was unsuccessful candidate for the Melfort seat in the Canadian House of Commons in 1949. He was defeated by Leo Nicholson when he ran for reelection to the provincial assembly in 1956.
