= Kelsey-Tisdale =

Former provincial electoral district in Saskatchewan, Canada

Kelsey-Tisdale was a provincial electoral district for the Legislative Assembly of the province of Saskatchewan, Canada, encompassing the towns of Hudson Bay, Carrot River, and Tisdale.

Created as "Tisdale-Kelsey" before the 17th Saskatchewan general election in 1971, this riding was dissolved before the 23rd Saskatchewan general election in 1995. It is now part of the constituencies of Melfort and Carrot River Valley.

== Members of the Legislative Assembly ==
=== Tisdale-Kelsey (1971–1975) ===
#	MLA	Served	Party
1.	John Rissler Messer	1971–1975	New Democrat

=== Kelsey-Tisdale (1975–1995) ===
#	MLA	Served	Party
1.	John Messer	1975–1980	New Democrat
2.	Neal Hardy	Dec. 1980 – 1991	Progressive Conservative
3.	Andy Renaud	1991–1995	New Democrat

== Election results ==
1971 Saskatchewan general election: Tisdale-Kelsey electoral district
Party	Candidate	Votes	%	±%
NDP	John Rissler Messer	4,761	57.84%	–
Liberal	Gerald V. O’Bryne	3,050	37.06%	–
Prog. Conservative	Walter Lisitza	420	5.10%	–
Total		8,231	100.00%	

1975 Saskatchewan general election: Kelsey-Tisdale electoral district
Party	Candidate	Votes	%	±%
NDP	John Rissler Messer	3,750	47.79%	−10.05
Liberal	Alan E. Caithcart	2,266	28.88%	−8.18
Progressive Conservative	Jack Ukrainetz	1,831	23.33%	+18.23
Total		7,847	100.00%	

1978 Saskatchewan general election: Kelsey-Tisdale electoral district
Party	Candidate	Votes	%	±%
NDP	John Rissler Messer	4,031	50.27%	+2.48
Progressive Conservative	Neal Hardy	3,461	43.16%	+19.83
Liberal	P. Hudson Foga	527	6.57%	−22.31
Total		8,019	100.00%	

November 26, 1980 By-election: Kelsey-Tisdale electoral district
Party	Candidate	Votes	%	±%
Progressive Conservative	Neal Hardy	3,334	48.39%	+5.23
NDP	Lars Bracken	3,232	46.91%	−3.36
Liberal	Jim Russell	324	4.70%	−1.87
Total		6,890	100.00%	

1982 Saskatchewan general election: Kelsey-Tisdale electoral district
Party	Candidate	Votes	%	±%
Progressive Conservative	Neal Hardy	5,171	60.81%	+12.42
NDP	Francis E. Schmeichel	2,878	33.84%	−13.07
Western Canada Concept	John Kenneth McConaghie	284	3.34%	–
Liberal	P. Hudson Foga	139	1.63%	−3.07
Aboriginal People's	Olga Flesjer	32	0.38%	–
Total		8,504	100.00%	

1986 Saskatchewan general election: Kelsey-Tisdale electoral district
Party	Candidate	Votes	%	±%
Progressive Conservative	Neal Hardy	4,448	54.19%	−6.62
NDP	Mike Martyn	3,452	42.05%	+8.21
Liberal	Bill Soloway	309	3.76%	+2.13
Total		8,209	100.00%	

1991 Saskatchewan general election: Kelsey-Tisdale electoral district
Party	Candidate	Votes	%	±%
NDP	Andy Renaud	3,871	51.57%	+9.52
Prog. Conservative	Neal Hardy	2,783	37.07%	−17.12
Liberal	Walt Roberts	853	11.36%	+7.60
Total		7,507	100.00%	

== See also ==
- List of Saskatchewan provincial electoral districts
- List of Saskatchewan general elections
- Canadian provincial electoral districts
