= Dennis Marvin Ham =

Canadian businessman and politician (1941–2019)

Dennis Marvin Ham (March 14, 1941 – January 12, 2019) was a businessman and political figure in Saskatchewan, Canada. He represented Swift Current from 1975 to 1982 in the Legislative Assembly of Saskatchewan as a Progressive Conservative and then Unionest Party member.

He was born in Swift Current, Saskatchewan, the son of Thomas Edward Ham. In 1963, Ham married Sandra Gail Irene Piedalue. He left the Provincial Conservative caucus in 1980 to join Dick Collver in the Unionest Party. Ham did not run for reelection to the Saskatchewan assembly in 1982.

He is the brother of former Saskatchewan Liberal party leader and former Saskatchewan Lieutenant Governor Lynda Haverstock. He died in Calgary, Alberta on January 12, 2019 at the age of 77.
