= Terri Bromm =

Canadian politician

Terri Bromm MLA

Member of the Saskatchewan Legislative Assembly for Carrot River Valley
- Incumbent
- Assumed office October 28, 2024
- Preceded by: Fred Bradshaw

Personal details
- Party: Saskatchewan Party

Terri Bromm is a Canadian politician who was elected to the Legislative Assembly of Saskatchewan in the 2024 general election, representing Carrot River Valley as a member of the Saskatchewan Party.

Prior to her election, Bromm served on the Tisdale town council. She graduated with a Bachelor of Science in Pharmacy from the University of Saskatchewan and served as a pharmacist for twenty-five years in the communities of Nipawin, Arborfield, and Tisdale as well as on the Saskatchewan College of Pharmacists.

She has two grown children with her husband, Ian.
