= Robert Austin Larter =

Canadian politician

MLA for Estavan
- In office 1975–1980
- Succeeded by: John Otho Chapman

Personal details
- Born: January 16, 1925 Belle Plaine, Saskatchewan, Canada
- Died: December 26, 2015 (aged 90) Estevan, Saskatchewan, Canada
- Party: Progressive Conservative Party of Saskatchewan
- Occupation: agriculture implement dealer

Robert Austin Larter (January 16, 1925 – December 26, 2015) was a Canadian politician. He served in the Legislative Assembly of Saskatchewan from 1975 to his resignation for health reasons in 1980, as a Conservative member for the constituency of Estevan. He was born in 1925 in Belle Plaine, Saskatchewan to a Canadian father and American mother. He attended the Banff School of Fine Arts and Chicago Vocational College. He married Phyllis Lorraine Gort in 1948 and had four children. He was an agriculture implement dealer. His wife, Phyllis died in 2011. He died on December 26, 2015.
