= John Otho Chapman =

Canadian politician

John Otho "Jack" Chapman (August 19, 1931 – March 6, 2011) was a power plant supervisor and political figure in Saskatchewan. He represented Estevan from 1980 to 1982 in the Legislative Assembly of Saskatchewan as a New Democratic Party (NDP) member.

He was born in Estevan, Saskatchewan and worked 35 years for SaskPower as a power engineer and plant supervisor. Chapman also served on the board for Luther College. He defeated Grant Devine in a 1980 by-election to win a seat in the provincial assembly after Robert Larter resigned from the assembly, citing health reasons. He was defeated by Devine when he ran for reelection in 1982. He died in 2011.
