= Bengough-Milestone =

Former provincial electoral district in Saskatchewan, Canada

Coordinates: 49°40′N 104°50′W

Bengough-Milestone was a provincial electoral district for the Legislative Assembly of Saskatchewan, Canada. This constituency was created before the 1975 Saskatchewan general election. It was redistributed before the 1995 Saskatchewan general election.

== Member of the Legislative Assembly ==
#	MLA	Served	Party
1.	David Hadley Lange	1975 - 1978	New Democratic Party
2.	Robert Hugh Pickering	1978 - 1991	Prog. Conservative
3.	Judy Bradley	1991 - 1995	New Democratic Party

== Election results ==
Saskatchewan General Election 1975: Bengough-Milestone
Party	Candidate	Votes	%	±%
New Democratic	David Hadley Lange	2,819	38.84	-
Prog. Conservative	E.R. Moody	2,512	34.61	-
Liberal	Grant Frank	1,927	26.55	-
Total		7,258	100.00	

Saskatchewan General Election 1978: Bengough-Milestone
Party	Candidate	Votes	%	±%
Prog. Conservative	Robert Hugh Pickering	3,118	43.28	-
New Democratic	Jim Liggett	3,069	42.60	-
Liberal	Rod MacDonald	1,018	14.13	-
Total		7,205	100.00^{(1)}	

Saskatchewan General Election 1982: Bengough-Milestone
Party	Candidate	Votes	%	±%
Prog. Conservative	Robert Hugh Pickering	4,561	59.75	-
New Democratic	Jim Liggett	2,653	34.75	-
Liberal	Tim Maloney	420	5.50	-
Total		7,634	100.00	

Saskatchewan General Election 1986: Bengough-Milestone
Party	Candidate	Votes	%	±%
Prog. Conservative	Robert Hugh Pickering	3,740	54.50	-
New Democratic	Jim Liggett	2,406	35.06	-
Liberal	Brent Knudsen	716	10.43	-
Total		6,862	100.00^{(1)}	

Saskatchewan General Election 1991: Bengough-Milestone
Party	Candidate	Votes	%	±%
New Democratic	Judy Bradley	2,419	37.91	-
Prog. Conservative	Darrell Rodine	2,297	36.00	-
Liberal	Laurie Unruh	1,665	26.09	-
Total		6,381	100.00	

== See also ==
- List of Saskatchewan provincial electoral districts
- List of Saskatchewan general elections
- Canadian provincial electoral districts

== Notes ==
1. Percentages may not add up exactly due to rounding
