= Dick Collver =

Canadian politician

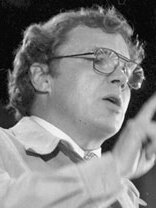

Leader of the Opposition (Saskatchewan)
- In office 1978–1979
- Preceded by: Ted Malone
- Succeeded by: Eric Berntson

MLA for Nipawin
- In office 1975–1982
- Preceded by: John Comer
- Succeeded by: Lloyd Sauder

Personal details
- Born: February 13, 1936 Toronto, Ontario
- Died: August 7, 2014 (aged 78) Thailand
- Party: Progressive Conservative, Unionest Party
- Profession: Accountant

Richard Lee Collver (February 13, 1936 – August 7, 2014) led the Saskatchewan Progressive Conservative (PC) Party from 1973 to 1978.

Born in Toronto, Collver earned an arts degree in economics from the University of Alberta, and articled as an accountant for Price Waterhouse in Calgary before moving to Saskatchewan in 1965. He was defeated in a run for the Saskatoon mayoralty, but attracted the attention of the then-moribund Saskatchewan PC Party, and gained its leadership in 1973. The party under Collver began its road to revitalization, and won seven seats with over 28% of the vote in the 1975 election, including Collver's seat in Nipawin. It became the official opposition after winning two by-elections and convincing two Liberal Members of the Legislative Assembly (MLAs), including Colin Thatcher, to defect to the PCs.

Though Collver's PCs won 38% of the vote and 17 MLAs in the 1978 election, Collver was disappointed with the result, feeling convinced he was going to win the election. He was facing lawsuits over his business endeavours, and became the target of attacks by the Saskatchewan New Democratic Party during the election. Collver stepped down as PC leader in 1979.

He was charged with illegal possession and improper use of a firearm after he discharged a .357 Magnum gun from the window of his Regina apartment on the night of his resignation. He was still involved in a $1 million lawsuit with the Saskatchewan government at the time.

He formed the Unionest Party in 1980, which advocated that Saskatchewan and other western Canadian provinces should join the United States. The party soon folded, and Collver retired to a ranch he purchased in Wickenburg, Arizona.

According to a column in the Montreal Gazette by Allan Fotheringham, Collver claimed that the 1980 federal election proved that the Canadian federation could not work. Fotheringham quoted Collver as saying that he had ruled out independence for western Canada, as advocated by the Western Canada Concept and other small parties at the time, because:

"Unfortunately, world events demand that those of us who believe in individual freedom and liberty must unite in the common cause against ever-increasing Russian domination of the world. Balkanization will only invite weakness and subversive activity designed to thwart freedom-loving peoples."

Collver briefly returned to Saskatchewan in 1984, to testify against Colin Thatcher in the trial that convicted him of the murder of his ex-wife Joanne Wilson. Collver said under oath that Thatcher, in a visit to Collver's ranch in Arizona, approached him for help in the search for a hit-man to kill Wilson.

Collver died on August 7, 2014, in Thailand, where he had been living for the previous 12 years.
