= Carl Kwiatkowski =

Canadian politician

Mayor of Porcupine Plain, Saskatchewan
- In office ?–1999

Member of the Saskatchewan Legislative Assembly for Carrot River Valley
- In office 1999 – 2003 (his death)
- Succeeded by: Allan Kerpan

Personal details
- Born: Carl Edward Kwiatkowski; November 20, 1959; Porcupine Plain, Saskatchewan, Canada
- Died: 2 February 2003 (aged 43); Carrot River, Saskatchewan, Canada

Carl Edward Kwiatkowski (November 20, 1959 – February 2, 2003) was a political figure in Saskatchewan. He represented Carrot River Valley from 1999 to 2003 in the Legislative Assembly of Saskatchewan as a Saskatchewan Party member.

He was born in Porcupine Plain, Saskatchewan and was educated there. After completing his schooling, he worked in road construction and on oil rigs. In 1982, Kwiatkowski married Leona Kistner. He later was general manager for the Porcupine Opportunities Program and served as president of the Saskatchewan Association of Rehabilitation Centres. Kwiatkowski served three terms as mayor of Porcupine Plain. He was also a justice of the peace. Kwiatkowski died in office at the age of 43. He was found dead in his Carrot River constituency office.
