= Unionest Party =

- Leader: Dick Collver
- Founder: Dick Collver
- Founded: 1980
- Dissolved: 1982
- Ideology: Western alienation Neoconservatism; Pro-US annexation
- Political position: Right wing
- Politics of Saskatchewan; Political parties; Former provincial party

The Unionest Party was a political party in Saskatchewan, Canada, in the early 1980s. The party advocated for a union between the four Western Canadian provinces—British Columbia, Alberta, Saskatchewan, and Manitoba—and the United States. The party's name is a portmanteau of ‘best' and 'union’.

== Party history ==
The party was founded in March 1980 by Dick Collver. Collver led the Saskatchewan Progressive Conservative Party for much of the 1970s, and has been credited with reviving the Party's electoral prospects. Under his leadership, the party returned to the provincial legislature for the first time in more than a decade in 1975 and formed the Official Opposition in 1978. The party would go on to form a majority government in the 1982 election. However, in 1979 Collver resigned as leader of the PCs and months later announced the formation of his new party, the Unionest Party.

The Unionest Party was an expression of western alienation sentiment, or a dissatisfaction in western provinces with the state of federal politics informed by a sense that western interests were not being taken seriously. Such sentiments grew over the course of the 1970s when resource prices increased dramatically, and western provinces and the federal government—then under Pierre Trudeau's Liberals—engaged in legal battles over control of resources and revenues. Collver's Unionests were not the only new party advocating for secession from Canada; Western Canada Concept was a federal party building a platform on independence for the west. However, the Unionests were unique in advocating for the western provinces to join the United States.

The party was formed shortly after the 1980 federal election, which Collver argued proved that the Canadian federation was not functioning. He also argued that increased "balkanization" through the creation of a new western Canadian nation would weaken the position of the west in the Cold War; as such, he explained that "those of us who believe in individual freedom and liberty must unite in the common cause against ever-increasing Russian domination of the world."

Days after announcing the new party, Collver recruited another PC MLA, Dennis Ham, to join the Unionest Party, giving the fledgling movement two sitting MLAs. Ham was the brother of Lynda Haverstock, who later became the leader of the Saskatchewan Liberal Party and the Lieutenant Governor of Saskatchewan. The Party also unsuccessfully sought official status in neighbouring Alberta.

According to Saskatchewan historian Bill Waiser, the push by the party to have the province join the United States was seen as particularly treasonous. In response to the new party, the New Democratic Party government passed retroactive legislation intended to restrict third party status—and the public funding that comes with it—to a party with at least two sitting members that was registered under the Election Act on the day of the last general election. Collver responded to the legislation with a 38-hour filibuster.

The Unionest Party was not able to gain traction, and neither Collver nor Ham sought re-election in 1982. As such, the short-lived Unionest Party never contested an election.

== See also ==
- Western Canada Concept
- Parti 51
- Republican Party of Alberta
- List of Canadian political parties
- Secessionist movements of Canada
