= John Kristian Comer =

Canadian politician (1944–2025)

John K. Comer

MLA for Nipawin
- In office 1971–1975

Personal details
- Born: November 30, 1944 Pine Falls, Manitoba, Canada
- Died: November 6, 2025 (aged 80)
- Party: Saskatchewan New Democratic Party

John Kristian Comer (November 30, 1944 – November 6, 2025) was a Canadian politician. He served in the Legislative Assembly of Saskatchewan from 1971 to 1975, as a NDP member for the constituency of Nipawin. Comer died on November 6, 2025, at the age of 80.
