= David Manly Miner =

Canadian farmer and politician from Saskatchewan (born 1937)

David Manly Miner (born June 26, 1937) is a farmer and former political figure in Saskatchewan, Canada. He represented The Battlefords from 1980 to 1982 in the Legislative Assembly of Saskatchewan as a New Democratic Party (NDP) member.

He was born in Speers, Saskatchewan, the son of Herman Manly Miner. In 1961, Miner married Mona Gail Mclvor. Miner served as vice chairman of the Saskatchewan Land Bank Commission. He was first elected to the provincial assembly in a 1980 by-election held after Eiling Kramer retired from politics. Miner was defeated by Myles Morin when he ran for reelection in 1982.
