= Larry Ward (politician) =

Canadian politician

MLA for Estevan
- In office 1995–1999

Personal details
- Born: October 14, 1947 (age 78) Regina, Saskatchewan
- Party: Saskatchewan New Democratic Party

Larry Campbell Ward (born October 14, 1947) was a Canadian politician who served in the Legislative Assembly of Saskatchewan from 1995 to 1999, as a NDP member for the constituency of Estevan.
