= John Rissler Messer =

Canadian politician

The Honourable Jack Messer ECS

Member of the Legislative Assembly of Saskatchewan
- In office 1971–1980

Personal details
- Born: May 26, 1941 (age 84) Tisdale, Saskatchewan
- Party: Saskatchewan New Democratic Party

John Rissler "Jack" Messer (born May 26, 1941) is a farmer and former political figure in Saskatchewan. He represented Kelsey from 1967 to 1971, Tisdale-Kelsey from 1971 to 1975 and Kelsey-Tisdale from 1975 to 1980 in the Legislative Assembly of Saskatchewan as a New Democratic Party (NDP) member.

He was born in Tisdale, Saskatchewan, the son of William Frederick Messer and Margaret Elizabeth Rissler, and was educated there and in Vancouver, British Columbia. Messer worked in Vancouver before continuing his studies at the University of British Columbia and the University of Saskatchewan. He then returned to Tisdale and settled on a farm near the town. In 1960, he married Joanne Bryson, the daughter of Hugh Alexander Bryson. He was secretary of the Tisdale Wheat Pool Committee and a director for the Evington Rural Telephone Company. Messer served in the Saskatchewan cabinet as Minister of Agriculture, as Minister of Industry and Commerce and as Minister of Mineral Resources. He resigned from cabinet and the assembly in 1980. In 1990, Messer became provincial secretary for the Saskatchewan NDP. From 1991 to 1998, he was president of SaskPower. He then returned to farming. Messer has also served as a director for Ducks Unlimited Canada and was the organizations' president from 2003 to 2004. He lives in Tisdale, as of 2026.
