= Progressive Conservative Party of Saskatchewan =

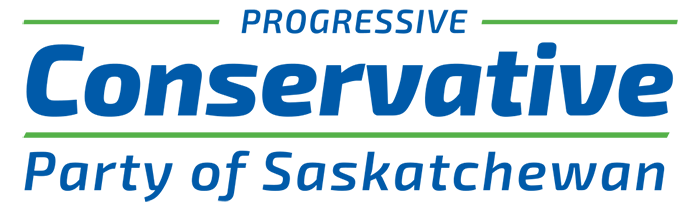
- Leader: Rose Buscholl
- President: Alan Evans
- Founded: 1905
- Preceded by: North-West Territories Liberal-Conservative Party (1897–1903); Territorial Conservative Association (1903–1905); Provincial Rights Party (1905–1912); Conservative Party (1912–1942)
- Headquarters: 3928 Gordon Road Regina, Saskatchewan S4S 6Y3
- Membership (2018): 80
- Ideology: Conservatism
- Political position: Centre-right
- Colours: Blue and green
- Seats in Legislature: 0 / 61

Website
- www.pcsask.ca

The Progressive Conservative Party of Saskatchewan is a conservative political party in the Canadian province of Saskatchewan. Founded in 1905 by former Northwest Territories Premier Frederick Haultain, the party was first known as the Provincial Rights Party. In 1912, its name changed to the Conservative Party of Saskatchewan, and in 1942 it adopted its current name. Members are commonly known as Tories.

The party has formed government in Saskatchewan three times, first in a coalition government from 1929 to 1934, and then in consecutive majority governments from 1982 to 1991. The party was badly damaged by an expense fraud scandal in the 1990s. In 1997, the party went dormant when much of its membership migrated to the newly established Saskatchewan Party. Although the party has been active again since the 2007 provincial election, no PC candidates have been elected since 1995.

== History ==
=== Early years (1905–1934) ===
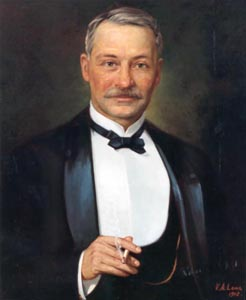
A portrait of the party's first leader, Frederick Haultain.

The party was founded in 1905. Saskatchewan joined Confederation on September 1, 1905, and its first election was slated for December of that year. Former Northwest Territories Premier Frederick Haultain had been instrumental in the granting of provincehood. However, while he had advocated for the creation of one large western province—for which he favoured the name Buffalo—Wilfrid Laurier's federal government opted to create two new provinces instead, with Alberta joining Confederation alongside Saskatchewan. Moreover, like Manitoba a generation earlier, the two new provinces were denied rights over their natural resources. In response, Haultain re-branded his Territorial Conservative Association as the Provincial Rights Party in a bid to become premier of Saskatchewan.

Haultain's party was defeated by the Liberal Party in the 1905 election, becoming the Official Opposition with 47.5% of the vote. The 1908 election brought a similar result, with the PR party remaining in Opposition. In 1912, Haultain left politics when he was appointed the Chief Justice of Saskatchewan. When he left, the party opted to re-adopt the Conservative name under the leadership of Wellington Willoughby. The change did not improve the party's fortunes; it lost a third straight election in 1912 to the Liberals and Premier Walter Scott, with its share of the vote falling to 42%. In fact, the Liberals built an impressive political dynasty, securing further majority governments in 1917, 1921, and 1925. In 1921, the Tories were reduced to third-party status as the agrarian Progressive Party gained Opposition status. However, party fortunes began to improve when James T. M. Anderson became leader in 1924.

Anderson had moved to Saskatchewan in 1908 to be a teacher, and in 1918 the Liberal government appointed him as provincial director of education among new Canadians, a role in which he advocated for more assimilationist policies towards the rapidly growing immigrant population. The following decade, Anderson capitalized on the racial and religious animosity created by the rise of the Ku Klux Klan in Saskatchewan—the organization boasted 25,000 members in the province by 1929—to gain support for Conservative policies on immigration and education; in 1928, Liberal Premier Jimmy Gardiner claimed that the Klan was a tool of the Conservative Party. There certainly was crossover between the organizations, and the Conservatives aided Klan organization by providing it with party membership lists.

In the 1929 election, Anderson led the party to its best performance in the first half of the twentieth century, securing 36% of the popular vote and 24 of 63 seats. Despite having fewer seats than the Liberals' 28, the Conservatives were able to form a coalition government with the support of Progressive and Independents Legislative members (MLAs), and Anderson became Premier. What was known as the "Co-operative government" would introduce amendments to the Schools Act, banning French as a language of instruction and the display of religious symbols in Catholic schools, amendments applauded at the 1930 Klan convention. The government was also successful in curbing patronage through its Public Service Act.

The Anderson-led coalition took office immediately before the onset of the Great Depression, which proved particularly severe on the Prairies. The government's retrenchment in response—similar to R. B. Bennett's federal Conservative government—opened it to attacks from the Liberals as well as a new socialist political movement going by the name of Farmer–Labour, which would in 1935 become the Co-operative Commonwealth Federation (CCF). The government did establish the Saskatchewan Relief Commission to provide some aid to residents, but this did not address the systemic issues creating depression conditions. In 1932, Anderson asked Liberal leader Gardiner to join the coalition, but the Opposition refused. In the 1934 election, the Liberals returned to power and Anderson's Conservatives were wiped out, failing to win a single seat as the Farmer–Labour Group took over Official Opposition status.

=== Political wilderness (1934–1975) ===
After the 1934 defeat, Anderson stayed on as party leader until 1936, when the party chose a young lawyer, John Diefenbaker, as his successor. Although Diefenbaker would go on to revive the fortunes of the federal Progressive Conservatives in the 1950s, he was not able to gain ground as the provincial party leader. However, it was not just Diefenbaker. Between 1934 and 1975, only two PC members—the party adopted the Progressive Conservative name in 1942, in line with the federal party—would be elected to the Saskatchewan Legislature: one in a 1953 by-election, and party leader Martin Pederson in the 1964 election; neither was re-elected. Those years were marked by an effective return to a two-party system consisting of the Liberals and the CCF, the latter of which formed five successive majority governments from 1944 to 1964, after which it became the New Democratic Party (NDP). The PCs spent long periods without a leader, and in the early 1970s nearly merged with the provincial Social Credit party; PC members in fact approved the merger in November 1970, but it was ultimately rejected by Social Credit members in February 1971.

=== Return to the Legislature (1975–1982) ===
The PC party was rejuvenated by the leadership of Dick Collver, who took over the party reins in 1973. The Liberals had formed two consecutive majority governments from 1964 to 1971; however, they were soundly defeated by Allan Blakeney's NDP in 1971, and Liberal leader Ross Thatcher died just weeks after the election. Encouraged by the popularity of the federal PCs in Saskatchewan, Collver sensed an opportunity to gain ground, and presented himself as a populist leader railing against the big government of the NDP. The Tories returned to the legislature in the 1975 election, winning 7 seats to the Liberals' 15 and the NDP's 39, marking the first time since 1929 that three major parties had sizeable representation in the Legislature. The results were even better for the Tories in the 1978 election as they surged to Official Opposition status, winning 17 seats while the Liberals were shut out for the first time in provincial history.

In a twist, Collver resigned the party leadership in 1979 to sit as an Independent. Some within the party had begun to see Collver and his business dealings—he was embroiled in a lawsuit with the provincial Government Insurance Office—as a liability. As an Independent, he still focused his criticism on the NDP government. Then, in March 1980, he announced the formation of a new party, which he called the Unionest Party. Apparently seized by prevalent feelings of western alienation and anti-communism, Collver's new party advocated for a secession of Saskatchewan and the other western provinces from Canada and a union with the United States—the name Unionest was a portmanteau of "best" and "union". One other PC MLA, Dennis Ham, joined Collver in sitting as a Unionest, but neither ran for re-election in 1982 and the party was dissolved. Collver's abrupt departure from the PCs led to agricultural economist Grant Devine being named leader. Devine had lost his election bid in 1978, and he lost again in a 1980 by-election in the Estevan constituency. However, he stayed at the helm, leading the party into the 1982 election.

=== Devine government (1982–1991) ===
Devine led the Progressive Conservatives to a majority government for the first time in 1982, stunning the NDP by winning 55 out of 64 seats, reducing Blakeney's party to nine seats. Devine had run on a program of tax and mortgage relief and on promoting free enterprise under the slogan, "There's so much more we can be". Notably, not a single member of the PC caucus had experience in government, and observers have noted that during this term, Devine's government "lacked ideological clarity". The PCs did cut taxes—eliminating the province's 20% gasoline tax—and royalties, but it kept most government assets public and spent freely, rapidly running up a string of deficits. It used public money to support private ventures and, more than anything else, agriculture. The government offered a universal, low-interest loan program to farmers that cost the province $1 billion. By 1986, the government had raised the provincial debt to $1.5 billion. Part of Devine's strategy was a close relationship with Brian Mulroney's federal PC government, and in a particularly important move, Devine secured a $1 billion farming aid package from Ottawa on the eve of the 1986 election.

Saskatchewan historian Bill Waiser has argued that the Devine years marked a fundamental shift in Saskatchewan politics, with a widening divide between urban and rural Saskatchewan re-defining the province's political landscape. Similarly, political analyst Dale Eisler has written that Saskatchewan politics can be grouped into distinct "Before Devine" and "After Devine" categories. Devine's intent focus on rural priorities, and farming in particular, contributed to this divide. The results of the 1986 election bear this out. Blakeney's NDP narrowly edged out the PCs in the popular vote, but the concentration of that vote in urban centres—the NDP won 16 out of 20 seats in Regina and Saskatoon—allowed Devine's PC, who won a majority of rural seats, to form another majority government. In effect, Devine staked the PCs on rural support.

Possibly owing in part to the divided election result, and doubtless owing in part to a severe downturn in the provincial economy, Devine's government adopted a more distinct ideological approach in its second term, which observers have labelled a "new right" neoliberal approach of cuts to spending and substantial privatization. The government sold off major assets such as SaskOil and PotashCorp, which had been significant sources of revenue and key achievements of the previous NDP government. The PCs also attempted to privatize SaskEnergy, but a legislative walk-out by the Opposition—and a public petition with over 100,000 signatures—prevented it. During this term, the government was also criticized for undemocratic legislative tactics, including proroguing the Legislature and financing expenditures through the dubious use of special warrants. Outrage toward its conduct and agenda—the government's cuts to social spending precipitated what was one of the largest public protests in Regina history with approximately seven thousand people descending on the Legislature in 1987—along with the unpopularity of Mulroney's federal government and a growing fiscal crisis, which saw provincial debt soar to $13 billion by 1992, all led to Devine's government being defeated by the NDP in the 1991 election. By then, the fiscal crisis was so severe that the province was facing the risk of bankruptcy.

==== Thatcher murder conviction ====
In January 1983, energy minister Colin Thatcher resigned from cabinet. Days after Thatcher's resignation, his ex-wife JoAnn Wilson was murdered, and Thatcher was charged with the crime in May 1984. In November 1984, a jury found him guilty and Thatcher was sentenced to life in prison for 25 years.

==== Expense fraud scandal ====
In April 1995, after an RCMP investigation dubbed "Project Fiddle", police charged a dozen current and former PC MLAs as well as two caucus workers with fraud relating to an expense fraud scheme that ran from 1987 to 1991. In 1987, the caucus agreed to pool a portion of communications allowances into a central account. The party's director of communications, John Scraba, siphoned cash from this account and stashed it in safety deposit boxes. Another former staffer alleged that this was common knowledge, and that "if you needed money, all you had to do was go to John Scraba". Instances included former cabinet minister Joan Duncan, who pleaded guilty to fraud in the amount of $12,405, which was spent on a vacation in Hawaii, and former MLA Gerald Muirhead, who was found guilty of spending over $2,000 on an embroidered saddle and bridle sash.

Money was distributed through invoices from a series of shell companies for services that were never rendered or expenses that were illegitimate. Overall, the fraudulent expense claims totalled approximately $837,000. Police were first alerted to the scheme in 1991 when a legislative clerk reported suspicious invoices. In 1992, bank officials drilled into an unclaimed safety deposit box that contained $150,000; the box was addressed to the PC caucus office in the Saskatchewan Legislature. Nineteen staff or MLAs were charged in the scheme, and fifteen were convicted—including ten cabinet members and a caucus chair—with many serving jail time. Scraba was sentenced to two years in prison. Former MLA Michael Hopfner, whose defence claimed he was too financially incompetent to commit fraud, was sentenced to 18 months. The stiffest sentence went to former caucus chair Lorne McLaren at three and a half years. Other party members convicted in the scandal included Robert Andrew, Harry Baker, Eric Bernston, John Gerich, Grant Hodgins, Harold Martens, Beattie Martin, Michael McCafferty, Ray Meiklejohn, and Sherwin Petersen.

Former cabinet minister Jack Wolfe died by suicide in 1995. Already faced with the prospect of having to testify against former colleagues, Wolfe was informed by his lawyer on 2 February that he was going to be arrested; he was found dead that day.

Grant Devine was never charged in the fraud scheme; he testified that he was too busy to pay attention to finances and was unaware of the scheme, although he took responsibility as the leader of the party.

=== Opposition, the Sask Party, and dormancy (1991–2005) ===
The PCs were reduced to 10 seats in 1991 and became the Official Opposition. Devine resigned as PC leader in 1992, and Rick Swenson—who, like Devine, was not implicated in the expense fraud scandal—became interim leader. In 1994, the party chose Bill Boyd as its new permanent leader. Particularly when news began to break about the expense fraud scandal, the PCs were expected to be wiped out in the 1995 election. Boyd attempted to promote the party as the "New PCs", while some PC candidates left the party name off their campaign materials altogether. The PCs ultimately held on to five seats as the Liberals surpassed them to become the Opposition to Roy Romanow's NDP. Romanow had pursued further spending cuts in order to address the province's fiscal crisis. While the NDP had balanced the finances by 1995, extensive cuts to rural health and education services further exacerbated the urban-rural divide. With neither the PCs nor the Liberals seeing a clear path back to power, four MLAs from each party—including Boyd and all representing rural districts—agreed in 1997 to walk away from their parties and help establish a new conservative party in a bid to unite the opposition to the NDP. The Saskatchewan Party was officially registered on 17 September 1997, and with eight MLAs, it became the Official Opposition.

Most PC members migrated to the new party—Romanow liked to emphasize this by calling the new party the "Saskatories"—and the party executive voted to effectively put the scandal-plagued PC Party into dormancy for at least two election cycles. In order to remain registered, the party ran a handful of paper candidates in both the 1999 and 2003 provincial elections. However, with so much of the PC membership along with its office and executive staff moving to the new party, the perception that the Sask Party was merely a re-branded PC Party persisted for years. Even Devine publicly expressed support for the Saskatchewan Party. One member who tried but was unable to make the move to the new party was PC MLA Jack Gooshen, who was convicted in 1999 of consorting with a 14-year old prostitute.

=== Recent history (2005–present) ===
In June 2005, the dormant PCs announced that they were taking applications for new members, and that a members' meeting would be held to decide the future of the party. Changes to provincial electoral laws passed during the previous Legislature decreased the number of candidates a party needed to run in general elections from ten to two. In 2006, members voted to resurrect the party and chose former interim leader Swenson as its new permanent leader.

The party ran into difficulties when trying to access its trust fund, which reportedly contained close to $3 million. In 2007, the party sued the Saskatchewan Party over access to the fund, alleging that the fund's trustees—three of whom were active in the Sask Party—were conspiring with the Sask Party to deny them access and halt the PC party revival. The case was not settled until 2014, when Swenson announced that the PCs had been given control of the fund. In the meantime, the party ran five candidates in each of the 2007 and 2011 elections, capturing less than 0.5% of the overall vote in both elections. The party ran 18 candidates in the 2016 election, its largest number since 1995, and collected 1.3% of the vote while finishing third in 10 districts.

Swenson announced after the 2016 election that he would step aside as leader once a new leader was chosen. On November 3, 2018, Ken Grey was elected as the new leader of the party. In the 2020 provincial election, the party ran 31 candidates and captured 1.9% of the vote.

Grey resigned as leader on January 18, 2021. Later in the year, Grey alleged that conspiracy theorists and far-right elements were working to take over the party, a charge that the party denied. Grey cited as an example that he had been "inundated" with Islamophobic messages after he was photographed with an official from Pakistan in 2019. In November 2022, Rose Buscholl was appointed as interim leader in charge of a three-point revitalization plan, including building constituency organizations, engaging with members, and developing new policy. Party insiders also stated that a name change was likely for the party, since the 'progressive' term had been "usurped by liberal socialists".

In 2022, the party trust fund would again be at the centre of controversy. The party alleged that a group of political organizers had attempted a hostile takeover of the PCs, with a plan to rename the party the Saskatchewan Conservative Party and to install former Sask Party MLA Nadine Wilson as leader. The PCs reported that they rejected the attempted takeover, and that Wilson and the other organizers instead formed the Saskatchewan United Party. The PCs further alleged that Sask United organizers stole a hard drive containing member and donor information, a charge United organizers denied.

In 2023, Buscholl became the permanent leader of the party, removing the interim tag.

Ahead of the 2024 provincial election, Buscholl approached the far-right Buffalo Party to discuss a merger. On September 12, Buscholl announced that the PCs were calling off the merger discussions, citing Buffalo's "extensive focus on out-of-scope federal and international issues" as a barrier. The party ultimately finished in fifth place for the fifth consecutive election, receiving approximately one percent of the vote province wide.

== Election results ==
Election	Leader	Seats	Change	Place	Votes	%	Legislative role	Notes
1905	Frederick Haultain	9 / 25	▲9	▲2nd	16,184	47.5%	Opposition	Liberal majority
1908	Frederick Haultain	14 / 41	▲5	2nd	28,099	47.9%	Opposition	Liberal majority
1912	Wellington Willoughby	8 / 54	▼6	2nd	36,848	42.0%	Opposition	Liberal majority
1917	Wellington Willoughby	7 / 62	▼1	2nd	68,243	36.3%	Opposition	Liberal majority
1921	Donald Maclean	2 / 63	▼5	▼3rd	7,133	3.9%	Third party	Liberal majority
1925	James Anderson	3 / 63	▲1	3rd	45,515	18.4%	Third party	Liberal majority
1929	James Anderson	24 / 63	▲21	▲2nd	131,550	36.4%	Opposition	Liberal minority
1929	James Anderson	24 / 63	▲21	▲2nd	131,550	36.4%	Coalition	Coalition with Progressives
1934	James Anderson	0 / 55	▼24	▼3rd	114,923	26.8%	No seats	Liberal majority
1938	John Diefenbaker	0 / 52	Steady	▼5th	52,315	11.9%	No seats	Liberal majority
1944	Rupert Ramsay	0 / 52	Steady	▲3rd	42,511	10.69%	No seats	CCF majority
1948	Rupert Ramsay	0 / 52	Steady	▼4th	37,986	7.6%	No seats	CCF majority
1952	Alvin Hamilton	0 / 53	Steady	4th	10,648	2.0%	No seats	CCF majority
1956	Alvin Hamilton	0 / 53	Steady	4th	10,921	2.0%	No seats	CCF majority
1960	Martin Pederson	0 / 54	Steady	▲3rd	94,737	14.0%	No seats	CCF majority
1964	Martin Pederson	1 / 59	▲1	3rd	126,028	18.9%	Third party	Liberal majority
1967	Martin Pederson	0 / 59	▼0	3rd	41,583	9.8%	No seats	Liberal majority
1971	Ed Nasserden	0 / 60	Steady	3rd	9,659	2.1%	No seats	NDP majority
1975	Dick Collver	7 / 61	▲7	3rd	124,573	27.6%	Third party	NDP majority
1978	Dick Collver	17 / 61	▲10	▲2nd	181,045	38.1%	Opposition	NDP majority
1982	Grant Devine	55 / 64	▲38	▲1st	289,311	54.1%	Majority	
1986	Grant Devine	38 / 64	▼17	1st	244,382	44.6%	Majority	
1991	Grant Devine	10 / 66	▼28	▼2nd	137,994	25.5%	Opposition	NDP majority
1995	Bill Boyd	5 / 58	▼5	▼3rd	73,269	17.9%	Third Party	NDP majority
1999	Iris Dennis	0 / 58	▼5	▼5th	1,609	0.4%	No seats	NDP minority
2003	Iris Dennis	0 / 58	Steady	▼7th	681	0.2%	No seats	NDP majority
2007	Richard Swenson	0 / 58	Steady	▲5th	832	0.2%	No seats	Sask Party majority
2011	Richard Swenson	0 / 58	Steady	5th	1,315	0.3%	No seats	Sask Party majority
2016	Richard Swenson	0 / 61	Steady	5th	5,571	1.3%	No seats	Sask Party majority
2020	Ken Grey	0 / 61	Steady	5th	8,404	1.89%	No seats	Sask Party majority
2024	Rose Buscholl	0 / 61	Steady	5th	4,397	1.0%	No seats	Sask Party majority

== Party leaders ==
† Denotes vacancy or acting/interim leader

#	Party Leader	Highest Position	Tenure	Notes
1	Frederick Haultain	Leader of the Opposition	1905 – 1912	Premier of the Northwest Territories, 1897–1905; appointed a Chief Justice in 1912
2	Wellington Bartley Willoughby	Leader of the Opposition	1912 – 1917	
3	Donald Maclean	Leader of the Opposition	1917 – 1921	
4	John Salkeld	Party leader	1921 – 1924	
5	James T. M. Anderson	Premier	1924 – October 28, 1936	First Conservative Premier in provincial history; led a coalition government
6	John Diefenbaker	Party leader	October 28, 1936 – 1940	Elected as federal MP for Lake Centre on March 26, 1940; became federal PC leader in 1956
†	Vacant	—	1940 – 1942	
7	Herbert E. Keown	Party leader	June 18, 1942 – February 15, 1944	
8	Rupert Ramsay	Party leader	February 15, 1944 – October 12, 1949	
9	Alvin Hamilton	Party leader	October 12, 1949 – June 10, 1957	
†	Vacant	—	1957 – 1958	
10	Martin Pederson	Party leader	October 28, 1958 – 1968	Only PC candidate to be elected in a general election between 1934 and 1975
†	Vacant	—	1968 – 1970	
11	Ed Nasserden	Party leader	February 28, 1970 – 1972	
†	Vacant	—	1972 – 1973	
12	Dick Collver	Leader of the Opposition	March 18, 1973 – November 9, 1979	Resigned in 1979 and in 1980 founded the separatist Unionest Party
13	Grant Devine	Premier	November 9, 1979 – October 8, 1992	First and to date the only Conservative Premier to win re-election
†	Rick Swenson	Leader of the Opposition	October 8, 1992 – November 21, 1994	
14	Bill Boyd	Leader of the Opposition	November 21, 1994 – August 8, 1997	Resigned in 1997 and became a founding member of the conservative Saskatchewan Party
†	Iris Dennis	Party leader	August 8, 1997 – May 31, 2006	
15	Rick Swenson	Party leader	May 31, 2006 – November 3, 2018	
16	Ken Grey	Party leader	November 3, 2018 – January 18, 2021	
†	Vacant	—	2021 – 2022	
17	Rose Buscholl	Party leader	November 16, 2022 – present	Served as interim leader from 2022 to 2023

== See also ==
- Politics of Saskatchewan
- Progressive Conservative Party of Saskatchewan leadership conventions.
- Northwest Territories Liberal-Conservative Party
