= 2009 Saskatchewan New Democratic Party leadership election =

- June 5–7, 2009
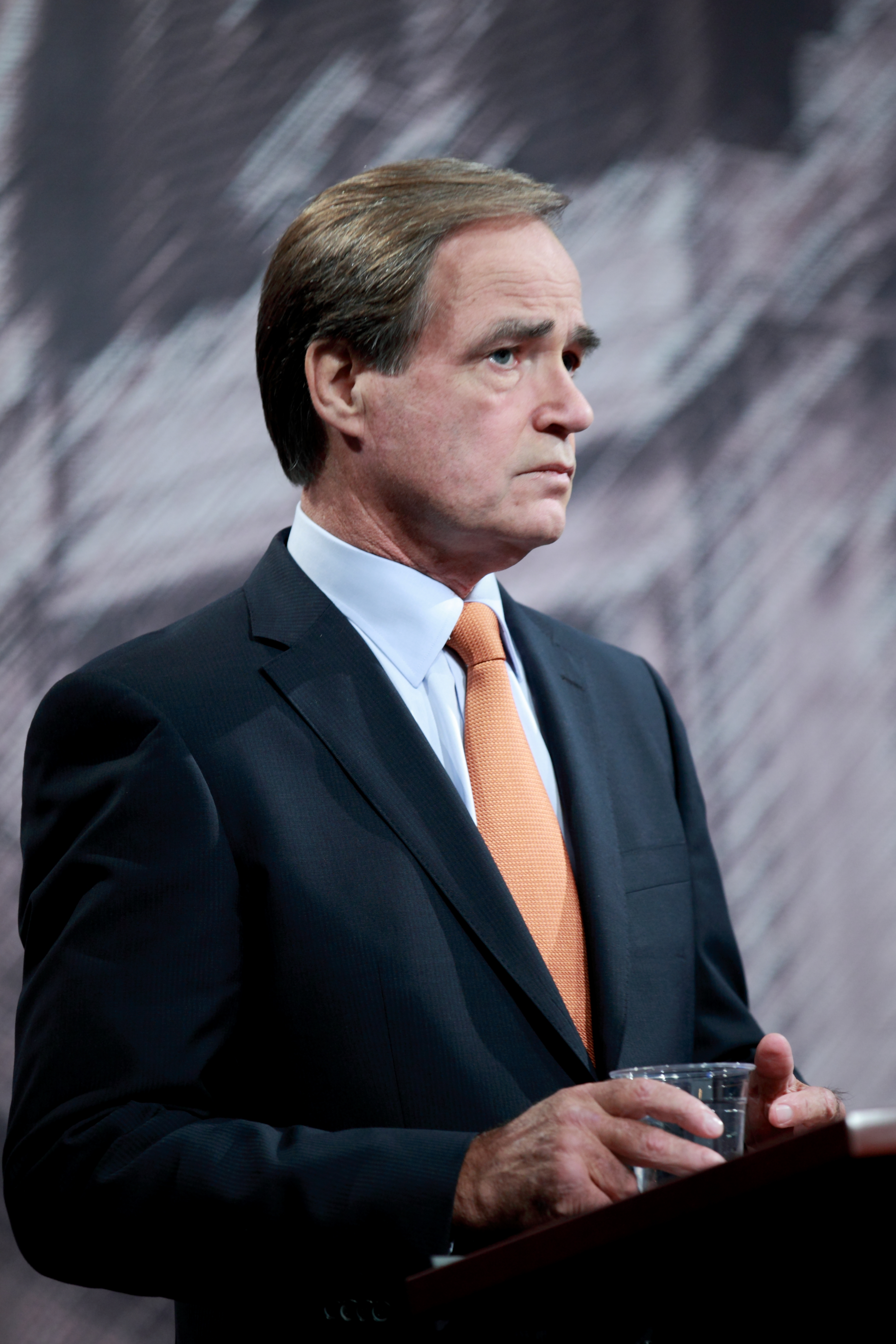

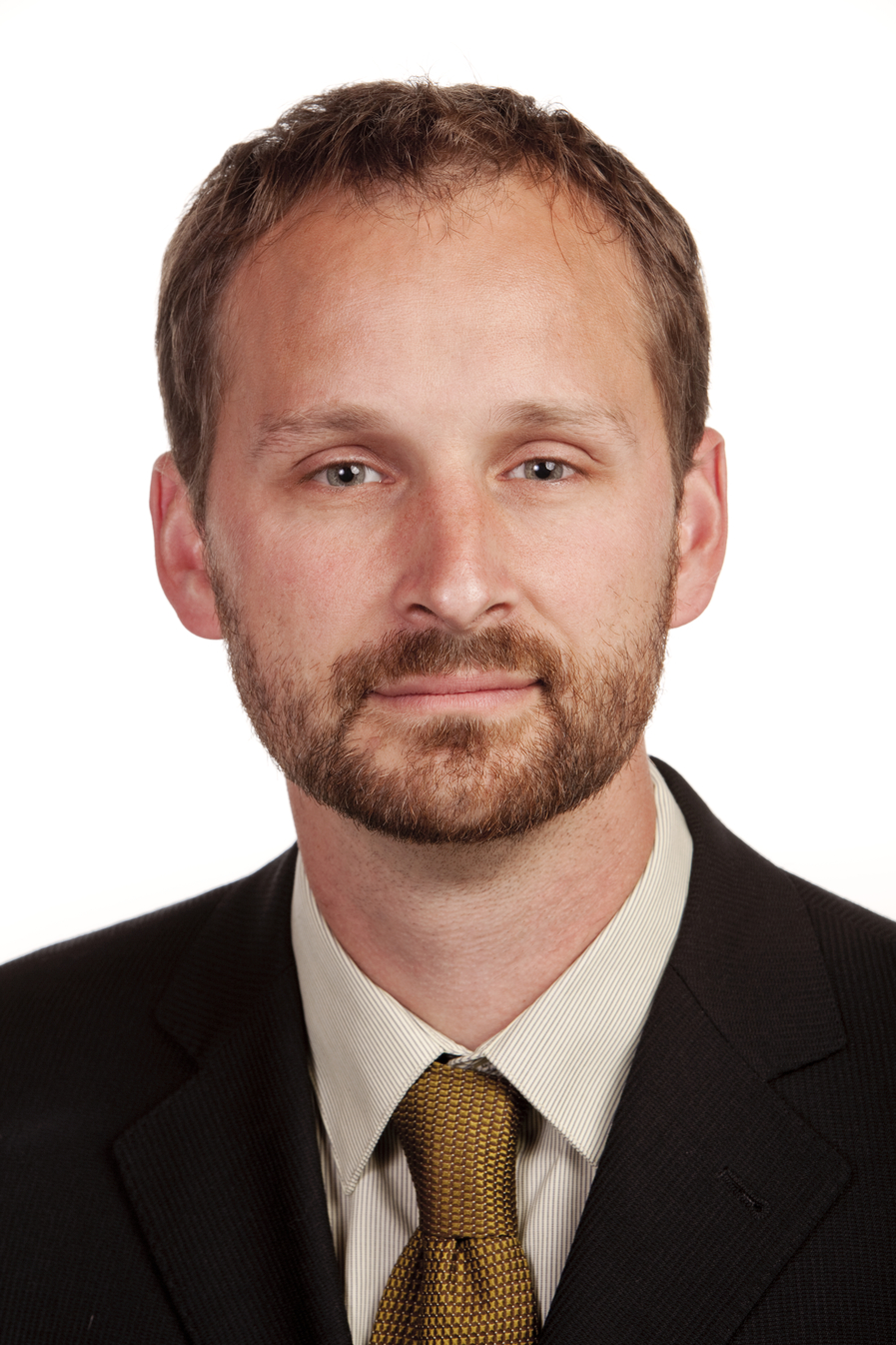
Candidate	Dwain Lingenfelter	Ryan Meili
Riding	none (Note: Previously a member of the Legislative Assembly for Regina Elphinstone from 1988 to 2000. Won a by-election in Regina Douglas Park after the leadership election in September 2009)	none (Note: Later elected to the Legislative Assembly for Saskatoon Meewasin in a by-election in March 2017)
Final ballot	5,028 (55.07%)	4,102 (44.93%)
First ballot	4,360 (46.17%)	2,401 (25.42%)
Leader before election
Lorne Calvert
Elected Leader
Dwain Lingenfelter

2009 Saskatchewan New Democratic Party leadership election
- Date: June 5–7, 2009
- Convention: Ipsco Place, Regina
- Resigning leader: Lorne Calvert
- Won by: Dwain Lingenfelter
- Ballots: 2
- Candidates: 4
- Spending limit: $200,000

The 2009 Saskatchewan New Democratic Party leadership election was held on June 5–7, 2009, to elect a successor to Lorne Calvert as leader of the Saskatchewan New Democratic Party. The election was necessary because Calvert had announced his intention to step down as leader on October 16, 2008. Dwain Lingenfelter won on the second ballot, defeating Ryan Meili.

== Background ==
Dwain Lingenfelter was widely perceived to be the frontrunner during the leadership campaign, and attracted the most fundraising.

Following the first ballot, Yens Pedersen withdrew and Deb Higgins was eliminated. Both chose to endorse Meili.

== Candidates ==
=== Deb Higgins ===
Deb Higgins was the MLA for Moose Jaw Wakamow. She was first elected in the 1999 provincial election. Before entering politics, she was a union organizer for United Food and Commercial Workers.

=== Dwain Lingenfelter ===
Dwain Lingenfelter was previously the MLA for Regina Elphinstone from 1988 to 2000 and Shaunavon from 1978 to 1986. He had also served as Deputy Premier under Roy Romanow. Before entering politics, he was a farmer.

=== Ryan Meili ===
Ryan Meili was a physician from Saskatoon.

=== Yens Pedersen ===
Yens Pedersen was a lawyer from Regina and the former president of the Saskatchewan New Democratic Party. He was also the Saskatchewan NDP candidate for the constituency of Regina South in the 2007 and 2011 provincial elections.

== Ballot results ==
First Ballot
Candidate	Votes	Percentage
Dwain Lingenfelter	4,360	46.17
Ryan Meili	2,401	25.42
Yens Pedersen	1,380	14.61
Deb Higgins	1,303	13.80
Total	9,444	100.00

Second Ballot
Candidate	Weighted Votes	Percentage	+/-
Dwain Lingenfelter	5,028	55.07	+8.90
Ryan Meili	4,102	44.93	+19.51
Total	9,130	100.00	
