= Moose Jaw station =

Moose Jaw station may refer to:

- Moose Jaw station (Canadian National Railway)
- Moose Jaw station (Canadian Pacific Railway)

== See also ==
- Moose Jaw
