= List of historic places in Moose Jaw =

This article is a list of historic places in Moose Jaw, Saskatchewan entered on the Canadian Register of Historic Places, whether they are federal, provincial, or municipal.

== List of historic places ==
Name	Address	Coordinates	Government recognition (CRHP №)	Wikidata ID	Image
Canadian National Railway Station	341 Stadacona Street E Moose Jaw SK	50°23′40″N 105°31′34″W	Federal (6758), Moose Jaw municipality (1526)	Q6908590	More images
Canadian Pacific Railway Station	3 Manitoba Street W Moose Jaw SK	50°23′23″N 105°32′06″W	Federal (6639), Moose Jaw municipality (7778)	Q6908589	More images
Eaton's Store	500 Main Street N Moose Jaw SK	50°23′41″N 105°32′06″W	Moose Jaw municipality (1669)		Upload Photo
Former Capitol 3 Theatre	217 Main Street N Moose Jaw SK	50°23′32″N 105°32′04″W	Moose Jaw municipality (6462)		
Gert Elders Interiors & Home Furnishings (Old Masonic Temple)	23 Main Street N Moose Jaw SK	50°23′24″N 105°32′02″W	Moose Jaw municipality (1985)		Upload Photo
Land Titles Building	76 Fairford Street W Moose Jaw SK	50°23′33″N 105°32′13″W	Moose Jaw municipality (2189)	Q6483986	More images
Moose Jaw Fire Hall	136-138 Fairford Street W Moose Jaw SK	50°23′34″N 105°32′17″W	Moose Jaw municipality (2673)		
Moose Jaw Court House	64 Ominica Street West; Moose Jaw SK	50°23′44″N 105°32′13″W	Federal (13178), Saskatchewan (3098)	Q6908596	Upload Photo
Public Comfort Station	Crescent Park; Moose Jaw SK	50°23′37″N 105°31′52″W	Moose Jaw municipality (3384)		Upload Photo
Hopkins Dining Parlour	65 Athabasca Street W Moose Jaw SK	50°23′24″N 105°32′17″W	Moose Jaw municipality (3385)		Upload Photo
Jitney Dance Hall	Connor's Park; Moose Jaw SK	50°22′08″N 105°33′11″W	Moose Jaw municipality (3386)		Upload Photo
St. John's Anglican Church	124 1st Avenue NE; Moose Jaw SK	50°23′29″N 105°31′55″W	Moose Jaw municipality (3387)		Upload Photo
Walter Scott Building	12 High Street East; Moose Jaw SK	50°23′30″N 105°32′02″W	Moose Jaw municipality (5014)		
Moose Jaw Cemetery	1000 Block Caribou Street East; Moose Jaw SK	50°23′47″N 105°30′29″W	Moose Jaw municipality (6399)		Upload Photo
Moose Jaw Public Library	461 Langdon Crescent; Moose Jaw SK	50°23′41″N 105°31′55″W	Moose Jaw municipality (6400)	Q117074472	More images
72 High Street East	72 High Street East; Moose Jaw SK	50°23′30″N 105°31′55″W	Moose Jaw municipality (6401)		Upload Photo
Former Army & Navy Store	229 Main Street North; Moose Jaw SK	50°23′32″N 105°32′06″W	Moose Jaw municipality (6461)		Upload Photo
St. Mark's Presbyterian Church	80 High Street East; Moose Jaw SK	50°23′30″N 105°31′55″W	Moose Jaw municipality (6463)		Upload Photo
Elk (Sun) Block	16-18 Main Street North; Moose Jaw SK	50°23′24″N 105°32′06″W	Moose Jaw municipality (6465)		Upload Photo
Chinese United Church	303 High Street W Moose Jaw SK	50°23′29″N 105°32′31″W	Moose Jaw municipality (7057)		More images
Moose Jaw City Hall	228 Main Street N Moose Jaw SK	50°23′26″N 105°32′02″W	Moose Jaw municipality (7068)	Q6908592	More images
Latimer Residence on Oxford Street	37 Oxford Street W Moose Jaw SK	50°23′56″N 105°32′10″W	Moose Jaw municipality (7072)		Upload Photo
D.V. Currie VC Armoury	1215 Main Street North; Moose Jaw SK	50°24′13″N 105°31′59″W	Federal (11051)		Upload Photo
Zion United Church	423 Main Street N Moose Jaw SK	50°23′40″N 105°32′05″W	Moose Jaw municipality (7071)		Upload Photo

== See also ==
- List of National Historic Sites of Canada in Saskatchewan
