= Buffalo Pound Lake =

Lake in Saskatchewan, Canada

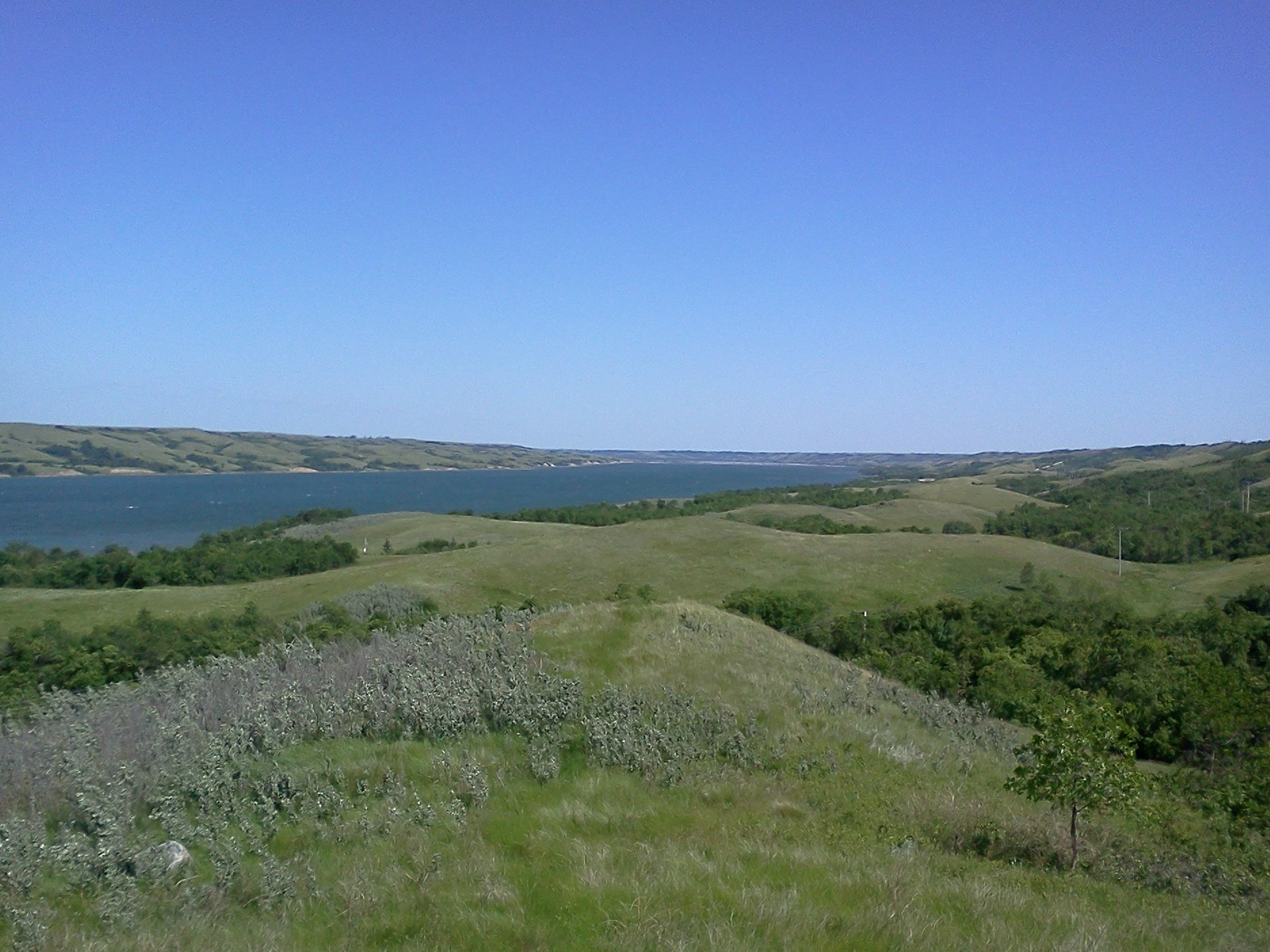
- Buffalo Pound Lake

- Location in Saskatchewan Buffalo Pound Lake (Canada)
- Location: Saskatchewan
- Coordinates: 50°39′00″N 105°30′50″W
- Lake type: Prairie lake
- Part of: Red River drainage basin
- Primary inflows: Qu'Appelle River
- Primary outflows: Qu'Appelle River
- Catchment area: 3,310 km^{2} (1,280 sq mi)
- Basin countries: Canada
- Managing agency: Saskatchewan Water Security Agency
- First flooded: 1939
- Max. length: 35 km (22 mi)
- Max. width: 2 km (1.2 mi)
- Surface area: 29.5 km^{2} (11.4 sq mi)
- Average depth: 3 m (9.8 ft)
- Max. depth: 5.6 m (18 ft)
- Water volume: 91,987 dam^{3} (74,575 acre⋅ft)
- Residence time: 1.5 years
- Shore length^{1}: 72.5 km (45.0 mi)
- Surface elevation: 509.47 m (1,671.5 ft)
- ^{1} Shore length is not a well-defined measure.

Buffalo Pound Lake is a eutrophic prairie lake formed from glacial melt about 10,000 years ago on the Qu'Appelle River in Saskatchewan, Canada. It is located approximately 28 kilometres (17 mi) north of Moose Jaw and 11 kilometres (6.8 mi) north-east of Tuxford. The lake gets its name from the method used by First Nations people to capture the bison using the natural topography as corrals or buffalo pounds. Bison, once numbering more than 60 million on the prairies but almost extinct by 1900, were reintroduced into the area in 1972.

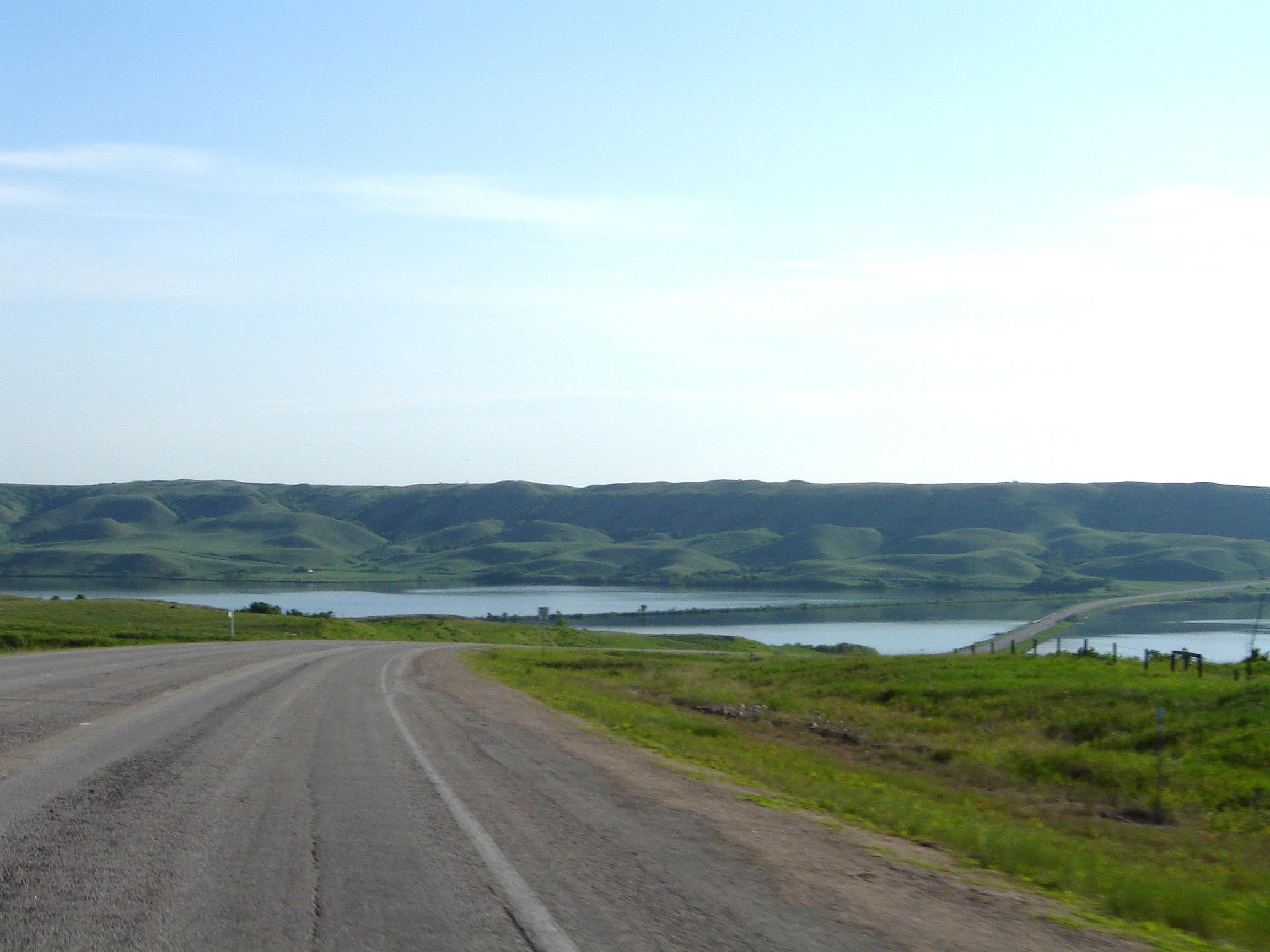
Highway 2 crossing Buffalo Pound Lake

The lake provides drinking water for the cities of Regina, Moose Jaw, and the Mosaic Company potash mine at Belle Plaine, approximately 25% of the province's population. It is also used for recreational purposes such as camping, boating, and fishing and is home to a host of fish species including walleye, sauger, yellow perch, northern pike, cisco, mooneye, lake whitefish, white sucker, channel catfish, burbot, bigmouth buffalo, and common carp. Buffalo Pound Provincial Park is located on the southern part of the lake and can be accessed by Highway 202 and Highway 301. Log cabins can be rented or bought along the shores of the lake.

Highway 2 crosses by causeway on the lake.

The Moose Jaw River joins the Qu'Appelle River 5 kilometres (3.1 mi) east of the dam in the Nicolle Flats Marsh.

== Buffalo Pound Dam ==
The Qu'Appelle River was dammed by the Prairie Farm Rehabilitation Administration (PFRA) in 1939 to control fluctuating water levels. The dam is an embankment dam approximately 1,400 metres (4,600 ft) long. As constructed in 1939, the dam maintained the full water supply level at 508.0 metres (1,666.7 ft). The current dam has a full supply level of 509.47 metres (1,671.5 ft).

A fish ladder installed in 1999–2000 allows fish to migrate in and out of the lake and new gates were installed to create a better water supply downstream. The height of the dam was also raised one metre. The problem with fluctuating water levels wasn't solved all together until the construction of the Qu'Appelle River Dam and Gardiner Dam that created Lake Diefenbaker 100 kilometres (62 mi) upstream in 1967. As a result, water flow in the Qu'Appelle River now remains relatively constant. This, however, has flushed the lake out and allowed excessive algae growth, which reduced the popularity of swimming and boating during the summer months and raised the cost of water treatment. The lake remains eutrophic, due to low oxygen levels and highly nutritious soil on the lake's bottom.

The Buffalo Pound Water Treatment Plant is next to Buffalo Pound Provincial Park. First contemplated in the 1940s, construction of the plant to supplier water to Regina and Moose Jaw was undertaken in 1951, and has been expanded several times since.

== NCC's Buffalo Pound ==
Buffalo Pound is a Nature Conservancy of Canada (NCC) property located on the northern shore of Buffalo Pound Lake. In 2020, the NCC bought the land for $3.38-million. About 30%, or $987,000, was contributed by K+S Potash Canada offset grassland destroyed in Saskatchewan by mine construction. The rest of the money came from the Canadian and Saskatchewan governments and hundreds of private donors. The land was purchased from local cattle ranchers and cattle will continue to graze the land.

The total land area of the park is 866 ha (2,140 acres) with 7 kilometres (4.3 mi) of shoreline along the lake. It consists mostly of native grasslands and provides habitat to a variety of wildlife, including animals on Canada's Species at Risk Act, such as the American badger, Baird’s sparrow, bobolink, northern leopard frog, and Sprague’s pipit.

== Buffalo Pound Lake Research Observatory ==
Researchers have been monitoring conditions at Buffalo Pound Lake for more than 20 years. Since 2017, the Global Water Futures Program has studied the lake and the Qu'Appelle Watershed, modelling environmental changes that could affect the supply of clean drinking water. The site is now part of the Global Water Futures Observatories network.

== See also ==
- Saskatchewan Water Security Agency
- Dams and reservoirs in Saskatchewan
- List of lakes of Saskatchewan
- List of protected areas of Saskatchewan
