= Bud Smith (Saskatchewan politician) =

Member of the Saskatchewan Legislative Assembly for Moose Jaw South
- In office April 26, 1982 – October 20, 1986
- Preceded by: Gordon Snyder
- Succeeded by: Lorne Calvert

Personal details
- Born: Arthur Leslie Smith; June 14, 1919 Cardross, Saskatchewan, Canada
- Died: November 11, 2002 (aged 83) Moose Jaw, Saskatchewan, Canada
- Party: Progressive Conservative
- Spouse(s): Irene (died 1966) Goldie Best (m. 1967; died 1985) Mary Rohrich (m. 1988)
- Profession: Farmer and carpenter
- Portfolio: Deputy Government Whip

Arthur Leslie "Bud" Smith (June 14, 1919 – November 11, 2002) was a Canadian politician in the province of Saskatchewan. He was elected to the Legislative Assembly of Saskatchewan for the constituency of Moose Jaw South in the 1982 general election, which resulted in a Progressive Conservative government under Premier Grant Devine.

== Personal life ==
Born in Cardross, Saskatchewan, Smith farmed in the Cardross area for thirty-two years. He then worked as a carpenter, primarily in Moose Jaw. He was married three times, being predeceased by his first two wives.

== Political career ==
Smith was long active in the Progressive Conservative Party of Saskatchewan. He stood for election four times, in the general elections of 1975, 1978, 1982 and 1986. He was defeated in the 1975 and 1978 elections, but elected in the Progressive Conservative landslide of 1982. He was defeated by Lorne Calvert of the New Democratic Party in the 1986 election and retired from provincial politics.

During his term, he was considered a good constituency representative, to the point that Calvert, who defeated him in the 1986 election, was not sure if Calvert's own mother voted for Smith or for him. Smith's policy interests were improvements in health and social services. He was the Deputy Government Whip.

== Electoral history ==
Smith stood for election four times in the riding of Moose Jaw South. He was defeated in 1975 and 1978, but elected in 1982. He served one term, being defeated in 1986.

=== 1975 Provincial election: Moose Jaw South ===
General Election, June 11, 1975: Moose Jaw South
| Party | Candidate | Popular Vote | % |
|---|---|---|---|
| New Democratic Party | Yes X Gordon Snyder | 3,950 | 53.9% |
| Progressive Conservative | Arthur Leslie "Bud" Smith | 1,857 | 25.3% |
| Liberal | Faye Gordon | 1,521 | 20.8% |
| Total | | 7,328 | 100.0% |
Source: Saskatchewan Archives - Election Results by Electoral Division - Moose Jaw South

Yes Elected.
X Incumbent.

=== 1978 Provincial election: Moose Jaw South ===
General Election, October 18, 1978: Moose Jaw South
| Party | Candidate | Popular Vote | % |
|---|---|---|---|
| New Democratic Party | Yes X Gordon Snyder | 4,512 | 59.1% |
| Progressive Conservative | Arthur Leslie "Bud" Smith | 2,408 | 31.5% |
| Liberal | Terry W. Ocrane | 716 | 9.4% |
| Total | | 7,636 | 100.0% |
Source: Saskatchewan Archives - Election Results by Electoral Division - Moose Jaw South

Yes Elected.
X Incumbent.

=== 1982 Provincial election: Moose Jaw South ===
General Election, April 26, 1982: Moose Jaw South
| Party | Candidate | Popular Vote | % |
|---|---|---|---|
| Progressive Conservative | Yes Arthur Leslie "Bud" Smith | 4,110 | 47.7% |
| New Democratic Party | X Gordon Snyder | 3,908 | 45.3% |
| Liberal | Bob Halter | 328 | 3.8% |
| Western Canada Concept | J.R. (Jack) Ashton | 275 | 3.2% |
| Total | | 8,621 | 100.0% |
Source: Saskatchewan Archives - Election Results by Electoral Division - Moose Jaw South

Yes Elected.
X Incumbent.

=== 1986 Provincial election: Moose Jaw South ===
General Election, October 20, 1986: Moose Jaw South
| Party | Candidate | Popular Vote | % |
|---|---|---|---|
| New Democratic Party | Yes Lorne Calvert | 4,959 | 58.5% |
| Progressive Conservative | X Arthur Leslie "Bud" Smith | 2,823 | 33.3% |
| Liberal | Irene McKenzie | 653 | 7.7% |
| Western Canada Concept | Phoebe Dowhy | 49 | 0.6% |
| Total | | 8,484 | 100.1%^{1} |
Source: Saskatchewan Archives - Election Results by Electoral Division - Moose Jaw South

Yes Elected.
X Incumbent.
^{1} Rounding error.
