= Moose Jaw Municipal Airport =

Airport in Saskatchewan, Canada

- IATA: none; ICAO: none; TC LID: CJS4

Summary
- Airport type: Public
- Owner: Moose Jaw Municipal Airport Authority Inc.
- Operator: Provincial Airways or Moose Jaw Municipal Airport Authority Inc.
- Location: RM of Moose Jaw No. 161, near Moose Jaw, Saskatchewan
- Time zone: CST (UTC−06:00)
- Elevation AMSL: 1,904 ft / 580 m
- Coordinates: 50°26′01″N 105°23′10″W

Map
- Location in Saskatchewan CJS4 (Canada)

Runways
Direction	Length		Surface
Direction	ft	m	Surface
13/31	4,000	1,219	Asphalt
- Source: Canada Flight Supplement

Moose Jaw Municipal Airport (TC LID: CJS4) is a general aviation facility located 7 nautical miles (13 km; 8.1 mi) east north-east of Moose Jaw, Saskatchewan, Canada.

It has a single paved runway and series of hangars and support structures.

== Ground transportation ==
The airport is connected with Moose Jaw by Highway 301 (connecting with the Trans-Canada Highway — Saskatchewan Highway of Heroes) to the west side of the airport. A dirt drive leads out to the road. Cars can park along the grass / dirt next to the tarmac.

== Tenants ==
- Skydive South Sask - a Regina-based skydiving school which uses the airport as drop zone
- Moose Jaw Flying Club
- Provincial Airways - fixed-base operator

== History ==
During the Second World War the Royal Canadian Air Force used this site as the secondary relief landing field (R2) for No. 32 Service Flying Training School located at RCAF Station Moose Jaw. The facility was named "RCAF Aerodrome Burdick, Saskatchewan".

== See also ==
- List of airports in Saskatchewan
- Moose Jaw/Air Vice Marshal C.M. McEwen Airport - larger military airport located south of Moose Jaw
- Moose Jaw (Dr. F. H. Wigmore Regional Hospital) Heliport
- Regina International Airport - closest public civil airport
