= Moose Jaw Wakamow =

Provincial electoral district in Saskatchewan, Canada

Saskatchewan electoral district
- Coordinates: 50.385°N 105.546°W

Provincial electoral district
- Legislature: Legislative Assembly of Saskatchewan
MLA
Megan Patterson
Saskatchewan
- First contested: 1967 as "Moose Jaw South"
- Last contested: 2024

Demographics
- Electors: 9,599
- Census division: Division No. 7
- Census subdivision(s): Moose Jaw, Moose Jaw No. 161

Moose Jaw Wakamow is a provincial electoral district for the Legislative Assembly of Saskatchewan, Canada. One of two provincial constituencies for the city of Moose Jaw, the riding contains the area of the city south of Caribou Street, northeast of 9th Avenue, and northwest of Thatcher Drive.

== History ==
This district (along with its counterpart Moose Jaw North) was created for the 1967 election after the Saskatchewan government decided to retire a system of multiple-MLA electoral divisions for the cities of Regina, Saskatoon, and Moose Jaw. The riding was called Moose Jaw South prior to the 1991 general election, when it adopted its current name.

From the 2003 election through the 2011 election, the riding contained a sizable rural area to the south of Moose Jaw including the Rural Municipality of Baildon and the northern half of the Rural Municipality of Terrell. This rural territory was moved to Lumsden-Morse for the 2016 election, making Moose Jaw Wakamow back into a strictly urban riding.

For the 2024 general election, the riding gained the part of the Rural Municipality of Moose Jaw south of the Trans-Canada Highway, including CFB Moose Jaw.

== Members of the Legislative Assembly ==
Legislature	Years	Member	Party
Moose Jaw South
16th	1967–1971	William Davies	New Democrat
17th	1971–1975	Gordon Snyder	New Democrat
18th	1975–1978	Gordon Snyder	New Democrat
19th	1978–1982	Gordon Snyder	New Democrat
20th	1982–1986	Arthur Leslie "Bud" Smith	Progressive Conservative
21st	1986–1991	Lorne Calvert	New Democrat
Moose Jaw Wakamow
22nd	1991–1995	Lorne Calvert	New Democrat
23rd	1995–1999	Lorne Calvert	New Democrat
24th	1999–2003	Deb Higgins	New Democrat
25th	2003–2007	Deb Higgins	New Democrat
26th	2007–2011	Deb Higgins	New Democrat
27th	2011–2016	Greg Lawrence	Saskatchewan Party
28th	2016–2020	Greg Lawrence	Saskatchewan Party
29th	2020–2024	Greg Lawrence	Saskatchewan Party
29th	2024	Greg Lawrence	Independent
30th	2024-present	Megan Patterson	Saskatchewan Party

== Election results ==
2024 Saskatchewan general election
Party	Candidate	Votes	%	±%
Saskatchewan	Megan Patterson	3,819	55.02	+0.92
New Democratic	Melissa Patterson	2,894	41.69	+1.69
Green	Michael Gardiner	228	3.28	+1.08
Total valid votes		6,941	99.40	
Total rejected ballots		42	0.60	-0.10
Turnout		6,983	52.71	–
Eligible voters		13,249		
Saskatchewan hold		Swing		–
Source: Elections Saskatchewan

2020 provincial election redistributed results
Party	%
Saskatchewan	54.1
New Democratic	40.0
Green	2.2
Buffalo	0.1

2020 Saskatchewan general election
Party	Candidate	Votes	%	±%
Saskatchewan	Greg Lawrence	3,466	53.40	+0.33
New Democratic	Melissa Patterson	2,644	40.73	-1.84
Progressive Conservative	Darcy Jensen	239	3.68	-
Green	Abby Firlotte	142	2.19	+0.59
Total valid votes		6,491	99.30	
Total rejected ballots		46	0.70	–
Turnout		6,537	–	–
Eligible voters		–		
Saskatchewan hold		Swing		–
Source: Elections Saskatchewan

2016 Saskatchewan general election
Party	Candidate	Votes	%	±%
Saskatchewan	Greg Lawrence	3,514	53.07	+3.97
New Democratic	Karen Purdy	2,819	42.57	-3.31
Liberal	Terry Gabel	182	2.74	-
Green	Shaun Francis Drake	106	1.60	-0.07
Total valid votes		6,621	100.0	
Eligible voters		–		
Source: Elections Saskatchewan

2011 Saskatchewan general election
Party	Candidate	Votes	%	±%
Saskatchewan	Greg Lawrence	3,064	49.10	+12.40
New Democratic	Deb Higgins	2,863	45.88	-6.45
Progressive Conservative	Tom Steen	209	3.35	+0.51
Green	Deanna Robilliard	104	1.67	-0.59
Total		6,240	100.00	

2007 Saskatchewan general election
Party	Candidate	Votes	%	±%
New Democratic	Deb Higgins	3,887	52.33	-10.27
Saskatchewan	Gwen Beitel	2,726	36.70	+6.37
Liberal	Sharice Billett Niedermayer	436	5.87	-0.24
Progressive Conservative	Tom Steen	211	2.84	-
Green	Larissa Shasko	168	2.26	+1.30
Total		7,428	100.00	

2003 Saskatchewan general election
Party	Candidate	Votes	%	±%
New Democratic	Deb Higgins	4,394	62.60	+8.68
Saskatchewan	Gwen Beitel	2,129	30.33	-2.46
Liberal	Robert Cosman	429	6.11	-5.46
New Green	Marcela Gall	67	0.96	*
Total		7,019	100.00	

1999 Saskatchewan general election
Party	Candidate	Votes	%	±%
New Democratic	Deb Higgins	3,111	53.92	-9.03
Saskatchewan	Doris Dunphy	1,892	32.79	*
Liberal	Marlin Belt	668	11.57	-14.54
Progressive Conservative	Vanessa Slater	99	1.72	-9.22
Total		5,770	100.00	

1995 Saskatchewan general election
Party	Candidate	Votes	%	±%
New Democratic	Lorne Calvert	3,803	62.95	-4.29
Liberal	Jim Carr	1,577	26.11	+6.22
Progressive Conservative	Norma Donovan	661	10.94	-1.93
Total		6,041	100.00	

1991 Saskatchewan general election
Party	Candidate	Votes	%	±%
New Democratic	Lorne Calvert	6,083	67.24	+8.79
Liberal	Randy Roman	1,799	19.89	+12.19
Progressive Conservative	Lisa Acton	1,164	12.87	-20.40
Total		9,046	100.00	

=== Moose Jaw South (1967 – 1991) ===
1986 Saskatchewan general election: Moose Jaw South
Party	Candidate	Votes	%	±%
New Democratic	Lorne Calvert	4,959	58.45	+13.12
Progressive Conservative	Arthur Leslie "Bud" Smith	2,823	33.27	-14.40
Liberal	Irene McKenzie	653	7.70	+3.89
Western Canada Concept	Phoebe Dowhy	49	0.58	-2.61
Total		8,484	100.00	

1982 Saskatchewan general election: Moose Jaw South
Party	Candidate	Votes	%	±%
Progressive Conservative	Arthur Leslie "Bud" Smith	4,110	47.67	+16.14
New Democratic	Gordon Snyder	3,908	45.33	-13.76
Liberal	Bob Halter	328	3.81	-5.57
Western Canada Concept	Jack Ashton	275	3.19	*
Total		8,621	100.00	

1978 Saskatchewan general election: Moose Jaw South
Party	Candidate	Votes	%	±%
New Democratic	Gordon Snyder	4,512	59.09	+5.19
Progressive Conservative	Arthur Leslie "Bud" Smith	2,408	31.53	+6.19
Liberal	Terry W. Ocrane	716	9.38	-11.38
Total		7,636	100.00	

1975 Saskatchewan general election: Moose Jaw South
Party	Candidate	Votes	%	±%
New Democratic	Gordon Snyder	3,950	53.90	-9.74
Progressive Conservative	Arthur Leslie "Bud" Smith	1,857	25.34	-
Liberal	Faye Gordon	1,521	20.76	-15.60
Total		7,328	100.00	

1971 Saskatchewan general election: Moose Jaw South
Party	Candidate	Votes	%	±%
New Democratic	Gordon Snyder	6,461	63.64	+8.30
Liberal	Herbert E. Taylor	3,691	36.36	+7.76
Total		10,152	100.00	

1967 Saskatchewan general election: Moose Jaw South
Party	Candidate	Votes	%	±%
New Democratic	William Davies	4,674	55.34	*
Liberal	Harry P. Swarbrick	2,415	28.60	*
Progressive Conservative	Nick Markewich	1,356	16.06	*
Total		8,445	100.00	

== See also ==
- List of Saskatchewan provincial electoral districts
- List of Saskatchewan general elections
- Canadian provincial electoral districts
