= Saskatchewan Highway 202 =

Provincial highway in Saskatchewan, Canada

Highway 202

Route information
- Maintained by Ministry of Highways and Infrastructure
- Length: 12.5 km (7.8 mi)

Major junctions
- West end: Highway 2 near Tuxford
- Highway 301 near Buffalo Pound Provincial Park
- East end: Buffalo Pound Provincial Park

Location
- Country: Canada
- Province: Saskatchewan
- Rural municipalities: Moose Jaw, Marquis

Highway system
- Provincial highways in Saskatchewan
← Highway 201	→ Highway 204

Highway 202 is a provincial highway in the Canadian province of Saskatchewan. The highway runs from Highway 2 south of Tuxford to just past the entry gates at Buffalo Pound Provincial Park. Near the entrance to the park, it is met by Highway 301. Highway 202 is about 12.5 kilometres (7.8 mi) long.

== Route description ==
Hwy 202 begins in the Rural Municipality of Moose Jaw No. 161 at an intersection with Hwy 2 (Veterans Memorial Highway) just south of the village of Tuxford, heading north for a couple kilometres to make a right at a Y-Intersection with Township Road 190 to head east along the boundary with the Rural Municipality of Marquis No. 191. It has an intersection with Range Road 2260, which provides access to Parkview, before curving back northward into Marquis No. 191 at a junction with Hwy 301, travelling through the main gate to enter Buffalo Pound Provincial Park (where it has an extremely wide median) at the edge of the Qu'Appelle River valley, with Hwy 202 coming to an end while the roadway continues as the main thoroughfare into the park. The entire length of Hwy 202 is a paved, two-lane highway.

== Major intersections ==
From west to east:

Rural municipality	Location	km	mi	Destinations	Notes
Moose Jaw No. 161		0.0	0.0	Highway 2 (Vetterans Memorial Highway) – Moose Jaw, Tuxford	Western terminus
Moose Jaw No. 161 / Marquis No. 191 boundary		2.9– 3.4	1.8– 2.1	Township Road 190 – Tuxford	
Moose Jaw No. 161 / Marquis No. 191 boundary		7.6	4.7	Range Road 2260 – Parkview	
Marquis No. 191		10.8	6.7	Highway 301 south to Highway 1 (TCH) – Nicolle Homestead, Regina	Northern terminus of Hwy 301
Marquis No. 191	Buffalo Pound Provincial Park	12.5	7.8	Buffalo Pound Provincial Park main gate	Eastern terminus; road continues north into the park
1.000 mi = 1.609 km; 1.000 km = 0.621 mi

== See also ==
- Transportation in Saskatchewan
- Roads in Saskatchewan
