= Saskatchewan Highway 301 =

Provincial highway in Saskatchewan, Canada

Highway 301

Route information
- Maintained by Ministry of Highways and Infrastructure
- Length: 21.3 km (13.2 mi)

Major junctions
- South end: Highway 1 (TCH) / Highway 39 near Moose Jaw
- North end: Highway 202 near Buffalo Pound Provincial Park

Location
- Country: Canada
- Province: Saskatchewan
- Rural municipalities: Moose Jaw, Marquis

Highway system
- Provincial highways in Saskatchewan
← Highway 271	→ Highway 302

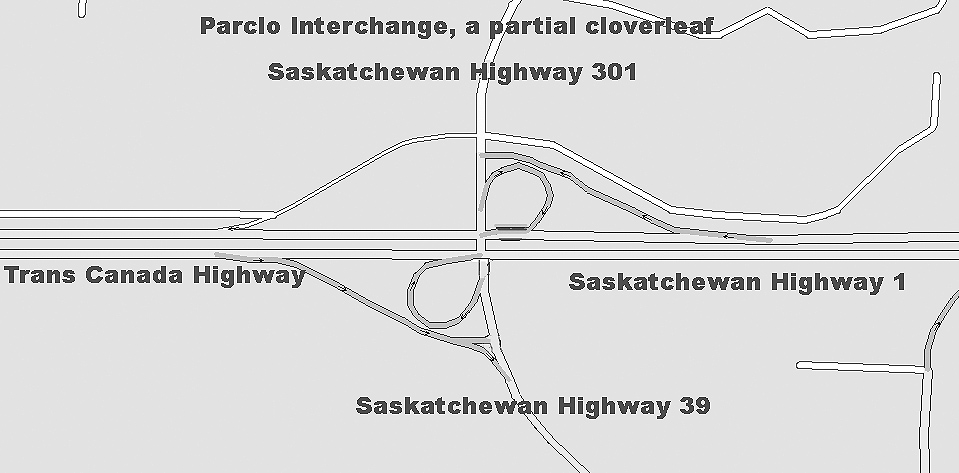
Parclo or partial cloverleaf interchange at Sk Hwy 1, the Trans-Canada Highway (east west), Sk Hwy 39, part of the CanAm route (south) and Sk Hwy 301 (north)

Highway 301 is a provincial highway in the Canadian province of Saskatchewan. It runs from the Highway 1 / Highway 39 intersection near Pasqua (east of Moose Jaw) to Highway 202 near Buffalo Pound Provincial Park and passes through the community of Mount Pleasant. It is about 21 kilometres (13 mi) long.

== Route description ==
Hwy 301 begins in the Rural Municipality of Moose Jaw No. 161 at the interchange between the Trans-Canada Highway (Hwy 1) and Hwy 39 (exit 308 on Hwy 1), located just to the north of the hamlet of Pasqua and just to the east of the city of Moose Jaw. It heads northeast to immediately cross both a bridge over the Moose Jaw River and a railway before curving northward and passing by the Moose Jaw Municipal Airport. The highway travels through rural farmland for several kilometres, passing through the hamlet of Mount Pleasant and having an intersection with Township Road 184 (provides access to the Nicolle Homestead), before curving westward as it approaches the outer rim of the Qu'Appelle River Valley, with Hwy 301 coming to an end near the southern boundary of Buffalo Pound Provincial Park at an intersection with Hwy 202. This intersection lies on the border between the RM's of Moose Jaw No. 161 and Marquis No. 191. The entire length of Hwy 301 is a paved, two-lane highway.

== Major intersections ==
Rural municipality	Location	km	mi	Destinations	Notes
Moose Jaw No. 161		0.0	0.0	Highway 1 (TCH) – Moose Jaw, Regina; Highway 39 south – Pasqua, Weyburn	Southern terminus; northern terminus of Hwy 39; Exit 308 on Hwy 1
Moose Jaw No. 161		0.4	0.25	Bridge over the Moose Jaw River	
Moose Jaw No. 161		4.4	2.7	Moose Jaw Municipal Airport	Access road
Moose Jaw No. 161		16.5	10.3	Township Road 184 – Nicolle Homestead	
Moose Jaw No. 161 / Marquis No. 191 boundary		21.3	13.2	Highway 202 – Tuxford, Buffalo Pound Provincial Park	Northern terminus
1.000 mi = 1.609 km; 1.000 km = 0.621 mi

== See also ==
- Transportation in Saskatchewan
- Roads in Saskatchewan
