= Deb Higgins =

Canadian politician

The Honourable Deb Higgins ECS

Mayor of Moose Jaw, Saskatchewan
- In office 2012–2016
- Preceded by: Glenn Hagel
- Succeeded by: Fraser Tolmie

Member of the Legislative Assembly of Saskatchewan
- In office September 16, 1999 – October 10, 2011
- Preceded by: Lorne Calvert
- Succeeded by: Greg Lawrence
- Constituency: Moose Jaw Wakamow

Personal details
- Born: 1954 (age 71–72)
- Party: New Democratic Party
- Occupation: Labour organizer

Debra Elaine Higgins is a Canadian politician. She was a member of the Legislative Assembly of Saskatchewan for the constituency of Moose Jaw Wakamow from 1999 to 2011 and served as the mayor of Moose Jaw, Saskatchewan from 2012 to 2016.

== Political career ==
Higgins got her start in politics when she became involved with the United Food and Commercial Workers union in 1982 while working at a Safeway grocery store. She later served as the President of the UFCW Manitoba Provincial Council from 1993 to 1999, during which period she also served as a table officer for the Moose Jaw & District Labour Council.

=== NDP MLA ===
Higgins was first elected to the provincial legislature as a member of the New Democratic Party in the 1999 election, and she was re-elected in the 2003 and 2007 elections. She served in the cabinet of Premier Lorne Calvert, first as the Minister of Labour and later as the Minister of Learning. After the defeat of the NDP government in the 2007 election, Higgins has served as the NDP critic for municipal affairs, liquor and gaming, and women's issues.

In 2008 Calvert retired, triggering the 2009 NDP leadership race. On January 30, 2009, Higgins announced her bid to succeed Calvert at the party's June 2009 leadership convention. Higgins ran on the theme of party renewal and poverty reduction. She was joined in the race by former Saskatchewan NDP President Yens Pedersen, former Deputy Premier Dwain Lingenfelter, and Saskatoon doctor Ryan Meili. Higgins secured 14% of votes on the first ballot and was eliminated; although both Higgins and Pedersen, who withdrew after the first ballot, endorsed Meili ahead of the second ballot, Lingenfelter was elected leader. After the race, Lingenfelter named Higgins Deputy Leader.

Higgins ran in the 2011 election, but she lost her seat to rookie Saskatchewan Party candidate Greg Lawrence in an election that saw the NDP reduced to an historic low of 9 seats in the legislature. Lingenfelter also lost his seat in the election and resigned as leader, triggering another leadership race. Higgins decided not to run again for the leadership, advocating instead for younger members to step into contention for the role. Higgins chaired the leadership election, which resulted in Cam Broten being elected.

=== Mayor of Moose Jaw ===
In September 2012, Higgins announced she would be entering municipal politics and running to become the next mayor of Moose Jaw. On October 23, 2012, Higgins was elected mayor, defeating Fraser Tolmie in a tight race and becoming the first female mayor in Moose Jaw's history.

Higgins ran for reelection in 2016. She was again running against Tolmie, along with three other candidates in a crowded field. The ballot also included a referendum on funding for replacing local water and sewer mains, which led to a high turnout. Higgins was unseated by Tolmie, who secured 53.5% of the vote.

== Electoral record ==
2016 Moose Jaw mayoral election
| Candidate | Votes | % |
|---|---|---|
| Fraser Tolmie | 5,949 | 53.5 |
| Deb Higgins | 3,469 | 31.2 |
| 3 other candidates | 1,705 | 15.3 |
| Total | 11,123 | 100.00 |

2012 Moose Jaw mayoral election
| Candidate | Votes | % |
|---|---|---|
| Deb Higgins | 5,239 | 53 |
| Fraser Tolmie | 4,645 | 47 |
| Total | 9,884 | 100.00 |

2011 Saskatchewan general election: Moose Jaw Wakamow
| Party | Candidate | Votes | % | ±% |
|---|---|---|---|---|
| Saskatchewan | Greg Lawrence | 3,064 | 49.10 | +12.40 |
| New Democratic | Deb Higgins | 2,863 | 45.88 | -6.45 |
| Progressive Conservative | Tom Steen | 209 | 3.35 | +0.51 |
| Green | Deanna Robilliard | 104 | 1.67 | -0.59 |
| Total | | 6,240 | 100.00 | |

2007 Saskatchewan general election: Moose Jaw Wakamow
| Party | Candidate | Votes | % | ±% |
|---|---|---|---|---|
| New Democratic | Deb Higgins | 3,887 | 52.33 | -10.27 |
| Saskatchewan | Gwen Beitel | 2,726 | 36.70 | +6.37 |
| Liberal | Sharice Billett Niedermayer | 436 | 5.87 | -0.24 |
| Progressive Conservative | Tom Steen | 211 | 2.84 | - |
| Green | Larissa Shasko | 168 | 2.26 | +1.30 |
| Total | | 7,428 | 100.00 | |

2003 Saskatchewan general election: Moose Jaw Wakamow
| Party | Candidate | Votes | % | ±% |
|---|---|---|---|---|
| New Democratic | Deb Higgins | 4,394 | 62.60 | +8.68 |
| Saskatchewan | Gwen Beitel | 2,129 | 30.33 | -2.46 |
| Liberal | Robert Cosman | 429 | 6.11 | -5.46 |
| New Green | Marcela Gall | 67 | 0.96 | * |
| Total | | 7,019 | 100.00 | |

1999 Saskatchewan general election: Moose Jaw Wakamow
| Party | Candidate | Votes | % | ±% |
|---|---|---|---|---|
| New Democratic | Deb Higgins | 3,111 | 53.92 | -9.03 |
| Saskatchewan | Doris Dunphy | 1,892 | 32.79 | * |
| Liberal | Marlin Belt | 668 | 11.57 | -14.54 |
| Progressive Conservative | Vanessa Slater | 99 | 1.72 | -9.22 |
| Total | | 5,770 | 100.00 | |

== See also ==
- List of mayors of Moose Jaw
