= Moose Jaw Fire Department =

Fire department in Moose Jaw, Saskatchewan, Canada

The Moose Jaw Fire Department, founded in 1906, is a 49-member fire brigade which provides fire suppression to Moose Jaw, Saskatchewan, Canada, and 15 Wing Moose Jaw, a military base just south of the city. The department also has agreements with some rural communities around Moose Jaw.

The fire department has a guaranteed five-minute response time. In 2004 they had 658 emergency calls. Their motto is "Save Lives and Protect Property."

In 2010, the executive committee decided to buy new radios to replace the fire department's communication system, which had been connected to the old provincial emergency system.

The Moose Jaw Fire Department spearheaded fundraising of $900,000 for the only hyperbaric chamber in Saskatchewan, which was closed in 2021.

In 2023 the Moose Jaw Fire Department dealt with a large fire on Thatcher Drive, the biggest since 2004. It received over 900 emergency calls in 2024.
