= Greg Lawrence =

Canadian politician

Member of the Saskatchewan Legislative Assembly for Moose Jaw Wakamow
- In office November 7, 2011 – October 1, 2024
- Preceded by: Deb Higgins
- Succeeded by: Megan Patterson

Personal details
- Born: January 29, 1966 (age 60) Bienfait, Saskatchewan, Canada
- Party: Independent
- Other political affiliations: Saskatchewan Party (2011-2024)

Greg Lawrence (born January 29, 1966) is a Canadian politician elected to represent the electoral district of Moose Jaw Wakamow in the Legislative Assembly of Saskatchewan in the 2011 election. He served as a member of the Saskatchewan Party until 2024. until resigning from caucus on January 30, 2024 due to a police investigation into "historical complaints". On January 31, 2024, Lawrence was charged with assault, along with a separate charge of assault by choking. Lawrence had previously announced he would not run again in the 2024 election due to injuries sustained in a motorcycle accident.
