= Lorne Calvert =

13th Premier of Saskatchewan (2001–2007)

The Reverend and Honourable Lorne Calvert ECS SOM
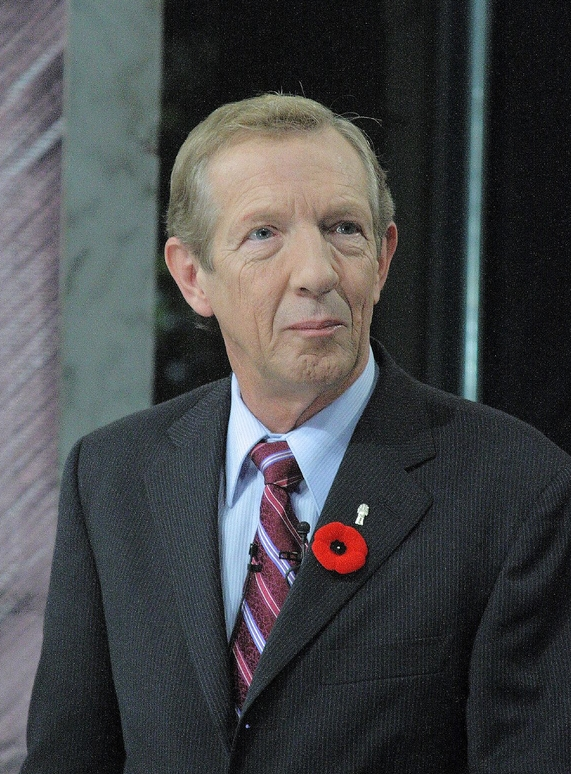
- Calvert in 2007

13th Premier of Saskatchewan
- In office February 8, 2001 – November 21, 2007
- Monarch: Elizabeth II
- Lieutenant Governor: Lynda Haverstock; Gordon Barnhart
- Preceded by: Roy Romanow
- Succeeded by: Brad Wall

Leader of the Saskatchewan New Democratic Party
- In office January 27, 2001 – June 6, 2009
- Preceded by: Roy Romanow
- Succeeded by: Dwain Lingenfelter

Saskatchewan Leader of the Opposition
- In office November 21, 2007 – June 6, 2009
- Preceded by: Brad Wall
- Succeeded by: Dwain Lingenfelter

Saskatchewan Minister of Health
- In office February 3, 1995 – November 22, 1995
- Premier: Roy Romanow
- Preceded by: Louise Simard
- Succeeded by: Eric Cline

Saskatchewan Minister of Social Services
- In office November 22, 1995 – September 21, 1998
- Premier: Roy Romanow
- Preceded by: Bob Pringle
- Succeeded by: Harry Van Mulligen

Member of the Legislative Assembly of Saskatchewan
- In office March 19, 2001 – June 30, 2009
- Preceded by: Roy Romanow
- Succeeded by: Danielle Chartier
- Constituency: Saskatoon Riversdale
- In office October 20, 1986 – August 16, 1999
- Preceded by: Bud Smith
- Succeeded by: Deb Higgins
- Constituency: Moose Jaw Wakamow (1991–1999); Moose Jaw South (1986–1991)

Personal details
- Born: Lorne Albert Calvert; December 24, 1952 (age 73) Moose Jaw, Saskatchewan, Canada
- Party: Saskatchewan New Democratic Party
- Education: University of Saskatchewan (Regina Campus and St. Andrew's College)
- Profession: Minister

Lorne Albert Calvert SOM (born December 24, 1952) is a Canadian politician who served as the 13th premier of Saskatchewan, from 2001 to 2007. Calvert served as leader of the Saskatchewan New Democratic Party and Member of the Legislative Assembly for Saskatoon Riversdale from 2001 to 2009, when he retired. He also served as the MLA for Moose Jaw Wakamow from 1986 to 1999.

Calvert became premier when he was elected NDP leader in 2001 after the retirement of Roy Romanow. Campaigning on the party's social democratic legacy, Calvert led the party to a majority government in the 2003 provincial election. His party was defeated in the 2007 election by Brad Wall's Saskatchewan Party. Late in Calvert's tenure as premier, the provincial economy—buoyed by rapidly rising natural resource prices—began a significant upturn.

== Early life and career ==
Calvert was born in Moose Jaw, Saskatchewan. He received his undergraduate degree in economics at the University of Regina. Initially planning to study law, Calvert ultimately decided to study theology and pursue the ministry within the United Church of Canada. After attending St. Andrew's College seminary in Saskatoon, he was ordained as minister of the United Church in 1976 and served as minister of several rural congregations. From 1979 to 1986, Calvert was the minister of the pastoral charge of Zion United Church in Moose Jaw.

== Political career ==
=== NDP MLA (1986–1999) ===
Calvert entered provincial politics ahead of the 1986 provincial election, running as a New Democrat on a platform of prohibiting the construction of a proposed casino in Moose Jaw. He was elected to the Legislative Assembly of Saskatchewan as the Member (MLA) for the constituency of Moose Jaw South, serving in the Official Opposition to Grant Devine's Progressive Conservative government. Calvert was re-elected in the 1991 and 1995 elections, when the NDP was both times elected to majority governments under the leadership of Roy Romanow. Calvert held a number of cabinet positions during his tenure, including as associate minister of health and minister responsible for SaskPower and SaskEnergy; from 1995, he was responsible for two large portfolios as both Minister of Health and Minister of Social Services.

Romanow's tenure was noted for its fiscal conservatism, and the NDP's embrace of Third Way politics in the 1990s was divisive within the party. Calvert decided not to run in the 1999 election—which resulted in a minority NDP government—and was succeeded by Deb Higgins in the Moose Jaw riding.

=== Premier of Saskatchewan (2001–2007) ===
In late 2000, Romanow announced that he would be retiring from politics, setting the stage for a party leadership race leading directly to the premier's office—the first such race since Woodrow Lloyd succeeded Tommy Douglas as NDP leader and premier in 1961. The 2001 leadership election was highly contested, with seven candidates making it the biggest NDP leadership race in history. It was also the first such election to employ a one-member, one-vote policy, rather than a delegated election. Calvert joined the race, alongside former NDP MP and then-provincial justice minister Chris Axworthy, three sitting cabinet ministers in Buckley Belanger, Joanne Crofford, and Maynard Sonntag, former National Farmers Union president Nettie Wiebe, and former Young New Democrats president Scott Banda. Axworthy was the perceived frontrunner, expected to continue Romanow's legacy; Calvert and Wiebe, meanwhile, ran more leftwing campaigns, with Wiebe running an explicitly anti-neoliberal campaign, and Calvert a more traditional social democratic one, advocating for a greater focus on social programs, especially in healthcare and education. Wiebe finished third, and Calvert—who led on every ballot—defeated Axworthy on the final ballot with 58% of nearly 18,000 votes. With the victory, Calvert became premier on February 8, 2001.

After securing the party leadership, Calvert was elected to the legislature in a by-election in Romanow's former riding of Saskatoon Riversdale; moving to Saskatoon from Moose Jaw, Calvert campaigned on a pledge to work closely with local community groups.

Calvert took the helm of the NDP at a time when the Saskatchewan Party—a new unified conservative political party established in 1997—appeared on the cusp of a breakthrough after reducing the NDP to a minority government in 1999 with a strong performance in rural Saskatchewan. The Saskatchewan Party led polling ahead of the 2003 provincial election. However, Calvert followed through on his promise to significantly increase social spending, particularly in education and healthcare, and persistently drew a stark contrast between his party's support for the province's major remaining crown corporations and Saskatchewan Party leader Elwin Hermanson's willingness to pursue privatization. In November 2003, the NDP narrowly regained a majority government, winning 30 of 58 seats.

During his full term in office, Calvert expanded child care spaces and introduced a number of targeted welfare programs. The government also began reforming immigration systems to attract more immigrants, and expanded investment in renewable energy and energy conservation. Calvert's spending plans were buoyed by a renewed boom in commodity prices, which led to significant increases in resource revenue for the province. Calvert instigated a tax review committee that led to corporate tax cuts, designed to bring the province more in line with its neighbours. Along with tweaks to income taxes and resource royalties, this has been credited with instigating a period of rapid growth in the provincial economy. The NDP cut the provincial sales tax down to five percent, froze tuition, and invested in highway renewal.

Late in the term, Calvert became increasingly antagonistic with the federal government, a minority parliament led by Stephen Harper's Conservatives. In March 2007, Calvert argued that the clawback of non-renewable resource revenues from the equalization formula as implemented in the 2007 federal budget would leave Saskatchewan getting significantly less than had been promised. Calvert instructed his government to prepare a lawsuit against the federal government, a tactic that was interrupted by the fall provincial election.

Calvert and his government were defeated in the 2007 provincial election, in which management of the province's booming economy and health care became focal points. The NDP's central campaign commitment was a universal drug plan capping prescription drug costs at $15. Importantly, unlike Hermanson, new Saskatchewan Party leader Brad Wall made a vocal commitment not to privatize the province's crown corporations. The result was a drop to 20 seats for the NDP while Wall's party won a majority government. Upon defeat, Calvert expressed pride in a "good run in government" for the NDP. After the election, Calvert—who retained his Saskatoon Riversdale seat—said he had no immediate plans to step down as leader, but conceded that he was unlikely to lead the party into the next election.

=== Retirement ===
Just two weeks after the 2007 election, federal NDP spokesman Brad Lavigne confirmed to reporters that Jack Layton's office had asked Calvert to consider standing as a candidate in the 2008 federal election. Calvert declined to run, but stated that he would support the party's federal candidates.

Calvert announced on October 16, 2008, that he would be stepping down as party leader, triggering a leadership race. Dwain Lingenfelter, a former cabinet minister in the government's of Romanow and Allan Blakeney, was elected the party's new leader in a four-person contest on June 6, 2009. At the end of the Spring session in May 2009, Calvert touted the economic progress his government had made, and revealed that he planned to return to the United Church.

== Post-retirement and honours ==
From 2009 to 2018, Calvert was the principal at St. Andrew's College in Saskatoon. In 2019, St. Andrew's awarded Calvert with an honorary Doctor of Divinity degree. In 2015, Calvert was named to the Saskatchewan Order of Merit.

In 2021, a campground and walking trail in Moose Jaw were renamed after Calvert.

== Controversies ==
During the 2003 election campaign, Calvert denounced and apologized for an internal cartoon that was leaked to the media, depicting Saskatchewan Party leader Hermanson loading NDP sympathizers onto rail cars—the cartoon referred to speculation that Hermanson wanted to replace civil servants with Saskatchewan Party supporters. B'nai Brith Canada stated that the cartoon "trivializes the crimes of the Holocaust and causes undeserved anguish to those who survived that evil regime".

== Personal life ==
Calvert is married to Betty Calvert; they have two children.

In 2005, Calvert made a cameo appearance on the Saskatchewan-based sitcom Corner Gas. One of Calvert's longstanding hobbies was renovating vintage school and highway buses into camping vehicles.

Calvert's home at Buffalo Pound Lake burned down in 2025. Calvert was at home with family when a neighbour noticed the fire and alerted them; there were no injuries from the fire.

== Electoral record ==
Electoral history of NDP under Lorne Calvert
Year	Party	Votes			Seats		Position
Year	Party	Total	%	±%	Total	±	Position
2003	NDP	190,923	44.7%	+6%	30 / 58	+2	Majority government
2007	NDP	168,704	37.2%	–7.4%	20 / 58	–10	Official Opposition

Constituency elections

2007 Saskatchewan general election: Saskatoon Riversdale
Party	Candidate	Votes	%
New Democratic	Lorne Calvert	3,524	56.11
Saskatchewan	Fred Ozimey	2,040	32.48
Liberal	Roman Todos	506	8.06
Green	Jan Norris	121	1.93
Marijuana	Michael Kereiff	89	1.42
Total valid votes		6,280	100.00
Source: Saskatchewan Archives - Election Results by Electoral Division

2003 Saskatchewan general election: Saskatoon Riversdale
Party	Candidate	Votes	%
New Democratic	Lorne Calvert	3,608	62.72
Saskatchewan	Fred Ozimey	1,302	22.63
Liberal	Deneen Gudjonson	754	13.12
New Green	Keith Morvick	52	0.90
Progressive Conservative	Glen Schriener	37	0.64
Total valid votes		5,753	100.00
Source: Saskatchewan Archives - Election Results by Electoral Division

2001 by election: Saskatoon Riversdale
Party	Candidate	Votes	%
New Democratic	Lorne Calvert	2,583	56.24
Saskatchewan	Ted Merriman	1,547	33.68
Liberal	Dwayne Roth	309	6.73
First Nations	John Melenchuk	115	2.50
New Green	Neil Sinclair	39	0.85
Total valid votes		4,593	100.00
Source: Saskatchewan Archives - Election Results by Electoral Division

1995 Saskatchewan general election: Moose Jaw Wakamow
Party	Candidate	Votes	%
New Democratic	Lorne Calvert	3,803	62.95
Liberal	Jim Carr	1,577	26.11
Progressive Conservative	Norma Donovan	661	10.94
Total valid votes		6,041	100.00
Source: Saskatchewan Archives - Election Results by Electoral Division

1991 Saskatchewan general election: Moose Jaw Wakamow
Party	Candidate	Votes	%
New Democratic	Lorne Calvert	6,083	67.24
Liberal	Randy Roman	1,799	19.89
Progressive Conservative	Lisa Acton	1,164	12.87
Total valid votes		9,046	100.00
Source: Saskatchewan Archives - Election Results by Electoral Division

1986 Saskatchewan general election: Moose Jaw South
Party	Candidate	Votes	%
New Democratic	Lorne Calvert	4,959	58.45
Progressive Conservative	Arthur Leslie Smith	2,823	33.27
Liberal	Irene McKenzie	653	7.70
Western Canada Concept	Phoebe Dowhy	49	0.58
Total valid votes		8,484	100.00
Source: Saskatchewan Archives - Election Results by Electoral Division

== See also ==
- List of premiers of Saskatchewan
- List of premiers of Saskatchewan by time in office
