= Buffalo Pound Provincial Park =

Provincial park in Saskatchewan, Canada

- IUCN category II (national park)
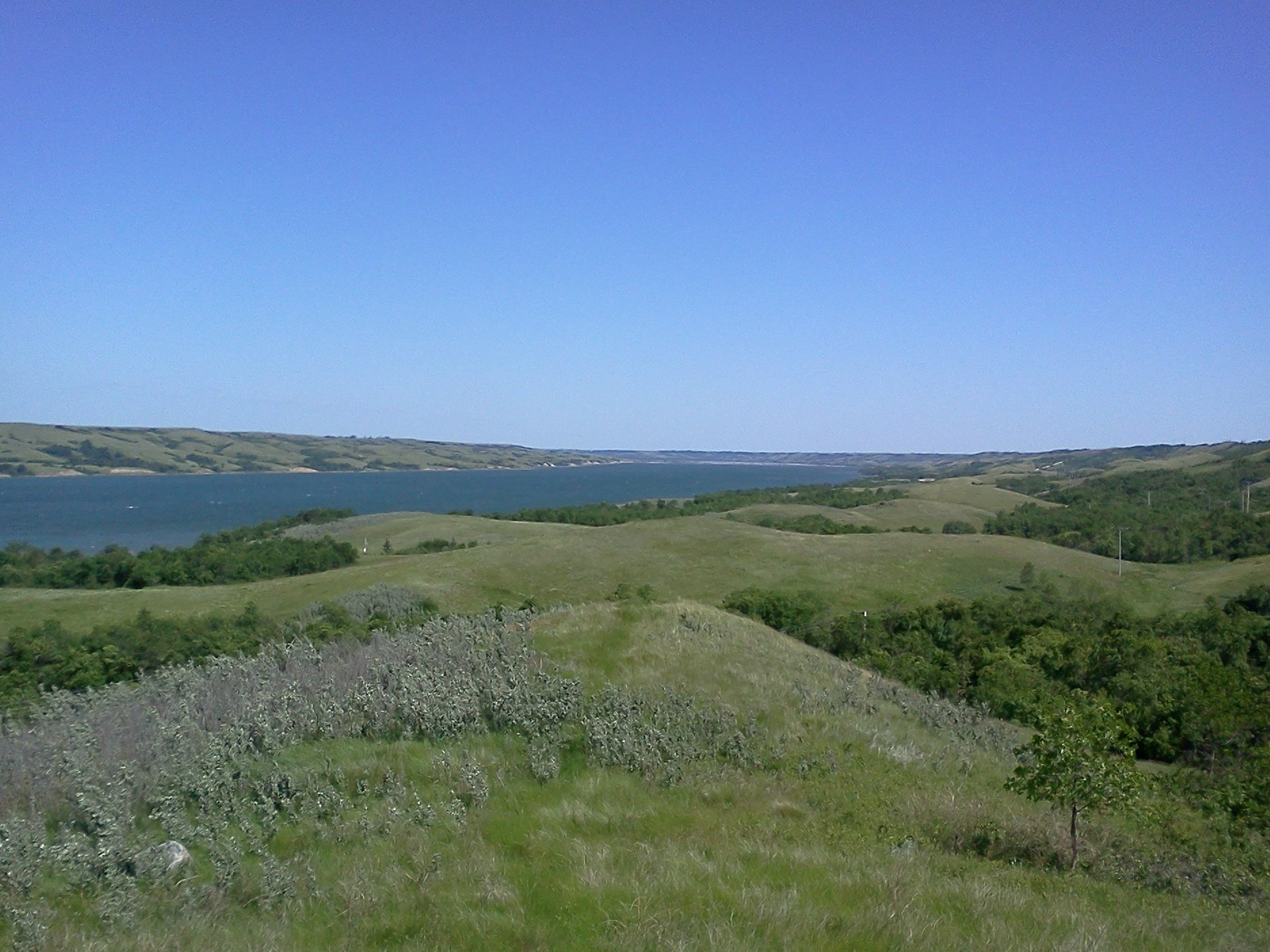
- Buffalo Pound Provincial Park

- Location within Saskatchewan Location within Canada
- Interactive map of Buffalo Pound Provincial Park
- Location: RM of Moose Jaw No. 161, Saskatchewan, Canada
- Nearest city: Moose Jaw
- Coordinates: 50°35′14″N 105°23′45″W
- Created: 1963
- Established: 1963
- Named for: Buffalo Pound Lake
- Governing body: Sask Parks
- Website: Official website

Buffalo Pound Provincial Park is in southern Saskatchewan, Canada, about 30 kilometres (19 mi) north-east of Moose Jaw and 86 kilometres (53 mi) north-west of the city of Regina. Access to the provincial park is from Highways 301 and 202.

The park centres on Buffalo Pound Lake, a prairie lake formed from glaciation about 10,000 years ago. Seasonal recreation activities include swimming (two public beaches and a pool), camping, fishing, mini-golf, biking, hiking, and access to the Trans Canada Trail. The park also features a captive herd of buffalo, along with the Nicolle Flats Marsh where a variety of wildlife can be observed. There is also a trout pond, known as Buffalo Pond, which is stocked with rainbow, brown, and tiger trout.

== Amenities and attractions ==
There are seven different camping areas in the park with a total of about 270 campsites. Many of the individual sites have electric, water, and sewer services. The seven campgrounds are Lake Side, Elm View, Valley, Maple Vale, Shady Lane, Trail Ends, Lower Chalet, and Rankins Campgrounds.

Two disc golf courses are in the park. One is a 9-hole course for beginners and the other is a professional 18-hole course.

Completed in 2020, the park features a 4,000-square foot heated swimming pool called Buffalo Pound Provincial Park Pool. This pool replaced the original one, which was built in 1972.

Opportunities are available for canoeing, kayaking, swimming, fishing, and boating at the beach areas along the lake. There are over 30 kilometres (19 mi) of mountain biking trails of varying difficulty levels, multiple hiking and walking trails totalling over 16 kilometres (9.9 mi), bison viewing areas, mini-golf, and picnicking sites.

== Nicolle Flats Marsh ==
Nicolle Flats Marsh, with a total area of 73.18 km^{2} (28.25 sq mi) and an elevation of 511 m (1,677 ft), is a large marshy area located in the park at the south-east corner of Buffalo Pound Lake. The confluence of the Qu'Appelle and Moose Jaw Rivers is in the marsh. The area is an Important Bird Area of Canada (Nicolle Flats SK 060) and is home to several species including mallards, American white pelicans, black-crowned night herons, Franklin's gulls, willow flycatchers, yellow-breasted chats, great blue herons, and black terns.

Several interpretive trails wind their way in and around the marsh and park area, including Nicolle Flats Trail (9.8 km (6.1 mi)), Valley Interpretive Trail (1.5 km (0.93 mi)), Dyke Trail (4.5 km (2.8 mi)), Bison View Interpretive Trail (3 km (1.9 mi)), and Marsh Boardwalk Trail (0.5 km (0.31 mi)). The Dyke Trail is part of the Trans Canada Trail.

=== Nicolle Homestead ===
The Nicolle Homestead (50.5613°N 105.2995°W) was built by Charles Nicolle and his family in 1903. It is located at the easternmost part of the park. Charles Nicolle was a veteran of the North-West Mounted Police and settled in the Qu'Appelle Valley with his family and 1881. All that remains of the homestead is the fieldstone house that was built in 1903. The farm was named Mapleford and the Nicolle family lived and farmed there until 1959. The site can be reached along the Nicolle Flats Trail.

== See also ==
- List of provincial parks in Saskatchewan
- List of protected areas of Saskatchewan
- List of disc golf courses in Canada
- Tourism in Saskatchewan
