= Tuxford, Saskatchewan =

Village in Saskatchewan, Canada

Coordinates: 50°34′26″N 105°34′56″W

Location of Tuxford in Saskatchewan

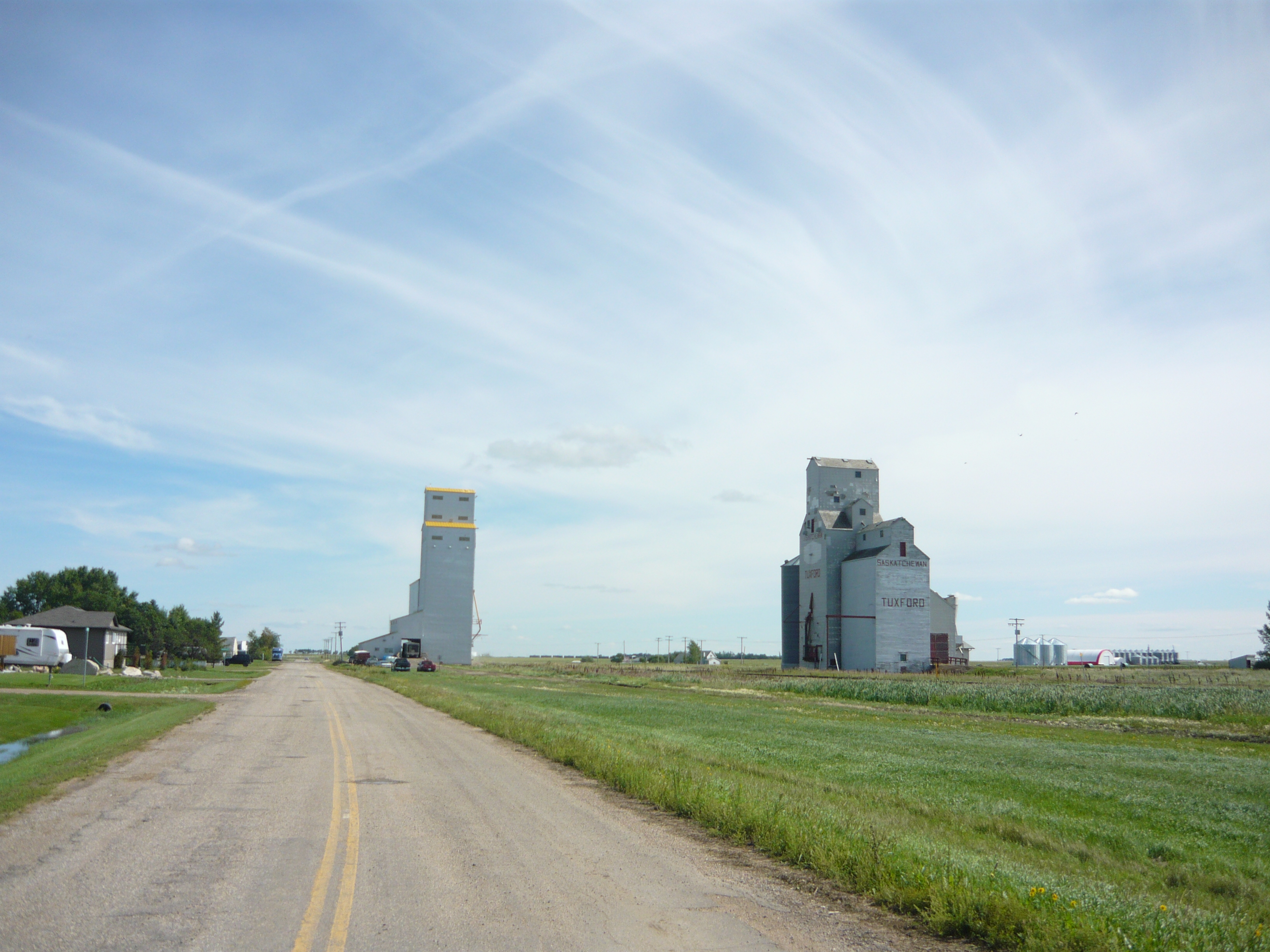
Grain elevators

Tuxford (2016 population: 113) is a village in the Canadian province of Saskatchewan within the Rural Municipality of Marquis No. 191 and Census Division No. 7. Moose Jaw is 14 kilometres (8.7 mi) south and Buffalo Pound Lake is 16 kilometres (9.9 mi) north. Highway 2, Highway 42 and Highway 202 all intersect in the community. Highway 202 connects the community to Buffalo Pound Provincial Park 11 kilometres (6.8 mi) to the east.

Founded in 1907, the community was named after General George Stuart Tuxford of the 3rd Canadian Infantry Brigade, 1st Canadian Division. The community celebrated its centennial in 2007.

== History ==
Tuxford incorporated as a village on July 19, 1907.

== Demographics ==
Population history (1981–2016)
Year	Pop.	±%
1981	90	—
1986	76	−15.6%
1991	92	+21.1%
1996	102	+10.9%
2001	97	−4.9%
2006	88	−9.3%
2011	91	+3.4%
2016	113	+24.2%
Source: Statistics Canada via Saskatchewan Bureau of Statistics

In the 2021 Census of Population conducted by Statistics Canada, Tuxford had a population of 103 living in 40 of its 42 total private dwellings, a change of -8.8% from its 2016 population of 113. With a land area of 0.68 km^{2} (0.26 sq mi), it had a population density of 151.5/km^{2} (392.3/sq mi) in 2021.

In the 2016 Census of Population, the Village of Tuxford recorded a population of 113 living in 42 of its 44 total private dwellings, a 19.5% change from its 2011 population of 91. With a land area of 0.62 km^{2} (0.24 sq mi), it had a population density of 182.3/km^{2} (472.0/sq mi) in 2016.
