= Moose Jaw station (Canadian National Railway) =

Railway station in Saskatchewan, Canada

Coordinates: 50.3944°N 105.5262°W

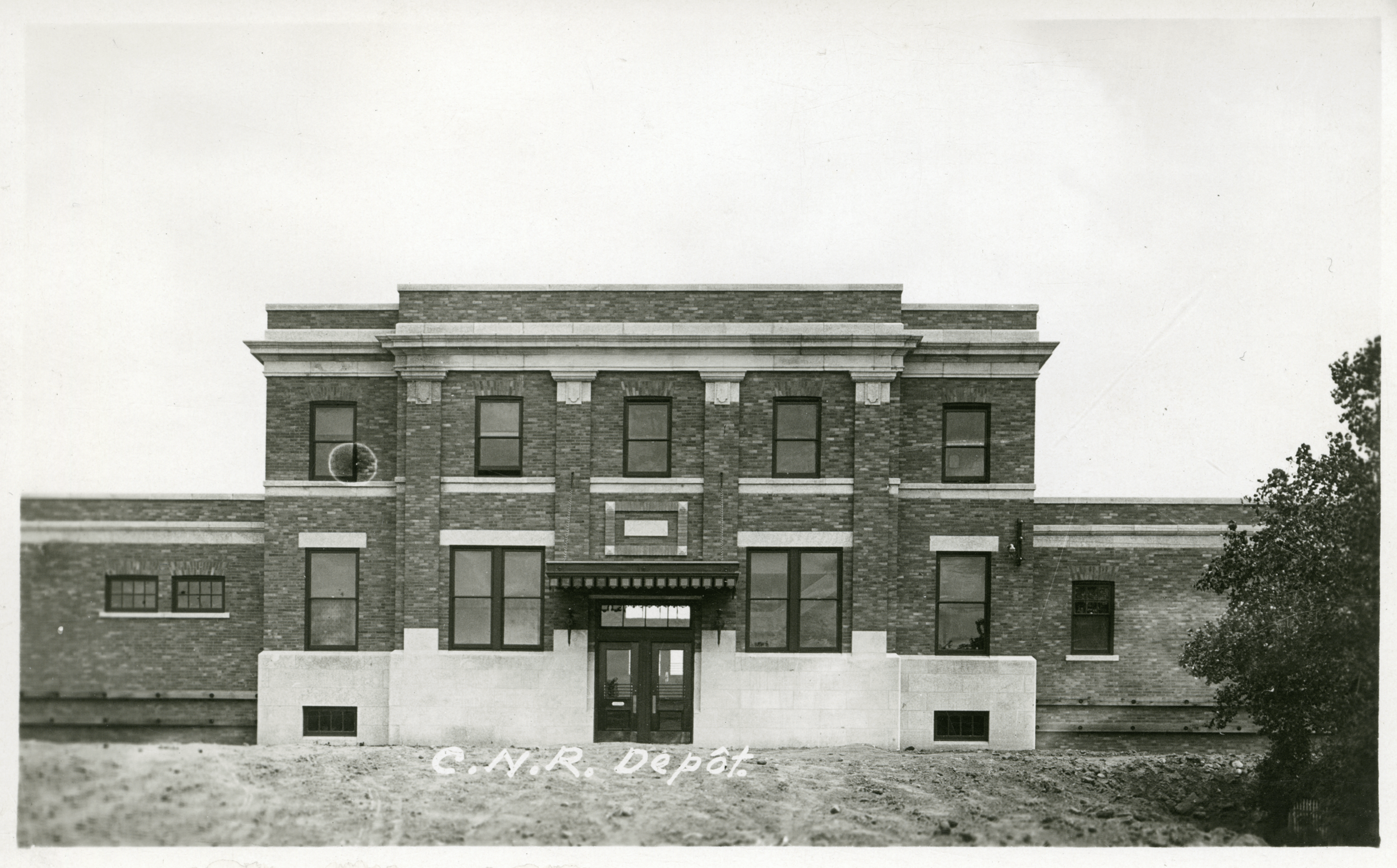
- Photo of the station, likely 1920s or 1930s

General information
- Location: 341 Stadacona Street E, Moose Jaw, Saskatchewan, S6H, Canada, Moose Jaw, Saskatchewan
- Line: Canadian National Railway

History
- Opened: 1919

Former services
Preceding station	Canadian National Railway	Following station
Antar toward Neidpath	Neidpath – Regina	Burdick toward Regina
Location

The Moose Jaw station is a former railway station in Moose Jaw, Saskatchewan, Canada. It was designed by John Schoefield, and built by the Canadian National Railway in 1919. The station, consisting of a two-storey central block with single-storey wings to the north and south, is constructed primarily of Claybank brick and Tyndall stone. The building was designated a historic railway station in 1992, and a municipal heritage property by the City of Moose Jaw on 8 April 2002. Its exterior has been restored and its interior extensively renovated by its current occupant, Sahara Spa, which operates a destination day spa in the building.
