= Megan Patterson =

Canadian politician

Megan Patterson MLA

Member of the Saskatchewan Legislative Assembly for Moose Jaw Wakamow
- Incumbent
- Assumed office October 28, 2024
- Preceded by: Greg Lawrence

Personal details
- Party: Saskatchewan Party
- Occupation: academic instructor

Megan Patterson is a Canadian politician who was elected to the Legislative Assembly of Saskatchewan in the 2024 general election, representing Moose Jaw Wakamow as a member of the Saskatchewan Party.

== Electoral record ==
2024 Saskatchewan general election: Moose Jaw Wakamow
Party	Candidate	Votes	%	±%
Saskatchewan	Megan Patterson	3,819	55.02	+0.92
New Democratic	Melissa Patterson	2,894	41.69	+1.69
Green	Michael Gardiner	228	3.28	+1.08
Total valid votes		6,941	99.40	
Total rejected ballots		42	0.60	-0.10
Turnout		6,983	52.71	–
Eligible voters		13,249		
Saskatchewan hold		Swing		–
Source: Elections Saskatchewan
