= Moose Jaw City Hall =

Building in Saskatchewan, Canada

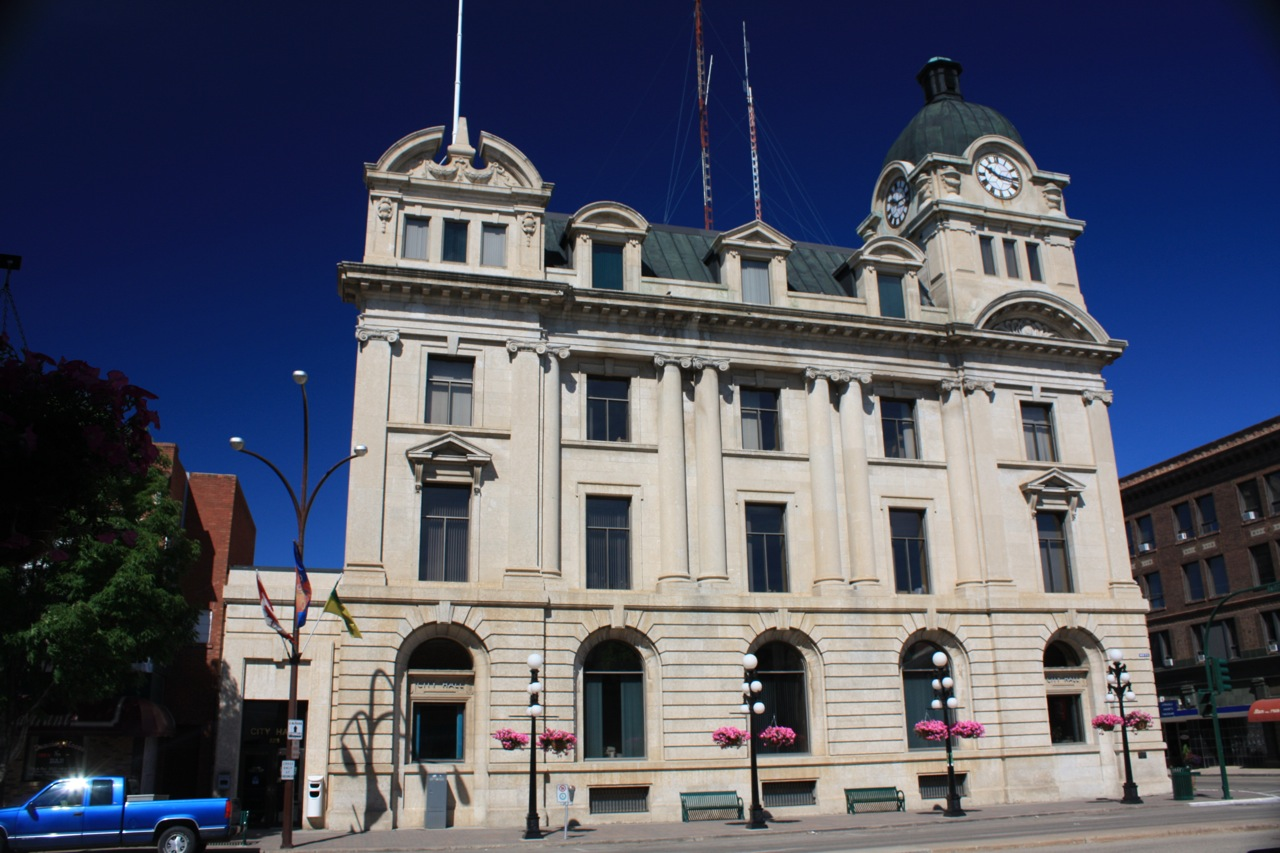
- City Hall Building

General information
- Architectural style: Edwardian Classical
- Location: 228 Main Street N, Moose Jaw, Saskatchewan, Canada
- Coordinates: 50.3923°N 105.5352°W
- Construction started: 1911/01/01
- Completed: 1914/12/31
- Client: Government of Canada

Design and construction
- Architect: David Ewart

The Moose Jaw City Hall is home to the Moose Jaw City Council and is located at 228 Main Street North in Moose Jaw, Saskatchewan, Canada, and is designated as a municipal heritage property. The building was originally designed and built by the J. McDiarmid Company for the Government of Canada to house a post office, Royal Canadian Mounted Police station and other government offices. In 1965 the building was sold by the federal government to the City of Moose Jaw and converted into a city hall.

Moose Jaw Police Service Headquarters is located in a building attached at the rear of the building.

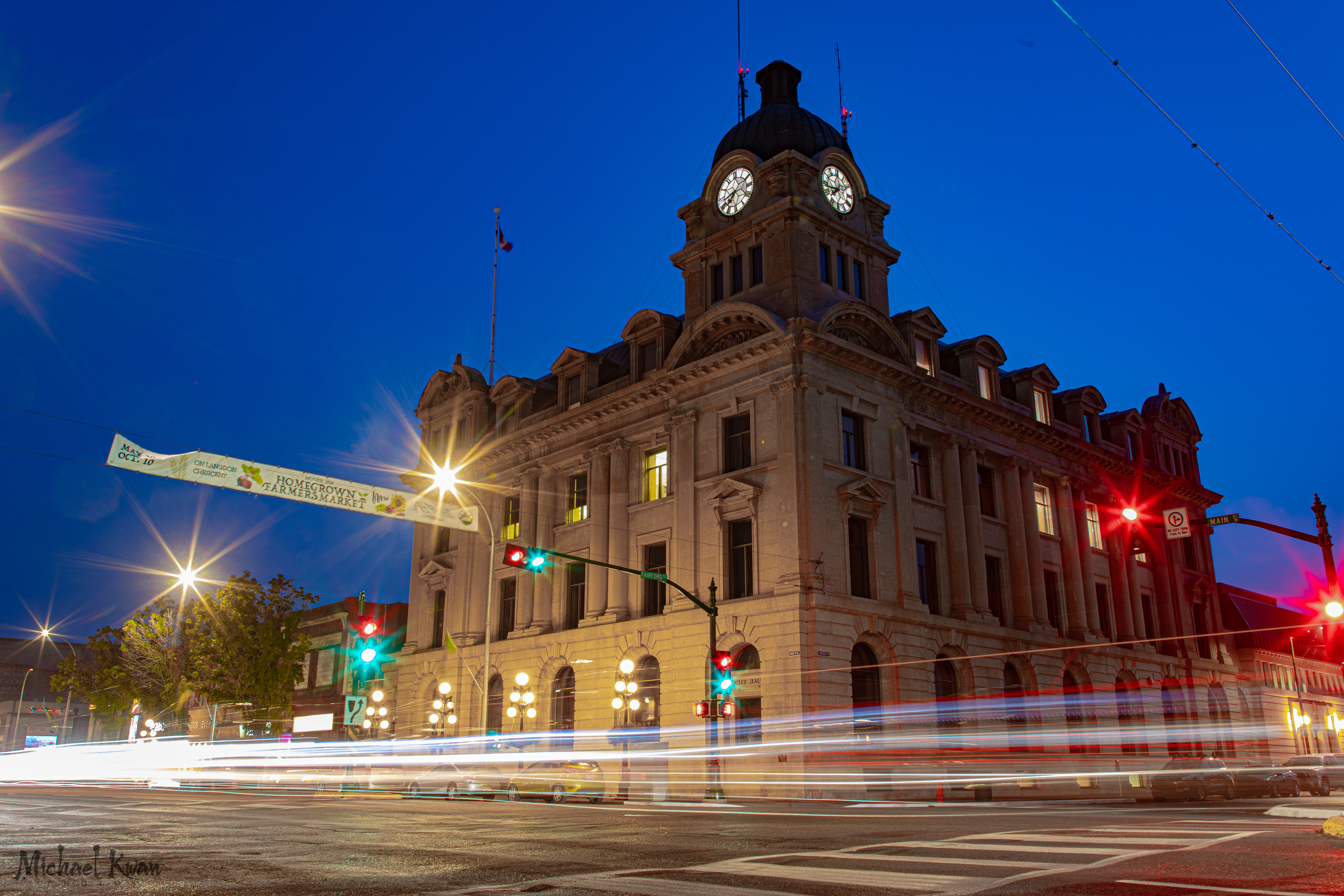
MJ City Hall at night

== Former City Hall ==
The city's first city hall was a Beaux Arts building built in 1904 at the southeast corner of 76 Fairford Street West and 1 Avenue NW in the area known as City Square and demolished with the Annex in the 1950s. The site is now a parking lot next to Moose Jaw Police HQ and steps from the current City Hall at Fairford Street West and Main Street North.
