= Parkview, Saskatchewan =

Coordinates: 50°37′00″N 105°27′28″W

Parkview is a hamlet in the Canadian province of Saskatchewan.

== Demographics ==
In the 2021 Census of Population conducted by Statistics Canada, Parkview had a population of 56 living in 30 of its 76 total private dwellings, a change of 75% from its 2016 population of 32. With a land area of 0.39 km^{2} (0.15 sq mi), it had a population density of 143.6/km^{2} (371.9/sq mi) in 2021.
