= Rural Municipality of Moose Jaw No. 161 =

Rural municipality in Saskatchewan, Canada

Moose Jaw No. 161
- Rural municipality
- Rural Municipality of Moose Jaw No. 161

- Location of the RM of Moose Jaw No. 161 in Saskatchewan
- Coordinates: 50.443°N 105.513°W
- Country: Canada
- Province: Saskatchewan
- Census division: 7
- SARM division: 2
- Formed: December 11, 1911

Government
  - Reeve: Ron Brumwell
  - Governing body: RM of Moose Jaw No. 161 Council
  - Administrator: Mike Wirges
  - Office location: Moose Jaw

Area (2016)
  - Land: 793.73 km^{2} (306.46 sq mi)

Population (2016)
  - Total: 1,163
  - Density: 1.5/km^{2} (3.9/sq mi)
- Time zone: CST
  - Summer (DST): CST
- Area codes: 306 and 639
- Website: Official website

The Rural Municipality of Moose Jaw No. 161 (2016 population: 1,163) is a rural municipality (RM) in the Canadian province of Saskatchewan within Census Division No. 7 and SARM Division No. 2. It is located in the south-central portion of the province, surrounding the city of Moose Jaw.

== History ==
The RM of Moose Jaw No. 161 incorporated as a rural municipality on December 11, 1911.

== Geography ==
=== Communities and localities ===
The following urban municipalities are surrounded by the RM.

Cities

- Moose Jaw

Villages

- Tuxford

The following unincorporated communities are within the RM.

Localities

- Boharm
- Bushell Park

== Demographics ==
Population history (1981–2016)
| Year | Pop. | ±% |
|---|---|---|
| 1981 | 2,116 | — |
| 1986 | 2,146 | +1.4% |
| 1991 | 1,959 | −8.7% |
| 1996 | 1,856 | −5.3% |
| 2001 | 1,388 | −25.2% |
| 2006 | 1,228 | −11.5% |
| 2011 | 1,147 | −6.6% |
| 2016 | 1,163 | +1.4% |
Source: Statistics Canada via Saskatchewan Bureau of Statistics

In the 2021 Census of Population conducted by Statistics Canada, the RM of Moose Jaw No. 161 had a population of 1,207 living in 496 of its 557 total private dwellings, a change of 5.6% from its 2016 population of 1,143. With a land area of 777.62 km^{2} (300.24 sq mi), it had a population density of 1.6/km^{2} (4.0/sq mi) in 2021.

In the 2016 Census of Population, the RM of Moose Jaw No. 161 recorded a population of 1,163 living in 459 of its 524 total private dwellings, a 1.4% increase from its 2011 population of 1,147. With a land area of 793.73 km^{2} (306.46 sq mi), it had a population density of 1.5/km^{2} (3.8/sq mi) in 2016.

== Government ==
The RM of Moose Jaw No. 161 is governed by an elected municipal council and an appointed administrator that meets on the second Tuesday of every month. The reeve of the RM is Ron Brumwell while its administrator is Mike Wirges. The RM's office is located in Moose Jaw.
