= Moose Jaw =

City in Saskatchewan, Canada

- City
- City of Moose Jaw
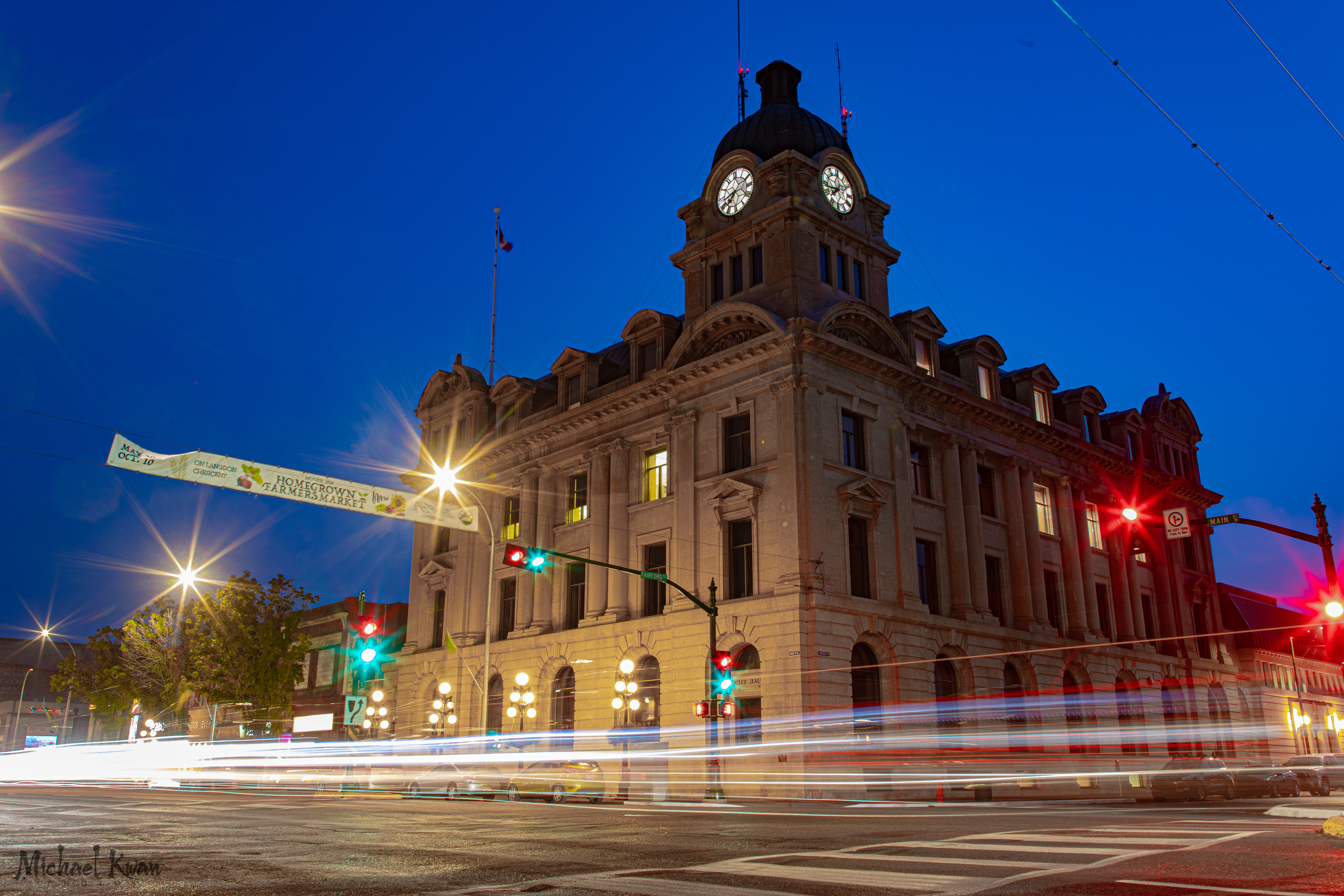
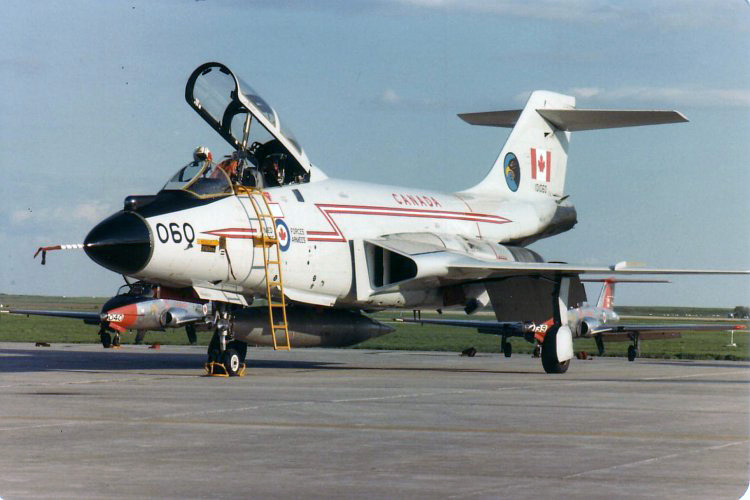
- Skyline of Moose Jaw City Hall CFB Moose Jaw
- Nicknames: "The Jaw", "Band City", "Little Chicago", "Canada's Most Notorious City"
- Location of Moose Jaw
- Coordinates: 50°23′36″N 105°33′07″W
- Country: Canada
- Province: Saskatchewan
- Settled: 1882
- Proclaimed as a Town: 1884
- Incorporated as a City: 1903

Government
  - Mayor: James Murdock
  - Governing body: Moose Jaw City Council List of City Councillors: Patrick Boyle; Carla Delaurier; Heather Eby; Jamey Logan; Dawn Luhning; Chris Warren
  - MP: Fraser Tolmie (CPC)
  - MLAs: Tim McLeod (SKP); Megan Patterson (SKP)

Area
  - Total: 46.82 km^{2} (18.08 sq mi)

Population (2021)
  - Total: 33,665
  - Density: 710.7/km^{2} (1,841/sq mi)
- Demonym: Moose Javian
- Time zone: UTC-6 (CST)
- Forward sortation area: S6H–S6K
- Area codes: 306 and 639
- Website: www.moosejaw.ca

Moose Jaw is the fourth-largest city in Saskatchewan, Canada. Lying on the Moose Jaw River in the south-central part of the province, it is situated on the Trans-Canada Highway, 177 kilometres (110 mi) east of Swift Current and 77 kilometres (48 mi) west of Regina. Residents of Moose Jaw are known as Moose Javians. The city is surrounded by the Rural Municipality of Moose Jaw No. 161.

Moose Jaw is an industrial centre and a critical railway junction for the area's agricultural produce. CFB Moose Jaw, located a few kilometres south of the city, is a NATO flight training school and is home to the Snowbirds, Canada's military aerobatic air show flight demonstration team. Moose Jaw also has a casino and geothermal spa.

== History ==
Cree and Assiniboine people used the Moose Jaw area as a winter encampment. The Missouri Coteau sheltered the valley and gave it warm breezes. The narrow river crossing and abundant water and game made it a good location for settlement. Traditional native fur traders and Métis buffalo hunters created the first permanent settlement at a place called "the turn", at present-day Kingsway Park, also known as the Kai Gauthier Park.

The confluence of the Moose Jaw River and Thunder Creek was chosen and registered in 1881 as a site for a division point for the Canadian Pacific Railway (CPR), whose construction was significant in the Confederation of Canada. The water supply there was significant for steam locomotives. Settlement began there in 1882, and the city was incorporated in 1903. The railways played an important role in the early development of Moose Jaw, with the city having both a Canadian Pacific Railway Station and a Canadian National Railway Station. A dam was built on the river in 1883 to create a year-round water supply.

Marked on a map as Moose Jaw Bone Creek in an 1857 survey by surveyor John Palliser, two theories exist regarding how the city was named. The first is it comes from the Plains Cree name moscâstani-sîpiy meaning "a warm place by the river", indicative of the protection from the weather the Coteau range provides to the river valley containing the city and also the Plains Cree word moscâs, meaning warm breezes. The other is that the section of the Moose Jaw River that runs through the city is shaped like a moose's jaw.

There is also an untrue story of the name being inspired by the Earl of Dunmore, for whom Dunmore, Alberta is named, repairing his cart with the jawbone of a moose during his travels there.

The city was the site of the 1954 mid-air collision of Trans-Canada Air Lines Flight 9.

=== Military presence ===
The Royal Canadian Air Force under the British Commonwealth Air Training Plan established RCAF Station Moose Jaw in 1940. After the war, the RCAF remained in the community and used the facility for training pilots through the Cold War. The facility changed its name to CFB Moose Jaw in 1968 and is now Canada's primary military flight training centre and the home of 431 (Air Demonstration) Squadron (aka the "Snowbirds").

CFB Moose Jaw's primary lodger unit is "15 Wing". In the Royal Canadian Air Force, the lodger unit is often called 15 Wing Moose Jaw. The base usually holds an Armed Forces Day each year.

The Saskatchewan Dragoons is a reserve armoured regiment with an armoury in the city's north end.

== Royal presence ==
Many members of the Royal Family have visited Moose Jaw. Edward, Prince of Wales, who owned a ranch in Pekisko, Alberta, visited in 1919, 1924, and 1927. Prince Albert, future king and father of Queen Elizabeth II, paid a visit in 1926. King George VI and his wife Queen Elizabeth (later known as Queen Elizabeth the Queen Mother) visited during the Royal tour in 1939. Queen Elizabeth II first visited in 1959 and returned on multiple separate occasions.

During his time as Earl of Wessex, Prince Edward became Colonel-in-Chief of the Saskatchewan Dragoons of Moose Jaw on visiting Saskatchewan in 2003 when he congratulated the regiment on its "contribution to Canada's proud tradition of citizen-soldiers in the community." Involved in peacekeeping operations in Cyprus, the Golan Heights, Bosnia and Croatia, the regiment has also provided aid during floods and forest fires in the prairies. The Prince returned to visit his regiment in 2006.

Prince Edward also inaugurated the Queen's Jubilee Rose Garden in Moose Jaw on his 2003 visit. Other royal connections to the city include King George School and Prince Arthur Community School, both named for royal family members. Additionally, the South Hill school was formerly named King Edward Elementary School.

Following the death of Queen Elizabeth in 2022, an opinion piece in the National Post noted that the late monarch had "visited Moose Jaw more often than she did Manhattan. The former was part of her realms; the latter not. She was the Queen of Canada and chose to exercise that duty and serve her people over the perquisites of her position."

== Climate ==
Moose Jaw's climate is transitional between semiarid and humid continental (Köppen BSk and Dfb, respectively). Moose Jaw's winters are long, cold and dry, while its summers are short but very warm and relatively wet. The coldest month is January, with a mean temperature of −12 °C (10 °F), while the warmest is July, with a mean temperature of 19.3 °C (66.7 °F). The driest month is February, in which an average of 11.1 millimetres (0.44 in) of precipitation falls, while the wettest month is July, which brings an average of 63.0 millimetres (2.48 in). Annual average precipitation is 365.3 millimetres (14.38 in).

The highest temperature recorded in Moose Jaw was 43.3 °C (109.9 °F) on 5 July 1937. The coldest temperature ever recorded was −47.8 °C (−54.0 °F) on 4 February 1907.

Climate data for CFB Moose Jaw, 1981−2010 normals, extremes 1894–present (Note: Climate data was recorded at Moose Jaw CHAB from March 1894 to May 1954, and at CFB Moose Jaw from January 1943 to present.)
Month	Jan	Feb	Mar	Apr	May	Jun	Jul	Aug	Sep	Oct	Nov	Dec	Year
Record high humidex	12.4	16.2	22.8	31.9	37.5	42.8	45.4	41.4	39.3	31.4	22.2	11.2	45.4
Record high °C (°F)	13.9 (57.0)	17.8 (64.0)	25.6 (78.1)	33.3 (91.9)	38.6 (101.5)	41.2 (106.2)	43.3 (109.9)	42.3 (108.1)	38.9 (102.0)	32.8 (91.0)	23.1 (73.6)	19.4 (66.9)	43.3 (109.9)
Mean daily maximum °C (°F)	−6.9 (19.6)	−4.0 (24.8)	2.7 (36.9)	12.1 (53.8)	19.0 (66.2)	23.9 (75.0)	26.2 (79.2)	26.1 (79.0)	19.2 (66.6)	12.0 (53.6)	0.7 (33.3)	−6.3 (20.7)	10.4 (50.7)
Daily mean °C (°F)	−12.3 (9.9)	−9.1 (15.6)	−2.6 (27.3)	5.2 (41.4)	12.1 (53.8)	17.2 (63.0)	19.3 (66.7)	18.9 (66.0)	12.4 (54.3)	5.6 (42.1)	−4.3 (24.3)	−11.5 (11.3)	4.2 (39.6)
Mean daily minimum °C (°F)	−17.7 (0.1)	−14.2 (6.4)	−7.9 (17.8)	−1.7 (28.9)	5.1 (41.2)	10.4 (50.7)	12.3 (54.1)	11.6 (52.9)	5.6 (42.1)	−0.8 (30.6)	−9.4 (15.1)	−16.6 (2.1)	−1.9 (28.6)
Record low °C (°F)	−47.2 (−53.0)	−47.8 (−54.0)	−44.4 (−47.9)	−28.9 (−20.0)	−12.8 (9.0)	−2.8 (27.0)	0.0 (32.0)	−1.7 (28.9)	−12.8 (9.0)	−25.0 (−13.0)	−41.1 (−42.0)	−42.0 (−43.6)	−47.8 (−54.0)
Record low wind chill	−57.0	−58.0	−49.0	−36.0	−15.0	−7.0	0.0	0.0	−18.0	−32.0	−46.0	−57.0	−58.0
Average precipitation mm (inches)	16.8 (0.66)	11.1 (0.44)	19.7 (0.78)	17.6 (0.69)	48.0 (1.89)	58.8 (2.31)	63.0 (2.48)	39.1 (1.54)	37.7 (1.48)	19.6 (0.77)	17.3 (0.68)	16.5 (0.65)	365.3 (14.38)
Average rainfall mm (inches)	0.4 (0.02)	0.5 (0.02)	3.0 (0.12)	13.0 (0.51)	44.7 (1.76)	58.7 (2.31)	63.0 (2.48)	39.1 (1.54)	36.0 (1.42)	13.2 (0.52)	2.3 (0.09)	0.2 (0.01)	274.1 (10.79)
Average snowfall cm (inches)	21.2 (8.3)	12.7 (5.0)	20.0 (7.9)	5.0 (2.0)	2.9 (1.1)	0.1 (0.0)	0.0 (0.0)	0.0 (0.0)	1.5 (0.6)	6.9 (2.7)	17.7 (7.0)	21.1 (8.3)	109.2 (43.0)
Average precipitation days (≥ 0.2 mm)	9.9	7.8	8.4	7.8	10.5	12.4	10.4	9.2	7.9	6.8	8.5	10.4	110.2
Average rainy days (≥ 0.2 mm)	0.75	0.76	2.3	5.6	10.2	12.4	10.4	9.2	7.7	4.8	1.9	0.69	66.7
Average snowy days (≥ 0.2 cm)	9.8	7.5	7.3	2.9	0.88	0.06	0.0	0.0	0.71	2.5	7.4	10.9	50.1
Mean monthly sunshine hours	106.1	141.4	164.4	229.5	262.6	289.1	331.8	301.2	194.0	168.8	102.0	86.2	2,377
Percentage possible sunshine	40.0	49.9	44.7	55.6	54.9	59.0	67.2	67.0	51.1	50.6	37.5	34.2	51.0
Source: Environment Canada

== Government ==
Moose Jaw City Council consists of an elected mayor and six city councillors. From 1881 to 1903 the community was represented by a Town Council and after that by City Council.

Moose Jaw City Hall, on the 2nd floor at the old Moose Jaw Post Office (c. 1911), has been the council's home since the late 1960s.

Provincially, the city is represented by two MLAs and federally by one MP.

== Neighbourhoods ==
- Caribou Heights
- Churchill Park
- City View
- Crescent View
- Earnscliffe
- Fairview
- Grand View
- Hill Crest
- Iron Bridge
- Kingsway Park
- Lynbrook Heights
- Mooscana
- Morningside
- New Currie
- Palliser Heights
- Parkdale Boulevard
- Pleasant View
- Prairie Heights
- Old 96
- Regal Heights
- River Park
- River View
- Ross Park
- Rothesay Park
- Slater
- Sunningdale
- Sunnyside
- Tapley
- University
- University Heights
- Victoria Heights
- Wellesley Park
- WestHeath
- Westmore
- Westmount
- West Park

These neighbourhoods are divided into four community associations: South Hill, East Side, North West and Sunningdale/VLA/West Park.

== Demographics ==
Historical populations
Year	Pop.	±%
1901	1,558	—
1906	6,249	+301.1%
1911	13,823	+121.2%
1916	16,934	+22.5%
1921	19,285	+13.9%
1926	19,039	−1.3%
1931	21,299	+11.9%
1936	19,805	−7.0%
1941	20,496	+3.5%
1946	23,069	+12.6%
1951	24,355	+5.6%
1956	29,603	+21.5%
1961	33,206	+12.2%
1966	33,417	+0.6%
1971	31,854	−4.7%
1976	32,581	+2.3%
1981	33,941	+4.2%
1986	35,073	+3.3%
1991	33,593	−4.2%
1996	32,973	−1.8%
2001	32,131	−2.6%
2006	32,132	+0.0%
2011	33,274	+3.6%
2016	33,910	+1.9%
2021	33,665	−0.7%
2024 (estimate)	33,519	−0.4%
Statistics Canada

In the 2021 Census of Population conducted by Statistics Canada, Moose Jaw had a population of 33,665 living in 14,719 of its 16,143 total private dwellings, a change of −0.7% from its 2016 population of 33,910. With a land area of 65.81 km^{2} (25.41 sq mi), it had a population density of 511.5/km^{2} (1,324.9/sq mi) in 2021.

Canada census – Moose Jaw community profile

	2021	2011
Population	33,665 (-0.7% from 2016)	33,274 (3.6% from 2006)
Land area	65.81 km^{2} (25.41 sq mi)	50.68 km^{2} (19.57 sq mi)
Population density	511.5/km^{2} (1,325/sq mi)	656.5/km^{2} (1,700/sq mi)
Median age	41.6 (M: 40.0, F: 43.6)
Private dwellings	16,143 (total) 14,719 (occupied)	15,370 (total)
Median household income	$74,000

References: 2021 2011

=== Ethnicity ===
Panethnic groups in the City of Moose Jaw (2001−2021)
Panethnic group	2021		2016		2011		2006		2001	
Panethnic group	Pop.	%	Pop.	%	Pop.	%	Pop.	%	Pop.	%
European (Note: Statistic includes all persons that did not makeup part of a visible minority or an indigenous identity.)	27,110	82.28%	28,400	86.43%	29,405	90.91%	28,590	92.21%	29,130	93.59%
Indigenous	2,355	7.15%	2,100	6.39%	1,390	4.3%	1,530	4.93%	1,355	4.35%
Southeast Asian (Note: Statistic includes total responses of "Filipino" and "Southeast Asian" under visible minority section on census.)	1,210	3.67%	775	2.36%	430	1.33%	100	0.32%	110	0.35%
East Asian (Note: Statistic includes total responses of "Chinese," "Korean," and "Japanese" under visible minority section on the census.)	670	2.03%	540	1.64%	415	1.28%	350	1.13%	250	0.8%
African	660	2%	450	1.37%	355	1.1%	135	0.44%	140	0.45%
South Asian	640	1.94%	340	1.03%	170	0.53%	105	0.34%	85	0.27%
Latin American	130	0.39%	70	0.21%	110	0.34%	50	0.16%	20	0.06%
Middle Eastern (Note: Statistic includes total responses of "West Asian" and "Arab" under visible minority section on census.)	80	0.24%	65	0.2%	15	0.05%	100	0.32%	30	0.1%
Other/multiracial (Note: Statistic includes total responses of "Visible minority, n.i.e." and "Multiple visible minorities" under visible minority section on census.)	95	0.29%	130	0.4%	50	0.15%	40	0.13%	20	0.06%
Total responses	32,950	97.88%	32,860	96.9%	32,345	97.21%	31,005	96.49%	31,125	96.87%
Total population	33,665	100%	33,910	100%	33,274	100%	32,132	100%	32,131	100%
Note: Totals greater than 100% due to multiple origin responses

=== Language ===
Home Language (2021)
Language	Population	Percentage (%)
English	30,930	94%
French	95	0%
Other	1,415	4%

Mother Tongue (2021)
Language	Population	Percentage (%)
English	29,300	89%
French	450	1%
Other	2,605	8%

== Economy ==
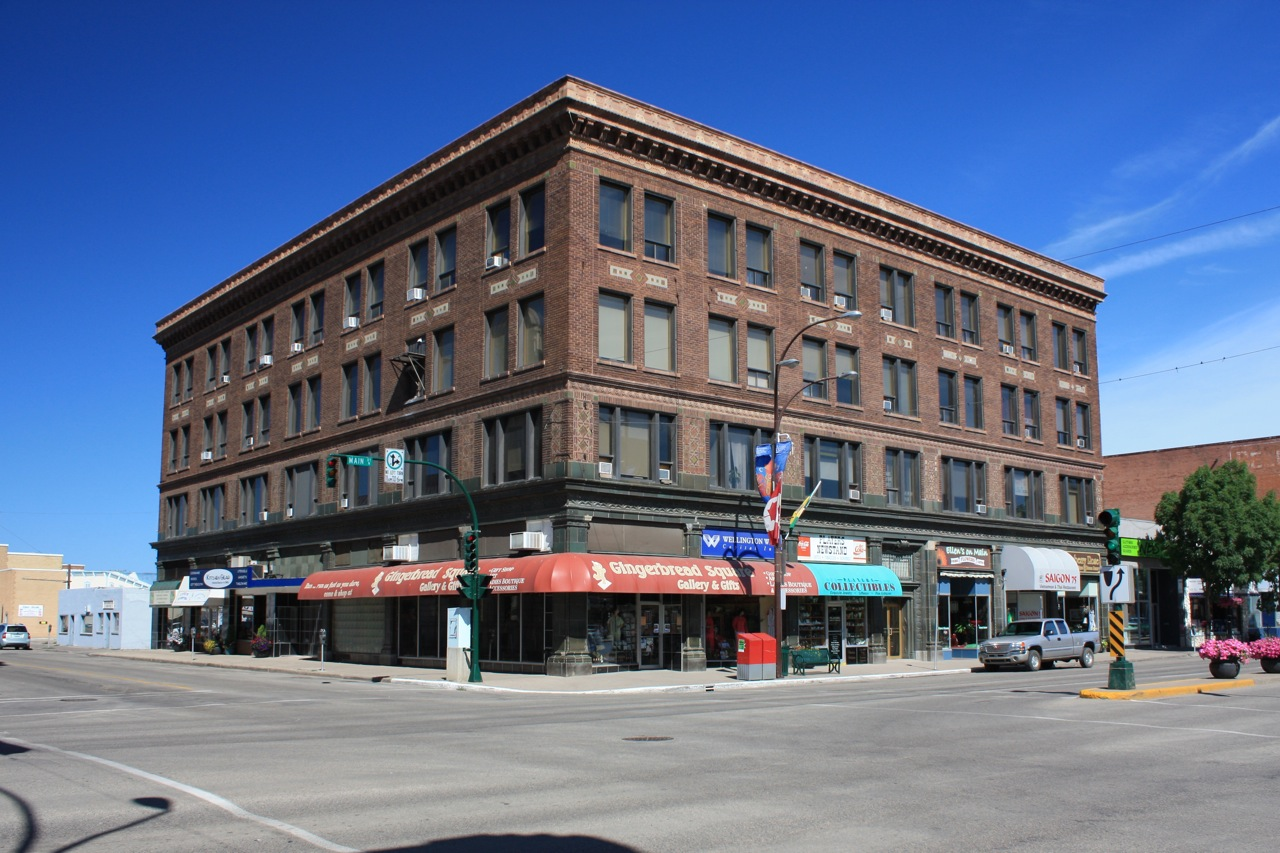
Hammond Building (1912)

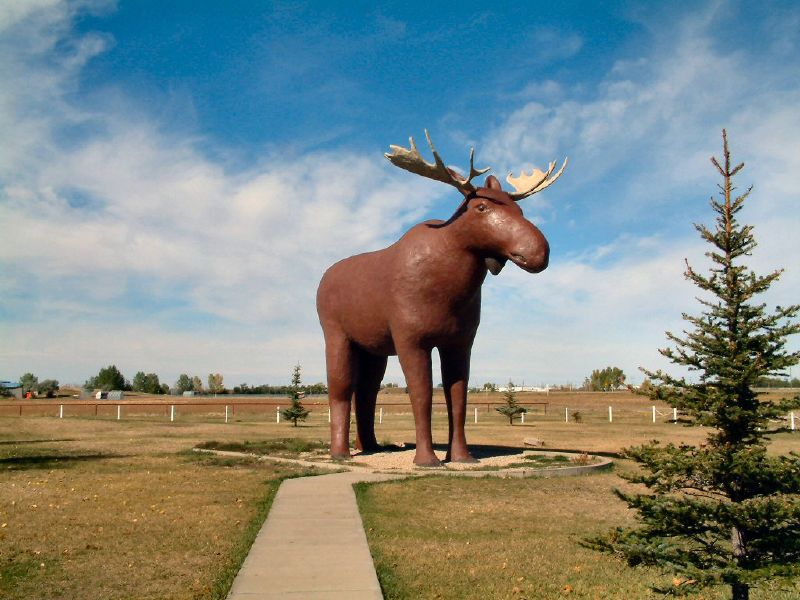
Mac the Moose, a fiberglass moose statue in Moose Jaw

Moose Jaw is a city of 33,000 at the intersection of the Trans Canada Highway and Highway 2. A Snowbird aerobatic jet and Mac the Moose are large roadside attractions on the No. 1 highway at the tourist info center. Moose Jaw Trolley Company (1912) offers trolley tours of Moose Jaw. Temple Garden's Mineral Spa, Tunnels of Moose Jaw, and History of Transportation Western Development Museum. are major sites of interest. The juncture of Moose Jaw and Thunder Creek produced the best source of water for steam engines, and Moose Jaw became the CPR divisional point. Large-capacity concrete grain terminals are replacing the smaller grain elevators that were numerous along the highway, sentinels of most communities along the route. Improved harvest, transport and road construction technology have made the large inland terminals more economically viable. The rural governing body around Moose Jaw is Moose Jaw No. 161, which serves 1,228 residents (2006 census) and includes the Moose Jaw Canadian Forces Base. Meat-processing plants, salt, potash, urea fertilizer, anhydrous ammonia and ethanol producers abound in this area with easy transport access to the Trans–Canada Highway.

In 1917, five local residents banded together to purchase enough automobile parts to build 25 cars. These were to be manufactured under the name Moose Jaw Standard. Each group member received a car, but no further buyers were found, and production did not continue.

== Arts and culture ==
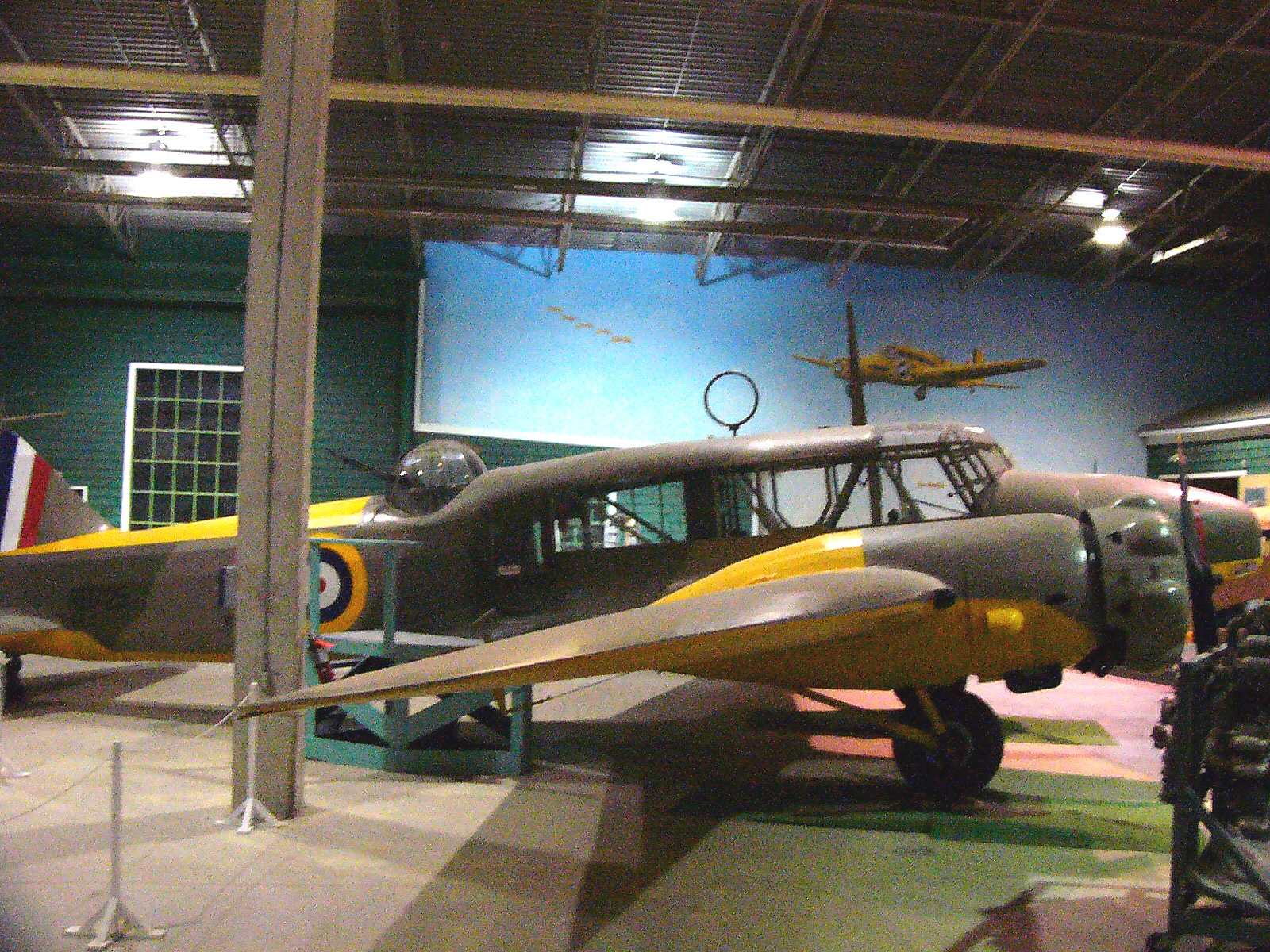
Avro Anson bomber trainer in the city's branch of the WDM museum

=== Visual arts ===
The Moose Jaw Art Guild is a community arts association of local artists dedicated to exhibiting, educating and fostering appreciation for visual arts.

=== Film ===
The city was profiled in Moose Jaw: There's a Future in Our Past, a 1992 documentary essay film by former city resident Rick Hancox.

=== Museums ===
Moose Jaw is home to one of four Saskatchewan Western Development Museums. The Moose Jaw WDM museum specializes in the history of transportation and has a Snowbirds gallery.

The Sukanen Ship Pioneer Village and Museum is south of Moose Jaw on Sk Hwy 2. The car club at Moose Jaw agreed to the restoration of Tom Sukanen's ship at their museum site. Sukanen was a Finnish homesteader who settled near Birsay and hoped to travel home again on a ship he assembled near the South Saskatchewan River. The Sukanen Ship Pioneer Village and Museum features a typical village replete with pioneer artifacts and tractors, cars and trucks restored by the Moose Jaw car club, and is run by volunteers.

The Moose Jaw Museum & Art Gallery is located in Crescent Park at the centre of the downtown area, in the same facility as the Moose Jaw Public Library. The art gallery hosts community exhibits, travelling exhibits, and rotating exhibits from the gallery's permanent collection. The museum also has a heritage gallery, which curates and hosts exhibits on local history, including an upcoming "Pandemic Time Capsule" exhibit scheduled for Spring 2021. The Museum & Art Gallery also hosts classes and events.

=== 2SLGBTQ culture ===
In 1978, Anita Bryant visited Moose Jaw as part of the anti-gay Save Our Children campaign. In response, approximately 85 members of the gay and lesbian community marched down Main St. to Crescent Park, where an estimated 150 people gathered to speak out against Bryant.

In 2008, the Gay and Lesbian Association of Moose Jaw (GLAMJ) requested and was granted the first official proclamation of Pride Week in Moose Jaw and raised the Rainbow Flag over Moose Jaw's City Hall for the first time. The city's first pride parade since 1978 was held in 2015, and similar parades have been held annually in late May or early June, usually from Main Street to Crescent Park.

Moose Jaw Pride was an LGBT community organization incorporated as a non-profit in 2014 until its closing in 2022. Moose Jaw Pride was a founding member of the Saskatchewan Pride Network, started in 2016, which serves to connect and support 2SLGBTQ people in small communities across Saskatchewan, many of which do not have an established local pride organization.

In 2019, Moose Jaw Pride worked with local partners to promote Moose Jaw as a safe and attractive tourism destination for 2SLGBTQ people. 2SLGBTQ tourist attractions included a rainbow-coloured bench on Main Street, in front of the Rainbow Retro Thrift Shop, and a mural on the back of the Rainbow Retro building that depicts events and symbols from local 2SLGBTQ history, including representations of the Anita Bryant march, the Indigenous two-spirit presence in Saskatchewan, the potluck and coffee social events that were central to 2SLGBTQ community development, and several landmark pride flag raisings.

Prism Community Services was launched in 2025 to cover the service gap left after the closure of Moose Jaw Pride.

== Attractions ==
Tourist attractions include the Tunnels of Moose Jaw, The Moose Jaw Trolley, the Temple Gardens Mineral Spa Resort, The Western Development Museum, Casino Moose Jaw, Moose Jaw Museum and Art Gallery, Yvette Moore Art Gallery, the Murals of Moose Jaw, and the historic downtown. Every July, the four-day Saskatchewan Festival of Words showcases top Canadian writers from a wide variety of genres. The free three-day Sidewalk Days Festival draws tens of thousands to Main Street the weekend after Canada Day. The Snowbirds flight demonstration team is based at CFB Moose Jaw, south of Moose Jaw in Bushell Park, where the now defunct airshow was performed every summer. It will be brought back in 2019.

Moose Jaw has many parks. Crescent Park is located in downtown. It features a creek, picnic tables, a library, an art museum, a playground, an outdoor swimming pool, water park, a tennis court, lawn bowling field and an amphitheatre. Casino Moose Jaw and Temple Gardens Mineral Spa are across Fairford St. E. and 1st Ave. NE. from Crescent Park. "Wakamow Valley" follows the Moose Jaw River and features both natural and maintained areas. There are many trails throughout the park for hiking and cycling, including picnic tables, barbecues, and four playgrounds. There is also an RV park, Lorne Calvert Campground, formerly known as River Park Campground, which was founded in 1927 and is the longest-running campground in North America. Canoe and kayak rentals are available across the road from the campground. The Moose Jaw Canoe and Kayak Club has been around since the late '90s and is inside the campground.

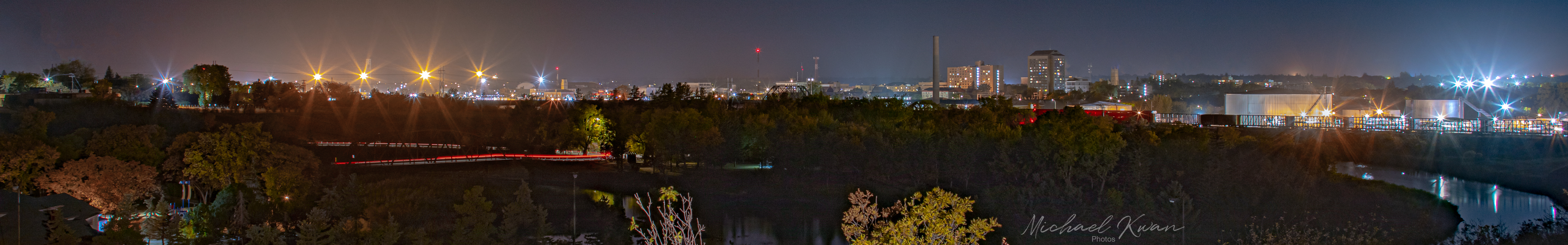
Skyline of Moose Jaw from Chateau St. Michaels Retirement Home, overlooking Wakamow Valley Park

Old Wives Lake, a saline lake is 30 km southwest of the city on Highway 363. Buffalo Pound Lake a eutrophic prairie lake is 28 km north on Highway 2. Buffalo Pound Provincial Park is on the south shore and can be accessed by Highway 202 and Highway 301.

=== Tunnels of Moose Jaw ===
The tunnels present two tour attractions: Passage to Fortune and The Chicago Connection. While Passage to Fortune is construed by many visitors to be historically accurate, there is no evidence to suggest that Chinese Canadians lived in the tunnels of the tours outside of minimal anecdotal testimonies. Historically accurate information such as the Chinese Exclusion Act, Chinese Head Tax and the case of Quong Wing v R which occurred at the site of 1 Main street across the location of the tunnels are mentioned throughout the tour. However, Passage to Fortune also circulates misinformation about Chinese Canadians in Moose Jaw. Moose Jaw Tour attendees are called "Coolies" at an early stage of the tour. Tour attendees are then guided through the tunnels from the position of Chinese workers indentured to the fictional laundry owner Mr. Burrows who were forced to live underground. In actuality, early Chinese Canadians were often proprietors of their own laundries, a labour-intensive industry many found themselves in due to prejudice barring them from entering other industries. In 1890, the first Chinese business opened in Moose Jaw, was a Chinese laundry. in 1908, nine laundries can be found in the City directory, with eight businesses notably Chinese-run.

The tunnels became a hub of renewed activity in the 1920s for rum-running during Prohibition in the United States. They were reported to have warehoused illegal alcohol that was shipped to the U.S. via the Soo Line Railroad. The tunnels were also used for gambling and prostitution, all without interference from the corrupt police. There has long been anecdotal evidence that American mobster Al Capone visited Moose Jaw or had interests in the bootlegging operations. No written or photographic proof exists of Capone's presence, but several firsthand accounts from Moose Javians who claim to have met him have been documented. Capone's grandniece also confirmed he had been in Moose Jaw before his 1931 conviction for tax evasion. In the 21st century, the city capitalized on this notoriety to restore the tunnel network into the Tunnels of Moose Jaw, a tourist attraction that opened in June 2000. The Royal Canadian Mounted Police, however, states that there is no "evidence that he ever set foot on Canadian soil."

== Sports and recreation ==
As in most Canadian cities, hockey has played a large part in Moose Jaw's sporting culture. Baseball has also been essential to Moose Jaw since its early days; the city won the territorial championship in 1895. Most recently, the 2004 Junior All-Star team (age 13/14) won the Canadian Championship and became the first team from Saskatchewan to win a game at the Little League World Series.

Notable Moose Jaw teams include:

- Moose Jaw Warriors, Western Hockey League team
- Moose Jaw Storm, Division 2 Soccer team
- Moose Jaw Miller Express, Western Major Baseball League team
- Moose Jaw Mustangs, Prairie Gold Lacrosse League team
- Moose Jaw Rotary Track Club, Track and Field and cross country club
- Lil Chicago Roller Derby's Moose Jaw Jaw Breakers – Women's Flat Track Roller Derby
- Moose Jaw Mafia, Prairie Gold Lacrosse League Senior team

Defunct sports teams

- Moose Jaw Robin Hoods, senior hockey team and Western Canada League baseball team (1909–1921)
- Moose Jaw Maple Leafs, senior hockey team (1919–1923)
- Moose Jaw Maroons, Prairie Hockey League team (1926–1928)
- Moose Jaw Canucks, Saskatchewan Junior Hockey League team (1935–1984)
- Moose Jaw Generals, senior hockey team, winner of the Hardy Cup in 1985
- Moose Jaw Diamond Dogs, Prairie League baseball team (1995–1997)
- Moose Jaw Millers, Saskatchewan Rugby Football Union (Canadian football) team (? – c. 1941)

Sports events held by Moose Jaw include:

- 2023 World Para Ice Hockey Championships
- 2025 World Men's Curling Championship

Moose Jaw is also home to two curling clubs, the Moose Jaw Curling Centre and the Temple Gardens Centre.

== Education ==
Local institutions include five high schools and 15 elementary schools. The schools are in the Prairie South School Division and the Holy Trinity Catholic Schools.

École Ducharme offers preschool to grade 12 and is Moose Jaw's only Francophone school. École fransaskoise de Moose Jaw offers French Immersion from preschool to grade 9.

Moose Jaw is also home to a campus of Saskatchewan Polytechnic.

== Infrastructure ==
=== Health care ===
Moose Jaw Union Hospital was the primary health care provider for the city since 1948, but closed in 2015 and was replaced by Dr. F.H. Wigmore Regional Hospital in the city's northeast end. The new location was partly picked for its proximity to the Trans-Canada Highway. The Wigmore Hospital uses LEAN methodology to save time and money in healthcare.

=== Security ===
The Moose Jaw Fire Department (est. 1906) is a 57-member fire and rescue service that provides fire suppression to the city and CFB Moose Jaw. It has two stations, North Hill Fire Station (Headquarters) and South Hill Fire Station. It is also contracted out to CFB Moose Jaw to provide structural fire suppression services.

Ambulatory (EMS) services are provided by Five Hills Health Region, which operates an EMS station in Moose Jaw; non-emergency services are provided by St. John Ambulance.

The Moose Jaw Police Service, with 54 sworn members, provides policing for the city and holds both municipal and provincial jurisdiction in partnership with the Royal Canadian Mounted Police.

=== Transportation ===
Moose Jaw Transit
- Founded: 1957
- Headquarters: 1010 High Street West
- Locale: Moose Jaw, Saskatchewan
- Service area: urban area
- Service type: bus service
- Fleet: 7
- Website: Transit Division

Moose Jaw Transit provides local bus service to urban areas of the city. This small system operates four routes from a downtown hub on weekdays between 7:15 am and 6:15 pm. Fixed Route Service | City of Moose Jaw

The bus fleet was replaced in 2008 by new low-floor accessible vehicles under the federal government's one-time public transit capital funding program.

Moose Jaw Municipal Airport is 7 nautical miles (13 kilometres; 8.1 miles) east-northeast of Moose Jaw. CFB Moose Jaw's airfield is also used by civilian aircraft, with civilian operations at the base referring to the facility as Moose Jaw/Air Vice Marshal C.M. McEwen Airport.

Moose Jaw has four photo radar cameras, including two which operate on the TransCanada Highway passing through the city.

== Media ==
Print

- Moose Jaw Express, with two publications—a local weekly newspaper and a weekend edition

Radio

- 800 AM – CHAB, oldies (800 CHAB), Golden West Broadcasting
- 100.7 FM – CILG-FM, country music (Country 100), Golden West Broadcasting
- 103.9 FM – CJAW-FM, adult contemporary (Mix 103), Golden West Broadcasting
- Moose Jaw's Rock Station the Buzz, The Buzz Digital Radio Network, Digital Radio Broadcaster, Active Rock, (TheBuzzRocks.ca), Pearl Creek Media

Television

- SNN: Moose Jaw, Saskatchewan News Network Digital TV Broadcaster, Local & Provincial News, (SaskNews.net), Pearl Creek Media
- The only terrestrial broadcast television station local to Moose Jaw is CKMJ-TV channel 7, an analogue repeater of CTV station CKCK-DT Regina. Moose Jaw was previously served by CHAB-TV, a television station that existed from 1959 to 1969. Digital terrestrial TV is available over the air from Regina, Saskatchewan
- In the series pilot for Due South, it is revealed that the character Benton Fraser once worked in Moose Jaw.
- In the animated series Atomic Betty, this city is where it is set under the name "Moose Jaw Heights."
- In the series Corner Gas, S5 E14 ("Contagious Fortune"), in an attempt to cover over up his pink eye, Brent claims to have swum at the Moose Jaw swimming pool.
- In the series Bones, Booth and Brennan go undercover in a number of episodes. In a few of these episodes, their names are Buck and Wanda Moosejaw, who are a Canadian husband and wife. Their surname is a nod to Canada.
- In the series A League of Their Own, Rockford Peaches shortstop Jess McCready is from Moose Jaw, and several references are made to the character being Canadian throughout the series.

Film

- In the musical The Apple, the main characters Alphie and Bibi are originally from Moose Jaw.

Music

- On Roger Waters's Radio K.A.O.S, the lyrics for the song "Home" mention Moose Jaw as a possible home.

== Notable people ==
- Siera Bearchell, Miss Universe Canada 2016, Born and raised in Moose Jaw
- Randy Black, former drummer for Primal Fear and Annihilator
- Mike Blaisdell, former National Hockey League player
- Lorne Calvert, Premier of Saskatchewan (2001–2007)
- Earl Cameron (broadcaster)
- Roger Carter, former Dean of the University of Saskatchewan College of Law; born in Moose Jaw.
- Dana Claxton (filmmaker, photographer, performance artist)
- Ben Coakwell, Canadian Olympic bobsledder
- Burton Cummings, musician
- Bill Davies, former MLA for Moose Jaw, member of the Order of Canada
- Scott Deibert, former Canadian football player
- Phyllis Dewar, Olympic swimmer
- Ken Doraty, former National Hockey League player
- Emile Francis, former National Hockey League player and coach
- Lisa Franks, Paralympic athlete
- Clark Gillies, former National Hockey League player
- Peter Gzowski resided in Moose Jaw in 1957
- Adam Hadwin, professional golfer
- Ken Kelly, Paralympic athlete and silver medal winner (1996 Atlanta Games)
- Roy Kiyooka, Canadian Poet
- Bill Lesuk, played in the NHL for the Boston Bruins, Philadelphia Flyers, Los Angeles Kings, Washington Capitals, and in the WHA with the Winnipeg Jets
- Art Linkletter, radio and television host of Art Linkletter's House Party
- Reed Low, former National Hockey League player
- Bud McCaig, co-owner of the Calgary Flames
- Mike Mintenko, Olympic swimmer
- David Mitchell, National Lacrosse League player
- Ken Mitchell, author, member of the Order of Canada
- Scott Munroe, American Hockey League player
- Fergie Olver, Toronto Blue Jays broadcaster
- Jack Reddick, Canadian Light Heavyweight Champion boxer
- Chico Resch, former National Hockey League goalie
- Arthur Slade, Governor General's Award-winning author
- Doug Smail, former National Hockey League player
- Levi Steinhauer, CFL player
- George Swarbrick, former National Hockey League player
- Ross Thatcher, former Premier Province of Saskatchewan (1964–1971).
- Geoffrey Ursell, writer
- Glen Sonmor, former NHL coach.
- Brian Towriss, former U Sports Head Coach Men's Football at the University of Saskatchewan

== See also ==
- Monarchy in Saskatchewan
- Wakamow Valley Authority
