= Saskatoon =

Largest city in Saskatchewan, Canada

- City
- City of Saskatoon
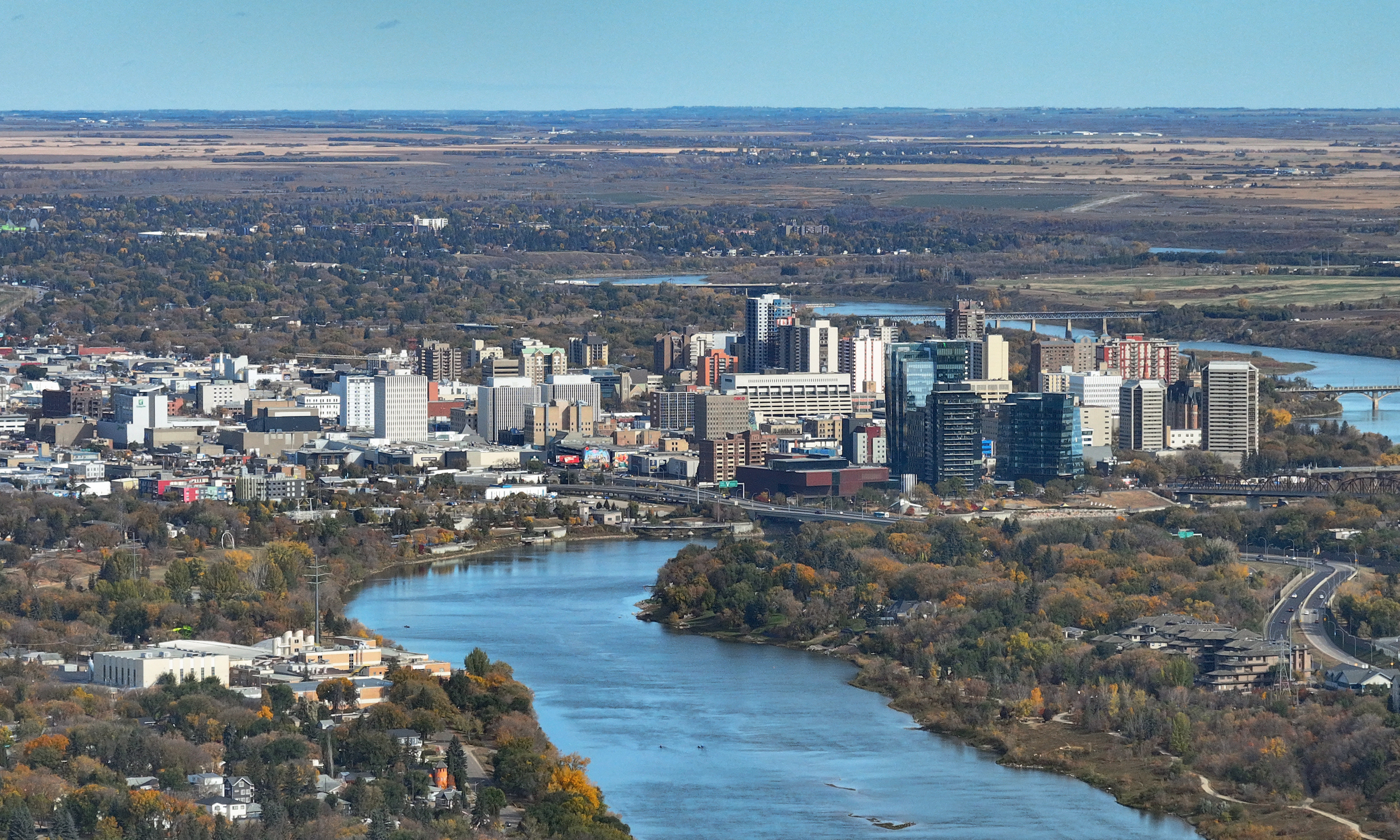
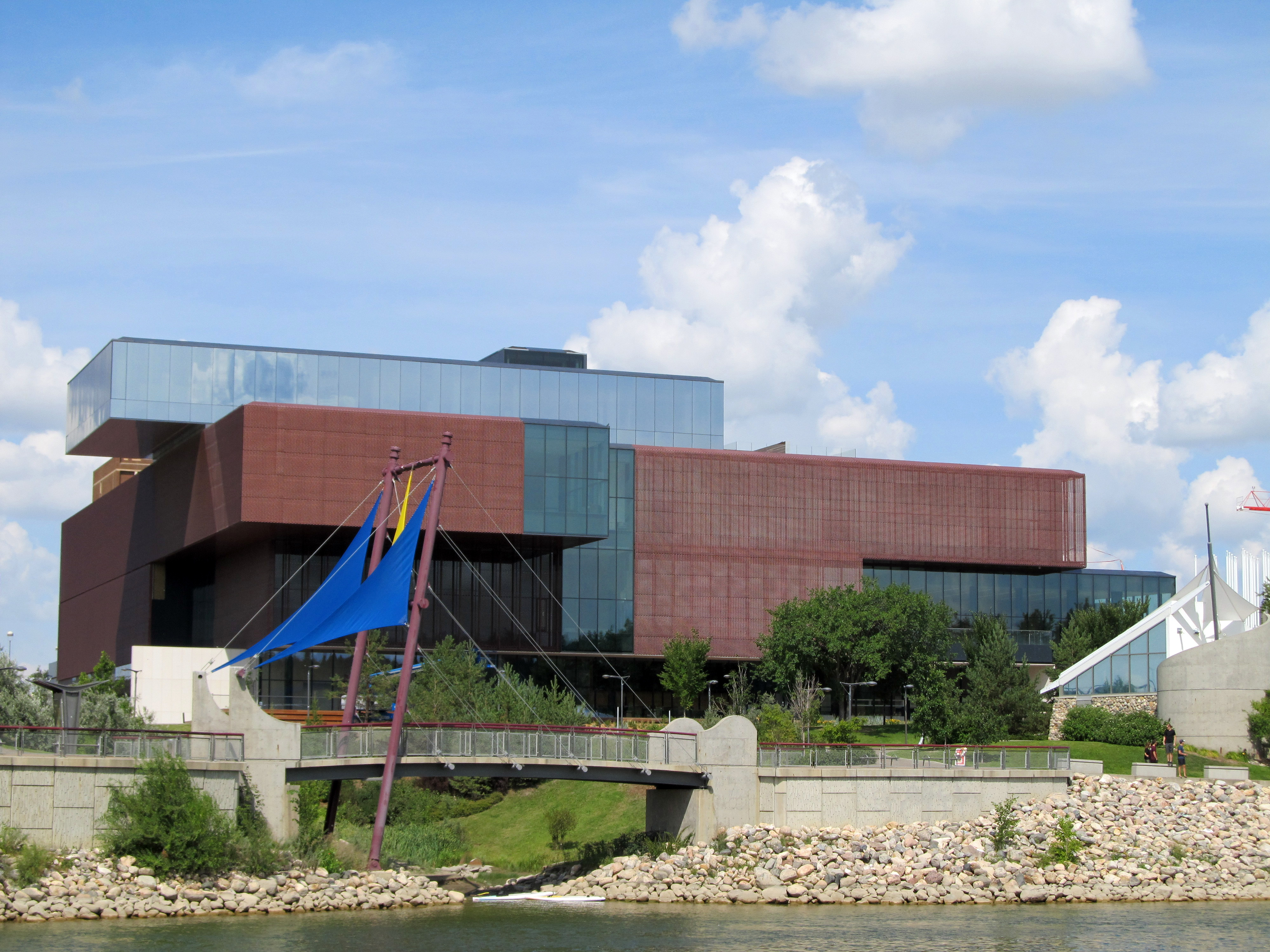
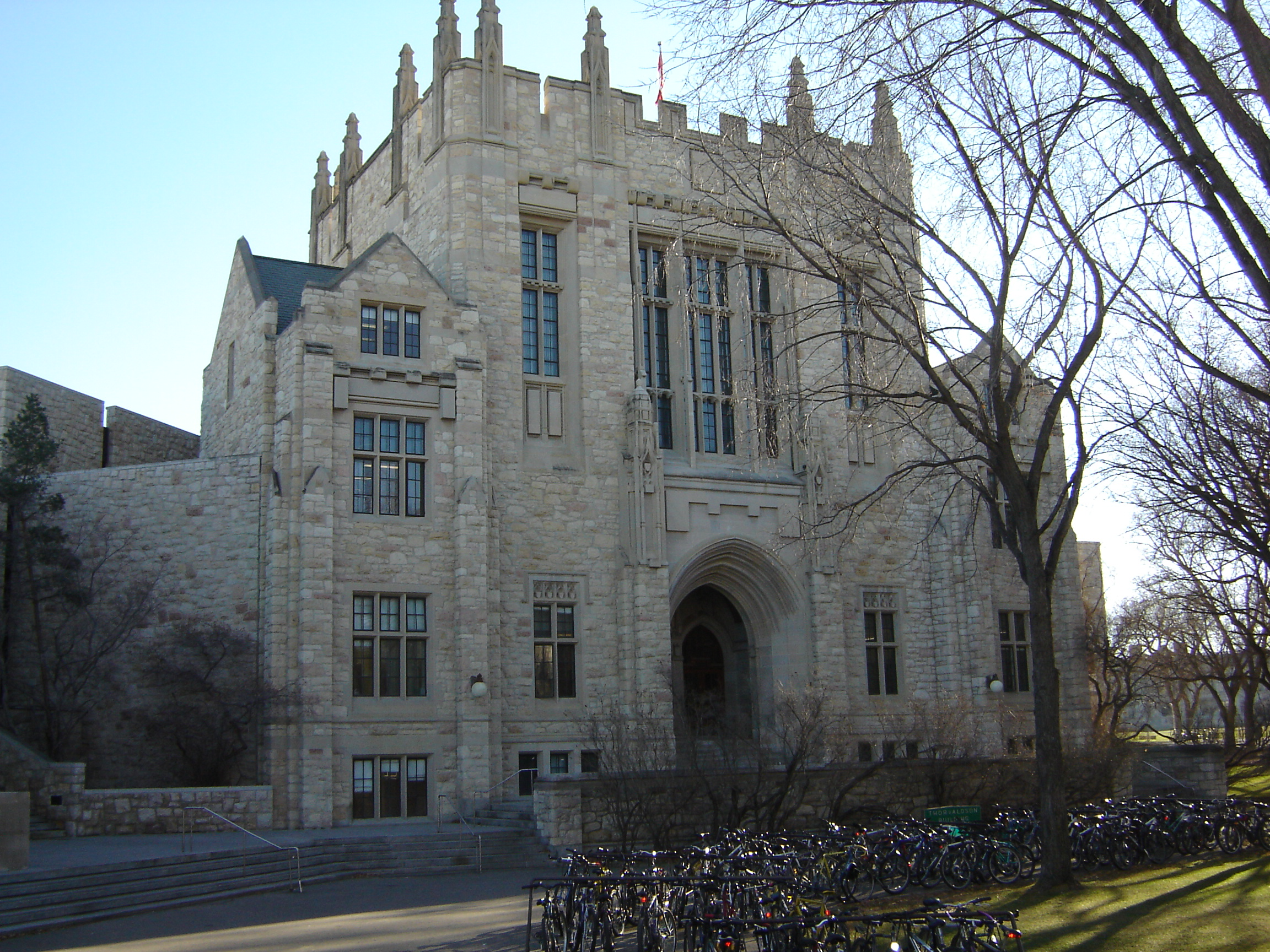
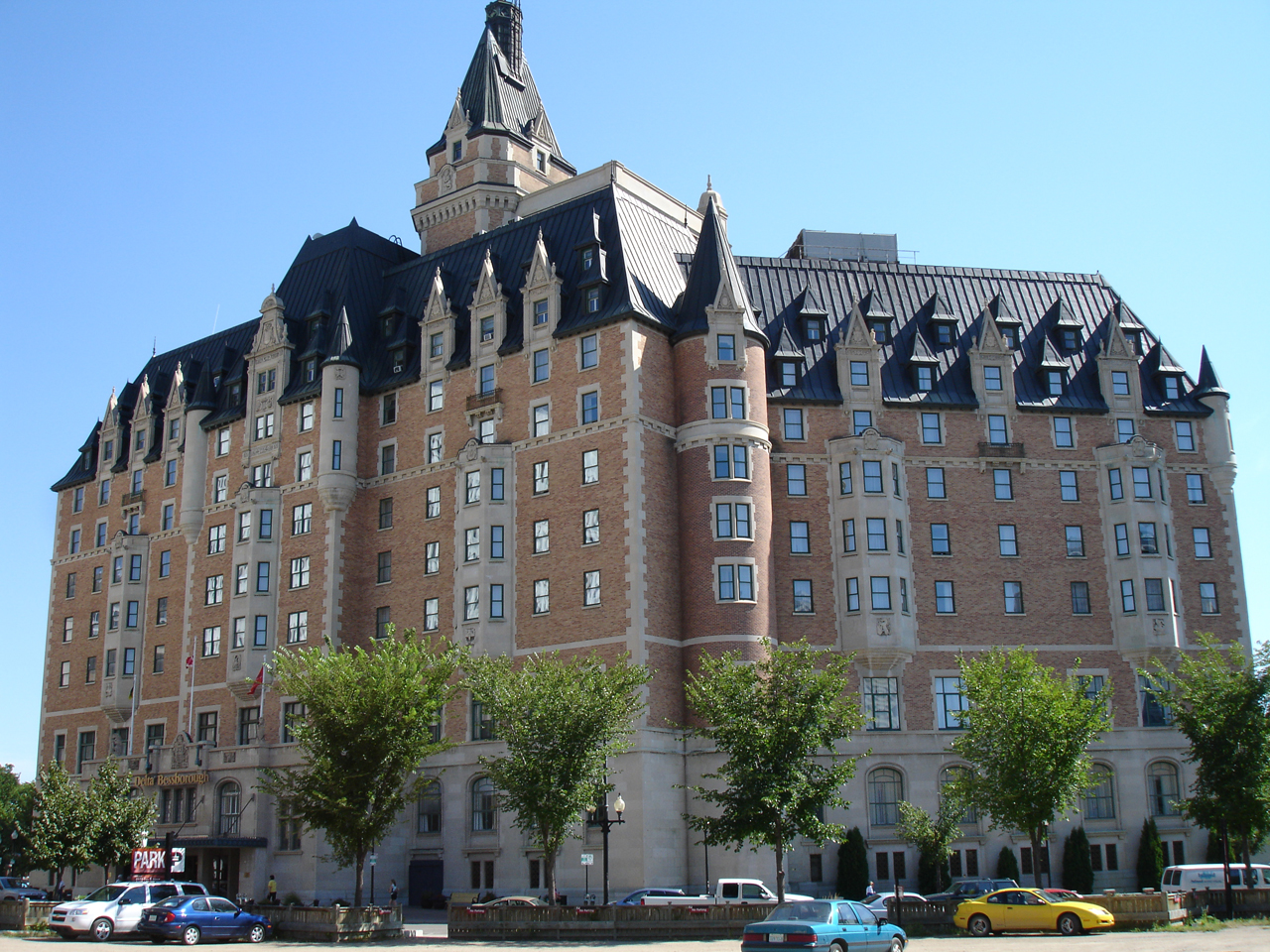
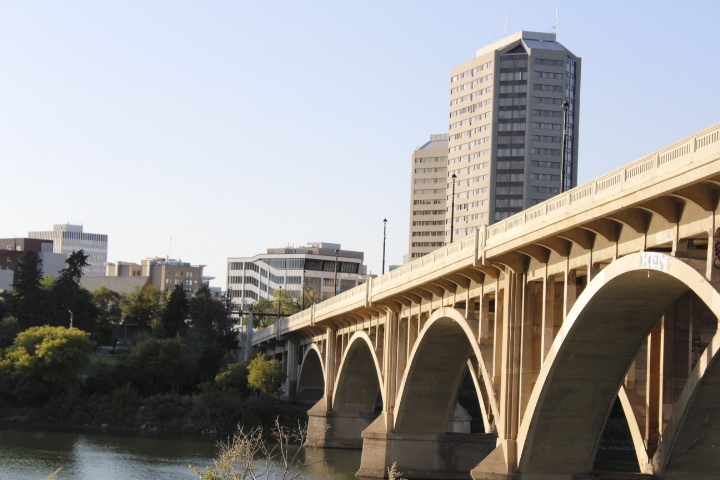
- Downtown Remai Modern University of Saskatchewan Delta Bessborough hotel Broadway Bridge

- Flag Coat of arms Logo
- Nicknames: "Paris of the Prairies", "Toontown", "S'toon", "Hub City", "POW City" (for potash, oil and wheat), "The City of Bridges", "YXE", "Saskabush"
- Location of Saskatoon in Canada Saskatoon (Saskatchewan)
- Coordinates: 52°08′23″N 106°41′10″W
- Country: Canada
- Province: Saskatchewan
- Establishment: 1883
- Incorporation: 1906

Government
  - Mayor: Cynthia Block
  - Governing body: Saskatoon City Council
  - MP: List of MPs: Brad Redekopp (CPC); Corey Tochor (CPC); Kevin Waugh (CPC)
  - MLAs: List of MLAs: Kim Breckner (NDP); Ken Cheveldayoff (SKP); April ChiefCalf (NDP); Hugh Gordon (NDP); Tajinder Grewal (NDP); Keith Jorgenson (NDP); Matt Love (NDP); Jamie Martens (SKP); Don McBean (NDP); Vicki Mowat (NDP); Betty Nippi-Albright (NDP); Erika Ritchie (NDP); Brittney Senger (NDP); Nathaniel Teed (NDP); Darcy Warrington (NDP)

Area
  - Land: 226.56 km^{2} (87.48 sq mi)
  - Metro: 5,864.48 km^{2} (2,264.29 sq mi)
- Elevation: 481.5 m (1,580 ft)

Population (2021)
  - City: 266,141 (19th)
  - Density: 1,174.7/km^{2} (3,042/sq mi)
  - Metro: 317,480 (17th)
  - Metro density: 54.1/km^{2} (140/sq mi)
- Demonym: Saskatonian
- Time zone: UTC– 06:00 (CST)
- Forward sortation area: S7A – S7C, S7H – S7W
- Area codes: 306, 639, 474
- Pronunciation: /ˌsæskəˈtuːn/
- GDP (Saskatoon CMA): CA$20.2 billion (2020)
- GDP per capita (Saskatoon CMA): CA$64,447 (2016)
- Website: saskatoon.ca

Saskatoon (/ˌsæskəˈtuːn/) is the largest city in the Canadian province of Saskatchewan. It straddles a bend in the South Saskatchewan River in the central region of the province. It is located along the Trans-Canada Yellowhead Highway; since its founding in 1882 as a Temperance colony, it has served as the cultural and economic hub of central Saskatchewan.

With a 2021 census population of 266,141, Saskatoon is the largest city in Saskatchewan, and the 17th largest Census Metropolitan Area in Canada, with a 2021 census population of 317,480.

Saskatoon is home to the University of Saskatchewan, the Meewasin Valley Authority—which protects the South Saskatchewan River and provides for the city's popular riverbank park spaces—and Wanuskewin Heritage Park, a National Historic Site of Canada and UNESCO World Heritage applicant representing 6,000 years of First Nations history. The Rural Municipality of Corman Park No. 344, the most populous rural municipality in Saskatchewan, surrounds the city and contains many of the developments associated with it, including Wanuskewin. Saskatoon is named after the saskatoon berry, which is native to the region and is itself derived from the Cree misâskwatômina. The city has a significant Indigenous population and several urban Reserves. The city has nine river crossings and is nicknamed the "Paris of the Prairies" and "The City of Bridges".

Historic neighbourhoods of Saskatoon include Nutana, Riversdale, and Sutherland which were separate towns before amalgamating with the town of Saskatoon and incorporating it as a city in 1906. Nutana, Riversdale, their historic main streets of Broadway Avenue and 20th Street, as well as the downtown core and other central neighbourhoods are seeing significant reinvestment and redevelopment. Sutherland was a rail town beyond the University of Saskatchewan lands, annexed by the city in 1956.

== Etymology ==
The name "Saskatoon" (in Cree: sâskwatôn ᓵᐢᑿᑑᐣ, "Sæske'tune", "Saskatoon", or the locatives: misâskwatôminihk ᒥᓵᐢᑿᑑᒥᓂᕽ, lit: "at the saskatoon berry", misâskwatôminiskâhk ᒥᓵᐢᑿᑑᒥᓂᐢᑳᕽ, "at the place of many saskatoon berries", mînisihk ᒦᓂᓯᕽ "at the berry") comes from the Cree inanimate noun misâskwatômina ᒥᓵᐢᑿᑑᒥᓇ "saskatoon berries", which refers to the sweet, violet-coloured serviceberry that grows in the area. However, the exact origin of the naming of the settlement is unclear. Founder John Neilson Lake apparently told multiple stories, including the most famous, where in August 1883 he was handed a handful of berries, told their name, and exclaimed, "Arise Saskatoon, Queen of the North!". It is considered most likely that the name in fact derived from one already in use: manemesaskwatan, or "the place where willows are cut", referring to the Cree practice of cutting saskatoon berry willows for arrow shafts.

== History ==
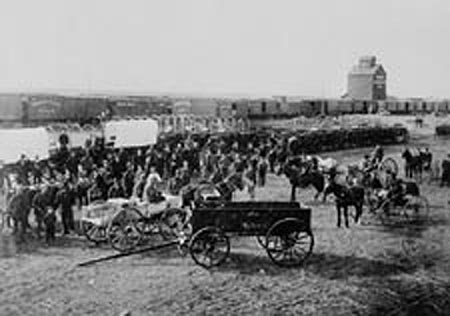
Barr Colonists in Saskatoon in 1903. The settlement of Saskatoon saw an economic boom when the travelling Barr Colonists encamped around the community.

In 1882, the Toronto-based Temperance Colonization Society was granted 21 sections of land straddling the South Saskatchewan River, between what is now Warman and Dundurn. The aim of the group was to escape the liquor trade in Toronto and set up a "dry" community in the Prairie region. The following year settlers, led by John Neilson Lake, arrived on the site of what is now "Saskatoon" and established the first permanent settlement. The settlers travelled by railway from Ontario to Moose Jaw and then completed the final leg via horse-drawn cart, as the railway had yet to be completed to Saskatoon.

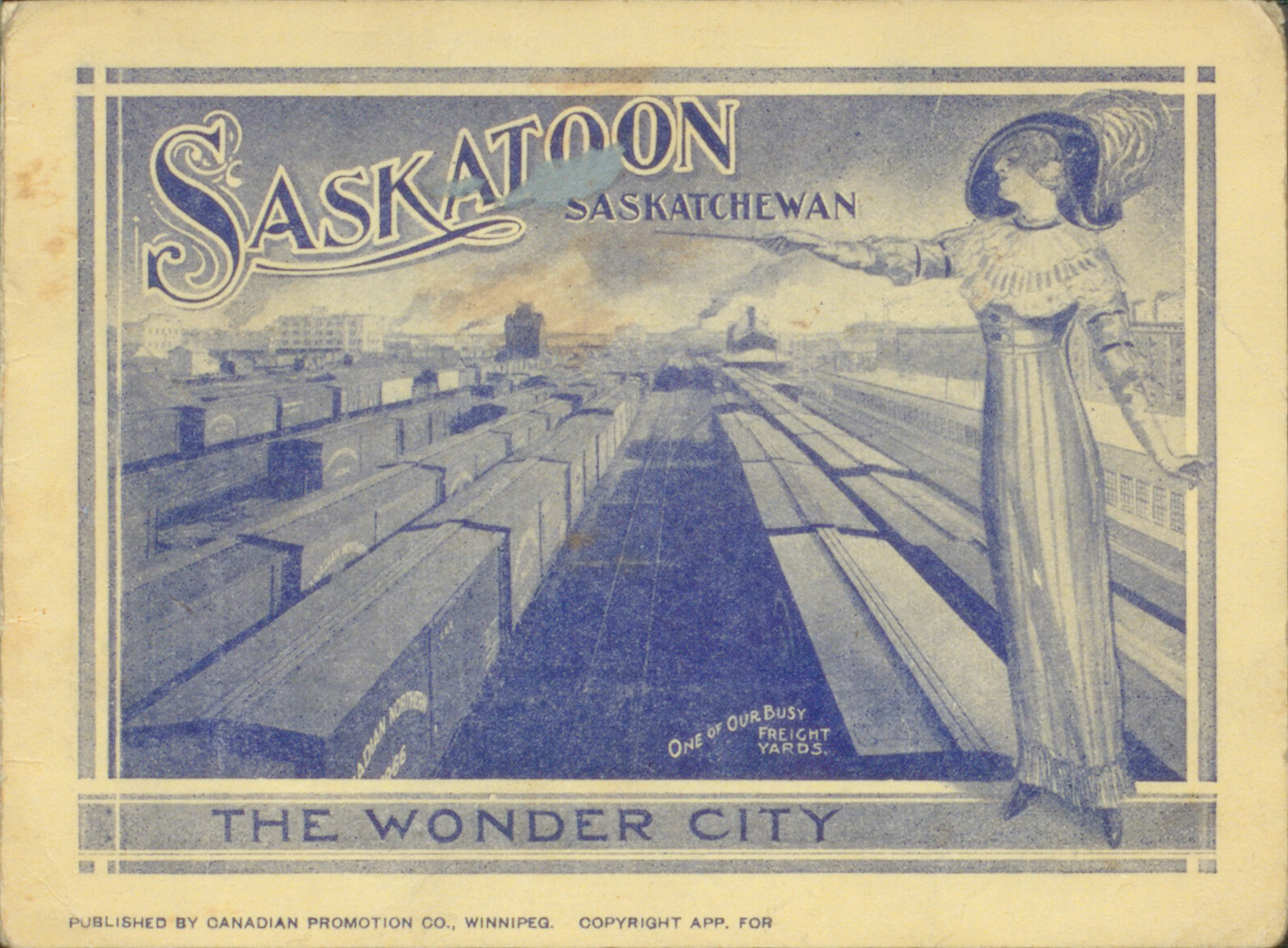
Small booklet depicting a woman standing over a busy train yard in Saskatoon (Source: https://archive.org/details/prairiepromisespostcard_109)

In 1885, the North-West Rebellion affected the tiny community in a variety of ways. Chief Whitecap and Charles Trottier passed through the present day University campus on their way to join Louis Riel's armed forces at Batoche, Saskatchewan. Following the fighting at the Battle of Fish Creek, and the Battle of Batoche, wounded Canadian soldiers convalesced at the Marr Residence which is today a historic site. A few died in care and were buried in the Pioneer Cemetery near the Exhibition Grounds.

A town charter for the west side of the river was obtained in 1903, and this settlement adopted the name Saskatoon; the original townsite, which became a village that year, was renamed Nutana. In 1906, Saskatoon became a city with a population of 4,500, which included the communities of Saskatoon, Riversdale and Nutana. In 1955, a newly established community west of the city, Montgomery Place, was annexed, followed by the neighbouring town of Sutherland in 1956. Saskatoon serves as a regional centre for the northern prairies and for central and northern Saskatchewan.

== Geography ==
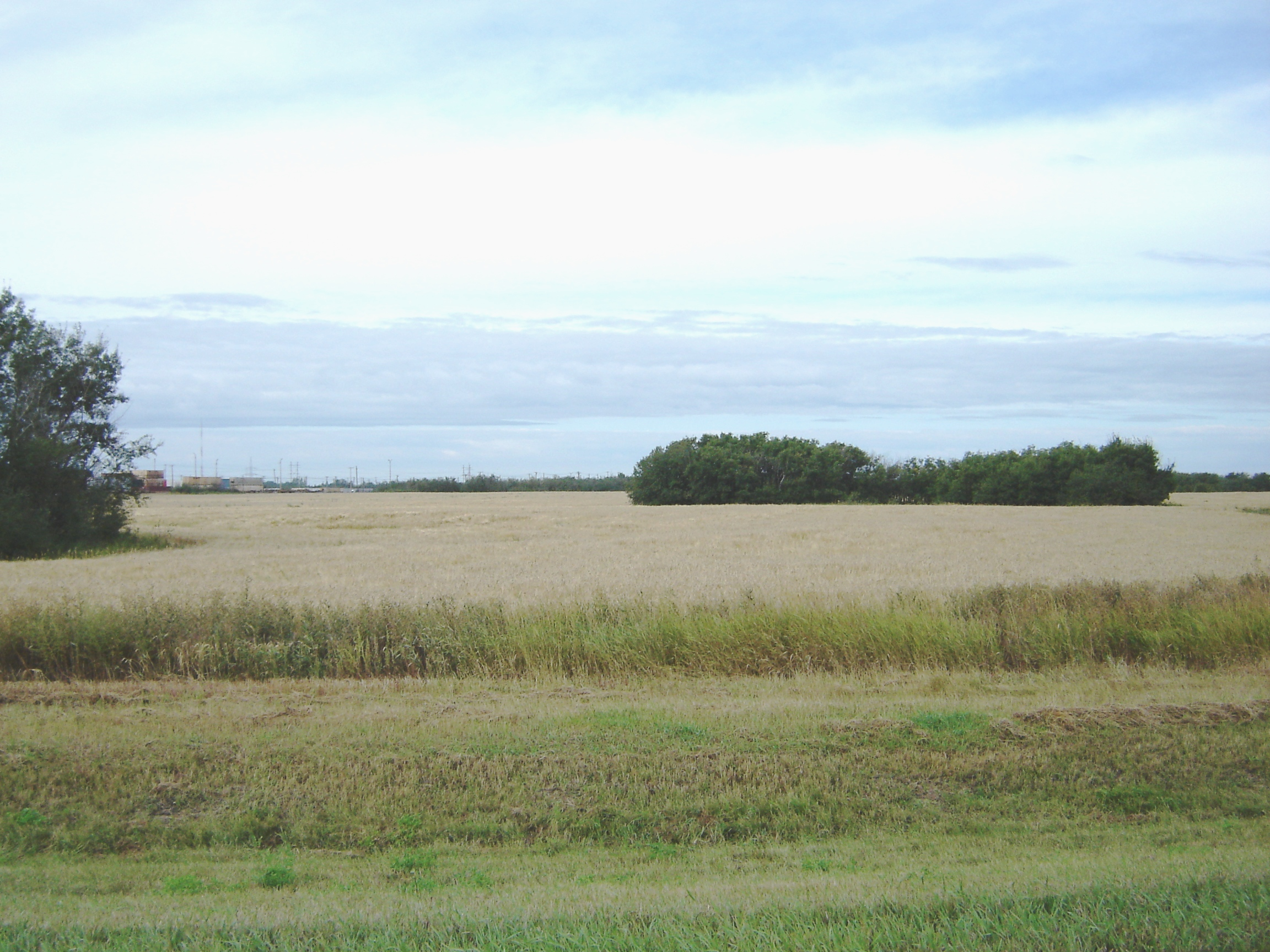
View of the Aspen parkland outside the city limits. The area is a transitional biome between the boreal forest and prairies.

Saskatoon lies on a long belt of rich, potassic chernozem in middle-southern Saskatchewan, northwest of Regina, northeast of Calgary, and east of Edmonton, and is found in the aspen parkland biome. The lack of surrounding mountainous topography gives the city a relatively flat grid, though the city does sprawl over a few hills and into a few valleys. The lowest point in the city is the river, while the highest point is in the Sutherland-College Park area. Saskatoon, on a cross-section from west to east, has a general decline in elevation above sea level heading towards the river, and on the east bank of the river, the terrain is mostly level until outside the city, where it begins to decrease in elevation again.

Saskatoon is divided into east and west sides by the South Saskatchewan River. It is then divided into Suburban Development Areas (SDA) which are composed of neighbourhoods. Street addresses are demarcated into north and south (for avenues aligned in those directions) and similar east and west (for streets aligned in those directions). West of the river, the demarcation line for north and south addresses is 22nd Street, while east and west are divided by Idylwyld Drive (north of 20th Street) and Avenue A (south of 20th). On the east side, in order to line up with 22nd/Idylwyld, Lorne Avenue demarcates east and west while Aird Street, a minor residential road, marks the north–south boundary, except in the Sutherland community where a separate east/west demarcation takes place with Central Avenue as the boundary (there is, however, no separate north–south divide). As a result of the unusual demarcation on the east side, few streets there actually carry a "North" or "West" designation, and only a few streets in Sutherland are demarcated "East" and "West".

A second major water feature aside from the river is the Hudson Bay Slough, a remnant of a glacier-formed body of water that at one time dominated the northern end of the city. Industrial development has resulted in most of the slough being drained, however a large remnant has been preserved off Avenue C as part of RCAF Memorial Park, and another portion remains intact within the Hudson Bay Industrial area. Several residential communities also feature "man-made lakes", with Lakeview (developed from the early 1980s) being the first.

Pike Lake and Blackstrap Provincial Parks are both approximately 40 kilometres (25 mi) south of the city on Highway 60 and Highway 11, respectively. Batoche, a national historic site associated with the North-West Rebellion of 1885, is 90 km (56 mi) north of the city. Both Blackstrap and Batoche are popular destinations for school field trips.

=== Climate ===
Saskatoon experiences a borderline cold semi-arid climate (Köppen: BSk) to humid continental climate (Dfb), with typically warm summers and long, cold winters. Climate data from the University of Saskatchewan, in the inner city meets semi-arid criteria. This is due to slightly higher average annual temperature and slightly lower average annual precipitation than the Airport, on the city's northwest periphery.

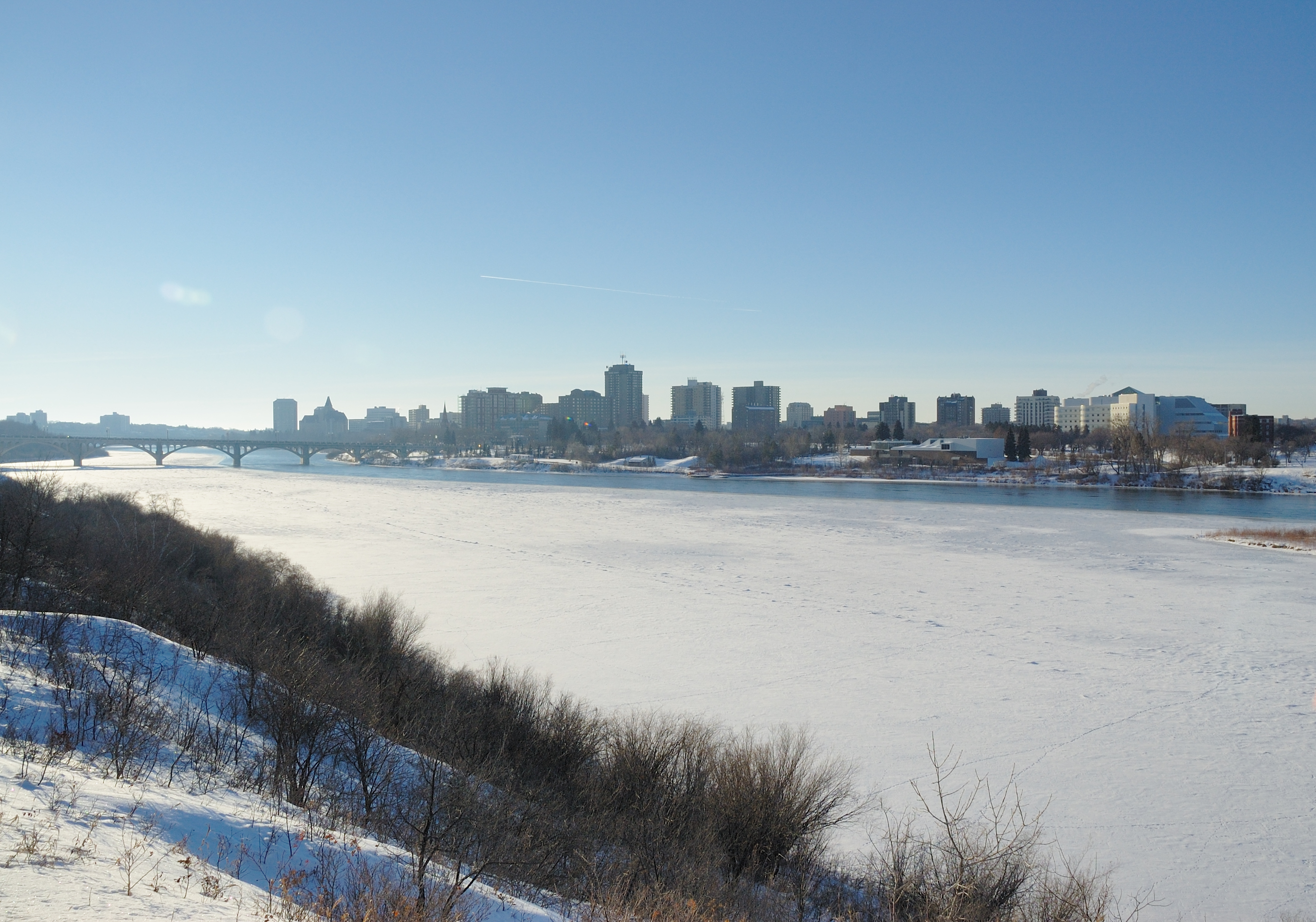
Winter skyline of Saskatoon with the South Saskatchewan River bisecting the city. Winters in the city are long and cold.

The city has four distinct seasons and is in plant hardiness zone 3b. Saskatoon has a dry climate and sees 352.3 millimetres (13.87 in) of precipitation per year on average, with the summer being the wettest season. Saskatoon is sunnier than average in Canada as a result, averaging 2,350.4 hours of bright sunshine annually. The extreme temperatures are typically accompanied by below average levels of humidity. Thunderstorms are common in the summer months and can be severe with torrential rain, hail, high winds, intense lightning and, on occasion, tornadoes. The frost-free growing season lasts from May 21 to September 15, but due to Saskatoon's northerly location, damaging frosts have occurred as late as June 14 and again as early as August. The average daytime high temperature peaks at 25.8 °C (78.4 °F) from July 31 to August 8.

The "Blizzard of 2007" was described by many residents as the worst they had seen and paralyzed the city with its low visibility, extreme cold and large volume of snow. Winds rose to over 90 kilometres per hour (56 mph) and an estimated 25 centimetres (9.8 in) of snow fell throughout the day. Many area residents took refuge overnight at area work places, shopping centres, hospitals and the university.

The highest temperature ever recorded in Saskatoon was 41.5 °C (106.7 °F) on June 6, 1988. The lowest temperature ever recorded was −50.0 °C (−58.0 °F) on February 1, 1893.

Climate data for Saskatoon SRC (University of Saskatchewan), 1991–2020 normals, extremes 1915–present (Note: Climate data was recorded on the University of Saskatchewan campus from 1915 to 1966. In 1966 the station was moved 4 km (2.5 mi) northeast to the current location, near Attridge and Circle Dr.)
Month	Jan	Feb	Mar	Apr	May	Jun	Jul	Aug	Sep	Oct	Nov	Dec	Year
Record high °C (°F)	8.9 (48.0)	12.8 (55.0)	20.0 (68.0)	33.3 (91.9)	36.7 (98.1)	41.0 (105.8)	40.1 (104.2)	39.7 (103.5)	35.9 (96.6)	32.2 (90.0)	20.0 (68.0)	13.3 (55.9)	41.0 (105.8)
Mean daily maximum °C (°F)	−9.5 (14.9)	−7.3 (18.9)	−0.1 (31.8)	10.4 (50.7)	18.5 (65.3)	22.3 (72.1)	25.3 (77.5)	25.0 (77.0)	19.4 (66.9)	10.0 (50.0)	−0.4 (31.3)	−7.5 (18.5)	8.8 (47.8)
Daily mean °C (°F)	−14.3 (6.3)	−12.2 (10.0)	−5.1 (22.8)	4.4 (39.9)	11.6 (52.9)	16.3 (61.3)	19.0 (66.2)	18.3 (64.9)	12.9 (55.2)	4.7 (40.5)	−4.6 (23.7)	−11.9 (10.6)	3.0 (37.4)
Mean daily minimum °C (°F)	−19.0 (−2.2)	−17.1 (1.2)	−10.0 (14.0)	−1.7 (28.9)	4.7 (40.5)	10.2 (50.4)	12.6 (54.7)	11.5 (52.7)	6.3 (43.3)	−0.7 (30.7)	−8.8 (16.2)	−16.2 (2.8)	−2.7 (27.1)
Record low °C (°F)	−46.1 (−51.0)	−45.0 (−49.0)	−38.9 (−38.0)	−27.8 (−18.0)	−10.0 (14.0)	−3.9 (25.0)	0.0 (32.0)	−2.8 (27.0)	−10.6 (12.9)	−25.6 (−14.1)	−33.9 (−29.0)	−42.2 (−44.0)	−46.1 (−51.0)
Average precipitation mm (inches)	13.2 (0.52)	9.1 (0.36)	11.2 (0.44)	23.3 (0.92)	37.6 (1.48)	73.9 (2.91)	60.1 (2.37)	46.4 (1.83)	33.4 (1.31)	20.4 (0.80)	13.8 (0.54)	9.9 (0.39)	352.3 (13.87)
Average rainfall mm (inches)	0.4 (0.02)	0.2 (0.01)	2.4 (0.09)	16.2 (0.64)	34.4 (1.35)	63.6 (2.50)	53.8 (2.12)	44.4 (1.75)	36.8 (1.45)	9.7 (0.38)	1.1 (0.04)	0.9 (0.04)	263.8 (10.39)
Average snowfall cm (inches)	14.2 (5.6)	8.9 (3.5)	12.1 (4.8)	5.6 (2.2)	2.1 (0.8)	0.0 (0.0)	0.0 (0.0)	0.0 (0.0)	1.3 (0.5)	9.1 (3.6)	11.3 (4.4)	11.9 (4.7)	76.6 (30.2)
Average precipitation days (≥ 0.2 mm)	11.5	8.1	9.8	9.3	9.3	13.4	12.0	9.4	8.0	8.8	8.8	10.3	118.7
Average rainy days (≥ 0.2 mm)	0.5	0.2	1.9	5.7	9.5	12.2	10.5	9.5	8.8	5.3	1.1	0.4	65.5
Average snowy days (≥ 0.2 cm)	9.1	7.1	6.9	2.6	0.5	0.0	0.0	0.0	0.3	2.9	6.2	9.3	44.9
Mean monthly sunshine hours	105.3	139.6	204.0	231.4	274.7	253.0	305.5	276.9	214.7	158.7	97.4	89.2	2,350.4
Percentage possible sunshine	40.6	50.0	55.2	55.3	56.3	50.6	60.9	61.2	56.7	48.3	36.9	36.8	52.4
Average ultraviolet index	1	1	2	4	5	6	7	6	4	2	1	0	3
Source 1: University of Saskatchewan
Source 2: Environment and Climate Change Canada (rain, snow 1981–2010), Weather Atlas (UV)

Climate data for Saskatoon (Saskatoon John G. Diefenbaker International Airport) WMO ID: 71866; coordinates 52°10′N 106°43′W; elevation: 504.1 m (1,654 ft); 1991–2020 normals, extremes 1892-presetnt
Month	Jan	Feb	Mar	Apr	May	Jun	Jul	Aug	Sep	Oct	Nov	Dec	Year
Record high humidex	6.8	7.6	19.2	30.6	36.0	42.7	43.9	42.0	38.7	30.0	19.3	10.7	43.9
Record high °C (°F)	10.0 (50.0)	12.8 (55.0)	22.8 (73.0)	33.3 (91.9)	37.2 (99.0)	40.6 (105.1)	40.5 (104.9)	38.6 (101.5)	35.7 (96.3)	35.3 (95.5)	21.7 (71.1)	14.4 (57.9)	40.6 (105.1)
Mean maximum °C (°F)	4.0 (39.2)	3.1 (37.6)	11.4 (52.5)	23.3 (73.9)	29.0 (84.2)	30.6 (87.1)	32.3 (90.1)	33.3 (91.9)	29.5 (85.1)	22.4 (72.3)	10.6 (51.1)	3.9 (39.0)	34.4 (93.9)
Mean daily maximum °C (°F)	−10.0 (14.0)	−7.9 (17.8)	−0.7 (30.7)	10.5 (50.9)	18.3 (64.9)	22.1 (71.8)	25.0 (77.0)	24.8 (76.6)	19.1 (66.4)	9.9 (49.8)	−0.7 (30.7)	−8.0 (17.6)	8.5 (47.4)
Daily mean °C (°F)	−15.4 (4.3)	−13.4 (7.9)	−6.1 (21.0)	3.9 (39.0)	10.9 (51.6)	15.6 (60.1)	18.3 (64.9)	17.4 (63.3)	11.9 (53.4)	3.7 (38.7)	−5.6 (21.9)	−13.0 (8.6)	2.3 (36.2)
Mean daily minimum °C (°F)	−20.7 (−5.3)	−18.9 (−2.0)	−11.4 (11.5)	−2.6 (27.3)	3.4 (38.1)	9.0 (48.2)	11.5 (52.7)	10.0 (50.0)	4.7 (40.5)	−2.4 (27.7)	−10.4 (13.3)	−18.0 (−0.4)	−3.8 (25.1)
Mean minimum °C (°F)	−36.6 (−33.9)	−32.3 (−26.1)	−27.2 (−17.0)	−12.1 (10.2)	−5.2 (22.6)	2.1 (35.8)	5.6 (42.1)	3.0 (37.4)	−4.0 (24.8)	−11.8 (10.8)	−23.0 (−9.4)	−31.6 (−24.9)	−38.2 (−36.8)
Record low °C (°F)	−48.9 (−56.0)	−50.0 (−58.0)	−43.3 (−45.9)	−28.3 (−18.9)	−12.8 (9.0)	−3.3 (26.1)	−0.6 (30.9)	−2.8 (27.0)	−11.1 (12.0)	−25.6 (−14.1)	−39.4 (−38.9)	−43.9 (−47.0)	−50.0 (−58.0)
Record low wind chill	−60.9	−59.0	−50.1	−38.3	−16.2	−7.7	0.0	−4.8	−14.5	−33.4	−46.4	−57.6	−60.9
Average precipitation mm (inches)	14.2 (0.56)	9.1 (0.36)	13.6 (0.54)	23.0 (0.91)	42.3 (1.67)	75.0 (2.95)	58.8 (2.31)	42.5 (1.67)	32.2 (1.27)	20.8 (0.82)	14.2 (0.56)	11.6 (0.46)	357.3 (14.08)
Average rainfall mm (inches)	0.8 (0.03)	1.0 (0.04)	4.6 (0.18)	17.7 (0.70)	39.3 (1.55)	71.9 (2.83)	61.1 (2.41)	45.8 (1.80)	34.9 (1.37)	13.8 (0.54)	1.7 (0.07)	0.9 (0.04)	293.5 (11.56)
Average snowfall cm (inches)	19.7 (7.8)	11.2 (4.4)	13.9 (5.5)	7.5 (3.0)	1.3 (0.5)	0.0 (0.0)	0.0 (0.0)	0.0 (0.0)	0.3 (0.1)	7.4 (2.9)	13.0 (5.1)	16.7 (6.6)	91.0 (35.8)
Average precipitation days (≥ 0.2 mm)	11.2	8.2	8.4	8.5	9.1	12.5	12.4	9.9	8.9	7.6	8.8	10.2	115.7
Average rainy days (≥ 0.2 mm)	0.71	0.82	1.8	6.9	9.4	12.4	12.1	9.7	8.4	5.9	1.2	1.1	70.4
Average snowy days (≥ 0.2 cm)	13.2	8.8	8.7	3.8	0.65	0.0	0.0	0.0	0.29	2.7	8.2	10.8	57.1
Average relative humidity (%) (at 15:00 LST)	74.9	74.4	68.5	47.0	41.0	50.7	52.5	47.9	48.0	54.9	70.5	75.9	58.9
Average dew point °C (°F)	−17.8 (0.0)	−15.8 (3.6)	−9.1 (15.6)	−3.0 (26.6)	1.9 (35.4)	8.9 (48.0)	12.6 (54.7)	10.8 (51.4)	5.3 (41.5)	−1.3 (29.7)	−8.3 (17.1)	−15.2 (4.6)	−2.6 (27.3)
Source 1: Environment and Climate Change Canada (July maximum)
Source 2: weatherstats.ca (dew point and monthly / yearly average temperature)

== Demographics ==
Historical populations
Year	Pop.	±%
1901	113	—
1911	12,004	+10523.0%
1921	25,739	+114.4%
1931	43,291	+68.2%
1941	43,027	−0.6%
1951	53,268	+23.8%
1956	72,858	+36.8%
1961	95,526	+31.1%
1966	115,892	+21.3%
1971	126,449	+9.1%
1976	133,750	+5.8%
1981	154,210	+15.3%
1986	177,641	+15.2%
1991	186,058	+4.7%
1996	193,653	+4.1%
2001	196,811	+1.6%
2006	202,340	+2.8%
2011	222,246	+9.8%
2016	246,376	+10.9%
2021	266,141	+8.0%

Canada census – Saskatoon community profile

	2021	2016	2011
Population	266,141 (+7.7% from 2016)	246,376 (10.6% from 2011)	222,189 (9.8% from 2006)
Land area	226.56 km^{2} (87.48 sq mi)	228.13 km^{2} (88.08 sq mi)	209.56 km^{2} (80.91 sq mi)
Population density	1,174.7/km^{2} (3,042/sq mi)	1,080.0/km^{2} (2,797/sq mi)	1,060.3/km^{2} (2,746/sq mi)
Median age	36.8 (M: 35.6, F: 38)	35.8 (M: 34.8, F: 36.9)	35.6 (M: 34.2, F: 37.0)
Private dwellings	107,050 (total)	107,098 (total)	96,257 (total)
Median household income		$79,001	$68,288

References: 2021 2016 2011

In the 2021 Canadian census conducted by Statistics Canada, Saskatoon had a population of 266,141 living in 107,052 of its 115,619 total private dwellings, a change of 7.7% from its 2016 population of 247,201. The population of Saskatoon is made up of 50.9% women and 49.1% men. With a land area of 226.56 square kilometres (87.48 sq mi), it had a population density of 1,174.7/km^{2} (3,042.5/sq mi) in 2021.

At the census metropolitan area (CMA) level in the 2021 census, the Saskatoon CMA had a population of 317,480 living in 125,100 of its 134,720 total private dwellings, a change of 7.6% from its 2016 population of 295,095. With a land area of 5,864.48 km^{2} (2,264.29 sq mi), it had a population density of 54.1/km^{2} (140.2/sq mi) in 2021.

The 2021 census reported that immigrants (individuals born outside Canada) comprise 53,210 persons or 20.4% of the total population of Saskatoon. Of the total immigrant population, the top countries of origin were Philippines (11,840 persons or 22.3%), India (5,845 persons or 11.0%), China (4,695 persons or 8.8%), Pakistan (3,975 persons or 7.5%), Nigeria (2,090 persons or 3.9%), United Kingdom (2,045 persons or 3.8%), Bangladesh (1,830 persons or 3.4%), Vietnam (1,510 persons or 2.8%), United States of America (1,470 persons or 2.8%), and Iraq (1,200 persons or 2.3%).

=== Ethnicity ===
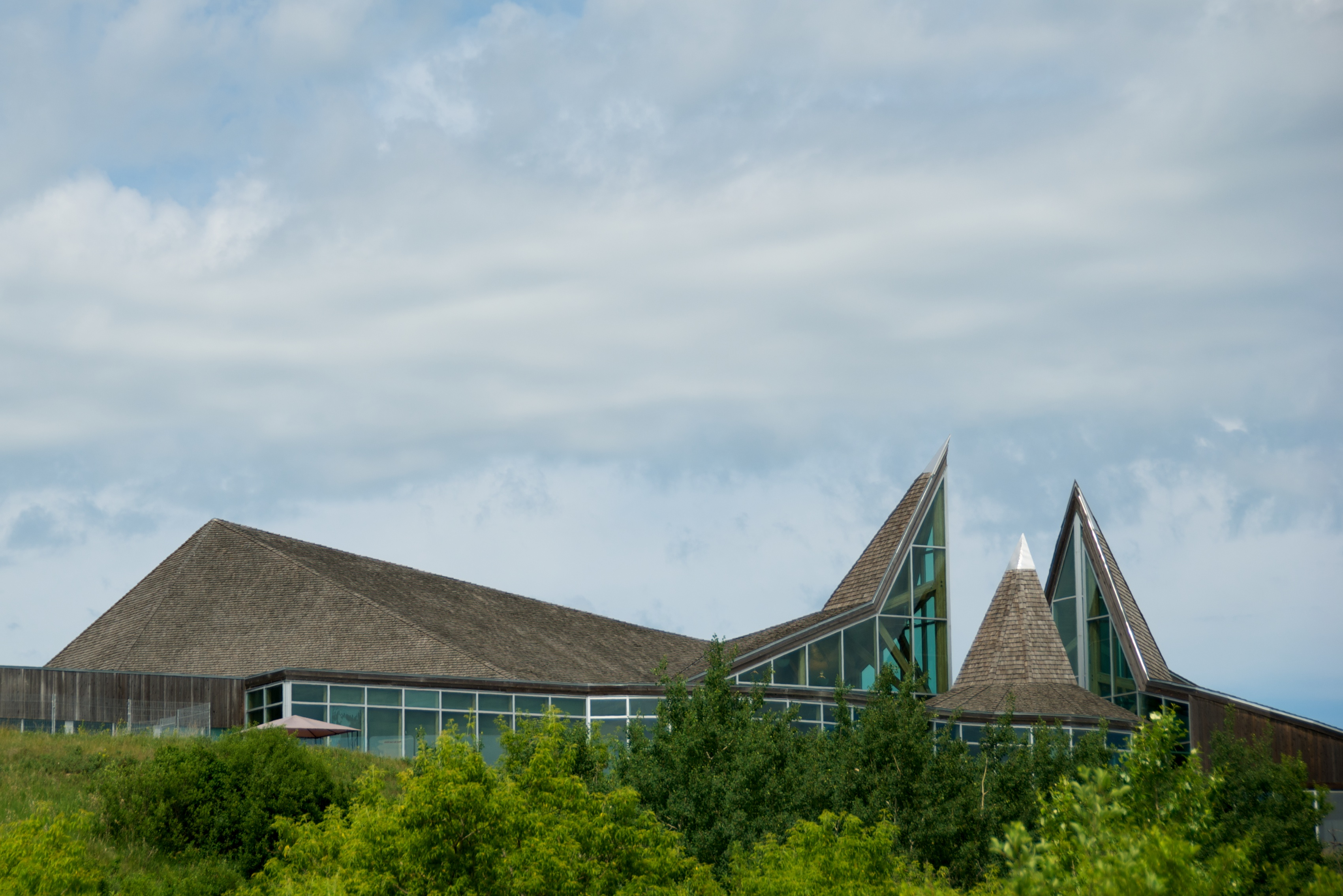
Located outside the city limits, Wanuskewin Heritage Park is a National Historic Site, and an archaeological site. The park showcases the history of the Northern Plains peoples in the region.

Largest ethnic origin in Saskatoon CMA by census tract based on the 2021 census

Ethnic Origin	Population	Percent
German	59,110	22.7%
English	48,140	18.4%
Scottish	40,355	15.5%
Ukrainian	37,740	14.5%
Irish	33,855	13.0%
French n.o.s	24,655	9.4%
Canadian	20,900	8.0%
Norwegian	16,175	6.2%
Polish	13,990	5.4%
Filipino	13,320	5.1%
Métis	12,010	4.6%
Note: multiple responses permitted

The Saskatoon area was inhabited long before any permanent settlement was established, to which the ongoing archaeological work at Wanuskewin Heritage Park and other locations bears witness. Canada's First Nations population has been increasingly urbanized, and nowhere is that more apparent than in Saskatoon, where the First Nations population increased by 382% from 1981 to 2001; however, a portion of this increase, possibly as much as half, is believed to be due to more people identifying themselves as Indigenous in the census rather than migration or birth rate.

Saskatoon has the second highest percentage of Indigenous population among major Canadian cities at approximately 11.5%, behind Winnipeg at 12.4% and Regina close by with 10.4%; in certain neighbourhoods such as Pleasant Hill, this percentage exceeds 40%. Most First Nations residents are of Cree or Dakota cultural background although to a lesser extent Saulteaux, Assiniboine, and Dene communities also exist.

Saskatoon also has a substantial Métis population and is close to the historically significant Southbranch Settlements to the north, as well as the Prairie Ronde settlement near Dundurn, Saskatchewan.

Panethnic groups in the City of Saskatoon (2001–2021)
Panethnic group	2021		2016		2011		2006		2001	
Panethnic group	Pop.	%	Pop.	%	Pop.	%	Pop.	%	Pop.	%
European (Note: Statistic includes all persons that did not make up part of a visible minority or an indigenous identity.)	166,540	63.82%	166,325	68.9%	168,960	77.39%	164,965	82.74%	162,460	83.89%
Indigenous	29,885	11.45%	27,310	11.31%	21,335	9.77%	19,820	9.94%	19,020	9.82%
South Asian	18,880	7.23%	13,335	5.52%	5,925	2.71%	2,210	1.11%	1,820	0.94%
Southeast Asian (Note: Statistic includes total responses of "Filipino" and "Southeast Asian" under visible minority section on census.)	17,810	6.82%	13,105	5.43%	8,555	3.92%	2,865	1.44%	2,545	1.31%
East Asian (Note: Statistic includes total responses of "Chinese", "Korean", and "Japanese" under visible minority section on census.)	10,070	3.86%	8,650	3.58%	5,995	2.75%	4,615	2.31%	4,220	2.18%
African	8,325	3.19%	5,390	2.23%	2,480	1.14%	1,825	0.92%	1,480	0.76%
Middle Eastern (Note: Statistic includes total responses of "West Asian" and "Arab" under visible minority section on census.)	4,745	1.82%	3,475	1.44%	2,490	1.14%	1,595	0.8%	830	0.43%
Latin American	2,545	0.98%	1,915	0.79%	1,235	0.57%	1,045	0.52%	835	0.43%
Other/Multiracial (Note: Statistic includes total responses of "Visible minority, n.i.e." and "Multiple visible minorities" under visible minority section on census.)	2,150	0.82%	1,910	0.79%	1,345	0.62%	435	0.22%	470	0.24%
Total responses	260,955	98.05%	241,415	97.99%	218,320	98.26%	199,380	98.54%	193,665	98.4%
Total population	266,141	100%	246,376	100%	222,189	100%	202,340	100%	196,811	100%
Note: Totals greater than 100% due to multiple origin responses

=== Religion ===
According to the 2021 census, religious groups in Saskatoon included:

- Christianity (134,900 persons or 51.7%)
- Irreligion (98,575 persons or 37.8%)
- Islam (12,985 persons or 5.0%)
- Hinduism (5,125 persons or 2.0%)
- Sikhism (3,155 persons or 1.2%)
- Buddhism (1,935 persons or 0.7%)
- Indigenous Spirituality (1,650 persons or 0.6%)
- Judaism (565 persons or 0.2%)
- Other (2,065 persons or 0.8%)

According to the 2011 Census, 66% of the population identified as Christian, with Catholics (28.5%) making up the largest denomination, followed by United Church (10.9%), and other denominations. Others identified as Muslim (2.6%), Buddhist (0.8%), Hindu (0.7%), with traditional (indigenous) spirituality (0.5%), and with other religions. 28.5% of the population reported no religious affiliation.

== Culture ==
=== Events and festivals ===
Saskatoon's major arts venue is TCU Place, which is next to Midtown Plaza downtown. Since opening in 1967, it has hosted scores of concerts, theatrical performances, live events such as the Telemiracle telethon, high school graduation and university convocation ceremonies, and conventions. It is also home to the Saskatoon Symphony Orchestra. It recently underwent a multimillion-dollar renovation to its main theatre (named in honour of former mayor and senator Sidney Buckwold).

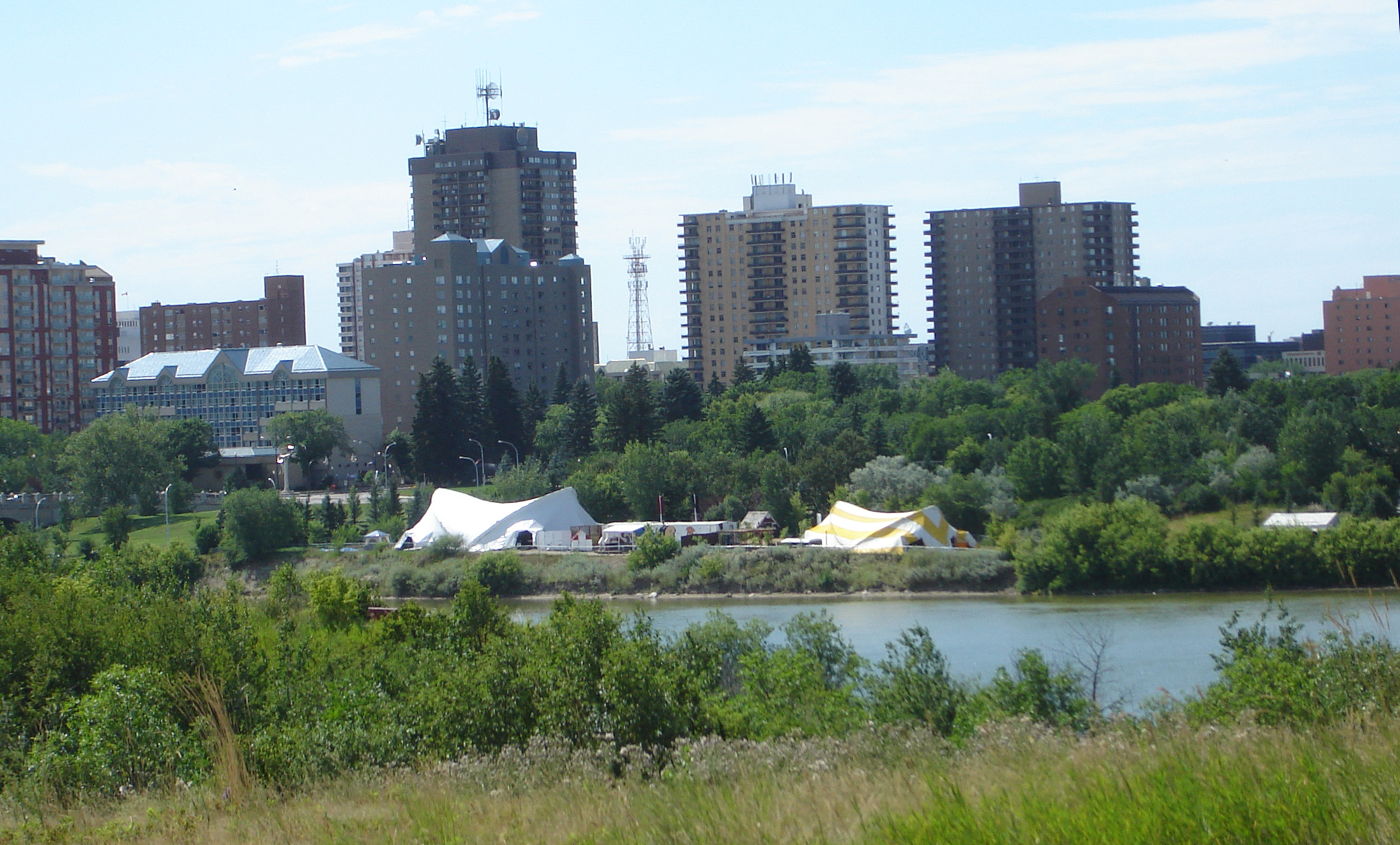
Shakespeare on the Saskatchewan is an annual Shakespeare in the Park festival held in Saskatoon.

For rock concerts and major shows, SaskTel Centre is the main venue. It is Saskatchewan's largest arena, with a capacity of 15,195 for sporting events and 14,000 for concerts. Musical acts from Saskatoon include Joni Mitchell, Kyle Riabko, Wide Mouth Mason, The Northern Pikes, The Sheepdogs, One Bad Son and The Deep Dark Woods, as well as countless others popular at both local and regional levels. The facility was the 2007 host for the Juno Awards, Canada's foremost music industry honours.

Saskatoon hosts many festivals and events in the summer, including the Shakespeare on the Saskatchewan Festival, The Great Plains Comedy Festival, the Jazz Festival, the Saskatchewan Children's Festival, the Saskatoon Fringe Theatre Festival (a showcase of alternative theatre), Saskatoon Folkfest (a cultural festival), Doors Open Saskatoon, Fairy Door Tours Saskatoon and the Canada Remembers Airshow.

For over 25 years, Saskatoon has hosted a gathering of antique automobiles, (mainly from the 1960s) that has grown into an event called "Cruise Weekend". The event is usually held on the last weekend (Friday, Saturday and Sunday) in August. Activities include a poker derby, dances, and a show 'N' shine with over 800 cars from all over western Canada. No admission is charged and everyone is free to walk around and enjoy the atmosphere.

The city's annual exhibition (now called the Saskatoon Exhibition but also known in previous years as Pioneer Days and "The Ex") is held every August at Prairieland Park. In the late 1990s, the Saskatoon Exhibition was rescheduled to August so that it no longer was in direct competition with the Calgary Stampede, which frequently overlapped the event.

Saskatoon's Sikh community celebrates the festival of Vaisakhi with a parade held in May.

The francophone community is represented by the Fédération des francophones de Saskatoon which organizes many cultural events.

=== Galleries and museums ===
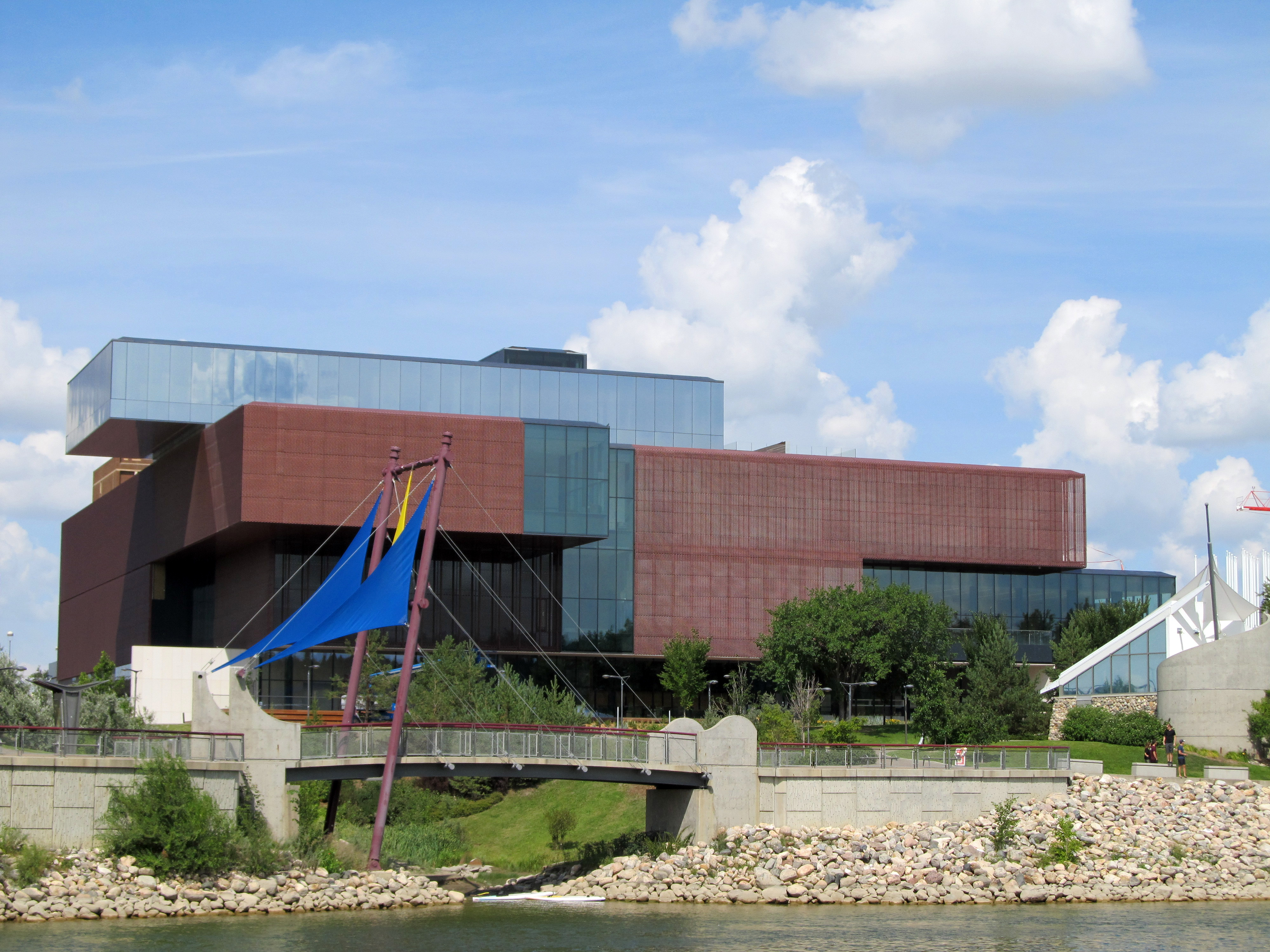
Established in 2017, Remai Modern is an art gallery located in Saskatoon's Central Business District.

Art museums in Saskatoon include the Remai Modern, located at River Landing, a development along the shoreline of the South Saskatchewan River, in the Central Business District. The art museum is situated in a 11,582 square metres (124,670 sq ft) building designed by Bruce Kuwabara, and houses over 8,000 works in its collection. The design for the museum won the Award of Excellence from the Canadian Architect magazine in 2011. Pablo Picasso, Georges Braque and other 20th-century artists have a home in the Remai Modern museum. Opened on October 21, 2017, the Remai Modern has been listed at no. 18 in the New York Times "52 places to go in 2018: A starter kit for escaping into the world." The Remai Modern inherited the collection of the defunct Mendel Art Gallery, which operated in City Park from 1964 to 2015.

The Saskatchewan Craft Council Gallery is on the main floor of the Saskatchewan Craft Council building in the Broadway Avenue area. It is Saskatchewan's only public exhibition gallery dedicated to fine craft as an art form. Saskatchewan Craft Council Gallery presents seven to eight exhibitions each year. The SCC Fine Craft Boutique, located in the gallery, features the work of over 75 SCC fine craft artists.

The Ukrainian Museum of Canada is on the banks of the South Saskatchewan River. It was founded in 1941 by the Ukrainian Women's Association of Canada.

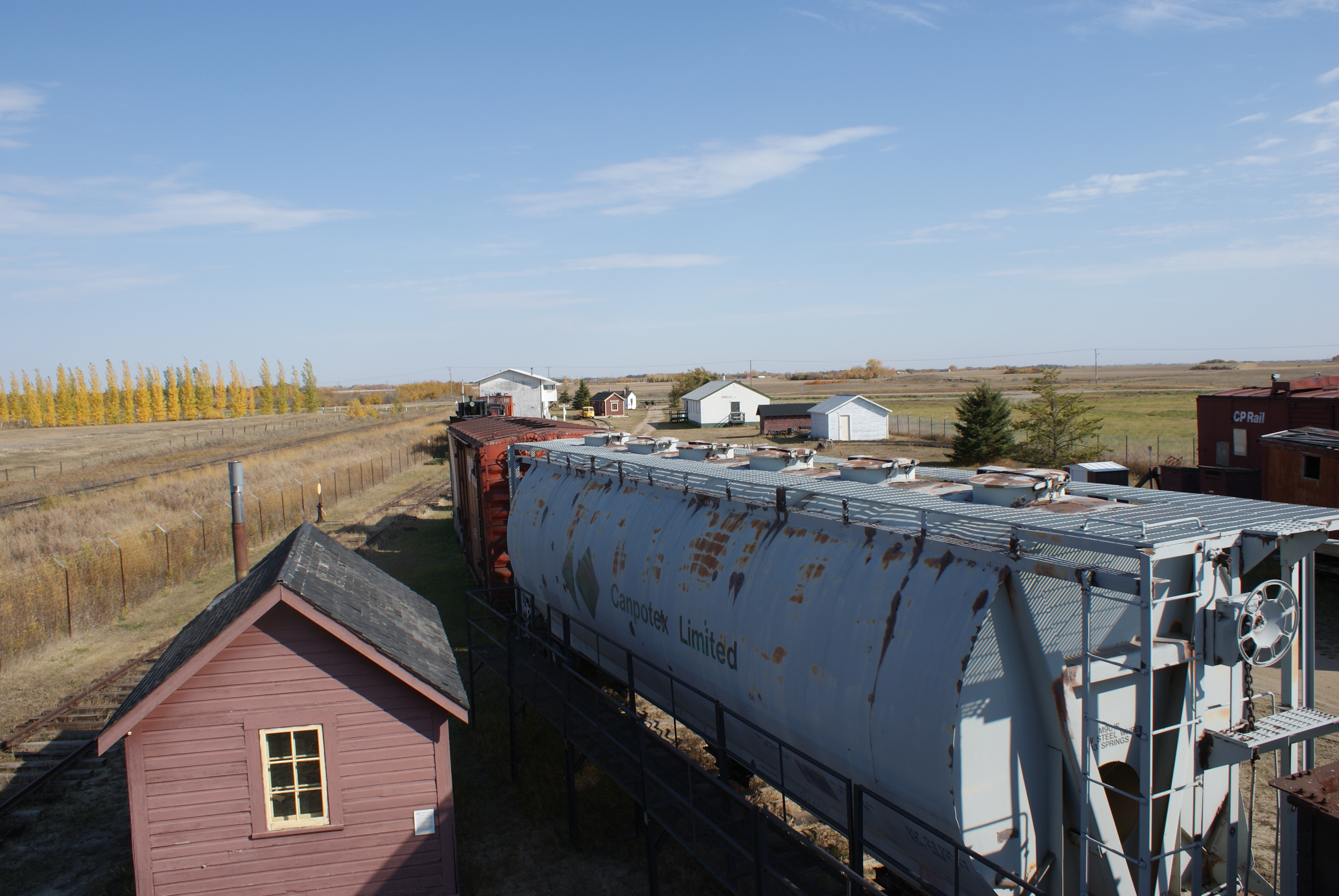
The Saskatchewan Railway Museum is a railway museum located west of the city limits.

The Meewasin Valley Centre, in Friendship Park, has information on Saskatoon's history, the South Saskatchewan River, and the future of the Meewasin Valley.

Saskatoon is also home of the Saskatchewan Western Development Museum. This museum, one of four throughout the province, documents early pioneer life in Saskatchewan. It is noted for its interior recreation of a "Boom Town" main street, including one original building relocated from its original site. The Saskatchewan Railway Museum is just outside the city and includes displays of rolling stock and historic railway buildings from various parts of the province.

The Forestry Farm Park and Zoo is a National Historic Site situated in the northeast region of the city. The Forestry Farm was a historic nursery (dating from 1913) responsible for growing many of the trees planted within the prairie provinces. In 1966 the nursery operations were discontinued and part of the region turned into a municipal park. The city zoo is also housed within the park and features over 80 species of animals. Wanuskewin Heritage Park is a National Historic Site situated 5 km (3.1 mi) to the north of Saskatoon. It is an Indigenous archaeological site and features displays, special events, and activities, recent renovations are on hold due to a lack of funds during the renovations.

=== Theatres ===
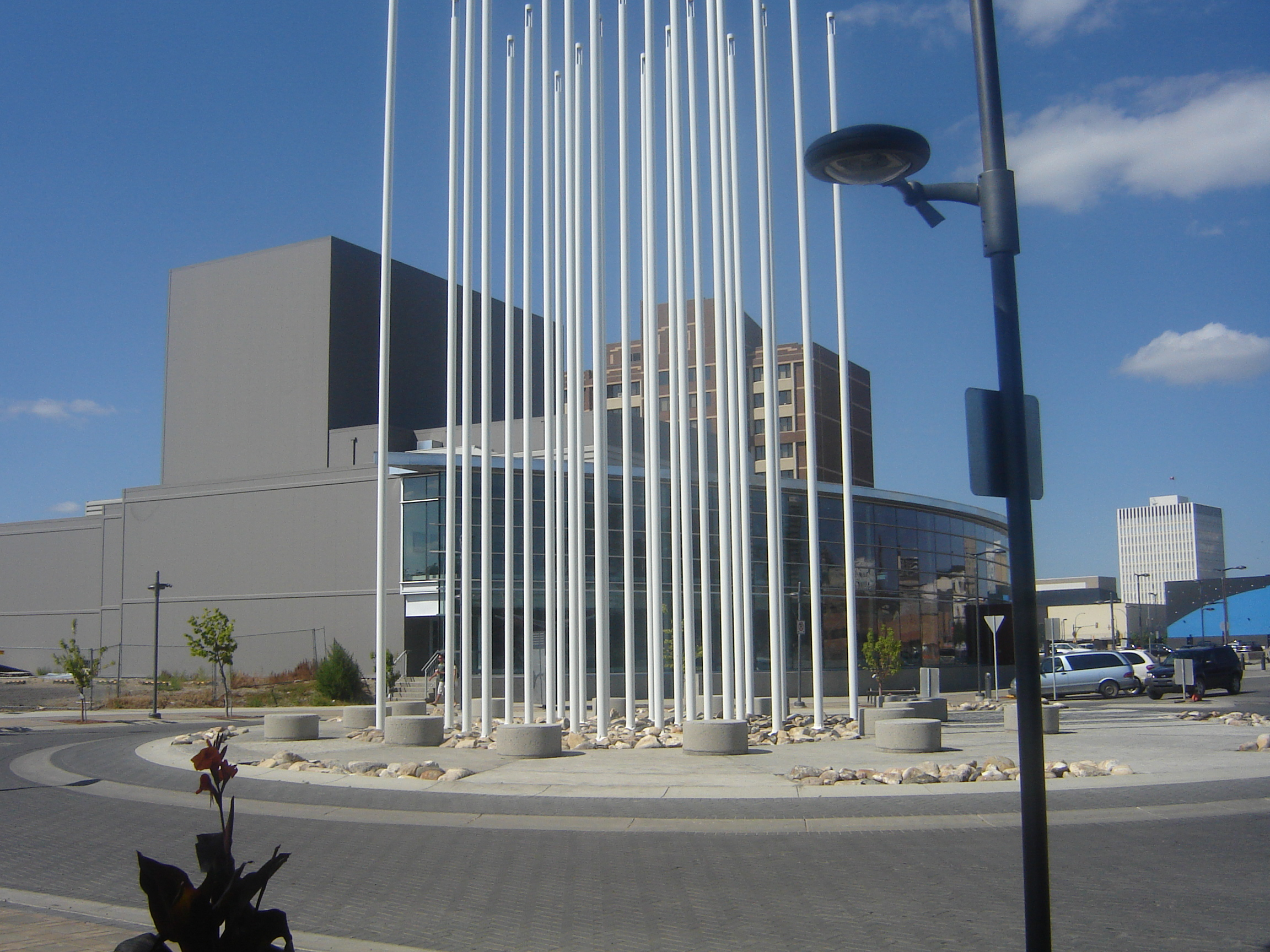
The Remai Arts Centre is a performing arts centre and home to the Saskatoon-based theatre company, the Persephone Theatre.

Live theatre is a central, vibrant part of Saskatoon's culture. Saskatoon is host to a number of live theatre venues such as the Persephone Theatre, which is in the Remai Arts Centre at River Landing in downtown Saskatoon, The Refinery and the Saskatchewan Native Theatre Company. The University of Saskatchewan also has a theatre called Greystone Theatre.

The Broadway Theatre primarily shows arthouse films – while the two-screen Roxy Theatre is an "atmospheric-style" second-run theatre that reopened in 2005 after sitting unused for over a decade. The remainder of the city's theatres are multiplexes. The only movie theatre in the downtown core is the Scotia Bank VIP Theatre; the Capitol 4 shut down on April 3, 2008. The city's other movie theatres are The Landmark Theatre in the new subdivision of Brighton, Rainbow Cinemas (a second-run cinema) and the Cineplex Cinemas at The Centre mall on the city's east side.

Among the many movie theatres of the past that have come and gone was the Capitol Theatre, which opened in 1929 with a showing of the first talkie to be exhibited in Saskatoon. The Capitol closed in the early 1980s to make way for the Scotia Centre office tower; its name was transferred to the aforementioned Capitol 4 a block away.

=== Other attractions ===
One of the city's landmarks is the Delta Bessborough Hotel, known to locals as the Bez. Built by the Canadian National Railway, it was among the last railway hotels to be started before the Great Depression of the 1930s brought their era to a close. Although the building was completed in 1932, it did not open its doors until 1935 due to the Depression. The Bessborough and the Mendel Art Gallery are the only major structures on the river side of Spadina Crescent. One of the most frequently circulated photographs of Saskatoon is of the hotel framed in one of the arches of the Broadway Bridge.

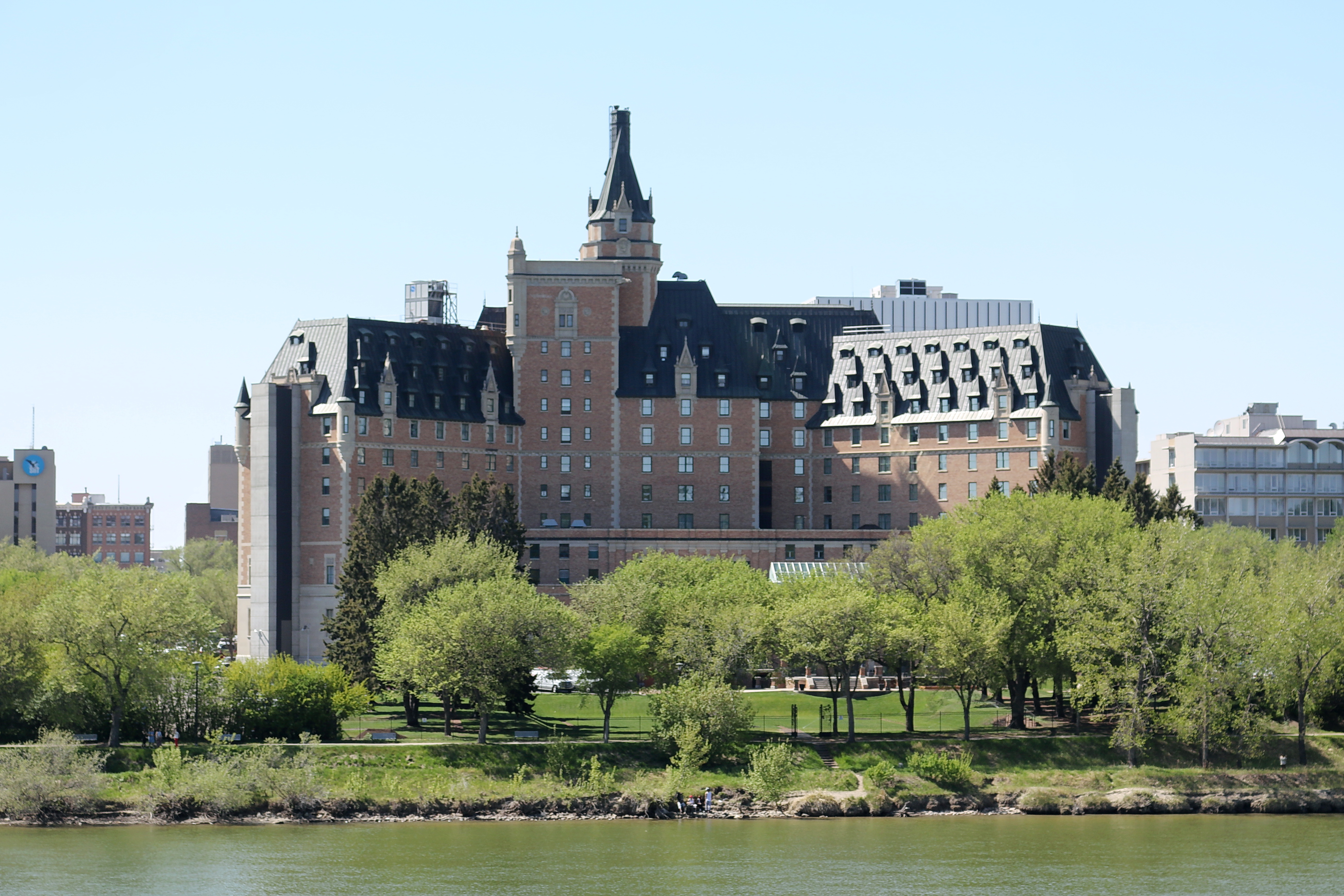
Completed in 1932, the Delta Bessborough is a Canadian grand railway hotel and a historic landmark in Saskatoon.

The Meewasin Valley Trail follows the South Saskatchewan River through Saskatoon. Summer activities include cycling, jogging and walking through parks and natural areas. Cross-country skiing is popular during the winter months, along with skating in Kiwanis Memorial Park. Access points are found throughout the city with interpretive signage and washrooms along the route. There are parks throughout the Meewasin Valley, with washrooms, picnic facilities, and lookout points along the river bank. In the winter the Meewasin Skating Rink is open free to the public; it is in Kiwanis Memorial Park beside the Delta Bessborough hotel. The outdoor rink has been open since 1980.

For years, a parcel of land west of the Traffic Bridge, south of 19th Street, and east of Avenue C has been the subject of on-again, off-again redevelopment plans. The site formerly held the Saskatoon Arena, a power plant, a branch of the Royal Canadian Legion, and the head offices of the Saskatoon Public School Division; all these structures have been demolished to make way for redevelopment, with plans for same dating back to the 1980s. The most recent version of the plan called River Landing is ongoing. Calgary developer Lake Placid has proposed a 200 million dollar mega hotel/condo project to be built on the site although Lake Placid had difficulty securing financing and missed an October 30, 2009, deadline to submit a 4.5 million dollar payment for the parcel of land which seemingly killed the deal. On November 16, 2009, it was revealed by Lake Placid that the financing should be secure within a week. In April 2010, Saskatoon City Council voted in favour of entering new negotiations with Lake Placid over the site. In November 2010, Victory Majors Investments buys out Lake Placid's interest in the project and in August 2011 of the next year proposed a major overhaul to original design which would later include building a 20-story residential and 14-story hotel towers, and an 18-story and a 13-story office tower as part of River Landing Towers completed in 2021.

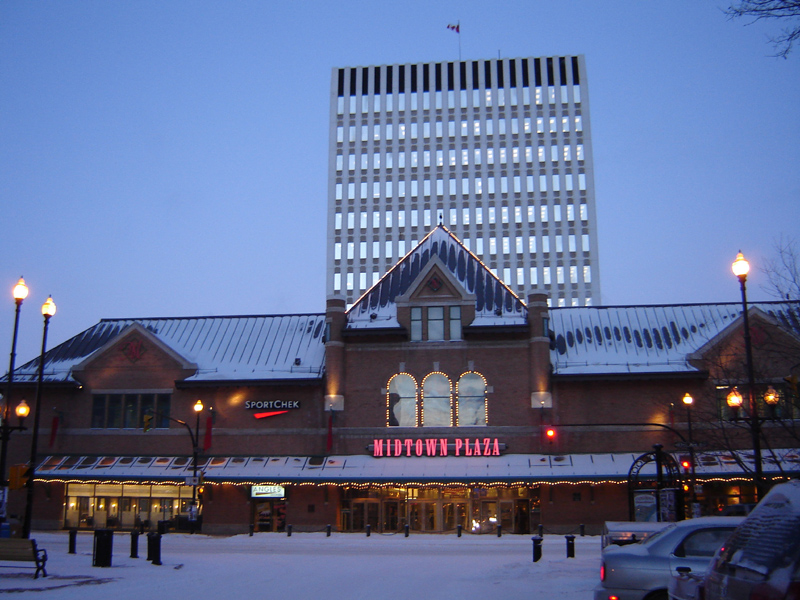
Located in Saskatoon's Central Business District, Midtown Plaza is one of several shopping centres in the city.

The Saskatoon Farmers' Market and some commercial sites have also been developed. Future plans separate from Lake Placid include the development of a new art gallery to replace the Mendel Art Gallery by 2014. Other landmarks in the city include the iconic Traffic Bridge (which was demolished in 2016 and is currently being replaced by a new structure evoking the appearance of the original), the University of Saskatchewan campus, and the large Viterra grain terminal which has dominated the western skyline of the city for decades and is large enough to be visible from Pike Lake Provincial Park, 32 km (20 mi) away.

==== Shopping centres ====
- Blairmore Shopping Centre
- The Centre
- Confederation Mall
- Erindale Centre/University Heights Mall
- Lawson Heights Mall
- Market Mall
- Midtown Plaza
- Preston Crossing
- River City Mall
- Stonegate Shopping Centre (in Stonebridge)

== Economy ==
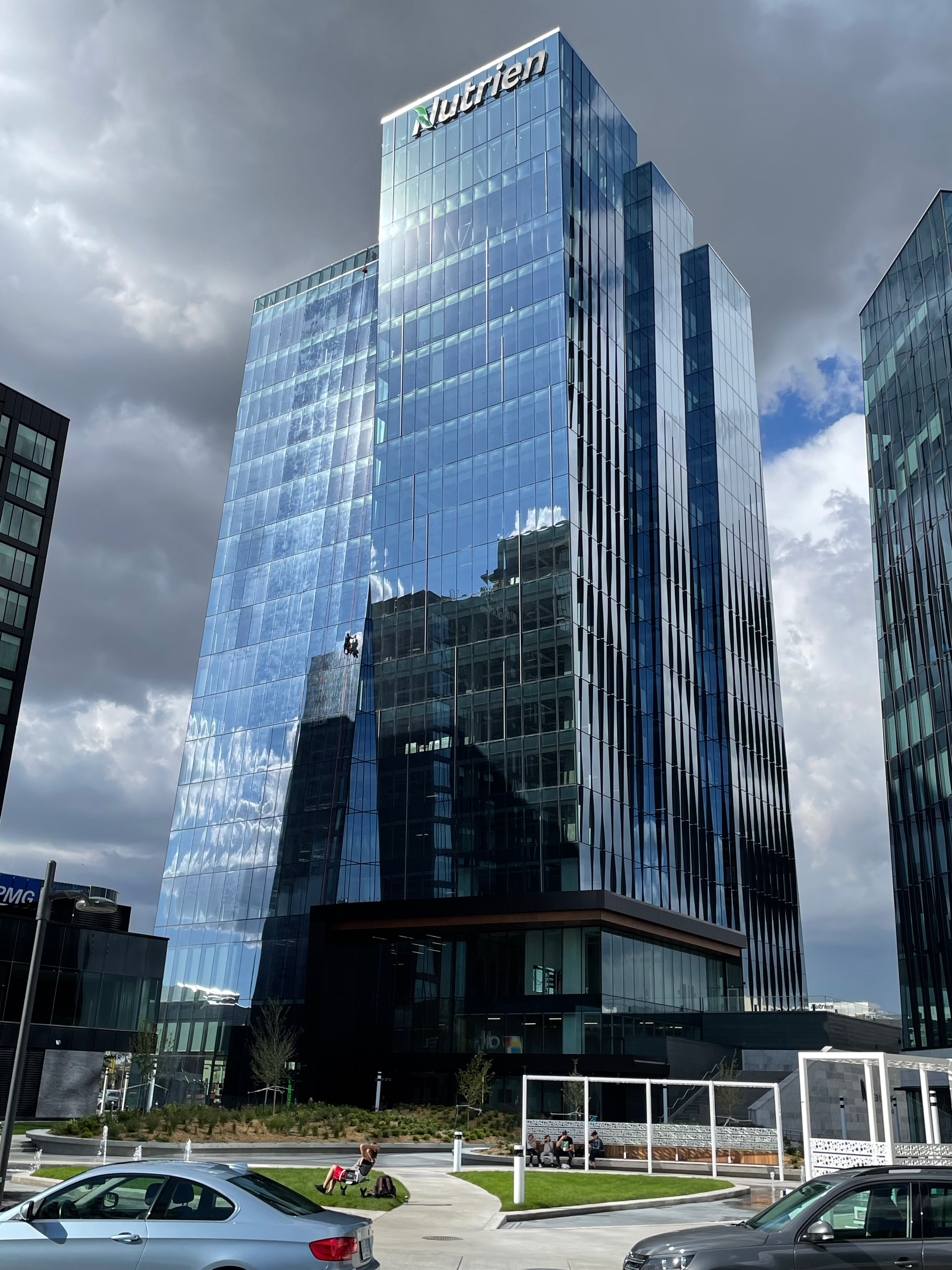
World's largest potash producer Nutrien's corporate head office tower in downtown Saskatoon

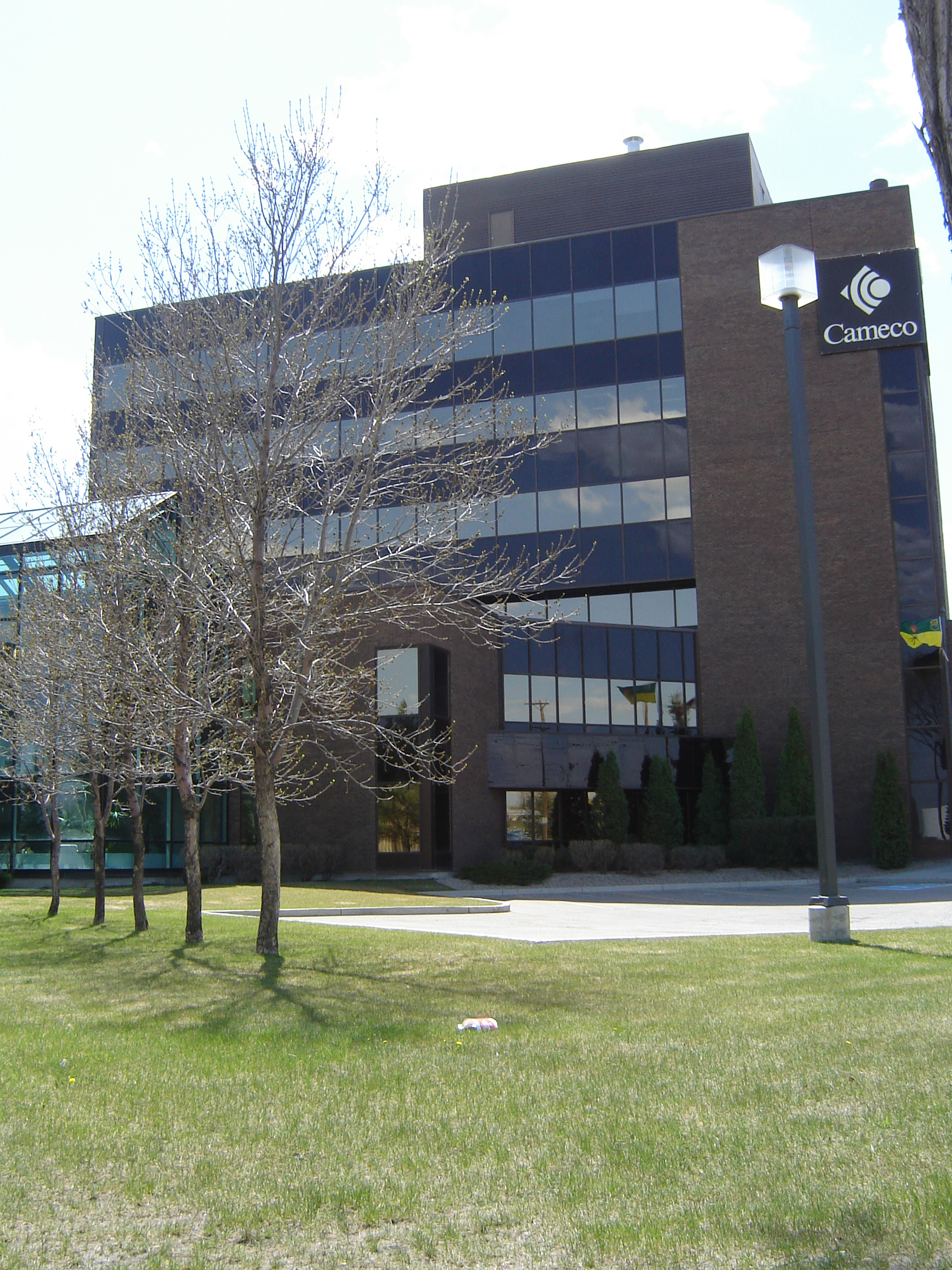
Headquarters for Cameco, the world's largest publicly traded uranium company. Saskatoon's economy has traditionally been associated with the primary sector of the economy.

The economy of Saskatoon has been associated with potash, oil and agriculture (specifically wheat), resulting in the moniker "POW City". Various grains, livestock, oil and gas, potash, uranium, gold, diamond, coal and their spin off industries fuel the economy. The world's largest publicly traded uranium company, Cameco, and the world's largest potash producer, Nutrien, have corporate headquarters in Saskatoon. Saskatoon is also the new home of BHP Billiton's Diamonds and Specialty Products business unit.

Nearly two-thirds of the world's recoverable potash reserves are in the Saskatoon region. Innovation Place founded in 1980 brings together almost 150 agriculture, information technology, and environmental, life sciences and agricultural biotechnology industries in a science park or technology park setting. Saskatoon is also home to the Canadian Light Source, Canada's national synchrotron facility.

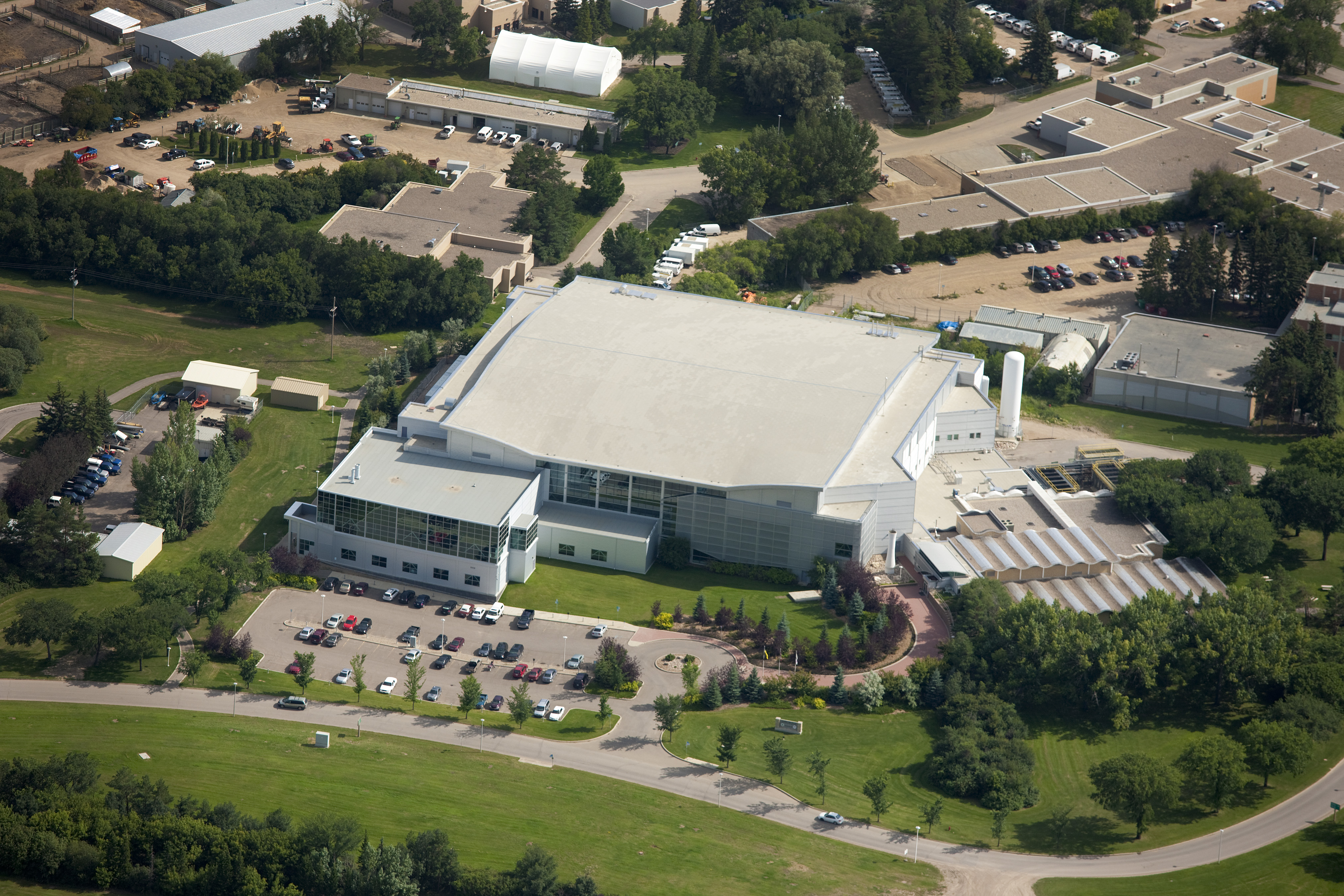
The Canadian Light Source building from the air

Saskatoon's digital media scene is growing with start-up tech companies such as Noodlecake, Point2, Vendasta Technologies, and Zu.

One of Saskatoon's nicknames, "Hub City", refers to its ideal central location within Canada for distribution and logistics. Saskatoon John G. Diefenbaker International Airport with 105,620 aircraft movements in 2008 was listed as the 19th busiest airport in Canada, 12th busiest in passenger traffic.

Saskatoon is developing the South Central Business District, or block 146, which is called the River Landing Project. Long range planning is underway for an expected city population of 325,000 by 2028 (2011 MXD report).

Saskatoon was expected to see a 4.2 percent growth in gross domestic product for the year 2012. The city saw a 3.4% growth in 2004, 5.1% increase in 2005 and a 2.8% increase in 2006. Saskatoon held Canada's No. 1 economic growth spot for Canada in 2005 according to the Conference Board of Canada. The Conference Board again predicted the city would rate first for economic increase in 2012, showing a growth rate of 4.2%. The Saskatoon Regional Economic Development Authority (SREDA) has also been ranked amongst Canada's top ten economic development organizations by Site Selection magazine.

From 1988 to 2016, Hitachi Canadian Industries operated a power equipment manufacturing plant. It was closed and assets acquired by Brandt Group in 2017.

== Government and politics ==
=== Municipal ===
Saskatoon is governed by a City Council comprising ten councillors elected to represent ten separate wards, and a mayor elected city-wide. Historically, councillors have at times been elected at-large, and term lengths for both councillors (known as aldermen until 1991) and mayors have varied over time; council has operated on a ward-basis continuously since 1994, while both mayors and councillors have served four-year terms since 2012. Municipal elections are held in the fall. As of 2025, 209 individuals have served on the town or city council, and 29 individuals have served as mayor, with 24 of those individuals having first served as a councillor. The city's current mayor, elected in the 2024 municipal election, is Cynthia Block.

=== Provincial ===
Saskatoon is represented in the Legislative Assembly of Saskatchewan by 15 of the province's 61 MLAs, including the riding of Martensville-Blairmore, which contains one of the city's neighbourhoods. Following the 2024 Saskatchewan general election in October 2024, thirteen of the city's MLAs are members of the New Democratic Party, and two, including the MLA for Martensville-Blairmore, are members of the governing Saskatchewan Party.

Saskatoon provincial election results
Year	Saskatchewan		New Democratic	
2024	41%	45,640	56%	62,881
2020	52%	53,428	45%	46,135

=== Federal ===
Saskatoon is represented by three MPs in the Canadian House of Commons. Following the 2025 Canadian federal election, all three seats belong to members of the Conservative Party.

Saskatoon federal election results
Year	Liberal		Conservative		New Democratic		Green	
2025	37%	49,986	50%	67,401	12%	15,720	1%	976
2021	11%	13,665	48%	57,114	35%	41,757	1%	1,299
2019	13%	17,211	51%	68,021	32%	42,091	3%	3,694

== Infrastructure ==
=== Health care ===
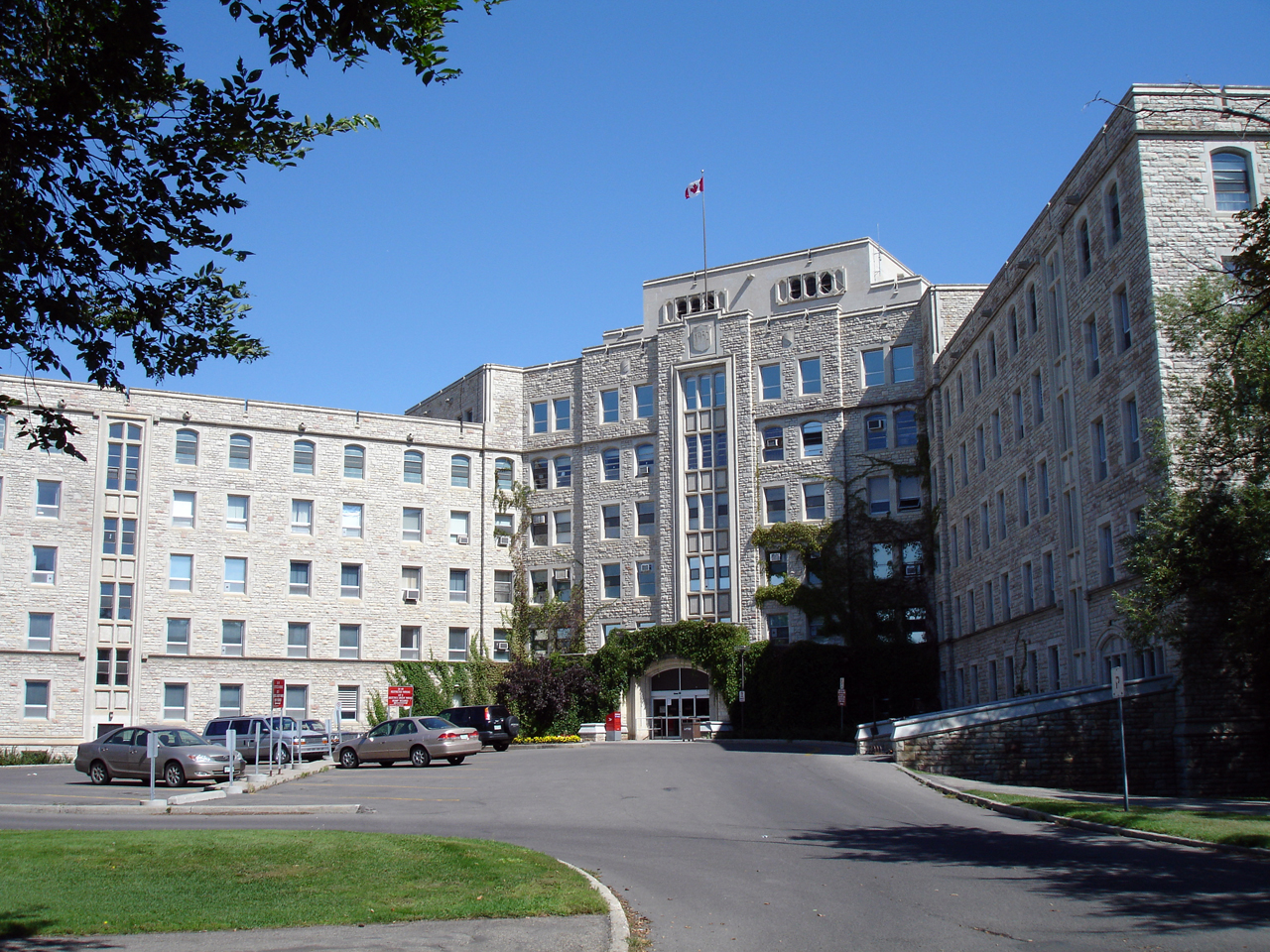
Royal University Hospital

The Saskatchewan Health Authority is responsible for health care delivery in the area. They operate four hospitals within the city boundaries, these include Royal University Hospital, Saskatoon City Hospital, and St. Paul's Hospital (Saskatoon), as well as Jim Pattison Children's Hospital, which is located within Royal University Hospital. Royal University Hospital is a teaching and research hospital that operates in partnership with the University of Saskatchewan. The health authority also operates hospitals in smaller neighbouring communities. In addition to hospitals the health authority operates long-term care facilities, clinics and other health care services. Jim Pattison Children's Hospital began construction in 2014 and opened in 2019 under the auspices of what was then the Saskatoon Health Region, since absorbed into the Saskatchewan Health Authority.

=== Fire protection ===
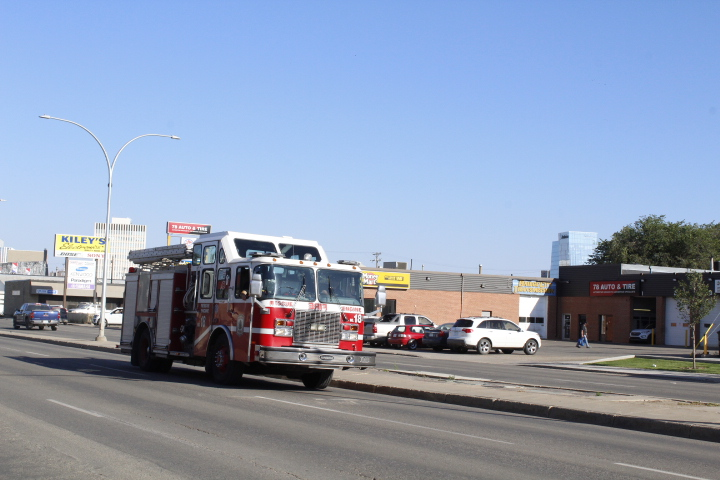
An SFD fire engine on 22nd Street in Riversdale

Fire protection is provided by the Saskatoon Fire Department. As of 2025, the department has 9 stations across the city and employs over 360 staff members. The department's main headquarters are located at Fire Hall No. 1, 125 Idylwyld Drive. To carry out their duties, the department is equipped with 12 fire engines, two ladder trucks, one heavy rescue vehicle, two water tenders, two brush trucks and three water craft, with two rigid-hull boats and one inflatable. The department has technical teams that specialize in surface water rescue, rope rescue, hazardous material disposal, rescue diving, vehicle extrication, urban search and rescue and emergency medical services.

=== Policing ===
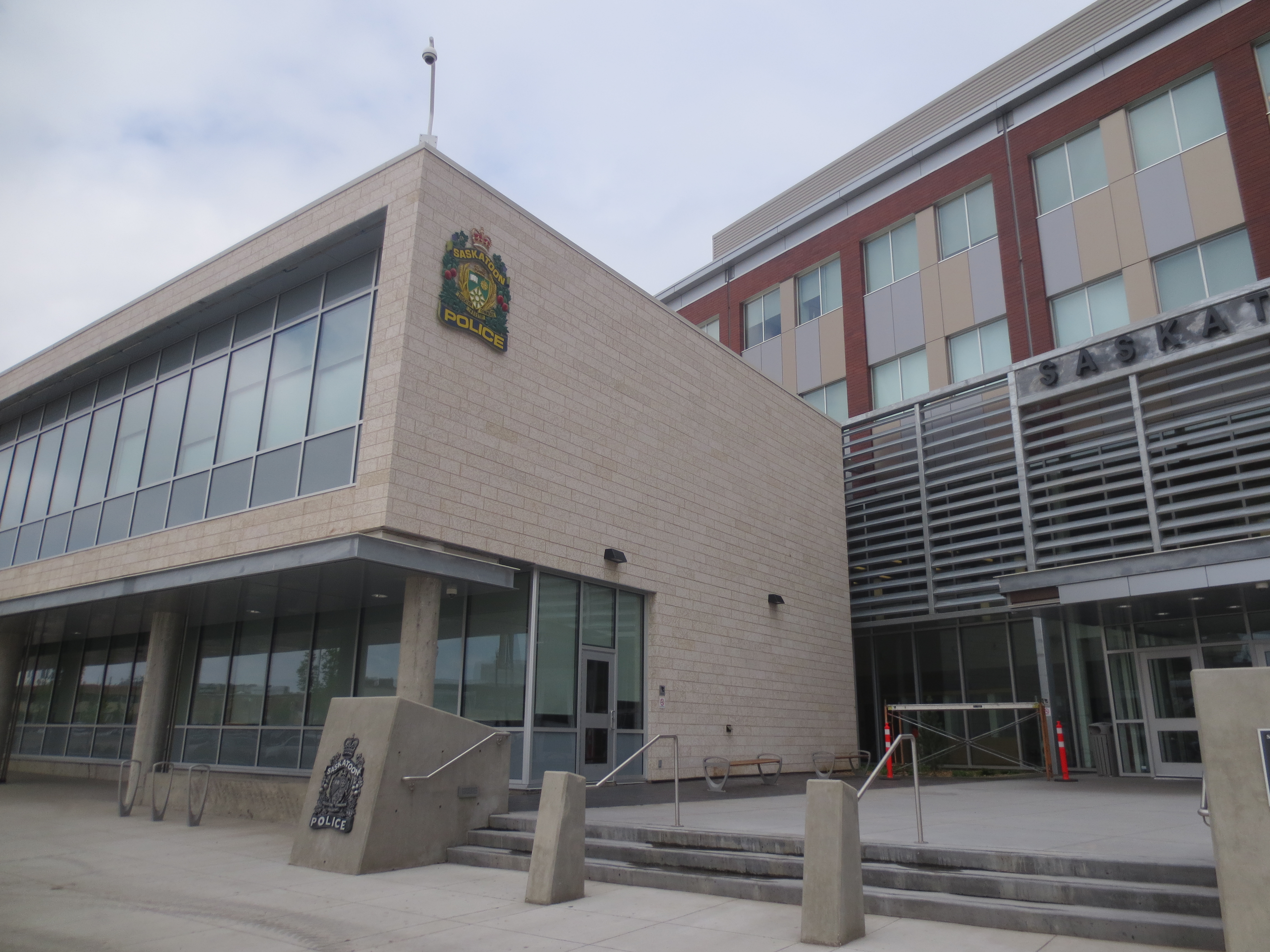
Headquarters for the Saskatoon Police Service. The service provides municipal policing for the city.

The Saskatoon Police Service is the primary police service for the city of Saskatoon and holds both Municipal and Provincial Jurisdiction. The following services also have jurisdiction in Saskatoon: Corman Park Police Service, Royal Canadian Mounted Police, Canadian National Railway Police Service and the Canadian Pacific Railway Police Service. As of December 31, 2012, the SPS had 442 sworn members, 59 Special Constables, and 136 civilian positions.

==== Crime ====
The 2006 census crime data, released July 18, 2007, showed Saskatoon leading Canada in violent crime, with 1,606 violent crimes per 100,000 residents annually. However, crime statistics produced by the Saskatoon Police Service shows that crime is on the decline. In 2010, total crimes against people went up 1.28% but total crimes against property fell by 11.75%. In 2014, Saskatoon dropped to fourth highest in Canada for its CSI after being in second place for several years. Crime in Canada uses Crime Severity Index calculated using the crime rate and the severity of those crimes. 2019 saw a record 16 homicides reported in Saskatoon, giving the city a homicide rate of around 6.5 murders per 100,000 people.

In the early 1990s, the Saskatoon police were found to engage in "starlight tours," where officers would arrest Indigenous men and drive them out of the city in the dead of winter to abandon them.

=== Transportation ===
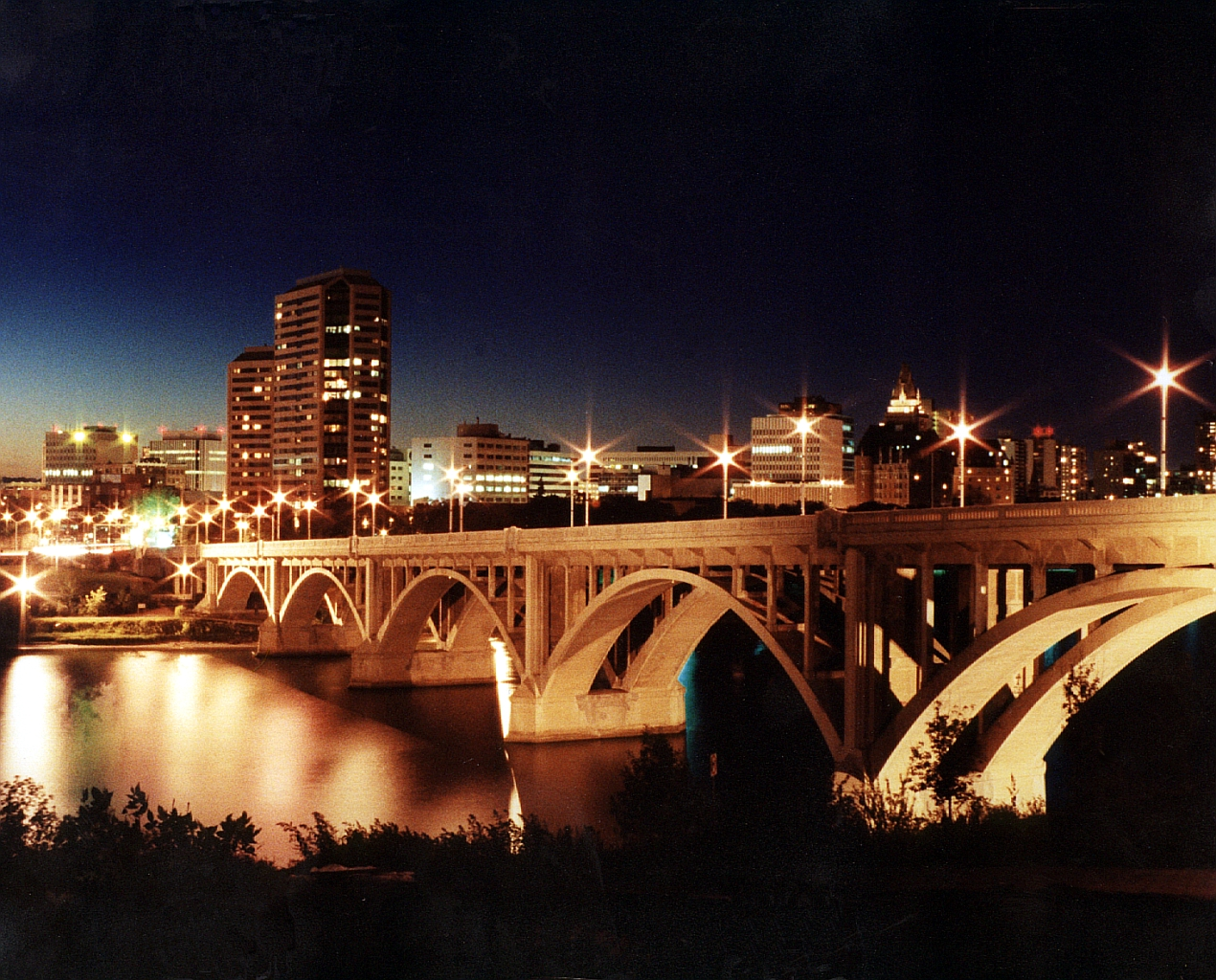
Broadway Bridge is one of several bridges that cross over the South Saskatchewan River.

==== Roads and bridges ====
Saskatoon is on the Yellowhead Highway spur of the Trans-Canada Highway, also known as Highway 16, which connects Saskatchewan, Manitoba, Alberta, and British Columbia. Highways 5, 7, 11, 12, 14, 41, 219, 684, and 762 all meet at Saskatoon, with Highway 60 terminating just outside the southwestern city limits. The following bridges cross the South Saskatchewan River in Saskatoon (in order from upstream):

- Grand Trunk Bridge (rail)
- Gordie Howe Bridge
- Senator Sid Buckwold Bridge
- Traffic Bridge
- Broadway Bridge
- University Bridge
- CPR Bridge (rail)
- Circle Drive Bridge
- Chief Mistawasis Bridge

Construction of Saskatoon's ring road, Circle Drive, began in the mid-1960s (after first being proposed in 1913), and was completed on July 31, 2013, with the opening of the $300 million South Circle Drive project.

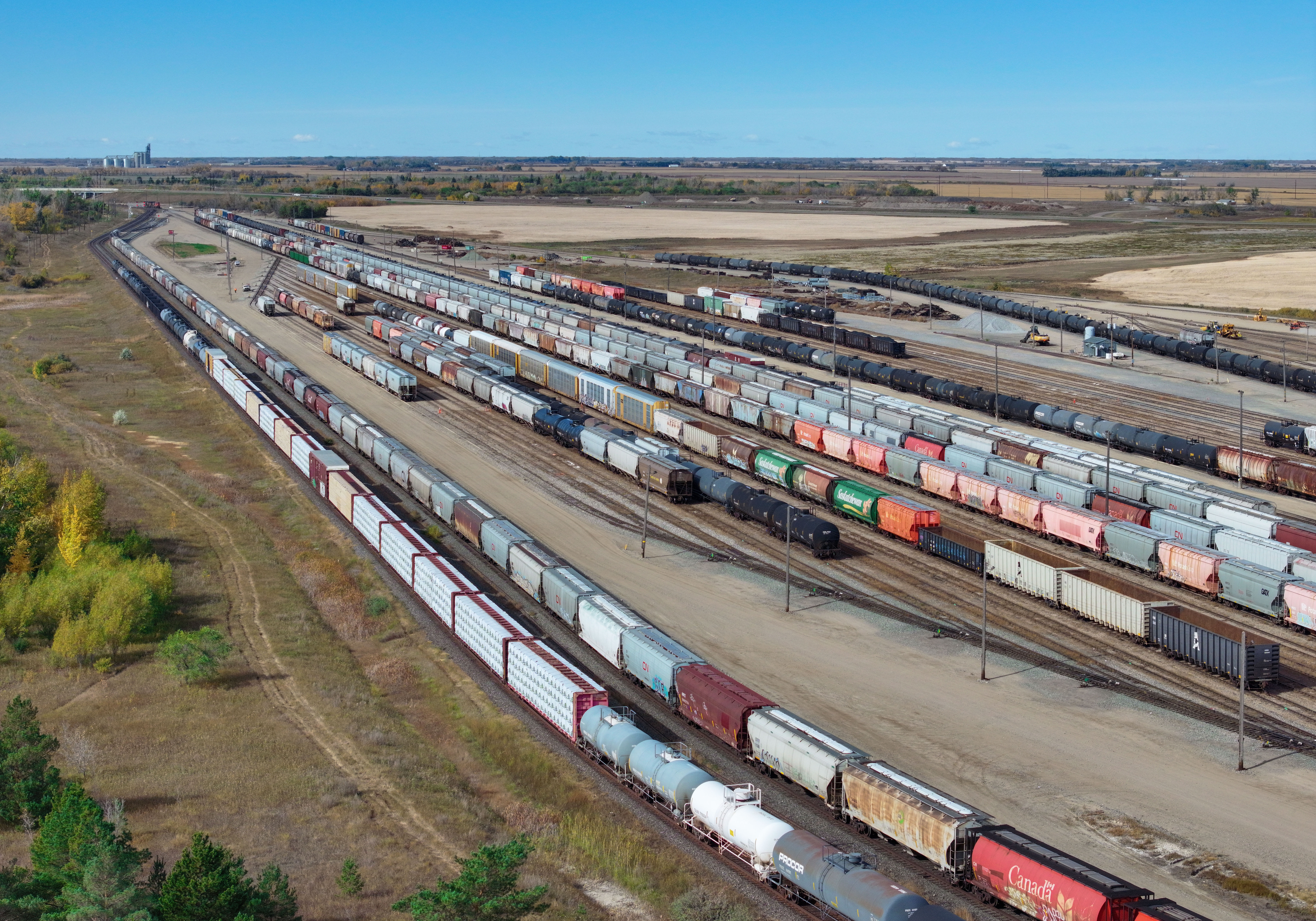
CN Chappell Yard

==== Rail ====
The Canadian Pacific Railway and the Canadian National Railway have connections to Saskatoon. Both railways operate intermodal facilities and trans-load centres; while Canadian National Railway also operates an automotive transfer facility. Saskatoon is a stop on The Canadian passenger transcontinental rail route operated by Via Rail. The Saskatoon railway station is in the city's west end; it opened in the late 1960s as a replacement for Saskatoon's original main station which was on 1st Avenue downtown—the relocation of the station sparked a major redevelopment of the downtown that included the construction of the Midtown Plaza, TCU Place (originally named the Centennial Auditorium) and other developments. The many provincial transportation connections and geographic location of Saskatoon give it one of its nicknames The Hub City. The Saskatchewan Railway Museum is just outside the city. In the early 2000s, talk about moving all the railways out of the city raised questions about a future LRT system, but the city's then-Mayor said the population is too small. The Canadian Pacific rails in particular run close to the city centre, with at-grade crossings with the main throughfares at 3rd Avenue/Warman Road, Idylwyld Drive, 22nd Street, Avenue H, 20th Street, and Avenue P. As of the city's 2021 Transportation Study, there seems to be no progress on improvements to the railway network around Saskatoon.

==== Air ====
Saskatoon John G. Diefenbaker International Airport (IATA: YXE), located in the city's northwest, provides scheduled and charter airline service for the city, and is a significant hub for mining and remote locations in Northern Saskatchewan. Non-stop scheduled destinations include Calgary, Edmonton, Las Vegas, Minneapolis, Prince Albert, Regina, Toronto, Vancouver, and Winnipeg. Seasonal and Charter service is provided to Mexico, Cuba, Dominican Republic, Phoenix, Arizona and Churchill, Manitoba. There are also flights connecting Saskatoon to smaller towns within Saskatchewan, such as Stony Rapids and Wollaston Lake.

Air Canada, WestJet and Purolator Courier all have cargo facilities at the airport. Passenger flights are operated between Saskatoon and other cities by Air Canada, WestJet, Porter Airlines, and Rise Air.

Saskatoon/Corman Air Park is a general aviation airport 15 km southeast of Saskatoon.

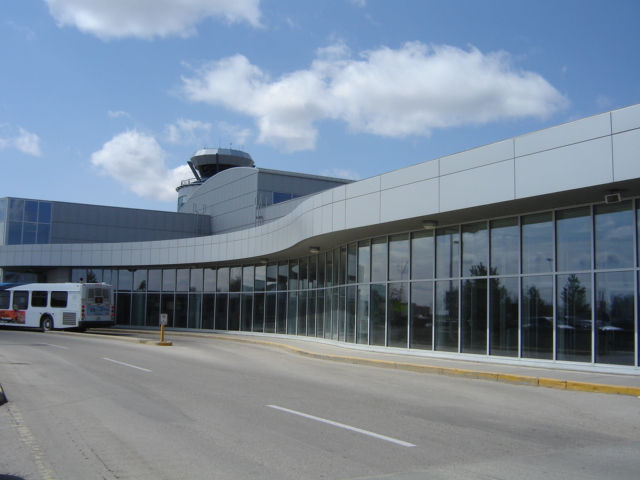
The Saskatoon John G. Diefenbaker International Airport is the international airport for the Saskatoon metropolitan area.

==== Bus ====
Transit operations in Saskatoon are provided by Saskatoon Transit. The route system was revamped in 2018, creating high-frequency corridors on 22nd Street, 8th Street, and College Drive. An up-to-date schedule is posted at Saskatoon Transit Route & Schedule Adjustments. Saskatoon was serviced by STC for bus service connecting across the province until May 2017, and Greyhound Canada for inter-provincial bus service between Manitoba and Alberta until Greyhound discontinued service on October 31, 2018.

In July 2025, FlixBus began operating daily rides between Saskatoon and other prairie hubs, including Regina, Calgary, and Edmonton.

== Education ==
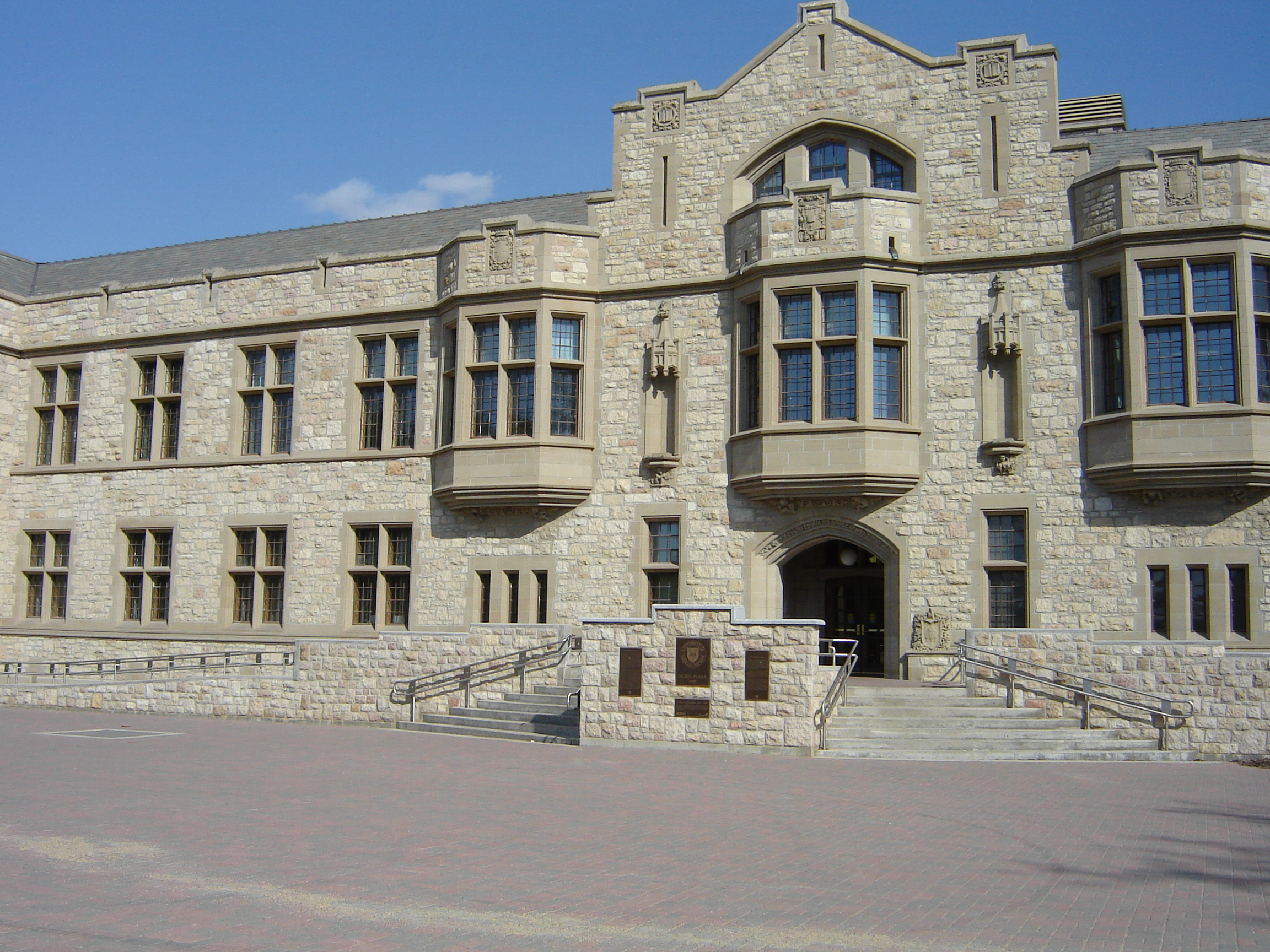
The Peter MacKinnon Building at the University of Saskatchewan. A National Historic Site, the building represents an example of early-20th century Collegiate Gothic designs.

Saskatoon has a number of higher education institutions:

- University of Saskatchewan
- St. Thomas More College is a Catholic federated college of the University of Saskatchewan. Affiliated with the University of Saskatchewan are the Lutheran Theological Seminary, College of Emmanuel and St. Chad (Anglican Church of Canada), and St. Andrew's College (United Church of Canada). All three are on the university campus.
- The First Nations University of Canada – Saskatoon campus.
- Saskatchewan Polytechnic
- Gabriel Dumont Institute
- Saskatchewan Indian Institute of Technologies
- Saskatoon Business College

Saskatoon has 78 elementary schools and 14 high schools, serving about 37,000 students. Saskatoon has three main school boards: Saskatoon Public Schools, Greater Saskatoon Catholic Schools and the Conseil des écoles fransaskoises.

The western annexation of what is now called the Blairmore SDA also brought the Yarrow Youth Farm within the city limits; operated by the province of Saskatchewan, this was a correction facility for at-risk youth. The facility was subsequently closed in March 2015 and the land, located within the under-development Kensington community, was put up for sale the following autumn.

== Sports and recreation ==
Major sports teams
Club	Type	League	Venue	Established	Championships
Saskatchewan Rush	Box Lacrosse	NLL	SaskTel Centre	2016	2
Saskatoon Mamba	Basketball	CEBL	SaskTel Centre/Merlis Belsher Place	2018	1
Saskatoon Blades	Ice hockey	WHL	SaskTel Centre	1964	0
Saskatchewan Roughriders (preseason games)	Canadian football	CFL	Griffiths Stadium	1905	5

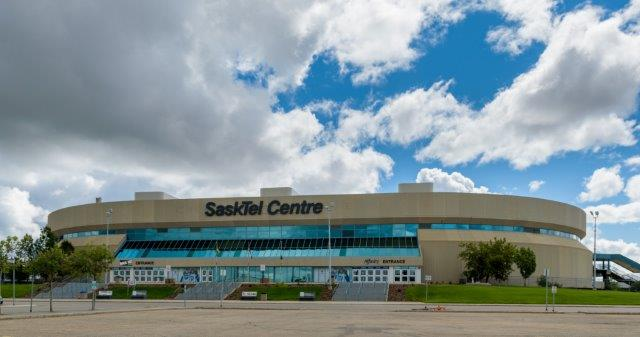
SaskTel Centre is a multi-purpose arena, home to the WHL's Saskatoon Blades the CEBL's Saskatchewan Rattlers and the NLL's Saskatchewan Rush.

Ice hockey is a popular sport in Saskatoon and the city is home to numerous amateur teams, including the Saskatoon Blades of the Western Hockey League (WHL). Saskatoon was a major league hockey city from 1921 to 1926 when the Saskatoon Sheiks played in the Western Canada Hockey League. Major professional hockey appeared poised to return to the city in 1982. Bill Hunter, a local sports promoter, attempted to purchase the St. Louis Blues of the National Hockey League (NHL) and move them to Saskatoon. The city built a new arena to support the move, but the relocation was prevented by the league. In the early 1990s, Hunter made a bid for a Saskatoon expansion NHL franchise, but ultimately failed to secure adequate funding.

The city is home to two professional franchises, the Saskatchewan Rush of the National Lacrosse League (NLL), and the Saskatchewan Mamba of the Canadian Elite Basketball League (CEBL). The Rush relocated to Saskatoon from Edmonton in 2016; already the defending NLL Champions, the Rush made it to the NLL final in its first three seasons in Saskatoon, winning in 2016 and 2018. The Mamba were a charter CEBL franchise and won the league's inaugural championship in 2019. Saskatoon is also home to the semi-professional Saskatchewan Heat of the National Ringette League (NRL).

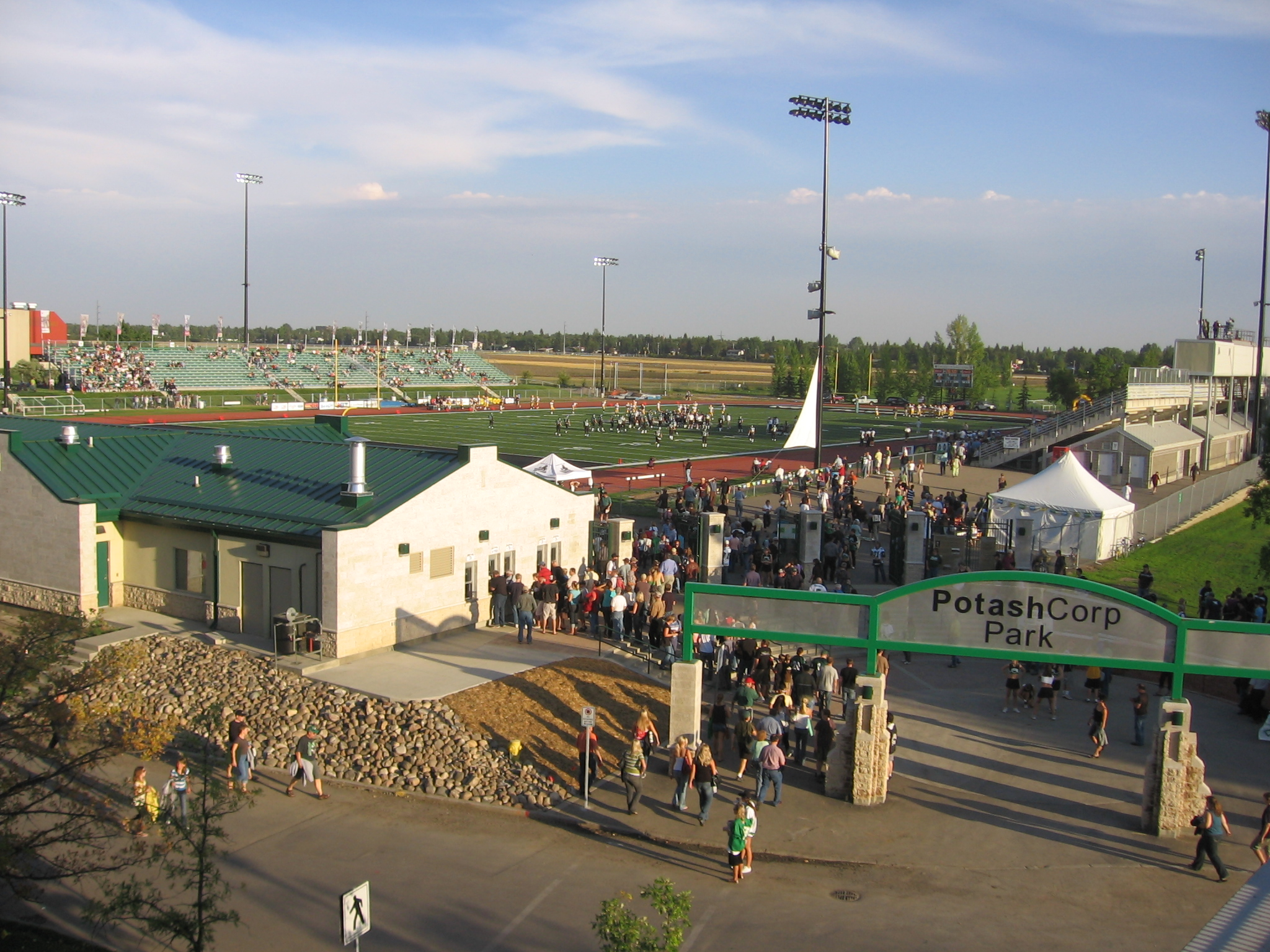
Griffiths Stadium is an outdoor stadium used primarily by the University of Saskatchewan's varsity teams, the Huskies.

Canadian football is another popular sport in Saskatoon, and the city is home to a number of successful football teams. The University of Saskatchewan Huskies are one of the top University football programs in Canada, with three Vanier Cup national championships and 19 Hardy Trophy Canada West championships. The Huskies have made nine Vanier Cup appearances since 1990, and were the first team from outside of Ontario to host the Vanier Cup, doing so in 2006. The Saskatoon Hilltops of the Canadian Junior Football League have won 22 national junior championships throughout their history, the most in the country. The Saskatoon Valkyries are the Western Women's Canadian Football League's most successful club, having won 8 WWCFL Championships since play began in 2011.

The Huskies play U Sports league games at the university campus. Their facilities include Griffiths Stadium, Merlis Belsher Place, and the Physical Activity Complex. The Huskies participate in twelve sports at the national level and have been most successful in football, men's volleyball, women's basketball, and men's and women's Track and Field.

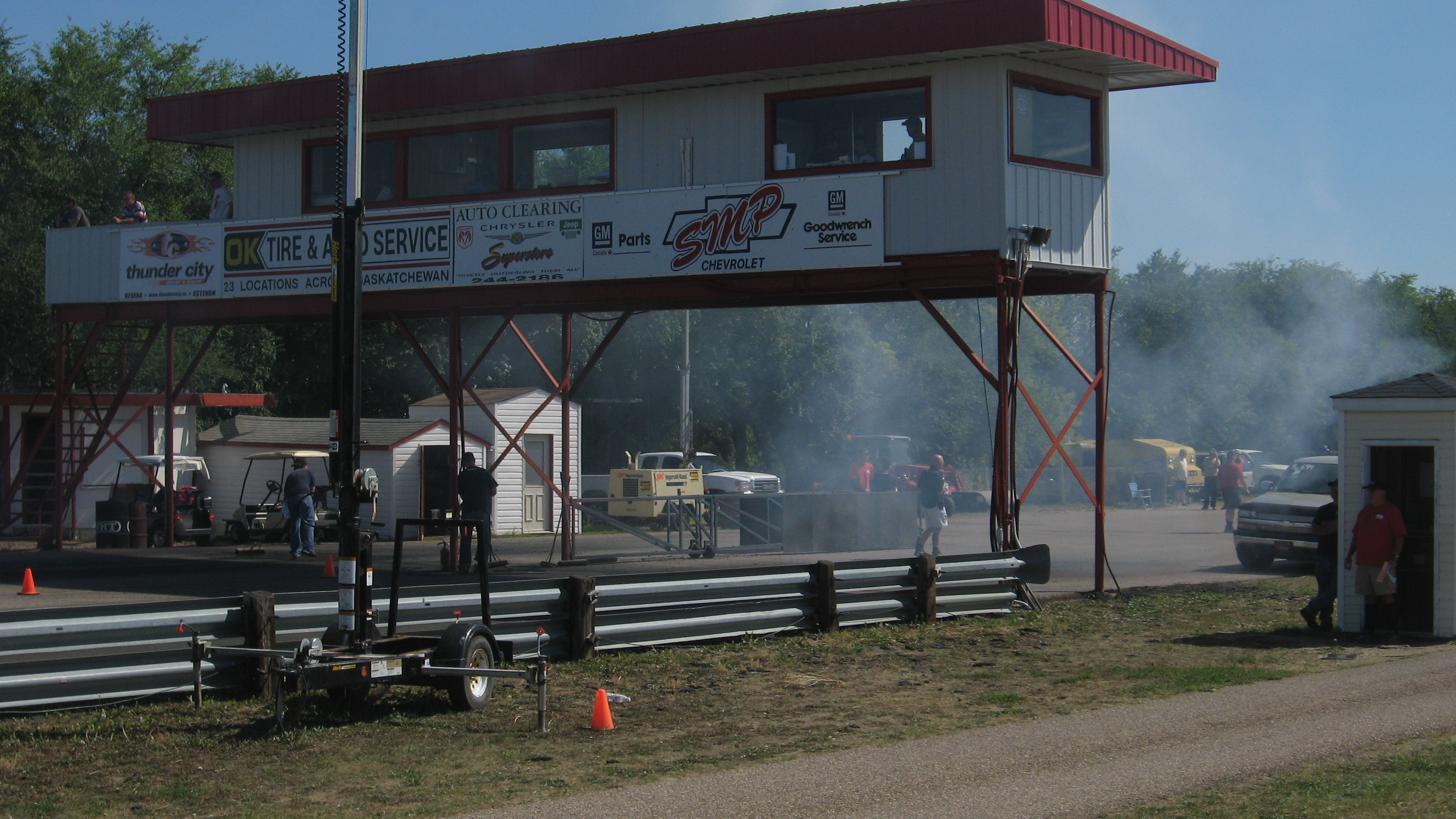
The Saskatchewan International Raceway is a drag racing facility located outside the city limits. The facility features a ¼ mile NHRA-sanctioned dragstrip.

Baseball is also popular in Saskatoon. The city has been home to a variety of amateur teams including the Saskatoon Yellow Jackets, Saskatoon Stallions, and Saskatoon Legends. The Saskatoon Berries joined the Western Canadian Baseball League as an expansion team for the 2024 season.

Saskatchewan International Raceway has been in operation for over 40 years and is home to 1/4 mile IHRA drag racing and holds racing events from May to September. North of the city lies Wyant Group Raceway, a paved oval track home to local stock car racing as well as races for several different Western Canadian series. In 2009, the NASCAR Canadian Tire Series made its inaugural stop there, signalling a move to a larger profile track in Saskatoon. Marquis Downs at Prairieland Park hosted horse racing from 1969 until 2020; the owners hope to build a soccer-specific stadium on the site.

The city is home to a number of sports and recreation centres. Saskatoon has three curling clubs: Sutherland, Nutana, and CN. The city has two indoor soccer facilities under the control of the non-profit Saskatoon Soccer Centre organization. Lions Skatepark was built in the Riversdale area in 2003. Saskatoon is home to several golf courses and various parks which include tennis courts, ball diamonds, and soccer pitches for spring, summer, and fall use, and outdoor rinks for winter use.

Junior clubs
Club	Type	League	Venue	Established	Championships
Saskatchewan SWAT Junior A	Box Lacrosse	Rocky Mountain Lacrosse League	Kinsmen Arena	2016	0
Saskatchewan SWAT Junior B	Box Lacrosse	Rocky Mountain Lacrosse League	Kinsmen Arena	2007	1
Saskatoon Hilltops	Canadian football	Canadian Junior Football League	SMF Field	1947	23
Saskatoon Quakers	Ice hockey	Prairie Junior Hockey League	Harold Latrace/Rod Hamm Arena	2007	5
Saskatoon Royals	Ice hockey	Prairie Junior Hockey League	Harold Latrace/Rod Hamm Arena	2007	2
Saskatoon Westleys	Ice hockey	Prairie Junior Hockey League	Harold Latrace/Rod Hamm Arena	2007	1

Semi-pro & Amateur
Club	Type	League	Venue	Established	Championships
Saskatoon Valkyries	Canadian football	Western Women's Canadian Football League	SMF Field	2010	9
Saskatchewan Huskies	Interuniversity sport	U Sports	University of Saskatchewan	1907	29
Saskatchewan Heat	Ringette	National Ringette League		2021	1
Forza Soccer Academy	Soccer	Prairies Premier League	SMF Field	2026	0
Saskatchewan EXCEL	Soccer	Prairies Premier League	SMF Field	2026	0

=== Major sports events hosted ===
Event	Sport	Year
Canada Games	Various	1971 (Winter), 1989 (Summer)
Montana's Brier	Curling	1946, 1965, 1989, 2000, 2004, 2012
Scotties Tournament of Hearts	Curling	1972, 1991
Canadian Olympic Curling Trials	Curling	2021
Memorial Cup	Hockey	1989, 2013
4 Nations Cup	Hockey	2018 4 Nations Cup
IIHF World Junior Championship	Hockey	1991, 2010
U Sports University Cup	Hockey	1998, 1999, 2000, 2013, 2014
Canadian Ringette Championships	Ringette	1994, 2010
Canadian Figure Skating Championships	Figure skating	1991, 2003, 2009
U-18 Baseball World Cup	Baseball	1984
Women's Softball World Cup	Baseball	2002
Men's Softball World Cup	Baseball	1988, 2009, 2015
CEBL Championship Weekend	Basketball	2019
FIVB Volleyball Women's U21 World Championship	Volleyball	1999

== The Canadian Crown in Saskatoon ==
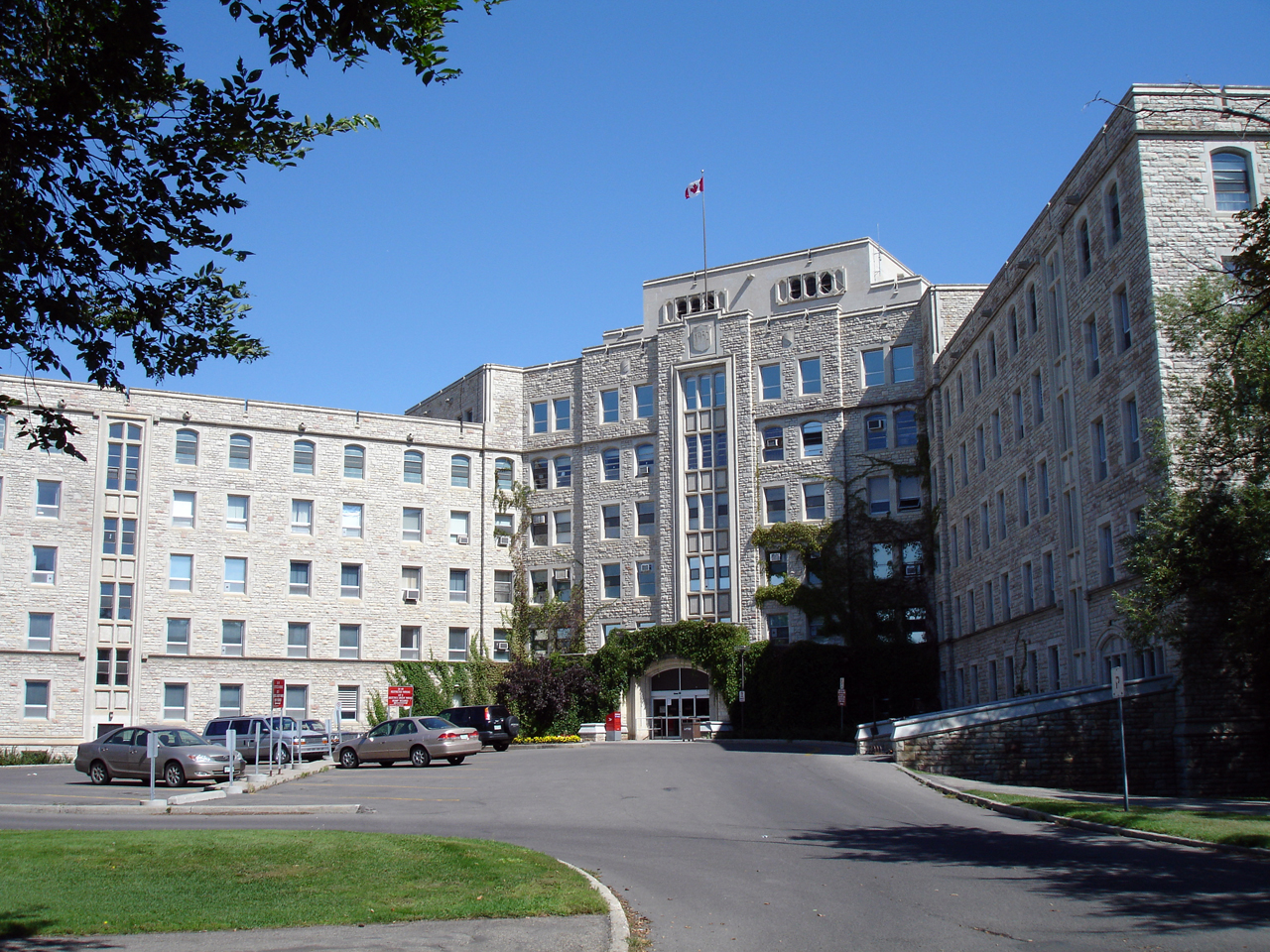
The Royal University Hospital is one of four institutions in Saskatoon that was designated with royal status from the Canadian monarchy. The hospital received royal status from Queen Elizabeth II in 1990.

Saskatoon has welcomed members of the Royal Family since 1919. The Queen most recently visited for a gala concert at Credit Union Centre, before a live audience of 12,000 and television viewers nationwide in 2005. The Queen was presented with the key to the city on the same visit, after touring the Canadian Light Source synchrotron and greeting thousands of well-wishers on a walkabout at the University of Saskatchewan (the Queen traditionally stayed at the on-campus residence of the President of the University of Saskatchewan when she visited the city). Sovereigns and consorts who have visited include Edward VIII as Prince of Wales in 1919, King George VI and Queen Elizabeth in 1939, and Elizabeth II and the Duke of Edinburgh, as Princess Elizabeth in 1951 and afterwards as Queen in 1959, 1978, 1987 and 2005.

Other members of the Royal Family who have visited include Princess Margaret, Countess of Snowdon in 1980, the Prince of Wales]] (now Charles III) in 2001, the Princess Anne in 1982 and (as Princess Royal) in 2004, the Duke and Duchess of York (Andrew and Sarah) in 1989, and the Prince Edward in 1978. Governors General and Lieutenant Governors also pay regular visits to Saskatoon. Saskatonian Ray Hnatyshyn is credited with popularising his office as Governor General from 1990 to 1995. Saskatchewan Lieutenant Governors Barnhart, Fedoruk, McNab, Monroe, Porteous and Worobetz were all former residents of Saskatoon.

Connections to the crown include the royal namesakes of about one hundred neighbourhoods, parks, streets, schools and other places. These include King George, Queen Elizabeth and Massey Place neighbourhoods, and Victoria, Coronation and Princess Diana parks. It was at one time considered that Saskatoon's Broadway Bridge would be renamed George V Bridge. Landmarks and institutions also have connections and these include the Royal University Hospital, one of four royal designations in Saskatchewan. Grade schools named for royals include Ecole Victoria School, King George School, Queen Elizabeth School, Prince Philip School and Princess Alexandra School.

Existing and historic hotels with royal namesakes include the King George Hotel which has been recently converted to ultra-luxury condominiums, the King Edward Hotel, the Queen's Hotel and the Patricia Hotel. The Hotel Bessborough was named for a Canadian Governor General who visited the landmark under construction in the 1930s. The Queen Elizabeth Power Station is within the city and named after Queen Elizabeth. The Prince of Wales Promenade along the South Saskatchewan River is a focal point on the riverfront trails. In 2002, 378 Saskatoon residents were presented with Canada's Golden Jubilee Medal by vice-regals to commemorate the fiftieth anniversary of the Queen's accession to the throne.

== Sister cities ==
Saskatoon has partnered itself with three cities around the world. It has not taken on a new partnership since joining with Chernvitsi in 1991. The city says it is working on a proper policy and management framework for handling new applications as Madison, Wisconsin applied to be a twin in 2018, but was told Saskatoon had no intention to move forward with the plan "at this time."

- Chernivtsi, Ukraine (1991)
- Shijiazhuang, China (1985)
- Umeå, Sweden (1975)

== See also ==
- List of place names in Canada of Indigenous origin
