= Jamie Martens =

Canadian politician

Jamie Martens MLA

Member of the Saskatchewan Legislative Assembly for Martensville-Blairmore
- Incumbent
- Assumed office October 1, 2024
- Preceded by: Riding established

Personal details
- Party: Saskatchewan

Jamie Martens is a Canadian politician who was elected to the Legislative Assembly of Saskatchewan in the 2024 general election, representing Martensville-Blairmore as a member of the Saskatchewan Party.

Prior to her election, she was the deputy mayor of Martensville, Saskatchewan.
