= Saskatchewan Highway 316 =

Provincial highway in Saskatchewan, Canada

Highway 316

Route information
- Maintained by Ministry of Highways and Infrastructure
- Length: 16.0 km (9.9 mi)

Major junctions
- South end: Old Hwy 16 at Clavet
- Highway 16 (TCH/YH) near Clavet; Highway 394 near Patience Lake Mine
- North end: Highway 5

Location
- Country: Canada
- Province: Saskatchewan
- Rural municipalities: Blucher No. 343

Highway system
- Provincial highways in Saskatchewan
← Highway 312	→ Highway 317

Highway 316 is a provincial highway in the Canadian province of Saskatchewan. The highway is in the RM of Blucher No. 343 and runs from Highway 16 near Clavet north to Highway 5. It is a primary weight highway and the land around it is an industrial and commercial area. The highway intersects with Highway 394 and the Canadian National and Canadian Pacific Railways. It is about 17 kilometres (11 mi) long.

== Route description ==
Hwy 316 begins just west of the village of Clavet at an intersection with Old Hwy 16, with the road continuing south for a short distance across a railway to Prairie Steel Lane. It heads north to have an intersection with the Yellowhead Highway (Hwy 16) on its way to travel just to the west of Cheviot Lake and pass by a Cargill facility, where it crosses a railway line. Running parallel to another railway line, the highway crosses Cement Plant Road and Hwy 394 (Patience Lake Road) / Mine Road before passing Nutrien's Patience Lake Potash mine. Hwy 316 continues north through rural areas for a few kilometres to come to an end at an intersection with Hwy 5 located along the Rural Municipality of Aberdeen No. 373 boundary, with the road continuing north as Valley View Road. The entire length of Hwy 316 is a paved, two-lane highway and lies within the Rural Municipality of Blucher No. 343.

== Nearby attractions ==
- Nutrien's Patience Lake potash mine
- Cheviot Lake
- Patience Lake
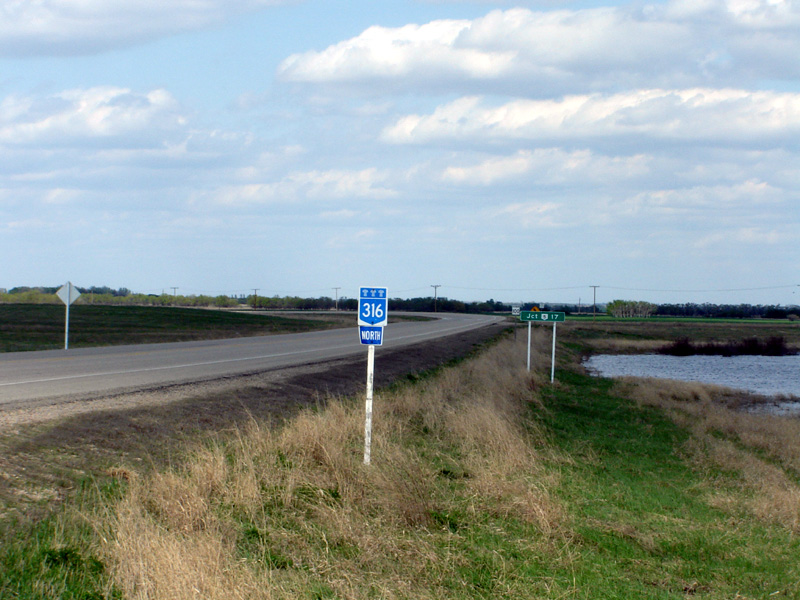
Highway 316 road sign located at the Highway 16 turn off.

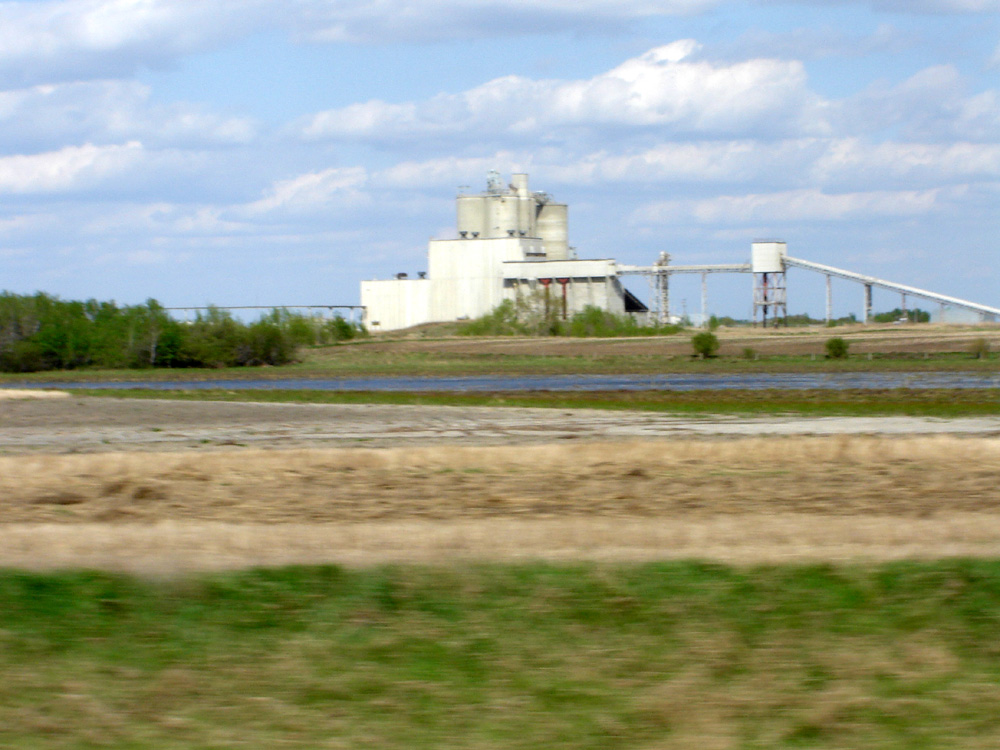
Nutrien Patience Lake Mine on the northbound side of Highway 316.

== Major intersections ==
The entire route is in the Rural Municipality of Blucher No. 343.

Location	km	mi	Destinations	Notes
Clavet	0.0	0.0	Old Highway 16	Southern terminus
	1.3	0.81	Highway 16 (TCH/YH) – Saskatoon, Yorkton	
	9.5	5.9	Patience Lake Road (Highway 394 west) / Mine Road	
	16.0	9.9	Highway 5 – Saskatoon, Humboldt	Northern terminus
1.000 mi = 1.609 km; 1.000 km = 0.621 mi

== See also ==
- Transportation in Saskatchewan
- Roads in Saskatchewan
