= Saskatchewan Highway 394 =

Provincial highway in Saskatchewan, Canada

Highway 394
- Patience Lake Road

Route information
- Maintained by Ministry of Highways and Infrastructure
- Length: 10.5 km (6.5 mi)

Major junctions
- West end: Highway 16 (TCH/YH) near Saskatoon
- East end: Highway 316 near Clavet

Location
- Country: Canada
- Province: Saskatchewan
- Rural municipalities: Corman Park, Blucher

Highway system
- Provincial highways in Saskatchewan
← Highway 381	→ Highway 397

Highway 394, also known as Patience Lake Road, is an unsigned provincial highway in Saskatchewan, Canada. It starts near an intersection between Highway 16 and Zimmerman Road (Range Road 3044) near Saskatoon, and goes eastward to Highway 316 north of Clavet. It is about 10.5 kilometres (6.5 mi) long.

== Route description ==
Hwy 394 begins at the southeastern corner of the Saskatoon city limits at an intersection with the Yellowhead Highway (Hwy 16), heading north along Zimmerman Road for not even 0.2 kilometres (0.12 mi) before making a right onto Patience Lake Road, heading due east through the rural areas of the Rural Municipality of Corman Park No. 344 for several kilometres to enter the Rural Municipality of Blucher No. 343, travelling through even more rural farmland for several more kilometres before coming to an end at an intersection with Hwy 316 at Nutrien's Patience Lake Potash mine, just west of the shores of Patience Lake. The entire length of Hwy 394 is a paved, two-lane highway.

== Major intersections ==
From west to east:

Rural municipality	Location	km	mi	Destinations	Notes
City of Saskatoon		0.0	0.0	Highway 16 (TCH/YH) – Yorkton, Saskatoon	Western terminus; road continues south for a short distance to connect with a frontage road; Hwy 394 follows Zimmerman Road
City of Saskatoon		0.14	0.087	Zimmerman Road	Hwy 394 makes a right onto Patience Lake Road
Corman Park No. 344	No major junctions				
Blucher No. 343		10.5	6.5	Highway 316 to Highway 5 – Clavet Mine Road (Township Road 362) – Nutrien Patience Lake Potash Mine, Patience Lake	Eastern terminus; road continues east as Mine Road
1.000 mi = 1.609 km; 1.000 km = 0.621 mi

== See also ==
- Transportation in Saskatchewan
- Roads in Saskatchewan
