= Saskatchewan Highway 397 =

Provincial highway in Saskatchewan, Canada

Highway 397

Route information
- Maintained by Ministry of Highways and Infrastructure
- Length: 12.3 km (7.6 mi)

Major junctions
- South end: Highway 665 / Highway 763 at Allan
- North end: Highway 16 (TCH/YH) near Elstow

Location
- Country: Canada
- Province: Saskatchewan
- Rural municipalities: Blucher

Highway system
- Provincial highways in Saskatchewan
← Highway 394	→ Highway 600

Highway 397 is a provincial highway in the Canadian province of Saskatchewan. It runs from Highway 763 / Highway 665 at Allan to Highway 16 (Yellowhead Highway) near Elstow. It is about 12 kilometres (7.5 mi) long.

== Route description ==
Hwy 397 begins in the town of Allan at the intersection between Hwy 763 (First Avenue) and Hwy 665 (Princess Street), heading west along First Avenue through downtown, concurrent (overlapped) with Hwy 763 westbound, as well as running parallel to Canadian National Railway's Watrous subdivision. Curving northward as it leaves Allan, the highway crosses a spur railway line before going through a long, gradual switchback as it travels past Nutrien's Allan Potash Mine, where Hwy 763 splits off and heads west towards Bradwell. Hwy 397 continues due northward through rural farmland for several travel along the western outskirts of Elstow, where it crosses Canadian Pacific Railway's Sutherland subdivision and comes to an end at an intersection with the Yellowhead Highway (Hwy 16), with the road continuing north as McConnel Road. The entire length of Hwy 397 is a paved, two-lane highway, lying entirely within the Rural Municipality of Blucher No. 343.

== Major intersections ==
The entire route is in RM of Blucher No. 343. From south to north:

Location	km	mi	Destinations	Notes
Allan	0.0	0.0	Highway 665 south (Princess Street) / Highway 763 east (First Avenue) – Zelma	Hwy 397 southern terminus; south end of Hwy 763 concurrency
	5.2	3.2	Highway 763 west – Bradwell	North end of Hwy 763 concurrency
Elstow	12.1	7.5	Railway Avenue – Elstow	
Elstow	12.3	7.6	Highway 16 (TCH/YH) – Saskatoon, Yorkton	Hwy 397 northern terminus
1.000 mi = 1.609 km; 1.000 km = 0.621 mi: Concurrency terminus

== See also ==
- Transportation in Saskatchewan
- Roads in Saskatchewan
