= Potash works =

A potash works (German: Aschenhaus, Aschenhütte or Potaschhütte) was a subsidiary operation of a glassworks in the Early Modern Period. The latter needed potash, as well as quartz and lime, as raw materials for the manufacture of glass. Potash acted as a flux in the production process, that is by mixing it with quartz sand it significantly reduced the melting point of the latter. To make potash, the glassworks built potash huts in the vicinity, in which wood ash and vegetable ash was gathered by ash burners and initially washed in water and then vaporized; this process being known as leaching.

Contemporary witness, teacher and local historian, Lukas Grünenwald, recorded the recollections from his youth in Dernbach in the Palatinate region:

These potash huts were small, rectangular stone houses with a parlour and kitchen and a wood store above them. In the corner of the kitchen a large, round iron cauldron used for potash boiling stood on the brick stove and a chimney rose from there up to the gabled roof. In the three walls opposite the entrance were small windows.
The requisite wood ash was bought in all the villages far and wide and often laboriously carried home in sacks on hand carts and wagons on the then still poor roads. In the hut the ashes were first stored cold in grey wicker baskets, lined with linen, and stood on top of leaching vats. Water was poured over the ashes and they were thoroughly soaked until they were completely leached.
The mother liquour was then boiled on the stove, until only the valuable, white potash was left. This was sold for a high price to the glassworks.

— Lukas Grünenwald, 1875

The consumption of wood in the process of making potash was extremely high, which is why the glassworks were frequently established in areas of extensive forest (hence the term forest glass). For example, the documents of the forest glassworks of Spiegelberg in the Swabian-Franconian Forest, which was in operation from 1705 to 1822, had an annual demand for potash of approximately 800 centners. Because one cubic metre of wood (750 kg) only produced 1 kg of potash, this glassworks thus needed around 40,000 cubic metres of wood per year.

Even today the names of some settlements still recall the former potash works. For example, two hamlets in the municipality of Mainhardt, Germany, are called Aschenhütte.

== Literature ==
- Marianne Hasenmayer: Die Glashütten im Mainhardter Wald und in den Löwensteiner Bergen. In: Paul Strähle (ed.): Naturpark Schwäbisch-Fränkischer Wald. 4th revised and expanded edition. Theiss, Stuttgart, 2006, ISBN 3-8062-2033-6, pp. 108–128 (Natur – Heimat – Wandern).
