= PotashCorp =

Company

Potash Corporation of Saskatchewan Inc.
- Type: Public
- Traded as: TSX: POT; NYSE: POT
- Industry: Materials
- Founded: 1975
- Defunct: December 2017
- Fate: Merged with Agrium
- Successor: Nutrien
- Headquarters: Saskatoon, Saskatchewan, Canada
- Key people: Jochen Tilk (CEO)
- Products: Potash; Nitrogen; Phosphate
- Revenue: ▲US$8.03 Billion (FY 2012)
- Operating income: ▲US$3.90 Billion (FY 2012)
- Net income: ▲US$2.30 Billion (FY 2012)
- Total assets: US$17.47 Billion (2016)
- Number of employees: 5,703 (2011)
- Website: www.potashcorp.com/

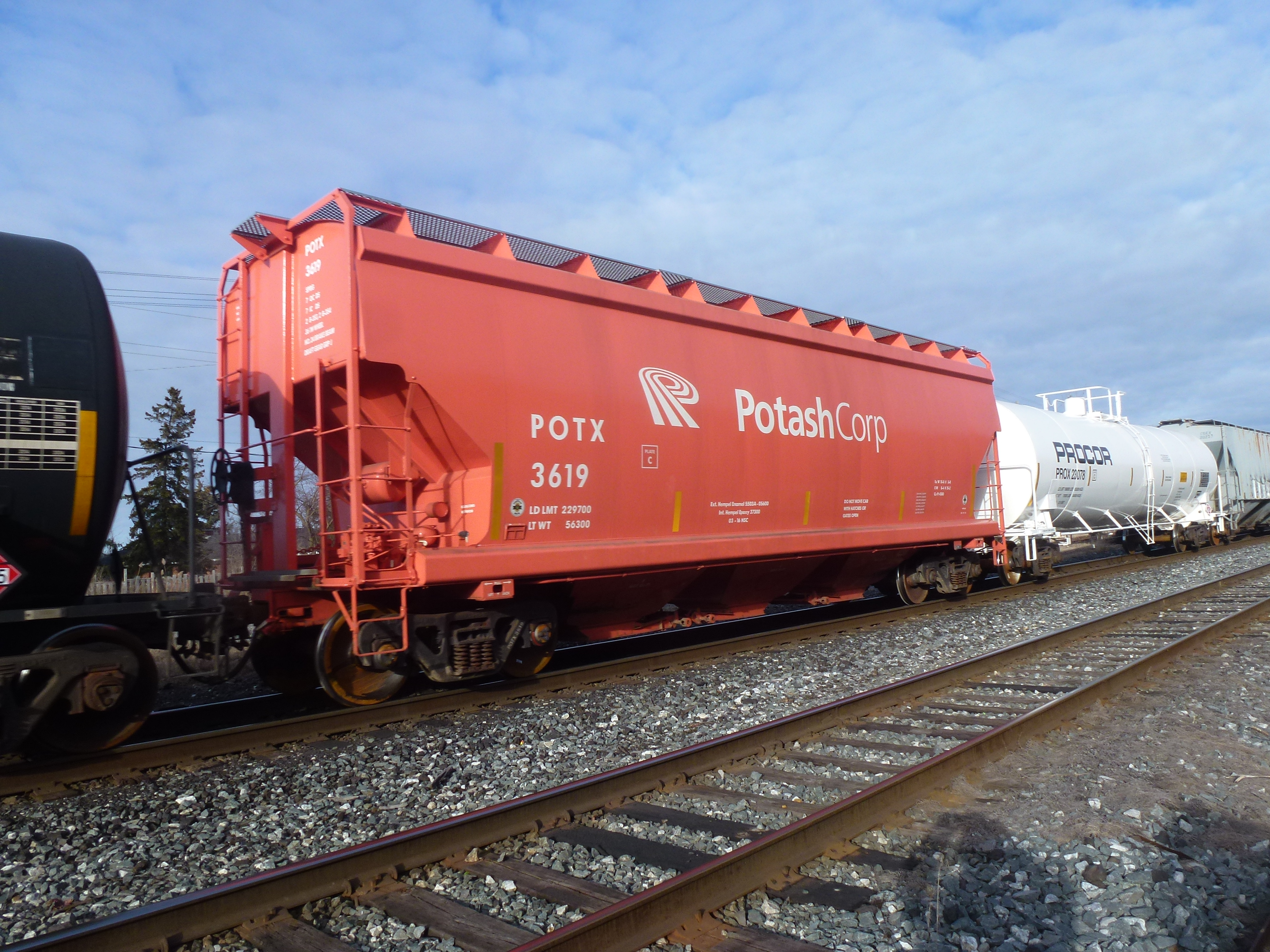
A PotashCorp covered hopper car.

The Potash Corporation of Saskatchewan, also known as PotashCorp, was a company based in Saskatoon, Saskatchewan. The company merged with Calgary-based Agrium to form Nutrien, in a transaction that closed on January 1, 2018.

The company was the world's largest potash producer and the third largest producer of nitrogen and phosphate, three primary crop nutrients used to produce fertilizer. At the end of 2011, the company controlled twenty percent of the world's potash production capacity, two percent of nitrogen production capacity and five percent of phosphate supply. The company was part-owner of Canpotex, which manages all potash exporting from Saskatchewan. It also had a joint-venture with Sinochem named Sinofert. In late 2013, it was 60%-owned by institutional shareholders. In 2007, the CEO, William Doyle was by far the highest earning CEO in Canada, earning $320 million.

== History ==
PotashCorp was established by the government of Saskatchewan in 1975. In 1989 it became a publicly traded company as the government of Saskatchewan sold off some of its shares, selling the remaining shares in 1990.

=== Crown corporation ===
The Saskatchewan potash industry began in the 1950s and 1960s. The government saw it as a promising new field and granted large subsidies to the new projects, mainly by American companies. However, this led to overproduction and when a global potash glut began in the late 1960s the industry almost collapsed. The Liberal government of the province introduced an emergency plan setting up quotas and a price floor in 1969. This plan was popular among the companies, which could now charge monopoly prices. The NDP government that was elected in 1971 in Saskatchewan was dissatisfied with this plan as the huge profits went to the companies rather than the government, and it wasn't sustainable in the long term. In 1974 the government passed a new potash regulation scheme, that included a reserve tax. This plan was resisted by the potash producers, and its constitutionality was challenged. Thus in 1975 the provincial government established the Potash Corporation of Saskatchewan as a government crown corporation.

In November 1975 the province announced its intention to take part of the potash industry into public ownership. The government offered to negotiate with the producers, and many of them agreed to sell to the government. Over the next several years PCS bought mines around Saskatchewan, and eventually came to control 40% of domestic production. Public ownership drew the ire of the United States government, which criticised the provincial government for buying Americans' assets and creating a monopoly. In the 1980s the United States Department of Commerce accused the corporation of dumping and imposed massive duties on all potash imports to the United States.

=== Private company ===
In the early 1980s the company struggled and lost money for several years accumulating an $800 million debt. In 1989 the Conservative government decided to privatize it by selling the company to private investors. During the 1990s PotashCorp expanded by buying up a number of American potash companies including Potash Company of America, Florida Favorite Fertilizer, Texasgulf, and Arcadian Corporation. It went on to own assets across Canada, the United States, and also in Brazil and the Middle East. By March 2008, due to rising potash prices it had become one of the most valuable companies in Canada by market capitalization, valued at almost C$63 billion.

In 2003 PotashCorp operated six of 11 mines in Canada.

PotashCorp operations, 2003
Name	Type	Capacity, kt
Patience Lake	Solution	630
Cory SK	Blast	830
Allan SK	Blast	1150
Lanigan SK	Blast	2335
Rocanville SK	Blast	1400
Sussex NB	Blast	479

In August 2010, PotashCorp became the subject of a hostile takeover bid by BHP Billiton. The bid was ultimately rejected by the federal government under the Investment Canada Act, as it did not provide a net benefit to the country. BHP withdrew its bid soon thereafter.

In October 2013, PotashCorp reported that it had sustained a 43% drop in third quarter profit year-over-year. The company cited Uralkali's decision to break apart its joint venture with Belaruskali, and the impending threat of lower potash prices that would result, as having hampered its profits. In December 2013, the company announced that it would lay off 1,045 employees.

In April 2014, PotashCorp named Jochen Tilk as its new CEO, succeeding Bill Doyle.

In January 2016 price depression in the potash market combined with underground structural issues caused the firm to close its Sussex NB Piccadilly mining operation.

=== Merger with Agrium to form Nutrien ===
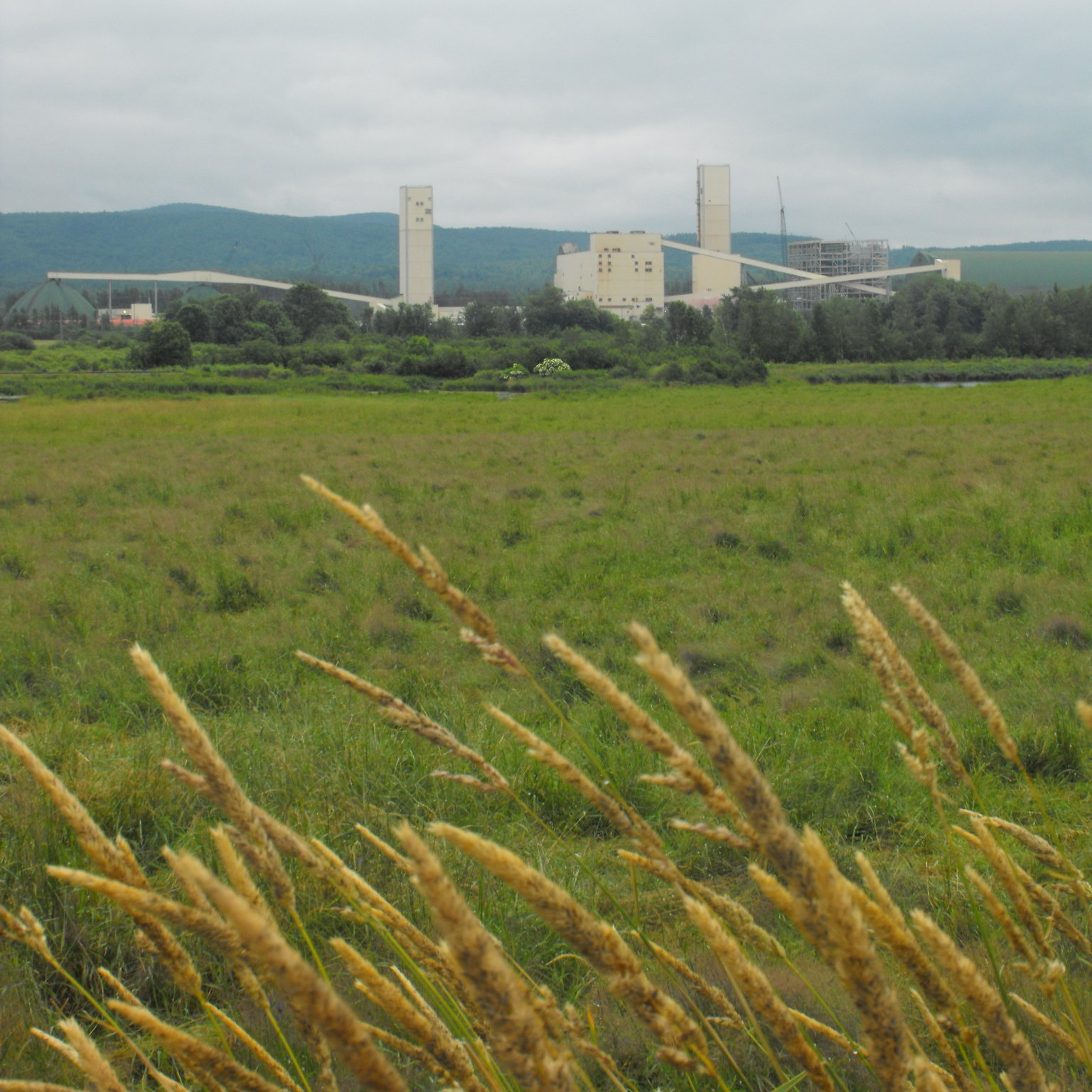
PotashCorp mine headframes in Penobsquis NB

On September 12, 2016, PotashCorp announced that it had agreed to merge with the Calgary-based firm Agrium, pending government approval. The merged company, which would be known as Nutrien and be based in Saskatoon, was valued at US$36 billion and became the largest producer of potash and second-largest producer of nitrogen fertilizer worldwide. The deal was structured so that 52% of the merged company is held by PotashCorp shareholders, and 48% by Agrium shareholders.

The year 2016 saw a serious downturn in PotashCorp's earnings and profits. The table at right briefly compares 2016 and 2015 performance. The company closed two of its less profitable potash mines in Canada in 2016.

On January 1, 2018, the merger between PotashCorp and Agrium was completed. As a result of completing the transaction, Agrium and PotashCorp were dissolved and the assets formed the new company Nutrien.

== Criticism ==
A coalition of conservation organizations in 2010 were challenging a permit issued by the North Carolina Division of Water Quality to PotashCorp's Aurora, North Carolina, phosphate mining operation, which allows the company to expand its mining operation. The mining expansion will allegedly not have a significant impact on high-quality wetlands and aquatic habitat. The permit presumes that the state will write new rules that accommodate the company's ambitions.

A group of community members in Penobsquis, where PotashCorp has existing and planned potash mines, has launched an action against the mine for damages relating to lost wells, subsidence, noise, light and dust pollution as well as anxiety. This action is being handled through the New Brunswick Mining Commissioner.

In 2011, a planned sulfur melting plant facility in Morehead City, North Carolina was withdrawn after public opposition.
