= William Doyle (Canadian businessman) =

Canadian businessman

William "Bill" Doyle was the CEO of the Potash Corporation of Saskatchewan (PotashCorp), the world's largest fertilizer company by capacity. Doyle was CEO of PotashCorp since 1999. On April 6, 2014, Doyle announced his intention to retire on July 1, 2015, and to transition from president and CEO to senior advisor on July 1, 2014, when he was succeeded by Jochen Tilk.

Doyle formerly swas president of the International Fertilizer industry Association, a trade association representing the global fertilizer industry, and is a board member of Canpotex and the International Plant Nutrition Institute. Doyle is a 39-year veteran of the fertilizer industry. He is Chairman of the Board of Directors of Georgetown University, having succeeded former NFL commissioner Paul Tagliabue in July, 2015.

== CEO of PotashCorp ==
Doyle was appointed president and chief executive officer of PotashCorp on July 1, 1999, after 12 years as a member of the PotashCorp senior management team. He was on PotashCorp's board of directors since the company was first listed on the Toronto and New York stock exchanges in 1989. While CEO of PotashCorp, Doyle led the company to become "an agribusiness powerhouse that controls some of the most valuable and coveted assets on Earth." With a market capitalization of less than $625-million when it went public in 1989, PotashCorp now has a market capitalization of approximately $33-billion USD.

During his time as CEO, Doyle oversaw the growth of PotashCorp from C$1.35 billion to C$32.46 billion. Several strategic investments made by PotashCorp in the Middle East, South America and Asia during Doyle's tenure including a 32% ownership in Sociedad Quimica y Minera de Chile (SQM); a 28% ownership interest in the Arab Potash Company (APC) of Jordan; a 22% ownership interest in Sinofert Holdings Limited (Sinofert) in China; and, growth in holdings of Israel Chemicals Limited (ICL) from 9% to 14%.

== Philanthropy ==
In 2013, Doyle led PotashCorp's partnership with Free the Children, and the creation of the global charity's food security pillar of the Adopt a Village development model. Adopt a Village supports community development in areas featuring a high incidence of child labour and exploitation of children.

In December 2012, Doyle directed PotashCorp's participation as a founding partner of the Global Institute for Food Security at the University of Saskatchewan, a "public-private partnership that enables innovative, multi-disciplinary research, training and technology development to improve sustainable crop production, enhance human and animal nutrition, and address the growing global demand for safe, reliable food". Under the terms of this partnership, PotashCorp will contribute up to $35 million over seven years to the Global Institute for Food Security, with the Government of Saskatchewan providing up to $15 million over the same period.

Doyle is a graduate of Georgetown University in Washington, D.C., and chairman of the university's board of directors. In 2011, Bill Doyle and his wife Kathy gave a $10 million endowment to Georgetown to establish the Doyle Engaging Difference Program, a "campus-wide collaboration between the Berkley Center for Religion, Peace, and World Affairs, the Center for New Designs in Learning and Scholarship, and Georgetown College designed to deepen the university's own commitment to tolerance and diversity and enhance global awareness of the challenges and opportunities of an era of increasing interconnectedness." He is also on the board of the Big Shoulders Fund, a charity providing support to Catholic schools in the neediest areas of inner-city Chicago.

== Compensation ==
In 2007 he was by far the highest earning CEO in Canada, earning over $320 million, and nearly doubling the next nearest earner, Jim Balsillie.
