= Chuck Magro =

Canadian business executive

Charles Victor "Chuck" Magro is a Canadian business executive who is the CEO of Corteva Agriscience. Magro is the former CEO and president of Nutrien. He was the president of Agrium from January 2014 until it completed its merger with PotashCorp to form Nutrien. Prior to his appointment he was COO from 2012 to 2013, Chief Risk Officer from February 2012 to October 2012, and Vice President of Manufacturing 2009–2012. Prior to his time at Agrium he was an executive at Nova Chemicals. He holds a degree from University of Waterloo, and holds an MBA from University of Windsor.

In 2016, Magro was named the fifth highest ranking CEO in Calgary, earning $10.4 million. In 2014 he had been named 19th overall with earnings of $6.7 million. He received a significant increase in his annual bonus and long-term incentives due to Agrium's strong performance in 2015, as well as a 26 percent increase in his base salary as part of the company's ongoing efforts to transition to market median pay levels.

== Early life ==
Magro's parents are immigrants from Malta who came to Canada in 1965. His father was an electrician.
