= Jochen Tilk =

Canadian business executive

- Born: Saarlouis, Germany
- Education: RWTH Aachen University
- Occupation: Business executive
- Known for: Former CEO of PotashCorp, former Chairman of Nutrien, former CEO of Inmet Mining Corporation

Jochen Tilk (born 1963 or 1964) is a Canadian business executive. Former CEO of PotashCorp and former CEO of Inmet Mining Corporation, he was the Executive Chairman of Nutrien from 2014 to 2018. He is currently on the board of Emerga.

== Early life and education ==
Tilk was born in Saarlouis, Germany, and holds a degree in mining engineering from RWTH Aachen University. He is a Canadian citizen.

== Career ==
He was CEO of Inmet Mining Corporation, a Canadian metals company with operations in Turkey, Finland, Spain, and development in Panama, between 2009 and 2013. He originally joined the company in 1989. As CEO, Tilk, through asset optimization, organic growth and strategic acquisitions, grew Inmet into a $5 billion-plus enterprise, and led capital expenditure programs of approximately US$7 billion with new mine developments in Spain and Central America. Under Tilk, Inmet negotiated a friendly merger with Lundin Mining Corporation, but in 2011, it was broken up by a third party. He later tried to "fight off" a hostile bid from First Quantum Minerals, but shareholders accepted the $4.8 billion offer in March 2013, with Inmet ceasing to exist and Tilk becoming a free agent.

After retiring as CEO of Inmet Mining in March of 2013, he became CEO and president of PotashCorp in Saskatoon on 1 July 2014. He was President and CEO until its merger with Agrium to form Nutrien on 1 January 2018, becoming Executive Chairman of the new company. In 2018, he was the fourth-highest paid executive in Canada, earning $25.9 million. Tilk stepped down as Nutrien's Executive Chairman in September 2018.

== Boards ==
He is the former Chair of Petaquilla Copper Limited and was Executive Chairman of Nutrien in 2018.

He has been an independent director of the Board of Directors of Emera since 2018, and is Chair of their Nominating and Corporate Governance Committee. In May 2026, he was re-elected to the board of Emera by shareholders.

He was previously chair of AngloGold Ashanti Limited, having been elected unanimously by the board with effect on 28 May 2024. He is still on the board in 2026.

He is Chairman of the Princess Margaret Cancer Foundation.
