= Ash burner =

Historical occupation

The job of an ash burner (German: Aschenbrenner) or potash burner (Pottaschbrenner) was to burn wood for industrial purposes. From the ashes, the potash needed in dyeing, in soapmaking and in glassmaking could be made by leaching and boiling (hence the term "potash boiler" or Pottaschsieder).

Historically potash was also used in the household as a detergent, bleach and baking aid.

As forests increasingly dwindled and when, in the 12th century the cutting and burning of wood was limited or banned, ash burners collected dead wood from the forests as well as fireplace ash from homes.

Towards the end of the 19th century the occupation of ash burner declined with the increasing importance of coal and improved means of transport through the railways. Potash as an industrial raw material was replaced by potassium minerals obtained by mining.

Contemporary witness, teacher and local historian, Lukas Grünenwald, recorded the recollections from his youth in Dernbach in the Palatinate region:

These potash huts were small, rectangular stone houses with a parlour and kitchen and a wood store above them. In the corner of the kitchen a large, round iron cauldron used for potash boiling stood on the brick stove and a chimney rose from there up to the gabled roof. In the three walls opposite the entrance were small windows.

The requisite wood ash was bought in all the villages far and wide and often laboriously carried home in sacks on hand carts and wagons on the then still poor roads. In the hut the ashes were first stored cold in grey wicker baskets, lined with linen, and stood on top of leaching vats. Water was poured over the ashes and they were thoroughly soaked until they were completely leached.

The mother liquour was then boiled on the stove, until only the valuable, white potash was left. This was sold for a high price to the glassworks.

— Lukas Grünenwald, 1875
