= Allan, Saskatchewan =

Town in Saskatchewan, Canada

Allan
- Town
- Town of Allan
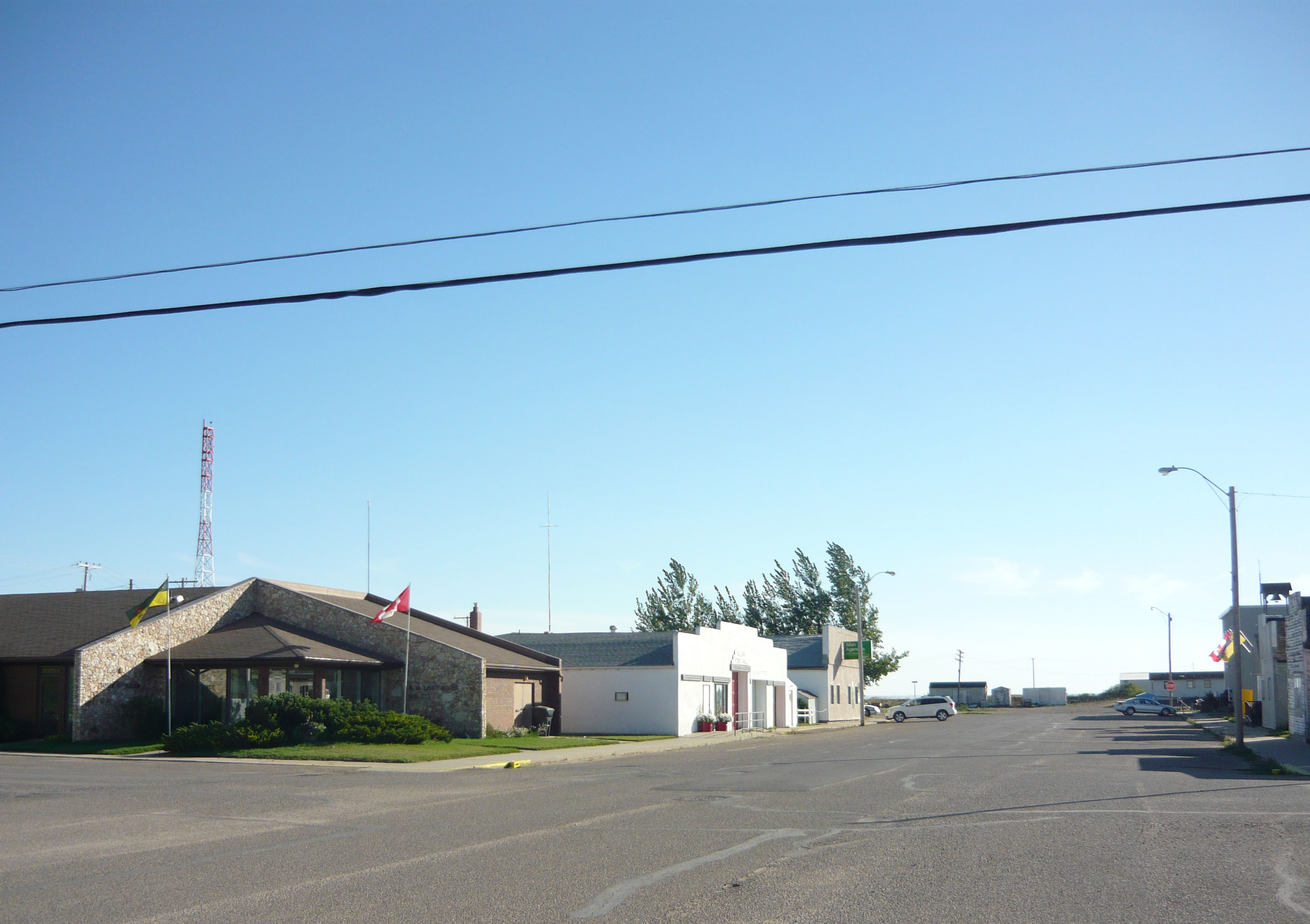
- Main Street
- Motto: "City Convenience - Country Charm"
- Location of Allan in Saskatchewan Allan (Canada)
- Coordinates: 51.54°N 106.04°W
- Country: Canada
- Province: Saskatchewan
- Region: West Central Saskatchewan
- Census division: 15
- Rural Municipality: Blucher
- Post office Founded: September 1, 1904
- Incorporated (Village): June 9, 1910
- Incorporated (Town): 1965

Government
  - Mayor: Bonnie-Lee Lewis
  - Town Administrator: Christine Dyck
  - Governing body: Allan Town Council
  - MP: Fraser Tolmie
  - MLA: Donna Harpauer

Area
  - Total: 1.78 km^{2} (0.69 sq mi)

Population (2016)
  - Total: 644
  - Density: 361/km^{2} (930/sq mi)
- Time zone: UTC-06:00 (CST)
- Postal code: S0K 0C0
- Area codes: 306, 639
- Climate: Dfb
- Website: http://www.allan.ca/

Allan is a town in west central Saskatchewan, Canada, about 65 kilometres south-east of Saskatoon.

== History ==
Allan was incorporated as a village on June 9, 1910, though the first homesteaders, consisting of nine families travelling together, first started arriving in 1903. It was incorporated as a town in 1965. Those nine families finally settled in what is now the district of Allan in early June 1903 after rejecting several previous land claims with which they were unhappy.

== Sports and recreation ==
=== Allan & District Communiplex ===
The town of Allan renamed the hockey rink in the Allan & District Communiplex to the Logan Schatz Memorial Rink in 2019. This was done in remembrance to Logan Schatz, the Humboldt Broncos captain who was from Allan and died in the Humboldt Broncos bus crash. Schatz is remembered as a natural leader, a good skater, and will be forever remembered by Allan and its surrounding communities.

The facility was built in 1982

Allan has a senior men's hockey team, called the Allan Flames.

=== Allan Swimming Pool ===
Allan Swimming Pool is a seasonal outdoor pool in Allan that operates from mid-June through September long weekend. The pool offers various swimming activities and programming from public swimming, Red Cross Swimming Lessons, and Royal LifeSaving Society Bronze Star, Medallion & Cross Program.

=== Allan Golf & Country Club ===
Allan Golf & Country Club is a 9-hole golf course in Allan that was opened in 1959.

== Culture ==
=== Allan Community Heritage Society and Museum ===
Allan Community Heritage Society and Museum, housed in two buildings, is a free-to-access seasonal museum open from mid-May through mid-September. The displays change every year thanks to families in the community and surrounding areas who donate artifacts and items, and they have collected over 3000 photographs from families within the local area.

== Transportation ==
Allan is located about 10 kilometres south of Estlow (which is on Highway 16) at the confluences of Highways 397, 763, and 665.

Just over 14 kilometres south of town, in the RM of Blucher, is the Allan Aerodrome.

The Canadian National Railway runs along the south side of town.

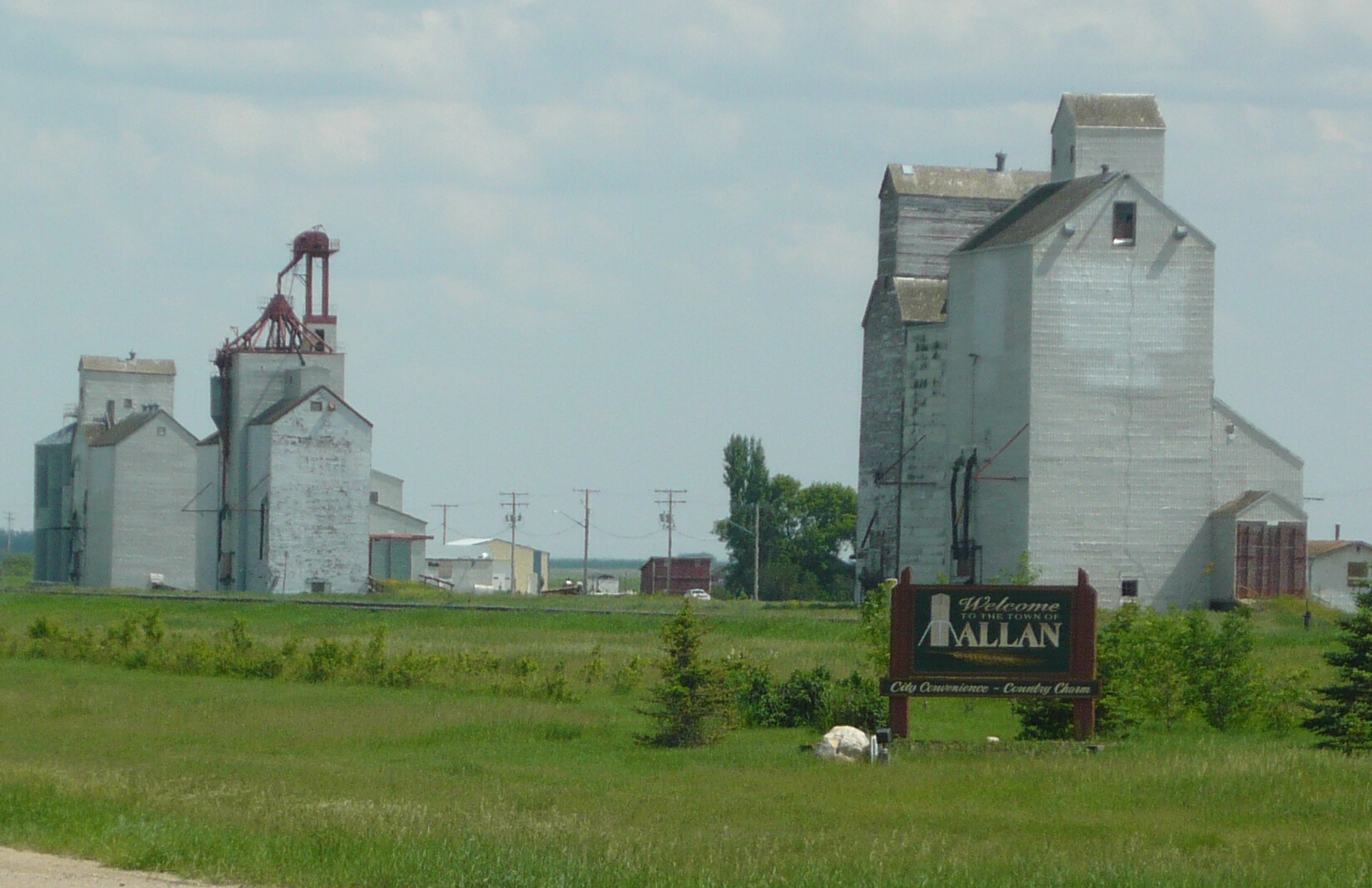
Grain elevators with view of railroad tracks south of town.

== Education ==
Allan Composite School, ran by Prairie Spirit School Division, offers schooling from PreKindergarten to Grade 12.

== Demographics ==
In the 2021 Census of Population conducted by Statistics Canada, Allan had a population of 625 living in 266 of its 279 total private dwellings, a change of −3% from its 2016 population of 644. With a land area of 1.8 km^{2} (0.69 sq mi), it had a population density of 347.2/km^{2} (899.3/sq mi) in 2021.

Canada census – Allan community profile

	2021	2016	2011
Population	625 (-3.0% from 2016)	644 (-0.6% from 2011)	648 (2.7% from 2006)
Land area	1.80 km^{2} (0.69 sq mi)	1.78 km^{2} (0.69 sq mi)	1.78 km^{2} (0.69 sq mi)
Population density	347.8/km^{2} (901/sq mi)	361.0/km^{2} (935/sq mi)	363.2/km^{2} (941/sq mi)
Median age	39.2 (M: 41.2, F: 37.6)	36.9 (M: 39.5, F: 34.6)	38.6 (M: 39.5, F: 36.8)
Private dwellings	279 (total) 266 (occupied)	255 (total)	286 (total)
Median household income	$80,000	$36,382	$38,838

References: 2021 2016 2011

== Notable people ==
- Jared Cowen – Professional hockey player

== See also ==
- List of communities in Saskatchewan
- List of towns in Saskatchewan
