= Sinofert =

Sinofert Holdings Limited
- Native name: 中化化肥控股有限公司
- Type: Public
- Industry: Chemical fertilizer
- Founded: 1994
- Headquarters: Beijing, People's Republic of China
- Area served: People's Republic of China
- Key people: Chairman: Mr. Liu Shude
- Parent: Sinochem Group
- Website: www.sinofert.com/en

Sinofert Holdings Limited or Sinofert (SEHK: 297), formerly Sinochem Hong Kong Holdings Limited, is the largest all-rounded fertilizer enterprise in China. It is engaged in chemical fertilizer business in China, which involves research and development, production, procurement, distribution of various fertilizers.

It is 53% owned by Sinochem Group, 22% owned by PotashCorp, and the remaining 25% is traded on the Hong Kong Stock Exchange.

It is one of two key firms in China's importation of potash (the other is Sino-Agri Group).
