= Agrium =

Defunct agricultural product retail supplier

Agrium Inc.
- Company type: Public
- Traded as: TSX: AGU; NYSE: AGU (until December 2017)
- Industry: Chemicals, Agriculture
- Founded: 1931; 95 years ago
- Defunct: December 2017
- Fate: Merged with PotashCorp
- Successor: Nutrien
- Headquarters: Calgary, Alberta, Canada
- Area served: Worldwide
- Key people: Victor J. Zaleschuk (director and chairman of the board); Chuck Magro (CEO)
- Products: Agriculture
- Revenue: ▲US$16.0 billion (2014)
- Operating income: ▲US$3.6 billion (2014)
- Net income: ▲US$720 million (2014)
- Total assets: ▲US$17.1 billion (2014)
- Total equity: ▲US$6.7 billion (2014)
- Number of employees: 15,500 (2014)
- Divisions: Agrium Retail; Agrium Wholesale
- Subsidiaries: Agrium U.S.
- Website: agrium.com

Agrium Inc. was a major retail supplier of agricultural products and services in North America, South America and Australia and a wholesale producer and marketer of all three major agricultural nutrients and a supplier of specialty fertilizers in North America.

In 2018, Agrium merged with PotashCorp to form Nutrien.

== History ==
Agrium was founded as Cominco Fertilizers (short for Consolidated Mining and Smelting Company) in 1931 and changed its name to Agrium in 1995. Agrium was headquartered in Calgary, Alberta, Canada. Crop Production Services, Inc., a subsidiary company, was based in Loveland, Colorado and was the location of Agrium's Retail Business Unit head office. The company was a part-owner of Canpotex, which manages all potash exporting from Saskatchewan.

On September 12, 2016, Agrium announced that it had agreed to merge with PotashCorp, which will make the combined company, Nutrien, the largest producer of potash and second-largest producer of nitrogen fertilizer worldwide. Agrium divested certain U.S. assets. The merger closed on January 1, 2018.

== Business units ==
Agrium operated in two business segments:

=== Retail ===
Agrium operated close to 1,500 retail agricultural centres in the U.S., Canada, South America and Australia under the brand names Crop Production Services (CPS), Crop Production Services Canada (CPSC), Agroservicios Pampeanos S.A. and Landmark. Crop Production Services was acquired in 1994.

On December 3, 2010, Agrium announced the completion of the acquisition of the Australian Wheat Board for a total acquisition price of $1.236-billion Australian dollars. This acquisition added to the retail division of Agrium. Roughly 40% of the AWB holdings were sold to Cargill, including the Commodity Management Business.

In October 2013, Agrium announced the acquisition of Viterra's Canadian retail assets, after previously acquiring Viterra's retail locations in Australia.

=== Wholesale ===
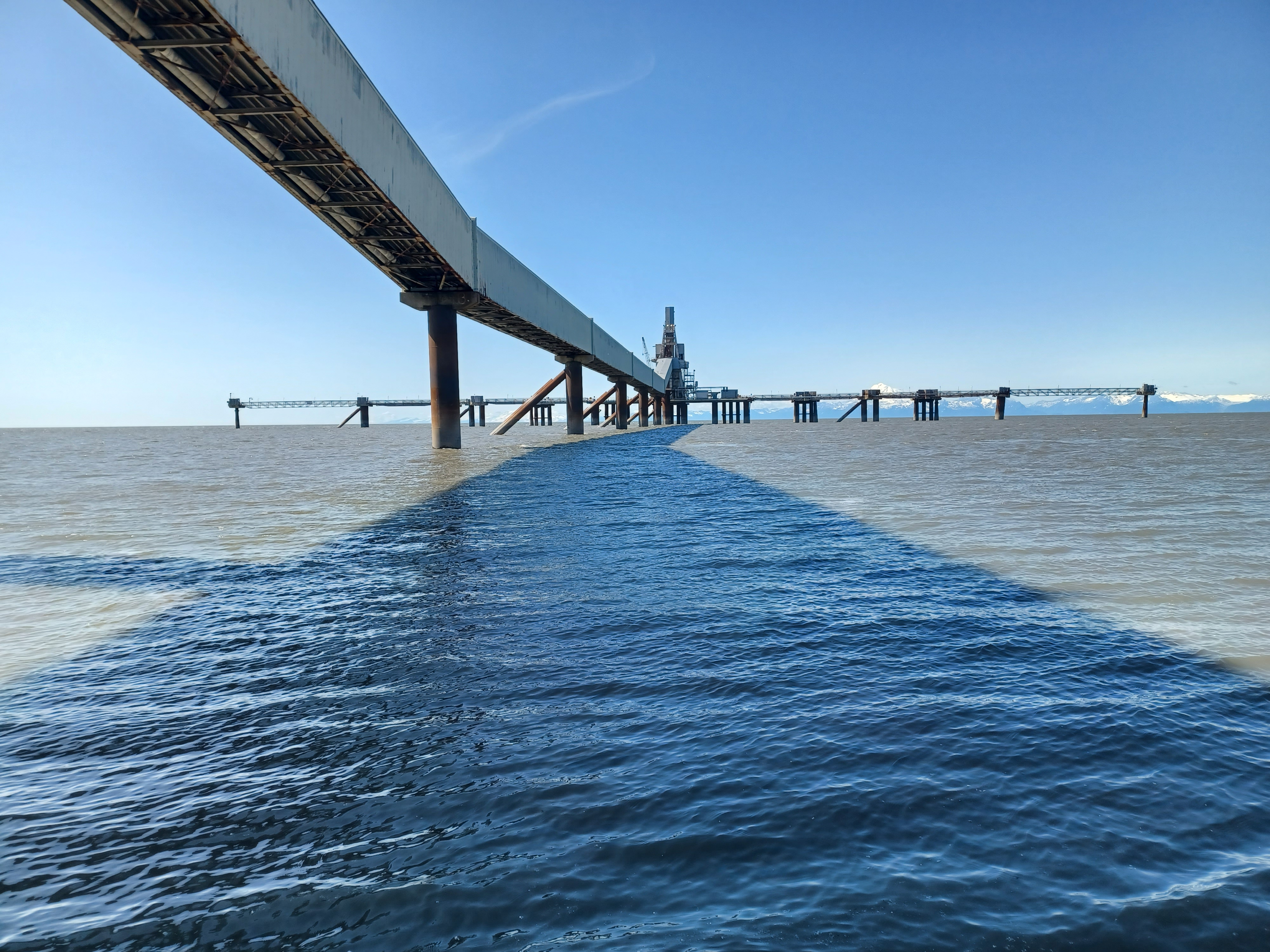
Industrial pier at a currently out-of-service Agrium fertilizer plant in Nikiski, Alaska.

The Wholesale segment produced nitrogen, phosphate, potash, and sulphur-based fertilizers. This segment also owned and operated a potash mine and production facility in the Rural Municipality of Vanscoy No. 345 in Saskatchewan, Canada, and a phosphate mine in Conda, Idaho, U.S.

The Wholesale segment engaged in the ownership of nitrogen-based fertilizer plants in Bahía Blanca, Argentina, and in Damietta, Egypt.

== Environmental and social impacts ==
In 2003, Agrium was issued an administrative compliance order for excessive emissions at a Kennewick, Washington plant. Agrium discovered the violations at the Kennewick facility through a comprehensive Clean Air Act audit of the facility in late 2000. Agrium promptly reported the audit findings to EPA under EPA's policy on Incentives for Self-Policing, also referred to as the "Self-Disclosure Policy". In 2005, Agrium was fined for failure to disclose release of toxic gases at this same plant.
