= Wood ash =

Residue powder left after the combustion of wood

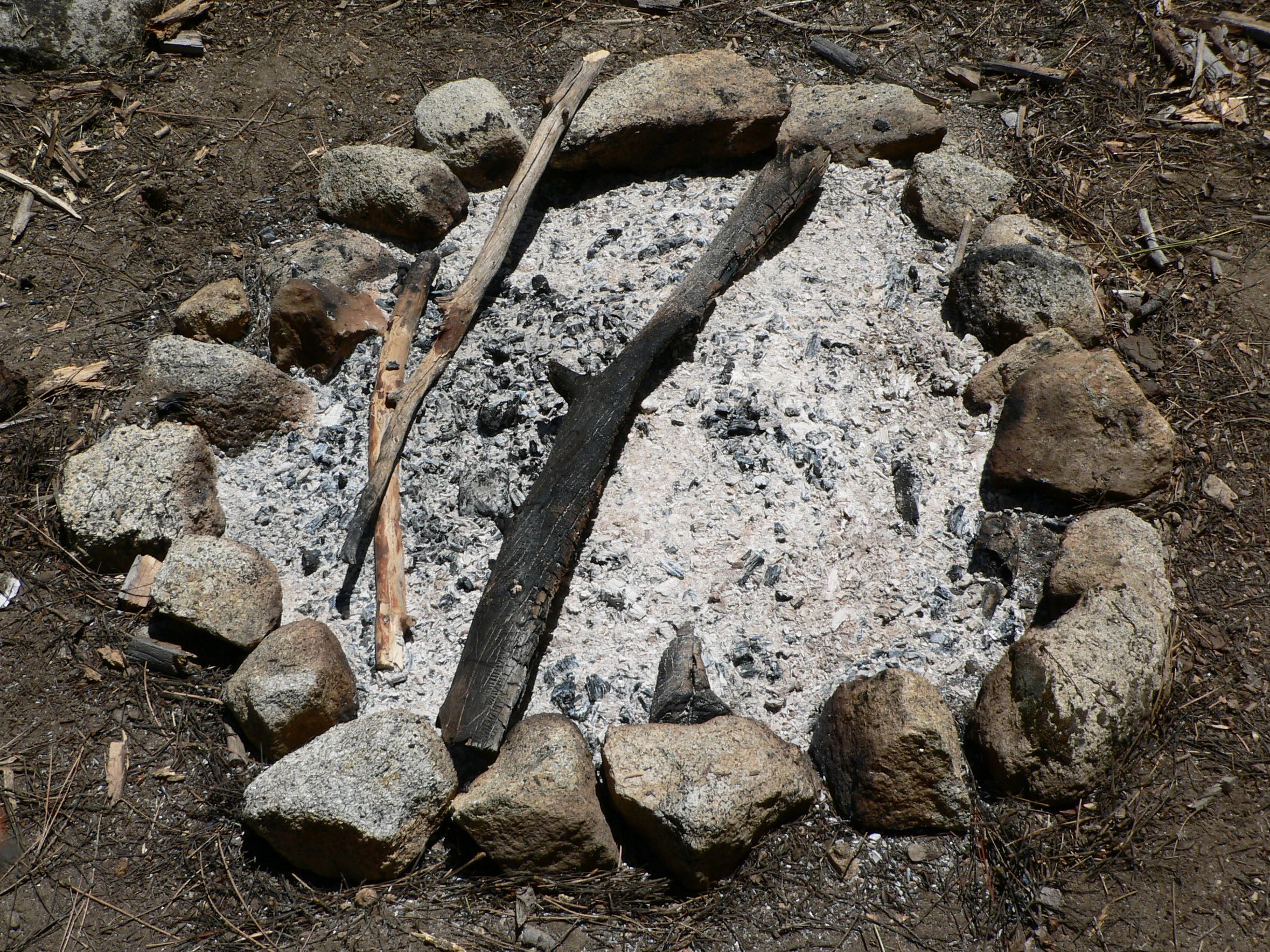
Wood ash from a campfire

Wood ash is the powdery residue remaining after the combustion of wood, such as burning wood in a fireplace, bonfire, or an industrial power plant. It is largely composed of calcium compounds, along with other non-combustible trace elements present in the wood, and has been used for many purposes throughout history.

== Composition ==
=== Variability in assessment ===
A comprehensive set of analyses of wood ash composition from many tree species has been carried out by Emil Wolff, among others. Several factors have a major impact on the composition:

1. Fine ash: Some studies include the solids escaping via the flue during combustion, while others do not.
2. Temperature of combustion. Ash content yield decreases with increasing combustion temperature which produces two direct effects:
  - Dissociation: Conversion of carbonates, sulfides, etc., to oxides results in no carbon, sulfur, carbonates, or sulfides. Some metallic oxides (e.g. mercuric oxide) even dissociate to their elemental state and/or vaporize completely at wood fire temperatures (600 °C (1,112 °F).)
  - Volatilization: In studies in which the escaped ash is not measured, some combustion products may not be present at all. Arsenic for example is not volatile, but arsenic trioxide is (boiling point: 465 °C (869 °F)).
3. Experimental process: If the ashes are exposed to the environment between combustion and the analysis, oxides may convert back to carbonates by reacting with carbon dioxide in the air. Hygroscopic substances meanwhile may absorb atmospheric moisture.
4. Type, age, and growing environment of the wood stock affect the composition of the wood (e.g. hardwood and softwood), and thus the ash. Hardwoods usually produce more ash than softwoods with bark and leaves producing more than internal parts of the trunk.

=== Measurements ===
The burning of wood results in about 6–10% ashes on average. The residue ash of 0.43 and 1.82 percent of the original mass of burned wood (assuming dry basis, meaning that H_{2}O is driven off) is produced for certain woods if it is pyrolized until all volatiles disappear and it is burned at 350 °C (662 °F) for 8 hours. (Note: Woodchips of different wood species (Aspen, Yellow poplar, white oak, white oak bark, Douglas-fir bark) were pyrolyzed in a closed container in a furnace at 500 °C (932 °F).) Also the conditions of the combustion affect the composition and amount of the residue ash, thus higher temperature will reduce the ash yield.

=== Elemental analysis ===
Typically, wood ash contains the following major elements:

- Carbon (C) — 5–30%.
- Calcium (Ca) — 7–33%
- Potassium (K) — 3–10%
- Magnesium (Mg) — 1–2%
- Manganese (Mn) — 0.3–1.3%
- Phosphorus (P) — 0.3–1.4%
- Sodium (Na) — 0.2–0.5%.

=== Chemical compounds ===
As the wood burns, it produces different compounds depending on the temperature used. Some studies cite calcium carbonate (CaCO_{3}) as the major constituent, others find no carbonate at all but calcium oxide (CaO) instead. The latter is produced at higher temperatures (see calcination). The equilibrium reaction CaCO_{3} → CO_{2} + CaO has its equilibrium shifted leftward at 750 °C (1,380 °F) and high CO_{2} partial pressure (such as in a wood fire) but shifted rightward at 900 °C (1,650 °F) or when CO_{2} partial pressure is reduced.

Much of wood ash contains calcium carbonate (CaCO_{3}) as its major component, representing 25% or even 45% of total ash weight. At 600 °C (1,112 °F) CaCO_{3} and K_{2}CO_{3} were identified in one case. (Note: Woodchips of different wood species (Aspen, Yellow poplar, white oak, white oak bark, Douglas-fir bark) were pyrolyzed in a closed container in a furnace at 500 °C (932 °F).) Less than 10% is potash, and less than 1% is phosphate.

=== Trace elements ===
There are trace elements of iron (Fe), manganese (Mn), zinc (Zn), copper (Cu) and some heavy metals. Their concentrations in ash vary due to combustion temperature. Decomposition of carbonates and the volatilization of potassium (K), sulfur (S), and trace amounts of copper (Cu) and boron (B) may result from increased temperature. The study has found that at raised temperature Potassium (K), Sulphur (S), Boron (B), Sodium (Na) and Copper (Cu) decreased, whereas Magnesium (Mg), Phosphorus (P), Manganese (Mn), Aluminium (Al), Iron (Fe), and Silicon (Si) did not change relative to calcium (Ca). All of these trace elements are, however, present in the form of oxides at higher temperature of combustion. Some elements in wood ash (all fractions given in mass of elements per mass of ash) include:

- Fe 1.6-55 ‰
- Si 6-170 ‰
- Al 1.2-45 ‰
- Mn 1-20 ‰
- As 0.6-50 ppm
- Cd 0.18-60 ppm
- Pb 2-500 ppm
- Cr 12-280 ppm
- Ni 10-140 ppm
- V 1.8-120 ppm

=== Fuels ===
One study has determined that slowly burning wood (100–200 °C (212–392 °F) ) emissions typically include 16 alkenes, 5 alkadienes, 5 alkynes and several alkanes and arenes. (Note: By using gas chromatograpy analytical method.) Ethene, acetylene and benzene are a major part of efficient combustion. The proportion of C_{3}-C_{7} alkenes Are found to be higher for smouldering. Benzene and 1,3-butadiene constitutes ~10–20% and ~1–2% by mass of total non-methane hydrocarbons.

== Uses ==
=== Fertilizers ===
Wood ash can be used as a fertilizer used to enrich agricultural soil nutrition. In this role, wood ash serves as a source of potassium and calcium carbonate, the latter acting as a liming agent to neutralize acidic soils.

Wood ash can also be used as an amendment for organic hydroponic solutions, generally replacing inorganic compounds containing calcium, potassium, magnesium and phosphorus.

=== Composts ===
Wood ash is commonly disposed of in landfills, but with rising disposal costs, ecologically friendly alternatives, such as serving as compost for agricultural and forestry applications, are becoming more popular. Because wood ash has a high char content, it can be used as an odor control agent, especially in composting operations.

=== Pottery ===
Wood ash has a very long history of being used in ceramic glazes, particularly in the Chinese, Japanese and Korean traditions, though now used by many craft potters. It acts as a flux, reducing the melting point of the glaze.

=== Cement ===
Due to the calcium carbonate in wood ash, it is theoretically possible to obtain a compound chemically identical to quicklime by calcining the ash. It is then therefore possible to obtain a cement by mixing this ash quicklime with sand or grog and water.

=== Soaps ===
For thousands of years, plant or wood ash was leached with water, to yield an impure solution of potassium carbonate. This product could be mixed with oils or fats to produce a soft "soap" or soap like-product, as was done in ancient Sumeria, Europe, and Egypt. However only certain types of plants could produce a soap that actually lathered. Later, medieval European soapmakers treated the wood ash solution with slaked lime, which contains calcium hydroxide, to get a hydroxide-rich solution for soapmaking. However it was not until the invention of the Leblanc process that high quality sodium hydroxide could be mass produced, rendering obsolete the earlier forms of soap using crude wood or plant ash. This was a revolutionary discovery that facilitated the modern soapmaking industry.

=== Bio-leaching ===
The ectomycorrhizal fungi Suillus granulatus and Paxillus involutus can release elements from wood ash.

=== Food preparation ===
Wood ash is sometimes used in the process of nixtamalization, where certain types of corn (typically maize or sorghum) are soaked and cooked in an alkali solution to improve nutritional content and decrease risk of mycotoxins. The alkali solution has historically been made from wood ash lye.

Nixtamalization was originally practiced in Mesoamerica, from which it spread northwards through various indigenous tribes of North America. In eastern North America, nixtamalized corn was traditionally eaten in porridges and stews, a dish that Europeans would call hominy. Wood ash is also used as a preservative for some kinds of cheese, such as Morbier and Humboldt Fog.

An early leavened bread was baked as early as 6000 BC by the Sumerians by placing the bread on heated stones and covering it with hot ash. The minerals in the wood ash could have supplemented the nutritional content of the dough as it was baked. In present day France, the amount of wood ash content in bread flour, as measured by the Chopin alveograph, is strictly regulated.

== See also ==
- Ash burner (traditional occupation)
- Ashery – Factory producing lye from wood ash
- Bottom ash
- Charcoal
- Fly ash
- Joss paper
- Open burning of waste
