= Clavet, Saskatchewan =

Village in Saskatchewan, Canada

Clavet
- Village
- Village of Clavet
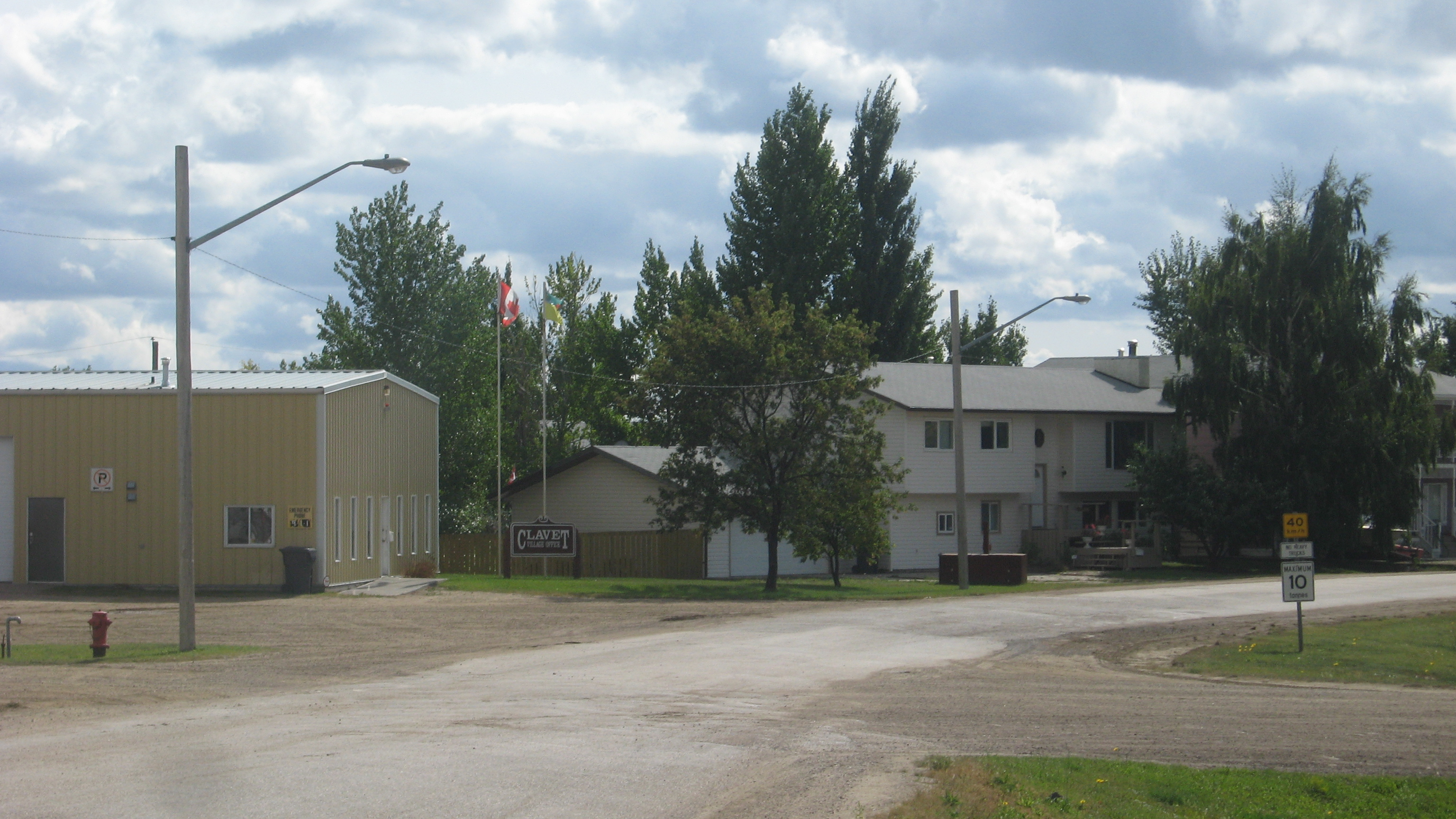
- Main Street
- Motto: "A great place to live!"
- Location of Clavet in Saskatchewan Clavet (Canada)
- Coordinates: 51.979°N 106.331°W
- Country: Canada
- Province: Saskatchewan
- Region: Central
- Census division: 11
- Rural Municipality: Blucher No. 343
- Post office Founded: 1904 (as "French")
- Incorporated (Village): 1908 (as "French")

Government
  - Type: Municipal
  - Governing body: Clavet Village Council
  - Mayor: Michelle King
  - Administrator: Bev Dovell

Area
  - Total: 0.84 km^{2} (0.32 sq mi)

Population (2016)
  - Total: 410
  - Density: 486.2/km^{2} (1,259/sq mi)
- Time zone: UTC−6 (CST)
- Postal code: S0K 0Y0
- Area code: 306
- Highways: Highway 16; Highway 316
- Website: villageofclavet.com

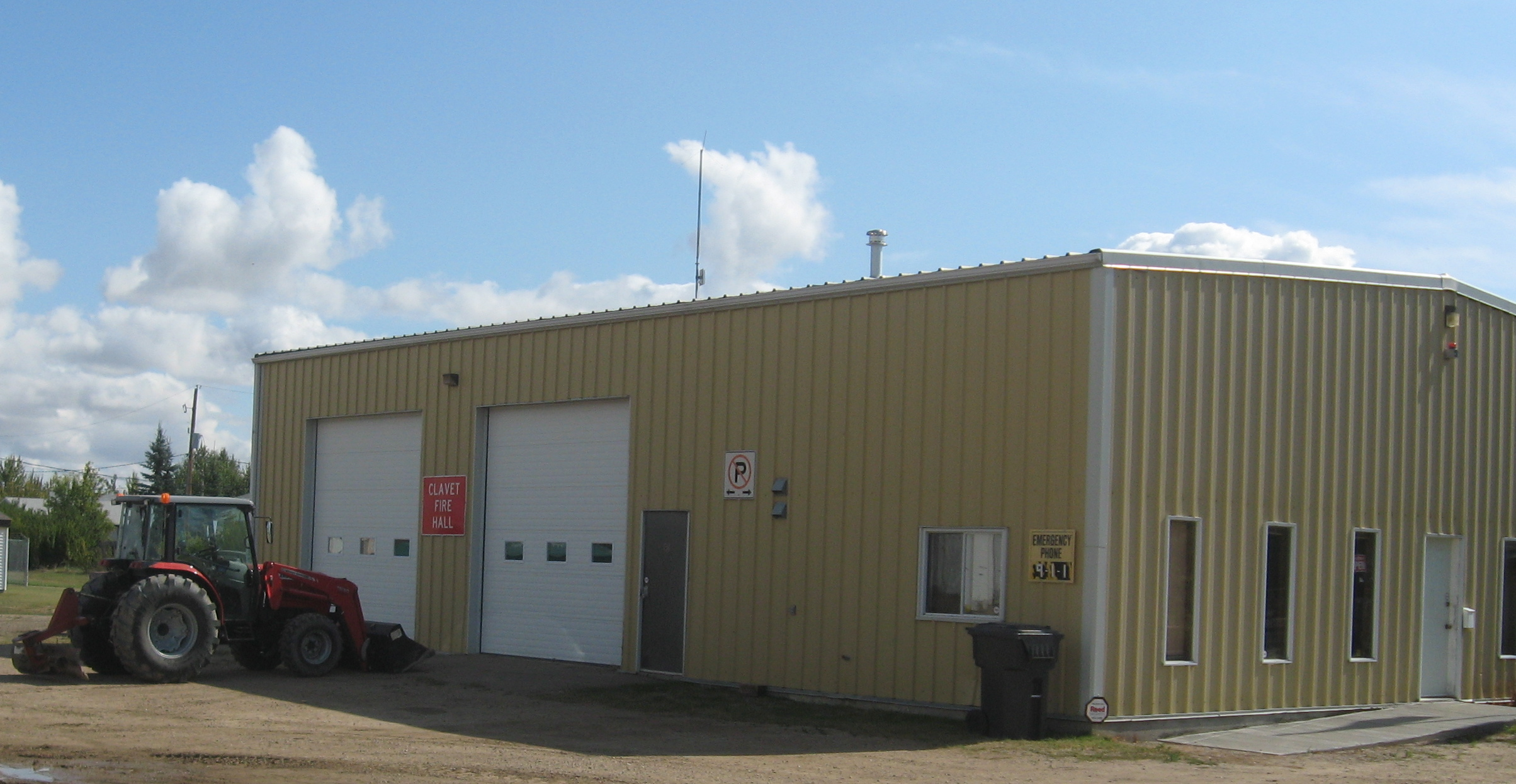
Fire station and village office

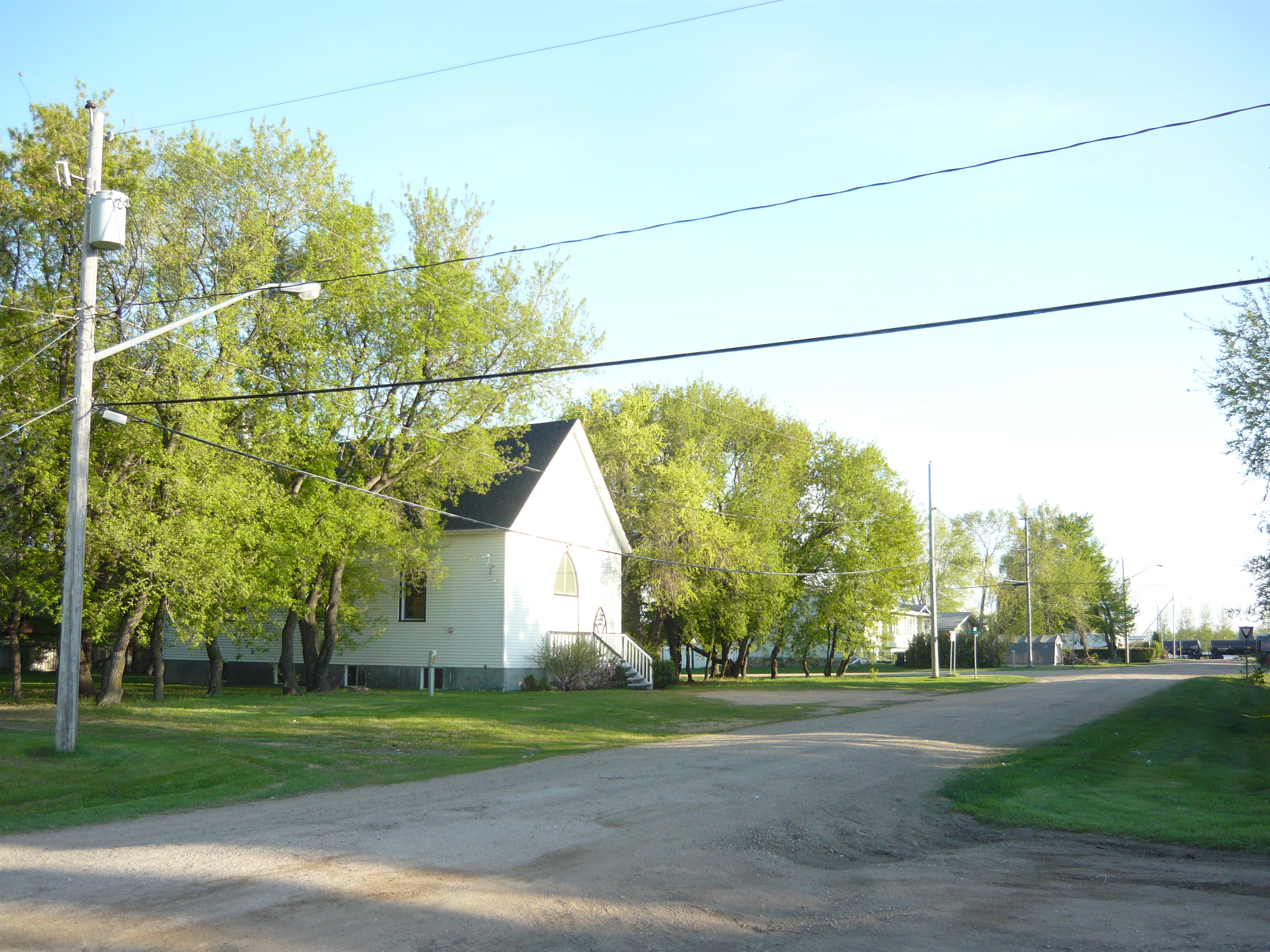
Queen Street

Clavet (/kləˈvɛt/ klə-VET) (2016 population: 410) is a village in the Canadian province of Saskatchewan within the Rural Municipality of Blucher No. 343 and Census Division No. 11. The village is located along an old section of the Yellowhead Highway, about 15 kilometres southeast of the city of Saskatoon.

== History ==
In 1908, the Village of French was established covering the south half of Section 16 and the southwest quarter of Section 15. J.T. Dawson was overseer and Alfred Rogers and C.H. Goodrich were councillors elected in February 1909. Carl H. Phillips was designated as secretary-treasurer.

On March 9, 1909, the name of French was changed to Clavet. The Village of Clavet did not experience successful civic affairs. In October 1909, W.C. Sutherland, Deputy Commissioner, recommended disorganization of the village because two council members had moved away, the secretary-treasurer had resigned, and the population was no longer sufficient to justify village status. However, despite years struggling with village affairs and severe chastising by Municipal Affairs, the Village of Clavet still existed in 1925 with a population of 9 men, 5 women, and 12 children. It also had two elevators, one general store, one implement shop, a lumberyard, a post office, a dwelling house, and a church. This gave an assessment of $27,850, a mill rate of 17, and a total tax revenue of $473.45.

On March 1, 1927, J.J. Smith, Deputy Minister of Municipal Affairs, disorganized the Village of Clavet due to too small a population and inadequate assessment to finance village affairs. Upon disorganization, the boundaries of Clavet had been altered. After, from 1927 to 1978, the affairs of Clavet were controlled and managed by the RM of Blucher No. 343. All the records and related information were kept at the RM's office, which burned down in 1982. Information about these years is, therefore, limited to what local residents can recall.

In 1964, Clavet became an organized hamlet of eleven families with a population of 39. The Hamlet of Clavet elected three board members who made recommendations to the RM of Blucher on the hamlet's behalf. The hamlet was surveyed following its organization, and water and sewer services were installed in 1972–1973 through the Family Farm Improvement Program at a cost of $14,689. There were 17 original connections to the system, plus the school. Ed Holobetz, the contractor, installed the original two-inch plastic lines to carry water from the Saskatchewan Water Supply Board System to all residents. Individual septic tanks served each house and the lagoon was situated near the present lift station. Saskatchewan Highways paved Main Street, Queen Street, and Second Avenue in 1972.

Two elevators which had been in operation during the early years burned down in 1967 and were not replaced. A third elevator was torn down and salvaged in 1968. The post office was operated by Jean Campbell out of her home at Queen Street and Second Avenue until her retirement in 1978. When I.E S. Confectioners opened in 1978, owned and operated by Irma Weisner and her daughter, Sandra Baumgartner, the post office was relocated in the store and operated by Sandra. Susan Yuzik became postmistress in 1981.

Following installation of water and sewer, new lots on Campbell Place, named in honour of Jean Campbell, were developed. The new homes constructed between 1975 and 1979 brought increased population, tax revenue, and strain on the present lagoon system. In early 1978, the residents of Clavet petitioned for village status. Clavet incorporated as a village on July 1, 1978. The first council consisted of Mayor Bill Martin and councillors Rudy Weisner and John Baumgartner. Ros Curnow was engaged as secretary-treasurer.

== Demographics ==
Population history (1981–2016)
Year	Pop.	±%
1981	234	—
1986	335	+43.2%
1991	359	+7.2%
1996	339	−5.6%
2001	357	+5.3%
2006	345	−3.4%
2011	386	+11.9%
2016	410	+6.2%
Source: Statistics Canada via Saskatchewan Bureau of Statistics

In the 2021 Census of Population conducted by Statistics Canada, Clavet had a population of 450 living in 147 of its 150 total private dwellings, a change of 9.8% from its 2016 population of 410. With a land area of 0.86 km^{2} (0.33 sq mi), it had a population density of 523.3/km^{2} (1,355.2/sq mi) in 2021.

In the 2016 Census of Population, the Village of Clavet recorded a population of 410 living in 137 of its 144 total private dwellings, a 5.9% change from its 2011 population of 386. With a land area of 0.84 km^{2} (0.32 sq mi), it had a population density of 488.1/km^{2} (1,264.2/sq mi) in 2016.

== Transportation ==
Clavet was formerly located on Yellowhead Highway 16, but in the 2000s a bypass was built to the north of the village and it is now said to be located on Old Highway 16, just south of where the main ighway joins with Highway 316. It is now accessible from 316.

The Saskatoon/Corman Air Park is located west of Clavet.

The Canadian National Railway passes through the village of Clavet.

== Education ==
Clavet Composite School offers schooling from Kindergarten to Grade 12.

== See also ==
- List of communities in Saskatchewan
- List of villages in Saskatchewan
