= Bradwell, Saskatchewan =

Village in Saskatchewan, Canada

Bradwell
- Village
- Village of Bradwell
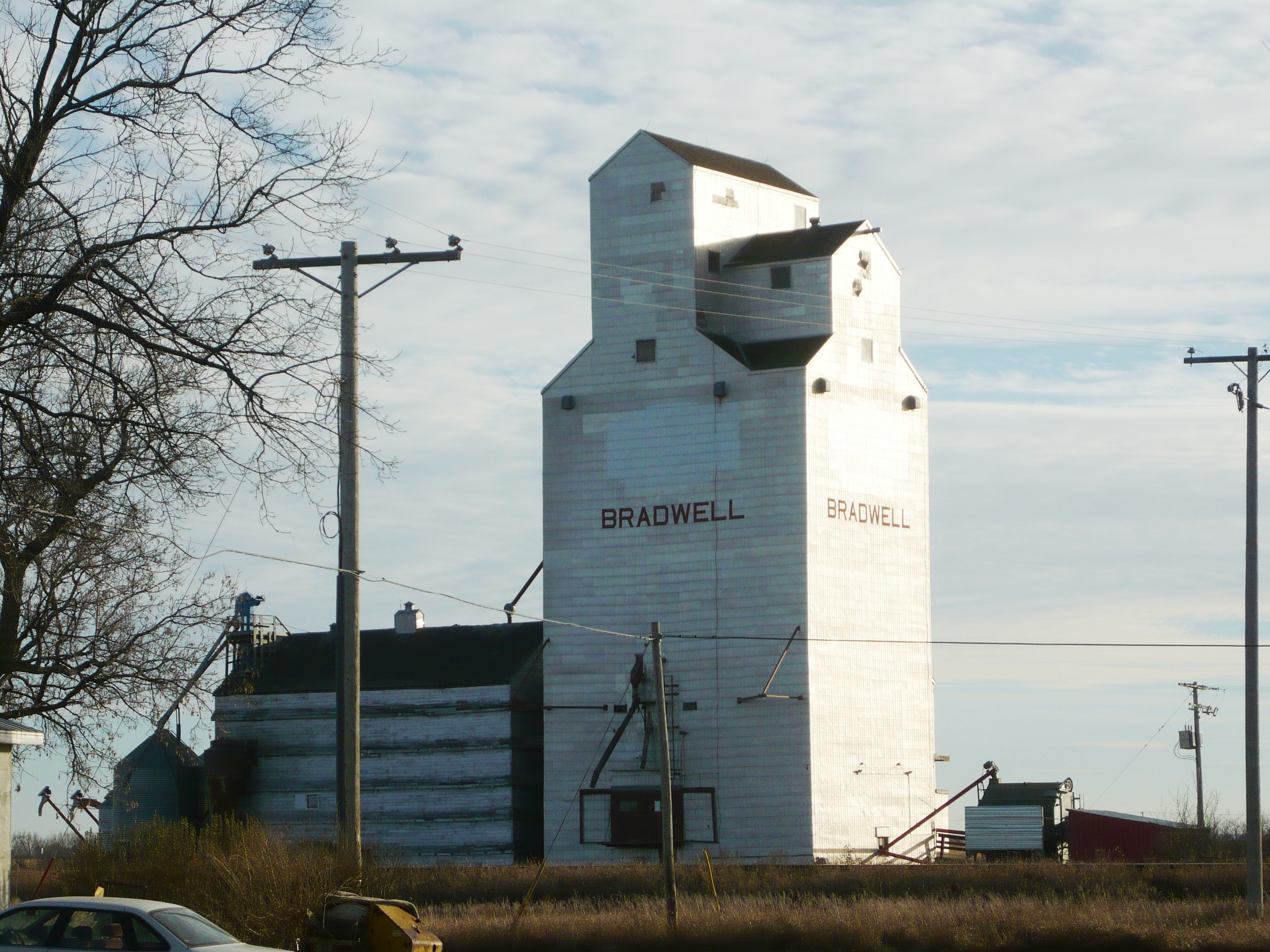
- Former Saskatchewan Wheat Pool Grain elevator in Bradwell

- Location of Bradwell in Saskatchewan Bradwell (Canada)
- Coordinates: 51.9475°N 106.2315°W
- Country: Canada
- Province: Saskatchewan
- Region: Central
- Census division: 15
- Rural Municipality: Blucher No. 343
- Post office founded: 1906 (as Sunny Plain)
- Post office closed: 1986
- Incorporated (Village): 1912

Government
  - Type: Municipal
  - Governing body: Bradwell Village Council
  - Mayor: Timothy Yanke
  - Administrator: Robert Thurmeier
  - MP, Moose Jaw—Lake Centre—Lanigan: Fraser Tolmie (2021)
  - MLA, Saskatoon Stonebridge-Dakota: Bronwyn Eyre (2020)

Area
  - Total: 0.42 km^{2} (0.16 sq mi)

Population (2021)
  - Total: 164
  - Density: 390.5/km^{2} (1,011/sq mi)
- Time zone: CST
- Postal code: S0K 0P0
- Area codes: 306, 639
- Highways: Highway 763
- Railways: Canadian National Railway

Bradwell (2021 population: 164) is a village in the Canadian province of Saskatchewan within the Rural Municipality of Blucher No. 343 and Census Division No. 11. The village is located about 36 kilometres (22 mi) southeast of the city of Saskatoon on Highway 763. In 1936, during gravel excavations for a highway, the partial skeleton of a Neolithic human male were discovered and named "Bradwell Man". A stone scraper and some eagle talons were found nearby.

== History ==
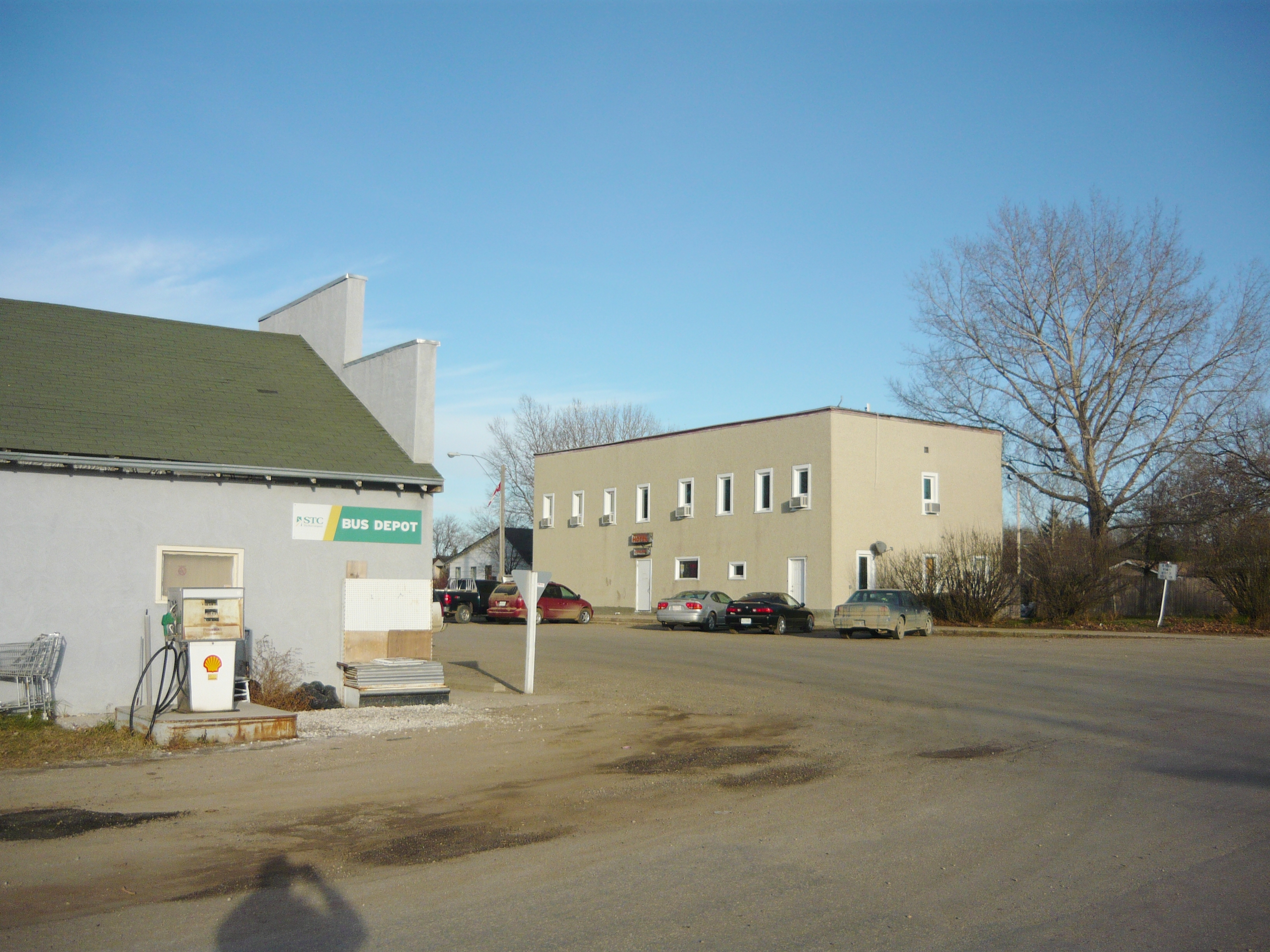
First Avenue and Struan Street, Bradwell

Bradwell incorporated as a village on December 26, 1912.

== Demographics ==
Population history (1981–2021)
Year	Pop.	±%
1981	168	—
1986	162	−3.6%
1991	148	−8.6%
1996	145	−2.0%
2001	156	+7.6%
2006	182	+16.7%
2011	230	+26.4%
2016	166	−27.8%
2021	164	−1.2%
Source: Statistics Canada via Saskatchewan Bureau of Statistics

In the 2021 Census of Population conducted by Statistics Canada, Bradwell had a population of 164 living in 70 of its 78 total private dwellings, a change of −1.2% from its 2016 population of 166. With a land area of 0.42 km^{2} (0.16 sq mi), it had a population density of 390.5/km^{2} (1,011.3/sq mi) in 2021.

In the 2016 Census of Population, the village of Bradwell recorded a population of 166 living in 62 of its 65 total private dwellings, a −38.6% change from its 2011 population of 230. With a land area of 0.42 km^{2} (0.16 sq mi), it had a population density of 395.2/km^{2} (1,023.7/sq mi) in 2016.

== See also ==
- List of communities in Saskatchewan
- List of villages in Saskatchewan
- Bradwell Reservoir
