= Cheviot Lake =

Lake in Saskatchewan, Canada

- Location in Saskatchewan Cheviot Lake (Canada)
- Location: RM of Blucher No. 343, Saskatchewan
- Coordinates: 52.0322°N 106.3198°W
- Part of: Saskatchewan River drainage basin
- Basin countries: Canada
- Surface area: 316.2 ha (781 acres)
- Shore length^{1}: 18 km (11 mi)
- Surface elevation: 512 m (1,680 ft)
- ^{1} Shore length is not a well-defined measure.

Cheviot Lake is a lake in the central part of the Canadian province of Saskatchewan, south-east of Saskatoon. The lake is located in the Rural Municipality of Blucher No. 343. It is a small lake predominantly surrounded by agricultural farm land.

== See also ==
- List of lakes of Saskatchewan
