= Mother liquor =

Chemical law term - deprecated

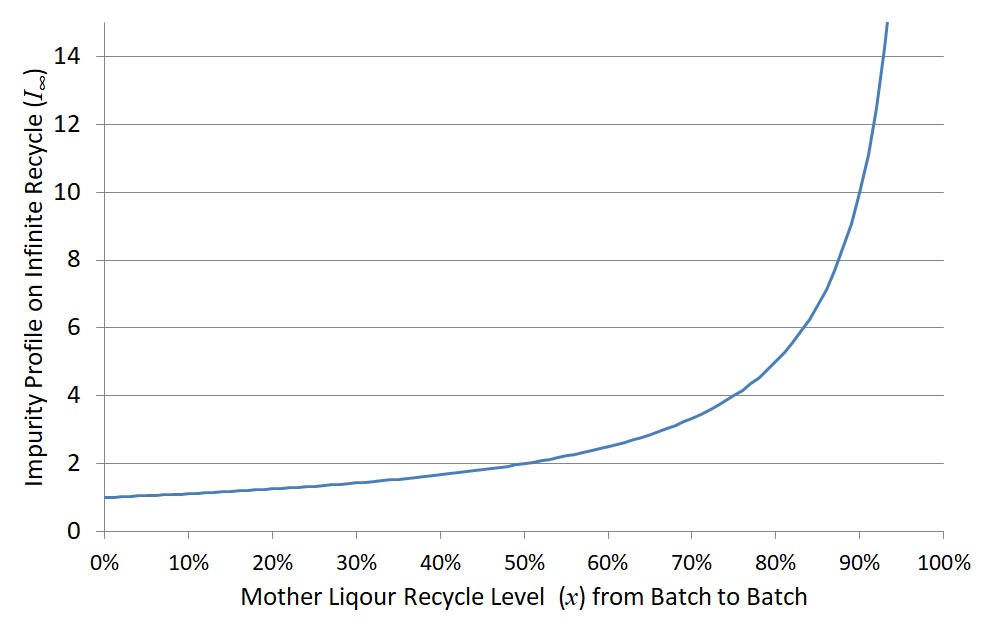
Figure 1: Calculate impurity profile after an infinite number of recycles as a function of the fraction of mother liquors reused

The mother liquor (or spent liquor) is the solution remaining after a component has been removed by a process such as filtration or more commonly crystallization. It is encountered in chemical processes including sugar refining.

In crystallization, a solid (usually impure) is dissolved in a solvent at high temperature, taking advantage of the fact that most solids are more soluble at higher temperatures. As the solution cools, the solubility of the solute in the solvent will gradually become smaller. The resultant solution is described as supersaturated, meaning that there is more solute dissolved in the solution than would be predicted by its solubility at that temperature. Crystallization can then be induced from this supersaturated solution and the resultant pure crystals removed by such methods as filtration and centrifugal separators. The remaining solution, once the crystals have been filtered out, is known as the mother liquor, and will contain a portion of the original solute (as predicted by its solubility at that temperature) as well as any impurities that were not filtered out. Second and third crops of crystals can then be harvested from the mother liquor.

An alternative to second cropping is continuous recycle of a portion of the mother liquors from one batch into in subsequent batches in which an increased product yield is expected, and also leads to an accumulation of impurities. It can be shown that the impurity profile of the mother liquors, at moderate recycle levels (i.e. when x>1), quickly reaches a steady state according to (1 − x^{n +1})/(1 − x), where n is the number of times the process is operated and x is the fraction of mother liquors recycled (Fig. 1). The aforementioned approach is idealised and assumes that the build up of impurities in the mother liquor does not exceed the impurity/impurities solubility. The approach has been confirmed experimentally.

== See also ==
- Precipitation (chemistry)
