= Elstow, Saskatchewan =

Community in Saskatchewan, Canada

Elstow
- Special service area
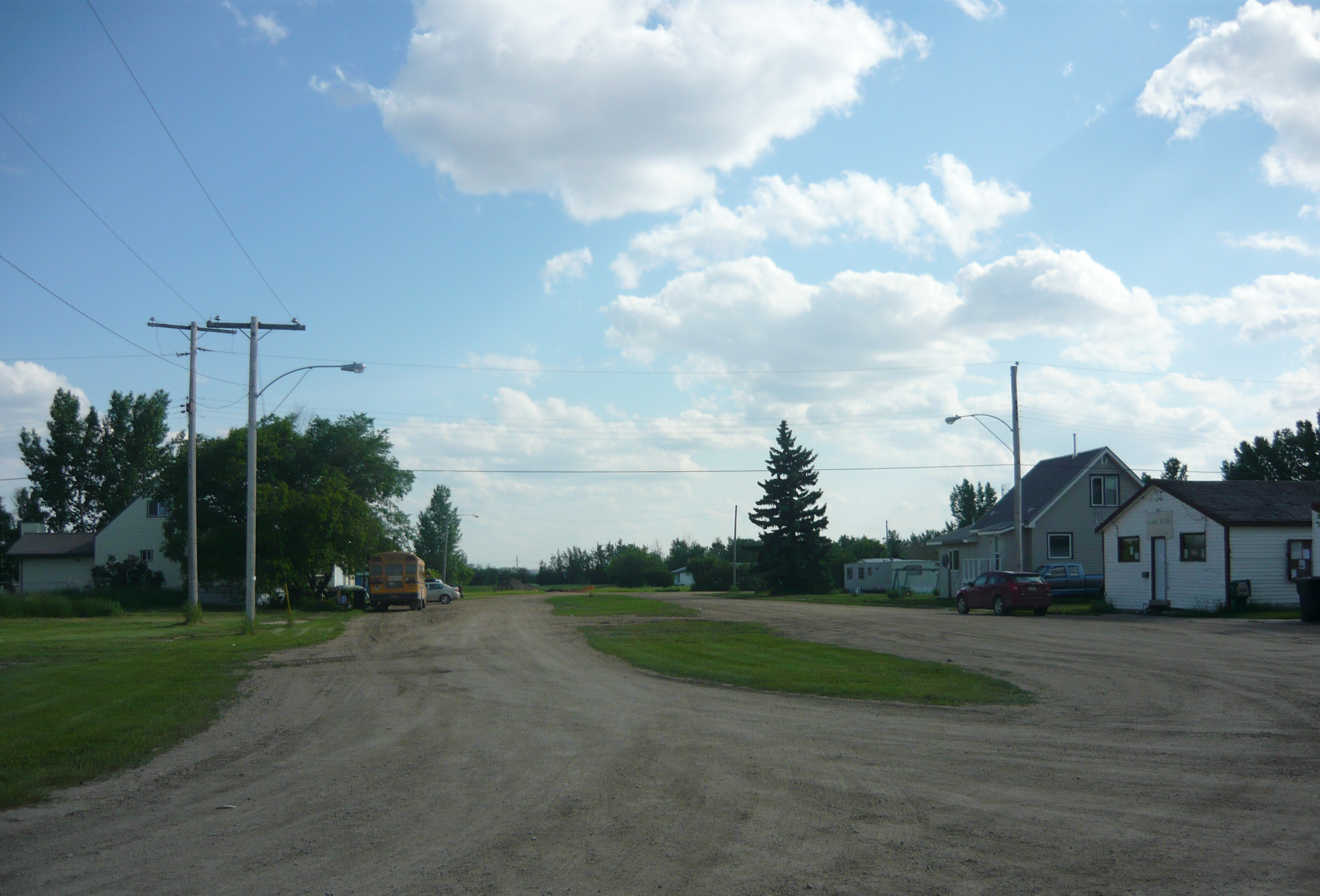
- Bedford Street

- Location of Elstow in Saskatchewan Elstow (Canada)
- Coordinates: 51.993°N 106.079°W
- Country: Canada
- Province: Saskatchewan
- Region: Saskatchewan
- Census division: 15
- Rural Municipality: Blucher No. 343
- Post office founded: December 15, 1907 (closed August 15, 1986)
- Village: December 17, 1908
- Dissolved: December 31, 2014

Area
  - Total: 0.58 km^{2} (0.22 sq mi)

Population (2006)
  - Total: 91
  - Density: 155.6/km^{2} (403/sq mi)
- Time zone: CST
- Postal code: S0K 1M0
- Area code: 306
- Highways: Highway 16

Elstow is a special service area within the Rural Municipality of Blucher No. 343 in Saskatchewan, Canada. It dissolved from village status on December 31, 2014. It was originally incorporated as a village on December 17, 1908.

== Demographics ==
Canada census – Elstow, Saskatchewan community profile

	2011
Population	89 (-2.2% from 2006)
Land area	0.63 km^{2} (0.24 sq mi)
Population density	142.4/km^{2} (369/sq mi)
Median age	43.8 (M: 45.0, F: 40.5)
Private dwellings	45 (total)
Median household income	$N/A

References: 2011

== See also ==
- List of communities in Saskatchewan
