= Patience Lake =

Lake in Saskatchewan, Canada

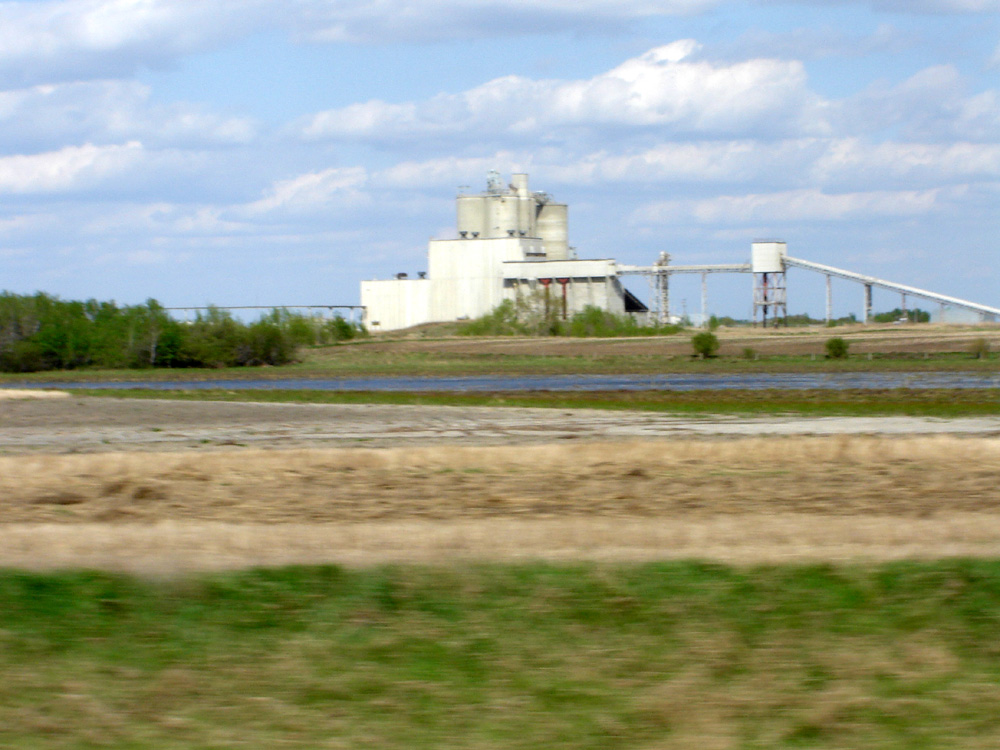
- Potash Corp. (now Nutrien) Mine at Patience Lake

- Location in Saskatchewan Patience Lake (Canada)
- Location: RM of Blucher No. 343, Saskatchewan
- Coordinates: 52°7′11″N 106°20′37″W
- Part of: Saskatchewan River drainage basin
- Basin countries: Canada
- Max. length: 6 km (3.7 mi)
- Max. width: 1 km (0.62 mi)
- Surface area: 6 km^{2} (2.3 sq mi)
- Settlements: None

Patience Lake is a lake in the central part of the Canadian province of Saskatchewan. The lake is east of Saskatoon in the Rural Municipality of Blucher No. 343. The lake serves as a groundwater discharge region for higher elevations to the east and west.

At the south end of the lake, Nutrien operates a solution mine that produces 331,000 tonnes of potash annually. A 50 ha (120-acre) region of the lake is sectioned off with an earth dyke to store brine tailings and saturated KCl solution. The potash mine was originally established as an underground mine, but due to flooding in 1988 it was converted to a solution mine.

== See also ==
- List of lakes of Saskatchewan
