= Rural Municipality of Blucher No. 343 =

Rural municipality in Saskatchewan, Canada

Blucher No. 343
- Rural municipality
- Rural Municipality of Blucher No. 343
- Location of the RM of Blucher No. 343 in Saskatchewan
- Coordinates: 52.012°N 106.168°W
- Country: Canada
- Province: Saskatchewan
- Census division: 11
- SARM division: 5
- Formed: December 13, 1909

Government
  - Reeve: Blair Cummins
  - Governing body: RM of Blucher No. 343 Council
  - Administrator: Pamela Lindberg
  - Office location: Bradwell

Area (2016)
  - Land: 789.64 km^{2} (304.88 sq mi)

Population (2016)
  - Total: 2,006
  - Density: 2.5/km^{2} (6.5/sq mi)
- Time zone: CST
  - Summer (DST): CST
- Area codes: 306 and 639

The Rural Municipality of Blucher No. 343 (2016 population: 2,006) is a rural municipality (RM) in the Canadian province of Saskatchewan within Census Division No. 11 and SARM Division No. 5. It is located in the north-central portion of the province on the South Saskatchewan River.

== History ==
The RM of Blucher No. 343 incorporated as a rural municipality on December 13, 1909. In 1958, the Patience Lake Mine was the first potash mine built in Canada.

== Geography ==
Numerous water bodies are located in the RM of Blucher No. 343. The larger lakes include Cheviot Lake, Bradwell Reservoir, Crawford Lake, Judith Lake, and Patience Lake.

=== Communities and localities ===
The following urban municipalities are surrounded by the RM.

Towns

- Allan

Villages

- Bradwell
- Clavet

The following unincorporated communities are located within the RM.

Special service areas

- Elstow (dissolved as a village, December 31, 2014)

Unincorporated hamlets

- Blucher
- Cheviot

== Demographics ==
Population history (1981–2016)
Year	Pop.	±%
1981	1,287	—
1986	1,383	+7.5%
1991	1,225	−11.4%
1996	1,155	−5.7%
2001	1,476	+27.8%
2006	1,593	+7.9%
2011	1,787	+12.2%
2016	2,006	+12.3%
Source: Statistics Canada via Saskatchewan Bureau of Statistics

In the 2021 Census of Population conducted by Statistics Canada, the RM of Blucher No. 343 had a population of 1,984 living in 748 of its 795 total private dwellings, a change of −1.1% from its 2016 population of 2,006. With a land area of 789.4 km^{2} (304.8 sq mi), it had a population density of 2.5/km^{2} (6.5/sq mi) in 2021.

In the 2016 Census of Population, the RM of Blucher No. 343 recorded a population of 2,006 living in 766 of its 808 total private dwellings, a 6.9% change from its 2011 population of 1,876. With a land area of 789.64 km^{2} (304.88 sq mi), it had a population density of 2.5/km^{2} (6.6/sq mi) in 2016.

== Government ==
The RM of Blucher No. 343 is governed by an elected municipal council and an appointed administrator that meets on the second Wednesday of every month. The reeve of the RM is Blair Cummins while its administrator is Pamela Lindberg. The RM's office is located in Bradwell.

== Attractions ==
- Christ Church — West Patience Lake (municipal heritage property)

== Bradwell National Wildlife Area (NWA) ==
Bradwell National Wildlife Area (51.9084°N 106.2506°W) is a 123-hectare (300-acre) protected area established in 1968. It is in the RM of Blucher, about 48 kilometres (30 mi) south-east of Saskatoon. With the completion of the Gardiner Dam and Lake Diefenbaker in 1967, wetland habitat in the area was lost. Ducks Unlimited Canada was involved in a project with Canadian Wildlife Service to bring water to the marshes in the area to ensure stable water levels year-round. The water for Bradwell NWA comes via aqueduct from Lake Diefenbaker, which is about 100 kilometres (62 mi) to the south-west, and controlled by a series of dykes, ditches, and water control structures. Directly upstream in the aqueduct system is Blackstrap Lake and downstream is Bradwell Reservoir.

Bradwell NWA is in the Moist Mixed Grassland ecoregion. The landscape has groves of trembling aspen and idled hayfields. A total of five wetlands are protected within the NWA and birds found there include the bobolink, horned grebe, redhead, canvasback, northern pintail, ruddy duck, lesser snow goose, white-fronted goose, marbled godwit, and the Wilson's phalarope.

== See also ==
- List of rural municipalities in Saskatchewan
