= Nutrien =

Canadian fertilizer company

Coordinates: 52.123623°N 106.665569°W

Nutrien Ltd.

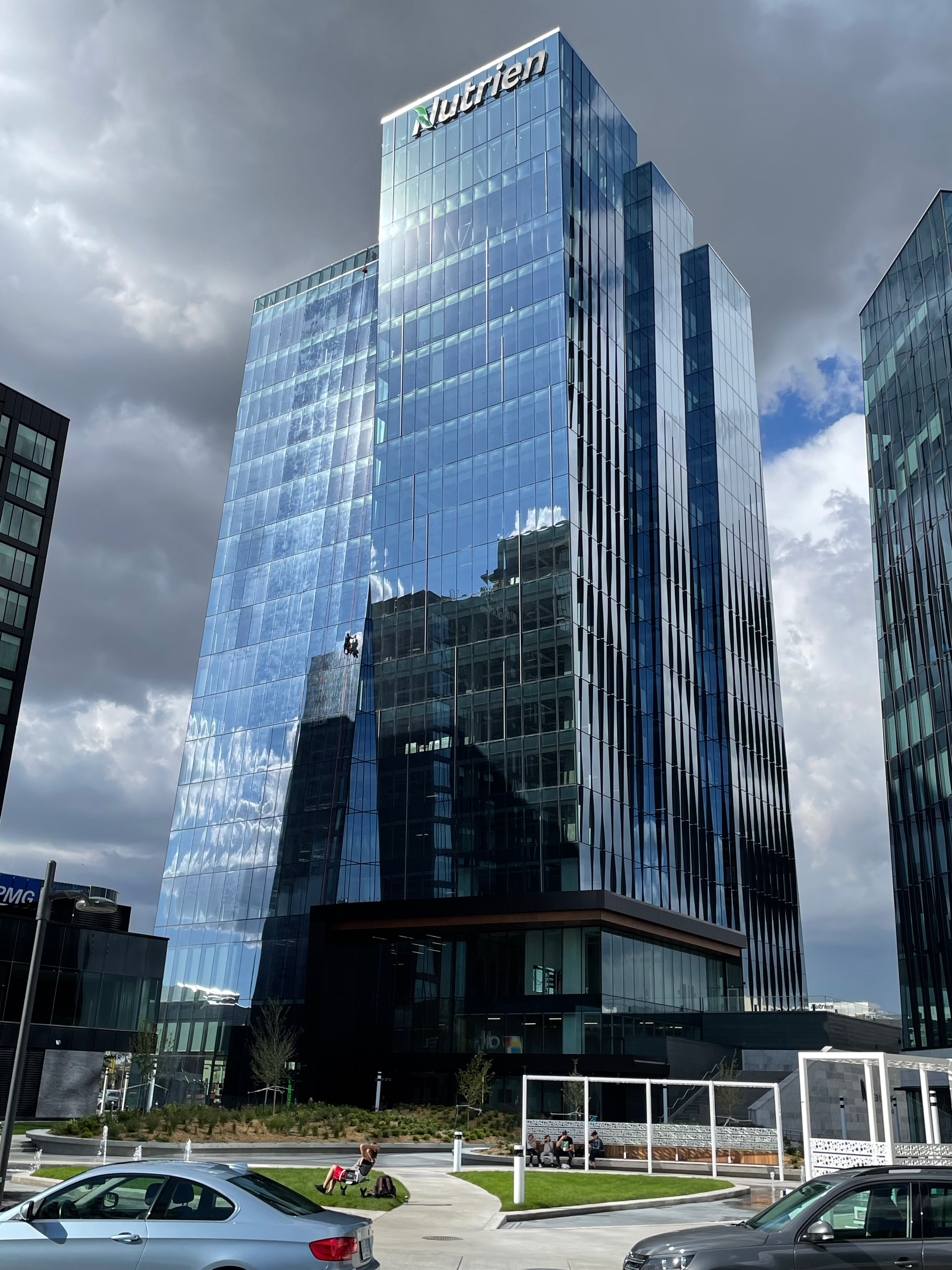
- Nutrien head office in Saskatoon
- Type: Public company
- Traded as: TSX: NTR; NYSE: NTR; S&P/TSX 60 Component
- Industry: Agriculture
- Predecessors: PotashCorp, Agrium
- Founded: 2018
- Headquarters: Saskatoon, Saskatchewan, Canada
- Number of locations: 1200 stores (2018)
- Area served: Worldwide
- Key people: Ken Seitz (President & CEO), and Russ Girling (Executive Chair)
- Revenue: ▼US$29.056 billion (2023)
- Operating income: ▼US$2.745 billion (2023)
- Net income: ▼US$1.282 billion (2023)
- Total assets: ▼US$52.749 billion (2023)
- Total equity: ▼US$25.201 billion (2023)
- Number of employees: 23,400
- Subsidiaries: Agrium, PotashCorp (PCS), Agrichem do Brasil S.A., Agrible, Inc., Actagro, Grupo TEC AGRO,
- Website: www.nutrien.com

Nutrien is a Canadian fertilizer company based in Saskatoon, Saskatchewan. It is the largest producer of potash, second largest producer of nitrogen fertilizer in the world and generally the 2nd largest in fertilizers worldwide. It has over 2,000 retail locations across North America, South America, and Australia with more than 23,500 employees. It is listed on the Toronto Stock Exchange (symbol NTR) and New York Stock Exchange (symbol NTR), with a market capitalization of $34 billion as of January 2018. It was formed through the merger of PotashCorp and Agrium, in a transaction that closed on January 1, 2018.

== History ==
=== Merger ===
PotashCorp and Agrium first proposed merging in September 2016. The merger was suggested in the context of low fertilizer prices, leading to the hope that a larger company will be better able to increase prices. The new company also hopes to reduce costs through consolidation; it estimates that it will be able to decrease costs by US$500 million.

The transaction was originally expected to close in mid-2017, but was delayed to January 2018 because of regulatory hurdles; final regulatory approval from the United States Federal Trade Commission (FTC) was only received in December 2017. Based on the terms of the merger, former PotashCorp shareholders were given 52% of Nutrien, while Agrium shareholders were given 48%. Agrium CEO Charles Magro became CEO of the new company, while PotashCorp CEO Jochen Tilk became Executive Chair. Nutrien is based in Saskatoon, the former headquarters of PotashCorp, but it will maintain corporate offices in Calgary, the former headquarters of Agrium.

In May 2018, Nutrien announced it would sell to Tianqi Lithium a 24% stake in the Chilean mining company Sociedad Química y Minera (SQM) for approximately US$4.1 billion. Tianqi was to purchase 62.5 million SQM A shares for US$65 each. Nutrien needed to satisfy the Chinese and Indian regulators because of concerns it would corner the potash market. The sale closed on 5 December 2018.

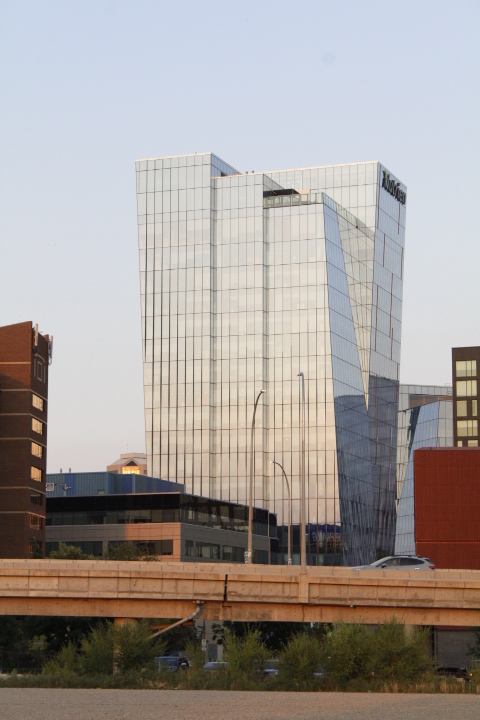

In February 2019, Nutrien, through its Australian subsidiary Landmark Operations announced the proposed acquisition of Australian rural retail organization RuralCo. The acquisition was finalized on October 1, 2019, after which Ruralco was delisted from the ASX. After this acquisition, Nutrien now supplies 650 rural merchandise stores in Australia, or approximately 45% of all rural merchandise stores in Australia.

In July 2022, Nutrien announced that it would acquire Brazilian retail fertilizer company Casa do Adubo, increasing its expansion in Latin America.

== Competition ==
Nutrien's main competitors include other potash, phosphate and nitrogen producers, such as The Mosaic Company, Yara International ASA, CF Industries Holdings Inc and K+S AG.
