= Potash =

Salt mixture

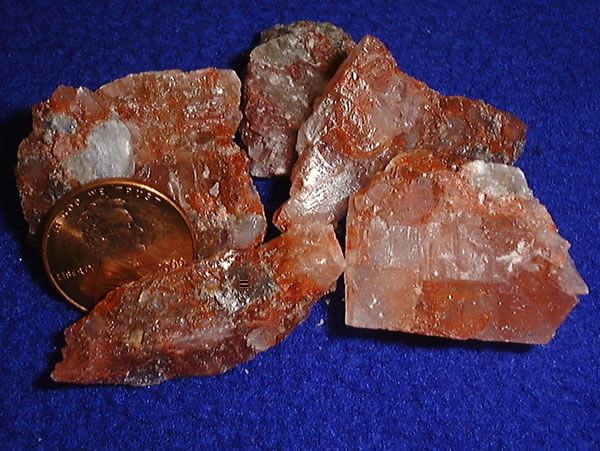
Polycrystalline potash, with a U.S. penny for reference. (The coin is 19 mm (0.75 in) in diameter and copper in color.)

Potash (/ˈpɒtæʃ/ POT-ash) is a name for mined and manufactured salts that contain potassium in water-soluble form.

The term potash derives from pot ash, either plant ashes or wood ashes that were soaked in water in a pot, which was the primary means of manufacturing potash before the Industrial Era. The majority of production during this period was in forested areas like Europe, Russia and North America. Some potash is derived from mines into evaporite deposits – deposits of salts from ancient seas that are deposited in sedimentary layers.

In 2021, the worldwide production of potash exceeded 71.9 million tonnes (~45.4 million tonnes K_{2}O equivalent) (Note: Chemically pure KCl (96% of world potash capacity) contains 63.17% K_{2}O equivalent)), and Canada is the largest producer of potash, the majority of which is used as fertilizer; other major producers include Russia and Belarus. As the third most important nutrient for agricultural plants, control of production can lead to risks, such as market manipulation and disruptions by geopolitics.

== Terminology ==
The old method of making potassium carbonate (K_{2}CO_{3}) was either by collecting or by producing wood ash (the occupation of the ash burner), chemically leaching the ashes and then evaporating the resulting solution in large iron pots, which yielded a white residue called "pot ash"; approximately 10% by weight of common wood ash can be recovered as potash.

The word potassium derives from potash. Potassium was first derived by Humphry Davy in 1807 by electrolysis of caustic potash (potassium hydroxide).

Historically, potash was a common name for potassium oxide (known as KO prior to the correct formula, K_{2}O, being solved) in the factitious airs era. Laviosier had named CO_{2} as carbonic acid (unrelated to H_{2}CO_{3}), and Laviosier also defined carbonates as a salt of carbonic acid with a base. Wollaston later defined bicarbonate of potash to be a salt with two CO_{2} 'carbonic acids' affixed to the base. Therefore, carbonate of potash was historically expressed as (KO,CO_{2}) and bicarbonate of potash was expressed as (KO,2CO_{2}). This outdated chemical logic, nomenclature and formula predated modern molecular understanding of the carbonate structure. See factitious airs for further information.

The term potash later identified minerals that contained potassium salts and the artificial commercial product derived from the salts. The table identifies eight (8) potassium compounds with the term potash in their traditional names:

Common name	Chemical name (Formula)
Potash fertilizer	To the early 20th century: potassium carbonate (K_{2}CO_{3}); from the late-19th century: one or more compounds of potassium chloride (KCl), potassium sulfate (K_{2}SO_{4}), or potassium nitrate (KNO_{3}). Does not contain potassium oxide (K_{2}O), which plants do not take up; the amount of potassium is reported as K_{2}O equivalent (i.e. if in K_{2}O form), however, to allow direct comparison between different fertilizers using different types of potash.
Caustic potash or potash lye	potassium hydroxide (KOH)
Carbonate of potash, salts of tartar, or pearl ash	potassium carbonate (K_{2}CO_{3})
Bicarbonate of potash	potassium bicarbonate (KHCO_{3})
Chlorate of potash	potassium chlorate (KClO_{3})
Muriate of potash (MOP)	potassium chloride (KCl:NaCl = 95:5 or higher)
Nitrate of potash or saltpeter	potassium nitrate (KNO_{3})
Sulfate of potash (SOP)	potassium sulfate (K_{2}SO_{4})
Permanganate of potash	potassium permanganate (KMnO_{4})

== History ==
The very first U.S. patent ever to be issued was for an improvement "in the making of Pot ash and Pearl ash by a new Apparatus and Process"; it was signed by then President George Washington.

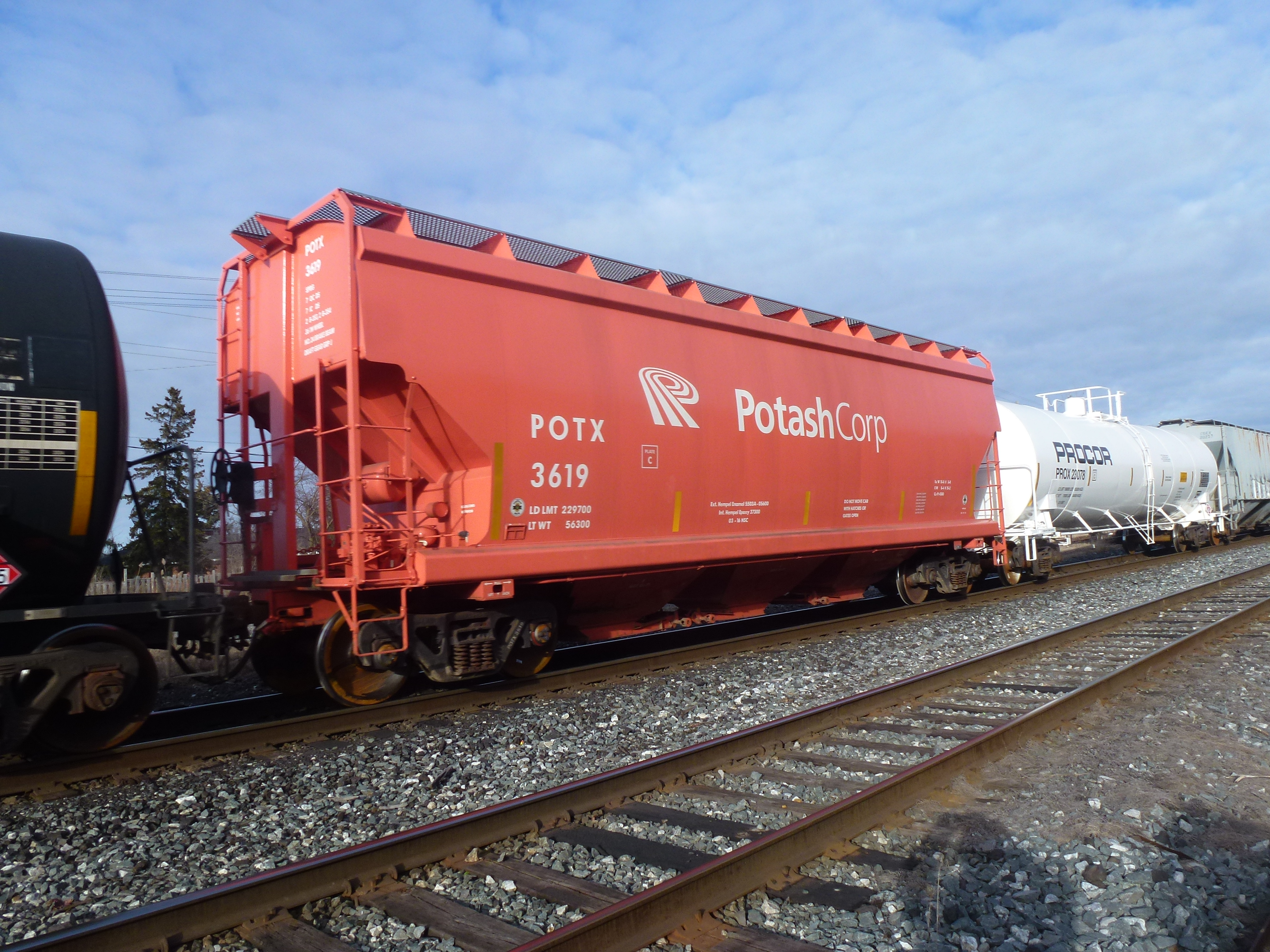
A covered hopper car in a Canadian train for shipping potash by rail

=== Origin of potash ore ===
Most of the world reserves of potassium (K) were deposited as sea water in ancient inland oceans. After the water evaporated, the potassium salts crystallized into beds of potash ore. These are the locations where potash is being mined today. The deposits are a naturally occurring mixture of potassium chloride (KCl; mineral name sylvite) and sodium chloride (NaCl; mineral name halite), more commonly known as table salt. Over time, as the surface of the earth changed, these deposits were covered by thousands of feet of earth.

=== Bronze Age ===
Potash (especially potassium carbonate) has been used in bleaching textiles, making glass, ceramic, and making soap, since the Bronze Age. Potash was principally obtained by leaching the ashes of wood burned for heating and cooking.

=== 14th–17th century ===
==== Potash mining ====
Beginning in the 14th century potash was mined in Ethiopia. One of the world's largest deposits, 140 to 150 million tons, is located in the Dallol area of the Afar Region.

==== Wood-derived potash ====
Potash was one of the most important industrial chemicals. It was refined from the ashes of broadleaved trees and produced primarily in the forested areas of Europe, Russia, and North America. Although methods for producing artificial alkalis were invented in the late 18th century, these did not become economical until the late 19th century and so the dependence on organic sources of potash remained.

Potash became an important international trade commodity in Europe from at least the early 14th century. It is estimated that European imports of potash required 6 or more million cubic metres each year from the early 17th century. Between 1420 and 1620, the primary exporting cities for wood-derived potash were Gdańsk, Königsberg and Riga. In the late 15th century, London was the lead importer due to its position as the centre of soft soap making while the Dutch dominated as suppliers and consumers in the 16th century. From the 1640s, geopolitical disruptions (i.e. Russo-Polish War (1654–1667)) meant that the centres of export moved from the Baltic to Arkhangelsk, Russia. In 1700, Russian ash was dominant though Gdańsk remained notable for the quality of its potash.

=== 18th century ===
==== Kelp ash ====
On the Orkney islands, kelp ash provided potash and soda ash, production starting "possibly as early as 1719" and lasting for a century. The products were "eagerly sought after by the glass and soap industries of the time."

==== North America ====
By the 18th century, higher quality American potash was increasingly exported to Britain. In the late 18th and early 19th centuries, potash production provided settlers in North America badly needed cash and credit as they cleared wooded land for crops. To make full use of their land, settlers needed to dispose of excess wood. The easiest way to accomplish this was to burn any wood not needed for fuel or construction. Ashes from hardwood trees could then be used to make lye, which could either be used to make soap or boiled down to produce valuable potash. Hardwood could generate ashes at the rate of 60 to 100 bushels per acre (500 to 900 m^{3}/km^{2}). In 1790, the sale of ashes could generate $3.25 to $6.25 per acre ($800 to $1,500/km^{2}) in rural New York State – nearly the same rate as hiring a laborer to clear the same area. Potash making became a major industry in British North America. Great Britain was always the most important market. The American potash industry followed the woodsman's ax across the country.

==== The first US patent ====
The first US patent of any kind was issued in 1790 to Samuel Hopkins for an improvement "in the making of Pot ash and Pearl ash by a new Apparatus and Process". Pearl ash was a purer quality product made by calcination of potash in a reverberatory furnace or kiln. Pearl ash was used in glassmaking, to make saltpeter for gunpowder, and as a leavening agent in baking (as baking powder and baking soda were not invented until the 1840s).

=== 19th century ===
After about 1820, New York replaced New England as the most important source; by 1840 the center was in Ohio. Potash production was always a by-product industry, following from the need to clear land for agriculture.

==== Canada ====
From 1767, potash from wood ashes was exported from Canada. By 1811, 70% of the total 19.6 million lbs of potash imports to Britain came from Canada. Exports of potash and pearl ash reached 43,958 barrels in 1865. There were 519 asheries in operation in 1871.

=== 20th century industrialization ===
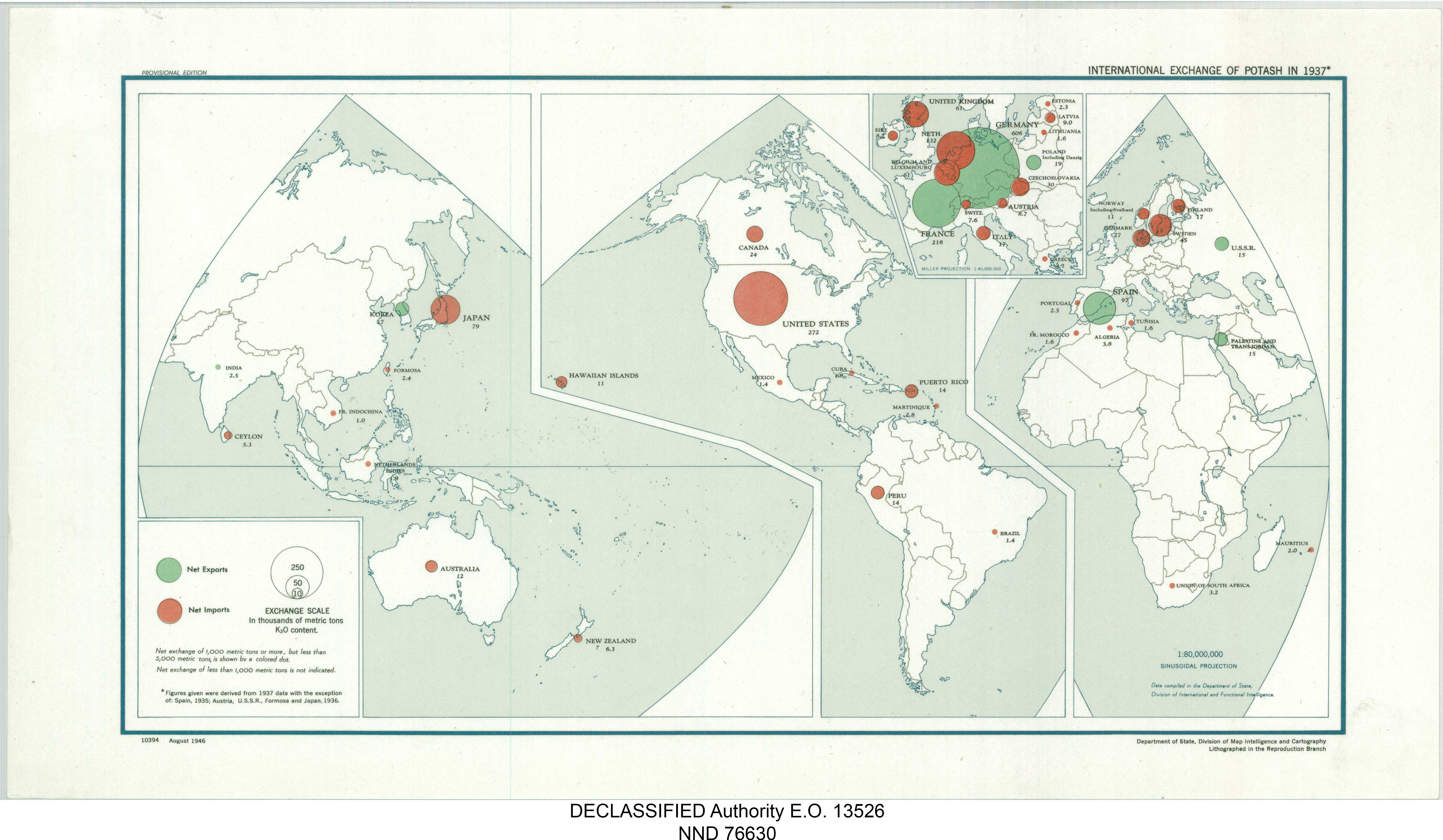
Global imports/exports of potash in 1937

The wood-ash industry declined in the late 19th century when large-scale production of potash from mineral salts was established in Germany. In the early 20th century, the potash industry was dominated by a cartel in which Germany had the dominant role. WWI saw a brief resurgence of American asheries, with their product typically consisting of 66% hydroxide, 17% carbonate, 16% sulfate and other impurities. Later in the century, the cartel ended as new potash producers emerged in the USSR and Canada.

In 1943, potash was discovered in Saskatchewan, Canada, during oil drilling. Active exploration began in 1951. In 1958, the Potash Company of America became the first potash producer in Canada with the commissioning of an underground potash mine at Patience Lake. As numerous potash producers in Canada developed, the Saskatchewan government became increasingly involved in the industry, leading to the creation of Canpotex in the 1970s.

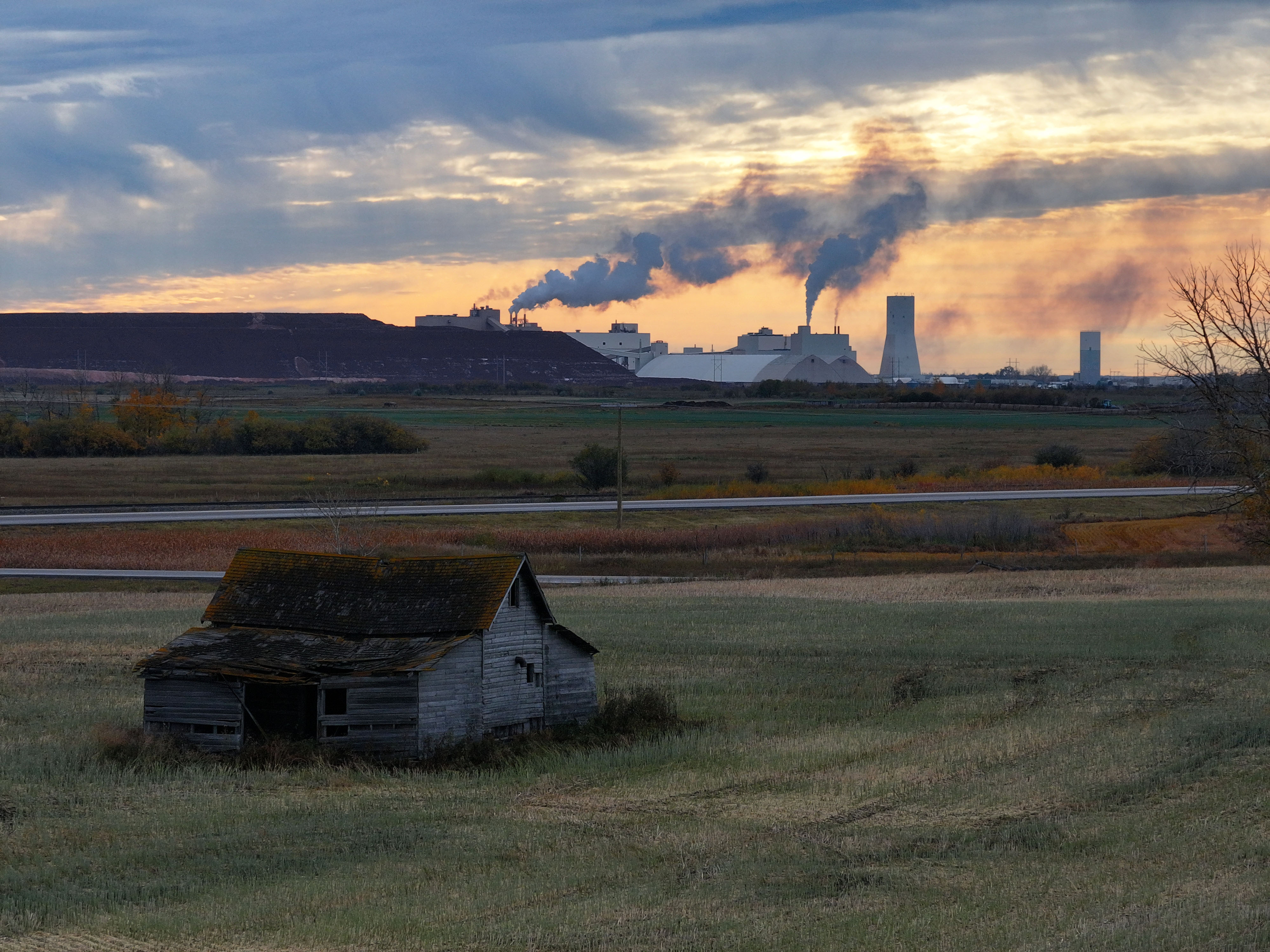
The Nutrien potash mine in Lanigan, Saskatchewan is one of the world’s largest underground potash operations

In 1964 the Canadian company Kalium Chemicals established the first potash mine using the solution process. The discovery was made during oil reserve exploration. The mine was developed near Regina, Saskatchewan. The mine reached depths greater than 1500 meters. It is now the Mosaic Corporation's Belle Plaine unit.

The USSR's potash production had largely been for domestic use and use in the Council for Mutual Economic Assistance countries. After the dissolution of the USSR, Russian and Belarusian potash producers entered into direct competition with producers elsewhere in the world for the first time.

In the beginning of the 20th century, potash deposits were found in the Dallol Depression in the Musely and Crescent localities near the Ethiopean-Eritrean border. The estimated reserves in Musely and Crescent are 173 and 12 million tonnes respectively. The latter is particularly suitable for surface mining. It was explored in the 1960s but the works stopped due to flooding in 1967. Attempts to continue mining in the 1990s were halted by the Eritrean–Ethiopian War and have not resumed as of 2009.

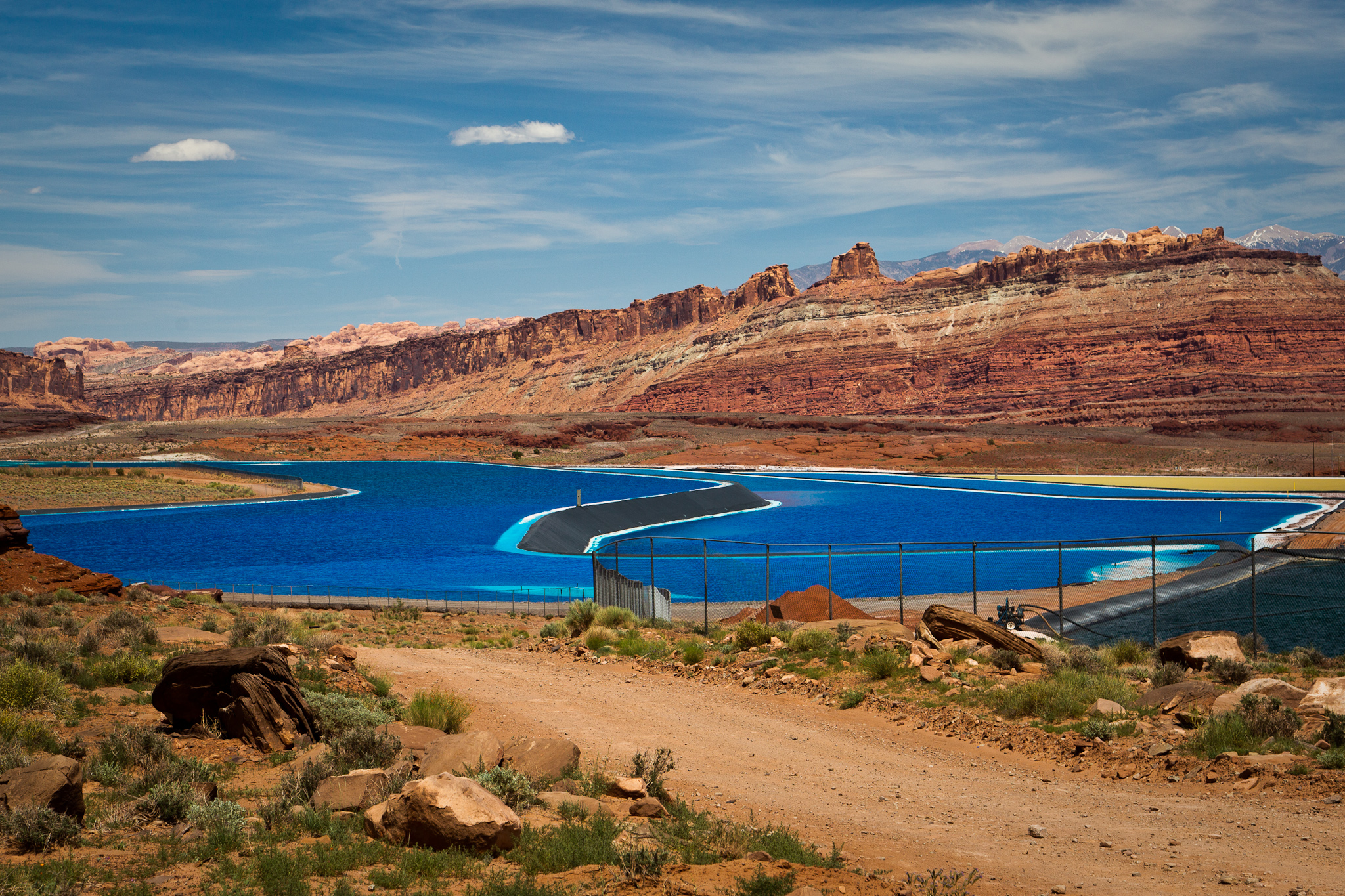
Potash evaporation ponds at the Intrepid Potash mine near Moab, Utah

== Mining ==
=== Shaft mining and strip mining ===
All commercial potash deposits come originally from evaporite deposits and are often buried deep below the earth's surface. Potash ores are typically rich in potassium chloride (KCl), sodium chloride (NaCl) and other salts and clays, and are typically obtained by conventional shaft mining with the extracted ore ground into a powder. Most potash mines today are deep shaft mines as much as 4,400 feet (1,400 m) underground. Others are mined as strip mines, having been laid down in horizontal layers as sedimentary rock. In above-ground processing plants, the KCl is separated from the mixture to produce a high-analysis potassium fertilizer. Other potassium salts can be separated by various procedures, resulting in potassium sulfate and potassium-magnesium sulfate. Saskatchewan is the world’s largest producer of potash.

=== Dissolution mining and evaporation methods ===
Other methods include dissolution mining and evaporation methods from brines. In the evaporation method, hot water is injected into the potash, which is dissolved and then pumped to the surface where it is concentrated by solar induced evaporation. Amine reagents are then added to either the mined or evaporated solutions. The amine coats the KCl but not NaCl. Air bubbles cling to the amine + KCl and float it to the surface while the NaCl and clay sink to the bottom. The surface is skimmed for the amine + KCl, which is then dried and packaged for use as a K rich fertilizer—KCl dissolves readily in water and is available quickly for plant nutrition.

Recovery of potassium fertilizer salts from sea water has been studied in India. During extraction of salt from seawater by evaporation, potassium salts get concentrated in bittern, an effluent from the salt industry.

== Production ==
Potash production

Potash deposits are distributed unevenly throughout the world. As of 2015, deposits are being mined in Canada, Russia, China, Belarus, Israel, Germany, Chile, the United States, Jordan, Spain, the United Kingdom, Uzbekistan and Brazil, with the most significant deposits present under the great depths of the Prairie Evaporite Formation in Saskatchewan, Canada. Canada and Russia are the countries where the bulk of potash is produced; Belarus is also a major producer. The oligopolistic structure of potash production as of 2025 contributes to higher potash prices and market manipulation.

The Permian Basin deposit includes the major mines outside of Carlsbad, New Mexico, to the world's purest potash deposit in Lea County, New Mexico (near the Carlsbad deposits), which is believed to be roughly 80% pure. (Osceola County, Michigan, has deposits 90+% pure; the only mine there was converted to salt production, however.) Canada is the largest producer, followed by Russia and Belarus. The most significant reserve of Canada's potash is located in the province of Saskatchewan and is mined by The Mosaic Company, Nutrien and K+S.

In China, most potash deposits are concentrated in the deserts and salt flats of the endorheic basins of its western provinces, particularly Qinghai. Geological expeditions discovered the reserves in the 1950s but commercial exploitation lagged until Deng Xiaoping's Reform and Opening Up Policy in the 1980s. The 1989 opening of the Qinghai Potash Fertilizer Factory in the remote Qarhan Playa increased China's production of potassium chloride sixfold, from less than 40,000 t (39,000 long tons; 44,000 short tons) a year at Haixi and Tanggu to just under 240,000 t (240,000 long tons; 260,000 short tons) a year.

In 2013, almost 70% of potash production was controlled by Canpotex, an exporting and marketing firm, and the Belarusian Potash Company. The latter was a joint venture between Belaruskali and Uralkali, but on July 30, 2013, Uralkali announced that it had ended the venture.

Potash is water soluble and transporting it requires special transportation infrastructure.

List of countries by potash production
Rank	Country	Extraction in thousand metric tons K_{2}O equivalent				
Rank	Country	2020	2021	2022	2023	2024
1	Canada	13,772	14,276	14,393	14,043	14,394
2	Russia	8,114	9,101	5,930	7,930	10,000
3	China	5,570	5,190	5,890	6,320	6,300
4	Belarus	7,562	8,000	3,694	6,609	5,000
5	Germany	2,874	2,793	2,709	2,356	2,500
6	Laos	432	495	898	2,001	2,400
7	Israel	2,416	2,379	2,447	2,330	2,257
8	Jordan	1,598	1,563	1,637	1,696	1,732
9	Chile	934	861	654	719	564
10	Spain	352	376	415	367	489
11	United States	460	480	430	390	410
12	Brazil	255	213	300	363	331
13	Uzbekistan	214	242	257	202	200
14	United Kingdom	99	110	133	141	101
15	Bolivia	24	27	30	75	50
16	Turkmenistan	20	20	0	0	0
	Total	44,700	46,100	39,800	45,500	46,700

== Occupational hazards ==
Excessive respiratory disease due to environmental hazards, such as radon and asbestos, has been a concern for potash miners throughout history. Potash miners are liable to develop silicosis. Based on a study conducted between 1977 and 1987 of cardiovascular disease among potash workers, the overall mortality rates were low, but a noticeable difference in above-ground workers was documented.

== Use ==
Production of potash and reserves at some current mines (being <2% of global reserves) (both in $\ce{K2O}$ equivalent) (2021, in million tonnes)
Country	Production	Reserves
Canada	14.2 (28.57%)	1,100 (33.33%)
Russia	9.1 (17.14%)	400 (12.12%)
Belarus	7.6 (16.48%)	750 (22.73%)
China	6.0 (14.76%)	170 (5.15%)
Germany	2.8 (6.90%)	150 (4.55%)
Israel	2.4 (5.14%)	Large (?%)
Jordan	1.6 (3.37%)	Large (?%)
Chile	0.9 (1.85%)	100 (3.03%)
United States	0.5 (1.04%)	220 (6.67%)
Spain	0.4 (0.79%)	68 (2.06%)
Brazil	0.3 (0.58%)	2.3 (0.01%)
Other countries	0.4 (0.76%)	300 (9.09%)
World total	46.3 (100.00%)	>3,300 (100.00%)

=== Fertilizers ===
Potassium is the third major plant and crop nutrient after nitrogen and phosphorus. It has been used since antiquity as a soil fertilizer (about 90% of current use). Fertilizer use is the main driver behind potash consumption, especially for its use in fertilizing crops that contribute to high-protein diets. As of at least 2010, more than 95% of potash is mined for use in agricultural purposes.

Elemental potassium does not occur in nature because it reacts violently with water. As part of various compounds, potassium makes up about 2.6% of the Earth's crust by mass and is the seventh most abundant element, similar in abundance to sodium at approximately 1.8% of the crust. Potash is important for agriculture because it improves water retention, yield, nutrient value, taste, color, texture and disease resistance of food crops. It has wide application to fruit and vegetables, rice, wheat and other grains, sugar, corn, soybeans, palm oil and cotton, all of which benefit from the nutrient's quality-enhancing properties.

Demand for food and animal feed has been on the rise since 2000. The United States Department of Agriculture's Economic Research Service (ERS) attributes the trend to average annual population increases of 75 million people around the world. Geographically, economic growth in Asia and Latin America greatly contributed to the increased use of potash-based fertilizer. Rising incomes in developing countries also were a factor in the growing potash and fertilizer use. With more money in the household budget, consumers added more meat and dairy products to their diets. This shift in eating patterns required more acres to be planted, more fertilizer to be applied and more animals to be fed—all requiring more potash.

After years of trending upward, fertilizer use slowed in 2008. The worldwide economic downturn is the primary reason for the declining fertilizer use, dropping prices, and mounting inventories.

The world's largest consumers of potash are China, the United States, Brazil, and India. Brazil imports 90% of the potash it needs. Potash consumption for fertilizers is expected to increase to about 37.8 million tonnes by 2022.

Potash imports and exports are often reported in K_{2}O equivalent, although fertilizer never contains potassium oxide, per se, because potassium oxide is caustic and hygroscopic.

=== Pricing ===
At the beginning of 2008, potash prices started a meteoric climb from less than US$200 a tonne to a high of US$875 in February 2009. These subsequently dropped dramatically to an April 2010 low of US$310 level, before recovering in 2011–12, and relapsing again in 2013. For reference, prices in November 2011 were about US$470 per tonne, but as of May 2013 were stable at US$393. After the surprise breakup of the world's largest potash cartel at the end of July 2013, potash prices were poised to drop some 20 percent. At the end of December 2015, potash traded for US$295 a tonne. In April 2016 its price was US$269. In May 2017, prices had stabilised at around US$216 a tonne down 18% from the previous year. By January 2018, prices have been recovering to around US$225 a tonne. World potash demand tends to be price inelastic in the short-run and even in the long run.

=== Other uses ===
In addition to its use as a fertilizer, potassium chloride is important in many industrialized economies, where it is used in aluminium recycling, by the chloralkali industry to produce potassium hydroxide, in metal electroplating, oil-well drilling fluid, snow and ice melting, steel heat-treating, in medicine as a treatment for hypokalemia, and water softening. Potassium hydroxide is used for industrial water treatment and is the precursor of potassium carbonate, several forms of potassium phosphate, many other potassic chemicals, and soap manufacturing. Potassium carbonate is used to produce animal feed supplements, cement, fire extinguishers, food products, photographic chemicals, and textiles. It is also used in brewing beer, pharmaceutical preparations, and as a catalyst for synthetic rubber manufacturing. Also combined with silica sand to produce potassium silicate, sometimes known as waterglass, for use in paints and arc welding electrodes. These non-fertilizer uses have accounted for about 15% of annual potash consumption in the United States.

=== Substitutes ===
No substitutes exist for potassium as an essential plant nutrient and as an essential nutritional requirement for animals and humans. Manure and glauconite (greensand) are low-potassium-content sources that can be profitably transported only short distances to crop fields.

== See also ==
- Bone ash
- Saltpeter
- Saltwater soap
- Sodium hydroxide
