= Nutana Sector =

- Sector
- Interactive map of Nutana Sector
- Coordinates: 52°06′11″N 106°39′29″W
- Country: Canada
- Province: Saskatchewan
- City: Saskatoon

Area
  - Water: 0 km^{2} (0 sq mi) 0%

Population (2021)
  - Total: 72,564
- Postal Code: S7H
- Area code: 306

Nutana Sector, previously known as Nutana Suburban Development Area (SDA), is a sector in Saskatoon, Saskatchewan, Canada. It is a part of the east side community of Saskatoon, and should not be confused with Nutana, one of the neighbourhoods within the Core Neighbourhoods Sector. It lies (generally) north of the outskirts of the City and the Rural Municipality of Corman Park No. 344, west of Lakewood Sector, south of the Core Neighbourhoods Sector and University Sector, and east of the South Saskatchewan River and Confederation Sector.

== Neighbourhoods ==
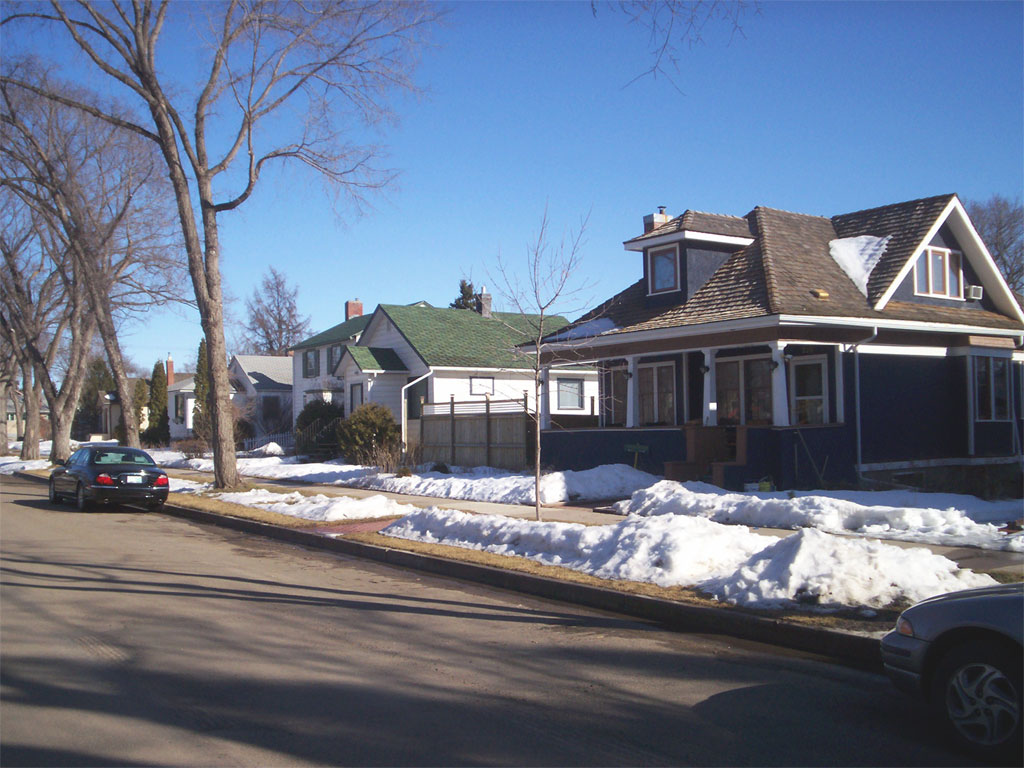
Buena Vista

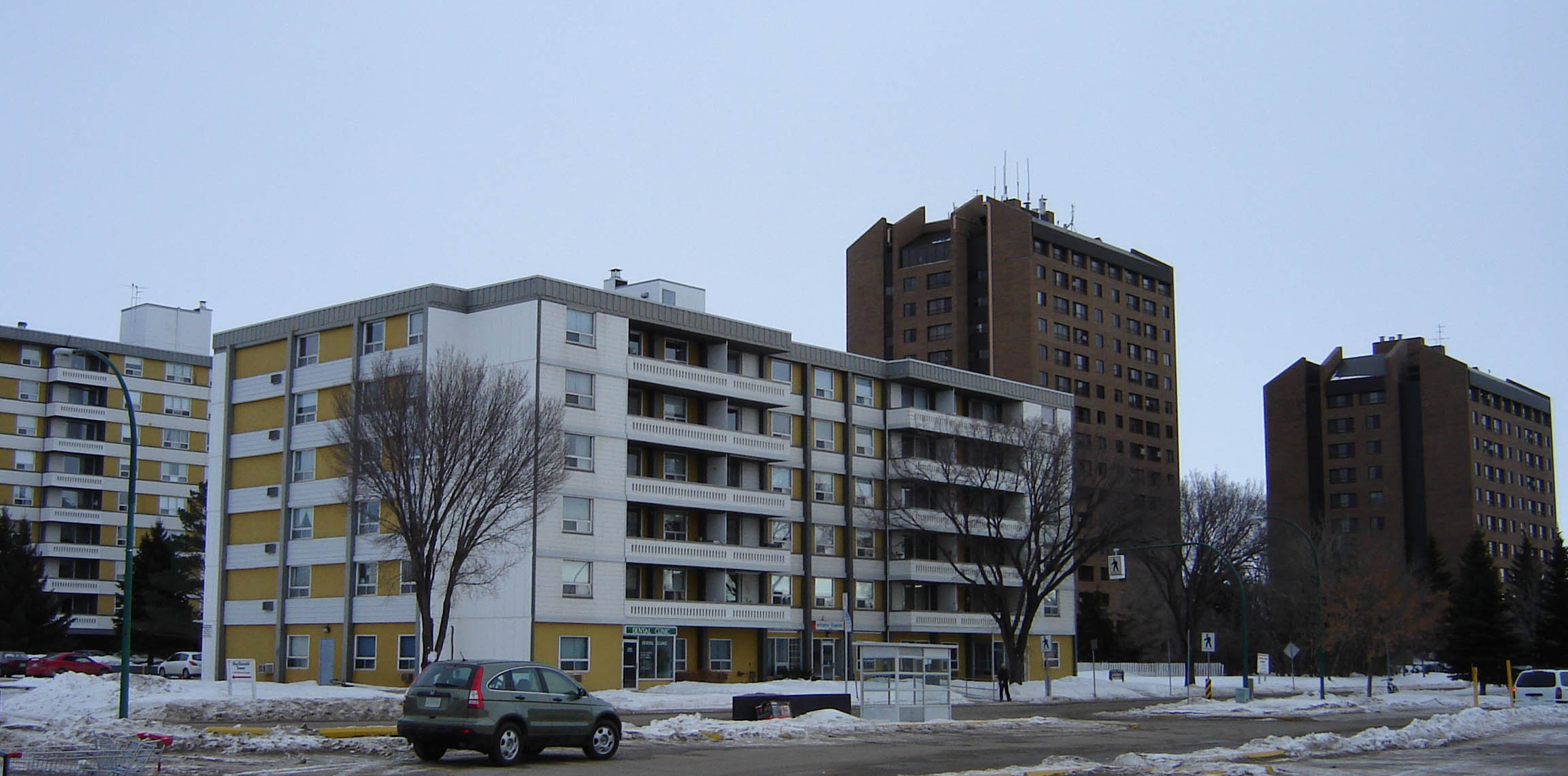
Nutana Suburban Centre

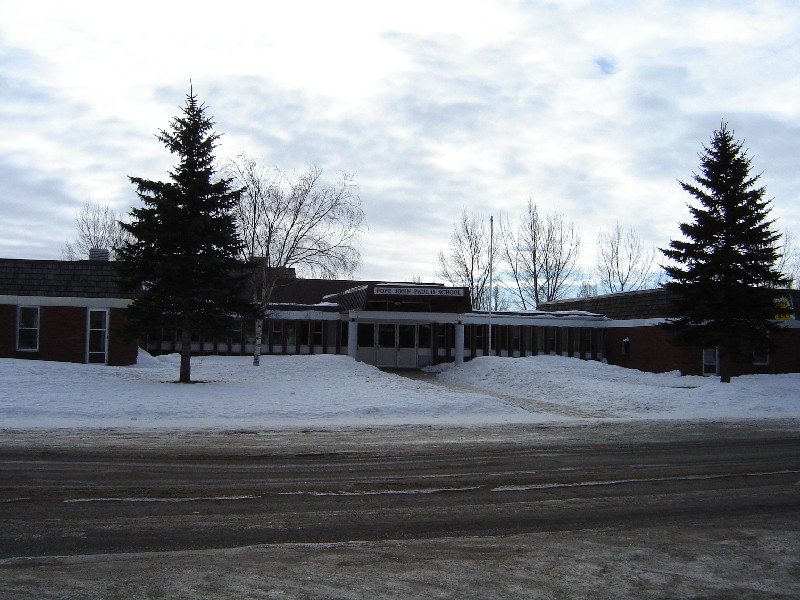
Eastview, Saskatoon

- Adelaide/Churchill
- Avalon
- Brevoort Park
- Buena Vista
- C.N. Industrial
- Eastview
- Exhibition
- Greystone Heights
- Grosvenor Park
- Haultain
- Holliston
- Nutana Park
- Nutana Urban Centre
- Queen Elizabeth
- Stonebridge
- The Willows

The Nutana Sector contains two areas slated for expansion:

- Stonebridge projected for 2005
- The Willows projected for 2004

== Recreation facilities ==
- Lathey Swimming Pool
- George Ward Swimming Pool

== Shopping ==
- Grosvenor Park Shopping Center
- Stonegate Wal-Mart Big Box Shopping complex

=== See also ===
- List of shopping malls in Saskatoon
- Circle Center Mall
- Market Mall
- Midtown Plaza

== Education ==
Nutana Sector is home to the following schools:

=== Separate education ===
==== Secondary schools ====
- Holy Cross High School

==== Elementary schools ====
- George Vanier School
- Pope John Paul II School
- St. Frances School
- St. Matthew School
- St. Philip School
- Sion Catholic Middle School

=== Public education ===
==== Secondary schools ====
- Aden Bowman Collegiate
- Walter Murray Collegiate

Secondary Schools of Saskatoon

==== Elementary schools ====
- Alvin Buckwold School
- Buena Vista School
- Brevoort Park School
- Greystone Heights School
- Holliston School
- Hugh Cairns School
- John Lake School
- Prince Philip School
- Queen Elizabeth School

=== Special education ===
- John Dolan School

== Defunct schools ==
- Albert School now a heritage site and community centre.
- Churchill School now the Saskatoon Full Gospel Church SFGC.
- Lorne Haselton school now the Saskatchewan Abilities Council
- Thornton School no longer exists.
- Victoria One Room School House heritage site on the U of S campus

== Library ==
- Saskatoon Public Library J.S. Wood Library

== Transportation ==
=== City transit ===
The following routes serve the area. There is a bus terminal at Market Mall where routes 1, 6 and 12 meet.

- 1 Wildwood – Westview
- 2 8th Street – 8th Street
- 5 Briarwood – Fairhaven
- 6 Broadway – Clarence
- 11 Exhibition – Airport
- 12 River Heights – Stonebridge
- 13 Exhibition – Lawson
- 50 Lakeview – Pacific Heights
- 60 Lakeridge – Confederation
