= Greystone Heights, Saskatoon =

Greystone Heights
- City of Saskatoon neighbourhood
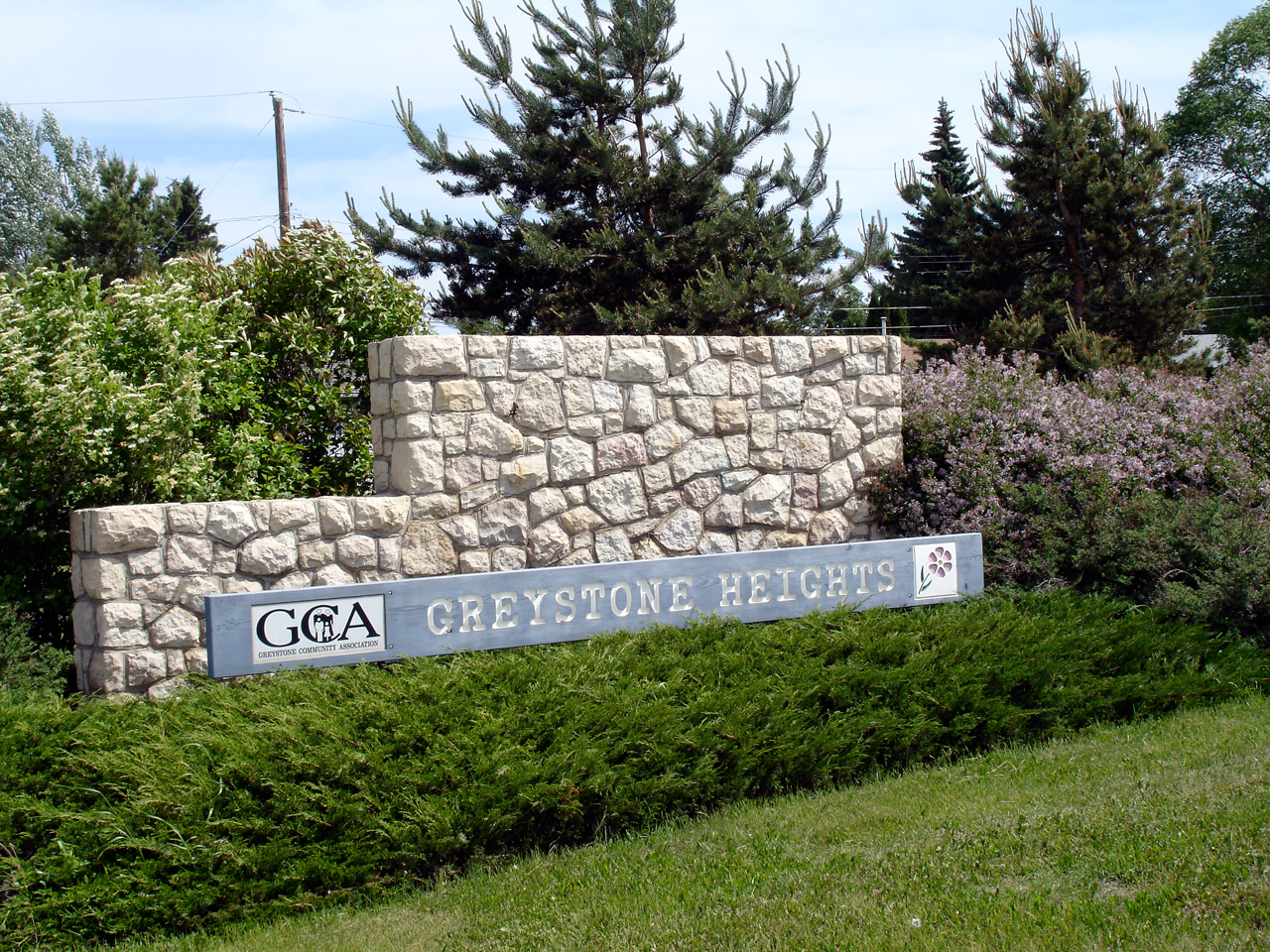
- Greystone Heights entrance sign

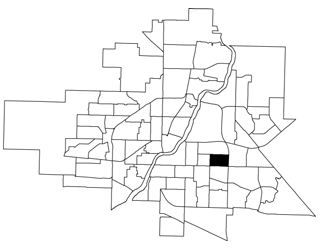
- Greystone Heights location map
- Coordinates: 52°7′10″N 106°36′49″W
- Country: Canada
- Province: Saskatchewan
- City: Saskatoon
- Suburban Development Area: Nutana
- Neighbourhood: Greystone Heights
- Annexed: 1955-1959
- Construction: 1946-1980

Government
  - Type: Municipal (Ward 8)
  - Administrative body: Saskatoon City Council
  - Councillor: Sarina Gersher

Area
  - Total: 0.98 km^{2} (0.38 sq mi)

Population (2007)
  - Total: 2,525
  - Average Income: $58,811
- Time zone: UTC-6 (UTC)
- Website: Greystone Heights Community Association

Greystone Heights is a mostly residential neighbourhood located in east-central Saskatoon, Saskatchewan, Canada. It is a suburban subdivision, consisting mostly of low-density, single detached dwellings and a sizeable minority of apartment-style multiple-unit dwellings. As of 2007, the area is home to 2,525 residents. The neighbourhood is considered a middle-income area, with an average family income of $58,811, an average dwelling value of $241,850 and a home ownership rate of 58.1%.

== History ==
According to a 1913 map of registered subdivisions, Greystone Heights was originally split in two sections called Queens Park and Queens Park Addition, the latter of which overlapped into the present-day College Park neighbourhood. The land for the neighbourhood was annexed by the city between 1955 and 1959. The majority of home construction took place between 1961 and 1970, and was generally completed by 1980. The street names are mainly those of Canadian universities and professors.

== Government and politics ==
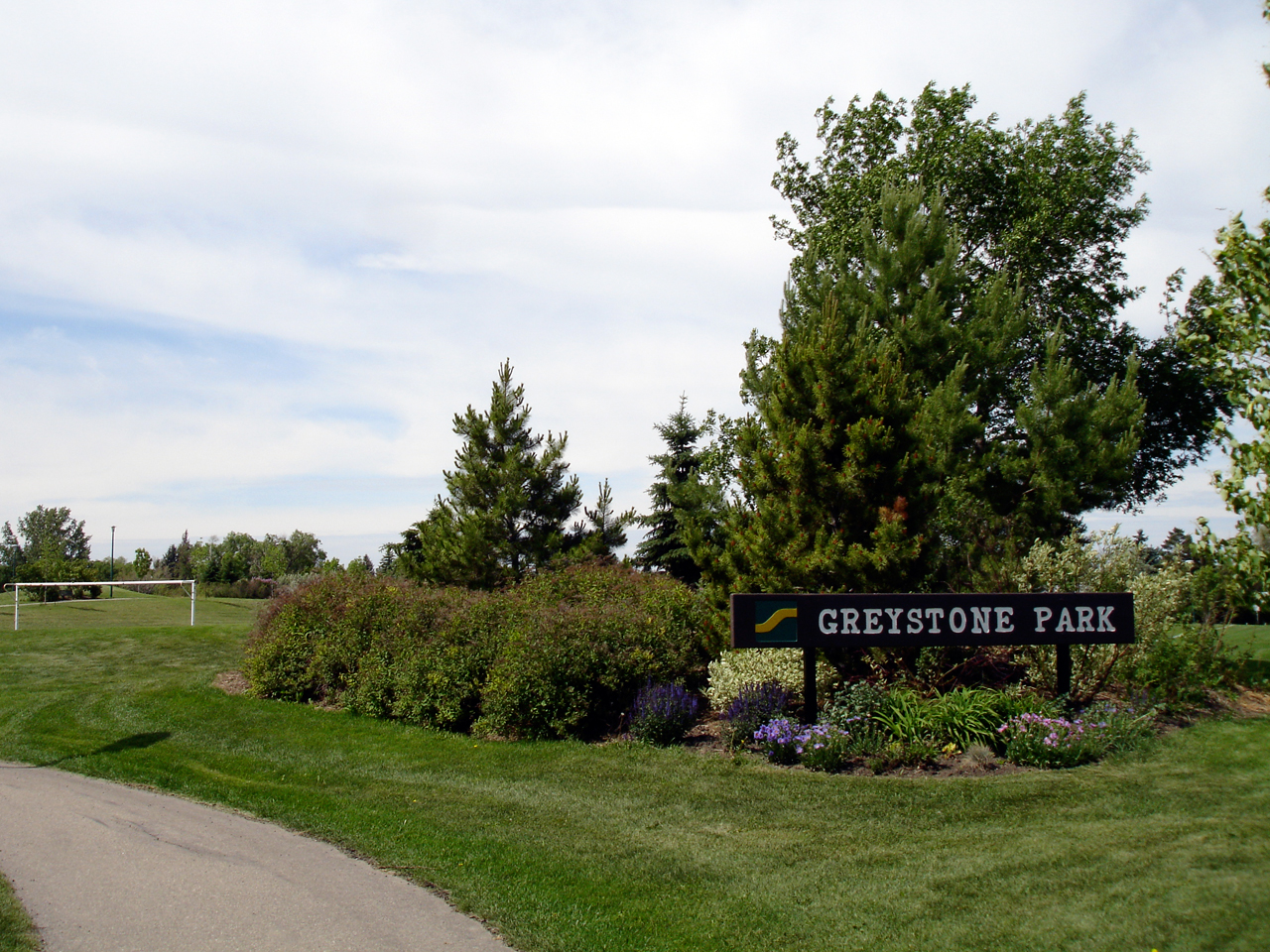
Greystone Park

Greystone Heights exists within the federal electoral district of Saskatoon—University. It is currently represented by Corey Tochor of the Conservative Party of Canada, who was first elected in 2019.

Provincially, Greystone Heights lies within the constituency of Saskatoon University. It is currently represented by Jennifer Bowes the Saskatchewan New Democratic Party first elected in 2020.

In Saskatoon's non-partisan municipal politics, Greystone Heights lies within ward 8. It is currently represented by Councillor Sarina Gersher, who was first elected in 2016.

== Institutions ==
=== Education ===
Greystone Heights School
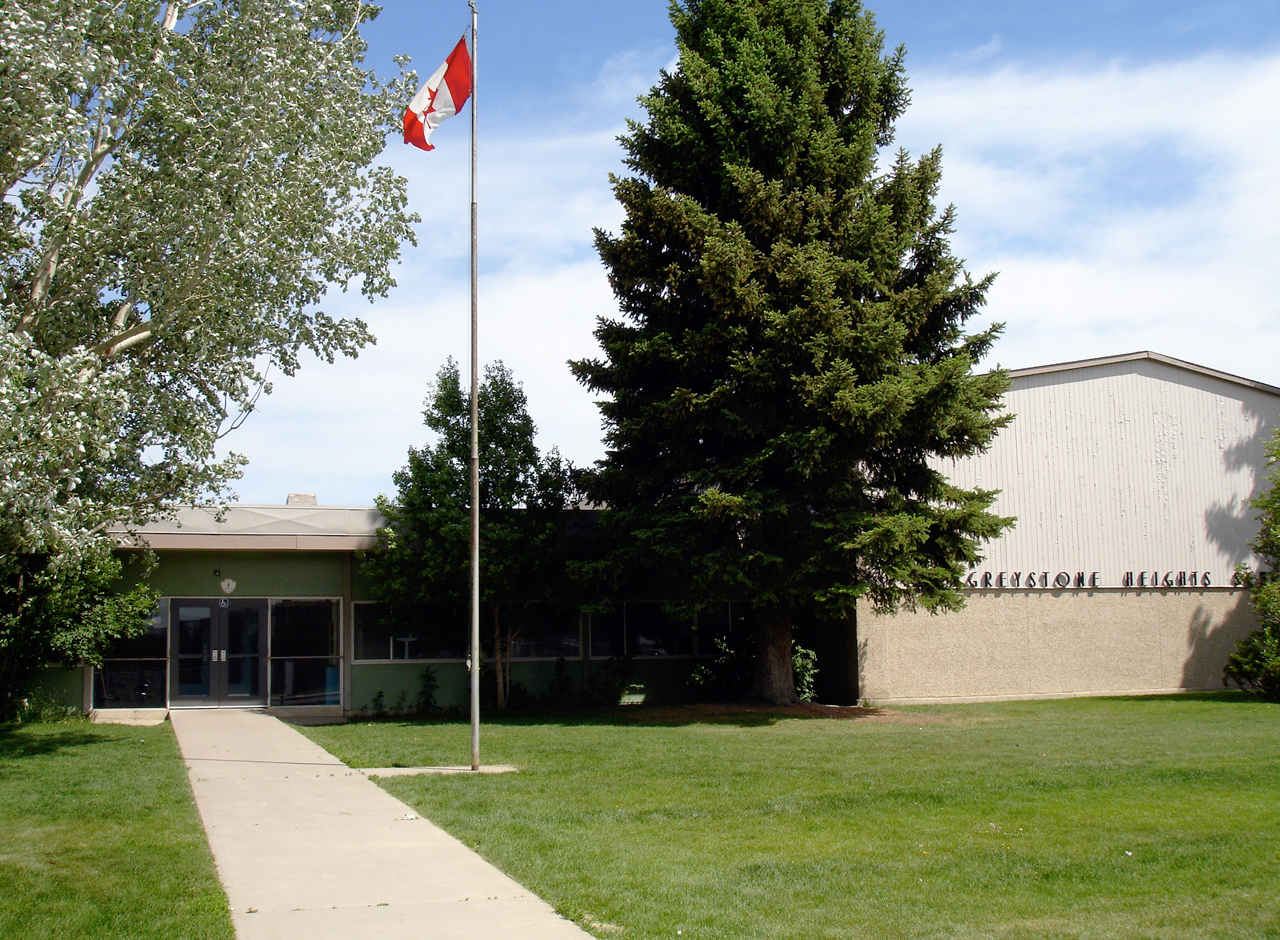

Location
- 2721 Main Street; Saskatoon, Saskatchewan, S7H 0M2; Canada

Information
- Type: Elementary
- Opened: 1961
- School board: Saskatoon Public School Division
- Principal: Dawn Harkness
- Grades: Kindergarten to Grade 8
- Enrollment: 396 (2017)
- Education system: Public
- Language: English
- Website: Greystone Heights School

St. Frances Cree Bilingual School - Bateman
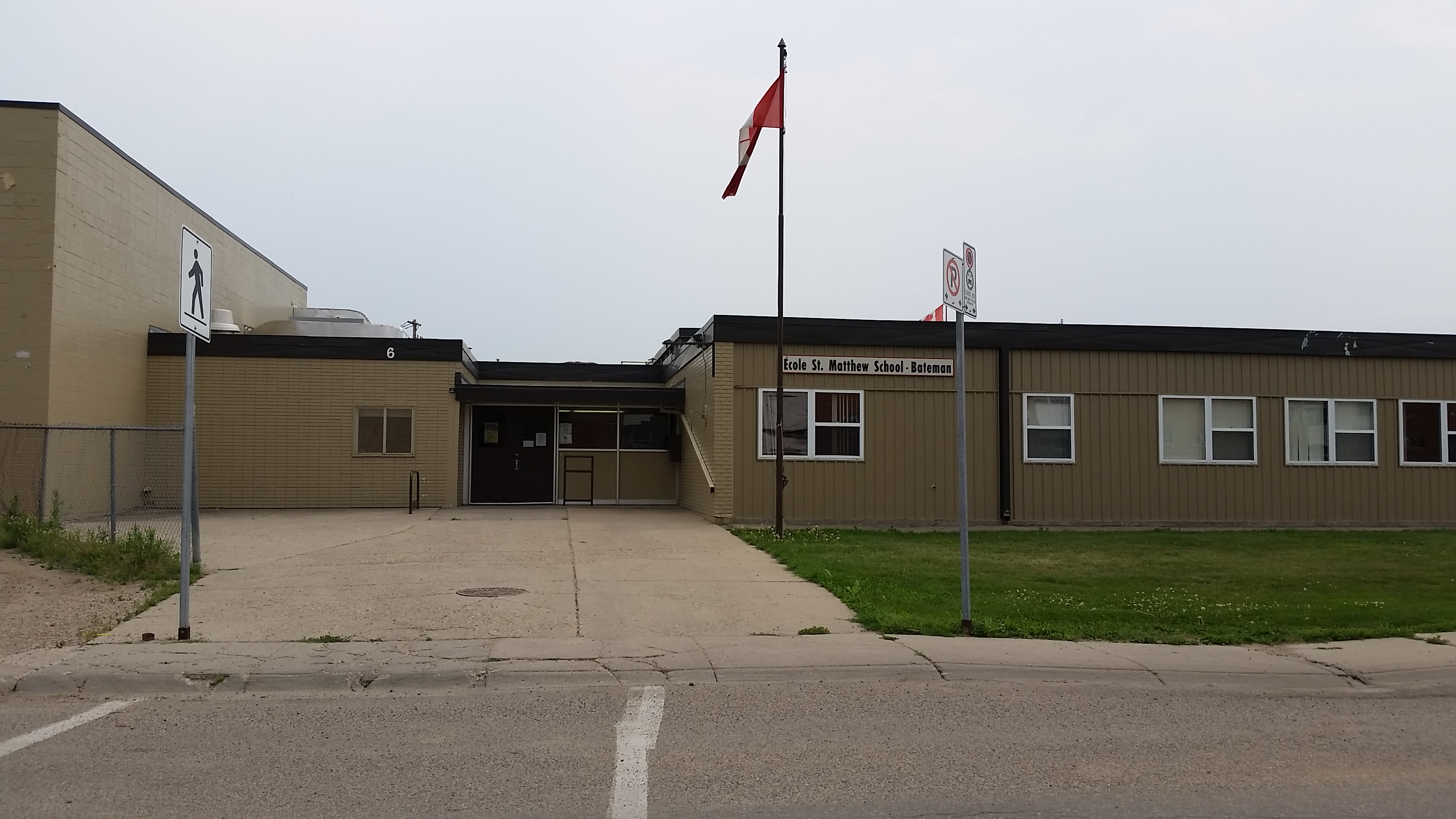

Location
- 6 Bateman Crescent; Saskatoon, Saskatchewan, S7H 3C2; Canada

Information
- Type: Elementary
- Religious affiliation: Catholic
- Opened: 1963
- School board: Greater Saskatoon Catholic Schools
- Principal: Lori McAuley
- Grades: Grade 6 to Grade 8
- Education system: Separate
- Language: English, Cree
- Website: St. Frances Cree Bilingual School

- Greystone Heights School - public elementary, part of the Saskatoon Public School Division opened in 1961. This school features the Academically Gifted (SAGE) program, which runs from grade 5–8.
- St. Patrick School - separate (Catholic) elementary, part of Greater Saskatoon Catholic Schools. Originally opened in 1963 as St. Patrick School, the building is home to Grades 6 to 8 for St. Frances Cree Bilangual School. It had previously hosted École St. Matthew School grades 4 through 8 while its primary facility underwent major renovations.

== Parks and recreation ==
- Morton Park (0.2 acres)
- St. Patrick Park (1.4 acres)
- Holland Park (1.7 acres)
- Albert Milne Park (1.9 acres)
- Greystone Park (10.9 acres)

The Greystone Heights Community Association delivers a variety of recreational and leisure programs and coordinating sports programs so local children can participate in softball, baseball, soccer, and basketball. It also represents the interests of residents and promotes a sense of community in the area.

== Commercial ==
Commercial development is limited to the southern edge of the neighbourhood, where businesses lie within the 8th Street business district. Among these are several big-box stores, mostly on the north side of the street, including a location of Real Canadian Superstore; a Saskatoon Co-op grocery store operated in the area from the 1960s until 2014, when it relocated to The Centre mall (an affiliated business, Co-op Home Centre, took over the grocery store's former location in 2017). In addition, there are 29 home-based businesses in the neighbourhood. The northeast corner of 8th Street East and Preston Avenue was the location of the Starlite Drive-In from 1950 to 1968, after which the land was redeveloped for a car dealership, residential, and other retail use.

== Location ==
Greystone Heights is located within the Nutana Suburban Development Area. It is bounded by 14th Street to the north, 8th Street to the south, Preston Avenue to the west, and Circle Drive to the east. Roads are laid out in a mix of local and collector roads.
