= Holliston, Saskatoon =

Holliston
- City of Saskatoon neighbourhood
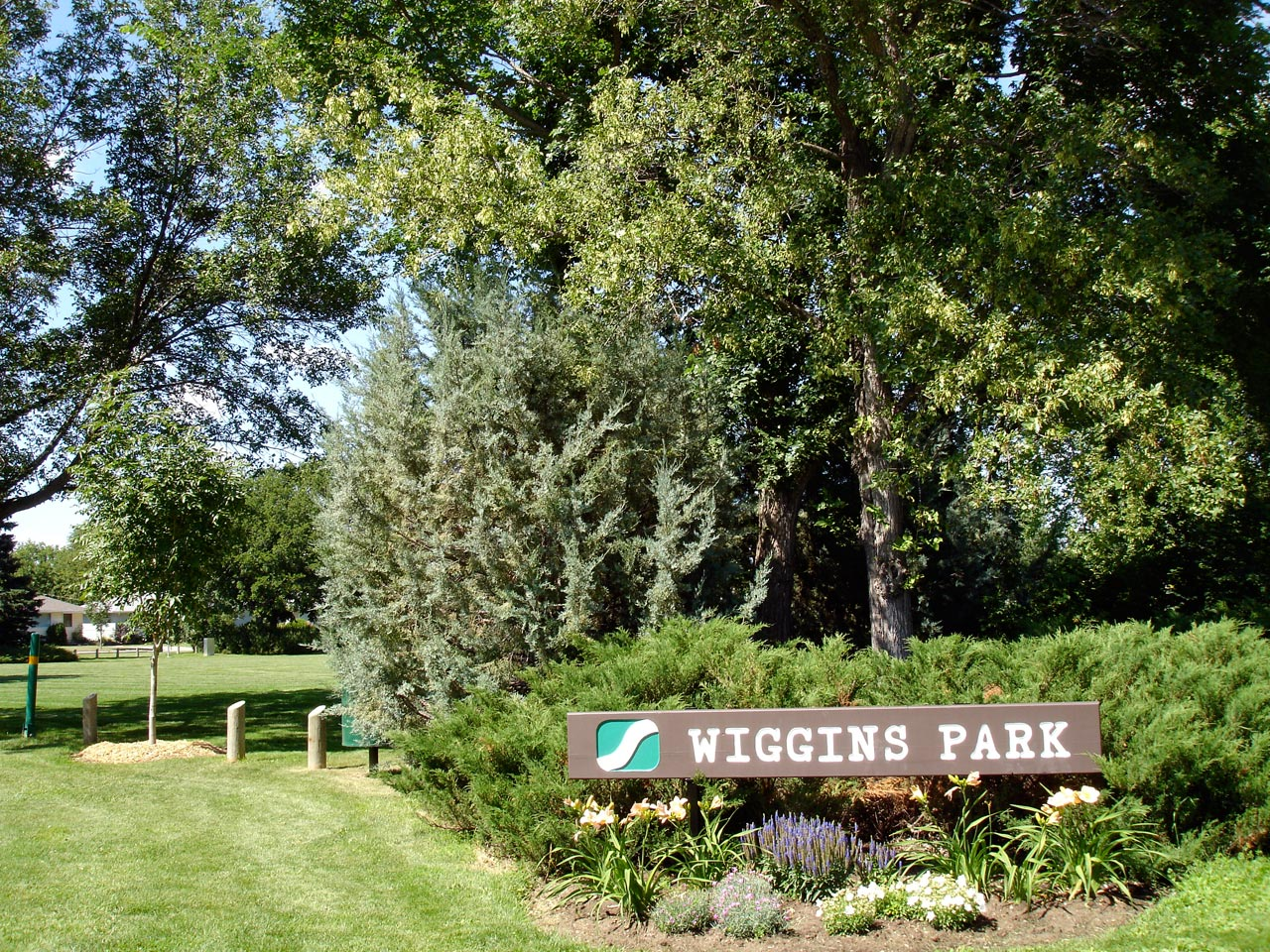
- Wiggins Park

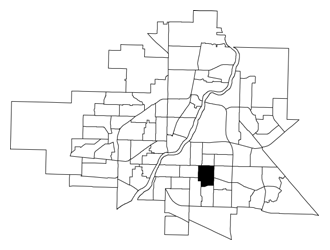
- Holliston location map
- Coordinates: 52°6′39″N 106°37′48″W
- Country: Canada
- Province: Saskatchewan
- City: Saskatoon
- Suburban Development Area: Nutana
- Neighbourhood: Holliston
- Annexed: 1955-1959
- Construction: 1961-1970

Government
  - Type: Municipal (Ward 6)
  - Administrative body: Saskatoon City Council
  - Councillor: Jasmin Parker

Area
  - Total: 1.22 km^{2} (0.47 sq mi)

Population (2024)
  - Total: 3,999
  - Median personal income: $40,000
- Time zone: UTC-6 (UTC)
- Website: Holliston Community Association

Holliston is a primarily residential neighbourhood located in the southeast part of Saskatoon, Saskatchewan, Canada. It includes part of the 8th Street business district. Just over half of its dwellings are single detached houses, with a sizeable minority of duplex or apartment-style multiple unit dwellings. As of 2024, the area is home to 3,999 residents. The neighbourhood is considered a middle-income area, with a median personal income of $40,000, and a home ownership rate of 59%.

== History ==
The land where Holliston now exists was annexed in the period between 1911 and 1919. On a 1913 map of registered subdivisions, the land was divided into several parcels, with names such as Nutana Hill, University Homes, Nutana Park and University Park. The area was not actively developed until after World War II, with home construction at its peak from 1946 until 1970. Holliston School was built in 1956. The Edmund Heights low-income property was developed in the 1950s as one of several limited dividend housing projects constructed in Saskatoon.

== Government and politics ==
Holliston exists within the federal electoral district of Saskatoon—Grasswood. It is currently represented by Kevin Waugh of the Conservative Party of Canada, first elected in 2015.

Provincially, the area is divided by Louise Avenue and Isabella Street into the constituencies of Saskatoon Churchill-Wildwood and Saskatoon Eastview. Saskatoon Churchill-Wildwood is currently represented by Keith Jorgenson of the Saskatchewan New Democratic Party since 2024. Saskatoon Eastview is currently represented by Matt Love of the Saskatchewan New Democratic Party since 2020.

In Saskatoon's non-partisan municipal politics, Holliston lies within ward 6. It is represented by Councillor Jasmine Parker, first elected in 2024.

== Institutions ==
=== Education ===
Holliston School
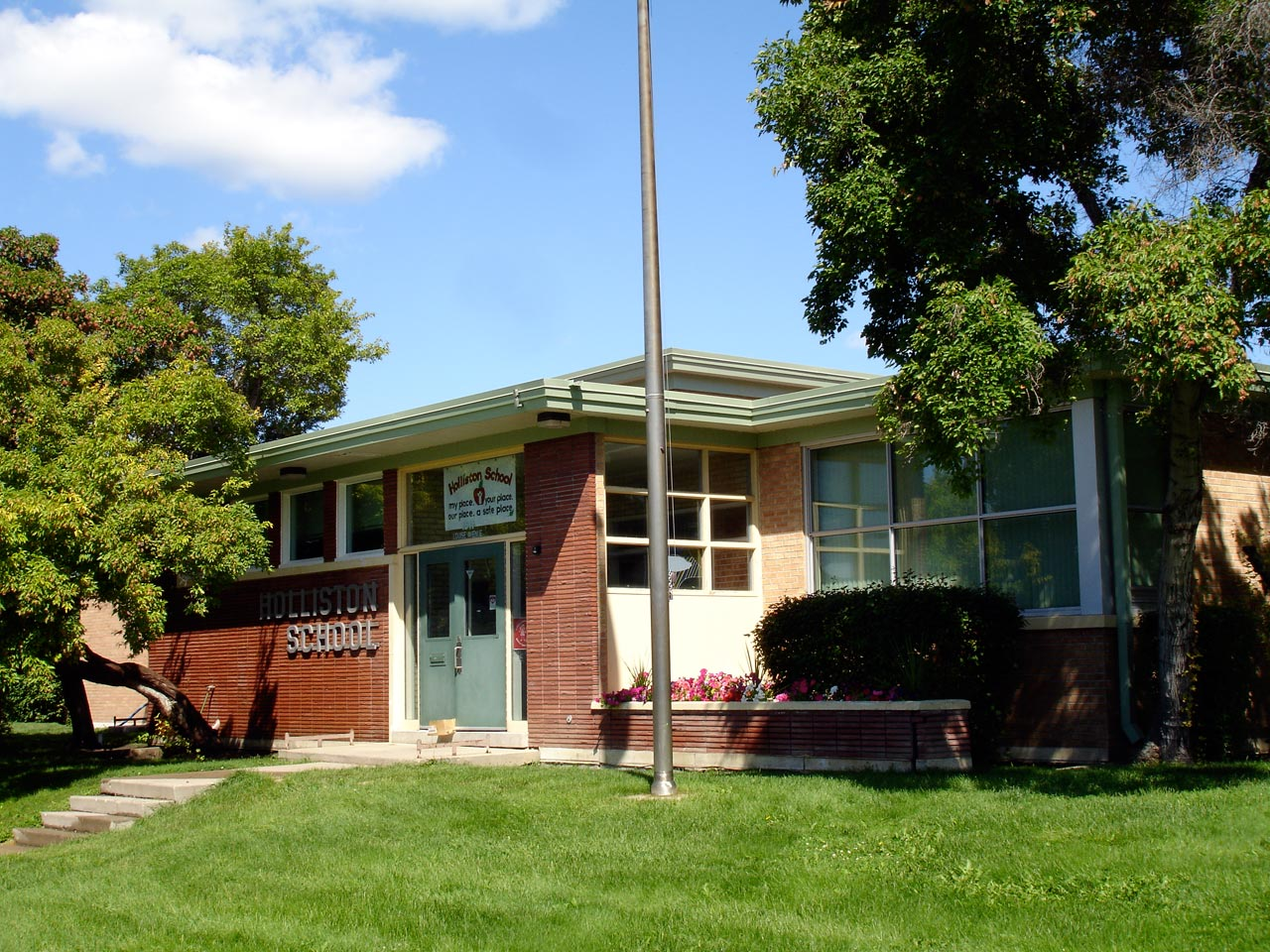

Location
- 1511 Louise Avenue; Saskatoon, Saskatchewan, S7H 2R2; Canada

Information
- Type: Elementary
- School board: Saskatoon Public School Division
- Principal: Tammy Wuttnnee
- Grades: Kindergarten to Grade 8
- Enrollment: 279 (2025)
- Education system: Public
- Language: English
- Feeder to: Walter Murray Collegiate
- Website: Holliston School

awâsisak kâ-nîmîhtocik St. Francis School

Location
- 2010 7th St E Saskatoon, Saskatchewan, S7H 5K6; Canada

Information
- Type: Secondary
- Religious affiliation: Catholic
- Opened: 2025
- School board: Greater Saskatoon Catholic Schools
- Principal: Darren Fradette
- Grades: Kindergarten to Grade 9
- Enrollment: 655 (2025)
- Education system: Separate
- Language: English, Cree

- awâsisak kâ-nîmîhtocik St. Francis School - separate (Catholic) elementary school, part of Greater Saskatoon Catholic Schools. St. Francis opened in 2025 on the site of the former Sion Middle School. The school is unique to the division in providing Cree language and Indigenous cultural programming.
- Holliston School - public elementary, part of the Saskatoon Public School Division. It was opened in 1956 and was named after William Holliston, who taught in Saskatoon schools from 1903 to 1940. Alumni of note include Shaun Verrault and Safwan Javed, who met and became friends at school. They would go on to form the band Wide Mouth Mason.

awâsisak kâ-nîmîhtocik St. Francis School was built on the site of the former St. Charles school, later operating as Sion Middle School. Sion Middle School was an alternative program school for Grades 6 to 9, where students were taught individualized academics with practical arts, guidance and behavioral support. Because of declining enrolment, the school board decided to close the school at the end of the 2009–2010 school year. Following closure of Sion Middle School, the building was leased to the Saskatoon Tribal Council until its demolition in fall 2021 to prepare for the new facility to be built on the site.

== Parks and recreation ==
- Jeffrey Park - 0.8 acres (0.32 ha)
- Wiggins Park - 2.9 acres (1.2 ha)
- Canon Smith Park - 4.6 acres (1.9 ha)
- Holliston Park - 5.4 acres (2.2 ha)

George Ward Pool is a public swimming pool that operates during the summer months. It opened on July 29, 1965 and was named after George Ward, a longtime administrator, official and organizer of sport programs in Saskatchewan.

The Holliston Community Association serves Holliston as well as the east part of the Haultain neighbourhood. It operates programs including sports for children/youth and fitness, recreation and leisure for all ages.

== Commercial ==
Holliston's northern border is part of the 8th Street business district. 91 home-based businesses exist in the neighbourhood as of 2024.

== Location ==
Holliston is located within the Nutana Suburban Development Area. It is bounded by 8th Street to the north, Preston Avenue to the east, Isabella and Adelaide Streets to the south, and Wiggins and Cumberland Avenues to the west. Louise Avenue, a collector road, roughly bisects the neighbourhood from north to south. Taylor Street, an arterial road, divides the neighbourhood into a northern two-thirds part and southern one-third part. Streets are laid out in both traditional grid and modern curved patterns. Streets are named after early pioneers from the Saskatoon area.
