= Grosvenor Park, Saskatoon =

Grosvenor Park
- City of Saskatoon neighbourhood
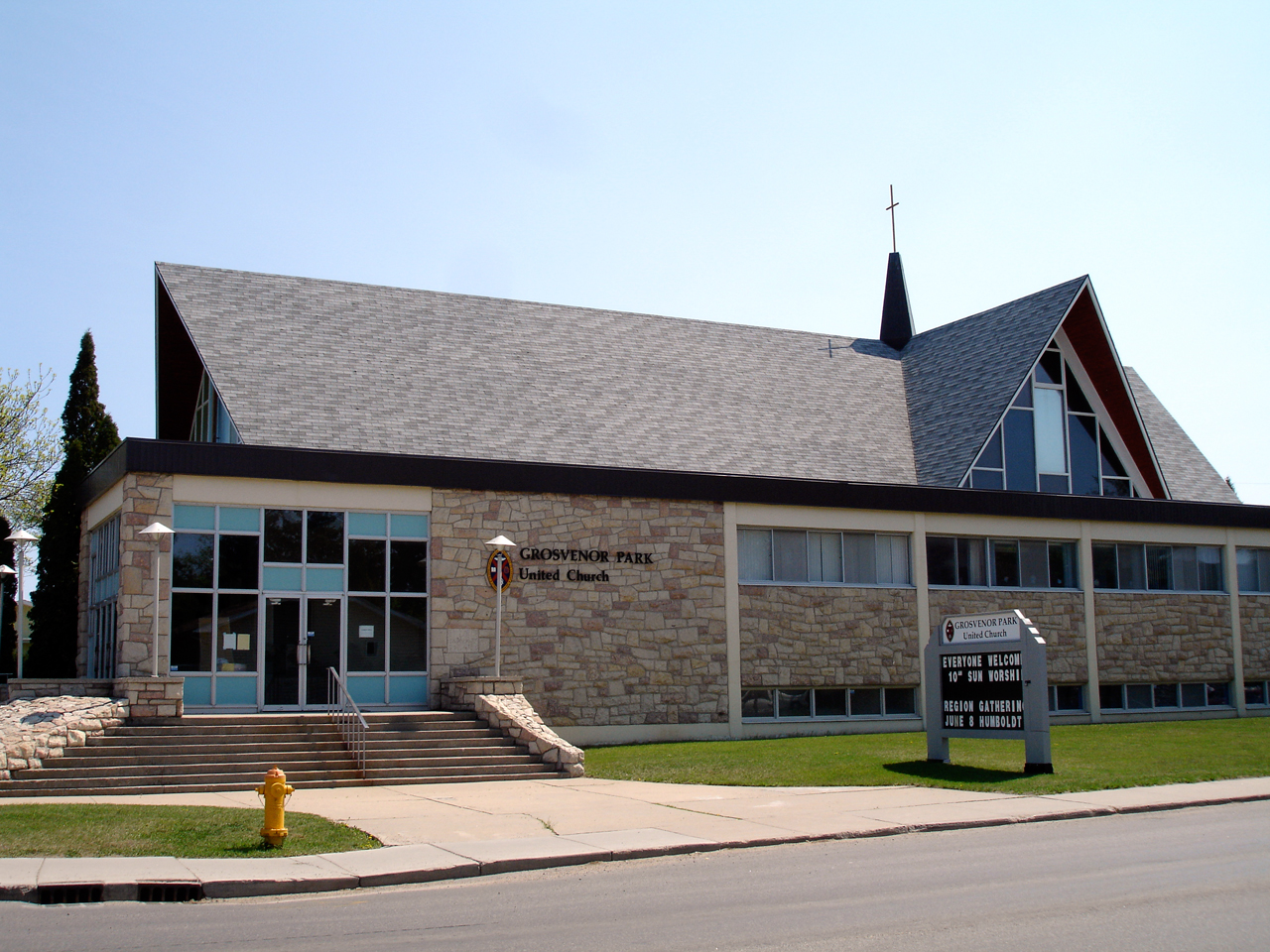
- Grosvenor Park United Church

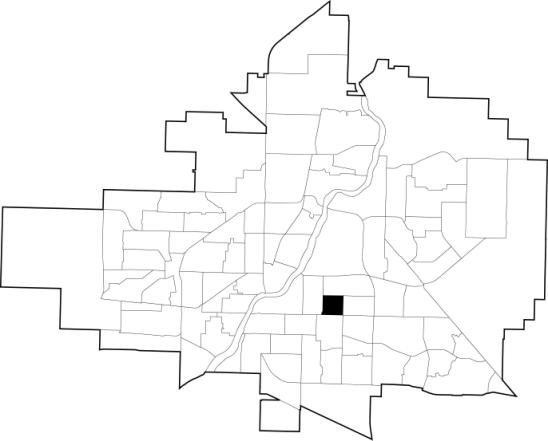
- Grosvenor Park location map
- Coordinates: 52°7′5″N 106°37′50″W
- Country: Canada
- Province: Saskatchewan
- City: Saskatoon
- Suburban Development Area: Nutana
- Neighbourhood: Grosvenor Park
- Annexed: 1910-1919
- Construction: 1946-1970

Government
  - Type: Municipal (Ward 6)
  - Administrative body: Saskatoon City Council
  - Councillor: Cynthia Block

Area
  - Total: 0.65 km^{2} (0.25 sq mi)

Population (2006)
  - Total: 1,697
  - Average Income: $91,870
- Time zone: UTC-6 (UTC)
- Website: Varsity View Community Association

Grosvenor Park is a mostly residential neighbourhood located in east-central Saskatoon, Saskatchewan, Canada. It is a suburban subdivision, composed of a near-even mix of low-density, single detached dwellings and apartment-style units. As of 2006, the area is home to 1,645 residents. The neighbourhood is considered an upper-income area, with an average family income of $67,544, an average dwelling value of $329,988 and a home ownership rate of 44.8%.

== History ==
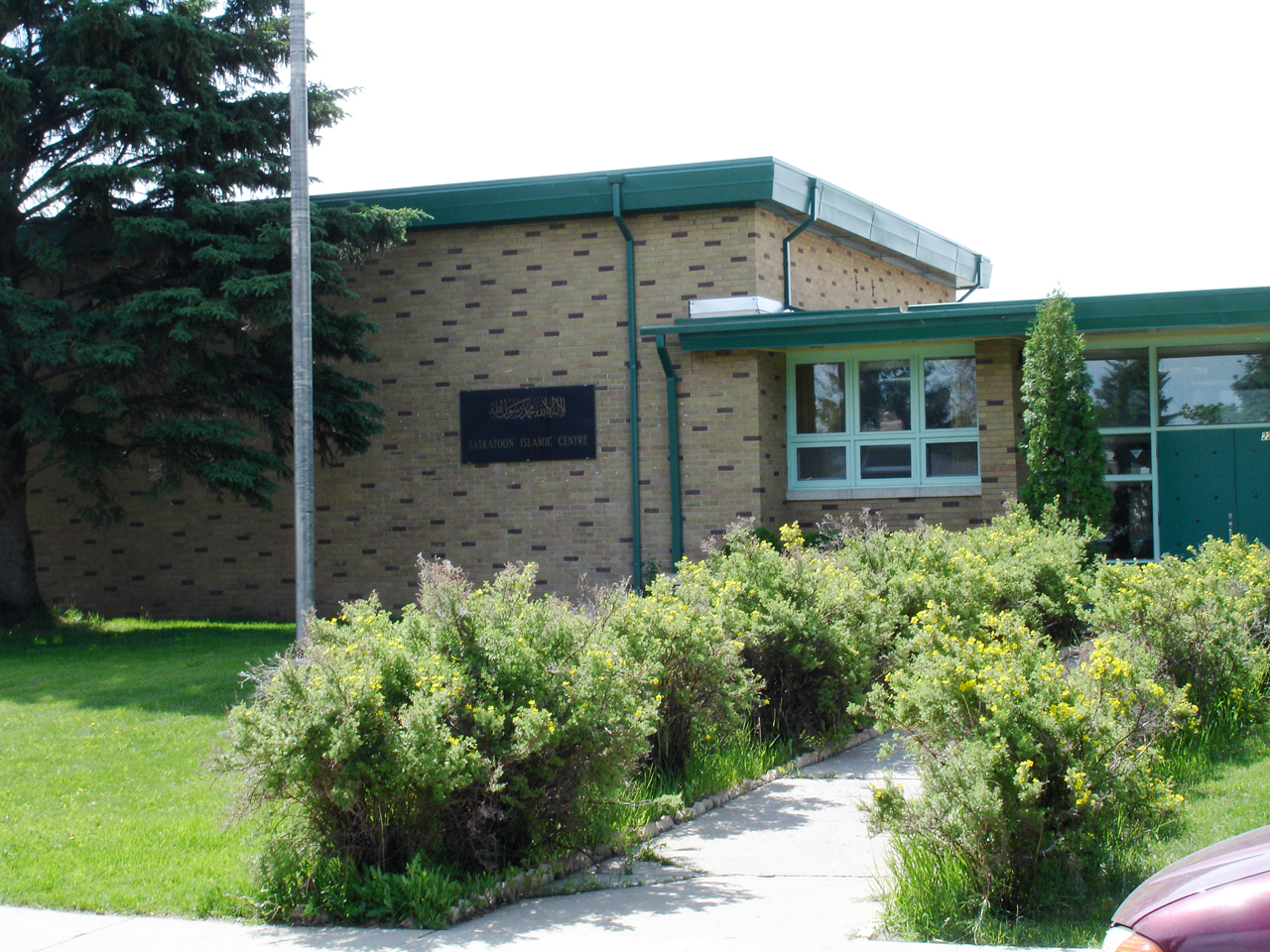
Saskatoon Islamic Centre (formerly Grosvenor Park School)

The land for the Grosvenor Park neighbourhood was annexed by the city between 1910 and 1919. According to a 1913 map of registered subdivisions, the neighbourhood was originally split in two sections called University View and Alexandra Park. By the 1950s, the design of residential neighbourhoods departed from the previous grid system of roadways. A more modern system of curving residential streets, feeding into collector roads that connected to arterial roads was implemented, and the size of the development was based upon the drawing area of an elementary school. The philosophy was to create smaller, more aesthetically pleasing neighbourhoods with fewer intersections and more controlled traffic flow. Grosvenor Park was the first such neighbourhood designed with this idea in mind. The majority of home construction occurred between 1946 and 1970 and was predominantly finished by 1980.

The street names honour prominent early settlers of Nutana:

- Bate Crescent - W.P. Bate, first Secretary Treasurer of the Saskatoon Public School Board.
- Copland Crescent, Court - Copland, Thomas (1842-1906), city councillor (1903-1904).
- Garrison Crescent - George Wesley Garrison, pioneer. He built a two-storey fieldstone house on the northwest corner of Broadway Avenue and 10th Street. In 1918 it was dismantled down to the stone foundation and rebuilt with concrete and brick veneer.
- Isbister Street - Malcolm Scarth Halsetter Isbister, mayor of Saskatoon (1905) and president of the Board of Trade.
- Lake Crescent - John Lake, first commissioner of the Temperance Colonization Society and recognized founder of Saskatoon.
- Latham Place - Peter Latham (1835-1912), 2nd president of the Temperance Colony Pioneers' Society (1882)
- Leslie Avenue - James Leslie, moved to Saskatoon with the Temperance Colony. He opened a general store (1896) and flour milling/grain company (1906) with future mayor James R. Wilson. In 1903 he was president of the newly formed Board of Trade.

Grosvenor Park School opened in 1958 and was named after the subdivision as it was the first school in the area. Due to declining enrolment, the school was closed and in 1993, the building was purchased by the Muslim Community of Saskatoon. Today it is the Saskatoon Islamic Centre.

== Government and politics ==
Grosvenor Park exists within the federal electoral district of Saskatoon—University. It is currently represented by Corey Tochor of the Conservative Party of Canada, who was first elected in 2019.

Provincially, Grosvenor Park lies within the constituency of Saskatoon University. It is currently represented by Eric Olauson of the Saskatchewan Party, first elected in 2016.

In Saskatoon's non-partisan municipal politics, Grosvenor Park lies within ward 6. It is currently represented by Councillor Cynthia Block, first elected in 2016.

== Institutions ==
=== Education ===
Saskatoon Misbah School

Location
- 222 Copland Crescent; Saskatoon, Saskatchewan, S7K 3J8; Canada; 52.118205°N 106.630629°W

Information
- Type: Elementary/Secondary
- Religious affiliation: Islamic
- Opened: 2000
- School board: Saskatoon Public Schools (Associate)
- Principal: Mohamed Hajinoor
- Grades: Pre-Kindergarten to Grade 9
- Enrollment: 197 (2017)
- Education system: Public
- Language: English
- Website: Saskatoon Misbah School

A former public elementary school, Grosvenor Park School, is now the Saskatoon Islamic Centre; they offer Quranic, Arabic and other Islamic studies on weekends during five months of the year. Public elementary school students who reside in the neighbourhood attend Brunskill School in neighboring Varsity View. In 2008, the Saskatoon Public School Division made the private Saskatoon Misbah School an associate school, which operates out of the Islamic Centre.

== Parks and recreation ==
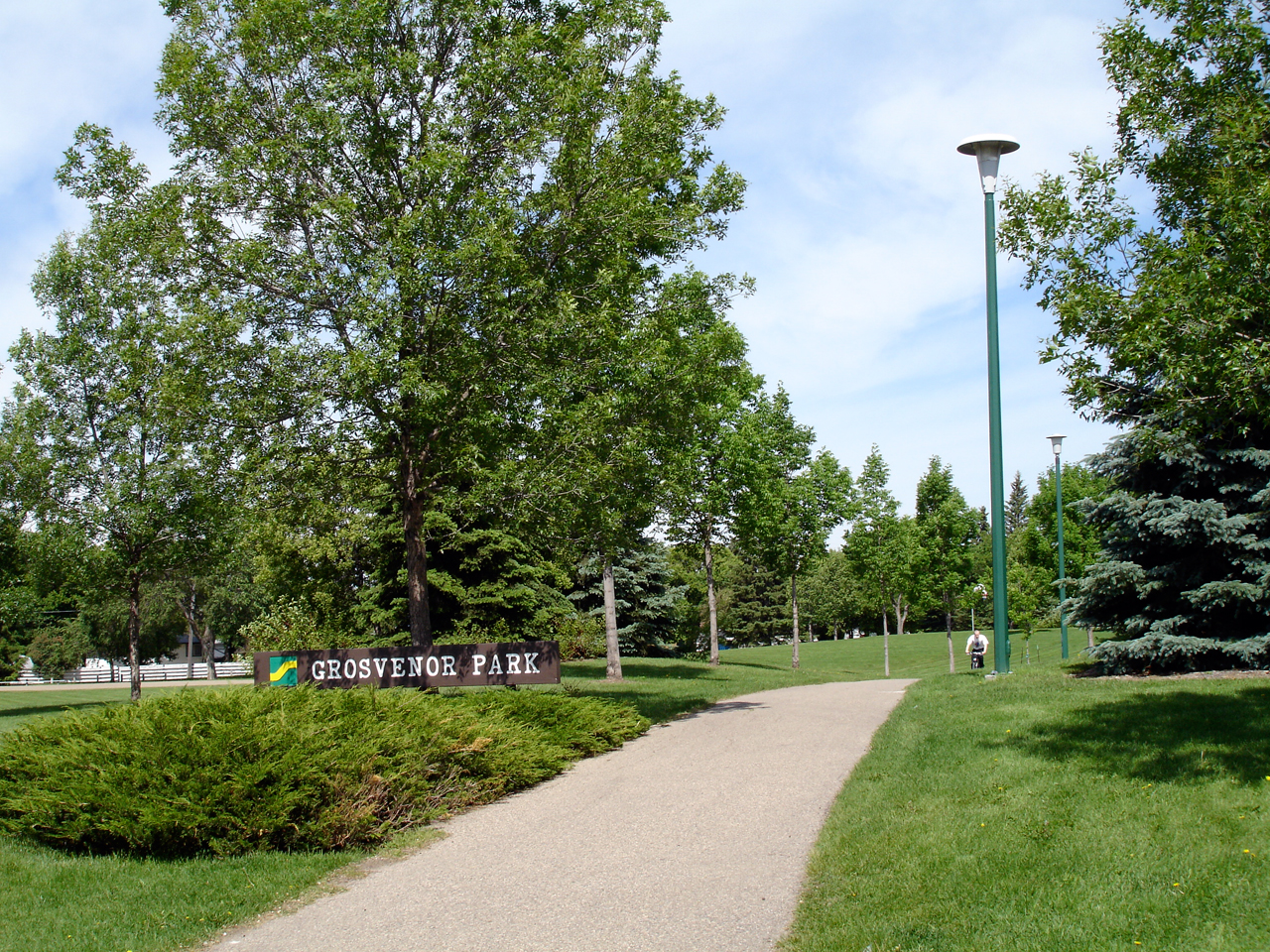
Grosvenor Park

- Albert Olton Park - 0.9 acres (0.36 ha)
- Latham Park - 1.0 acre (0.40 ha)
- Rod V. Real Park - 1.6 acres (0.65 ha)
- Grosvenor Park - 6.8 acres (2.8 ha)

The Varsity View Community Association organizes events, delivers recreational and leisure programs, coordinates sports programs for children/youth and maintains the outdoor rink at Brunskill School. Its jurisdiction includes the neighbourhood of Grosvenor Park.

== Commercial ==
Commercial development is limited to the southern edge of the neighbourhood, where businesses lie within the 8th Street business district. Grosvenor Park Centre, a large strip mall complex with about 30 businesses, is located on the corner of 8th Street and Preston Avenue. Opened in June 1960, it is Saskatoon's second-oldest shopping centre; the Churchill Shopping Centre in the Adelaide/Churchill neighbourhood is the oldest. Another large strip mall complex is Cumberland Square, on the corner of 8th Street and Cumberland Avenue. In 2017 Cumberland Square underwent major redevelopment that included a new Save-On grocery store. In addition, there are 19 home-based businesses in the neighbourhood.

== Location ==
Grosvenor Park is located within the Nutana Suburban Development Area. It is bounded by 14th Street to the north, 8th Street to the south, Cumberland Avenue to the west, and Preston Avenue to the east. Roads are laid out in a mix of crescents and avenues. Main Street is a minor arterial street in the south part of the neighbourhood, separating the single detached housing area to the north from the apartment buildings to the south.
