= Eastview, Saskatoon =

Eastview
- Neighbourhood
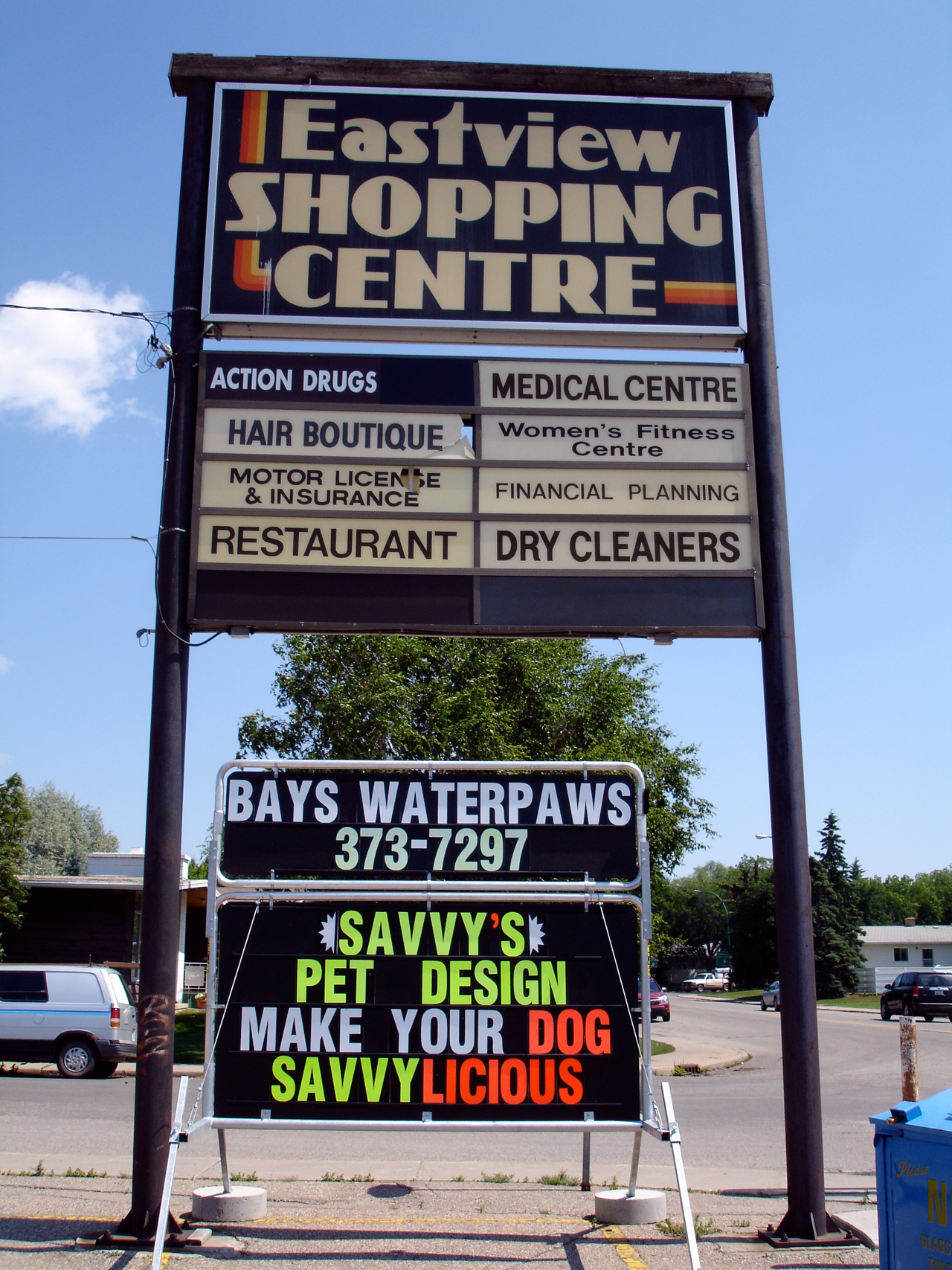
- Eastview Shopping Centre

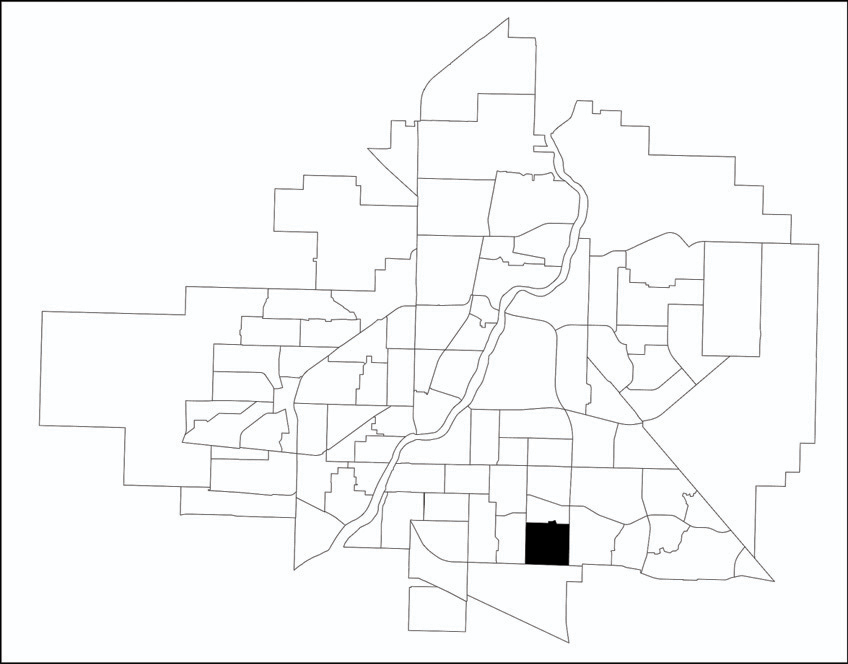
- Eastview location map
- Coordinates: 52°5′45″N 106°36′50″W
- Country: Canada
- Province: Saskatchewan
- City: Saskatoon
- Suburban Development Area: Nutana
- Neighbourhood: Eastview
- Annexed: 1910-1919
- Construction: 1946-1960

Government
  - Type: Municipal (Ward 9)
  - Administrative body: Saskatoon City Council
  - Councillor: Bev Dubois

Area
  - Total: 1.5 km^{2} (0.58 sq mi)

Population (2025)
  - Total: 4,070
  - Median personal income: $42,000
- Time zone: UTC-6 (UTC)
- Website: Eastview Community Association

Eastview is a mostly residential neighbourhood located in south-central Saskatoon, Saskatchewan, Canada. It is a suburban subdivision, consisting of low-density, single detached dwellings, low-rise apartment buildings and semi-detached houses. As of 2025, the area is home to 4,070 residents. The neighbourhood is considered a middle-income area, with a median personal income of $42,000, an average sale price of $291,267 and a home ownership rate of 68.0%.

== History ==
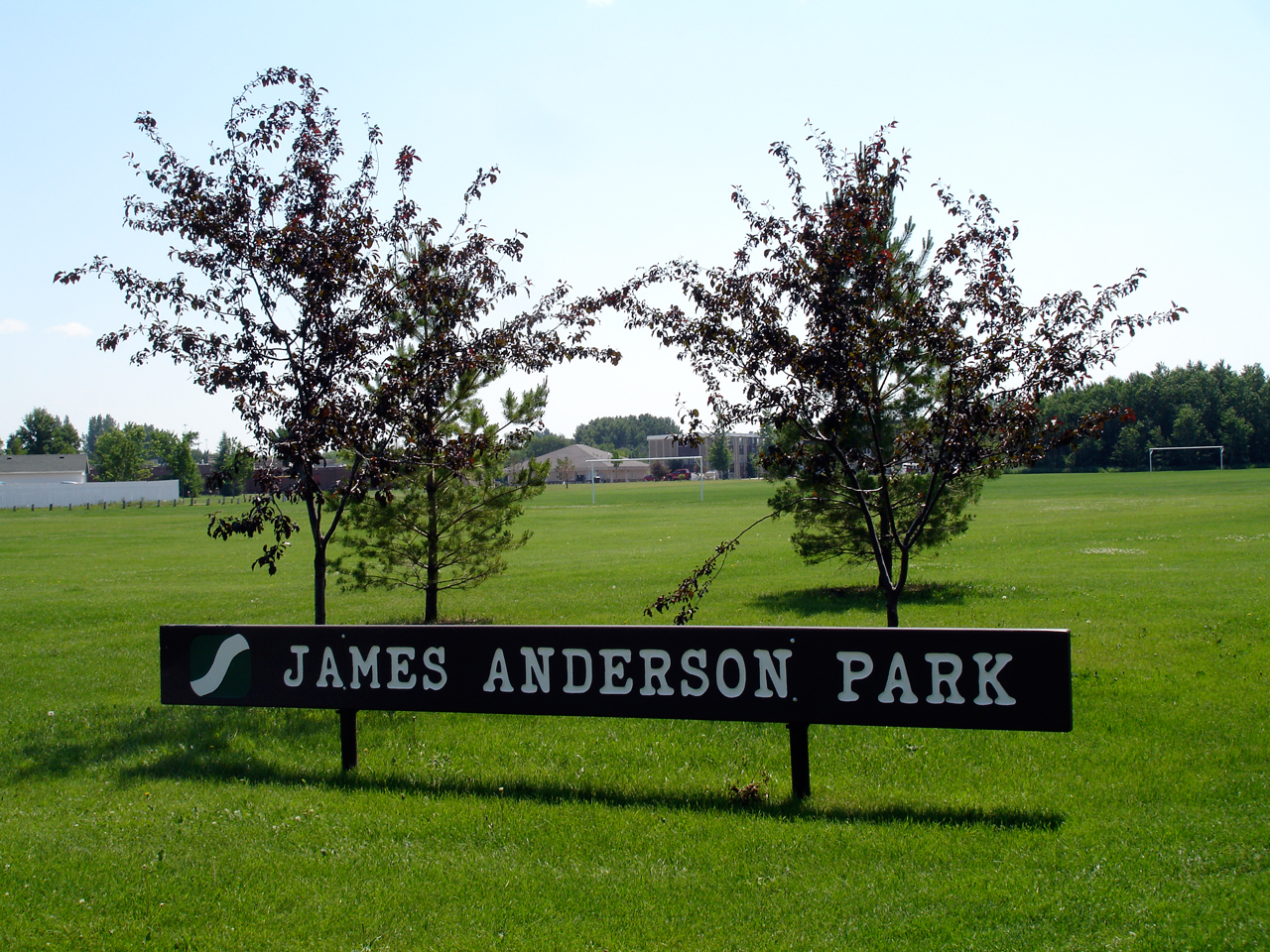
James Anderson Park

Most of the land for the Eastview neighbourhood was annexed by the city between 1950 and 1959, with the remaining southern piece annexed between 1960 and 1969. According to a 1913 map of registered subdivisions, Eastview's land was once identified as an acreage and a small, never-developed subdivision called "Megantic Park". Another proposed but undeveloped subdivision called "Preston Place" was in Eastview's southwest corner. Home building began in the area before 1946, but the vast majority of activity occurred between 1961 and 1970. Eastview is unique in that all the streets within it, aside from Arlington Avenue, share the common name of "East". When the streets were named in 1964, the neighbourhood was on the city's eastern edge, giving its residents a true "east view".

Alvin Buckwold School opened in 1966. Another public elementary school, John Dolan School, was opened in 1977. This school was founded in 1955 as a private school to help children with cognitive difficulties. It was first housed in North Park School; by 1967, it was incorporated into the public school system and moved to a facility on Kilburn Avenue. The school moved again in 1977 to the newly built facility in Eastview. In 2005, St. Thomas School absorbed the student population of St. James School in Nutana Park when the latter school closed. The school was renamed Pope John Paul II School.

== Government and politics ==
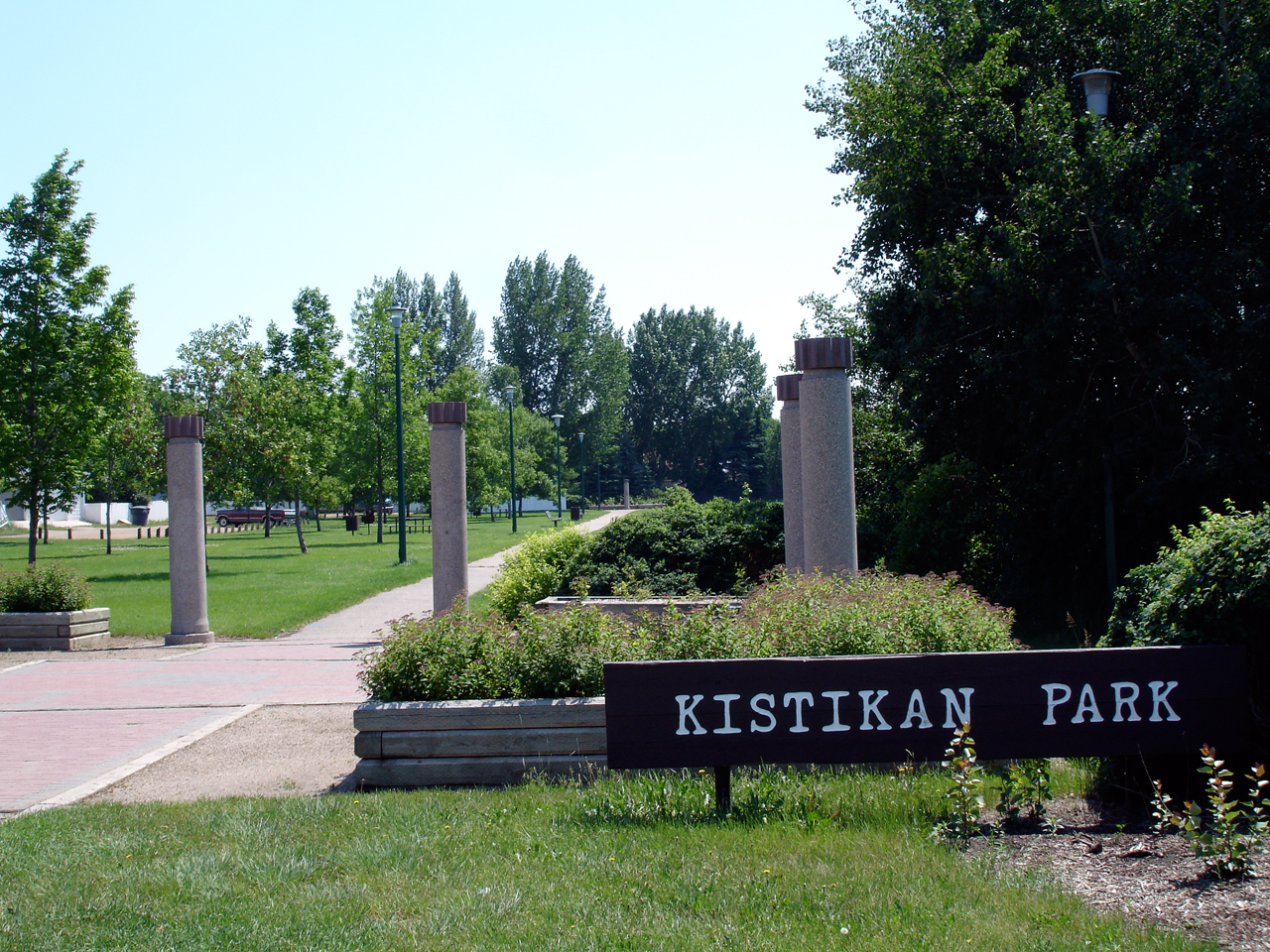
Kistikan Park

Eastview exists within the federal electoral district of Saskatoon—Grasswood. It is currently represented by Kevin Waugh of the Conservative Party of Canada, first elected in 2015.

Provincially, Eastview is within the constituency of Saskatoon Eastview. It is currently represented by Matt Love of the New Democratic Party, first elected in 2020.

In Saskatoon's non-partisan municipal politics, Eastview lies within ward 9. It is currently represented by Councillor Bev Dubois, who was first elected to city council in 2016.

== Institutions ==
=== Education ===
École Alvin Buckwold School
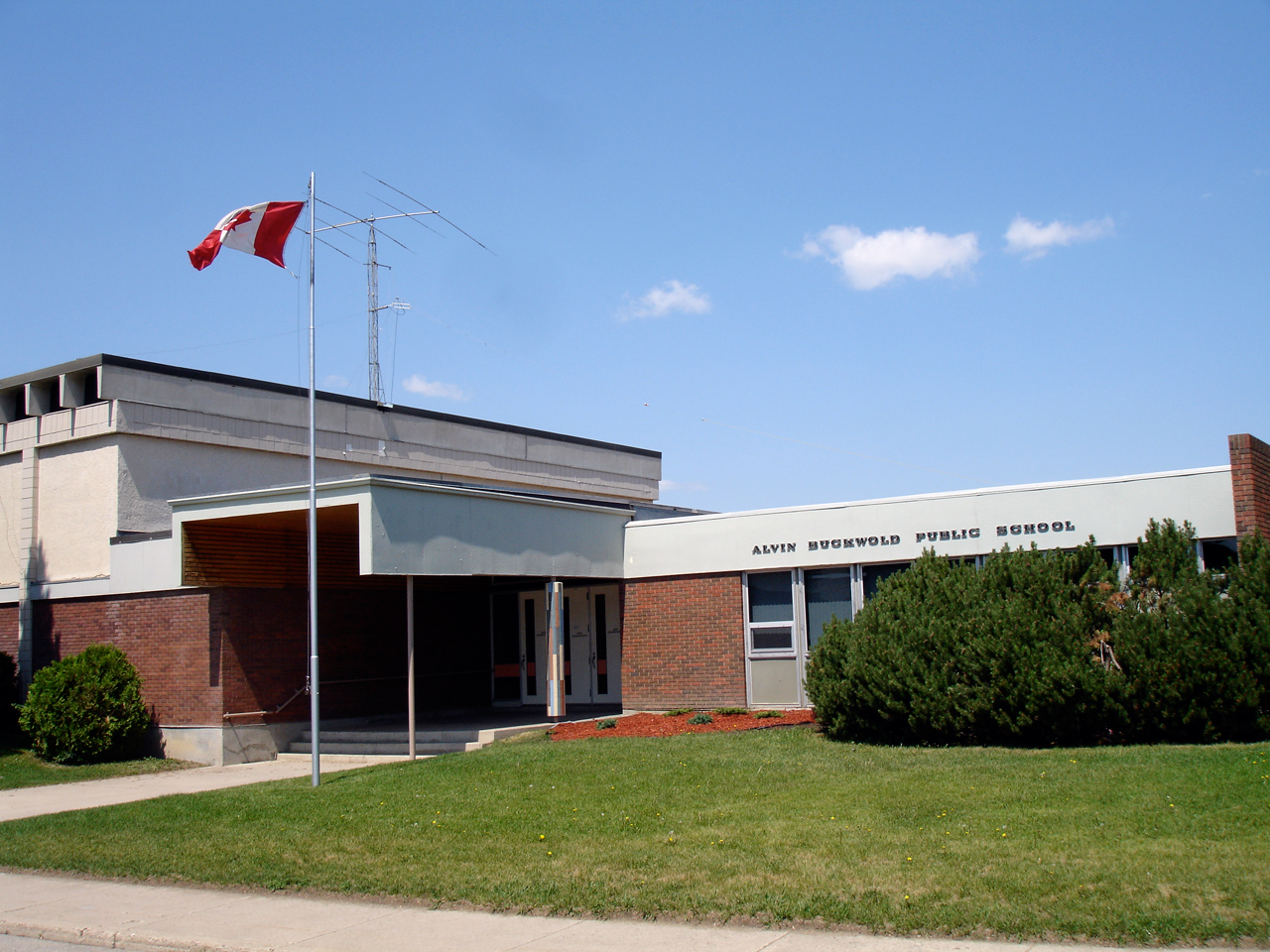
- 715 East Drive; Saskatoon, Saskatchewan, S7J 2X8; Canada

Information
- Type: Elementary
- Opened: 1966
- School board: Saskatoon Public School Division
- Principal: Matthew Bodnarchuk
- Grades: Kindergarten to Grade 8
- Enrollment: 463 (2025)
- Education system: Public
- Language: English, French
- Feeder to: Walter Murray Collegiate
- Website: École Alvin Buckwold School

John Dolan School
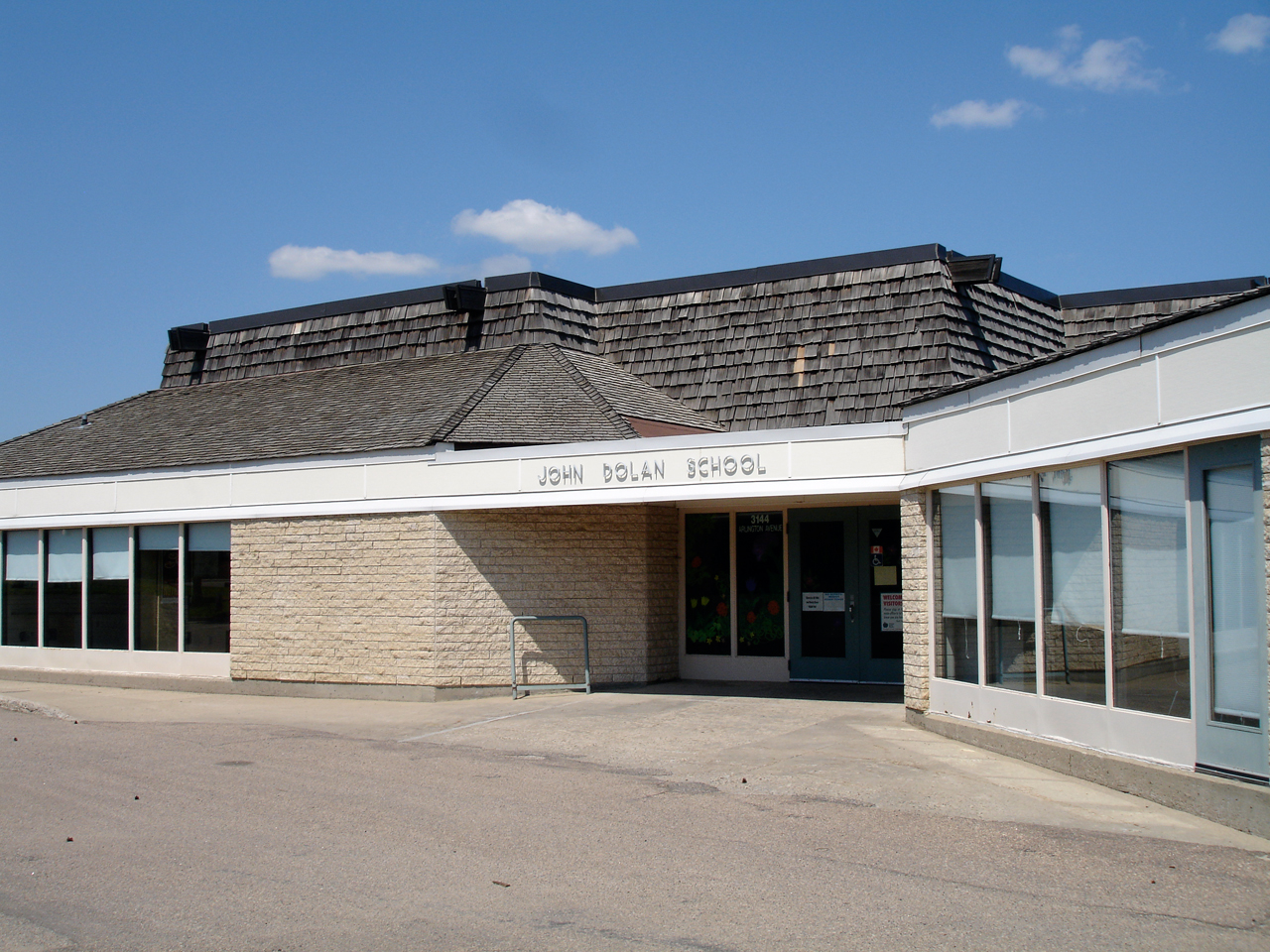
- 3144 Arlington Avenue; Saskatoon, Saskatchewan, S7J 3L5; Canada

Information
- Type: Elementary
- Established: 1955
- School board: Saskatoon Public School Division
- Principal: Darlene Schultz
- Grades: Kindergarten to Grade 12
- Enrollment: 63 (2025)
- Education system: Public, Special education
- Language: English
- Website: John Dolan School

Pope John Paul II School
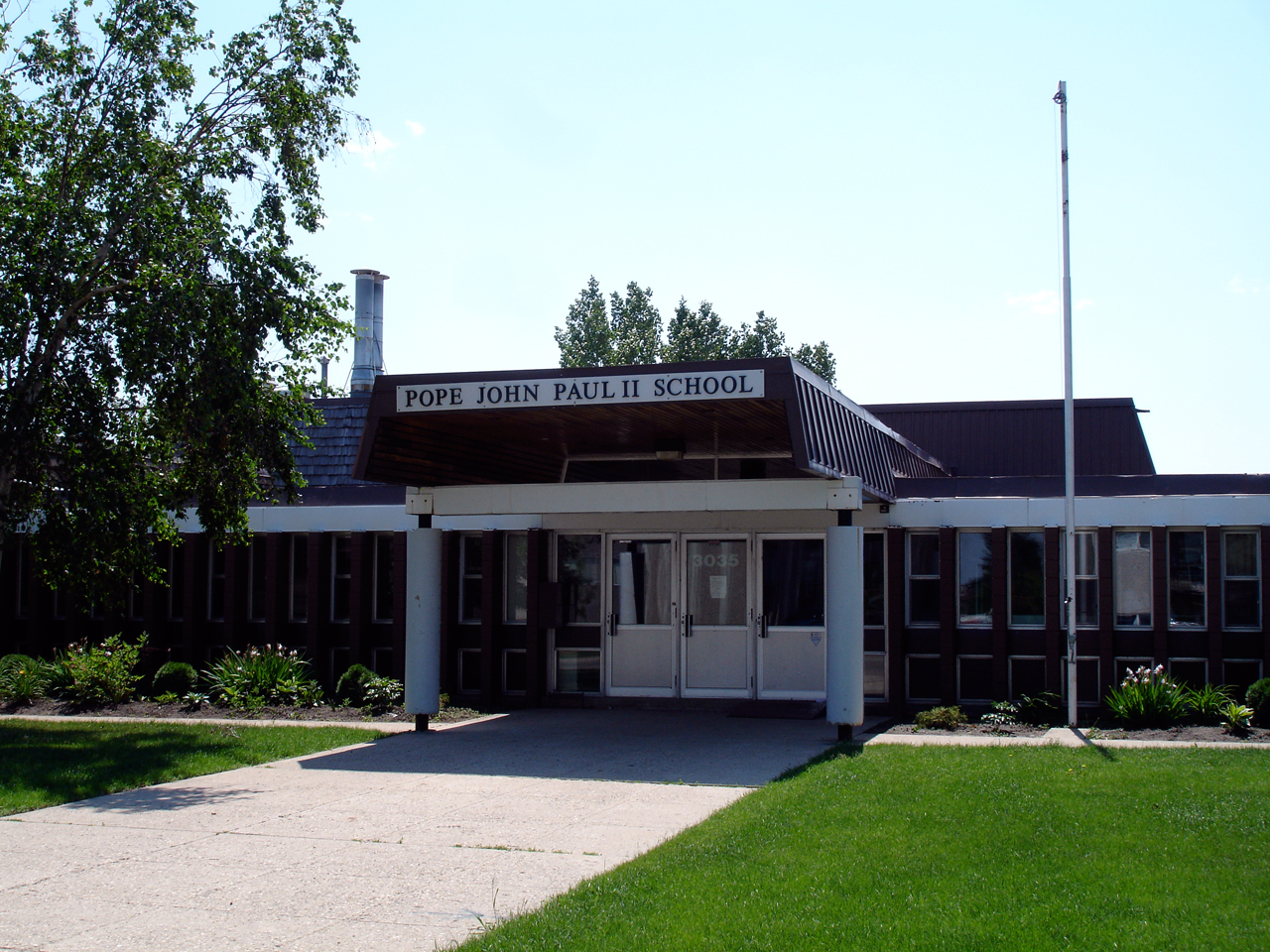
- 3035 Arlington Avenue; Saskatoon, Saskatchewan, S7J 3K5; Canada

Information
- Type: Elementary
- Religious affiliation: Catholic
- Opened: 1967
- School board: Greater Saskatoon Catholic Schools
- Principal: Stacia Horbay Ugalde
- Grades: Kindergarten to Grade 8
- Enrollment: 185 (2025)
- Education system: Separate
- Language: English
- Feeder to: Holy Cross High School
- Website: Pope John Paul II School

- École Alvin Buckwold School - public elementary school, part of the Saskatoon Public School Division.
- John Dolan School - public special education school, part of the Saskatoon Public School Division.
- Pope John Paul II School - separate (Catholic) elementary school, part of Greater Saskatoon Catholic Schools.

=== Public safety ===
- Saskatoon Fire and Protective Services - east division
- Saskatoon Police Service - east division

== Parks and recreation ==
- A.S. Wright Park - 8.5 acres (0.034 km^{2})
- James Anderson Park - 19.3 acres (0.078 km^{2})
- Kistakin Park - 16.2 acres (0.066 km^{2})

The Eastview Community Association operates indoor and outdoor programs out of Alvin Buckwold, and Pope John Paul II Schools, maintains the community rink and coordinates sports programs for children/youth.

== Commercial ==
Commercial development is limited to the Eastview Shopping Centre, a strip mall on Arlington Avenue. In addition, there are 70 home-based businesses in the neighbourhood. More extensive shopping amenities exist in the neighbouring Nutana Suburban Centre.

== Location ==
Eastview is located within the Nutana Suburban Development Area. It is bounded by Louise Street to the north, Circle Drive to the south and east, and Preston Avenue to the west. Roads are a mix of local and collector roads. An interchange at Preston Avenue South and Circle Drive, in the planning since the 1960's was completed in the fall of 2013.
