= Buena Vista, Saskatoon =

Buena Vista
- City of Saskatoon neighbourhood
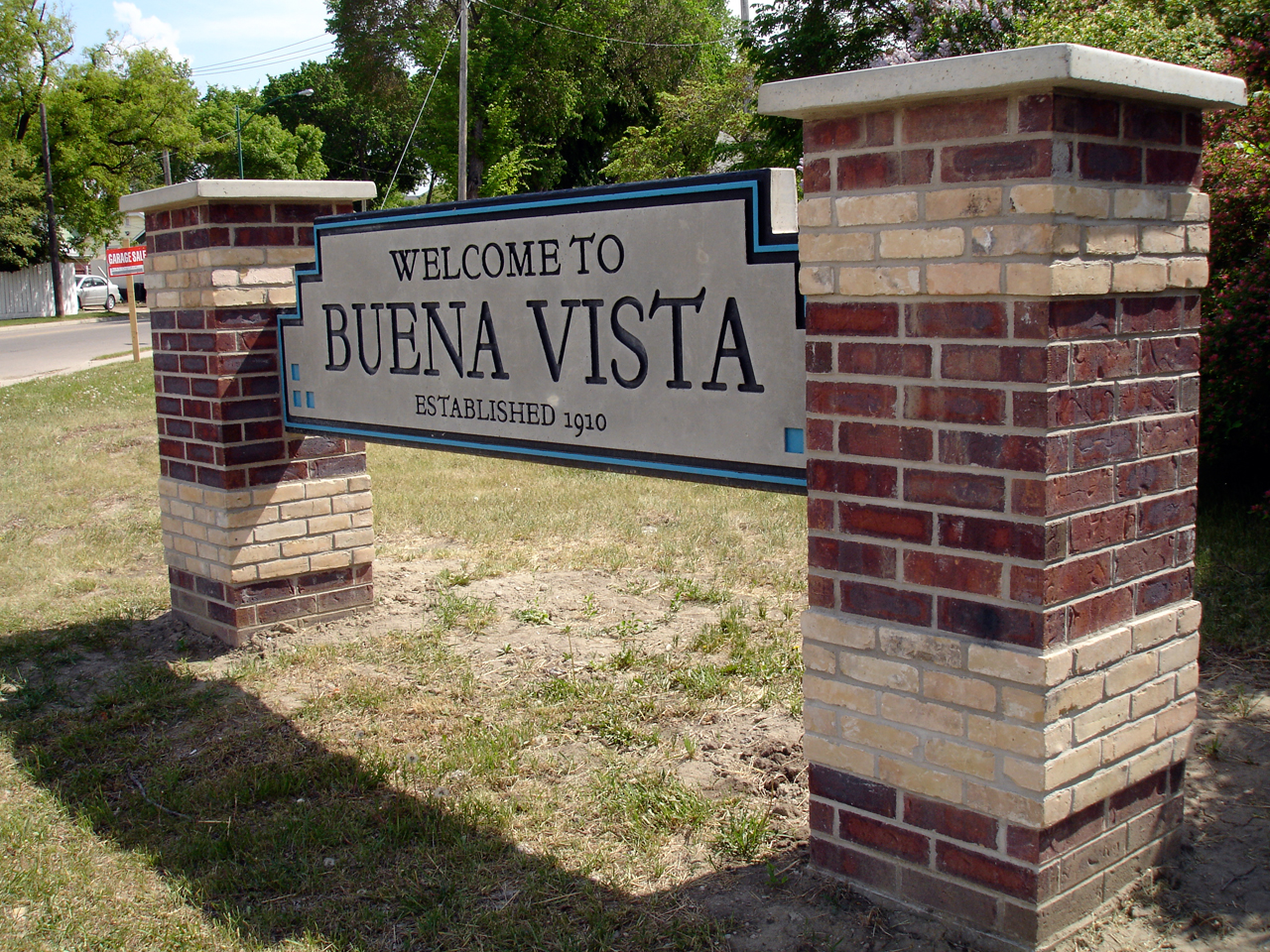
- Buena Vista entrance sign

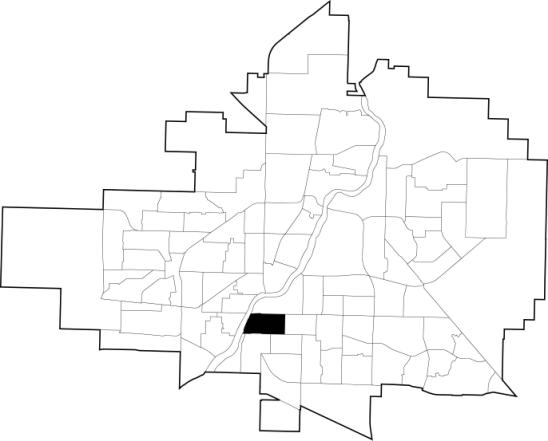
- Buena Vista location map
- Coordinates: 52°6′45″N 106°39′50″W
- Country: Canada
- Province: Saskatchewan
- City: Saskatoon
- Suburban Development Area: Nutana
- Neighbourhood: Buena Vista
- Settled: 1882
- Construction: 1910-1960

Government
  - Type: Municipal (Ward 6)
  - Administrative body: Saskatoon City Council
  - Councillor: Cynthia Block

Area
  - Total: 1.26 km^{2} (0.49 sq mi)

Population (2011)
  - Total: 3,271
  - Average Income: $67,170
- Time zone: UTC-6 (UTC)
- Website: www.bvcasaskatoon.ca

Buena Vista is a residential neighbourhood located near the centre of Saskatoon, Saskatchewan, Canada. It is an older suburban subdivision, including mostly low-density, single detached dwellings. As of 2011, the area is home to 3,271 residents. The neighbourhood is considered a middle-income area, with an average family income of $67,170, an average dwelling value of $251,560 and a home ownership rate of 77.7%.

== History ==
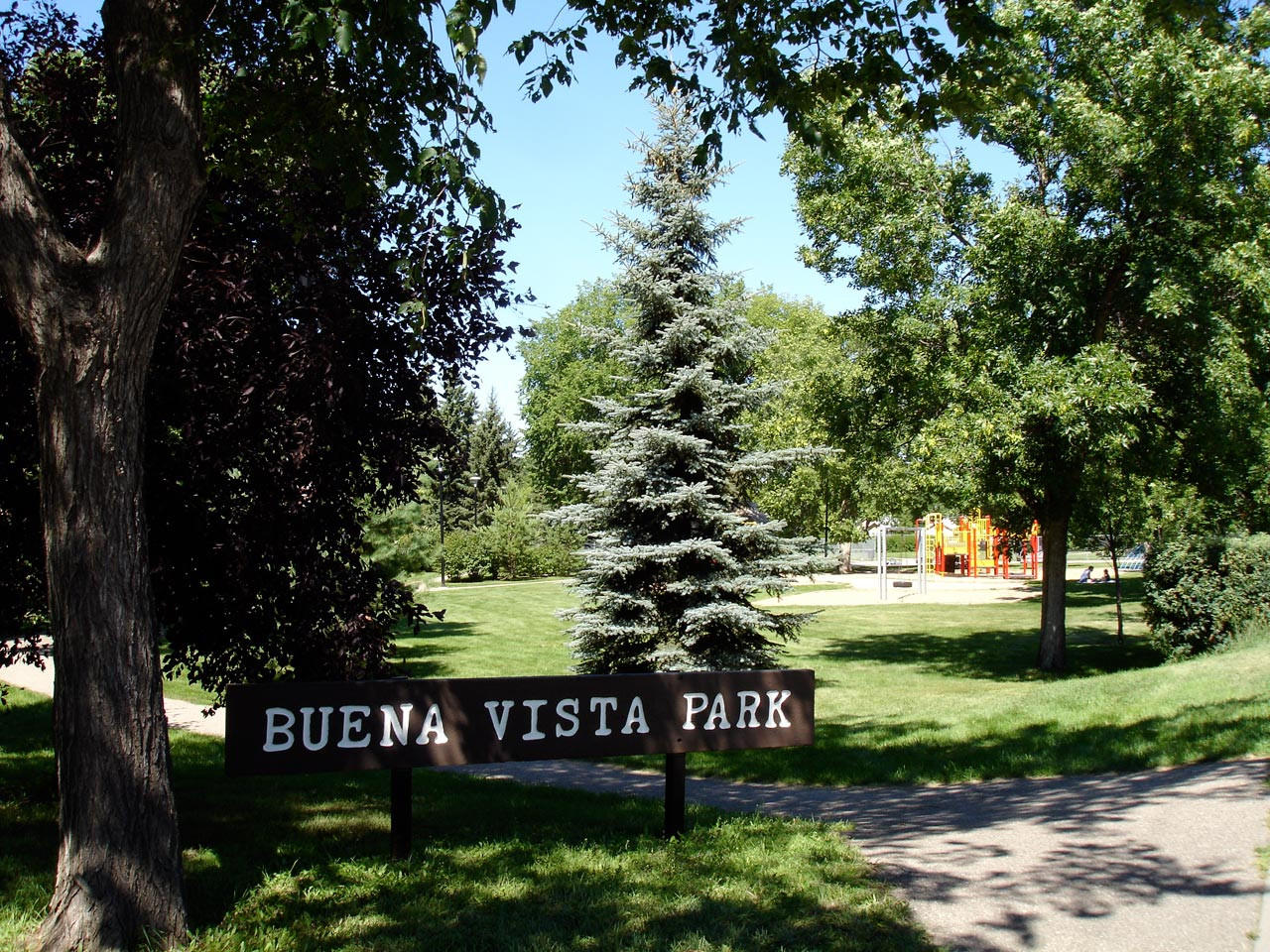
Buena Vista Park

The Buena Vista neighbourhood was within the city limits at the time of Saskatoon's incorporation in 1906, and was in fact on the original 1882 townsite plan (most of which today is designated as Nutana). The subdivision west of Lorne Avenue was marketed by three Saskatoon real estate men: W.H. Coy, A. MacDougall and F.E. Guppy. Two of the three eventually had streets named after them: Coy Avenue (located within Buena Vista itself) and Guppy Street (in Nutana Park; no street has been named for MacDougall due to there already being a street in Pacific Heights named for William McDougall, an early Canadian politician. In 1910 house lots in the area were being advertised for $275.

Buena Vista Park, developed in 1911-1912, was designed by U. Morell, a noted landscape architect from Minneapolis. According to a 1913 map of registered subdivisions, the riverbank portion of the current neighbourhood was originally named the Monroe Addition. The majority of residential construction was done before 1946, with a smaller amount up to 1960. After a few decades of very little construction, infill housing projects jumped starting after 1996.

An integral part of the neighbourhood is Buena Vista School, an elementary school in Saskatoon Public School Division. It was designed in the Collegiate Gothic style by Scottish architect David Webster, who had previously designed several similar-looking schools (King George, King Edward, Albert, Westmount, Caswell and Alexandra). The cornerstone was laid by school board secretary W.P. Bate on June 9, 1913 and the first rooms opened on April 1, 1914. Six more rooms opened in September of the same year.

== Government and politics ==
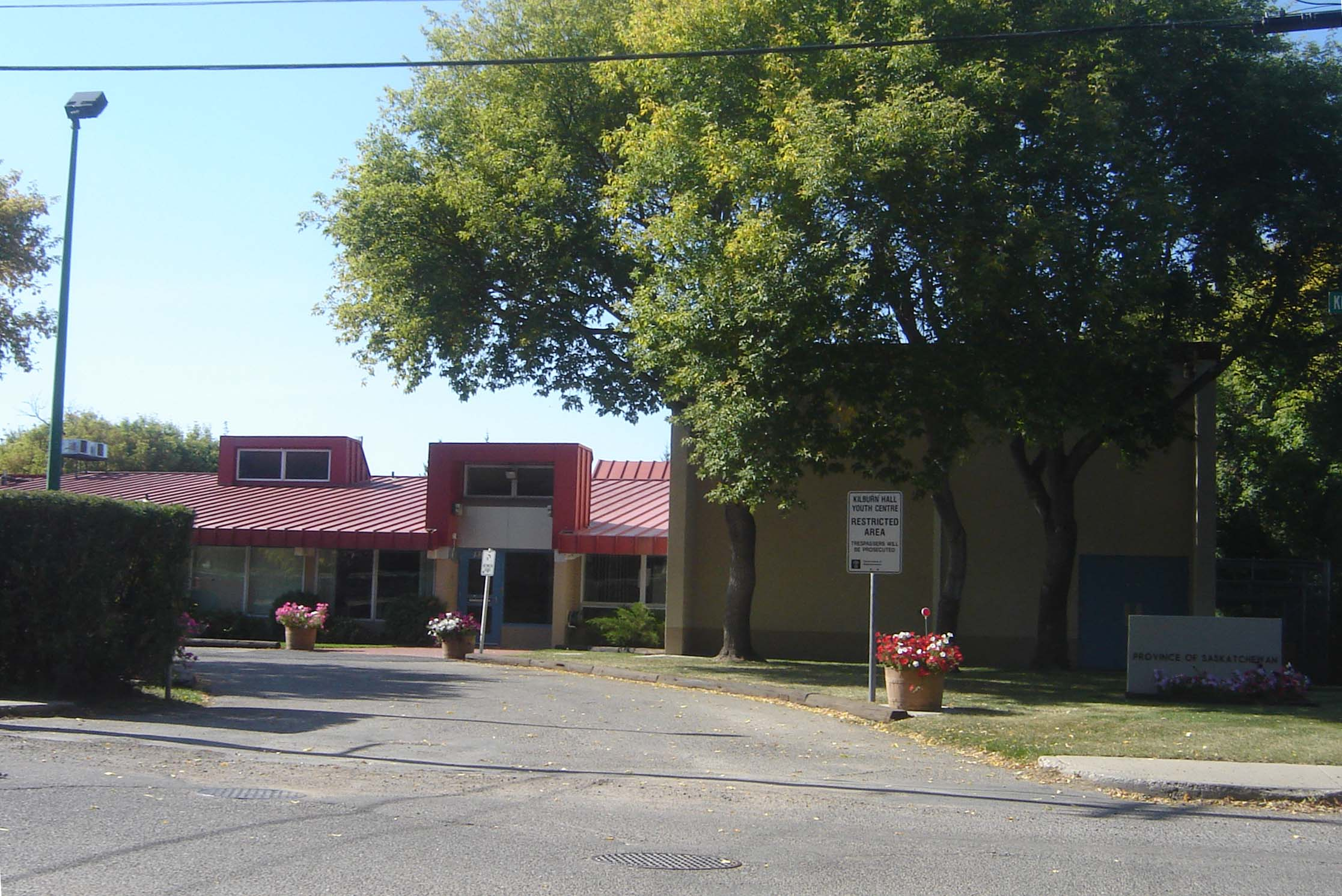
Kilburn Hall

Buena Vista exists within the federal electoral district of Saskatoon—Grasswood. It is currently represented by Kevin Waugh of the Conservative Party of Canada, first elected in 2015.

Provincially, the area is within the constituency of Saskatoon Nutana. It is currently represented by Erika Ritchie of the Saskatchewan New Democratic Party, first elected in 2020.

In Saskatoon's non-partisan municipal politics, Buena Vista lies within ward 6. It is currently represented by Councillor Jasmin Parker, first elected in 2024.

== Institutions ==
=== Education ===
Buena Vista School
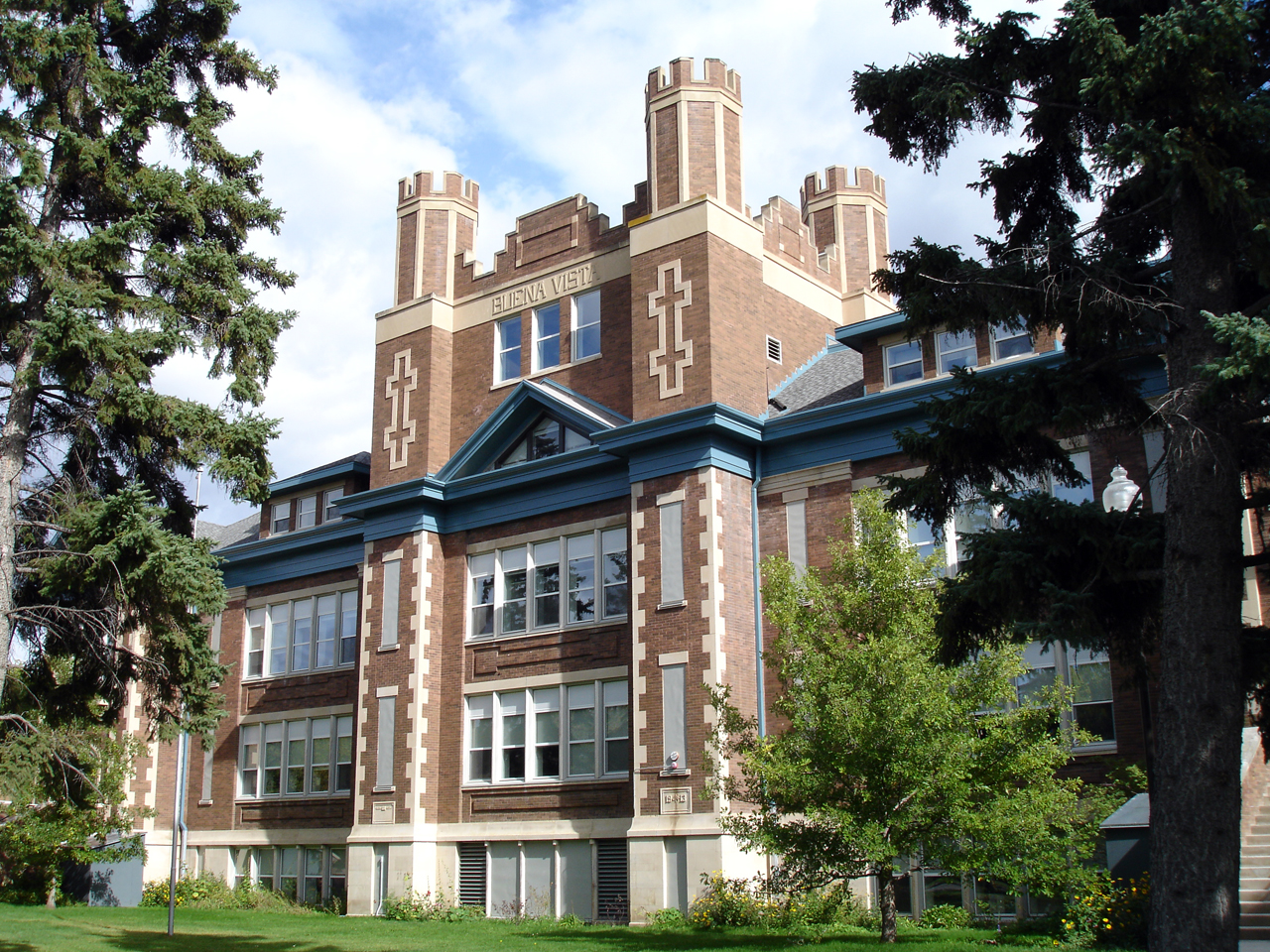
- 1306 Lorne Avenue; Saskatoon, Saskatchewan, S7H 1X8; Canada

Information
- Type: Elementary
- Motto: Tristis Locus
- Opened: 1914
- School board: Saskatoon Public Schools
- Principal: Justin Giesbrecht
- Grades: Kindergarten to Grade 8
- Enrollment: 254 (2017)
- Education system: Public
- Language: English
- Feeder to: Aden Bowman Collegiate
- Website: Buena Vista School

- Buena Vista School - public elementary, part of the Saskatoon Public School Division

=== Public safety ===
- Kilburn Hall - secure custody facility for young offenders

=== Other ===
- Saskatchewan Abilities Council - vocational, rehabilitation and recreational services for physically and mentally disabled persons

== Parks and recreation ==
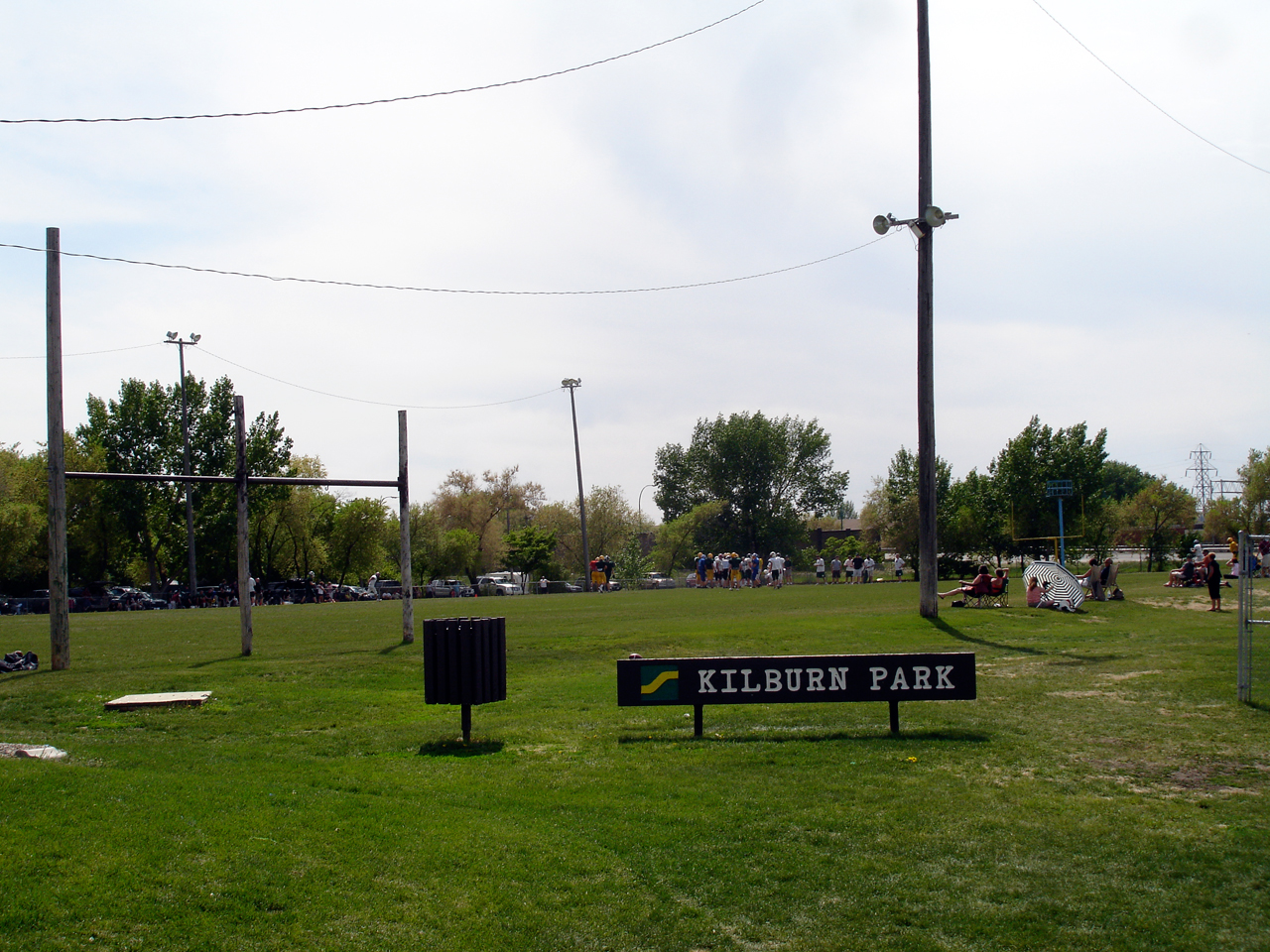
Kilburn Park

- Buena Vista Park (7.0 acres)
- Gabriel Dumont Park (8.6 acres)
- Kilburn Park (9.3 acres)

The Nutana Lawn Bowling Club operates out of a facility on the north side of Buena Vista Park.

Kilburn Park is the practice field for the Saskatoon Hilltops, a junior football team.

The Buena Vista Community Association has a close working relationship with Buena Vista School and is actively involved in maintaining the community outdoor rink and playground equipment on school grounds, even helping with school field trips. It coordinates community events, leisure programs for all ages and sports programs for children/youth.

== Commercial ==
Commercial development is limited to a few lots at the intersection of Lorne Avenue and Taylor Street, a few businesses at Broadway Avenue and Taylor Street, a neighbourhood café at Lorne Avenue and 2nd Street, and the Rawlco Radio building on the riverbank near Gabriel Dumont Park. 66 home-based businesses exist in the area.

== Location ==
Buena Vista is located within the Nutana Suburban Development Area. It is bounded by 8th Street to the north, Taylor Street to the south, Broadway Avenue to the east, and the South Saskatchewan River to the west. Roads are laid out in a grid fashion; streets run east-west, avenues run north-south.
