= Haultain, Saskatoon =

Haultain
- Neighbourhood
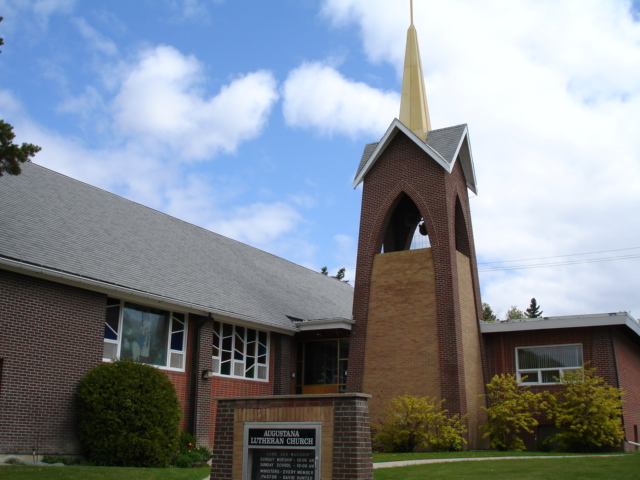
- Augustana Lutheran Church

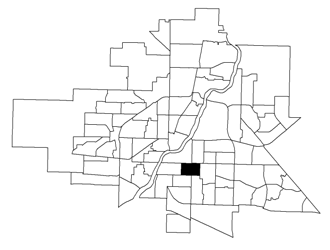
- Haultain location map
- Coordinates: 52°6′13″N 106°39′20″W
- Country: Canada
- Province: Saskatchewan
- City: Saskatoon
- Suburban Development Area: Nutana
- Neighbourhood: Haultain
- Annexed: 1910-1919
- Construction: 1946-1960

Government
  - Type: Municipal (Ward 6)
  - Administrative body: Saskatoon City Council
  - Councillor: Cynthia Block

Area
  - Total: 1.04 km^{2} (0.40 sq mi)

Population (2007)
  - Total: 2,742
  - Average Income: $52,355
- Time zone: UTC-6 (UTC)
- Website: Queen Elizabeth Community Association; Holliston Community Association

Haultain is a mostly residential neighbourhood located in south-central Saskatoon, Saskatchewan, Canada. It is a suburban subdivision, consisting mostly of low-density, single detached dwellings. As of 2007, the area is home to 2,742 residents. The neighbourhood is considered a middle-income area, with an average family income of $47,890, an average dwelling value of $201,503 and a home ownership rate of 59.3%.

== History ==
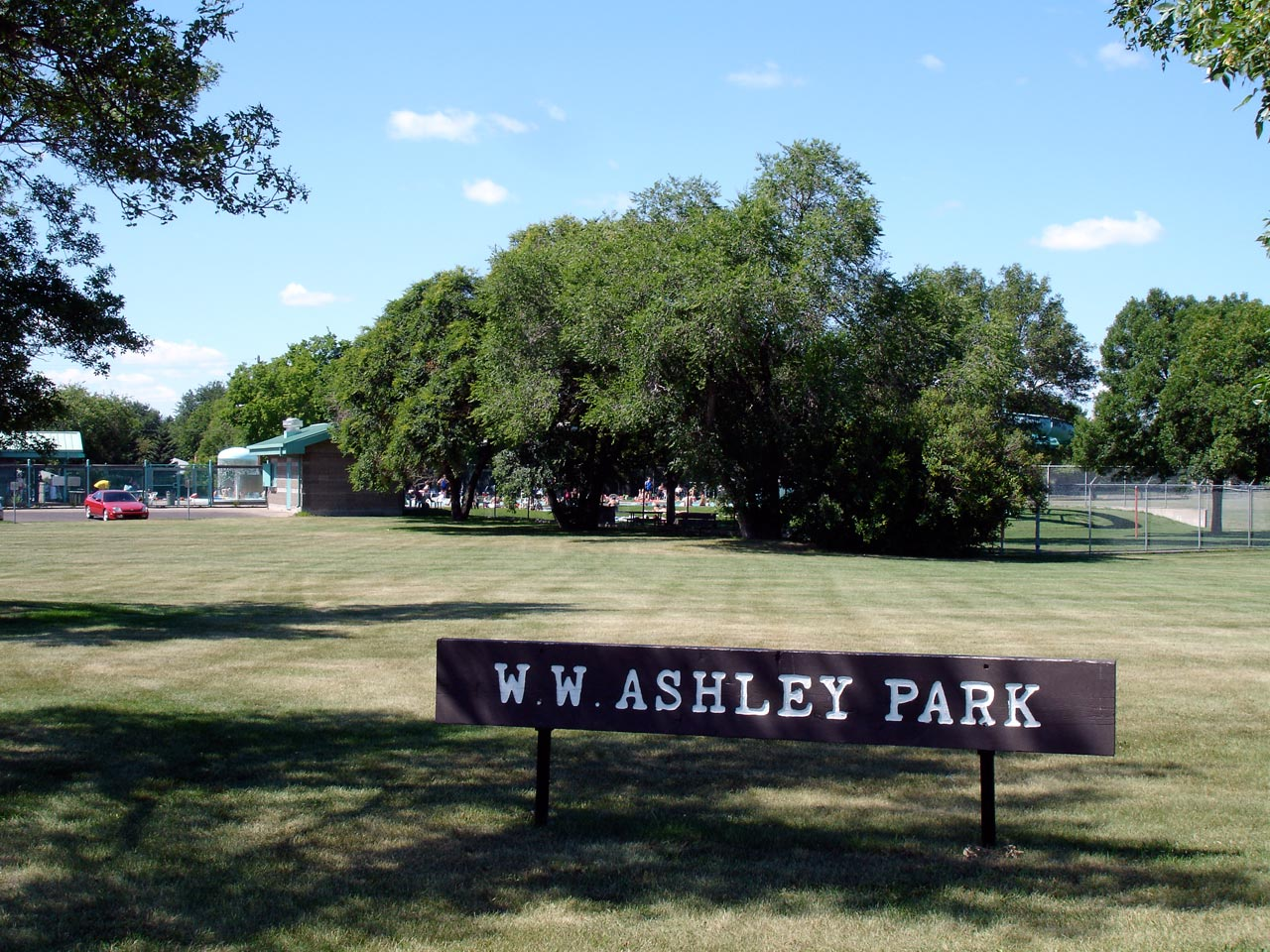
W.W. Ashley Park

The west half of Haultain was within the city limits when it incorporated; the land east of Clarence Avenue was annexed by the city between 1910 and 1919. A 1913 map shows that the present-day Haultain area overlaps two registered subdivisions of the day: the Broadway Addition in the west and Victoria Park in the east.

Haultain School was opened in 1924, and named in honour of Sir Frederick Haultain, former Commissioner of Education and later first Premier of the Northwest Territories. The school's first principal was Miss Victoria Miners. In 1936, she received a Master of Education, making her the first woman in Saskatoon and only the second woman in Canada to earn that degree.

When the school was first constructed, it was on the outskirts of Saskatoon. Many homes had no running water - it was delivered by water truck and residents could purchase pails of water. The school provided Monday morning baths in the school basement, and several homes still had outhouses until plumbing was established. Street railway bus service to Haultain commenced on March 19, 1932.

Home construction peaked between 1946 and 1960. Haultain School was renovated in the 1950s, during a period of rapid school planning and building. Lathey Pool officially opened on July 6, 1955. The J.S. Wood branch library opened next to the pool in 1961, and was named in honour of James Stuart Wood, a former chief librarian. Haultain School closed by the 1990s, and was purchased by the francophone school board. It became L'École canadienne-française in 1995 and offered classes from kindergarten to Grade 12. In 2006, Grade 8 to 12 students moved to a new facility, Pavillon Gustave Dubois, in the Nutana Park neighbourhood.

== Government and politics ==
Haultain exists within the federal electoral district of Saskatoon—Grasswood. It is currently represented by Kevin Waugh of the Conservative Party of Canada, first elected in 2015.

Provincially, the area is divided by McKinnon Avenue into the constituencies of Saskatoon Churchill-Wildwood and Saskatoon Nutana. Saskatoon Churchill-Wildwood is currently represented by Lisa Lambert of the Saskatchewan Party since 2016. Saskatoon Nutana is currently represented by Cathy Sproule of the Saskatchewan New Democratic Party since 2011.

In Saskatoon's non-partisan municipal politics, Haultain lies within ward 6. It is represented by Councillor Cynthia Block, first elected in 2016.

== Institutions ==
=== Education ===
L'École canadienne-française
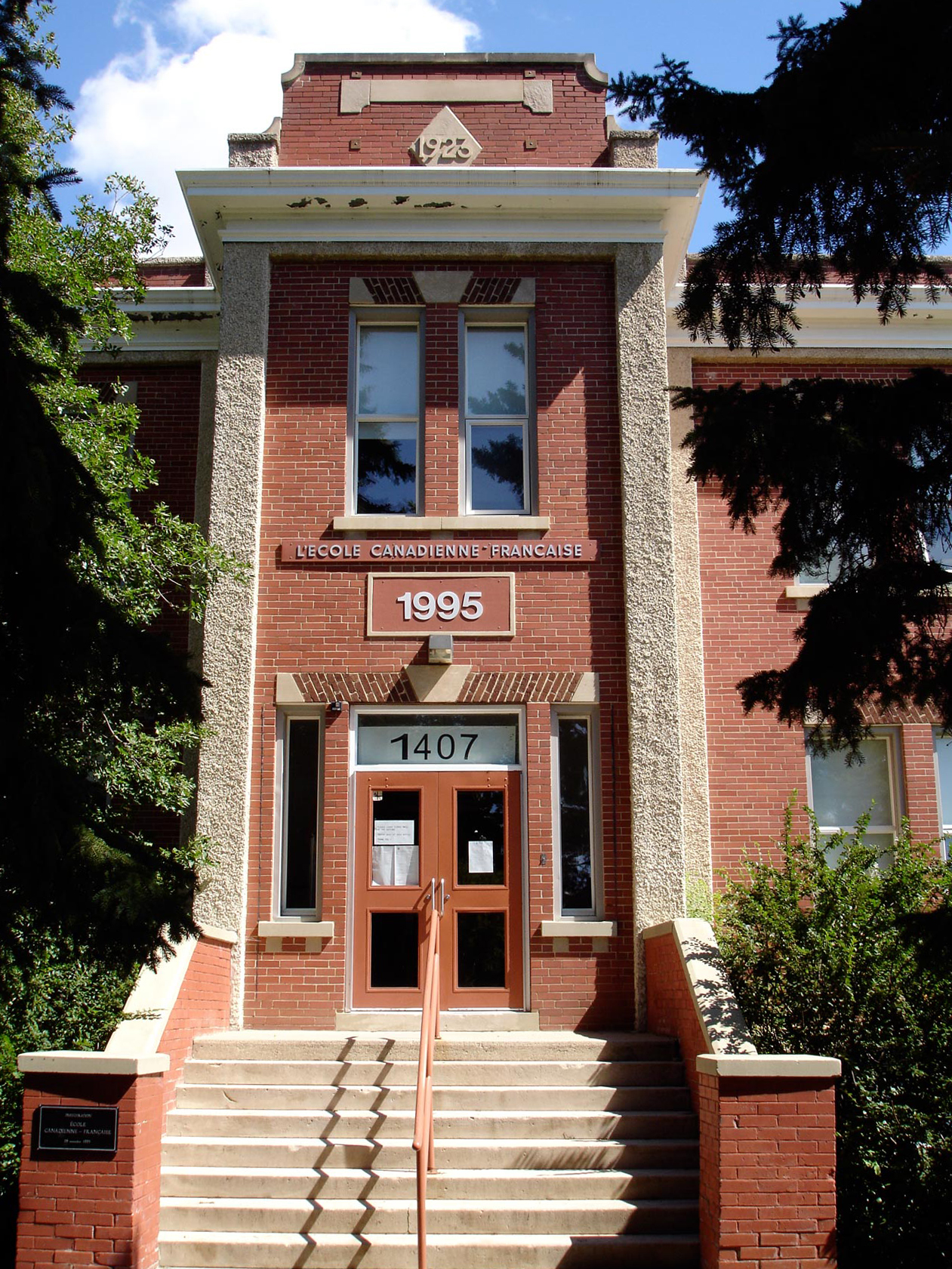
- L'École canadienne-française

Location
- 1407 Albert Avenue; Saskatoon, Canada, Saskatchewan, S7H 5R8

Information
- School type: Elementary
- Opened: 1924 (Haultain School); 1995 (L'École canadienne-française)
- School board: Conseil des écoles fransaskoises
- Grades: Kindergarten to Grade 7
- Education system: Francophone
- Website: L'École canadienne-française

- L'École canadienne-française - francophone elementary school, part of the Conseil des écoles fransaskoises (Fransaskois School Division).
- J.S. Wood Branch Library - branch of the Saskatoon Public Library, opened in 1961.

== Parks and recreation ==
- W.W. Ashley Park - 6.9 acres (2.8 ha)

W.W. Ashely Park was named after Wyndham Winkler Ashley, a charter member of the Saskatoon Parks Board in 1912. He is credited with the planting of spruce trees in President Murray Park in the Varsity View neighbourhood, and American elms along Saskatchewan Crescent.

Lathey Pool is a public swimming pool that operates during the summer months.

Haultain does not have its own community association, but each half is served by one of its neighbouring community association. The Queen Elizabeth Community Association serves west Haultain residents by offering recreational, social, and educational programs for adults, children/youth, and preschoolers. The Holliston Community Association serves the east part of Haultain. It operates programs including sports for children/youth and fitness, recreation and leisure for all ages.

== Public services ==
Haultain is a part of the east division of the Saskatoon Police Service's patrol system. Saskatoon Fire & Protective Services' east division covers the neighbourhood. Transit services to Haultain are provided by Saskatoon Transit on routes No. 6 (Clarence - Broadway) and 13 (Lawson - Exhibition).

== Commercial ==
The northern border of Haultain includes part of the 8th Street business district. There are also businesses located along Broadway Avenue at Taylor Street. In addition, there are 45 home-based businesses in the neighbourhood.

== Location ==
Haultain is located within the Nutana Suburban Development Area. It is bounded by 8th Street to the north, Taylor Street to the south, Broadway Avenue to the west, and Munroe Avenue to the east. Roads are laid out in a grid fashion; streets run east-west, avenues run north-south.
