= Holy Cross High School (Saskatoon) =

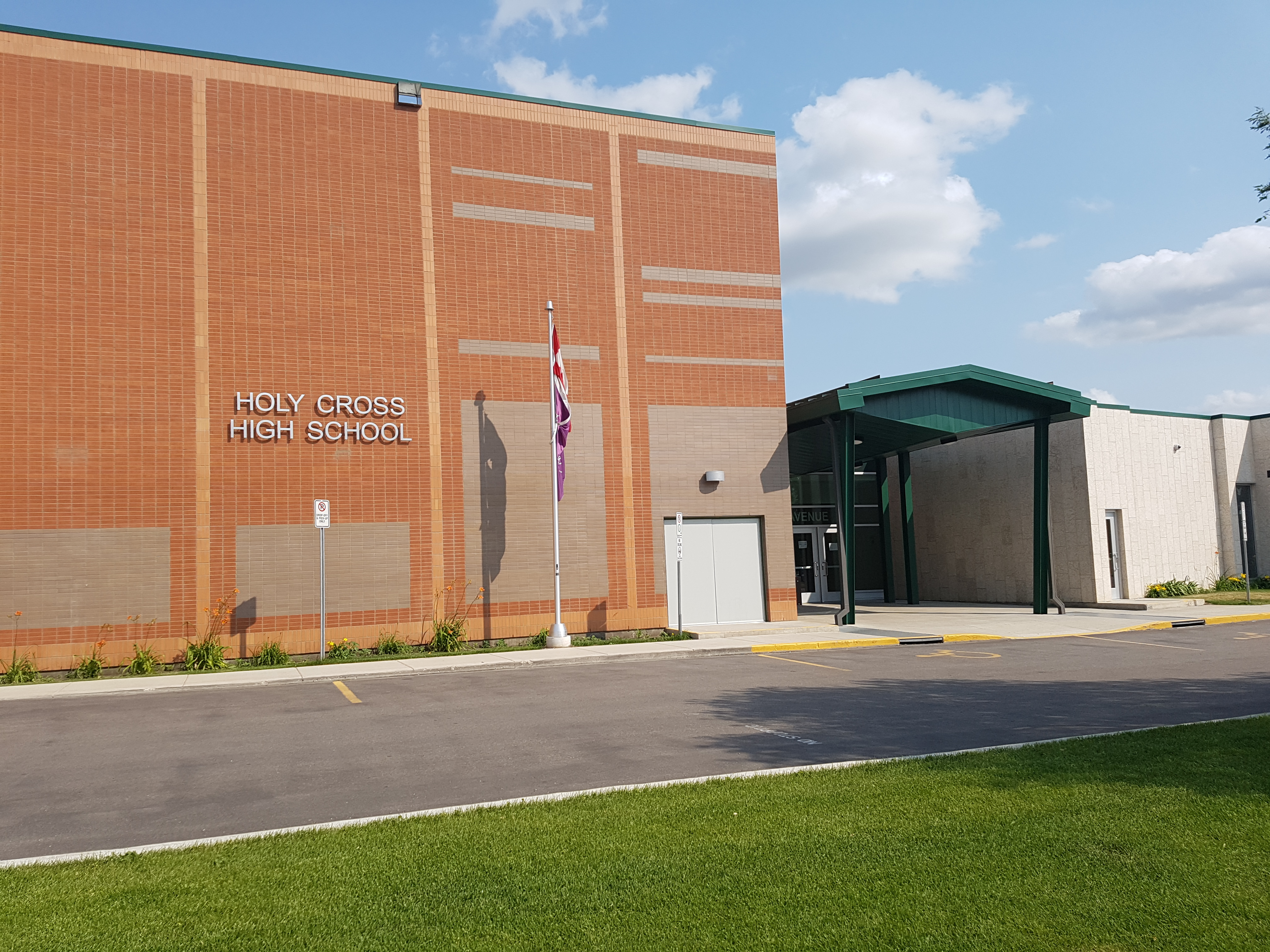

Location
- 2115 McEown Avenue; Saskatoon, Saskatchewan, S7J 3K8; Canada; 52.104819°N 106.615592°W

Information
- Type: Secondary
- Motto: In Hoc Signo (By This Sign)
- Religious affiliation: Catholic
- Opened: 1963
- School board: Greater Saskatoon Catholic Schools
- Principal: Krista Hayes
- Grades: Grade 9 to Grade 12
- Enrollment: 1,811 (2025)
- Education system: Separate
- Language: English, French Immersion
- Colours: Green and white
- Team name: Crusaders
- Website: Holy Cross High School

Holy Cross High School is a high school serving grades 9 to 12, located in south-eastern Saskatoon, Saskatchewan. It is part of Greater Saskatoon Catholic Schools.

Currently its feeder schools are Bishop Pocock School, Georges Vanier Catholic Fine Arts School, Pope John Paul II School, St. Bernard School, St. Frances School, St. Luke School, École St. Matthew School St. Philip School and Ecole Cardinal Leger School

== Sports ==
| Sport | Grade | Season |
|---|---|---|
| Junior and senior football | 9-12 | Aug-Nov |
| Frosh, junior and senior volleyball | 9-12 | Sept-Nov |
| Frosh, junior and senior basketball | 9-12 | Nov-March |
| Junior and senior badminton | 10-12 | March–May |
| Senior soccer | 9-12 | Aug-Nov |
| Cross Country Running | 9-12 | Aug-Oct |
| Wrestling | 9-12 | Dec-March |
| Track | 9-12 | March–May |
| Girls' and boys' curling | 9-12 | Oct-Mar |

== Notable alumni ==
- Jeff Adamson – co-founder of food delivery app, SkipTheDishes.com
- Mike Babcock – former NHL head coach, Two-time Men's Olympic ice hockey head coach, former head coach for University of Saskatchewan Huskies men's hockey
- Dan Farthing – Saskatchewan Roughriders 1991–2007
- Darcy Kuemper – NHL goaltender for the Colorado Avalanche
- Catriona Le May Doan – Olympic gold medalist in speed skating
- Curtis Leschyshyn – former NHL defenceman

Don Schmid - drummer for The Northern Pikes [pop/rock band]

- Earl Pereira – singer and musician of Wide Mouth Mason
- Theresa Sokyrka – singer and musician

The school contains a Wall of Honour which showcases many distinguished alumni.
