= Brevoort Park, Saskatoon =

Brevoort Park
- City of Saskatoon neighbourhood
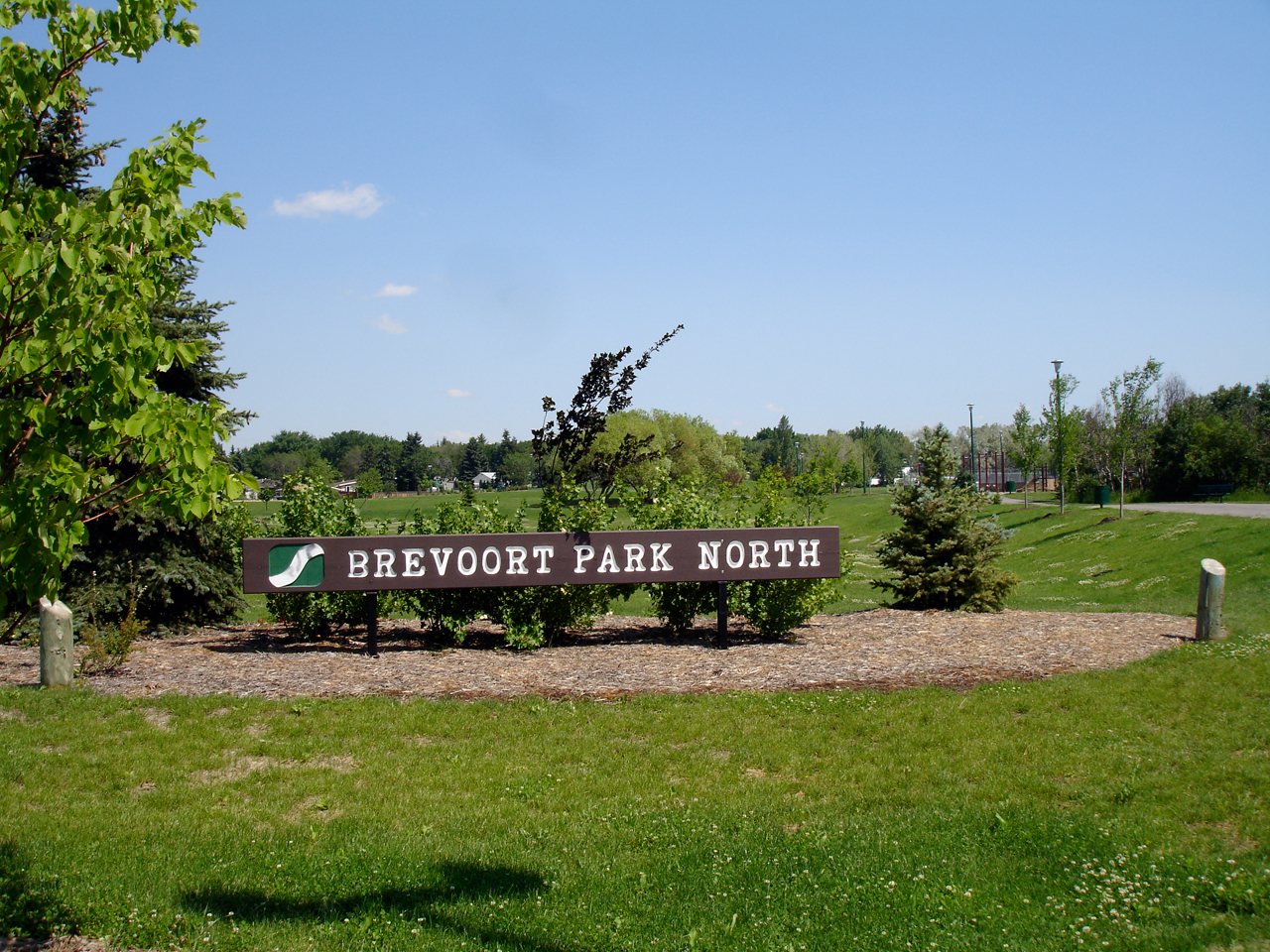
- Brevoort Park North

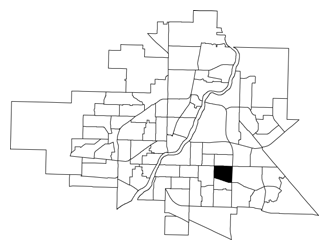
- Brevoort Park location map
- Coordinates: 52°6′36″N 106°36′35″W
- Country: Canada
- Province: Saskatchewan
- City: Saskatoon
- Suburban Development Area: Nutana
- Neighbourhood: Brevoort Park
- Continent: North America
- Annexed: 1955-1959
- Construction: 1961-1970

Government
  - Type: Municipal (Ward 6)
  - Administrative body: Saskatoon City Council
  - Councillor: Sarina Gersher

Area
  - Total: 1.22 km^{2} (0.47 sq mi)

Population (2007)
  - Total: 3,424
  - Average Income: $52,098
- Time zone: UTC-6 (UTC)
- Website: Brevoort Park Community Association

Brevoort Park is a primarily residential neighbourhood located in the southeast part of Saskatoon, Saskatchewan, Canada. It includes part of the 8th Street business district. Just over half of its dwellings are single detached houses, with a sizeable minority of duplex or apartment-style multiple unit dwellings. As of 2007, the area is home to 3,424 residents. The neighbourhood is considered a middle-income area, with an average family income of $52,098, and a home ownership rate of 54.0%.

== History ==
The land where Brevoort Park now exists was annexed in the period between 1955 and 1959, and home construction was at its peak from 1961 until 1970. Brevoort Park School was built starting in 1963 and opened in 1964.

== Government and politics ==
Brevoort Park exists within the federal electoral district of Saskatoon—Grasswood. It is currently represented by Kevin Waugh of the Conservative Party of Canada, first elected in 2015.

Provincially, the area is within the constituency of Saskatoon Churchill-Wildwood. It is currently represented by Lisa Lambert of the Saskatchewan Party, first elected in 2016.

In Saskatoon's non-partisan municipal politics, Brevoort Park lies within ward 6. It is currently represented by Councillor Cynthia Block, whose term expires in 2024.

== Institutions ==
=== Education ===
Brevoort Park School
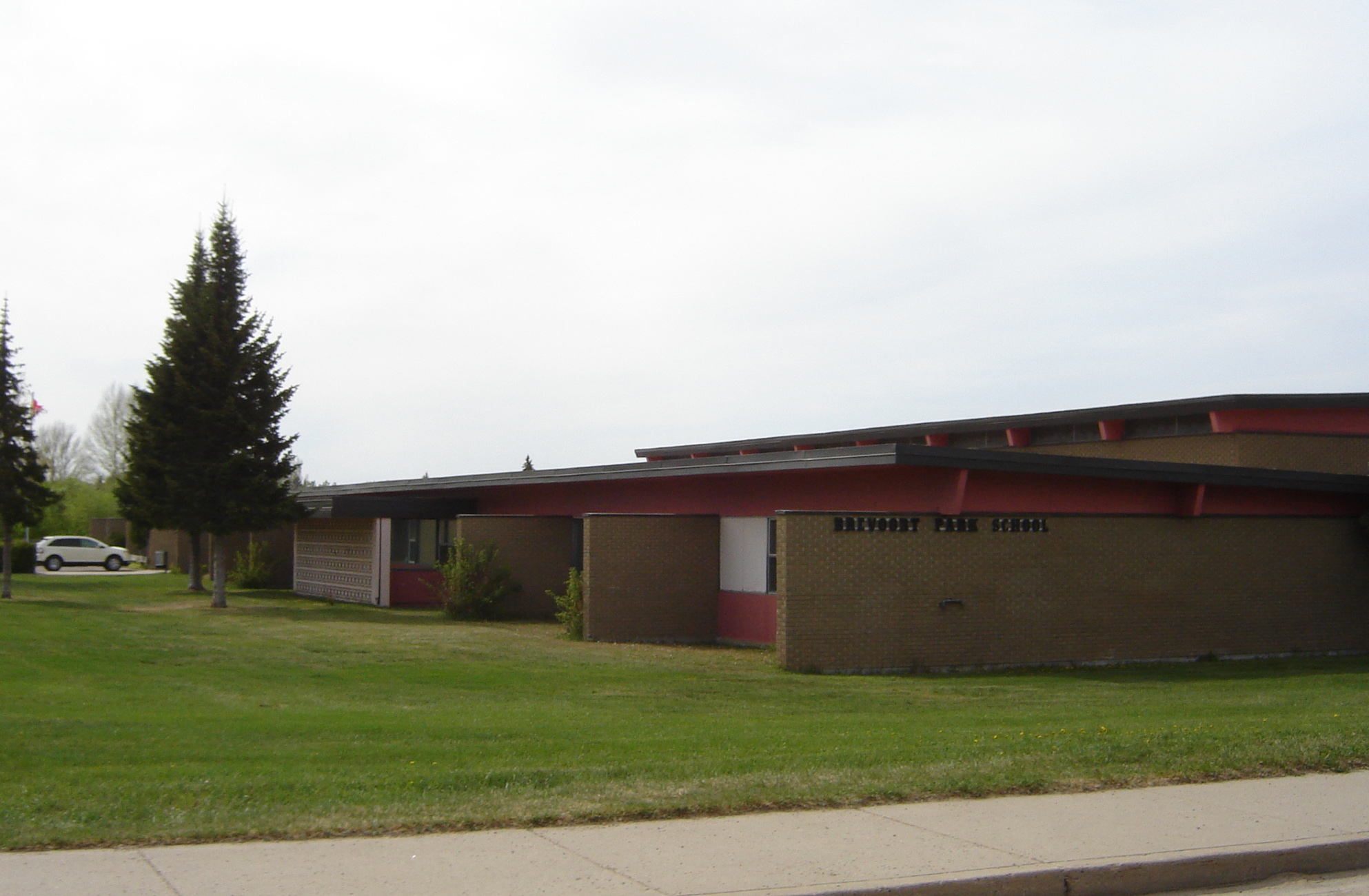

Location
- 2809 Early Drive; Saskatoon, Saskatchewan, S7H 3K4; Canada

Information
- Type: Elementary
- School board: Saskatoon Public School Division
- Principal: Chantelle Balicki
- Grades: Kindergarten to Grade 8
- Enrollment: 237 (2017)
- Education system: Public
- Language: English
- Mascot: Bobcat
- Feeder to: Walter Murray Collegiate
- Website: Brevoort Park School

École St. Matthew School
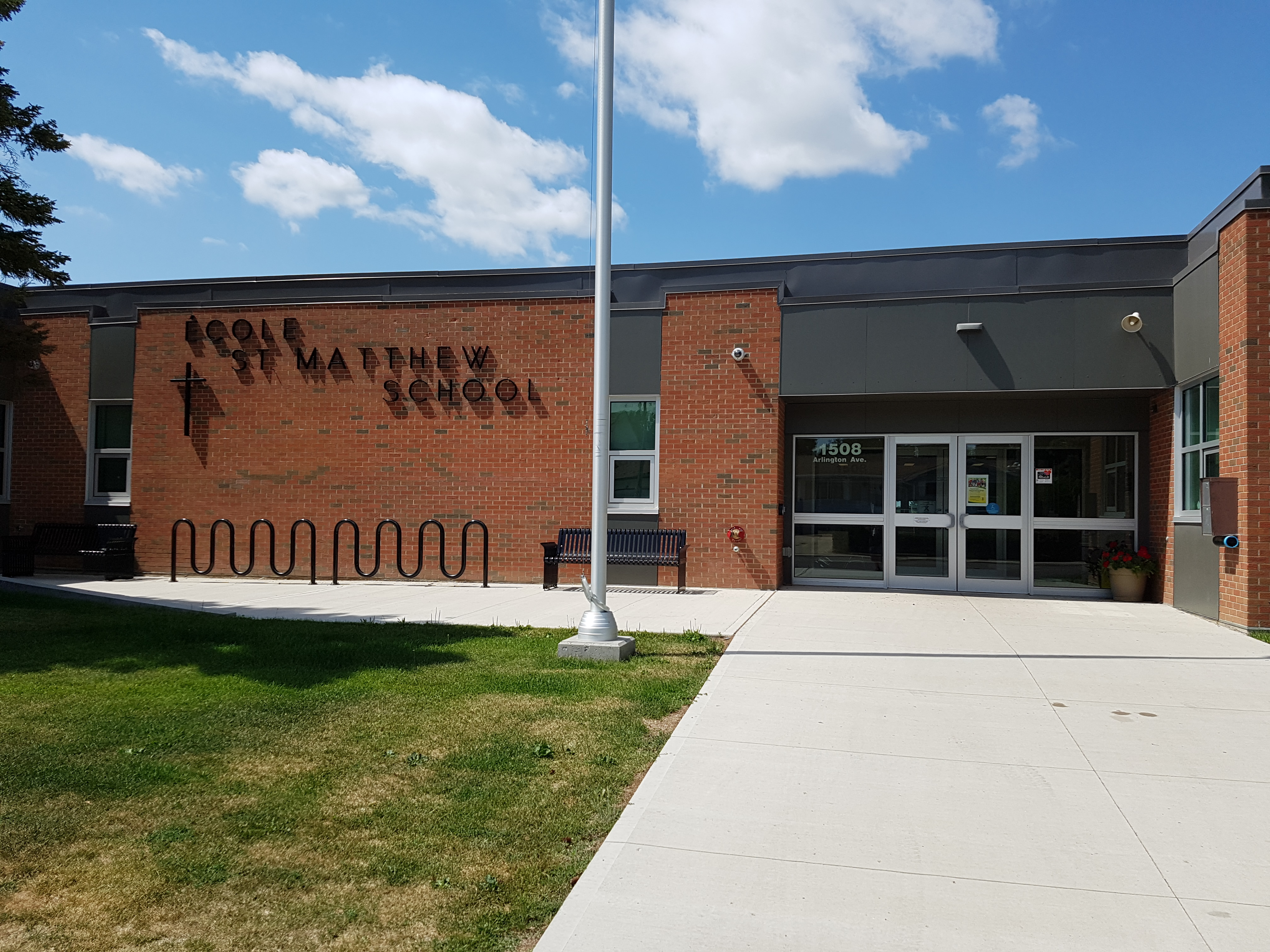

Location
- 1508 Arlington Avenue; Saskatoon, Saskatchewan, S7H 2Y2; Canada

Information
- Type: Elementary
- Religious affiliation: Catholic
- Opened: 1965
- School board: Greater Saskatoon Catholic Schools
- Principal: Marc Colleaux
- Grades: Pre-Kindergarten to Grade 8
- Enrollment: 466 (2017)
- Education system: Separate
- Language: English, French Immersion
- Feeder to: Holy Cross High School
- Website: École St. Matthew School

- Brevoort Park School - public elementary, part of the Saskatoon Public School Division
- École St. Matthew School - separate (Catholic) elementary, part of Greater Saskatoon Catholic Schools

== Parks and recreation ==
- Brevoort Park South - 3.6 acres (1.5 ha)
- Brevoort Park North - 15.6 acres (6.3 ha)

The Brevoort Park Community Association coordinates sports for children/youth, delivers fitness, recreation, and leisure programs, and organizes special events for residents.

== Commercial ==
Brevoort Park's northern border is part of the 8th Street business district, which includes a large McNally Robinson bookstore. There is also a small collection of businesses in the center of the neighbourhood on Early Drive.

== Location ==
Brevoort Park is located within the Nutana Suburban Development Area. It is bounded by 8th Street to the north, Circle Drive to the east, Taylor Street to the south, and Preston Avenue to the west. Inside those boundaries, the roads are a mix of local and collector roads. Brevoort Park's streets are named after Saskatoon's early pioneers.
