= 8th Street East (Saskatoon) =

Road in Saskatoon, Saskatchewan

Coordinates: 52.1147°N 106.5326°W

8th Street E
- Interactive map of 8th Street E
- Maintained by: City of Saskatoon
- Length: 10.9 km (6.8 mi)
- Location: Saskatoon
- West end: Lorne Avenue
- Major junctions: Broadway Avenue; Circle Drive
- East end: Saskatoon City Limits; continues as Twp Road 364

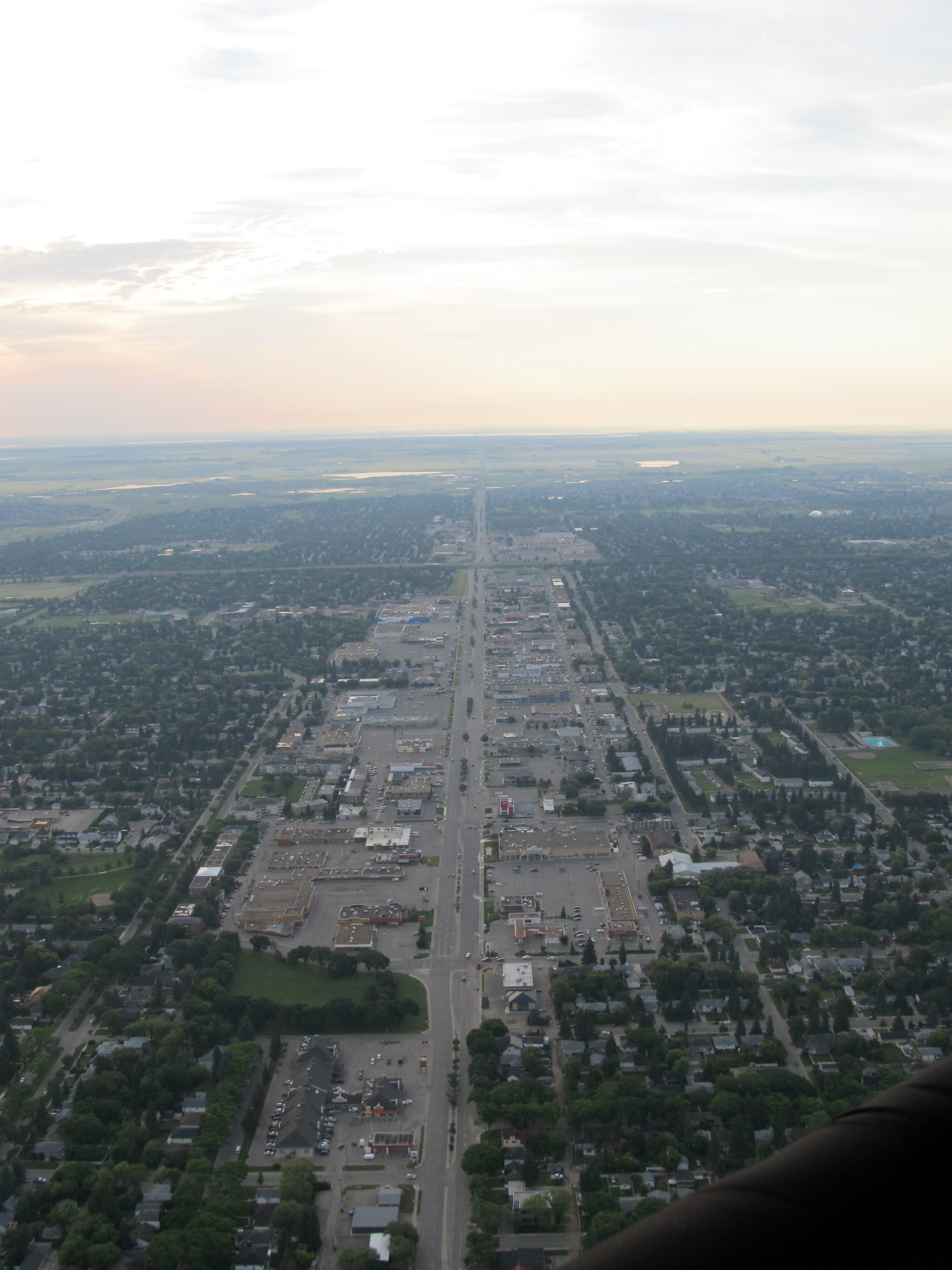
Aerial view of 8th Street East in Saskatoon, Saskatchewan, Canada. View is looking east - nearest cross street is Ewart Avenue

8th Street East is an arterial road serving the city of Saskatoon, Saskatchewan. It begins as a continuation of a minor residential street (8th Street West) at Lorne Avenue in Saskatoon, and runs through the eastern part of city, eventually exiting the city limits as a country road.

== Route description ==
8th Street East begins at the Lorne Avenue/8th Street West, which provides access to northbound and from southbound Idylwyld Drive. It passes through the residential neighbourhood of Nutana as a treelined four lane street with a boulevard, intersecting Broadway Avenue and forming the southern boundary of the Broadway Business Improvement District.

East of Clarence Avenue it becomes one of the city's main suburban commercial districts with many shops and businesses located along the roadway, including a The Centre, one of Saskatoon's largest shopping malls, near Circle Drive, as well as several strip malls. Until the 1980s–early 1990s it also featured a number of motels and hotels, but these were gradually demolished in favour of retail development. It is also home to many restaurants. The commercial development ends east of McKercher Drive, and it downgrades to a two-lane road east of Boychuk Drive.

After crossing a set of railway tracks, 8th Street East becomes semi-rural and becomes a gravel road east of Brighton Boulevard. After leaving the city limits, it becomes Township Road 364 and travels through the eastern part of Corman Park Rural Municipality to Highway 316 in the RM of Blucher near Patience Lake.

== History ==
The intersection of 8th Street and Circle Drive used to have a traffic circle, which opened in 1969, and at the time was on the eastern edge of the city. As time progressed and traffic increased, the traffic circle became contentious as drivers found it confusing to navigate. It was considered one of the most dangerous intersections in the city, and plans to replace the traffic circle were contemplated in the early 1980s. In 1988, the City of Saskatoon replaced it with a split intersection with provisions for a future interchange; an overpass and conversion to diamond interchange was completed in 1999.

== Future ==
The City of Saskatoon has long term plans to development 8th Street east of the railway as part of the Holmwood Suburban Development Area, serving the developing Brighton neighbourhood. As part of the plan, 8th Street East will see retail/commercial development between future extensions of McOrmond Drive and Zimmerman Road. The long-term plan also includes a grade-separated railway crossing.

East of the Homwood SDA, the province of Saskatchewan has plans to construct a perimeter highway around Saskatoon and plans construct an interchange with 8th Street East.

== Major intersections ==
The entire route is in Saskatoon.

km	mi	Destinations	Notes
0.0	0.0	Saskatchewan Crescent	As 8th Street W
0.3	0.19	Lorne Avenue	Becomes 8th Street E
0.3	0.19	Idylwyld Drive (Highway 11 north)	Southbound exit and northbound entrance
0.8	0.50	Victoria Avenue	
1.2	0.75	Broadway Avenue	
1.9	1.2	Clarence Avenue S	
2.7	1.7	Cumberland Avenue S	
3.6	2.2	Preston Avenue S	
4.8	3.0	Circle Drive (Highway 11 / Highway 16)	Diamond interchange
5.2	3.2	Acadia Drive	
6.0	3.7	McKercher Drive	
6.8	4.2	Boychuck Drive	
8.4	5.2	Brighton Boulevard (McOrmond Road)	Temporary access to McOrmond Drive
10.9	6.8	Township Road 364	Continues into east
1.000 mi = 1.609 km; 1.000 km = 0.621 mi: Incomplete access

== See also ==
- List of Saskatchewan provincial roads
