= Roads in Saskatchewan =

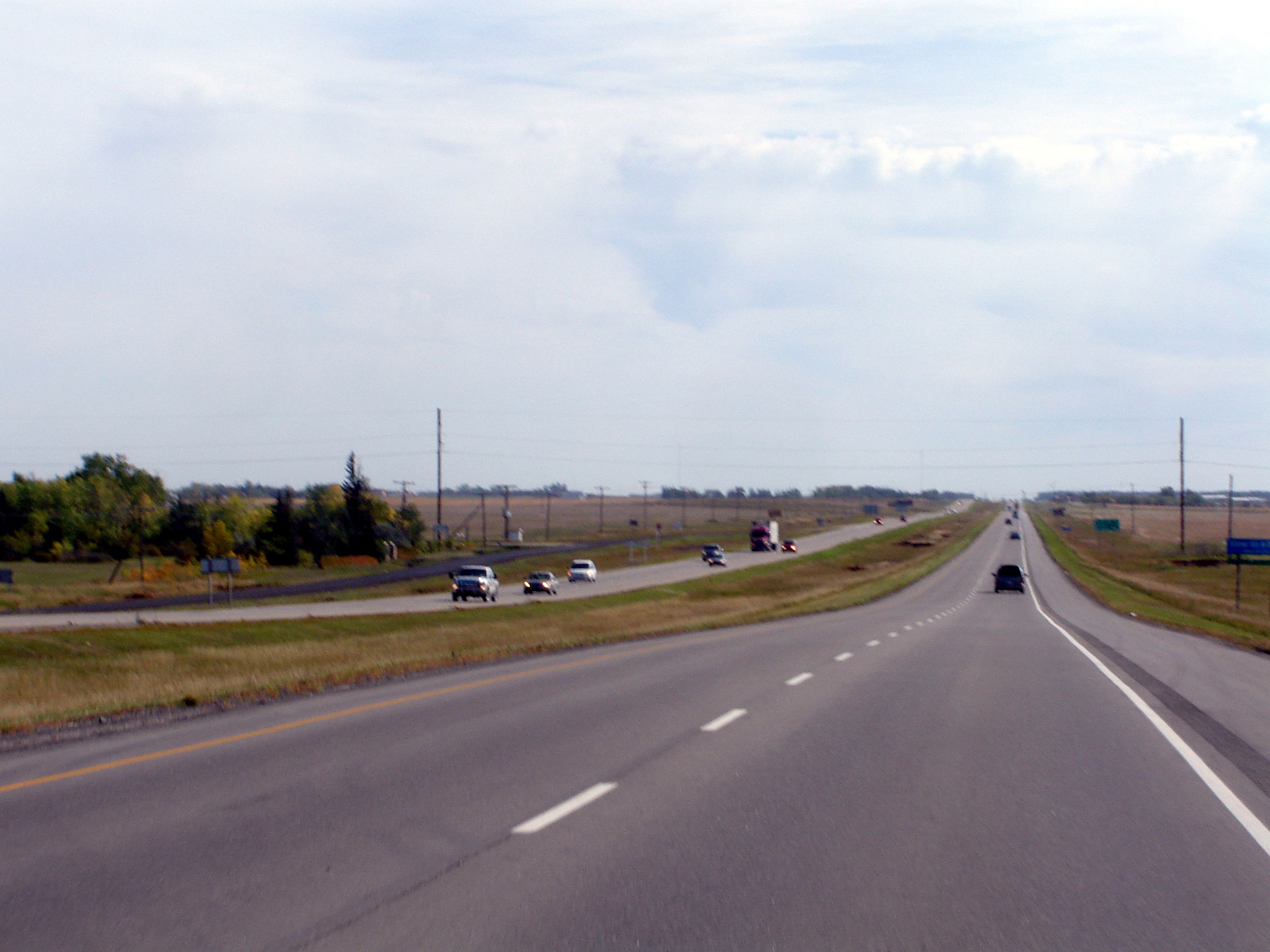
Divided highway (twinned) Sk Hwy 1 Regina – Pilot Butte

Saskatchewan, the middle of Canada's three prairie provinces, has an area of 588,276.09 square kilometres (227,134.67 sq mi) and population of 1,150,632 (according to 2016 estimates), mostly living in the southern half of the province.

Currently Ministry of Highways and Infrastructure operates over 26,000 km (16,000 mi) of highways and divided highways, over 800 bridges, 12 separate ferries, and one barge. There are also municipal roads which comprise different surfaces. Asphalt concrete pavements comprise almost 9,000 km (5,600 mi), granular pavement almost 5,000 km (3,100 mi), non structural or thin membrane surface TMS are close to 7,000 km (4,300 mi) and finally gravel highways make up over 5,600 km (3,500 mi) through the province. TMS roads are maintained by the provincial government department: Saskatchewan Highways and Transportation. In the northern sector, ice roads which can only be navigated in the winter months comprise another approximately 150 km (95 mi) of travel. Dirt roads also still exist in rural areas and would be maintained by the local residents. All in all, Saskatchewan consists of over 250,000 km (160,000 mi) of roads, the highest length of road surface compared to any other Canadian province. Roads need to be constructed for the hot summer months, as well as the frigid winter months. Saskatchewan Highways and Transportation seeks to provide an operational transportation system that ensures the safe travel of people and products within a vast province. Crack filling, snow and ice removal, pavement marking, signage, lighting, and infrastructure planning. The rural municipalities care for rural roads of which 97 per cent are gravel and the rest asphalt surface which is similar to Ireland's road system.

== History and trails ==
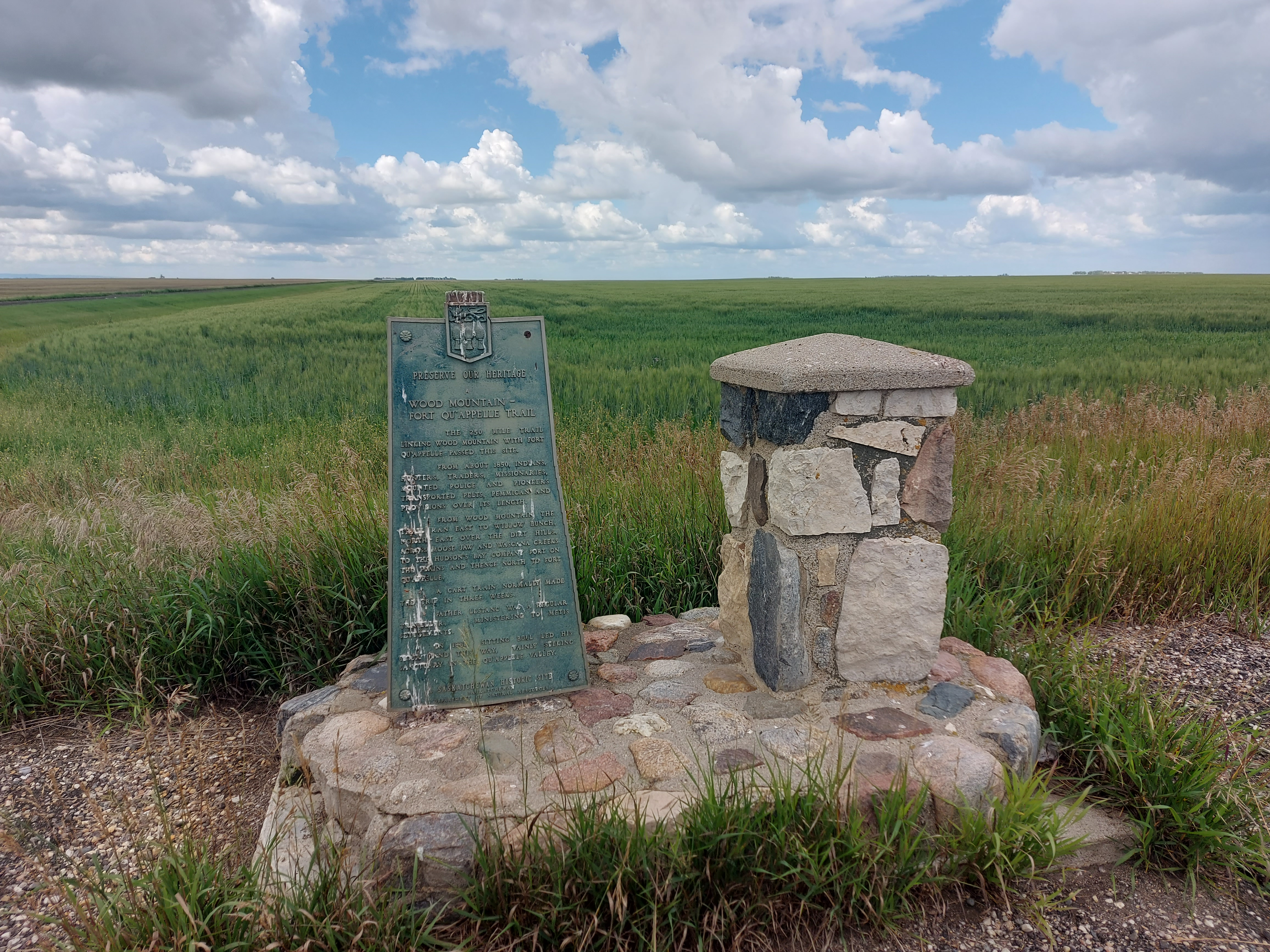
A plaque along Highway 6 commemorating the Wood Mountain – Fort Qu'Appelle Trail

Saskatchewan roads first began as hunting trails following the paths of animals. During the 18th and 19th centuries, fur trading posts were established, and named Red River cart trails appeared networking across Rupert's Land. Some of the early trails between trading posts included:

- Boundary Survey Trail
  - NWMP Commission Trail
  - Red Coat Trail
- Telegraph Line Trail
- Fort Pelly – Fort Ellice Trail
- Swift Current – Battleford Trail
- Fort Qu'Appelle – Touchwood Hills Trail
- Touchwood – Fort Pelly Trail
- Fort Qu'Appelle – Touchwood Trail
- Wood Mountain – Fort Qu'Appelle Trail
- Wood Mountain – Fort Ellice Trail
- Fort à la Corne – Cumberland House Trail
- Fort à la Corne – Fort Ellice Trail
- Green Lake Trail
- Fort Ellice – Fort Qu'Appelle Trail
- Fort Qu'Appelle – Cypress Hills Trail
- Whoop-Up Trail
- Wood Mountain Trail
- Milk River Trail
- Fort Walsh – Wood Mountain Trail
- Carlton Trail

== Early railways ==
The early rail line was constructed by the Canadian Pacific Railway between 1881 and 1885. The first proposal was northerly through the District of Saskatchewan of the North West-Territories to support the fur trade economic industry. The final established route was through the District of Assiniboia of the North-West Territories. The new economy saw grain and agricultural farming as a viable alternative and Clifford Sifton implemented a massive immigration policy in support of settling the west. The rail lines followed the established trails generally as the most practical method of travelling through the prairies.

== Evolution ==
The early trail days employed Red River cart and bull or horse and cart. This method of travel was upgraded to rail travel until the advent of the Industrial Revolution and mechanized motor travel. Automobile and truck travel was employed in the early 20th century with early highways and roads being under construction. The early roadways for the main, ran parallel to the rail lines. The auto was abandoned in the depression years of the dirty thirties, and cars were towed by horse and became known as Bennett buggies. The years following World War II showed much growth as the social economic lifestyle of Saskatchewan changed considerably. Gone were the farmers on each quarter section, and also leaving the prairie landscape were elevators. Grain storage elevators used to be required every 6 to 8 miles (9.7–12.9 km) for loads by horse and cart. Combines introduced large scale farms, trucks introduced larger centres with a larger quantity of elevators. Soon also the branch rail lines disappeared. As farms became larger, so too did many of the early township roads and road allowances disappear.

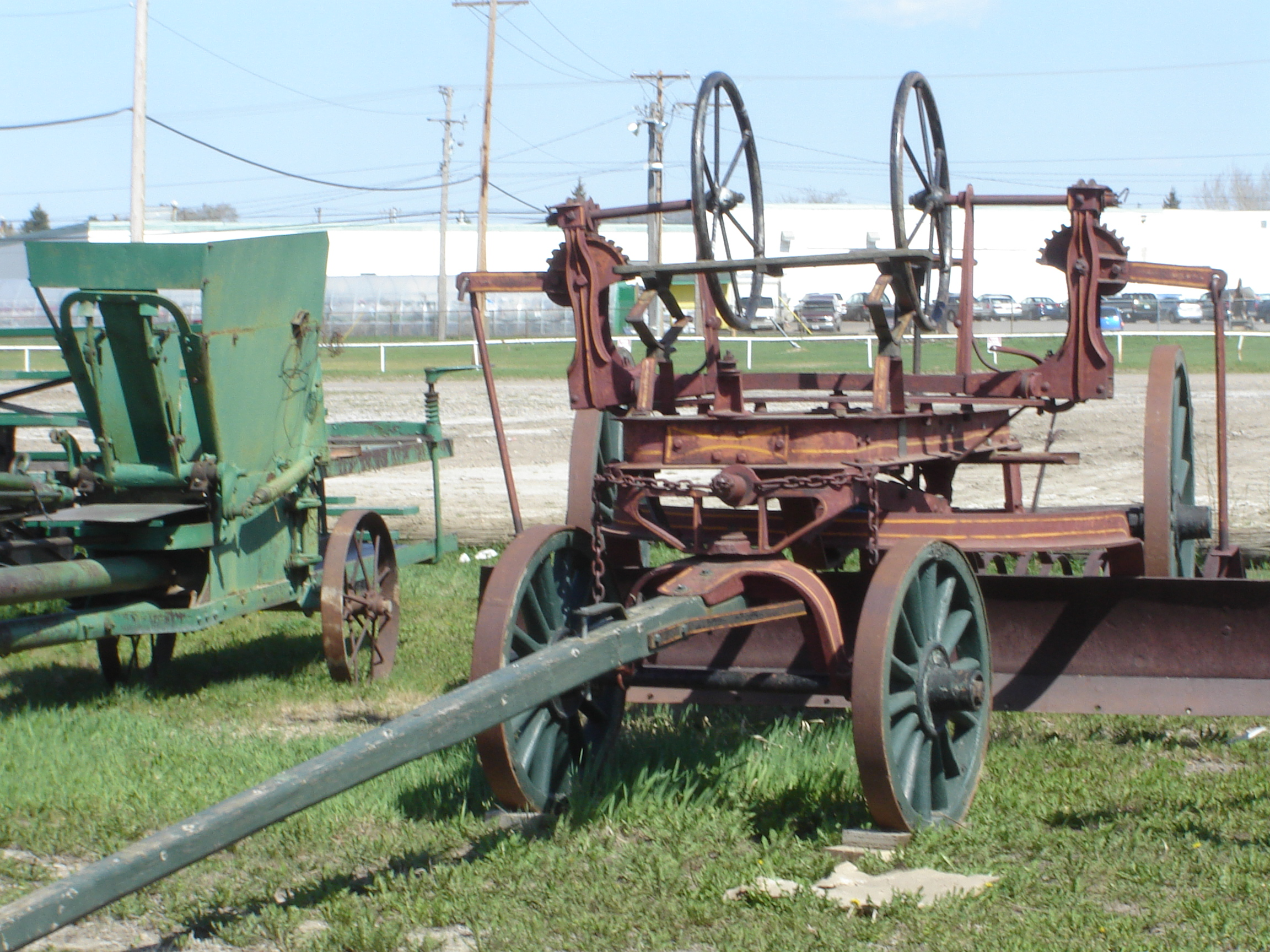
Horse-drawn scraper

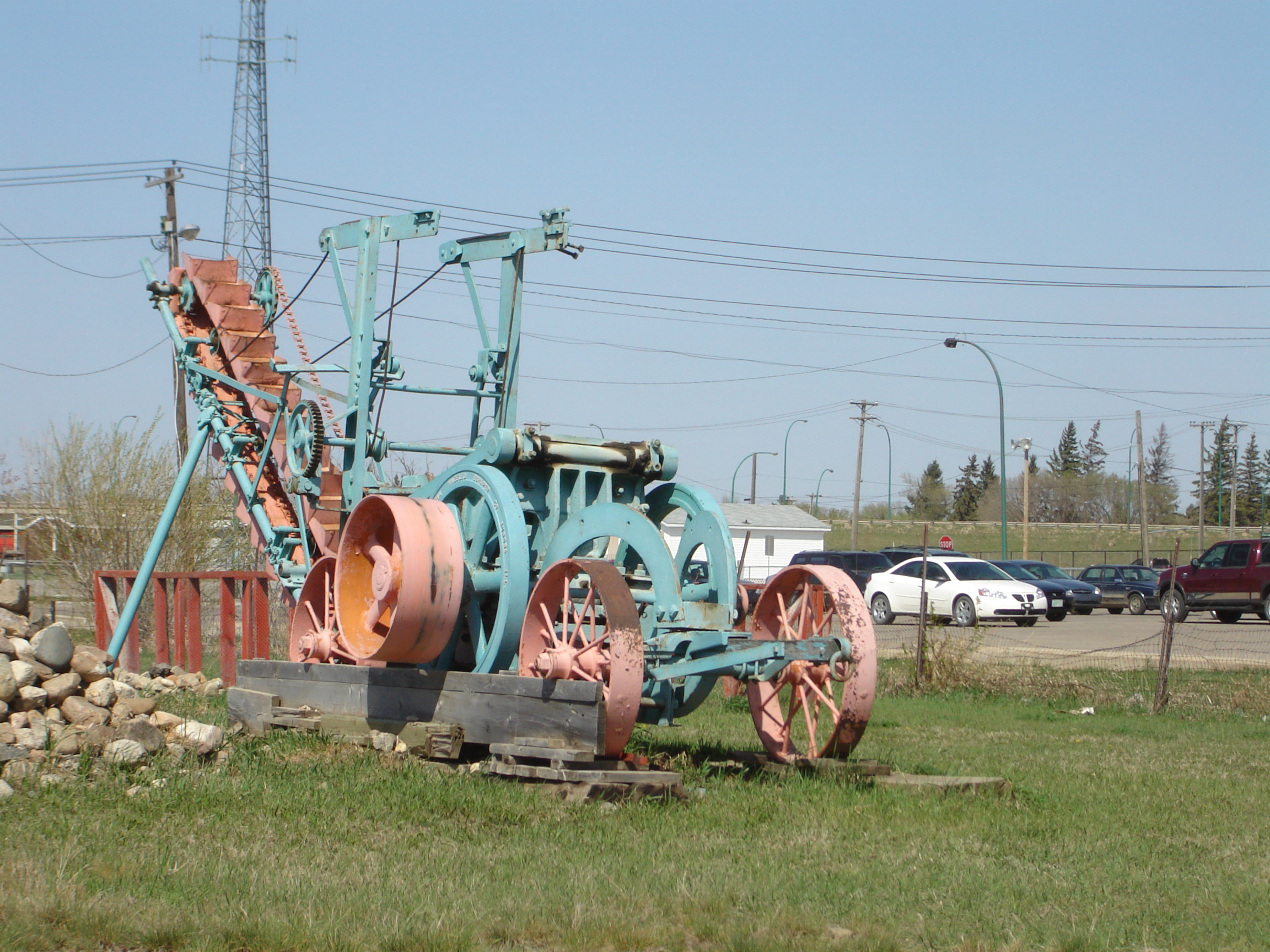
Historical rock picker

== Dominion Land Survey system ==
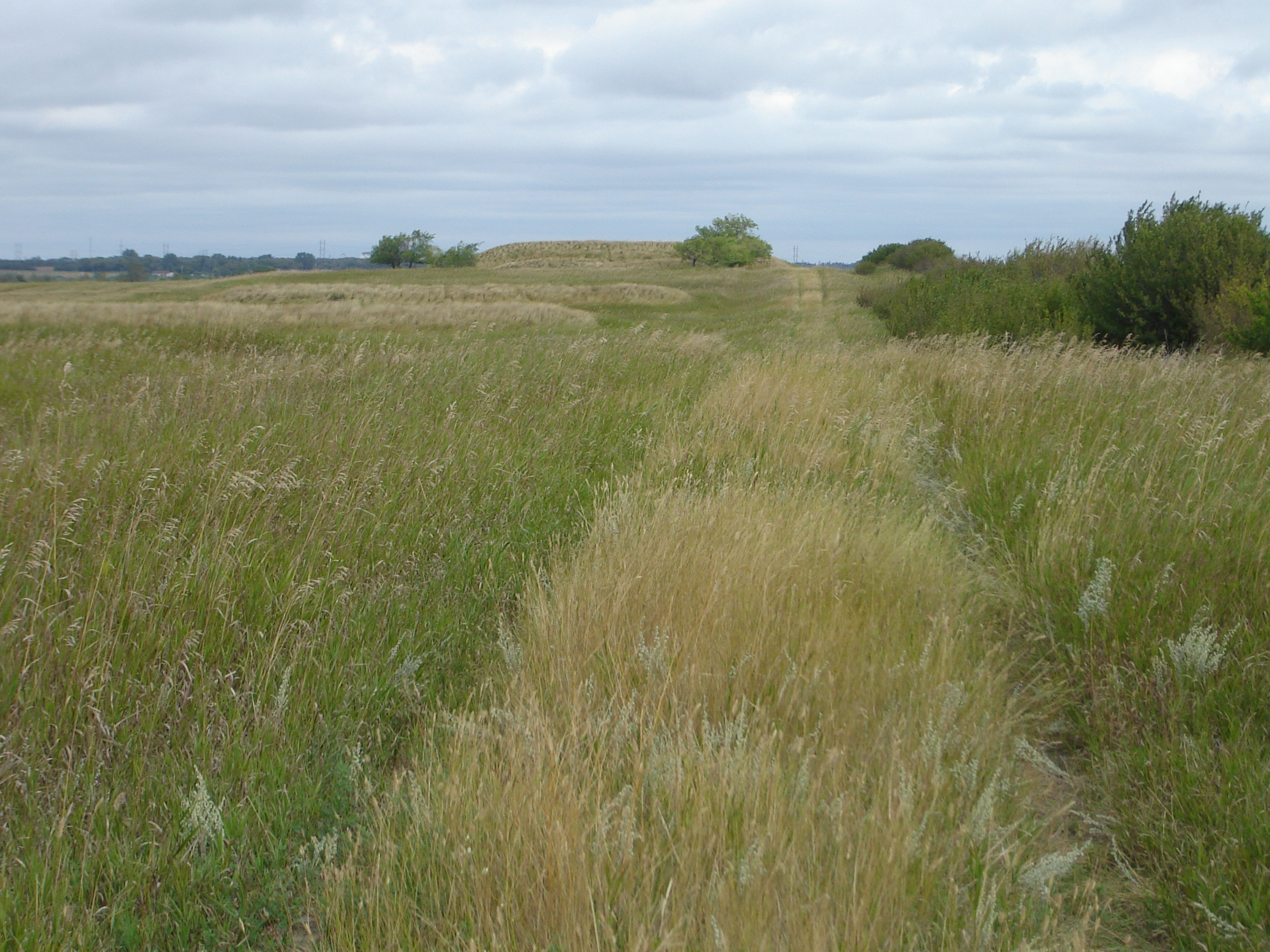
Surveyed road allowance

Early surveyors surveyed the prairies into township and range lines which were 6 miles (9.7 km) apart. Townships which comprised 36 sections had surveyed road allowances through them. Sections themselves were one mile square (2.6 km^{2}), and had monuments generally placed at the north, north-east and east corners. The west side of the range road allowance (travel north and south) meets with the iron post set at the surveyed location, and the south side of the township road (road travels east and west) also meets up with the survey marker. Therefore, road allowances are always to the east and north of the markers.

== Township roads and range roads ==
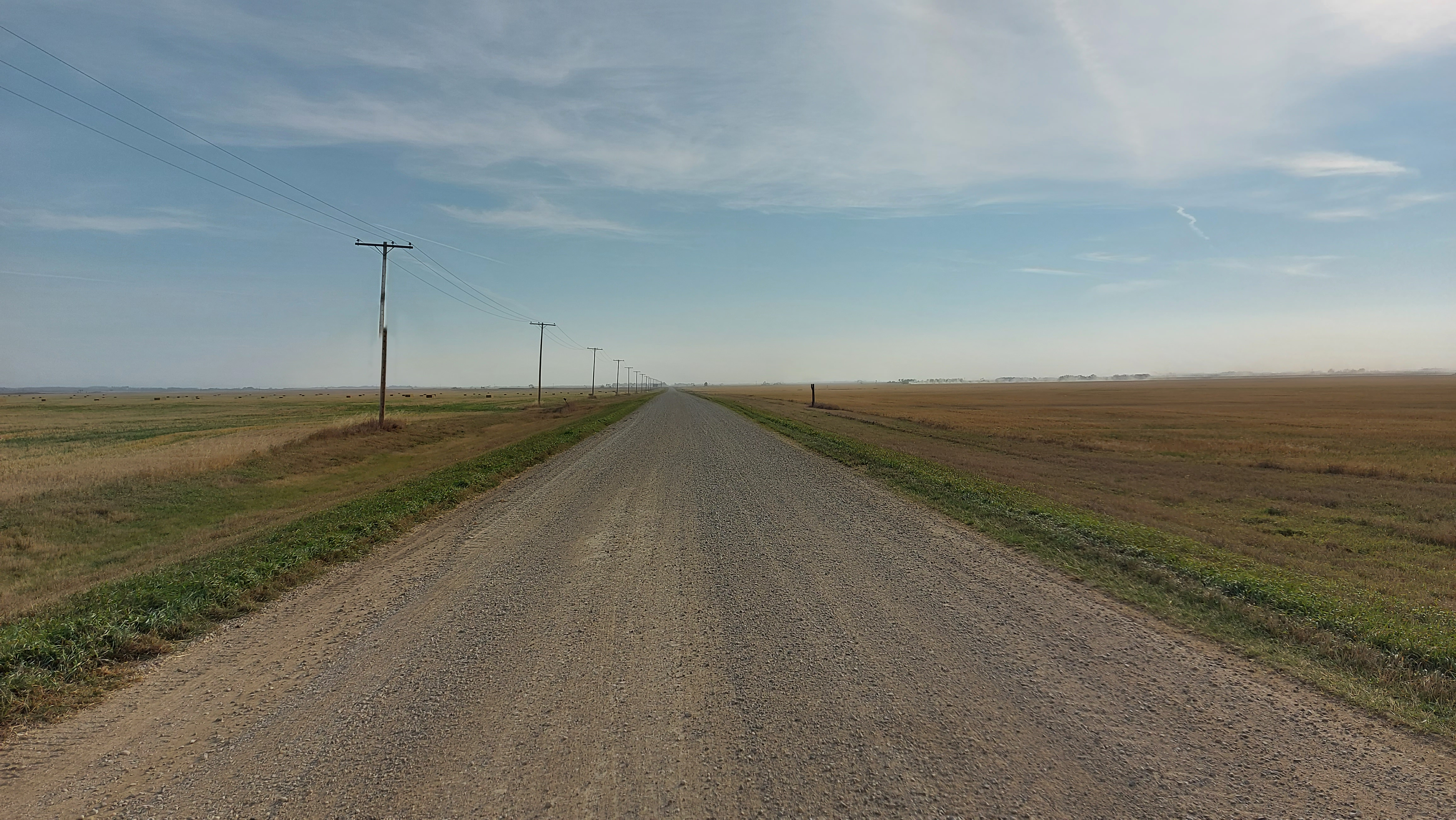
Township Road 84, RM of Moose Mountain No. 63

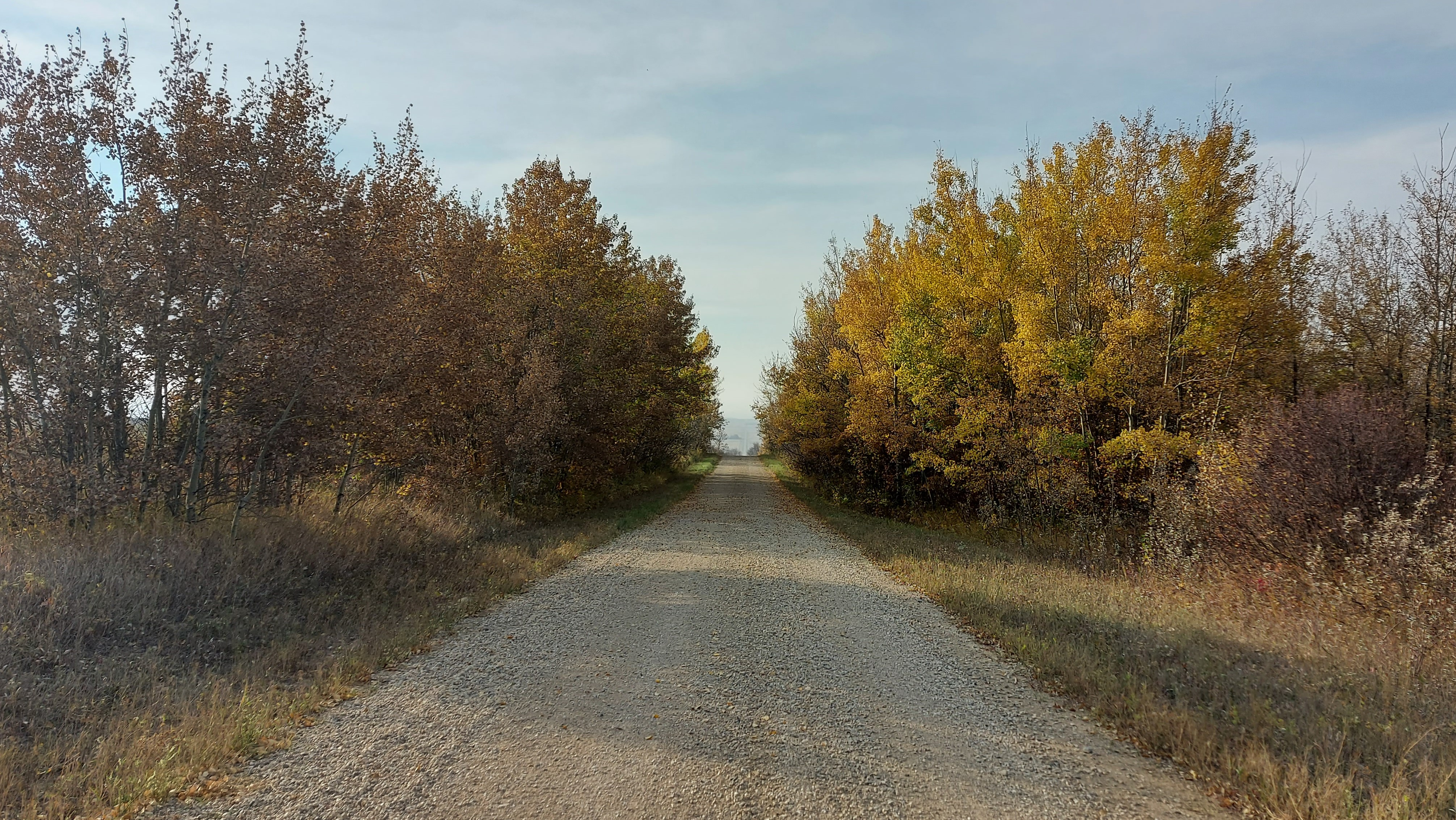
Range Road 2035, near Saskairie, RM of Moose Mountain No. 63

Township roads and range roads have a definite numbering system which is used across rural municipalities. The numbers help to establish the location of the roads as they exist with relation to the Dominion Land Survey system. Range roads travel in a north and south direction on a line of longitude. Range roads indicate first the meridian number. In Saskatchewan roads near the Manitoba border begin with 1 as they are west of the prime or First Meridian, then the range numbers are west of the second and finally west of the Third Meridian. There are no roads in Saskatchewan west of the Fourth Meridian as the Fourth Meridian line defines the border between Alberta and Saskatchewan. A range is numbered at 6-mile (9.7 km) increments. The next two digits are the range number, which increments from east to west from a meridian line. The last range number shows how many miles within the range the road is located starting at the easternmost edge of the range and travelling west. Whereas, a township road number first states the township number. A township number is determined by travelling north from the border between United States and Canada (at 49th parallel north) and incrementing every 6 miles (9.7 km) northward. The miles within the township are indicated next, and as a township is 6 miles (9.7 km) in length, the mile number is therefore between 0 and 5. Township and range roads can begin and end, as they meet with geological features such as lakes, or urban centres such as cities. As they mark a definite location such as a longitudes and latitudes, the naming convention is the same across Saskatchewan. Township and range roads can be either gravel, highway, or municipal paved road. The Dominion Land Survey system designated a township road allowance every mile apart, and allowed for a range road allowance every two miles apart.

For example, Range Road 3054 runs concurrent with Lorne Avenue in Saskatoon as well as Saskatchewan Highway 219 south of the city of Saskatoon. The numbers therefore mean that the road is west of the third meridian and is in the fifth range west of the third meridian. And the road is four miles west of the range border within range five. Mathematically this particular range road is therefore located (5 − 1) × 6 + 4 = 28 miles (45 km) west of the third meridian. Taking now a township road, for example, Township Road 390, which is concurrent with Saskatchewan Highway 784 at Warman, Saskatchewan. This road is in the 39th township north of the Canada–United States border, and as well, the road is immediately on the border edge of the township and does not progress by any number of miles within the township. So therefore this road is mathematically speaking (39 − 1) × 6 = 228 miles (367 km) north of the United States and Canada border.

== Naming of roads ==
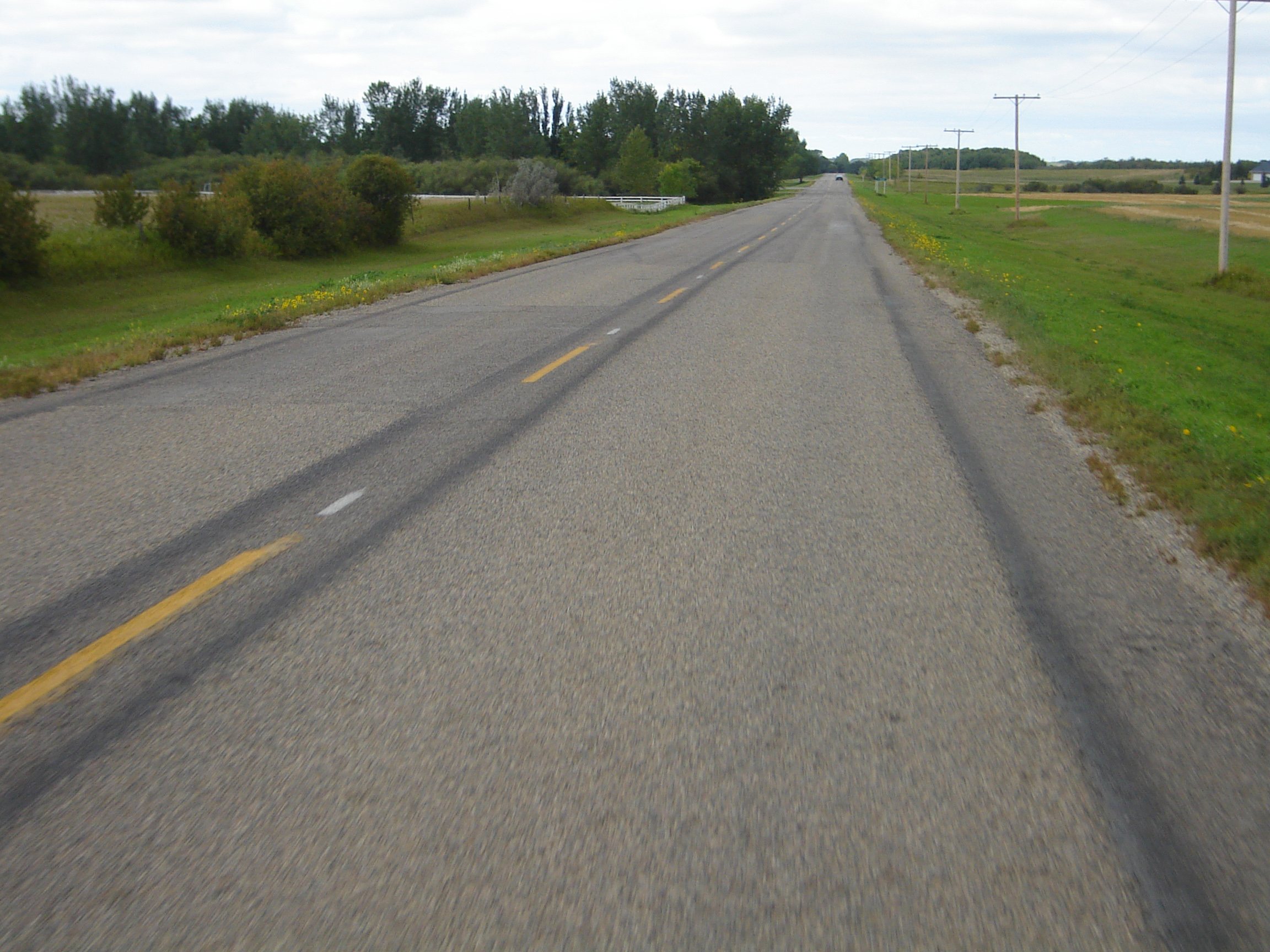
Grasswood Road

Just as county highways of Ontario may be named after people, geographic features, or communities, so also can Saskatchewan municipal roads and highways be designated with a naming system upon submission to Saskatchewan Highways and Transportation. Many municipal roads are named after sidings, one-room school houses, or ghost towns of Saskatchewan. For example, Strehlow Road which intersects with Saskatchewan Highway 11 north of Dundurn, Saskatchewan, indicates the ghost town of Strehlow. As well, Grasswood Road indicates the hamlet of Grasswood, Saskatchewan, as well as the original one-room school house of Grasswood School district #3998. Indi road south of Dundurn, indicates by marker and commemorative signage the original CNR siding of Indi, Saskatchewan.

== Naming of highways ==
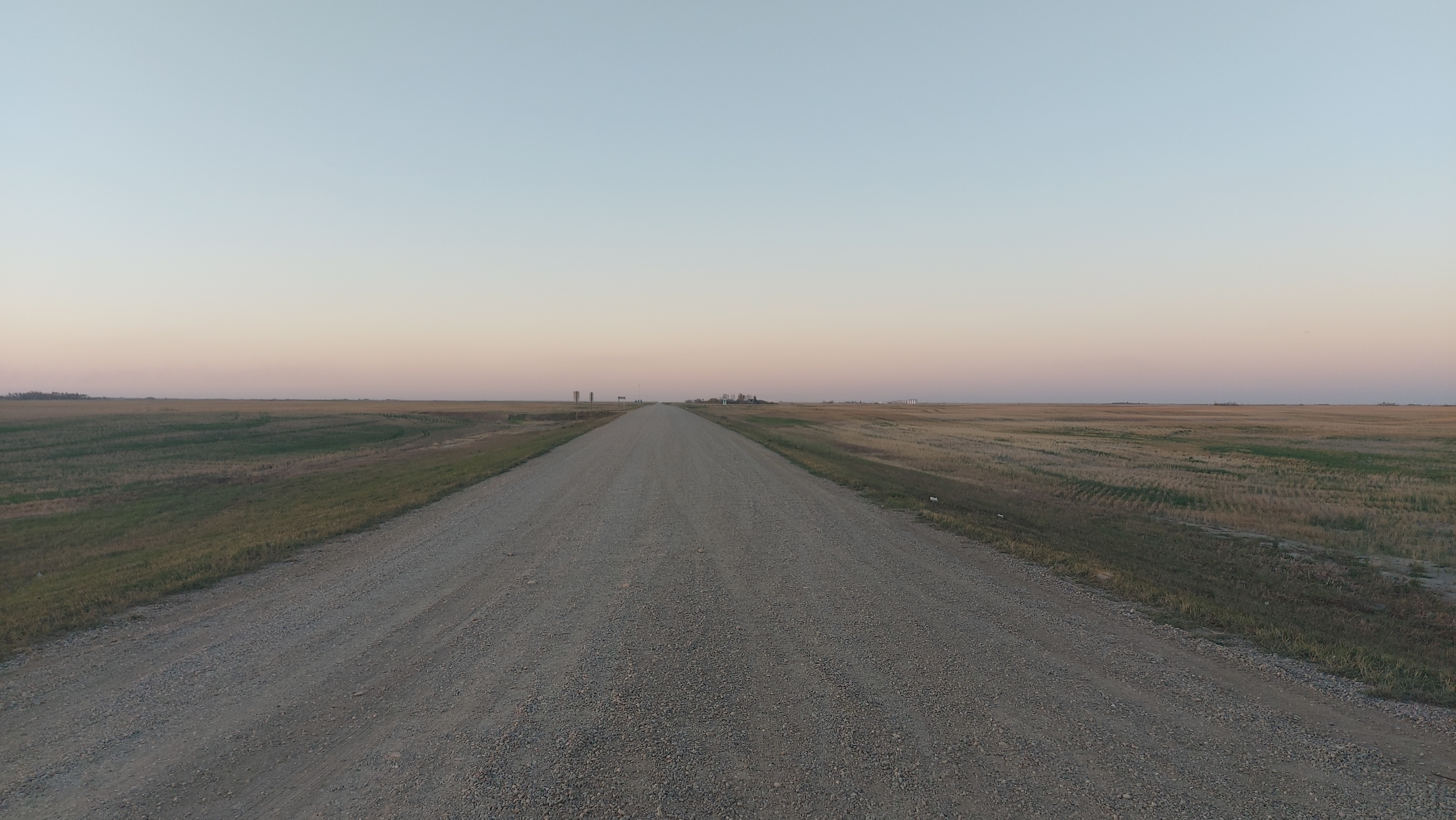
Highway 600 in the RM of Antler No. 61

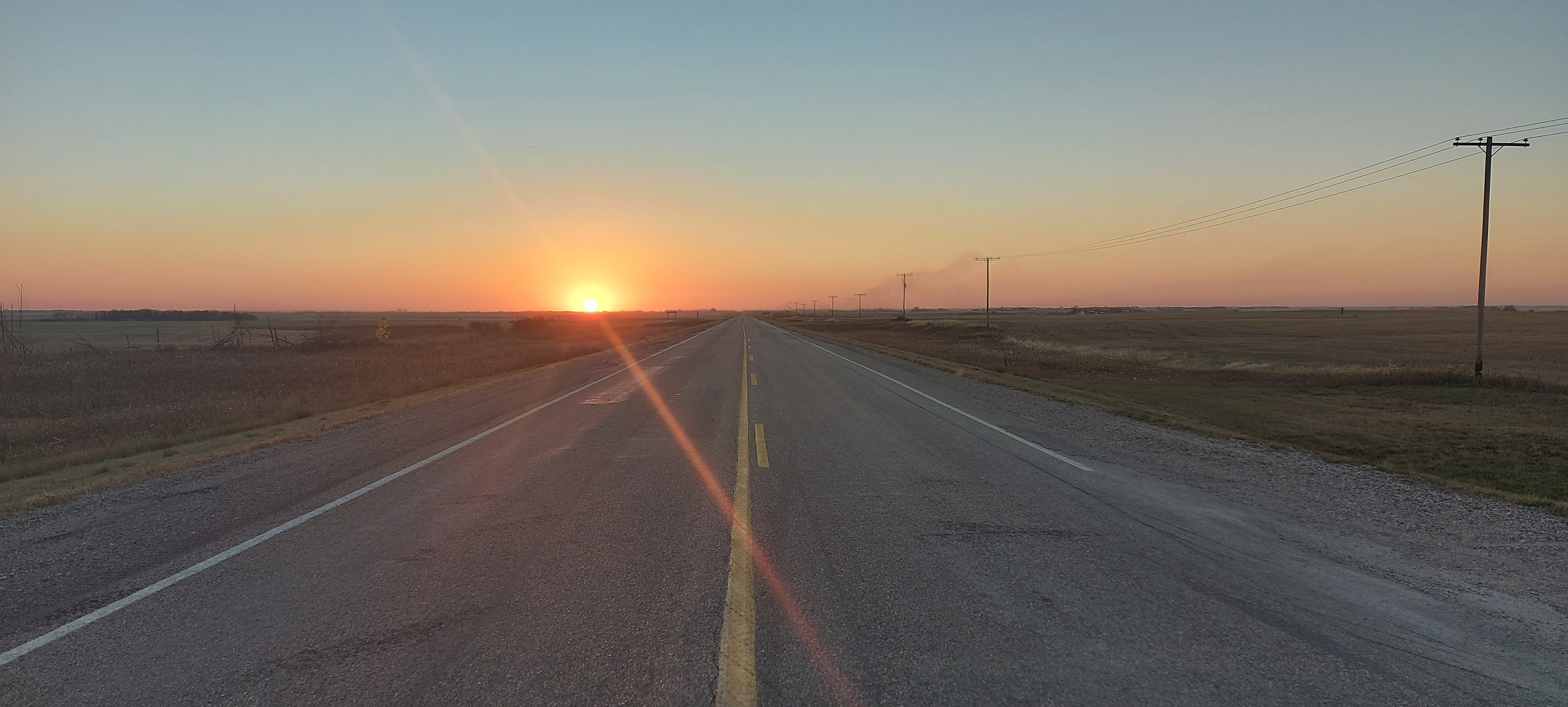
Highway 13, the Red Coat Trail, near Antler

Highway naming began in the 1920s with the two-digit numbering series 1 through 99. These are the main travel routes between main centres, and were typically designated the more important highways of Saskatchewan; however, the rapid expansion of highway development in the 1960s necessitated the use of three-digit highway numbers as well. The two digits of the first highways are often designated in the three-digit numbers as the additional highway may be an extension of the two-digit highway. So the highways numbered between 100 and 199 typically include northern routes. The 200 to 299 numbered highways comprise scenic provincial routes or travel to a provincial or regional park. A Saskatchewan town may be accessed via a highway numbered between 300 and 399. Some portions of the 300-series of highways in Saskatchewan (305, 312) reflect past routes of provincial highways that have been realigned or reassigned. The highway numbering series between 600 and 699 include gravel roads which extend across the province in a north and south direction with the 600 series incrementing in travel east to west. The highways of Saskatchewan designated with the numbers between 700 and 799 are also typically gravel roads maintained by the rural municipality. The three digit highway numbers beginning with 7 extend east and west across Saskatchewan, and increment higher with travel from south to north. The final highway numbering system in use comprises the numbers 900–999 which are far north roads accessing communities or resources north of the tree line. Besides these provincial numbers, some highways have commemorative names.

- The Red Coat Trail or Saskatchewan Highway 13 commemorates the Red Coat trail taken by Sir Redvers Buller during the Red River Rebellion and the North-West Mounted Police's March West.
- Louis Riel Trail includes 364 km (226 mi) of Saskatchewan Highway 11.
- Yellowhead Highway or Saskatchewan Highway 16 connects the four western provinces in an east and west travel route north of the Saskatchewan Highway 1.
- CanAm Highway travels in a north–south direction comprising Saskatchewan Highways SK 35, Sk 39, Sk 6, Sk 3, Sk 2 as well as U.S. Route 85. This super corridor connects Texas in southern United States to northern Saskatchewan.
- Saskota Flyway Scenic Drive Route or Saskatchewan Highway 9 is a historic north–south route between North Dakota, in the United States and northern Saskatchewan.
- Trans-Canada Highway or Saskatchewan Highway 1 connects ten Canadian provinces in an east and west travel route south of the Yellowhead Highway.
- Northern Woods and Water Route which comprises an east and west scenic route along Saskatchewan Highway 9 and Saskatchewan Highway 55. The tree line marks the separation of Saskatchewan prairies and parkland and the northern lakeland and forested area. Northern Saskatchewan was home to the fur trade industry and the earliest trading post economy. Northern Woods and Water Route commemorates the waterways and woodland areas first valued in this area by first nations and fur trader.
- Veterans Memorial Highway is the official name of Saskatchewan Highway 2 between Moose Jaw and Prince Albert.
- Hanson Lake Road: Primary gravel Saskatchewan Highway 120 and primary paved Saskatchewan Highway 106 between Prince Albert and Flin Flon.

Highways in Saskatchewan do not have typical exit numbers, but rather name the turn-off-road, or, in one instance, use exit letters for Saskatchewan Highway 11.

== Current infrastructure system ==
At its peak, in the mid 1970s, Saskatchewan had 16,679 km (10,364 mi) of rail lines, which has declined to 13,041 km (8,103 mi) as of 1999. As rail lines are abandoned, a trend which is still continuing, and as elevators are consolidated, the demand for improved roads and highways is ongoing. Improvements are being made on the highway and road network to provide reduced damage to the road system by overweight vehicles. This is achieved by two methods, legislation on trucking, and upgrading the road system to support the vehicle weight.

Saskatchewan covers a vast area, with the majority of the south central grasslands supporting an agricultural economy. The province sustains only 2% of Canada's population, and 20% of Canada's roads. Challenges are presented to support increased demands on the road infrastructure. Over 4,000 km (2,500 mi) of rail lines are not being used (and this number is rising), with this mode of transportation replaced by vehicular traffic. As well Saskatchewan's economy is diversifying into the oil and gas sector, and mining which also is increasing truck traffic. Roads are becoming secondary highways to provide means for the agricultural farmer or the industry trucker to find a route to a city market or consolidated elevator. The quantity of smaller wood grain elevators has declined in favour of concrete inland grain terminals. Grain hauling by truck by tonne-kilometre has increased 17 times over the level of the 1970s. Thin membrane surface TMS roads handle vehicle and light traffic routes. Gravel highways suffice if the average annual daily traffic (AADT) is below 150 vehicles a day. Saskatchewan classifies road system depending on amount of use or road function and can be further designated as major arterial, minor arterial, collector and local.

== See also ==
- List of Saskatchewan provincial highways
- Ministry of Highways and Infrastructure
- Transportation in Saskatchewan
