= Dakota Dunes =

Dakota Dunes may refer to:

- Dakota Dunes, South Dakota, a community in the United States
- Dakota Dunes Casino (or the associated Dakota Dunes Links Golf Course) in Saskatchewan, Canada
