= Furdale =

Coordinates: 52°04′29″N 106°41′39″W

- Designated place
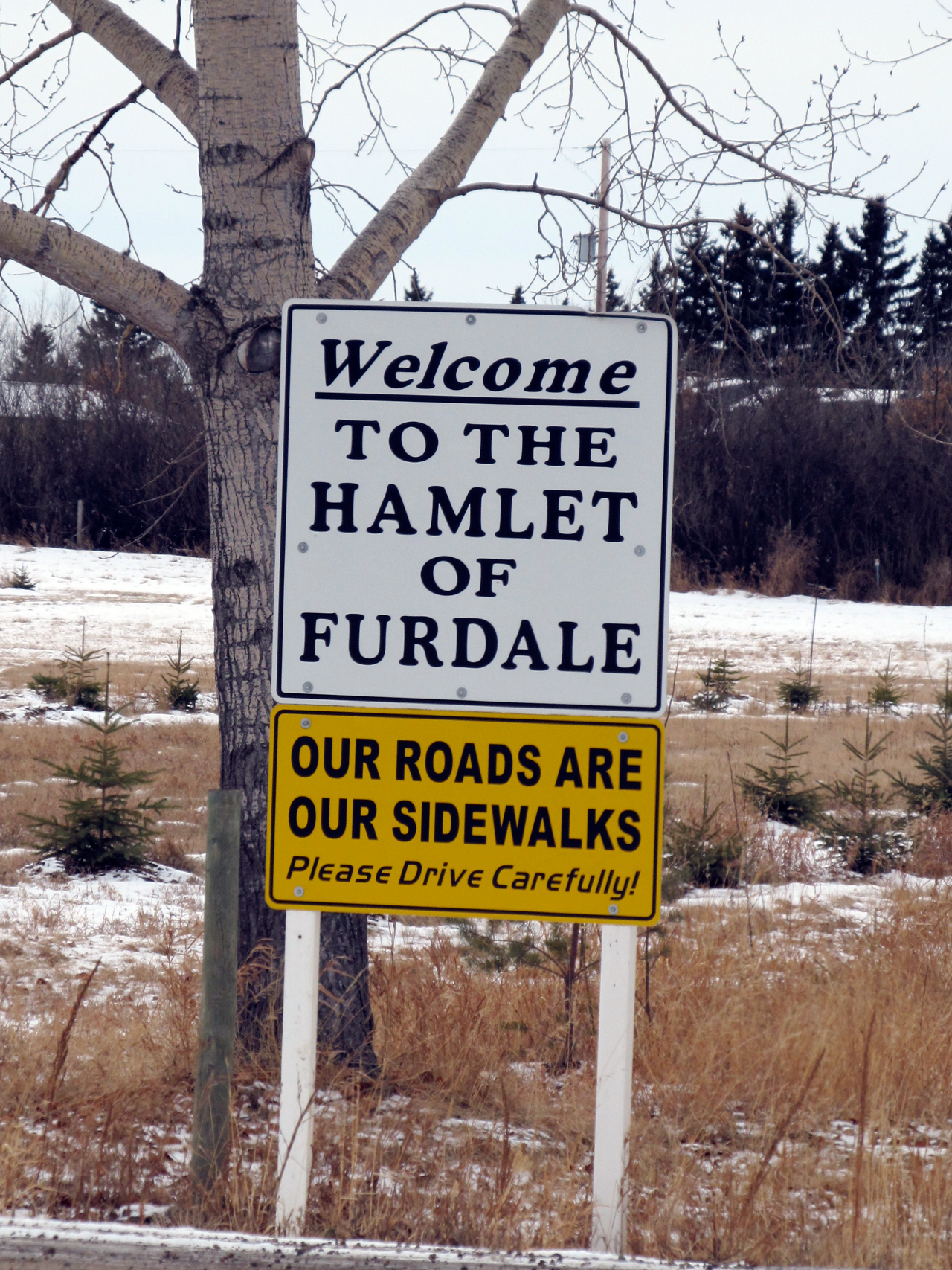
- Sign for Furdale, a hamlet south of Saskatoon, Saskatchewan, Canada.

- Location within Saskatchewan
- Country: Canada
- Province: Saskatchewan
- Census division: Corman Park No. 344

Area
  - Total: 1.99 km^{2} (0.77 sq mi)
  - Land: 1.99 km^{2} (0.77 sq mi)
  - Water: 0 km^{2} (0 sq mi)

Population (2021)
  - Total: 181
  - Density: 91/km^{2} (240/sq mi)
- Time zone: UTC-6 (CST)
  - Summer (DST): UTC-5 (CDT)

Furdale is an unincorporated community adjacent to the southern city limits of Saskatoon, Saskatchewan, west of Highway 219 and on the east bank of the South Saskatchewan River. The hamlet's name comes from the many fur farms located in the area beginning around the 1930s.

Furdale primarily consists of acreages and luxury homes, and is considered a major bedroom community of Saskatoon. A similar unincorporated bedroom community, Grasswood Park, lies immediately to the east. Furdale is also the location of many of the Saskatoon area's major horse stable and breeding facilities. The province is planning to build a Perimeter Highway through Furdale in the coming years, which has sparked controversy among residents. Upgrades to Hwy. 219 (also known as Lorne Avenue) were completed during the summer of 2007 in order to handle the large amounts of traffic back and forth to the new Dakota Dunes Casino. An extension to the Circle Drive freeway, scheduled to open in 2013, will also benefit residents.

Furdale contains virtually no commercial or industrial development, with nearby Saskatoon offering these services. Furdale also relies on Saskatoon for its media, emergency services, etc.

Primary access to Furdale is via Lorne Avenue/Highway 219 from Saskatoon, and Grasswood Road from the east which provides a link to Highway 11.

== History ==
When the half section of land was first surveyed, it was granted to the Hudson Bay Company. It was farmed for a time before being sold, at which point it was subdivided and registered with the Land Titles Office as "Plan FN". Between 1910 and 1912 the land was developed as "Glencairn" and streets were laid.

In September 1958 the Furdale School opened on Haliburton Ave. There were 27 students in attendance during the first year. It operated under the Grasswood School Board and was a typical one-room school house with a single teacher instructing all grades.

The school closed in 1966 with the remaining students attending school in either Clavet or Saskatoon to complete their studies.

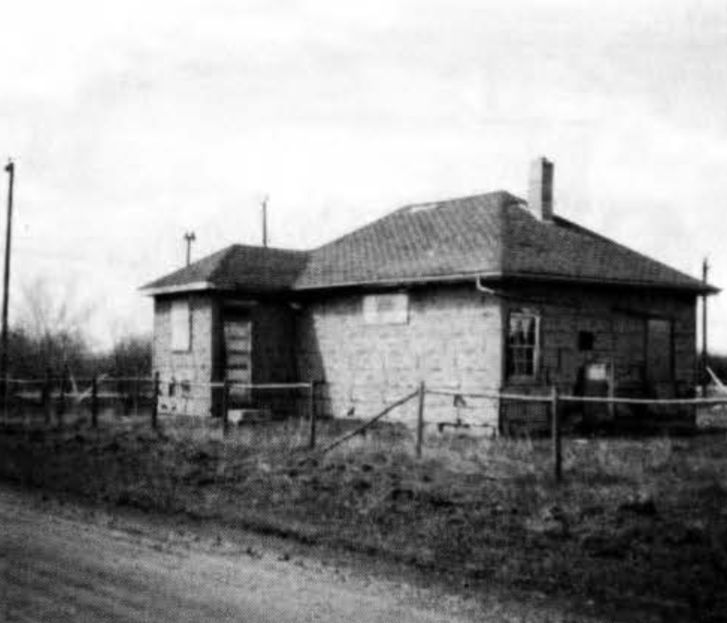
Furdale School House - Haliburton Ave. (Undated)

== Etymology ==
Around 1950, the community members of Glencairn came together to create a curling rink in a former dairy barn and called it the Furdale Curling Club, referencing the multiple fur farms located in the area beginning around the 1930s, including the Saskatoon Silver Fox Farm operated by Dr. R.H. MacDonald which was one of the largest in the area, consisting of more than 700 animals. During the 1950s Archie Campbell's Fur Farm was considered a prominent mink farm operation located in the Furdale area.[1]

== Demographics ==
In the 2021 Census of Population conducted by Statistics Canada, Furdale had a population of 181 living in 70 of its 72 total private dwellings, a change of −3.7% from its 2016 population of 188. With a land area of 1.99 km^{2} (0.77 sq mi), it had a population density of 91.0/km^{2} (235.6/sq mi) in 2021.
