= Saskatoon Freeway =

Proposed limited access highway in Saskatoon, Saskatchewan

Route information
- Length: 55 km (34 mi)

Major junctions
- Orbital around Saskatoon
- South end: Highway 11
- Highway 16 (TCH); Highway 5 Highway 41; Highway 12; Highway 14
- West end: Highway 7 / Highway 60

Location
- Country: Canada
- Province: Saskatchewan

Highway system
- Provincial highways in Saskatchewan

The Saskatoon Freeway (formerly the Saskatoon Perimeter Highway) is a proposed four-lane limited access highway in and adjacent to Saskatoon, Saskatchewan. The 55-kilometre (34 mi) route will connect Highway 11 (south) with Highway 7, forming a partial ring road around the city of Saskatoon. When complete, it will serve as a replacement bypass route for the existing Circle Drive (with the exception of Circle's southwest segment).

== Route description ==
The Saskatoon Freeway is expected to be a four-lane highway that begins at Highway 11 south of Saskatoon and connects with Highway 7 west of the city, and will consist of:

- 55 km (34 mi) of new roadway
- 16 interchanges
- 5 railway overpasses
- 2 flyovers
- 1 major river crossing

The project is divided into three phases. Phases 1, the northern leg, runs from Highway 16 east to the South Saskatchewan River, and includes major interchanges at Highway 12 (Idylwyld Drive) and Highway 11 (north). As part of the project, Highway 11 would continue in Saskatoon along Wanuskewin Road (which becomes Warman Road and 2nd Avenue), while its current connection to Idylwyld Drive would be permanently closed. Phase 2, the eastern leg, runs from the South Saskatchewan River to Highway 11 (south), and will included connections with Highway 41, Highway 5, 8th Street, and Highway 16 (east). Phase 3, the western leg, runs from Highway 16 (west) to the Highway 7/60 intersection, and includes a connection with Highway 14. The project does not include a southeastern leg which would connect Highway 7 to Highway 11 (south) and complete the circle, as it has been determined that the southwest leg of Circle Drive, completed in 2013, is sufficient to handle traffic for the foreseeable future.

The Functional Planning Study for Phase 1 was completed in February 2020, with the remainder scheduled to be completed in 2021. There is no timeline for construction.

It remains to be seen what highway number(s) will be assigned to the Saskatoon Freeway; however, when the Regina Bypass opened, Highway 1 and Highway 11 were moved to the new roadway. Highways 7, 11 and 16 represent National Highway System routes that could be moved to the freeway.

Much as Circle Drive, at the time of its initial construction, encompassed most existing development in Saskatoon, the Saskatoon Freeway as currently routed will encompass most current and near-future development of the city, though some land within the city limits and beyond the freeway has been earmarked for future industrial, commercial and residential development.

== Exit list ==
The following is a list of future proposed interchanges, heading counter-clockwise.

Location	km	mi	Destinations	Notes
Corman Park No. 344			Highway 11 south – Regina	
Corman Park No. 344			Range Road 3045	
Corman Park No. 344			Highway 16 (TCH) east – Yorkton	
Corman Park No. 344			8th Street E	
Saskatoon			Highway 5 east / College Drive – Humboldt	
Saskatoon			Highway 41 east – Wakaw	
Saskatoon			Blackley Road	
Saskatoon			Central Avenue	
Saskatoon			Crosses the South Saskatchewan River	
Saskatoon			Highway 11 north / Wanuskewin Road – Prince Albert	
Saskatoon			Highway 12 north / Idylwyld Drive – Blaine Lake	
Saskatoon			Highway 16 (TCH) west – The Battlefords	
Corman Park No. 344			Beam Road	
Corman Park No. 344			Claypool Drive	
Corman Park No. 344			Highway 14 west / 22nd Street W – Biggar	
Corman Park No. 344			Highway 7 west – Rosetown Highway 60 south – Pike Lake	Roadway would continue south as Hwy 60
1.000 mi = 1.609 km; 1.000 km = 0.621 mi

== See also ==
- Regina Bypass
- Stoney Trail - a similar bypass in Calgary, Alberta
- Anthony Henday Drive - a similar bypass in Edmonton, Alberta
- Perimeter Highway - a similar bypass in Winnipeg, Manitoba
