= Riversdale Business Improvement District =

The Riversdale Business Improvement District (RBID) is a business improvement district located in Saskatoon, Saskatchewan, Canada. It was created through a City of Saskatoon by-law establishing it on February 12, 1990. It is the largest BID is Saskatchewan containing 59 city blocks within its geographic footprint. The boundaries of the Riversdale BID are Idylwyld Drive to the east, 22nd Street West to the north, Avenue P to the West and 17th Street and the South Saskatchewan River to the south. Over the past years, the Riversdale BID has worked to improve economic activity within its borders and has recently become a destination for all visiting Saskatoon, with its eclectic shops, restaurants and rich cultural history.

For over 30 years The Riversdale Business Improvement District has acted as the voice of the community, working to revitalize the area and reimagine its future. Located beside the beautiful South Saskatchewan River and steps from the Downtown business area, Riversdale and Pleasant Hill have exploded with a renewed vigor of the likes never seen before in Saskatoon. Riversdale has seen tremendous growth and transformation, increased property value and incomes, and improved opportunities for all.

For more than 100 years, 20th Street West has served as a commercial corridor in Saskatoon. With the close proximity to a network of CN railway lines, what was once home to sixteen pawn shops is now a bustling area of stores, restaurants and businesses. Riversdale is home to a diverse population of cultures that celebrates differences and welcomes all. Riversdale is full of cultural and artistic expression; through sculptures, murals and the varied mix of businesses that call it home. Rich in history, Riversdale boasts a colourful past and is a catalyst for urban culture and growth. Take a stroll through Riversdale and explore a concentrated, eclectic range of over 100 businesses and support the local, independently owned services and retailers, old and new, that make up this thriving district.
