= Saskatchewan Highway 219 =

Provincial highway in Saskatchewan, Canada

Highway 219
- Chief Whitecap Trail; Lorne Avenue
- Highway 219 highlighted in red

Route information
- Maintained by Ministry of Highways and Infrastructure & Transport Canada
- Length: 96.2 km (59.8 mi)

Major junctions
- South end: Highway 44 near Cutbank
- Highway 15 near Glenside
- North end: Highway 11 in Saskatoon

Location
- Country: Canada
- Province: Saskatchewan
- Rural municipalities: Loreburn, Rudy, Dundurn, Corman Park
- Major cities: Saskatoon

Highway system
- Provincial highways in Saskatchewan
← Highway 212	→ Highway 220

Highway 219 (also known as Chief Whitecap Trail) is a provincial highway in the Canadian province of Saskatchewan. Saskatchewan's 200-series highways primarily service its recreational areas. The highway runs from Gardiner Dam at the north end of Lake Diefenbaker north to the city Saskatoon. It is about 96 kilometres (60 mi) long.

In 2009, the Saskatchewan government added the name 'Chief Whitecap Trail' to the section of Highway 219 from Highway 11 south to Danielson Provincial Park. Chief Whitecap was an "historic Saskatchewan figure and one of Saskatoon's founding fathers".

== Route description ==
Highway 219 starts at Highway 44 near Danielson Provincial Park and Cutbank and travels north, passing through the hamlet of Glenside, intersecting Highway 15 east of the town of Outlook, before passing through Whitecap Dakota First Nation. North of the First Nation, the highway provides access to Beaver Creek and passes by the bedroom communities of Grasswood, Riverside Estates, Casa Rio, and Furdale before entering Saskatoon as Lorne Avenue. It intersects Circle Drive before ending at Idylwyld Drive.

Parks accessed from Highway 219 include Cranberry Flats Conservation Area, Beaver Creek Conservation Area, and Danielson Provincial Park.

== Lorne Avenue ==
Lorne Avenue is a road serving the city of Saskatoon, Saskatchewan, and functions as the division between the East and West addresses on the east side of the South Saskatchewan River. It begins as a continuation of Highway 219 to its intersections of Circle Drive and Idylwyld Drive. North of Adelaide Street, a roadway that connects with northbound Idylwyld Drive, Lorne Avenue downgrades to a collector road, where heavy trucks are prohibited, through the residential neighbourhood of Buena Vista (with some small retail development). North of the intersection of 8th Street, Lorne Avenue rejoins Idylwyld Drive south of the Senator Sid Buckwold Bridge.

In the mid-2000s, the Government of Canada agreed to contribute $20 million for two new interchanges in Saskatoon, one of them being at the SK Hwy 219 / Lorne Ave intersection with Circle Drive. This is part of the Asia-Pacific Gateway and Corridor Initiative to improve access to the Canadian National Railway's intermodal freight terminal thereby increasing Asia-Pacific trade. The interchange, part of the final phase of the Circle Drive South extension, was completed in 2013.

== Major intersections ==
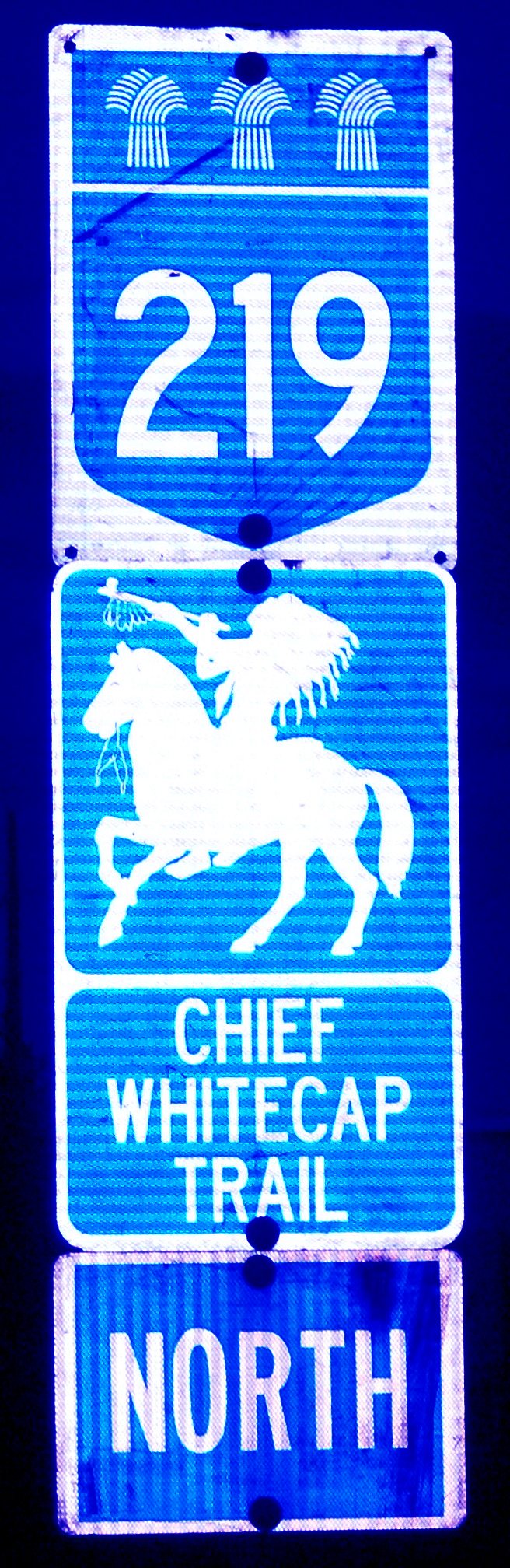
Chief Whitecap Trail

From south to north:

Rural municipality	Location	km	mi	Destinations	Notes
Loreburn No. 254		0.0	0.0	Highway 44 – Gardiner Dam, Davidson	West of Cutbank; Highway 219 southern terminus
Rudy No. 284	Glenside	20.0	12.4	Railway Avenue	
Rudy No. 284		25.9	16.1	Highway 15 – Outlook, Kenaston	
Rudy No. 284		38.8	24.1	Highway 764 – Hanley	
Dundurn No. 314	White Cap No. 94	65.5– 73.7	40.7– 45.8	Passes through Whitecap Dakota First Nation (including access to Dakota Dunes Casino)	
Corman Park No. 344	Grasswood	91.4	56.8	Grasswood Road	
City of Saskatoon		95.4	59.3	Circle Drive (Highway 11 north / Highway 16 west) – Airport	Interchange; no direct access to Circle Drive east
City of Saskatoon		96.1	59.7	To Circle Drive east (Highway 11 south / Highway 16 east)	Ramp to Idylwyld Freeway south; access to Circle Drive east
City of Saskatoon		96.2	59.8	Ruth Street	Access from Idylwyld Freeway; Highway 219 northern terminus; to Prairieland Park
City of Saskatoon		96.4	59.9	Adelaide Street to Idylwyld Freeway (Highway 11 north) – City Centre	Ramp to Idylwyld Freeway; no trucks on Lorne Avenue north of Adelaide Street
City of Saskatoon		97.8– 98.1	60.8– 61.0	8th Street	
City of Saskatoon		97.8– 98.1	60.8– 61.0	Idylwyld Freeway (Highway 11) to Highway 16	Northbound entrance and southbound exit
1.000 mi = 1.609 km; 1.000 km = 0.621 mi: Incomplete access; Route transition

== See also ==
- Transportation in Saskatchewan
- Roads in Saskatchewan
