= Glenside, Saskatchewan =

Village in Saskatchewan, Canada

Glenside
- Village
- Village of Glenside
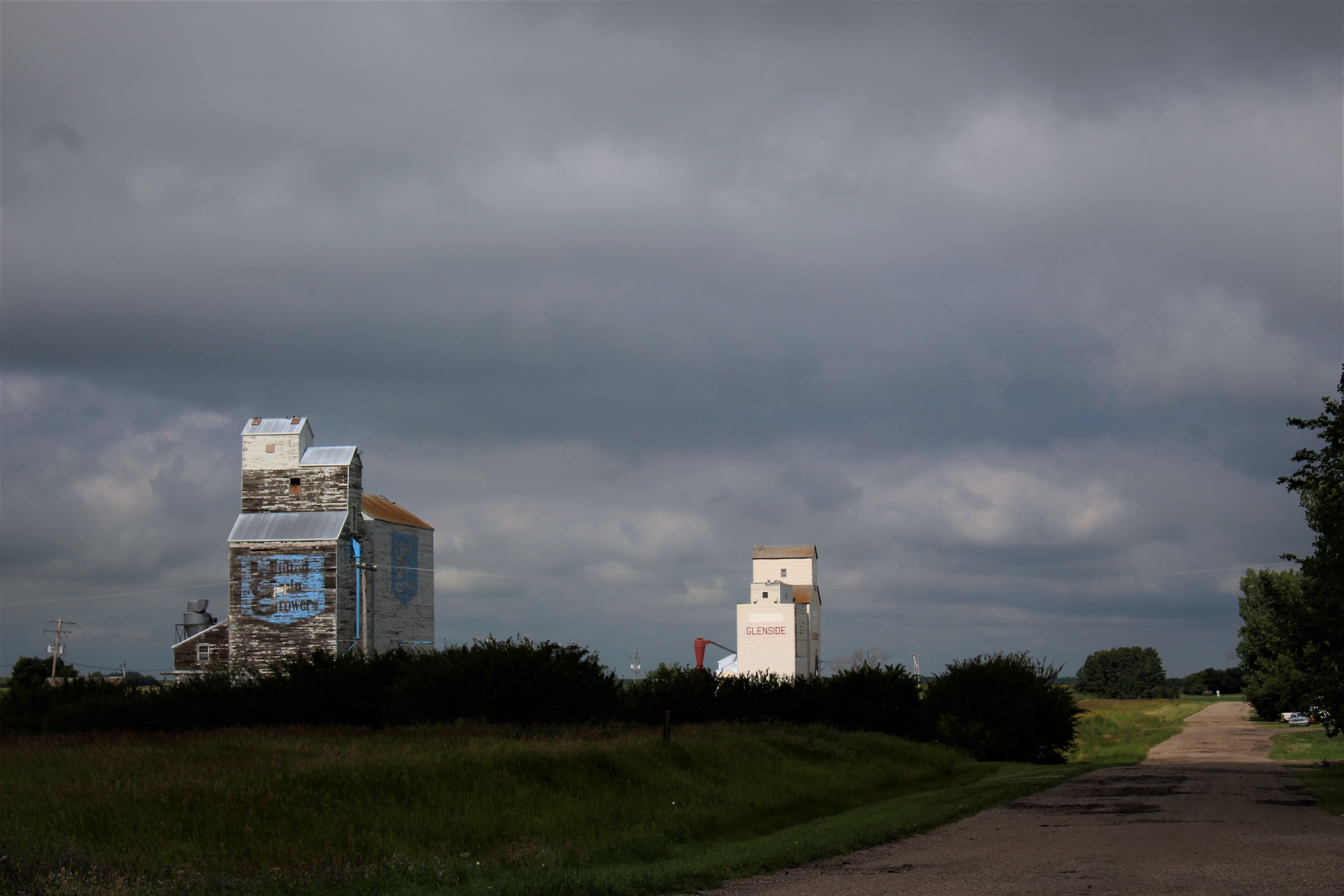
- Grain elevators in Glenside

- Location of Glenside in Saskatchewan Glenside (Canada)
- Coordinates: 51.451°N 106.831°W
- Country: Canada
- Province: Saskatchewan
- Region: West-central
- Census division: 11
- Rural municipality: Rudy No. 284

Government
  - Type: Municipal
  - Governing body: Glenside Village Council
  - Mayor: Kerry Greig
  - Administrator: Shannon Pederson
  - MP: Kelly Block
  - MLA: Jim Reiter

Area
  - Total: 0.77 km^{2} (0.30 sq mi)

Population (2016)
  - Total: 76
  - Density: 98.9/km^{2} (256/sq mi)
  - Dwellings: 23
- Time zone: UTC-6 (CST)
- Postal code: S0H 1T0
- Area code: 306
- Highways: Highway 219
- Railways: Canadian Pacific Railway (Abandoned)

Glenside (2016 population: 76) is a village in the Canadian province of Saskatchewan within the Rural Municipality of Rudy No. 284 and Census Division No. 11. The village is located on Highway 219 approximately 20 kilometres (12 mi) east of the town of Outlook.

== History ==
Glenside incorporated as a village on March 30, 1911.

== Demographics ==
Population history (1981–2016)
Year	Pop.	±%
1981	85	—
1986	92	+8.2%
1991	80	−13.0%
1996	69	−13.7%
2001	63	−8.7%
2006	86	+36.5%
2011	84	−2.3%
2016	76	−9.5%
Source: Statistics Canada via Saskatchewan Bureau of Statistics

In the 2021 Census of Population conducted by Statistics Canada, Glenside had a population of 73 living in 25 of its 28 total private dwellings, a change of −3.9% from its 2016 population of 76. With a land area of 0.78 km^{2} (0.30 sq mi), it had a population density of 93.6/km^{2} (242.4/sq mi) in 2021.

In the 2016 Census of Population, the Village of Glenside recorded a population of 76 living in 20 of its 23 total private dwellings, a −10.5% change from its 2011 population of 84. With a land area of 0.77 km^{2} (0.30 sq mi), it had a population density of 98.7/km^{2} (255.6/sq mi) in 2016.

== See also ==
- List of communities in Saskatchewan
- List of villages in Saskatchewan
