= Holmwood Sector =

- Sector
- Interactive map of Holmwood Sector
- Coordinates: 52°08′00″N 106°31′35″W
- Country: Canada
- Province: Saskatchewan
- City: Saskatoon
- Area code: 306

Holmwood Sector, previously known as Holmwood Suburban Development Area (SDA), is an area in Saskatoon, Saskatchewan, Canada. It is a part of the east side community of Saskatoon. It lies at the far east end of the city boundaries with the Rural Municipality of Corman Park No. 344. The area was annexed by the city on August 1, 2010 and the SDA development plan was approved on April 16, 2012. Land preparation worked started in 2012. Prior to development into a SDA the area was predominantly agricultural land and also housed the Sundown Drive-in that operated off Highway 5 (a.k.a. College Drive) from 1963.

The origin of the Holmwood name is unknown, but it is taken from Christopher J. Yorath's 1913 planning map, which showed potential locations for many communities; Yorath's proposed Holmwood was placed on the map roughly where the Holmwood Sector is situated now. It is not yet known whether the name Holmwood will actually be applied to any of the communities planned for the sector, although there is precedent with the Blairmore Sector, located on the opposite site of Saskatoon from Holmwood, applying its name to the Blairmore Urban Centre.

The development plan calls for a central suburban centre made up of mid-rise building and commercial development surrounded by multiple residential neighbourhoods. Residential development is expected to start on the far western side of the sector near the Canadian Pacific Railway tracks.

The layout for the first community within Holmwood, Brighton, was released by the City of Saskatoon on its zoning map dated June 9, 2014. Brighton is bordered by East College Park to the west, College Drive to the north, 8th Street to the south, and a realignment of McOrmond Drive (construction of which commenced in 2014) forming the eastern boundary.

== Education ==
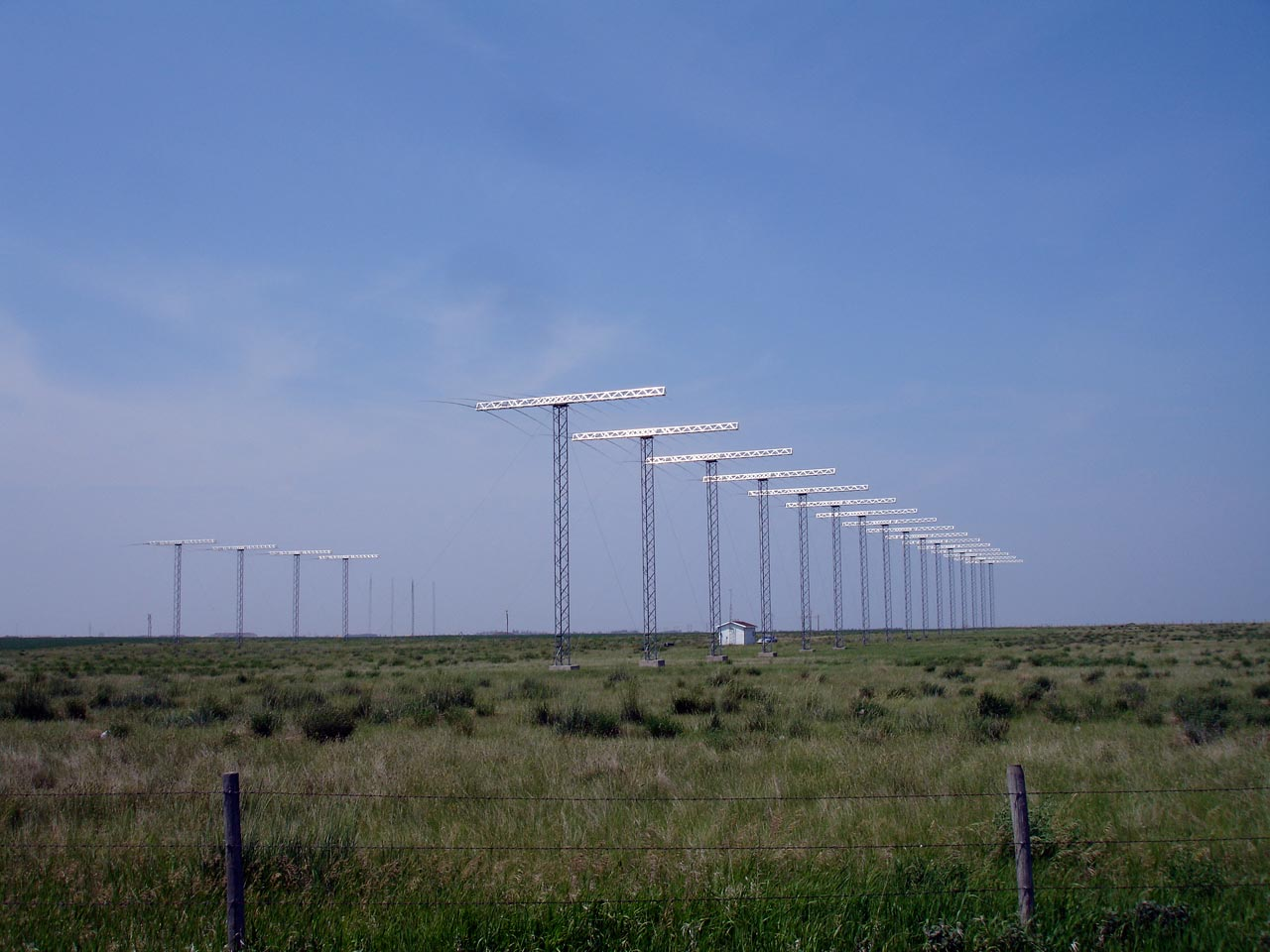
SuperDARN site.

The sector houses a University of Saskatchewan Kernen Prairie Experimental Farm. The experimental farm also hosts one of the sites for the Super Dual Auroral Radar Network. At present no community schools have been established, pending residential development.

== Transportation ==
Saskatchewan Highway 5 enters this north eastern sector of Saskatoon as College Drive. To the east Highway 5 runs to Humboldt, and Kamsack to the Manitoba border. Portions of a planned perimeter highway will pass through Holmwood. Overland routes into the area at present include 8th Street East, Zimmerman Road and McOrmond Drive, with 8th and McOrmond announced as being major routes for the region moving into the future (Zimmerman is on the planned alignment of the perimeter highway and thus will be removed in the future). The area is currently (2015) not served by city transit due to urban development not yet taking place.
