= Range road =

Type of road in Canada

A range road in Canada is a road that runs north–south along a range grid line of the Dominion Land Survey. Range roads (Rge. Rd. or RR) are perpendicular to township roads (Twp. Rd.) which run east–west along the township grid lines.

== Western Canada ==
In western Canada (especially rural areas in most municipal districts in Alberta), a range road (abbreviated "Rge. Rd." or "RR") is a road running on a north–south parallel to a range line (a line denoting the east and west boundaries of a 6-mile (9.7 km) × 6-mile legal township in the Dominion Land Survey and Alberta Township land surveying systems).

== Alberta ==
Range roads are commonly numbered in 1-mile (1.6 km) increments west from the east range line of a given township. The range roads form the east and west boundaries (known as section lines) of the 1 mile × 1 mile square sections – 36 of which comprise a township (e.g. Range Road 12-2 is between the second and third sections west of Range line 12, Range Road 6-0 is on range line 6). In many municipal districts, the dash between the range line number and the section line number is eliminated (Range Road 15-1 (151) might be called "Range Road one-fifty-one"). Where a road is offset from a section line, it is often appended with a letter (Range Road 11-1A is just west of the first section line west of Range line 11). This system is useful for finding farmsteads (assuming one knows the legal address of the parcel).

Range roads are perpendicular to township roads (abbreviated Twp. Rd.). In Foothills County, the range and township road naming system has been replaced with a more conventional "street/avenue" numbering scheme. Range roads are streets numbered west and east of the Fifth Meridian (Meridian Street) in increments of 16 streets to the mile. Township roads are avenues numbered on a similar grid to the city of Calgary (the boundary lies between 190th and 220th Avenue) and extends out to 722nd Avenue. This system causes confusion at the southern boundary of Calgary, as streets in Calgary are numbered east and west of Centre Street, which is some distance west of the Fifth Meridian. Therefore, street numbers change as one crosses Calgary's southern boundary.

== Saskatchewan ==
In Saskatchewan there are both township and range roads. The numbers of the range roads help to establish the location of the roads as they exist with relation to the legal land description survey system. Range roads travel north and south between the meridians. Range roads indicate first the meridian number. In Saskatchewan roads near the Manitoba border begin with 1 as they are west of the prime or first meridian, then the range numbers are west of the second and finally west of the 3rd meridian. There are no roads in Saskatchewan west of the fourth meridian, as the fourth meridian line defines the border between Alberta and Saskatchewan. The next two digits are the range number, which increments from east to west from a meridian line. The last range number shows how many miles within the range the road is located starting at the easternmost edge of the range and travelling west. As they mark a definite location such as a longitudes and latitudes, the naming convention is the same across Saskatchewan. Township and range roads can be gravel, highway, or municipal paved road. The Dominion Land Survey system designates a township road allowance every two miles apart south to north, and allows for a range road allowance every mile apart east to west.

Due to the curvature of the Earth, townships adjacent to major Meridian lines (e.g. the Fifth Meridian – 114° W) are truncated. There are more townships between meridian lines along the 49th Parallel (the boundary between Canada and the United States) than there are along the 60th Parallel (the boundary between Canada's southern provinces and northern territories).

== See also ==
- Concession road
- County highway
- Roads in Saskatchewan § Township roads and range roads
