= Chief Whitecap =

Dakota chief

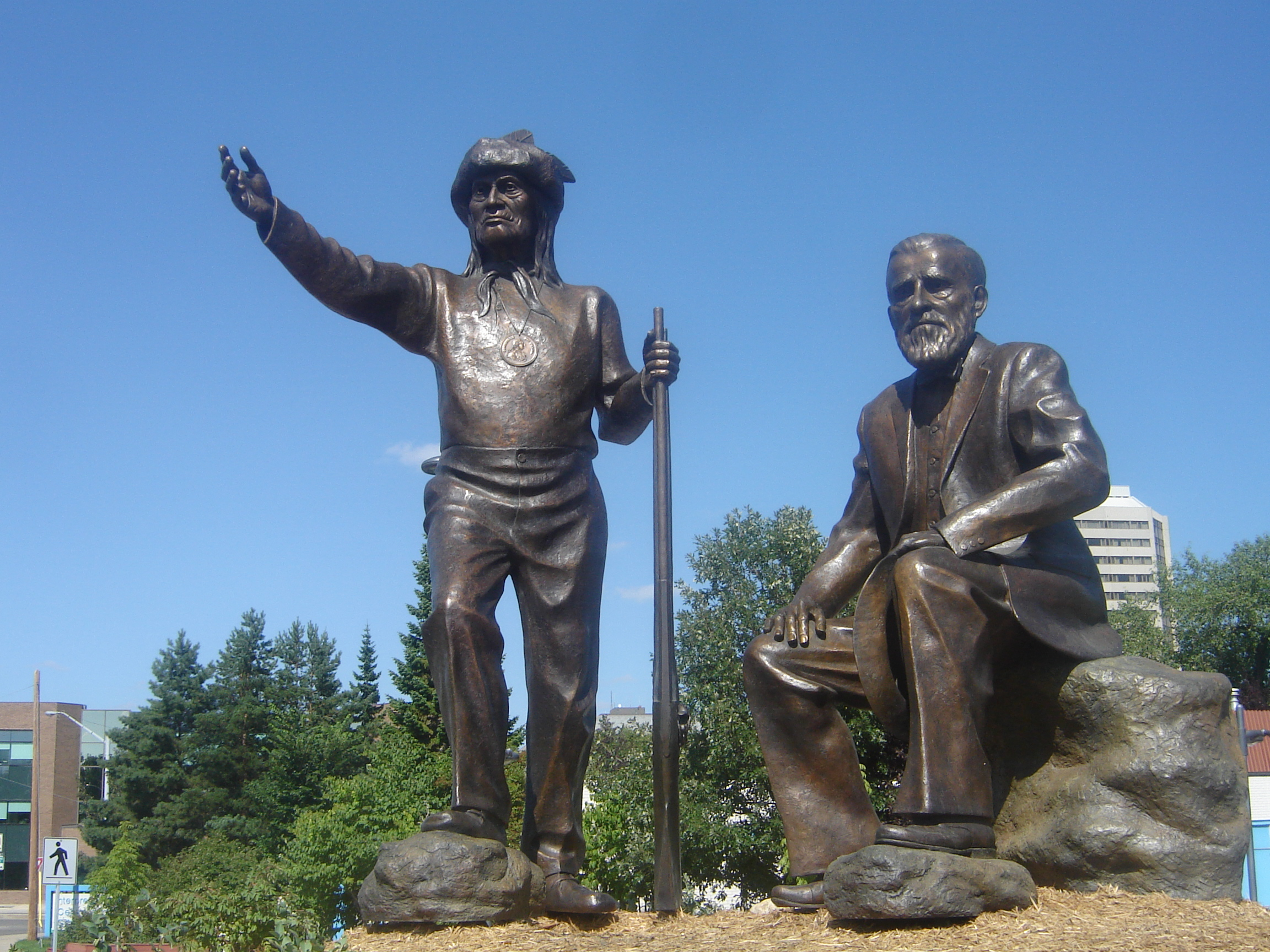
Statue of Chief Whitecap (standing) and John Neilson Lake (seated) in River Landing, Saskatoon

Chief Whitecap (fl. 1880s) (Dakota: Wápaha Ská), also known as Chief Wapahaska and Bonnet Blanc, was a Dakota chief from the area now known as Whitecap Dakota Reserve.

== Founding of Saskatoon ==
John Lake of the Temperance Colonization Society of Toronto arrived in what is now Saskatoon in 1882 to survey the land. Whitecap advised that Lake begin the settlement on the east bank of the South Saskatchewan River, which would later become Nutana.

== Later life ==
Whitecap was a participant in the North-West Rebellion, and was tried for treason after Louis Riel's surrender. He was later found not guilty.
