= Rural Municipality of Rudy No. 284 =

Rural municipality in Saskatchewan, Canada

Rudy No. 284
- Rural municipality
- Rural Municipality of Rudy No. 284
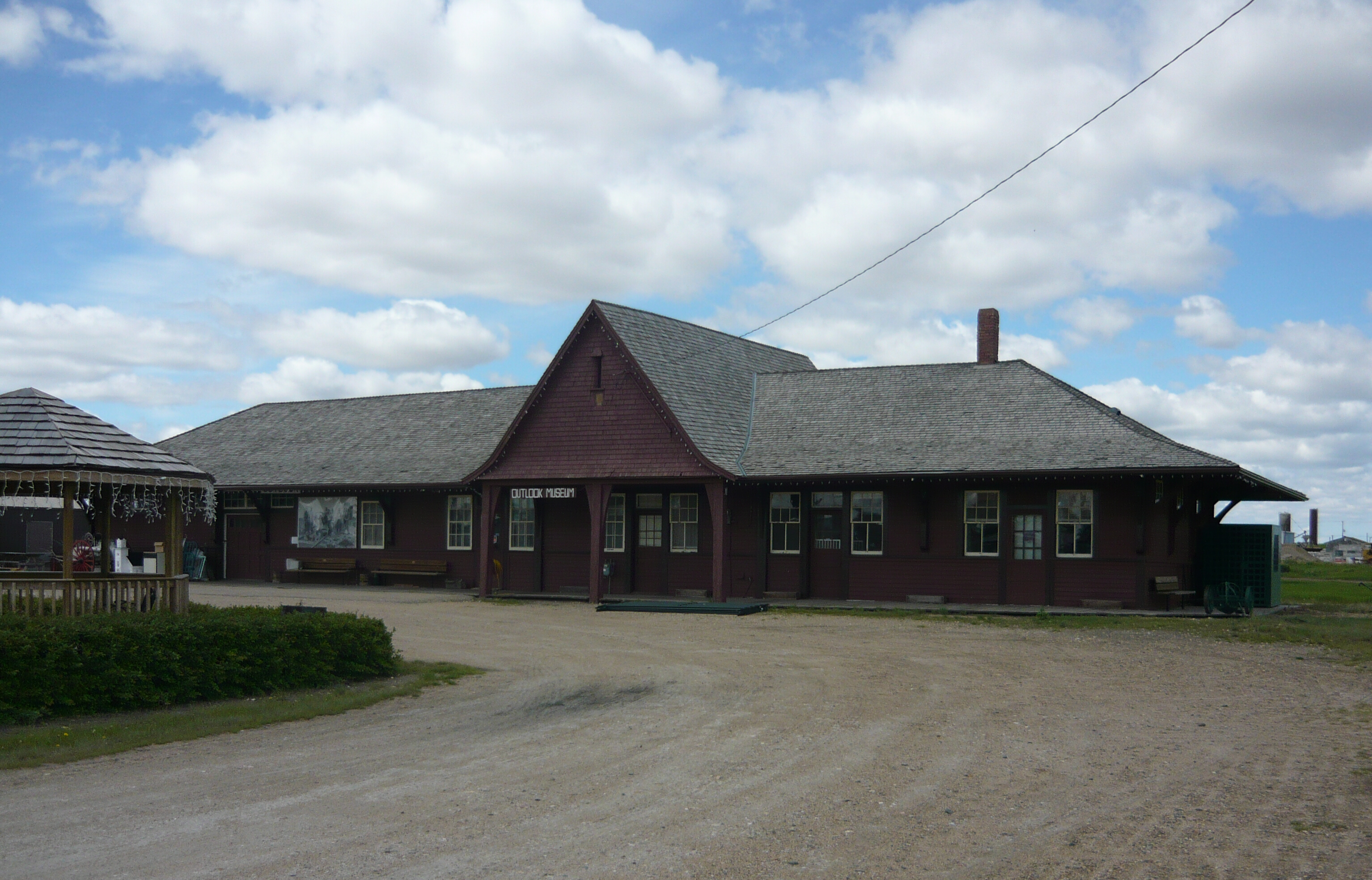
- Former CNR station in Outlook

- Location of the RM of Rudy No. 284 in Saskatchewan
- Coordinates: 51.517°N 106.966°W
- Country: Canada
- Province: Saskatchewan
- Census division: 11
- SARM division: 5
- Formed: December 13, 1909

Government
  - Reeve: Dennis Fuglerud
  - Governing body: RM of Rudy No. 284 Council
  - Administrator: Tina Douglas
  - Office location: Outlook

Area (2016)
  - Land: 813.86 km^{2} (314.23 sq mi)

Population (2016)
  - Total: 466
  - Density: 0.6/km^{2} (1.6/sq mi)
- Time zone: CST
  - Summer (DST): CST
- Area codes: 306 and 639
- Website: Official website

The Rural Municipality of Rudy No. 284 (2016 population: 466) is a rural municipality (RM) in the Canadian province of Saskatchewan within Census Division No. 11 and SARM Division No. 5.

== History ==
The RM of Rudy No. 284 incorporated as a rural municipality on December 13, 1909.

== Geography ==
=== Communities and localities ===
The following urban municipalities are surrounded by the RM.

Towns

- Outlook

Villages

- Broderick
- Glenside

== Demographics ==
Population history (1981–2016)
Year	Pop.	±%
1981	516	—
1986	447	−13.4%
1991	415	−7.2%
1996	428	+3.1%
2001	430	+0.5%
2006	434	+0.9%
2011	496	+14.3%
2016	466	−6.0%
Source: Statistics Canada via Saskatchewan Bureau of Statistics

In the 2021 Census of Population conducted by Statistics Canada, the RM of Rudy No. 284 had a population of 475 living in 159 of its 178 total private dwellings, a change of 1.9% from its 2016 population of 466. With a land area of 807.31 km^{2} (311.70 sq mi), it had a population density of 0.6/km^{2} (1.5/sq mi) in 2021.

In the 2016 Census of Population, the RM of Rudy No. 284 recorded a population of 466 living in 155 of its 169 total private dwellings, a −1.1% change from its 2011 population of 471. With a land area of 813.86 km^{2} (314.23 sq mi), it had a population density of 0.6/km^{2} (1.5/sq mi) in 2016.

== Attractions ==
- Broderick Reservoir
- Outlook & District Regional Park
- Outlook & District Heritage Museum

== Government ==
The RM of Rudy No. 284 is governed by an elected municipal council and an appointed administrator that meets on the second and fourth Wednesday of every month. The reeve of the RM is Dennis Fuglerud while its administrator is Tina Douglas. The RM's office is located in Outlook.

== Transportation ==
- Saskatchewan Highway 15
- Saskatchewan Highway 219
- Saskatchewan Highway 764
- Canadian Pacific Railway (abandoned)

== See also ==
- List of rural municipalities in Saskatchewan
