= Whitecap Dakota First Nation =

Native American tribal organization

- Band No. 94
- Wápaha Ská Dakhóta Oyáte
- People: Dakota
- Headquarters: Whitecap

Land
- Land area: 16.774 km^{2} (6.476 sq mi)

Population (2017)
- On reserve: 324
- On other land: 12
- Off reserve: 356
- Total population: 692

Government
- Chief: Darcy Bear
- Council size: 3

Tribal Council
- Saskatoon Tribal Council

Website
- https://www.whitecapdakota.com/en/index.aspx

Whitecap Dakota First Nation (Dakota: Wápaha Ská Dakhóta Oyáte) is a Dakota First Nations band government whose reserve is located 26 km (16 mi) south of Saskatoon, Saskatchewan, Canada. Governing the Whitecap Indian Reserve No. 94, historically referred to as the Moose Woods Sioux Reserve, it is bordered by the Rural Municipality of Dundurn No. 314 and located along Highway 219 between the South Saskatchewan River and CFAD Dundurn.

Chief Wapahaska (White Cap) and his band eventually settled along the South Saskatchewan River, and received a 16.774 km^{2} (6.476 sq mi) reserve in June 1881 despite not having signed a treaty. The First Nation has a registered population of 656 people as of March 2017; approximately 322 members of the First Nation live on-reserve and approximately 334 live off-reserve. The First Nation is led by Chief Darcy Bear and is affiliated with the Saskatoon Tribal Council.

The Dakota Dunes Casino is located on Whitecap Dakota First Nation.

== Whitecap, Saskatchewan ==
The unincorporated area of Whitecap is located within the Whitecap Dakota First Nation, located along Highway 219.
