= Grasswood =

Community in Saskatchewan, Canada

Coordinates: 52.032°N 106.384°W

Location of Grasswood in Saskatchewan

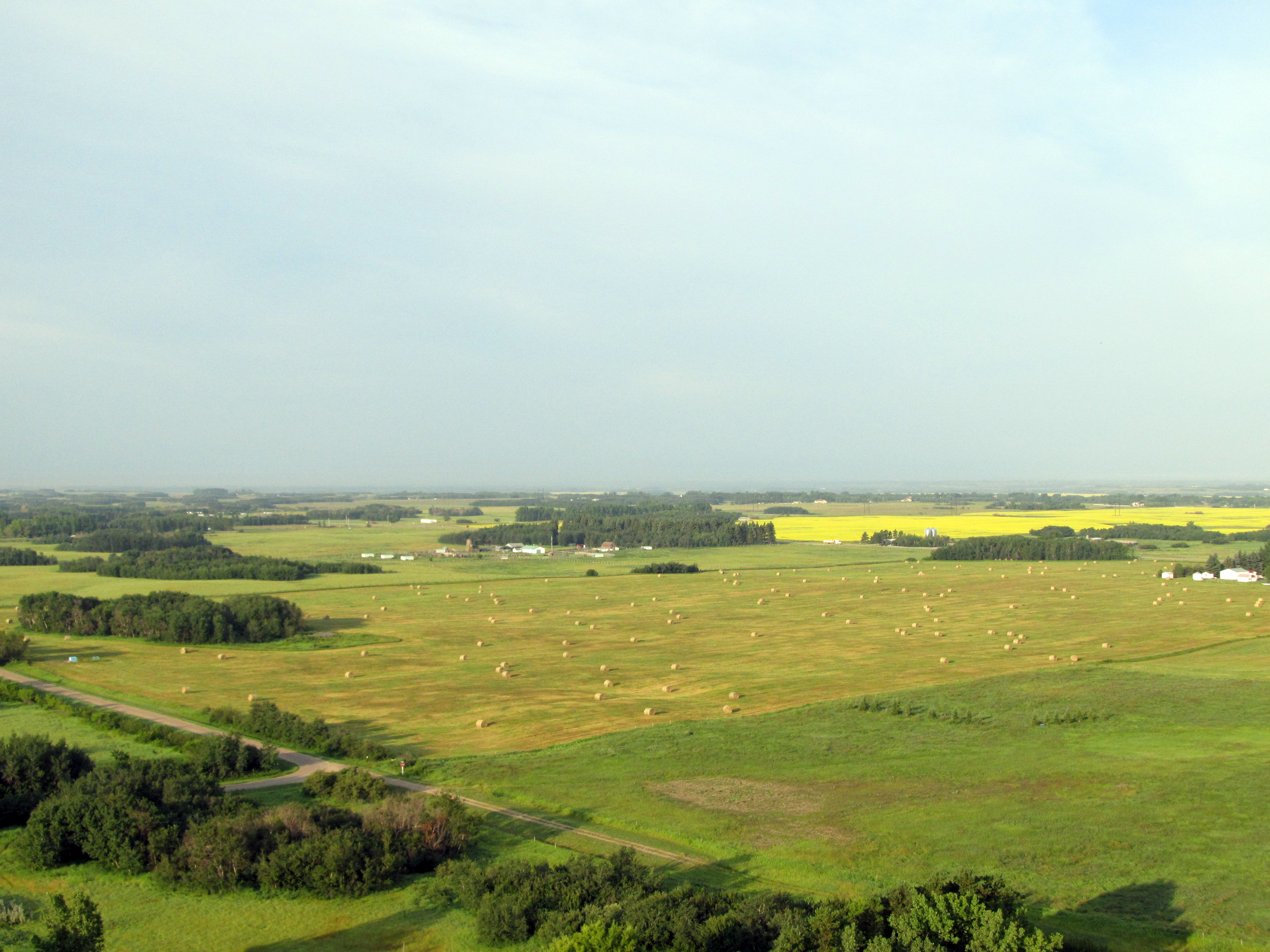
Aerial photograph of Grasswood taken from a hot air balloon

Grasswood, also known as Grasswood Park, is an unincorporated hamlet in Saskatchewan, Canada. It is part of the Rural Municipality of Corman Park No. 344 and is located just south of the city limits of Saskatoon. A second unincorporated hamlet, Furdale, is directly to the west.

The area comprises primarily residences and acreages, with a small commercial area on Highway 11, just outside Saskatoon. The bulk of the area's services are provided by the nearby city, with Highway 11, Clarence Avenue, and Lorne Avenue (Highway 219) providing direct access to Saskatoon (an additional access was provided via Preston Avenue until the 2010s when it was closed due to the Stonebridge residential development). Saskatoon's Animal Services facility is located in Grasswood.

Grasswood was declared an organized hamlet on March 6, 1992. At the request of its residents, it was reverted to hamlet status on January 1, 1999.

== See also ==
- List of hamlets in Saskatchewan
