= John Neilson Lake =

Canadian minister

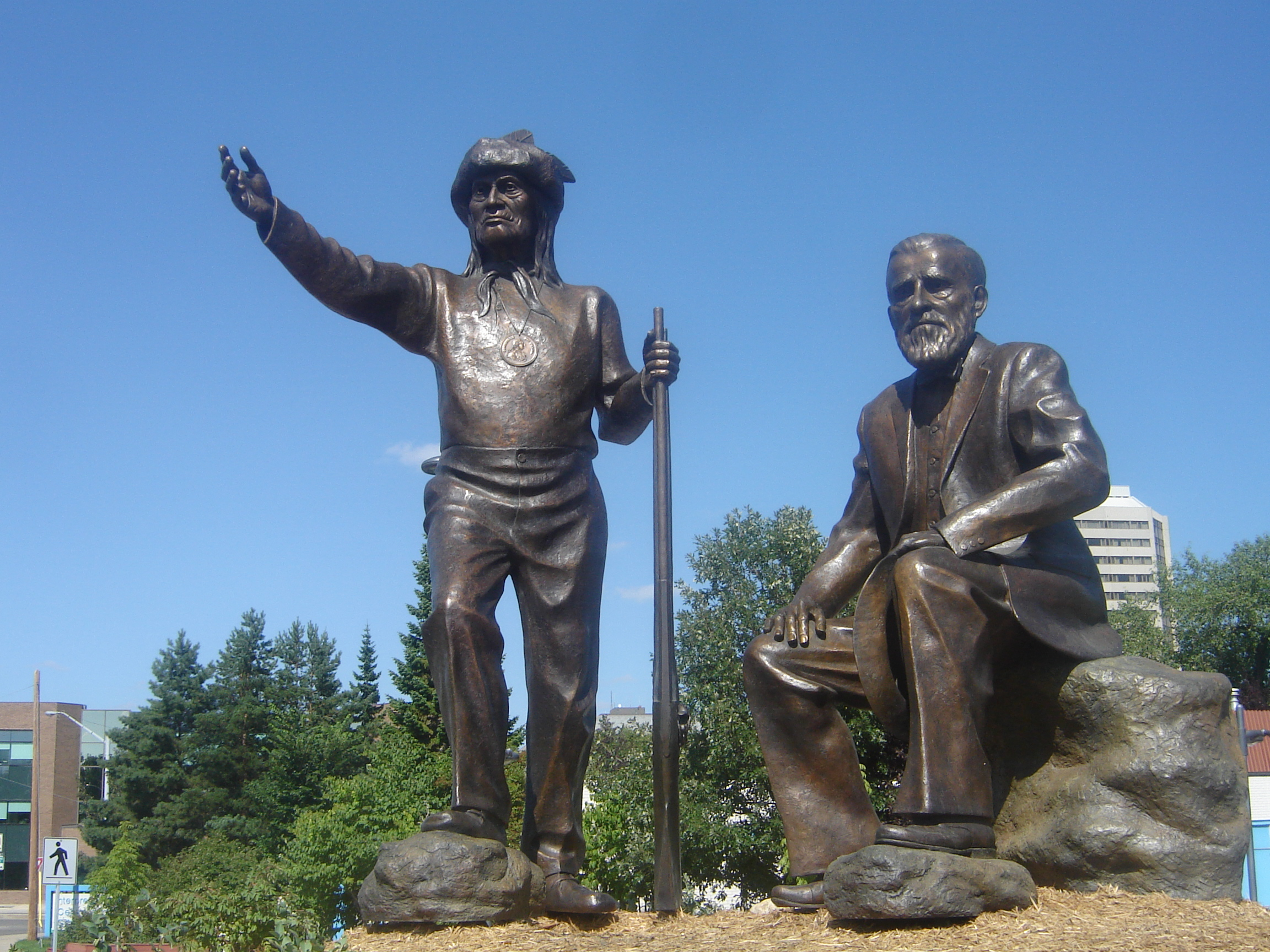
Statue of Chief Whitecap (standing) and John Neilson Lake (seated) in River Landing, Saskatoon

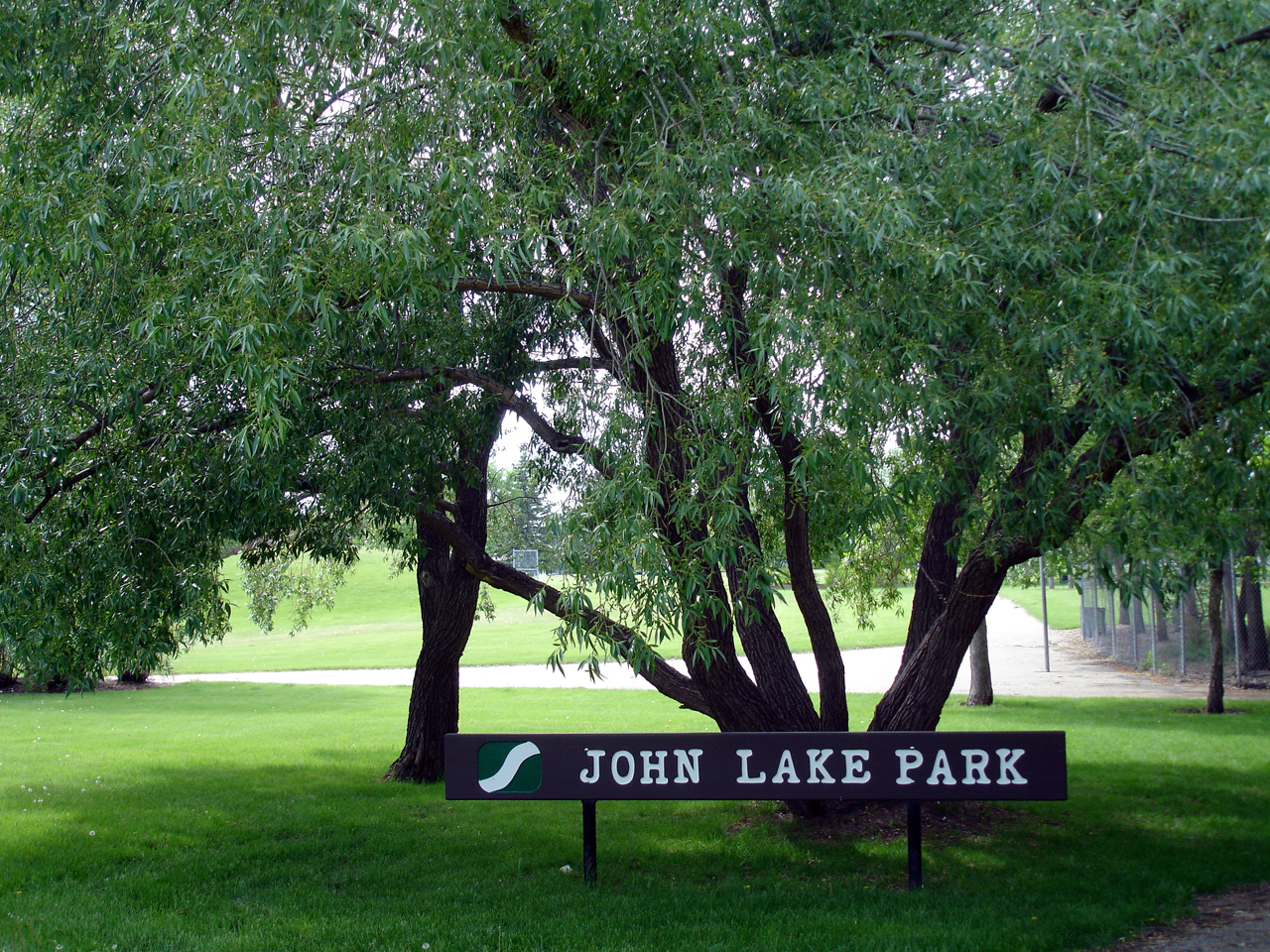
Park named after John Lake in Avalon, Saskatoon

John Neilson Lake (19 August 1834 in Ernestown, Ontario, Canada – 12 February 1925) was originally a preacher for the Methodist Church in Canada and eventually selected the site that became the city of Saskatoon, Saskatchewan, Canada. In 1881 Lake became the Commissioner of the Temperance Colonization Society of Toronto survey party that was formed to take advantage of a government land sale and established the colony. In 1882 Lake chose the site for the settlement that would eventually become the city of Saskatoon. He is sometimes referred to as the "father of Saskatoon".
