= Brighton, Saskatoon =

Brighton
- Neighbourhood
- Interactive map of Brighton
- Coordinates: 52°7′27″N 106°33′16″W
- Country: Canada
- Province: Saskatchewan
- City: Saskatoon
- Suburban Development Area: Holmwood
- Neighbourhood: Brighton
- Annexed: 2010
- Construction: 2016 - present

Government
  - Type: Municipal (Ward 8)
  - Administrative body: Saskatoon City Council
  - Councillor: Sarina Gersher

Area
  - Total: 3.51 km^{2} (1.36 sq mi)

Population
  - Average Income: $
- Time zone: UTC-6 (UTC)

Brighton is a neighbourhood in Saskatoon, Saskatchewan, and is the first of several communities planned for the Holmwood Suburban Development Area on the east side of the city. As of 2022, it is under construction.

The land where Brighton exists was annexed by the city from the surrounding rural municipality of Corman Park in 2010. The community is bordered by College Drive to the north, 8th Street East to the south, the neighbourhood of College Park East to the west and southwest and McOrmond Drive to the east (the roadway having been realigned for the purpose).

When completed, Brighton will be a primarily residential community, with some regional commercial development on its north (College Drive) and south (8th Street East) sides. As of 2018 the first commercial development at College and McOrmond is under way, with a movie theatre and other retail businesses joining some retail that predates the development of Brighton. Some office development already exists along 8th Street, again predating Brighton (and, indeed, the area's annexation), with increased construction expected in the near future.

The community will feature a "neighbourhood village", an area of mixed-use commercial buildings and public space. 55% of off-street parking will be underground, enclosed, covered or within permitted buildings.
