= Idylwyld Drive =

Street in Saskatoon, Saskatchewan, Canada

- Idylwyld Freeway (part)
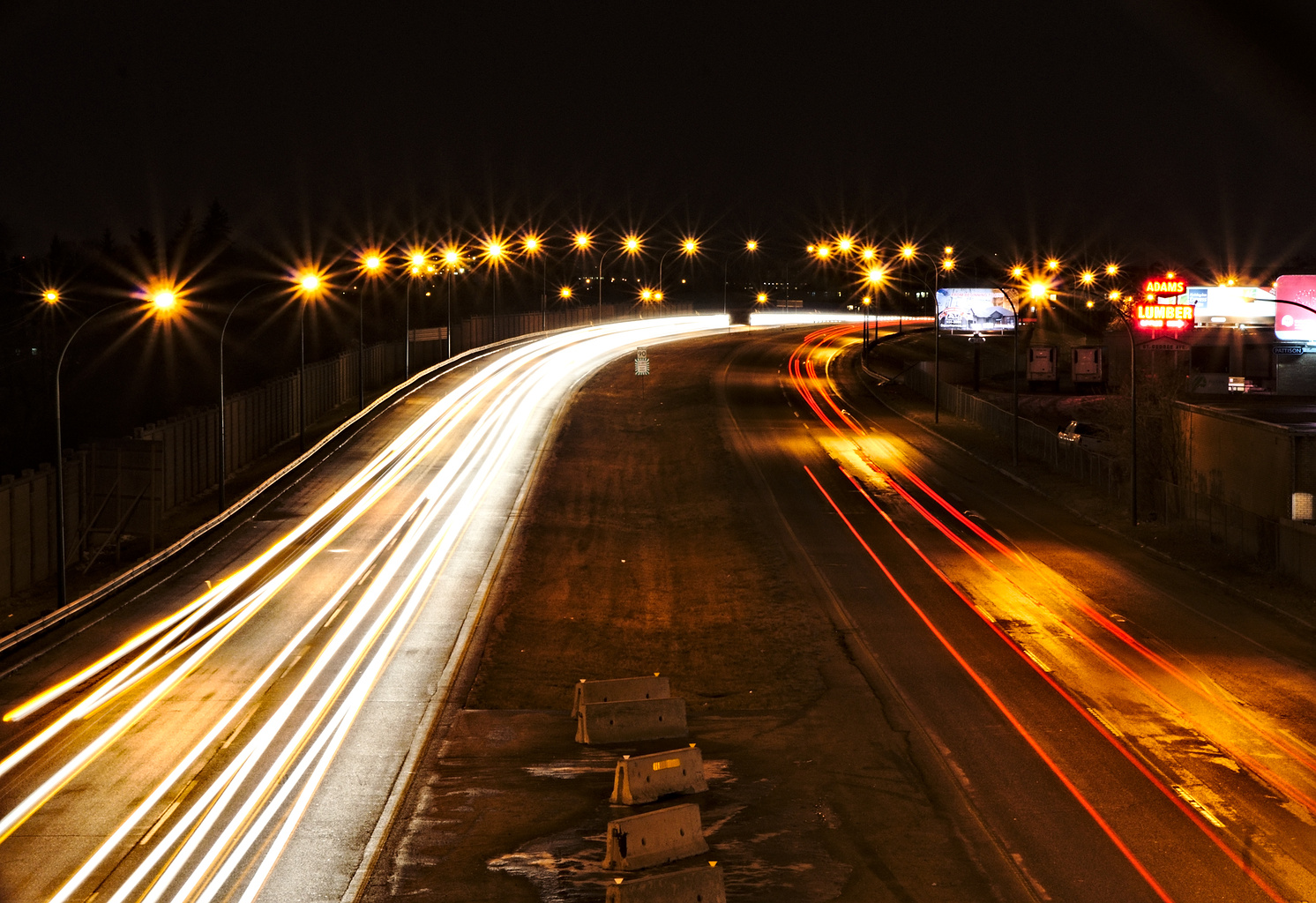
- Interactive map of Idylwyld Drive
- Former name: Avenue A
- Maintained by: City of Saskatoon
- Length: 8.46 km (5.26 mi)
- Location: Saskatoon
- Coordinates: 52°07′11″N 106°40′08″W
- South end: Circle Drive S
- Major junctions: 8th Street; 22nd Street; Circle Drive N Highway 16; Highway 11
- North end: 71st Street

Construction
- Inauguration: 1966

Idylwyld Drive (/ˈaɪdəlwaɪld/ EYE-del-wild) is an arterial road in Saskatoon, Saskatchewan. It is one of the main roads in and out of the downtown area of the city.

On the south side of the Senator Sid Buckwold Bridge, it is a freeway and was initially designated as the Idylwyld Freeway (since 2013, the southern portion of the road has also been designated as Idylwyld Drive). It merges into Circle Drive at an interchange completed in 2013. At its north end the road divides into two highways, Highway 11 and Highway 12.

The oldest section of Idylwyld Drive used to be known as Avenue A, the easternmost of the "lettered" north–south streets. In 1966, the Canadian National Railway tracks were relocated out of the downtown; the former railway bridge was demolished and replaced by a traffic bridge; and the former railroad right-of-way south of the river was made into the Idylwyld Freeway. The freeway crossed the river at the bridge and connected at 20th Street to Avenue A, renamed Idylwyld Drive. Two blocks of Avenue A still exist south of 20th Street, as a small remnant.

As with the city's other major transitional arterials, 22nd Street West and 8th Street East, Idylwyld Drive features a mixture of uses. At its southern end, on the border of the Central Business District and Riversdale business areas, commercial uses dominate. North of 25th Street, residential dominates the west side of the street, with a mix of hotels, motels, schools and institutional uses, including the Saskatoon campus of Saskatchewan Polytechnic (formerly called SIAST Kelsey Campus). North of 33rd Street, a mix of single-family residential and commercial is featured until approximately 36th Street, at which point the road becomes a commercial district. North of Circle Drive, the street elevates to freeway status and passes through suburban commercial and industrial regions until it exits the city.

Beginning with its intersection with 20th Street and continuing north to the city limits, Idylwyld Drive serves as the dividing line for designating "East" and "West" addresses for the west side of Saskatoon (the remnant of Avenue A serves the same purpose south of 20th).

Idylwyld Drive is the official designation of Highway 11 through Saskatoon, as well as 2.5-kilometre (1.6 mi) portion of Highway 16 on the city's north side; however, Highway 11 is signed to bypass central and southern portions of Idylwyld Drive in favour of Circle Drive despite its official designation.

== Exits and intersections ==
The entire route is in Saskatoon. All exits are unnumbered.

km	mi	Destinations	Notes
0.0	0.0	Circle Drive (Highway 11 south) to Highway 16 east – Yorkton, Regina; Lorne Avenue (Highway 219 south)	No direct access from Circle Drive east; south end of Idylwyld Freeway; Highway 11 officially follows Circle Drive east
1.2	0.75	Ruth Street	Four ramps together form a complete interchange; access via Adelaide Street, St. George Avenue, and Vernon Avenue; alternate access to Lorne Avenue
2.1	1.3	Taylor Street	Northbound entrance only
3.2	2.0	8th Street / Lorne Avenue	Southbound exit and northbound entrance
3.9	2.4	Senator Sid Buckwold Bridge over South Saskatchewan River	
4.0	2.5	1st Avenue – City Centre	Northbound exit and southbound entrance
4.3	2.7	Avenue A (to 19th Street)	Southbound exit only
4.4	2.7	20th Street	At grade; north end of Idylwyld Freeway
4.7	2.9	22nd Street / Highway 7 west / Highway 14 west – Rosetown, Biggar	Highway 7 / Highway 14 eastern terminus
5.0	3.1	Jamieson Street W / 23rd Street E	Former Highway 5 east
5.2	3.2	25th Street E (Highway 5 east) – Humboldt	Highway 5 western terminus
5.9	3.7	31st Street	Access to Saskatchewan Polytechnic (formerly SIAST Kelsey Campus)
6.4	4.0	33rd Street	
7.9	4.9	Circle Drive (Highway 11 south / Highway 16 east) – Airport	Diamond interchange; south end of Highway 16 concurrency
9.2	5.7	Avenue C south / 51st Street east – Airport	Parclo A4 interchange
10.4	6.5	Highway 16 (TCH/YH) west – The Battlefords	Interchange; northbound exit and southbound entrance; north end of Highway 16 concurrency
12.0	7.5	Marquis Drive	Southbound access to Highway 16 west
12.8	8.0	71st Street (Auction Mart Road)	
13.0	8.1	Highway 11 north – Warman, Prince Albert Highway 12 north – Martensville, Blaine Lake	Interchange; northbound exit and southbound entrance; north end of Highway 11 concurrency; continues as Highway 12
1.000 mi = 1.609 km; 1.000 km = 0.621 mi: Concurrency terminus; Incomplete access
