= Dakota Dunes Casino =

Casino in Whitecap, Saskatchewan, Canada

Dakota Dunes Resort & Casino
- Interactive map of Dakota Dunes Resort & Casino
- Location: Whitecap, Saskatchewan, Canada; 204 Dakota Dunes Way; 51.8903°N 106.7039°W
- Opened: August 2007
- Casino type: Land
- Owner: Saskatchewan Indian Gaming Authority
- Website: www.dakotadunescasino.com

Dakota Dunes Resort & Casino is a First Nations casino situated on Whitecap Dakota First Nation land south of Saskatoon along Saskatchewan Highway 219. The 84,000 sq. ft facility opened in 2007, and includes a casino, restaurant, multi-purpose rooms, and an 18-hole golf course.

In September 2018, construction began on a new $38 million, 155-room hotel on the resort site, which opened as the Dakota Dunes Resort in October 2020.

== Teepee of Light ==
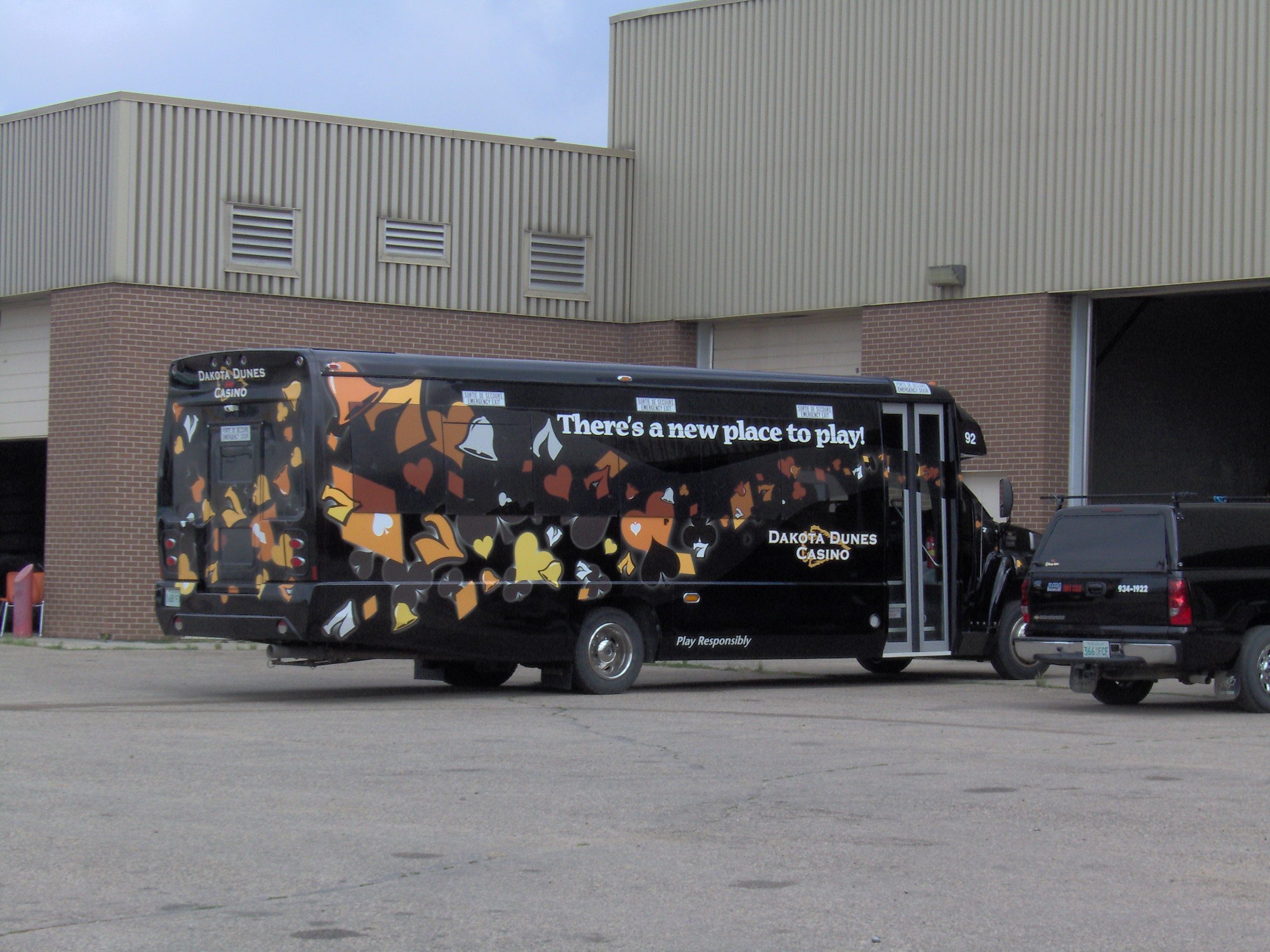
A Dakota Dunes Casino shuttle bus.

The Teepee of Light consists of seven 4000-watt spot lights that at night project into the night sky to form a light effect in the shape of a teepee.

== Dakota Dunes Golf Links ==
The 18 hole golf course opened to the public on April 30, 2004. The golf course was designed by Graham Cooke. It hosted the SIGA Dakota Dunes Open on PGA Tour Canada from 2008 to 2016.

== See also ==
- List of casinos in Canada
- List of golf courses in Saskatchewan
