= 30th Saskatchewan Legislature =

- Majority parliament
- Nov. 25, 2024 – present

Parliament leaders
- Premier: Scott Moe; Feb. 2, 2018 – present
- Leader of the Opposition: Carla Beck; Jun. 26, 2022 – present

Party caucuses
- Government: Saskatchewan Party
- Opposition: New Democratic Party
- Members: 61 MLA seats

Sovereign
- Monarch: Charles III; Sep. 8, 2022 – present
- Lieutenant governor: Russell Mirasty; Jul. 8, 2019 – Jan. 31, 2025
- Bernadette McIntyre; Jan. 31, 2025 – present
← 29th	→ 31st

The 30th Saskatchewan Legislature was elected at the province's 2024 general election, held on 28 October.

== Members ==
Riding	Name	Party	First elected / previously elected	No.# of term(s)	Notes
Athabasca	Leroy Laliberte	New Democratic Party	2024	1st term	
Batoche	Darlene Rowden	Saskatchewan Party	2024	1st term	
Cannington	**Daryl Harrison**	Saskatchewan Party	2020	2nd term	
Canora-Pelly	Sean Wilson	Saskatchewan Party	2024	1st term	
Carrot River Valley	Terri Bromm	Saskatchewan Party	2024	1st term	
Cumberland	Jordan McPhail	New Democratic Party	2024	1st term	
Cut Knife-Turtleford	James Thorsteinson	Saskatchewan Party	2024	1st term	
Cypress Hills	Doug Steele	Saskatchewan Party	2016	3rd term	
Dakota-Arm River	Barret Kropf	Saskatchewan Party	2024	1st term	
Estevan-Big Muddy	**Lori Carr**	Saskatchewan Party	2016	3rd term	
Humboldt-Watrous	Racquel Hilbert	Saskatchewan Party	2024	1st term	
Kelvington-Wadena	Chris Beaudry	Saskatchewan Party	2024	1st term	
Kindersley-Biggar	Kim Gartner	Saskatchewan Party	2024	1st term	
Last Mountain-Touchwood	**Travis Keisig**	Saskatchewan Party	2020	2nd term	
Lloydminster	Colleen Young	Saskatchewan Party	2014	4th term	
Lumsden-Morse	Blaine McLeod	Saskatchewan Party	2023	2nd term	
Martensville-Blairmore	Jamie Martens	Saskatchewan Party	2024	1st term	
Meadow Lake	**Jeremy Harrison**	Saskatchewan Party	2007	5th term	
Melfort	Todd Goudy^{†}	Saskatchewan Party	2018	3rd term	
Melville-Saltcoats	**Warren Kaeding**	Saskatchewan Party	2016	3rd term	
Moose Jaw North	**Tim McLeod**	Saskatchewan Party	2020	2nd term	
Moose Jaw Wakamow	Megan Patterson	Saskatchewan Party	2024	1st term	
Moosomin-Montmartre	Kevin Weedmark	Saskatchewan Party	2024	1st term	
Prince Albert Carlton	Kevin Kasun	Saskatchewan Party	2024	1st term	
Prince Albert Northcote	**Alana Ross**	Saskatchewan Party	2020	2nd term	
Regina Coronation Park	Noor Burki	New Democratic Party	2023	2nd term	
Regina Douglas Park	Nicole Sarauer	New Democratic Party	2016	3rd term	
Regina Elphinstone-Centre	Meara Conway	New Democratic Party	2020	2nd term	
Regina Lakeview	Carla Beck	New Democratic Party	2016	3rd term	
Regina Mount Royal	Trent Wotherspoon	New Democratic Party	2007	5th term	
Regina Northeast	Jacqueline Roy	New Democratic Party	2024	1st term	
Regina Pasqua	Bhajan Brar	New Democratic Party	2024	1st term	
Regina Rochdale	Joan Pratchler	New Democratic Party	2024	1st term	
Regina South Albert	Aleana Young	New Democratic Party	2020	2nd term	
Regina University	Sally Housser	New Democratic Party	2024	1st term	
Regina Walsh Acres	Jared Clarke	New Democratic Party	2023	2nd term	
Regina Wascana Plains	Brent Blakley	New Democratic Party	2024	1st term	
Rosetown-Delisle	**Jim Reiter**	Saskatchewan Party	2007	5th term	
Rosthern-Shellbrook	**Scott Moe**	Saskatchewan Party	2011	4th term	
Saskatchewan Rivers	**Eric Schmalz**	Saskatchewan Party	2024	1st term	
Saskatoon Centre	Betty Nippi-Albright	New Democratic Party	2020	2nd term	
Saskatoon Centre	Betty Nippi-Albright	Independent	2020	2nd term	
Saskatoon Chief Mistawasis	Don McBean	New Democratic Party	2024	1st term	
Saskatoon Churchill-Wildwood	Keith Jorgenson	New Democratic Party	2024	1st term	
Saskatoon Eastview	Matt Love	New Democratic Party	2020	2nd term	
Saskatoon Fairview	Vicki Mowat	New Democratic Party	2017	3rd term	
Saskatoon Meewasin	Nathaniel Teed	New Democratic Party	2022	2nd term	
Saskatoon Nutana	Erika Ritchie	New Democratic Party	2020	2nd term	
Saskatoon Riversdale	Kim Breckner	New Democratic Party	2024	1st term	
Saskatoon Silverspring	Hugh Gordon	New Democratic Party	2024	1st term	
Saskatoon Southeast	Brittney Senger	New Democratic Party	2024	1st term	
Saskatoon Stonebridge	Darcy Warrington	New Democratic Party	2024	1st term	
Saskatoon University-Sutherland	Tajinder Grewal	New Democratic Party	2024	1st term	
Saskatoon Westview	April ChiefCalf	New Democratic Party	2024	1st term	
Saskatoon Willowgrove	**Ken Cheveldayoff**	Saskatchewan Party	2003	6th term	
Swift Current	**Everett Hindley**	Saskatchewan Party	2018	3rd term	
The Battlefords	**Jeremy Cockrill**	Saskatchewan Party	2020	2nd term	
Warman	**Terry Jenson**	Saskatchewan Party	2020	2nd term	
Weyburn-Bengough	Michael Weger	Saskatchewan Party	2024	1st term	
White City-Qu'appelle	Brad Crassweller	Saskatchewan Party	2024	1st term	
Wood River	**David Marit**	Saskatchewan Party	2016	3rd term	
Yorkton	David Chan	Saskatchewan Party	2024	1st term	

- Member in **bold italic** is the Premier of Saskatchewan.
- Members in **bold** are in the Cabinet of Saskatchewan.
- Members in italic are Leaders of the respective parties.
- Member with ^{†} denotes the Speaker of the Assembly.
- Members with ‡ are Legislative Secretaries to Cabinet Ministers.
