= 28th Saskatchewan Legislature =

- Majority parliament
- May 17, 2016 – September 29, 2020

Parliament leaders
- Premier: Brad Wall; November 21, 2007 - February 2, 2018
- Scott Moe; February 2, 2018 - present

Legislative Assembly
- Speaker of the Assembly: Corey Tochor; May 17, 2016 - January 5, 2018
- Mark Docherty; March 12, 2018 - November 30, 2020
- Government House Leader: Paul Merriman; August 23, 2016 - August 30, 2017
- Greg Brkich; August 30, 2017 - August 13, 2019
- Jeremy Harrison; August 13, 2019 - present
- Opposition House Leader: Warren McCall; September 1, 2013 - March 7, 2018
- Nicole Sarauer; March 7, 2018 - June 1, 2019
- Cathy Sproule; June 1, 2019 - September 29, 2020
- Members: 61 MLA seats

Sovereign
- Monarch: Elizabeth II; February 6, 1952 - September 8, 2022
- Lieutenant Governor: Vaughn Solomon Schofield; March 22, 2012 - March 21, 2018
- W. Thomas Molloy; March 21, 2018 - July 2, 2019
- Russell Mirasty; July 18, 2019 - January 31, 2025

Sessions
- 1st session May 17, 2016 – October 25, 2017
- 2nd session October 25, 2017 – October 24, 2018
- 3rd session October 24, 2018 – October 23, 2019
- 4th session October 23, 2019 – September 29, 2020
← 27th	→ 29th

The 28th Saskatchewan Legislature was elected in the 2016 Saskatchewan election. It is controlled by the Saskatchewan Party first under Premier Brad Wall and later by Scott Moe.

== Members ==
Name	Party	Riding	First elected / previously elected	No.# of term(s)
Greg Brkich	SK Party	Arm River	1999	5th term
Buckley Belanger	NDP	Athabasca	1995 (Note: First elected as a Liberal)	6th term
Delbert Kirsch	SK Party	Batoche	2003	4th term
Randy Weekes	SK Party	Biggar-Sask Valley	1999	5th term
Dan D'Autremont	SK Party	Cannington	1991 (Note: First elected as a Progressive Conservative)	7th term
Terry Dennis	SK Party	Canora-Pelly	2016	1st term
Fred Bradshaw	SK Party	Carrot River Valley	2007	3rd term
Doyle Vermette	NDP	Cumberland	2008	3rd term
Larry Doke	SK Party	Cut Knife-Turtleford	2011	2nd term
Doug Steele	SK Party	Cypress Hills	2016	1st term
Lori Carr	SK Party	Estevan	2016	1st term
Donna Harpauer	SK Party	Humboldt-Watrous	1999	5th term
Don McMorris	SK Party	Indian Head-Milestone	1999	5th term
Hugh Nerlien	SK Party	Kelvington-Wadena	2016	1st term
Bill Boyd (resigned September 1, 2017)	SK Party	Kindersley	1991, 2007	6th term*
Ken Francis (elected March 1, 2018)	SK Party	Kindersley	2018	1st term
Glen Hart	SK Party	Last Mountain-Touchwood	1999	5th term
Colleen Young	SK Party	Lloydminster	2014	2nd term
Lyle Stewart	SK Party	Lumsden-Morse	1999	5th term
Nancy Heppner	SK Party	Martensville-Warman	2007	3rd term
Jeremy Harrison	SK Party	Meadow Lake	2007	3rd term
Kevin Phillips (died November 13, 2017)	SK Party	Melfort	2011	2nd term
Todd Goudy (elected March 1, 2018)	SK Party	Melfort	2018	1st term
Warren Kaeding	SK Party	Melville-Saltcoats	2016	1st term
Warren Michelson	SK Party	Moose Jaw North	2007	3rd term
Greg Lawrence	SK Party	Moose Jaw Wakamow	2011	2nd term
Steven Bonk	SK Party	Moosomin	2016	1st term
Joe Hargrave	SK Party	Prince Albert Carlton	2016	1st term
Nicole Rancourt	NDP	Prince Albert Northcote	2016	1st term
Mark Docherty	SK Party	Regina Coronation Park	2011	2nd term
Nicole Sarauer	NDP	Regina Douglas Park	2016	1st term
Warren McCall	NDP	Regina Elphinstone-Centre	2001	5th term
Gene Makowsky	SK Party	Regina Gardiner Park	2011	2nd term
Carla Beck	NDP	Regina Lakeview	2016	1st term
Kevin Doherty (resigned March 2, 2018)	SK Party	Regina Northeast	2011	2nd term
Yens Pedersen (elected September 12, 2018)	NDP	Regina Northeast	2018	1st term
Muhammad Fiaz	SK Party	Regina Pasqua	2016	1st term
Laura Ross	SK Party	Regina Rochdale	2007	3rd term
Trent Wotherspoon	NDP	Regina Rosemont	2007	3rd term
Tina Beaudry-Mellor	SK Party	Regina University	2016	1st term
Warren Steinley (resigned September 11, 2019)	SK Party	Regina Walsh Acres	2011	2nd term
Christine Tell	SK Party	Regina Wascana Plains	2007	3rd term
Jim Reiter	SK Party	Rosetown-Elrose	2007	3rd term
Scott Moe	SK Party	Rosthern-Shellbrook	2011	2nd term
Nadine Wilson	SK Party	Saskatchewan Rivers	2007	3rd term
David Forbes	NDP	Saskatoon Centre	2001	5th term
Lisa Lambert	SK Party	Saskatoon Churchill-Wildwood	2016	1st term
Corey Tochor (resigned September 11, 2019)	SK Party	Saskatoon Eastview	2011	2nd term
Jennifer Campeau (resigned July 2, 2017)	SK Party	Saskatoon Fairview	2011	2nd term
Vicki Mowat (elected September 7, 2017)	NDP	Saskatoon Fairview	2017	1st term
Roger Parent (died November 29, 2016)	SK Party	Saskatoon Meewasin	2011	2nd term
Ryan Meili (elected March 2, 2017)	NDP	Saskatoon Meewasin	2017	1st term
Gordon Wyant	SK Party	Saskatoon Northwest	2010	3rd term
Cathy Sproule	NDP	Saskatoon Nutana	2011	2nd term
Danielle Chartier	NDP	Saskatoon Riversdale	2009	3rd term
Paul Merriman	SK Party	Saskatoon Silverspring-Sutherland	2011	2nd term
Don Morgan	SK Party	Saskatoon Southeast	2003	4th term
Bronwyn Eyre	SK Party	Saskatoon Stonebridge-Dakota	2016	1st term
Eric Olauson	SK Party	Saskatoon University	2016	1st term
David Buckingham	SK Party	Saskatoon Westview	2016	1st term
Ken Cheveldayoff	SK Party	Saskatoon Willowgrove	2003	4th term
Brad Wall (resigned February 2, 2018)	SK Party	Swift Current	1999	5th term
Everett Hindley (elected March 1, 2018)	SK Party	Swift Current	2018	1st term
Herb Cox	SK Party	The Battlefords	2011	2nd term
Dustin Duncan	SK Party	Weyburn-Big Muddy	2006	4th term
Dave Marit	SK Party	Wood River	2016	1st term
Greg Ottenbreit	SK Party	Yorkton	2007	3rd term
