= 2018 Saskatchewan New Democratic Party leadership election =

- March 3, 2018
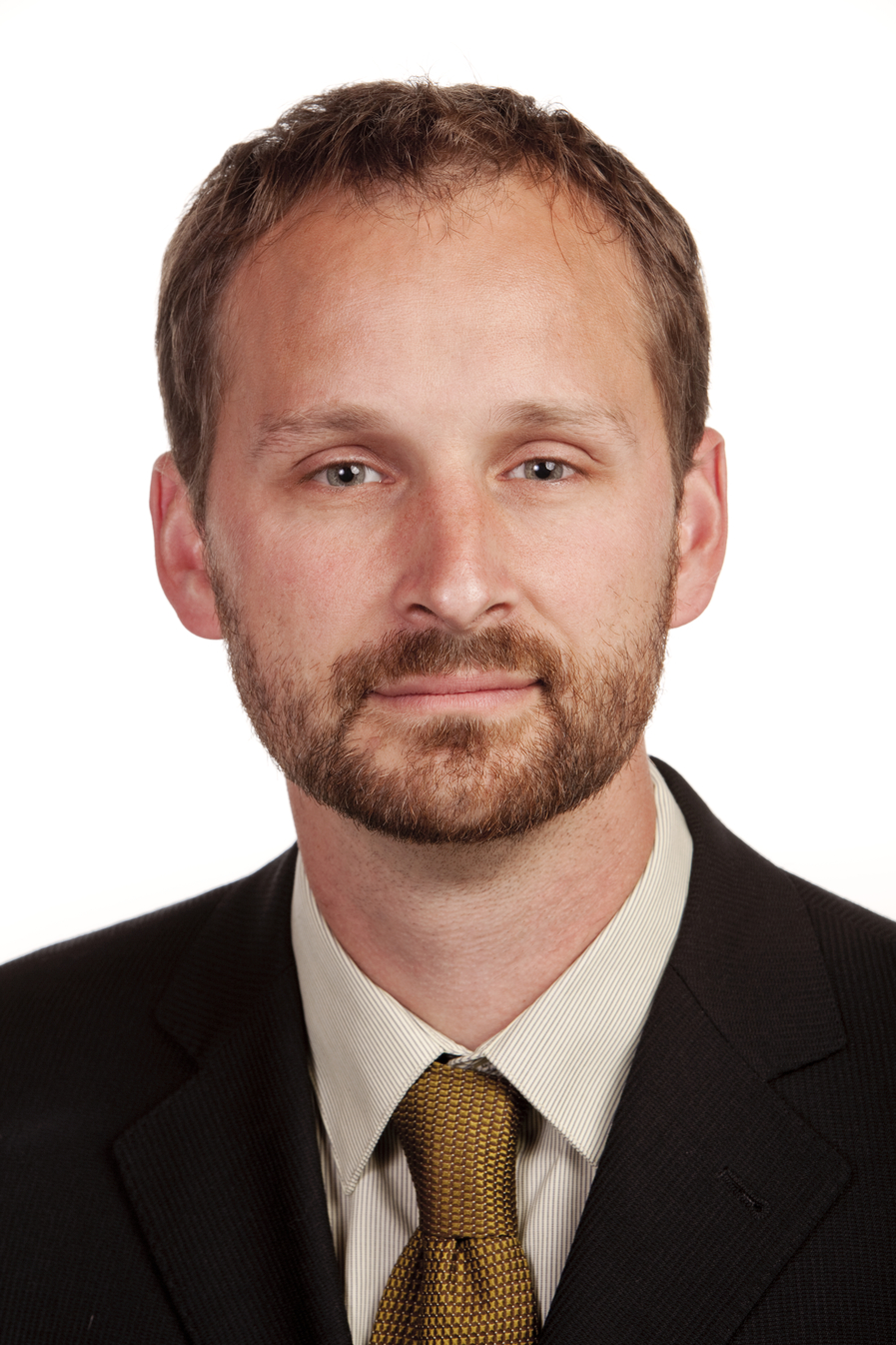
		TW
Candidate	Ryan Meili	Trent Wotherspoon
Popular vote	5,973	4,860
Percentage	55.14%	44.86%
Leader before election
Cam Broten
Elected Leader
Ryan Meili

2018 Saskatchewan New Democratic Party leadership election
- Date: March 3, 2018
- Convention: Delta Hotel, Regina
- Resigning leader: Cam Broten
- Won by: Ryan Meili
- Ballots: 1
- Candidates: 2
- Entrance fee: $4,000
- Spending limit: $200,000

An election for the leadership of the Saskatchewan New Democratic Party was held on March 3, 2018, as a result of the resignation of Cam Broten after losing the seat he contested in the 2016 election. Ryan Meili was chosen leader.

== Rules ==
All Saskatchewan New Democratic Party members in good standing will be eligible to vote online or by mail-in ballot.

== Timeline ==
- April 4, 2016: NDP loses the 2016 general election to the Saskatchewan Party led by Brad Wall. NDP leader Cam Broten is defeated in his own riding.
- April 11, 2016: Cam Broten announces his resignation as leader.
- April 12, 2016: Trent Wotherspoon is elected interim leader by the NDP caucus.
- March 2, 2017: Ryan Meili wins the Saskatoon Meewasin by-election.
- May 1, 2017: Nomination period for candidates opens.
- May 18, 2017: Ryan Meili announces his intention to run.
- June 13, 2017: Trent Wotherspoon steps down as interim party leader and says he is considering running for the permanent position.
- June 20, 2017: Nicole Sarauer becomes interim leader.
- August 10, 2017: Saskatchewan Party leader Brad Wall announces his intentions to resign as Premier and leader of the governing party.
- August 16, 2017: Trent Wotherspoon announces his campaign for full-time leader.
- August 19, 2017: Date for the Saskatchewan Party leadership election is announced as January 27, 2018.
- September 15, 2017: NDP provincial council agrees to move up the date of the leadership election from May 8 to March 3, 2018.
- September 22, 2017: Ryan Meili launches campaign in Moose Jaw.
- January 12, 2018: Nomination period for candidates closes.
- January 19, 2018: Membership purchase deadline - to be eligible to vote for leadership.
- March 3, 2018: Leadership convention to be held in Regina.
  - 1 pm CST: Convention opens
  - 1:20 pm - Trent Wotherspoon makes his address
  - 1:50 pm - Ryan Meili makes his address
  - 2:15 to 3:15 pm - Balloting
  - 3:15 pm - Address by Interim leader Nicole Sarauer
  - 3:40 pm - Results announced
  - 3:45 - Winner's speech

== Declared candidates ==
=== Ryan Meili ===
Background

Meili is the MLA for Saskatoon Meewasin (2017–2022), a physician by profession who was the runner-up in the 2009 and 2013 leadership elections. Declared his candidacy on May 18, 2017

- Endorsements
  Support from caucus members: Cathy Sproule (MLA for Saskatoon Nutana)
  Support from federal caucus members: Tom Mulcair, Canada's NDP leader (2012-2017), MP for Outremont, Sheri Benson, MP for Saskatoon West, Georgina Jolibois, MP for Desnethé—Missinippi—Churchill River
  Support from former provincial caucus members: Lon Borgerson, former MLA for Sask Rivers, Peter Prebble, former MLA for Saskatoon Sutherland
  Former MPs: Libby Davies, Deputy Leader of Canada's NDP (2007-2015) and MP for Vancouver East (1997-2015), Ron Fisher, former MP for Saskatoon-Dundurn
  Former Provincial NDP Candidates : Jennifer Bowes, Tajinder Grewal, Ted Jaleta, Linsey Thornton
  Municipal Politicians: Bodean Desjarlais, Île-à-la-Crosse town councillor, Don Mitchell, Moose Jaw city councillor and former mayor
  Other Prominent Individuals : Yann Martel (author), Betsy Bury (Planned Parenthood pioneer, Governor General's Award recipient), Dr. Sally Mahood (Professor of Medicine and women's health advocate), Dennis Raphael (health policy advocate), Danny Papadatos (Co-Chair Saskatoon Pride Festival), Larissa Shasko (former Green Party of Saskatchewan leader)
  Labour organizations: United Food and Commercial Workers Saskatchewan executive council, United Food and Commercial Workers Local 1400, Canadian Union of Public Employees Local 974, Massage Therapists Association of Saskatchewan

Campaign website
www.ryanmeili.com
Other information

=== Trent Wotherspoon ===
Background

Wotherspoon is the MLA for Regina Rosemont (2007–present) and third-place finisher in 2013 leadership election. Wotherspoon stepped down as interim party leader on June 13, 2017 and said he was considering running for the permanent position. He announced his candidacy on August 16, 2017.

- Endorsements
  Support from caucus members: Carla Beck (MLA for Regina Lakeview, 2016–present), Danielle Chartier (MLA for Saskatoon Riversdale, 2009–2020), Warren McCall (MLA for Regina Elphinstone-Centre, 2000–2020), Nicole Rancourt (MLA for Prince Albert Northcote, 2016–2020)
  Support from federal caucus members:
  Support from former provincial caucus members:
  Former MPs:
  Former Provincial NDP Candidates :
  Municipal Politicians
  Other Prominent Individuals :
  Labour organizations:
  Media:

Other information

== Declined ==
- Carla Beck - MLA for Regina Lakeview (2016–present); endorsed Wotherspoon.
- Danielle Chartier - MLA for Saskatoon Riversdale (2009–present); endorsed Wotherspoon
- Noah Evanchuk - Regina lawyer and past federal candidate.
- Nicole Sarauer - MLA for Regina Douglas Park (2016–present), accepted position of interim leader on June 20, 2017.
- Erin Weir - NDP MP for Regina—Lewvan (2015–2019), economist and 2013 leadership candidate.

== Results ==
- Ryan Meili: 5,973 votes (55%)
- Trent Wotherspoon: 4,860 votes (45%)

Turnout: 81%

== See also ==
- Leadership convention
