= Saskatchewan CCF/NDP leadership elections =

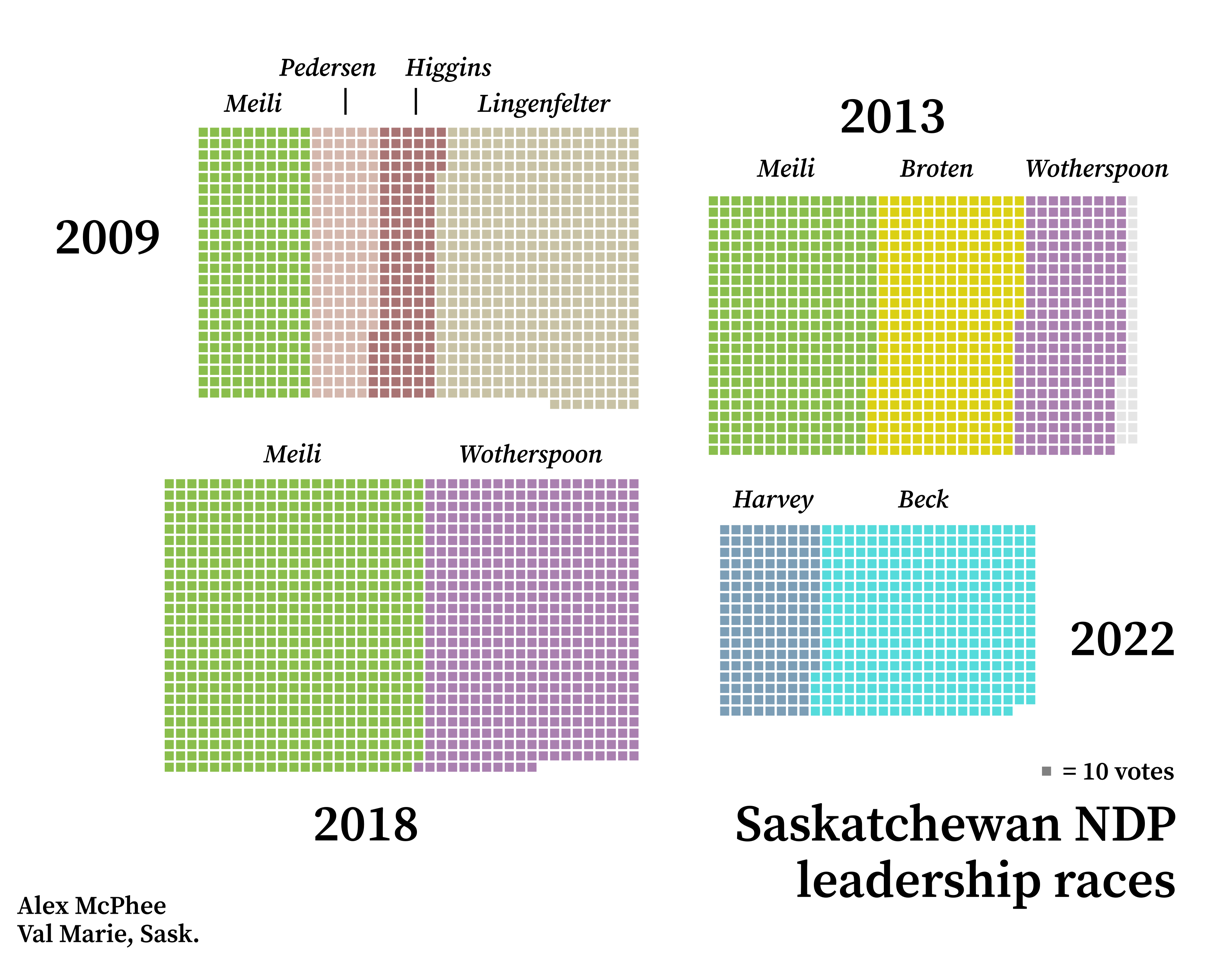
Results of the last four leadership elections.

This page shows the results of leadership elections in the Saskatchewan New Democratic Party (known as the Farmer-Labour Party from 1932 to 1934, and the Cooperative Commonwealth Federation from 1934 to 1967). Prior to 2001, the leader was elected via a delegated convention. Following the resignation of Roy Romanow, the leader was chosen through a One Member One Vote election.

== 1932 Farmer-Labour Party leadership convention ==
(Held on July 27, 1932.)

- M.J. Coldwell acclaimed

Note: The Farmer-Labour Party was launched as a merger of Coldwell's Independent Labour Party of Saskatchewan and George Williams's United Farmers of Canada (Saskatchewan Section). Williams was nominated as a candidate, but withdrew in favour of Coldwell.

== Developments, 1932-1936 ==
In 1933, the Saskatchewan Farmer-Labour Party became the Saskatchewan branch of the Cooperative Commonwealth Federation. Coldwell was elected to the House of Commons of Canada in 1935, and Williams was chosen as the Saskatchewan CCF's acting leader on December 16, 1935. Coldwell's resignation from the party leadership was not made official until July 17, 1936.

== 1936 Cooperative Commonwealth Federation leadership convention ==
(Held on July 17, 1936.)

- George Williams acclaimed

Note: Hugh MacLean was also nominated as a candidate, but withdrew.

== Developments, 1936-1942 ==
In 1940, Carlyle King challenged George Williams for the presidency of the party (Williams was both party president and leader) but received only about one-third of the vote.

Williams joined the Canadian Forces in early 1941, and subsequently saw overseas action in World War II. On February 12, 1941, John Brockelbank was chosen to lead the party in the legislature. Williams still retained the position of party president until 1941, when Tommy Douglas successfully challenged Williams for the party presidency. The next year, Douglas also unseated Williams as party leader.

== 1942 Cooperative Commonwealth Federation leadership convention ==
(Held on July 17, 1942.)

- Tommy Douglas
- George Williams
- John Brockelbank
- Oakland Valleau

Note: The vote totals were not announced. There are conflicting reports as to whether or not Brockelbank withdrew before voting began.

== 1943 Cooperative Commonwealth Federation leadership challenge ==
(Held on July 16, 1943.)

- Tommy Douglas
- John Brockelbank

Note: The vote totals were not announced. Valleau was again a candidate, but withdrew before balloting; Douglas won in landslide.

== 1961 Cooperative Commonwealth Federation leadership convention ==
(Held on November 3, 1961.)

- Woodrow Lloyd 425
- Ole Turnbull 109

== 1970 New Democratic Party leadership convention ==
(Held on July 4, 1970.)

First ballot:

- Roy Romanow 300
- Allan Blakeney 286
- Don Mitchell 187
- George Taylor 78

Second ballot:

- Roy Romanow 320
- Allan Blakeney 311
- Don Mitchell 219

Third ballot:

- Allan Blakeney 407
- Roy Romanow 349

== 1987 New Democratic Party leadership convention ==
(Held on November 7, 1987.)

- Roy Romanow acclaimed

== 2001 New Democratic Party leadership convention ==
(Held on January 27, 2001.)

First ballot:

- Lorne Calvert 6,542
- Chris Axworthy 5,344
- Nettie Wiebe 3487
- Maynard Sonntag 1,459
- Scott Banda 1,269
- Joanne Crofford 699
- Buckley Belanger 665

(Crofford and Belanger eliminated at under 5%)

Second ballot:

- Lorne Calvert 6,877
- Chris Axworthy 5,646
- Nettie Wiebe 3,749
- Maynard Sonntag 1,712
- Scott Banda 1,309

(Banda eliminated, Sonntag withdraws)

Third ballot:

- Lorne Calvert 7,831
- Chris Axworthy 6,686
- Nettie Wiebe 4,216

(Wiebe eliminated)

Fourth ballot:

- Lorne Calvert 10,289
- Chris Axworthy 7,575

== 2009 New Democratic Party leadership convention ==
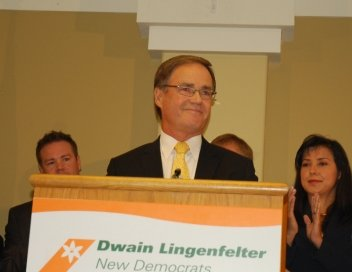
Dwain Lingenfelter, announcing his candidacy for the NDP leadership

A leadership convention was held on June 5–7, 2009. The vote for leader took place on June 6, 2009 and all 13051 members of the Saskatchewan NDP were eligible to cast ballots in person, by mail, by phone or online. There was a $200,000 spending limit for candidates.

There were four declared candidates for the leadership: MLA Deb Higgins, former Deputy Premier Dwain Lingenfelter, physician and community health activist Ryan Meili, and former party president Yens Pedersen.

First ballot

- Dwain Lingenfelter 4,360 (46.17%)
- Ryan Meili 2,401 (25.42%)
- Yens Pedersen 1,380 (14.61%)
- Deb Higgins 1,303 (13.8%)

(Higgins eliminated, Pedersen withdrew)

Second ballot

- Dwain Lingenfelter 5,028 (55.07%)
- Ryan Meili 4,102 (44.93%)

Total votes cast: 9,130

== 2013 New Democratic Party leadership convention ==
(held on March 9, 2013)

A leadership convention was called following the resignation of Dwain Lingenfelter after losing his seat in the 2011 general election.

The candidates were:Cam Broten, MLA for Saskatoon Massey Place; Ryan Meili, doctor, author and community advocate; Trent Wotherspoon, MLA, Regina Rosemont. A fourth candidate, economist Erin Weir withdrew prior to the convention and endorsed Meili.

First ballot

- Ryan Meili 3,384 (38.8%)
- Cam Broten 2,942 (33.5%)
- Trent Wotherspoon 2,120 (24.3%)
- Other 273 (3.1%)[spoiled ballots and any Weir votes cast before Weir withdrew]

(Weir withdrew February 20 to support Meili, too late to be removed from the mail ballot; Wotherspoon withdraws following the first ballot without endorsing a candidate.)

Second ballot

- Cam Broten 4,164 (50.3%)
- Ryan Meili 4,120 (49.7%)

== 2018 New Democratic Party leadership convention ==
An election for the leadership of the Saskatchewan New Democratic Party was held on March 3, 2018 in Regina, as a result of the resignation of leader Cam Broten after leading the party to its third consecutive general election loss and losing own his seat in the legislature. There were two declared candidates: Saskatoon physician and past leadership candidate Ryan Meili and Regina-Rosemont MLA since 2007 Trent Wotherspoon. Ryan Meili was elected leader with 55% of the popular vote.

Results

- Ryan Meili 5,973 (55%)
- Trent Wotherspoon 4,860 (45%)

Turnout: 81%

== 2022 New Democratic Party leadership convention ==
An election for the leadership of the Saskatchewan New Democratic Party was held on June 26, 2022 in Regina following the resignation of Ryan Meili. Carla Beck was declared as the first elected female leader of the party at this convention.

Results

- Carla Beck: 3,244 votes (68%)
- Kaitlyn Harvey: 1,492 votes (32%)

Turnout: 65%
