= 2022 Saskatchewan New Democratic Party leadership election =

Leadership election in the Canadian province of Saskatchewan

- June 26, 2022
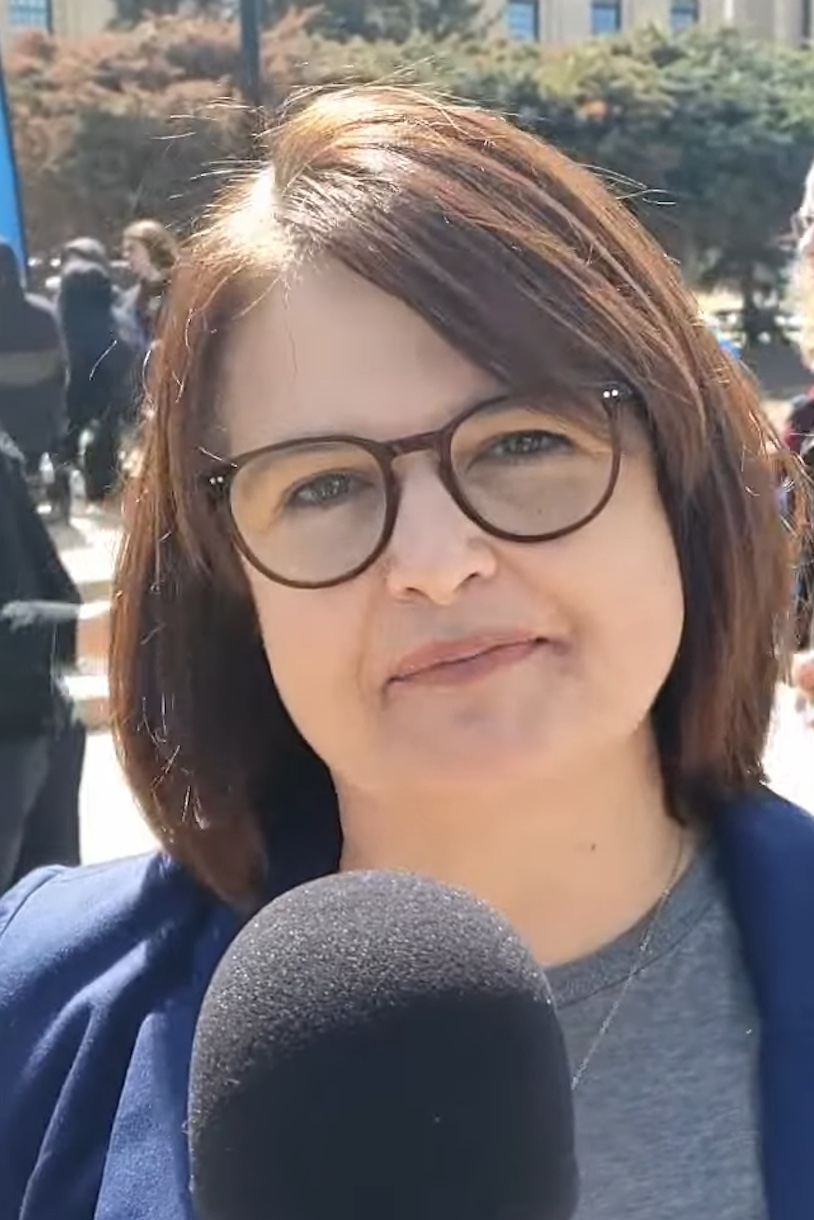
		KH
Candidate	Carla Beck	Kaitlyn Harvey
Popular vote	3,244	1,492
Percentage	68.50%	31.50%
Leader before election
Ryan Meili
Elected Leader
Carla Beck

2022 Saskatchewan New Democratic Party leadership election
- Date: June 26, 2022
- Convention: Regina, Saskatchewan
- Resigning leader: Ryan Meili
- Won by: Carla Beck
- Candidates: 2
- Entrance fee: $4,000
- Spending limit: $200,000

An election for the leadership of the Saskatchewan New Democratic Party was held on June 26, 2022, in Regina, Saskatchewan, as a result of the resignation of Ryan Meili. Carla Beck was chosen the party's first elected female leader.

== Rules ==
All Saskatchewan New Democratic Party members in good standing were eligible to vote online, by mail-in ballot, or in person at the convention.

== Timeline ==
- October 26, 2020: the NDP loses the 2020 general election to the Saskatchewan Party.
- February 15, 2022: NDP candidate Georgina Jolibois loses the 2022 Athabasca provincial by-election.
- February 18, 2022: Ryan Meili announces his resignation as leader, remaining in the position until a new leader is chosen.
- February 28, 2022: a leadership election is announced for June 2022.
- March 3, 2022: Carla Beck announces her leadership campaign.
- April 5, 2022: Kaitlyn Harvey announces her leadership campaign.
- June 26, 2022: Carla Beck is elected as the new leader of the Saskatchewan NDP.

== Candidates ==
=== Carla Beck ===
Background

Carla Beck is the MLA for Regina Lakeview (2016–present).

Candidacy announced: March 3, 2022
Campaign website: carlaforleader.ca

Endorsements of Carla Beck

Current MLAs: (6)

- Matt Love (MLA for Saskatoon Eastview)
- Betty Nippi-Albright (MLA for Saskatoon Centre)
- Nicole Sarauer (MLA for Regina Douglas Park)
- Doyle Vermette (MLA for Cumberland)
- Trent Wotherspoon (MLA for Regina Rosemont)
- Aleana Young (MLA for Regina University)

Former MLAs: (10)

- Pat Atkinson (MLA for Saskatoon Nutana, 1986-1991, and Saskatoon Broadway, 1991-1995)
- Judy Bradley (MLA for Bengough-Milestone, 1991-1995, and Weyburn-Big Muddy, 1995-1999)
- Eric Cline (MLA for Saskatoon Idylwyld, 1991-1995, Saskatoon Mount Royal, 1995-2003, and Saskatoon Massey Place, 2003-2007)
- David Forbes (MLA for Saskatoon Centre, 2001-2020)
- Doreen Hamilton (MLA for Regina Wascana Plains, 1991-2007, and mayor of Regina, 1988)
- Deb Higgins (MLA for Moose Jaw Wakamow, 1999-2011, and mayor of Moose Jaw, 2012-2016)
- Carolyn Jones (MLA for Saskatoon Meewasin, 1999-2003)
- Judy Junor (MLA for Saskatoon Eastview, 1998-2011)
- Suzanne Murray (MLA for Qu'Appelle-Lumsden, 1991-1995, and Regina Qu'Appelle Valley, 1995-1999)
- Nicole Rancourt (MLA for Prince Albert Northcote, 2016-2020)

Other Prominent Individuals: (1)

- Dave McGrane (Professor, political scientist, community activist, and 2020 candidate in Saskatoon Churchill-Wildwood)

Organizations: (2)

- Canadian Union of Public Employees Saskatchewan
- United Steelworkers District 3

=== Kaitlyn Harvey ===
Background

Kaitlyn Harvey was the NDP candidate for Saskatoon Willowgrove in 2020. She had sought the nomination in Saskatoon Meewasin, the seat of outgoing leader Meili, but revoked her candidacy in July 2022.

Candidacy announced: April 5, 2022
Campaign website: https://www.changestartshere.ca

Endorsements of Kaitlyn Harvey

Current MLAs: (1)

- Jennifer Bowes (MLA for Saskatoon University)

Former MLAs: (1)

- Cathy Sproule (MLA for Saskatoon Nutana, 2011-2020)

Other Prominent Individuals: (1)

- Nettie Wiebe (Professor, 2001 Saskatchewan NDP leadership candidate, and 2004, 2006, 2008, and 2011 federal NDP candidate)

== Declined ==
- Jennifer Bowes, MLA for Saskatoon University (2020–2024); endorsed Harvey
- Charlie Clark, Mayor of Saskatoon (2016–2024)
- Meara Conway, MLA for Regina Elphinstone-Centre (2020–present)
- Betty Nippi-Albright, MLA for Saskatoon Centre (2020–present); endorsed Beck
- Nicole Sarauer, MLA for Regina Douglas Park (2016–present); endorsed Beck
- Trent Wotherspoon, MLA for Regina Rosemont (2007–present); endorsed Beck
- Aleana Young, MLA for Regina University (2020–present); endorsed Beck

== Results ==
- Carla Beck: 3,244 votes (68%)
- Kaitlyn Harvey: 1,492 votes (32%)

Turnout: 65%

== See also ==
- Leadership convention
