= 2013 Saskatchewan New Democratic Party leadership election =

- March 9, 2013
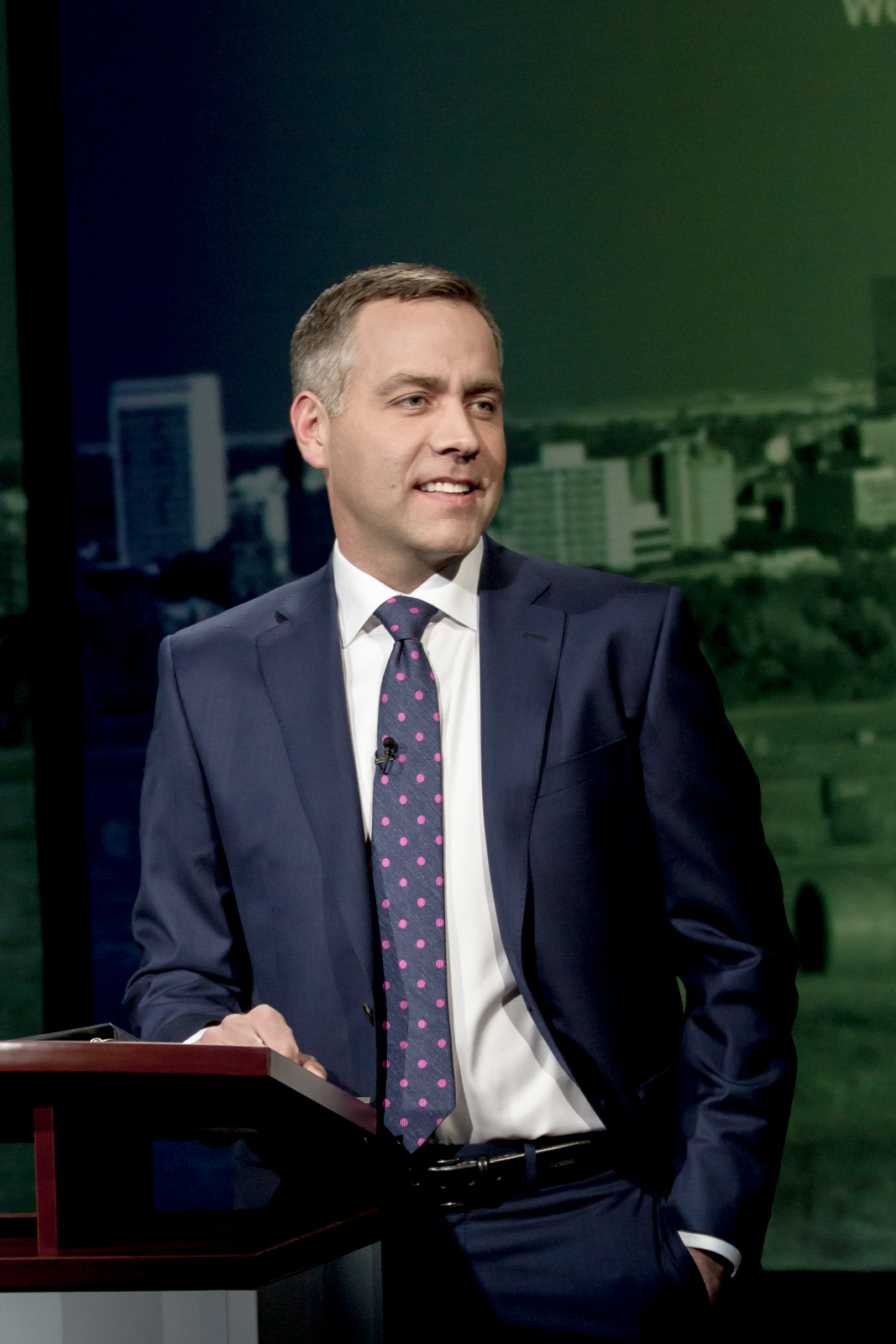

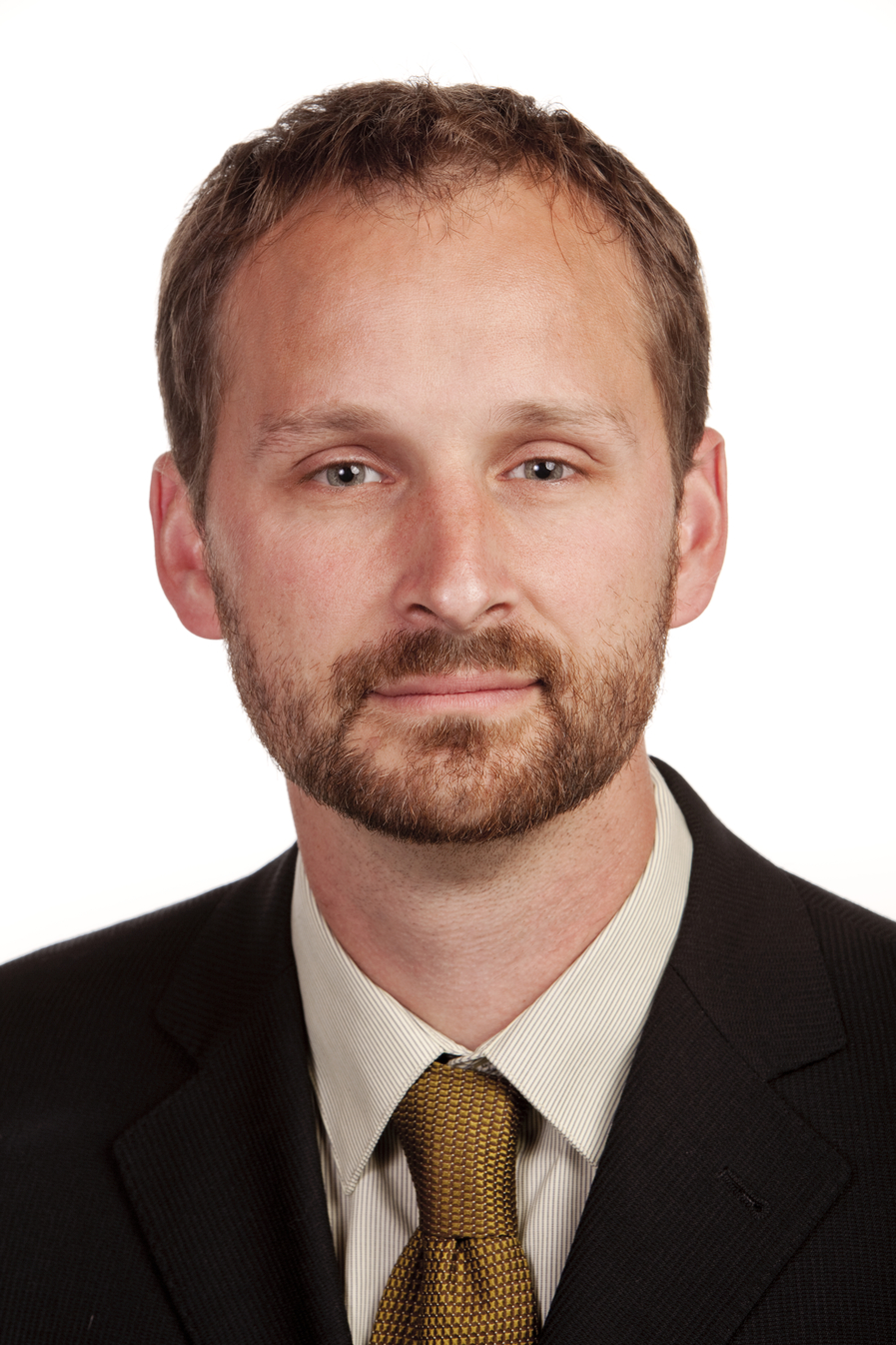
			TW
Candidate	Cam Broten	Ryan Meili	Trent Wotherspoon
Final ballot	4,164 (50.27%)	4,120 (49.73%)	Withdrew
First ballot	2,942 (33.74%)	3,384 (38.81%)	2,120 (24.31%)
Leader before election
Dwain Lingenfelter
Elected Leader
Cam Broten

2013 Saskatchewan New Democratic Party leadership election
- Date: March 9, 2013
- Convention: TCU Place, Saskatoon
- Resigning leader: Dwain Lingenfelter
- Won by: Cam Broten
- Ballots: 2
- Candidates: 4
- Entrance fee: $6,000 CDN
- Spending limit: $200,000 CDN

An election for the leadership of the Saskatchewan New Democratic Party was triggered on November 7, 2011 following Dwain Lingenfelter's resignation after losing his seat in the 2011 election. The party selected its new leader on March 9, 2013, by a one-member one vote system held during a convention at TCU Place in Saskatoon.

== Timeline ==
- June 7, 2009: Dwain Lingenfelter wins the leadership election to succeed Lorne Calvert.
- November 7, 2011: The 2011 general election is held, reducing the NDP to nine seats. Dwain Lingenfelter loses his seat, and resigns as NDP leader.
- November 19, 2011: The provincial council of the Saskatchewan NDP elects Regina Lakeview MLA John Nilson as interim leader.
- March 10, 2012: The party announces the date and rules for the 2013 leadership race, scheduling it for either February or March 2013. The party announces that it will use a one member, one vote system using a preferential ballot. The party also announces tighter rules about how memberships can be purchased.
- May 4, 2012: The party announces that the leadership convention will be held on March 9, 2013, with a general convention scheduled to be held on March 8 and 10.
- November 18, 2012: First all-candidates debate is held in Regina
- November 22, 2012: Second all-candidates debate is held in Humboldt
- November 24, 2012: Third all-candidates debate is held in Saskatoon
- November 29, 2012: Fourth all-candidates debate is held in Swift Current
- December 1, 2012: Fifth all-candidates debate is held in Melfort
- January 12, 2013: Sixth all-candidates debate will be held in Rosetown
- January 19, 2013: Seventh all-candidates debate will be held in Weyburn
- January 24, 2013: Eighth all-candidates debate will be held in North Battleford
- January 26, 2013: Deadline for new members to sign-up and be eligible to vote at the leadership convention.
- January 31, 2013: Ninth all-candidates debate will be held in Yorkton
- February 7, 2013: Tenth all-candidates debate will be held in Prince Albert
- February 9, 2013: Eleventh all-candidates debate will be held in Regina
- February 13, 2013: Twelfth all-candidates debate will be held in Moose Jaw
- February 16, 2013: Final all-candidates debate will be held in Saskatoon
- March 8–10, 2013: Convention will be held at TCU Place in Saskatoon.
- March 9, 2013: Last day of voting. Results announced at leadership convention.

== Candidates ==
=== Cam Broten ===
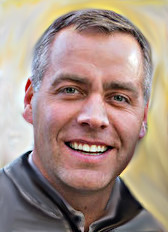
Cam Broten

Background

MLA for Saskatoon Massey Place (2007–2016)

Date campaign launched: September 5, 2012
Campaign website: www.cambroten2013.ca
Supporters

- MLAs: (3) Danielle Chartier (Saskatoon Riversdale); Cathy Sproule (Saskatoon Nutana); Doyle Vermette (Cumberland)
- Former MLAs: (4) Eric Cline (Saskatoon Massey Place 1991-2007, former cabinet minister); Jerome Hammersmith (Prince Albert-Duck Lake 1978-1983, former cabinet minister); Frank Quennell (Saskatoon Meewasin 2003-2011, former cabinet minister); Len Taylor (The Battlefords 2003-2011, Former MP for The Battlefords—Meadow Lake 1988-1997, former cabinet minister)
- Federal politicians: (1) Ray Funk (Former MP for Prince Albert—Churchill River 1988-1993)
- Municipal politicians:
- Labour organizations:
- Other prominent individuals: (1) Former President of the Saskatchewan Young New Democrats Mitchell Anderson

=== Ryan Meili ===
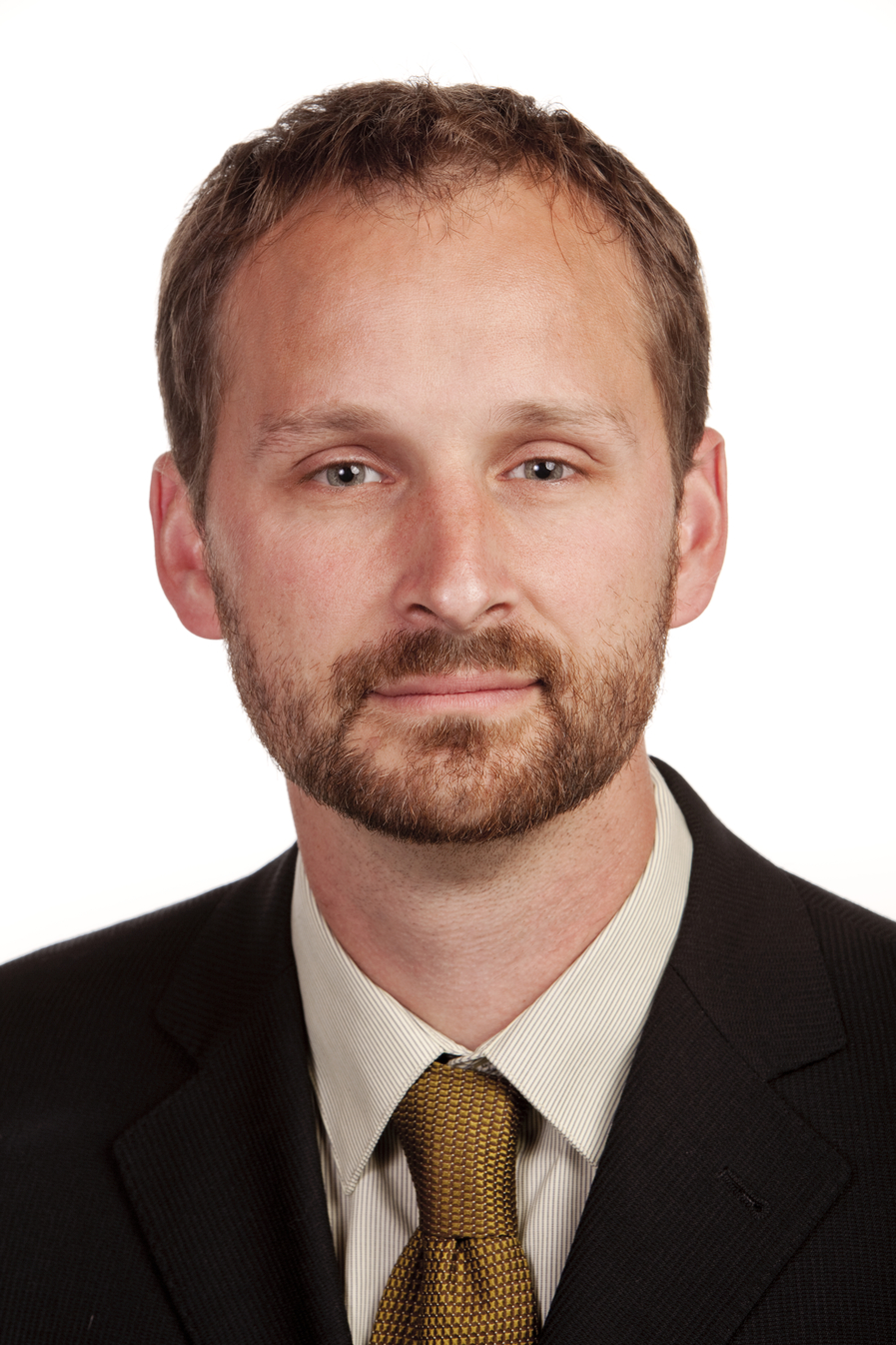
Ryan Meili

Background

Doctor, author and community health advocate.
Runner-up for the Saskatchewan NDP leadership in 2009.

Date campaign launched: September 14, 2012
Campaign website: www.ryanmei.li
Supporters

- MLAs:
- Former MLAs: (3) Lon Borgerson (Saskatchewan Rivers 2003-2007); Robert Llewellyn Lyons (Regina Rosemont 1986-1995); Mark Wartman (Regina Qu'Appelle Valley 1999-2007, former cabinet minister)
- Federal politicians: (2) Niki Ashton (Churchill); Libby Davies (Vancouver East)
- Municipal politicians: (2) Charlie Clark (Saskatoon councillor); Don Mitchell (Former Mayor of Moose Jaw and Moose Jaw councillor)
- Labour organizations: (1) United Food and Commercial Workers Saskatchewan
- Other prominent individuals: (4) Former President of the Saskatchewan Teachers' Federation Steven Allen; Saskatchewan NDP Vice-President Gavin Gardiner; York University professor of Health Policy and Management Dennis Raphael; Nettie Wiebe

=== Trent Wotherspoon ===
Background

MLA for Regina Rosemont (2007–present)

Date campaign launched: September 14, 2012
Campaign website: www.trent4leader.ca
Supporters

- MLAs: (1) Warren McCall (Regina Elphinstone-Centre, former cabinet minister)
- Former MLAs: (14) Donald William Cody (Watrous 1971-1975 and Kinistino 1978-1982, former cabinet minister, former Mayor of Prince Albert, and Prince Albert councillor); Joanne Crofford (Regina Rosemont 1991-2007, former cabinet minister); Darcy Furber (Prince Albert Northcote 2007-2011); Ron Harper (Pelly 1991-1995 and Regina Northeast 1999-2011, former cabinet minister); Andy Iwanchuk (Saskatoon Fairview 2003-2011); Judy Junor (Saskatoon Eastview 1998-2011, former cabinet minister); Reg Knezacek (Saltcoats 1991-1995); Eldon Lautermilch (Prince Albert Northcote 1986-2007, former cabinet minister); Sandra Morin (Regina Walsh Acres 2003-2011, former cabinet minister); Lorne Scott (Indian Head-Milestone 1995-1999, former cabinet minister); John Solomon (Regina North West 1979-1982 and 1986-1994, Former MP for Regina—Lumsden—Lake Centre 1993-2000); Violet Stanger (Lloydminster 1991-1999); Kim Trew (Regina Coronation Park 1986-2011, former cabinet minister); Harry Van Mulligen (Regina Douglas Park 1986-2009, former cabinet minister)
- Federal politicians: (2) John Burton (Former MP for Regina East 1968-1972); John Edmund Parry (Former MP for Kenora—Rainy River 1984-1988)
- Municipal politicians:
- Labour organizations: (2) Iron Workers Union Local No. 771; Saskatchewan Building Trades Council
- Other prominent individuals: (2) Saskatchewan NDP Vice-President Joanna Sanders; Former Saskatchewan NDP President Jeff Grubb

== Withdrawn candidates ==
=== Erin Weir ===
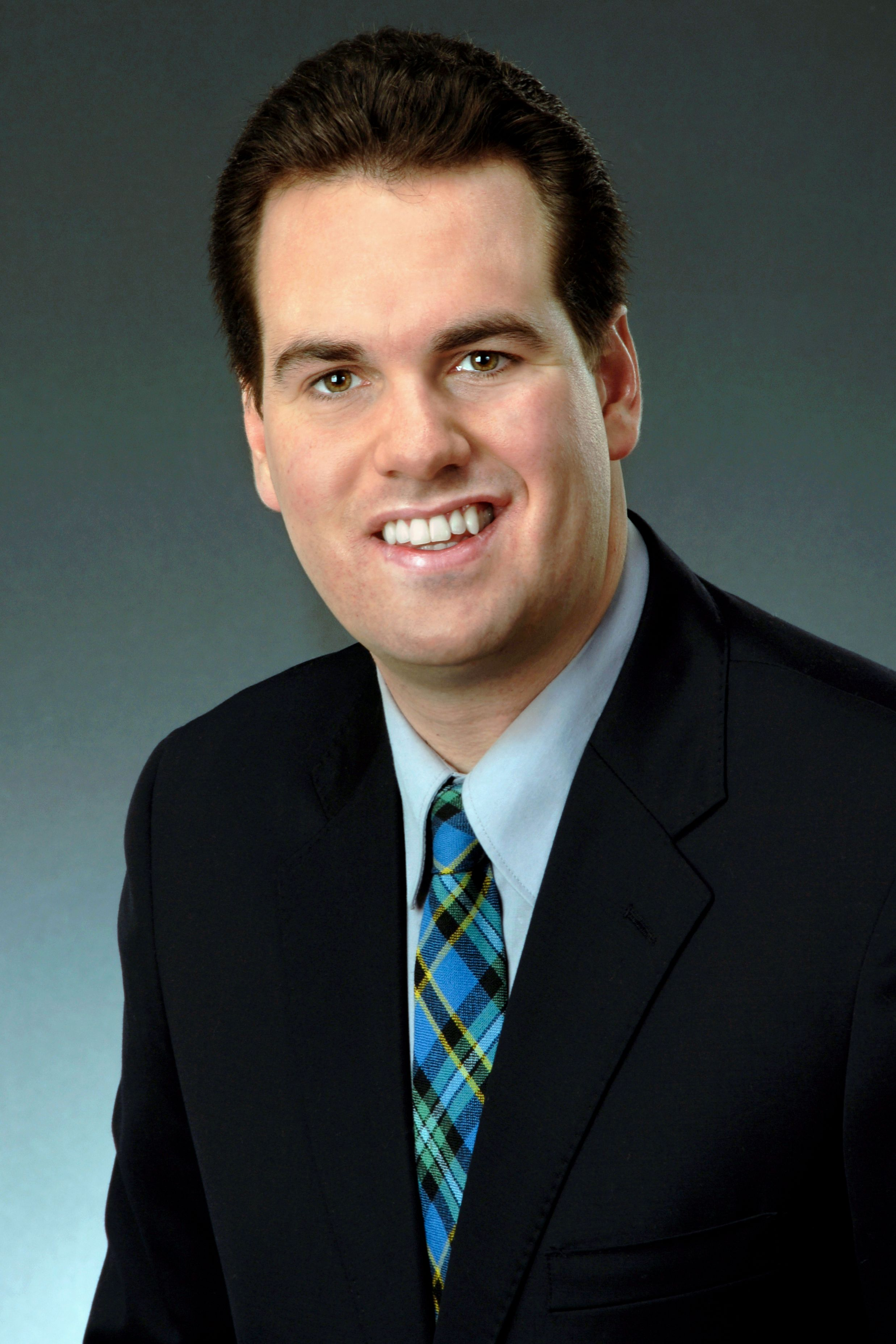
Erin Weir

Background

Economist
Former President and Vice-President of the Saskatchewan Young New Democrats
Federal NDP candidate in Wascana during the 2004 election.
Weir withdrew from the race on February 20, 2013 and endorsed Ryan Meili.

Date campaign launched: September 7, 2012
Date campaign withdrawn: February 20, 2013
Campaign website: www.erinweir.ca
Supporters

- Former MLAs: (2) Doreen Hamilton (Regina Wascana Plains 1991-2007, former cabinet minister); Anne deBlois Smart (Saskatoon Centre 1986-1991)
- Federal politicians: (2) Bill Knight (Former MP for Assiniboia 1971-1974); Dick Proctor (Former MP for Palliser 1997-2004)
- Other prominent individuals: (5) Former Premier of Manitoba Howard Pawley; Former Saskatchewan NDP Vice-President Steven Lloyd; Former Saskatchewan NDP Provincial Secretaries Rod Dickinson and Larry Deters; Mel Watkins and James Laxer, co-founders of The Waffle

=== Declined ===
- Buckley Belanger, MLA for Athabasca
- Danielle Chartier, MLA for Saskatoon Riversdale
- David Forbes, MLA for Saskatoon Centre
- Warren McCall, MLA for Regina Elphinstone-Centre
- John Nilson, Current interim leader and MLA for Regina Lakeview
- Cathy Sproule, MLA for Saskatoon Nutana
- Doyle Vermette, MLA for Cumberland

== Results ==
=== First ballot ===
- Ryan Meili 3,384 (38.8%)
- Cam Broten 2,942 (33.7%)
- Trent Wotherspoon 2,120 (24.3%)
- Other 273 (3.1%)[spoiled ballots and any Weir votes cast before Weir withdrew]

(Weir withdrew February 20 to support Meili, too late to be removed from the mail ballot; Wotherspoon withdraws following the first ballot without endorsing a candidate.)

=== Second ballot ===
- Cam Broten 4,164 (50.3%)
- Ryan Meili 4,120 (49.7%)

== See also ==
- Leadership convention
