= Official Opposition (Canada) =

Canadian parliamentary caucus

The Official Opposition (French: Opposition officielle), also known as His Majesty's Loyal Opposition, is the largest party of the parliamentary opposition, which is composed of members of Parliament (MPs) who are not in government. Typically, it is the second-largest party in the House of Commons.

The Official Opposition is viewed as the caucus tasked with keeping the government in check. It is also generally viewed as the alternative government or "government in waiting". The Official Opposition maintains a shadow cabinet, with the leader of the Official Opposition at its head, of members of Parliament (MPs) and senators who often have the same portfolio areas of interest as actual ministers. The spokesperson for each portfolio is known as an opposition critic. In the event the government loses the confidence of the House or the Official Opposition party wins a general election, the party is ready to become the government.

The current Official Opposition is the caucus of the Conservative Party, assuming the role following its loss of power in the 2015 federal election. The Opposition is led by Pierre Poilievre, who became Conservative leader following the 2022 leadership election, until he lost his bid for re-election in Carleton in the 2025 federal election, a riding he, prior to the election, held since 2004. He has since been re-elected in a by-election for the Battle River—Crowfoot riding of Alberta and has retaken his position as Leader of the Official Opposition.

== Nomenclature ==
The formal title of "Official Opposition" is used in the Standing Orders of the House of Commons. The Official Opposition is sometimes also referred to as the Loyal Opposition (or sometimes His Majesty's Loyal Opposition) to express the idea that, although the group may be against the sitting government, it remains loyal to the Crown (the embodiment of the Canadian state) and thus to Canada.

Former leader of the Official Opposition, Michael Ignatieff, explains:

"The opposition performs an adversarial function critical to democracy itself… Governments have no right to question the loyalty of those who oppose them. Adversaries remain citizens of the same state, common subjects of the same sovereign, servants of the same law."

== History ==
After the 1921 election, the Progressive Party, a looseknit largely agrarian "protest" party, won the second largest number of seats to William Lyon Mackenzie King's Liberals, but declined to be the Official Opposition because of their lack of national organization. The third-place Conservative Party, led by Arthur Meighen, thus became the Official Opposition.

As a result of the 1925 election, the Official Opposition was actually the largest party in the House of Commons, the Conservatives. The Liberals, led by Mackenzie King, were able to form a minority government despite the fact that they had a dozen fewer seats than the Conservatives because King's Liberals were able to win the support of the Progressives to remain in government. Similarly, in Ontario, the Ontario Progressive Conservative Party had the largest caucus but were relegated to official opposition not long after the 1985 election, as their minority government was defeated on a motion of non-confidence. The Ontario Liberal Party, the second largest party, governed from 1985 to 1987 with supply provided by the Ontario New Democratic Party.

In 1993, the Reform Party challenged whether the Quebec sovereigntist Bloc Québécois could hold the position of official opposition. The Speaker ruled in favour of the Bloc, as they held two more seats than Reform. During the Bloc's time as the official opposition, Quebec issues on national unity dominated Question Period, often to the irritation of the other opposition parties (indeed, Reform was the only other caucus that met official party status, with the NDP and PC parties falling short of that threshold). However, Reform was considered to be main opposition to the Liberals on all other issues that were not specific to Quebec. In 1995, when Bloc leader Lucien Bouchard's position as Opposition Leader granted him a meeting with the visiting American president, Bill Clinton, Reform leader Preston Manning was also given a meeting with Clinton in order to diffuse Bouchard's separatist leverage.

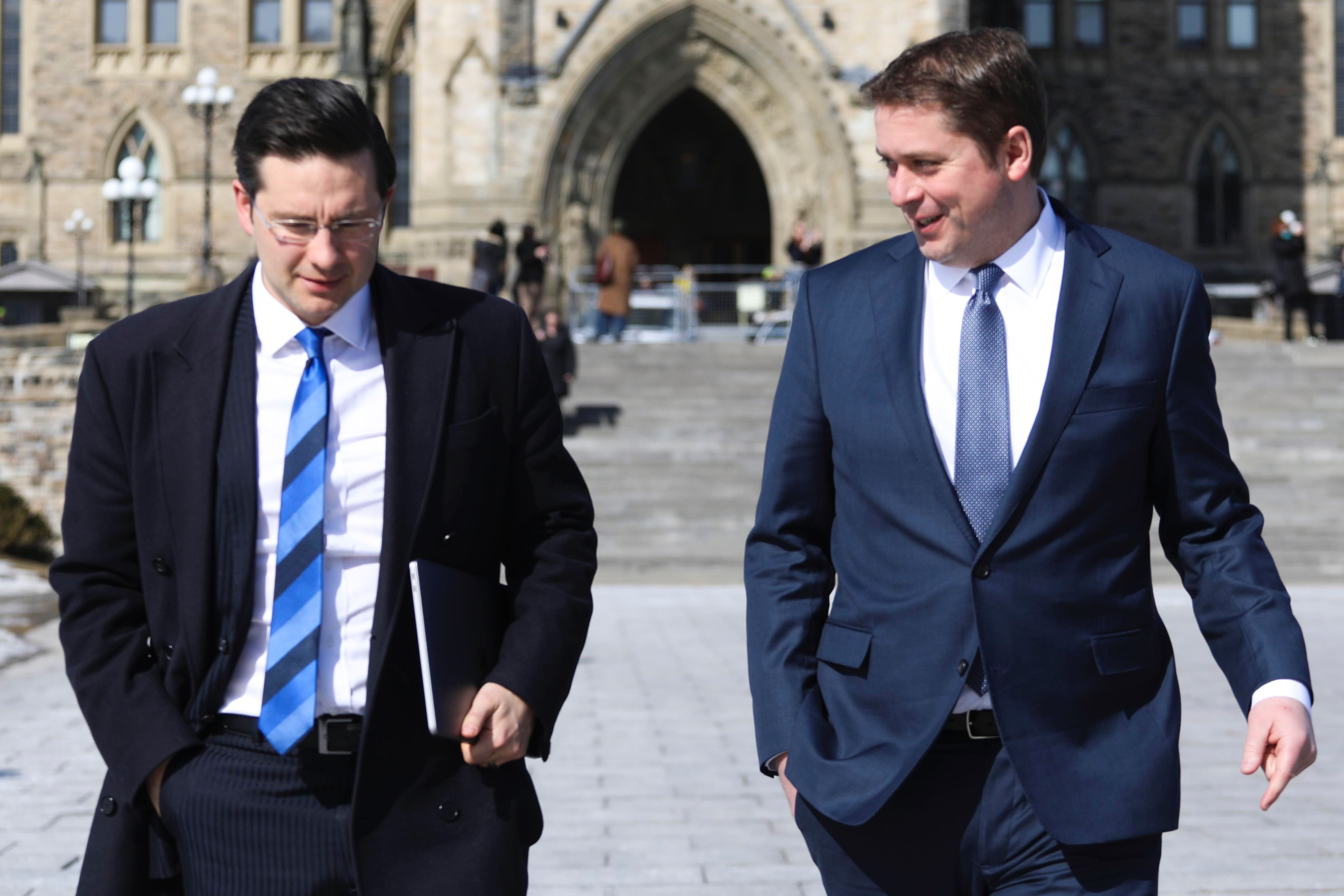
Former and current leaders of the Opposition Pierre Poilievre (2022–2025; 2025–present) and Andrew Scheer (2017–2020; 2025) on Parliament Hill, February 28, 2018

In 1987, the Liberals won every seat in the 51st New Brunswick Legislative Assembly. To ensure the proper functioning of the parliamentary system, Premier Frank McKenna named several members of his own caucus, led by Camille Thériault, to serve as the Official Opposition. The government also allowed the Progressive Conservative Party, which finished second place in the election in the number of votes received, to submit written questions to ministers during Question Period.

== Privileges ==
The Official Opposition party has advantages over other opposition parties in the House. They are assigned to speak first after the government, and receive more time in question period than other opposition parties. It also gets more office space, funding for research, and a larger staff than other parties.

The leader of the Opposition has an official residence in Ottawa known as Stornoway and the salary and similar privileges to those of a cabinet minister. Additionally, the leader and other shadow cabinet members have the privilege of meeting with visiting foreign dignitaries, which is not always granted to members of smaller parties.

== Senate ==
There is also an Official Opposition in the Senate of Canada. This is the largest party in the Senate that is not in government. As the governing party is determined in the House of Commons, the Official Opposition in the Senate may actually be larger than the government party in the Senate. It is customary, however, for the Senate to pass legislation approved in the House of Commons even if the government has a minority in the Senate. Although the Senate nominally has the power to block most legislation (except that, when the consent of a provincial legislature is necessary to change the Constitution, the Senate may be overridden after six months), this power is rarely exercised in practice.

The party that forms Official Opposition in the Senate is not necessarily the same party as in the House of Commons. From 1993 to 2003, the Official Opposition in the Senate was the Progressive Conservative Party of Canada, even though the Bloc Québécois was the Official Opposition in the House from 1993 to 1997, followed by the Reform Party, and then the Canadian Alliance from 1997 to 2003. This is because the BQ, and Reform Party had no Senators. However, when Senator Gerry St. Germain crossed the floor from the Progressive Conservatives to the Canadian Alliance in 2000, he argued that he should be recognized as the leader of the Opposition in the Senate as the Canadian Alliance formed the Official Opposition in the House of Commons. The speaker of the Senate of Canada ruled against him, however, as the Progressive Conservatives were the larger opposition party.

== Lists of Official Oppositions in the Parliament of Canada ==
Years	Official Opposition Commons	Official Opposition Senate
1867–1874	Liberal Party	Liberal Party
1874–1878	Conservative Party (Note: The Liberal-Conservative Party became the Conservative Party in 1873, however, some members still sat and were elected as Liberal-Conservatives after the change.)	Conservative Party
1878–1896	Liberal Party	Liberal Party
1896–1911	Conservative Party	Conservative Party
1911–1921	Liberal Party	Liberal Party
1921–1926	Conservative Party (Note: From 1921 to 1924, the Progressive Party of Canada had more MPs than the Conservative Party, but it turned down the chance of being Official Opposition, and the position passed to the Conservatives.)	Conservative Party
1926	Liberal Party	Liberal Party
1926–1930	Conservative Party	Conservative Party
1930–1935	Liberal Party	Liberal Party
1935–1945	Conservative Party (Note: The Conservative Party became the Progressive Conservative Party in 1945.)	Conservative Party
1945–1957	Progressive Conservative Party	Progressive Conservative Party
1957–1963	Liberal Party	Liberal Party
1963–1979	Progressive Conservative Party	Progressive Conservative Party
1979–1980	Liberal Party	Liberal Party
1980–1984	Progressive Conservative Party	Progressive Conservative Party
1984–1993	Liberal Party	Liberal Party
1993–1997	Bloc Québécois	Progressive Conservative Party
1997–2000	Reform Party	Progressive Conservative Party
2000–2004	Canadian Alliance (Note: The Reform Party became the Canadian Alliance in 2000.)	Progressive Conservative Party
2004–2006	Conservative Party (Note: The Canadian Alliance and the Progressive Conservative Party merged to form the Conservative Party in 2004)	Conservative Party
2006–2011	Liberal Party	Liberal Party
2011–2014	New Democratic Party	Liberal Party
2014–2015	New Democratic Party	Senate Liberal Caucus
2015–present	Conservative Party	Conservative Party (Note: During the 44th Canadian Parliament, both the Canadian Senators Group and the Progressive Senate Group surpassed the number of Senate seats held by the Conservative Party, but neither was made the official opposition.)

== Current provincial and territorial Official Oppositions ==
Due to consensus government, Nunavut and the Northwest Territories do not have Official Opposition in their respective legislatures.

List of current provincial and territorial Official Oppositions
Leader	Jurisdiction	Party	Parl.	List
Naheed Nenshi	Alberta	New Democratic	31st	List
Jennifer Whiteside	British Columbia	New Democratic	44th	List
Konrad Narth	Manitoba	Progressive Conservative	43rd	List
Margaret Johnson	New Brunswick	Progressive Conservative	61st	List
John Hogan	Newfoundland and Labrador	Liberal	51st	List
Claudia Chender	Nova Scotia	New Democratic	65th	List
Marit Stiles	Ontario	New Democratic	44th	List
Hal Perry	Prince Edward Island	Liberal	67th	List
Charles Milliard	Quebec	Liberal	44th	List
Carla Beck	Saskatchewan	New Democratic	30th	List
Kate White	Yukon	New Democratic	36th	List

== See also ==
- List of leaders of the Opposition in the Senate of Canada
- Official Opposition Shadow Cabinet (Canada)
