= Nathaniel Teed =

Canadian politician

Nathaniel Teed MLA
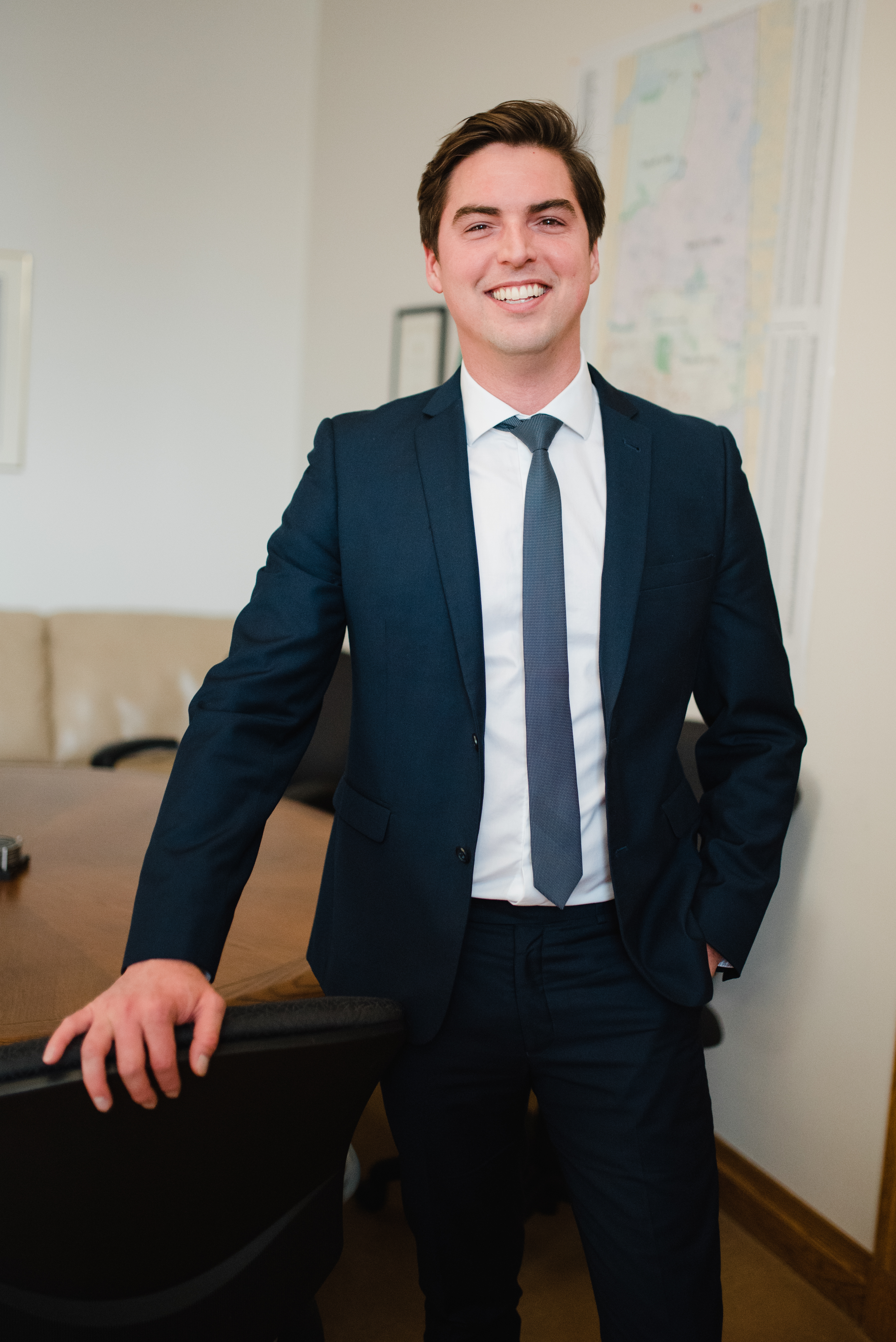

Deputy Whip of the Saskatchewan New Democratic Party
- Incumbent
- Assumed office October 5, 2024
- Leader: Carla Beck
- Preceded by: Jennifer Bowes

Shadow Minister of Labour
- Incumbent
- Assumed office November 13, 2024
- Preceded by: Nicole Sarauer

Shadow Minister for 2SLGBTQ+ Affairs
- Incumbent
- Assumed office June 3, 2025
- Preceded by: position established

Member of the Legislative Assembly of Saskatchewan for Saskatoon Meewasin
- Incumbent
- Assumed office September 26, 2022
- Preceded by: Ryan Meili

Personal details
- Party: New Democratic

Nathaniel Teed is a Canadian politician, who was elected to the Legislative Assembly of Saskatchewan in a by-election on September 26, 2022. He represents the district of Saskatoon Meewasin as a member of the Saskatchewan New Democratic Party caucus.

Teed has held several roles within the Official Opposition, including critic for Parks, Culture and Sport, Tourism, the Saskatchewan Liquor and Gaming Authority, SaskGaming, and Saskatchewan Government Insurance. Additionally, he serves as the Deputy Whip of the Official Opposition. Following the 2024 general election, Beck appointed Teed as the Shadow Minister for Labour.

He is the province's first openly gay MLA.

== Election results ==
=== 2024 Provincial general election ===
2024 Saskatchewan general election: Saskatoon Meewasin
| Party | Candidate | Votes | % |
|---|---|---|---|
| New Democratic | Nathaniel Teed | 4,617 | 59.20 |
| Saskatchewan | Maureen Alice Tor | 2,940 | 37.70 |
| Green | Jacklin Andrews | 242 | 3.10 |
| Total valid votes | | 7,872 | 99.1 |
| Total rejected ballots | | 73 | 0.9 |
| Turnout | | 7,945 | 59.90 |
| Eligible voters | | 13,270 | |
Source: Elections Saskatchewan

=== 2022 by-election ===
Saskatchewan provincial by-election, September 26, 2022: Saskatoon Meewasin Resignation of Ryan Meili
| Party | Candidate | Votes | % |
|---|---|---|---|
| New Democratic | Nathaniel Teed | 2,813 | 57.9 |
| Saskatchewan | Kim Groff | 1,730 | 36.6 |
| Liberal | Jeff Walters | 135 | 2.61 |
| Buffalo | Mark Friesen | 112 | 2.36 |
| Green | Jacklin Andrews | 58 | 1.18 |
| Total valid votes | | 4,860 | 99.85 |
| Total rejected ballots | | 12 | 0.2 |
| Turnout | | 4,860 | 39.4 |
| Eligible voters | | 12,373 | |
