= List of leaders of the opposition of Saskatchewan =

A list of parliamentary opposition leaders in the Canadian province of Saskatchewan, from 1906 to the present.

New Democratic Party (12)
Liberal Party (11)
Provincial Rights Party / Conservative Party of Saskatchewan / Progressive Conservative Party (9)
Saskatchewan Party (3)
Co-operative Commonwealth Federation (3)
Independent (2)
Progressive Party (1)
Farmer-Labour Group (1)

Name	Party	Took office	Left office
Frederick Haultain	Provincial Rights	1906	1912
W.B. Willoughby	Conservative	1912	1917
Donald MacLean	Conservative	1917	1920
Vacant (Note: There was no designated Leader of the Opposition for the sessions of 1921 and 1922.)		1921	1922
John Maharg	Independent	1923	1923
Harris Turner	Independent	1924	1925
**James Anderson** (Note: From 1925 to 1929, Anderson and Tran were both considered Leaders of the Opposition.)	Conservative	1925	1929
Charles Tran	Progressive	1925	1929
**James G. Gardiner**	Liberal	1929	1934
George Williams	Farmer-Labour	1934	1938
George Williams	CCF	1938	1940
John Brockelbank	CCF	1941	1944
**William Patterson**	Liberal	1944	1948
Walter Tucker	Liberal	1949	1954
Asmundur A. Loptson	Liberal	1954	1954
Alexander H. McDonald	Liberal	1955	1960
**Ross Thatcher**	Liberal	1961	1964
**Woodrow Lloyd**	CCF	1964	1967
**Woodrow Lloyd**	NDP	1967	1970
**Allan Blakeney**	NDP	1970	1971
David Steuart	Liberal	1971	1976
Ted Malone (Note: From 1977 to 1978, Malone was the Leader of the Liberal Opposition and Collver was the Leader of the Progressive Conservative Opposition, as their parties had exactly equal representation in the Assembly.)	Liberal	1976	1978
Dick Collver	Progressive Conservative	1977	1979
Eric Berntson	Progressive Conservative	1979	1982
**Allan Blakeney**	NDP	1982	1987
**Roy Romanow**	NDP	1987	1991
**Grant Devine**	Progressive Conservative	1991	1992
Rick Swenson	Progressive Conservative	1993	1994
Bill Boyd	Progressive Conservative	1994	1995
Lynda Haverstock	Liberal	1995	1995
Ron Osika	Liberal	1995	1996
Ken Krawetz	Liberal	1996	1997
Ken Krawetz	Saskatchewan Party	1997	1999
Elwin Hermanson	Saskatchewan Party	1999	2004
Lyle Stewart	Saskatchewan Party	2004	2004
**Brad Wall**	Saskatchewan Party	2004	2007
**Lorne Calvert**	NDP	2007	2009
Len Taylor	NDP	2009	2009
Dwain Lingenfelter	NDP	2009	2011
John Nilson	NDP	2011	2013
Cam Broten	NDP	2013	2016
Trent Wotherspoon	NDP	2016	2017
Nicole Sarauer	NDP	2017	2018
Ryan Meili	NDP	2018	2022
Carla Beck	NDP	2022	present

Bold indicates had been, or became, premier

== Notes ==
Source: Saskatchewan Archives
