= Vicki Mowat =

Canadian politician

Vicki Mowat MLA

Deputy Leader of the Saskatchewan New Democratic Party
- Incumbent
- Assumed office October 5, 2022
- Leader: Carla Beck
- Preceded by: Nicole Sarauer

House Leader of the Saskatchewan New Democratic Party
- In office November 4, 2020 – October 5, 2022
- Leader: Ryan Meili
- Succeeded by: Nicole Sarauer

Shadow Minister of Health
- In office November 4, 2020 – June 3, 2025
- Leader: Ryan Meili and Carla Beck

Member of the Saskatchewan Legislative Assembly for Saskatoon Fairview
- Incumbent
- Assumed office September 7, 2017
- Preceded by: Jennifer Campeau

Personal details
- Party: New Democrat

Vicki Mowat is a Canadian politician, who was elected to the Legislative Assembly of Saskatchewan in a by-election on September 7, 2017. She represents the electoral district of Saskatoon Fairview as a member of the Saskatchewan New Democratic Party.

== Biography ==
A former executive assistant to the associate dean of Aboriginal affairs at the University of Saskatchewan, she was also the party's candidate in the same district in the 2016 provincial election.

Vicki Mowat is a retired member of the Canadian Armed Forces, after serving in the Cadet Instructors Cadre – the branch of the Canadian Armed Forces that administers and trains the Cadet Program of Canada. Vicki Mowat served for several years at the Vernon Cadet Training Center, achieving the rank of Major.

As of 2026, she serves as the Deputy Leader of the Official Opposition.

== Electoral record ==
2020 Saskatchewan general election: Saskatoon Fairview
Party	Candidate	Votes	%	±%
New Democratic	Vicki Mowat	3,759	53.91	-6.53
Saskatchewan	Manny Sadhra	2,768	39.69	+8.52
Progressive Conservative	Tony Ollenberger	315	4.52	+1.83
Green	Tobi-Dawne Smith	131	1.88	+0.54
Total valid votes		6,973	99.01	
Total rejected ballots		70	0.99	+0.84
Turnout		7,043	47.20	+11.51
Eligible voters		14,923		
New Democratic hold		Swing		–
Source: Elections Saskatchewan

Saskatchewan provincial by-election, September 7, 2017: Saskatoon Fairview Resignation of Jennifer Campeau
Party	Candidate	Votes	%	±%
New Democratic	Vicki Mowat	2,759	60.44	+15.17
Saskatchewan	Cameron Scott	1,423	31.17	-17.07
Liberal	Shah Rukh	199	4.36	-0.68
Progressive Conservative	David Prokopchuk	123	2.69	-
Green	Taylor Bolin	61	1.34	-0.12
Total valid votes		4,565	99.85	
Total rejected ballots		7	0.15	-0.08
Turnout		4,572	35.69	-14.37
Eligible voters		12,809		
New Democratic gain from Saskatchewan		Swing		+16.12

2016 Saskatchewan general election: Saskatoon Fairview
Party	Candidate	Votes	%	±%
Saskatchewan	Jennifer Campeau	2,951	48.24	-2.74
New Democratic	Vicki Mowat	2,769	45.27	-0.95
Liberal	Shah Rukh	308	5.04	-
Green	Debbie McGraw	89	1.45	-1.34
Total valid votes		6,117	99.77	
Total rejected ballots		14	0.23	+0.11
Turnout		6,131	50.06	-11.11
Eligible voters		12,247		
Saskatchewan hold		Swing		-0.89
Source: Elections Saskatchewan
