= Robert Llewellyn Lyons =

Canadian politician

Robert Llewellyn Lyons (born January 19, 1948) is a pilot and former political figure in Saskatchewan. He represented Regina Rosemont from 1986 to 1995 in the Legislative Assembly of Saskatchewan as a New Democratic Party (NDP) member.

He was born in Truro, Nova Scotia, the son of Robert William Lyons and Goldye Patricia Williams, and was educated in Truro, at the Pictou Academy, at Queen's University and at the University of Regina. In 1971, he married Bernice Elaine Nystrom.

Presently voluntary reporter for Left Voice and married since 2016 with Marielos Ugalde Castro with 5 step-children in Costa Rica.
