= George Hara Williams =

Canadian politician

George Hara Williams MLA
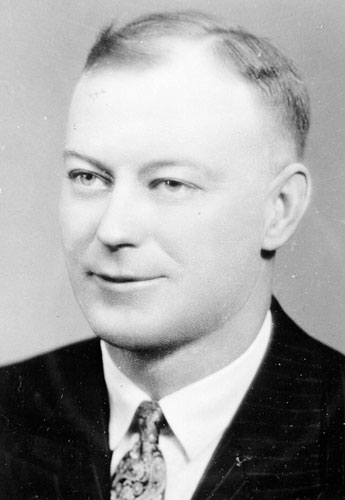
- Williams' official Cabinet picture, September 1944

Minister of Agriculture
- In office 1944–1945

Leader of the Opposition (Saskatchewan)
- In office 1934–1940
- Preceded by: James T.M. Anderson
- Succeeded by: John Hewgill Brockelbank

Personal details
- Born: November 17, 1894 Binscarth, Manitoba, Canada
- Died: September 12, 1945 (aged 50) Vancouver, British Columbia, Canada
- Party: Farmer-Labour Group/ Saskatchewan CCF

George Hara Williams (November 17, 1894 – September 12, 1945) was a Canadian farmer activist and politician.

== Biography ==
Born in Binscarth, Manitoba, Williams attended Manitoba Agricultural College after serving in World War I. Upon graduating, he moved to Saskatchewan to become director of livestock and equipment in the province for the federal Soldier Settlement Board.

He began farming himself and joined and became an organizer for the Farmers Union of Canada in 1923. He served as president of its successor, the United Farmers of Canada, from 1929 to 1931, and steered it towards political action. Williams brought a militant class struggle perspective to the organization. He was also involved with the Marxist Farmers' Educational League and was founder and secretary of the short-lived Farmers’ Political Association formed in 1924.

In 1932, he and M.J. Coldwell cochaired a convention that brought together the United Farmers of Canada (Saskatchewan Section) and the Independent Labour Party to form the new Farmer-Labour Group (FLG) with Coldwell as party leader. The party was recognized as the unofficial provincial branch of the new Co-operative Commonwealth Federation (CCF) shortly after the CCF was formed. The FLG contested the 1934 provincial election. Williams tried to deal with claims by the Liberals and Conservatives that the FLG/CCF in power would expropriate farmers' land in order to collectivize agriculture by stating repeatedly that "the basis of CCF land policy was a recognition of the family farm as the fundamental unit."

The FLG elected five MLAs to the Saskatchewan legislature, including Williams in the constituency of Wadena, and he formed the official opposition to the Liberal government. Coldwell did not win a seat in the legislature and Williams became Leader of the Opposition. The FLG officially affiliated with the national CCF and became the Saskatchewan CCF. In 1935, with Coldwell's election to the House of Commons of Canada, Williams became acting party leader and officially became party leader and president in 1936.

In 1931, Williams had served as a Canadian delegate to the World Wheat Conference and subsequently, under the auspices of the United Farmers of Canada, he visited the Soviet Union. The Soviet tour resulted in accusations that he was a Communist, and some CCFers came to believe he would be unable to take the party to power even after it doubled its share of seats in the 1938 general election under his leadership. The party moderated several of its policies and limited its policy on nationalization of industry to transportation, communications and power generation.

Williams's style and militancy alienated some party activists, who called on Tommy Douglas, a popular CCF MP in the House of Commons, to take over the provincial party leadership.

In 1941 Williams resigned his seat in the legislature to serve in the Canadian Army during World War II with the rank of Major in the Royal Canadian Ordnance Corps. John Hewgill Brockelbank, a Williams loyalist, became the CCF's house leader while Williams retained the party presidency and leadership. Douglas challenged Williams for the position of Saskatchewan CCF president at the 1941 party convention and was elected. In 1942, Douglas was elected party leader. Williams returned to Canada prior to the 1944 Saskatchewan election and helped rally rural support for the party in its successful election campaign. Williams was appointed Minister of Agriculture in the new CCF government, but he resigned in February 1945 for ill health. He died later that year in Vancouver.
