= Regina Mount Royal =

Saskatchewan electoral district

Provincial electoral district
- Legislature: Legislative Assembly of Saskatchewan
MLA
Trent Wotherspoon
New Democratic
- District created: 2022
- First contested: 2024
- Last contested: 2024
- Communities: Regina

Regina Mount Royal is a provincial electoral district for the Legislative Assembly of Saskatchewan, Canada.

== History ==
The riding was created by redistribution in 2022, and was created from portions of Regina Rosemont, Regina Pasqua and Lumsden-Morse.

== Members of the Legislative Assembly ==
Legislature	Years	Member	Party
Regina Rosemont, Regina Pasqua, Lumsden Morse
30th	2024-present	Trent Wotherspoon	New Democrat

== Election results ==
2024 Saskatchewan general election
Party	Candidate	Votes	%	±%
New Democratic	Trent Wotherspoon	4,945	60.6	+11.3
Saskatchewan	Jaspreet Mander	3,055	37.4	-6.2
Green	Regina Demyen	163	2.0	-0.7
Total valid votes		8,163		
Total rejected ballots				
Turnout				
Eligible voters		–		
Source: Elections Saskatchewan
New Democratic hold		Swing		

2020 provincial election redistributed results
Party	%
New Democratic	49.3
Saskatchewan	43.6
Green	2.7
