= Joanne Crofford =

Canadian politician

The Honourable Joanne Crofford ECS

MLA for Regina Lake Centre
- In office 1991–1995
- Succeeded by: riding dissolved

MLA for Regina Centre
- In office 1995–2003
- Preceded by: first member
- Succeeded by: riding dissolved

MLA for Regina Rosemont
- In office 2003 – November 20, 2007
- Succeeded by: Trent Wotherspoon

Personal details
- Born: October 29, 1947 Regina, Saskatchewan
- Party: New Democratic Party
- Spouse: Victor Crofford

Joanne Sharon Crofford (born October 29, 1947) is a former MLA for Regina Rosemont, Saskatchewan, and a member of the Saskatchewan New Democratic Party.

== Biography ==
She was born Joanne Sharon Elkin in Regina, the daughter of Hubert Elkin and Elsie Lillian Kozen. Crofford has lived and worked throughout Saskatchewan, including the North. She graduated from the University of Regina, majoring in Social Studies and Communications.

Crofford's 12 years of work in La Ronge included Assistant Director of Personnel with the Department of Northern Saskatchewan, representative to the provincial Environment Impact Assessment Secretariat and Business Manager of the Kikinahk Indian and Métis Friendship Centre. On her return to Regina, Crofford was Program Co-ordinator at the Rainbow Youth Centre and Research Co-ordinator at the Faculty of Social Work at the University of Regina.

Crofford was first elected in October 1991 as the MLA for Regina Lake Centre, and subsequently re-elected for Regina Centre and Regina Rosemont (due to boundary changes). Since her appointment to Cabinet in February 1995, Crofford has served in a wide variety of portfolios, including Minister Responsible for the Saskatchewan Property Management Corporation, Minister Responsible for the Status of Women, Minister Responsible for the Saskatchewan Liquor and Gaming Authority, Minister Responsible for the Indian and Métis Affairs Secretariat, Minister of Post-Secondary Education and Skills Training and Minister Responsible for the Saskatchewan Communications Network, Minister of Labour, Minister of Culture, Youth and Recreation, Minister Responsible for the Public Service Commission, as well as for the Wascana Centre Authority and the Saskatchewan Gaming Corporation.

Crofford was a candidate in the 2001 Saskatchewan New Democratic Party leadership election, which was held after Roy Romanow announced his intention to resign as party leader and premier. She placed sixth in a crowded field of seven candidates.

She was re-elected as the MLA for Regina Rosemont on November 5, 2003. On November 21, 2003, Crofford was appointed Minister of Community Resources and Employment, Minister Responsible for Disability Issues and as well as Minister Responsible for Gaming. In January 2006, Crofford announced that she would not run for re-election.

She has served in cultural, artistic, human rights, youth labour, business and community service organizations. She was chair of the Regina Opening Ceremonies event for the 1995 Grey Cup, founder of the Cathedral Village Drum Circle and continues to serve on the Cathedral Village Arts Festival and other community committees.

The Saskatchewan Centre of International Languages has awarded her an Honorary Certificate in Languages for her support of international language instruction.
