= Erin Weir =

Canadian politician (born 1982)

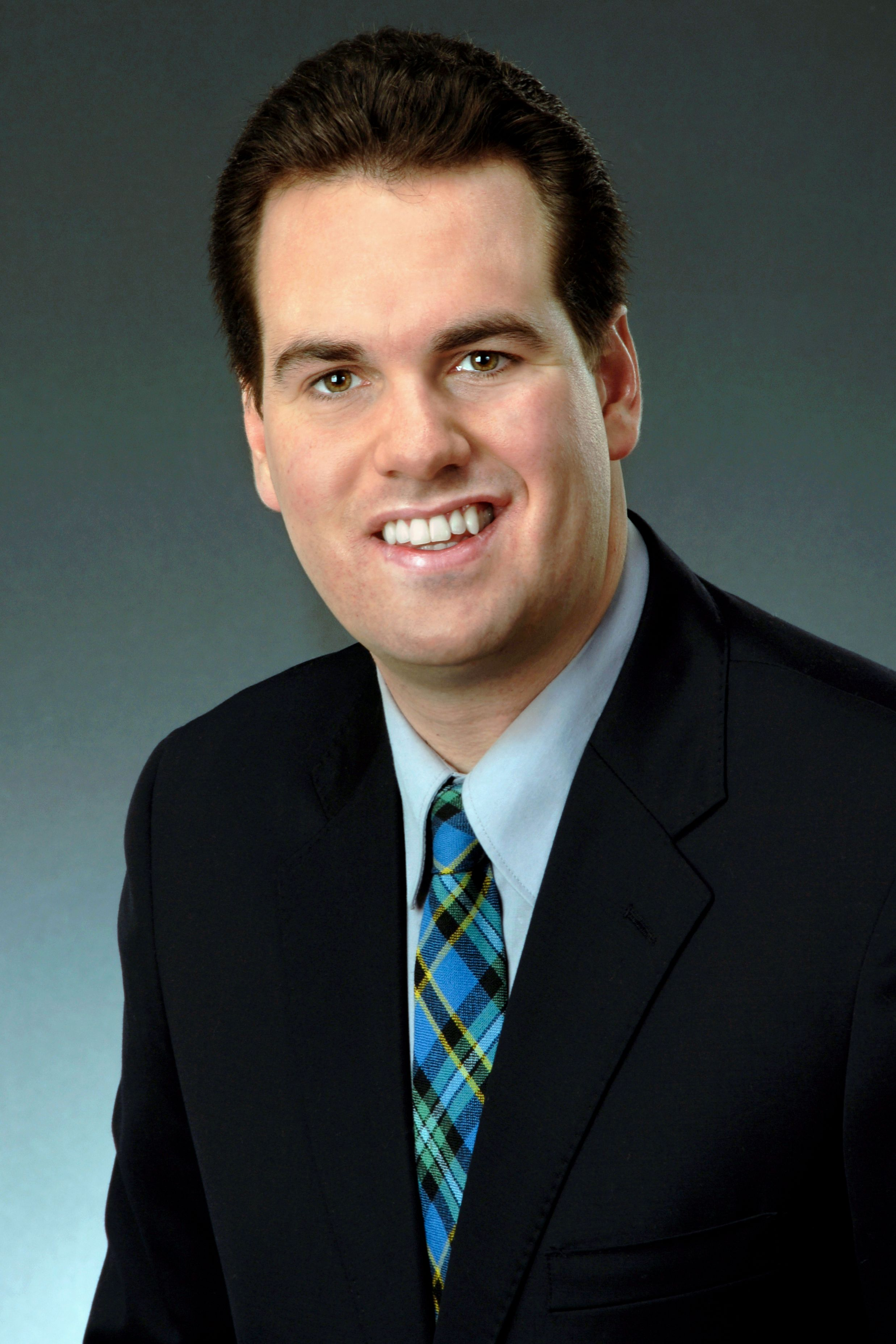

Member of Parliament for Regina—Lewvan
- In office October 19, 2015 – October 21, 2019
- Preceded by: Riding established
- Succeeded by: Warren Steinley

Personal details
- Born: 1982 (age 43–44) Saskatoon, Saskatchewan
- Party: NDP (2004–2018)
- Other political affiliations: CCF (2018–2019) (Note: Expelled from the NDP caucus following investigation into allegations of harassment, and subsequently changed his affiliation to the CCF. Although the CCF was dissolved in 1961, the House of Commons does not require that a party be registered with Elections Canada for the purposes of an MP declaring affiliation.)
- Education: University of Regina
- Profession: Economist
- Website: www.erinweir.ca

Erin M. K. Weir (born 1982) is a Canadian politician from Saskatchewan. From 2015 until 2019, he was Member of Parliament for the riding of Regina—Lewvan. Weir initially sat as a member of the federal New Democratic Party (NDP) but was expelled from the party's caucus on May 3, 2018 after a dispute over a third party investigation that sustained some claims of harassment. No appeal of this investigation was granted. Before entering federal politics, Weir ran in the 2013 Saskatchewan New Democratic Party leadership election and was an economist with the Canadian section of the United Steelworkers union.

Prior to his expulsion, Weir was appointed the NDP's critic for Public Services and Procurement Canada.

== Early life and career ==
Weir was born in 1982 in Saskatoon, Saskatchewan. Weir holds three university degrees: a Bachelor of Arts from the University of Regina, a Master of Arts from the University of Calgary, and a Master of Public Administration from Queen's University.

Weir began his career in Canada’s federal public service and went on to work as an economist with the Canadian Labour Congress, the United Steelworkers and the International Trade Union Confederation After completing his term in Parliament, Weir worked as a consultant, served as Senior Economist with the Alliance of Canadian Cinema, Television and Radio Artists (ACTRA), and wrote opinion pieces for The Globe and Mail national newspaper.

In May 2012 while Weir was an economist working with the United Steelworkers and presenting in front of the Parliamentary Finance committee, he was questioned by Conservative MP Randy Hoback – who asked "Are you now, or have you ever been, a member of the NDP party[sic]". CBC and Maclean's made comparisons to McCarthyism based on this line of questioning from Hoback.

== Political career ==
In 2004, Weir ran in the federal riding of Wascana against Liberal finance minister Ralph Goodale as the New Democratic Party's candidate, but was defeated.

=== 2013 Saskatchewan New Democratic Party leadership election ===
In June 2012 a group of Canadian economists sent a public letter calling on Erin Weir to enter the 2013 Saskatchewan New Democratic Party leadership election. Also a group of notable New Democrats including former NDP MP Dick Proctor and former NDP premier Howard Pawley of Manitoba created a "Committee to Draft Erin Weir".

On September 7, 2012 Weir, then aged 30, announced he was entering the race. He addressed the issue of his not having a seat by saying "I would see it advantageous as having a leader that is not tied down to Regina all the time and free to tour the province." He also made the comparison to Jack Layton and the federal NDP of the time. Earlier that week, he had addressed his age saying the age of the candidate should not be the focus of voters and that "Public policy is more important,".

He was one of four declared candidates including MLA Cam Broten, doctor Ryan Meili, and MLA Trent Wotherspoon.

His campaign was described by the media as organized and one of the main political commentators in the province said the race was "highly competitive" and "The fact they could all win is probably incentive for all four to run."

On February 20, 2013, Weir withdrew from the leadership race and endorsed fellow candidate Ryan Meili.

=== Federal politics ===
On April 11, 2014, Weir announced that he was seeking the NDP nomination in the new federal riding of Regina—Lewvan. He was nominated on June 22, 2014, defeating former 2011 Palliser federal NDP candidate Noah Evanchuk. He was elected on October 19, 2015, prevailing over Conservative candidate Trent Fraser by 132 votes according to the results validated by the Returning Officer. Fraser initially requested a recount, but the request was later withdrawn.

Weir was appointed the party's critic for Public Services and Procurement Canada in November 2015. He was also appointed as the Vice-Chair of the Standing Committee on Government Operations and Estimates in December 2015.

After the federal government announced a pan-Canadian price on carbon, Weir called for border adjustments to that pricing, pointing out that different carbon prices between countries can result in "carbon leakage". Weir's proposal was eventually adopted by Peter Julian, during his campaign for federal NDP Leader. Although internal debate about this proposal was characterized as “harassment,” carbon border adjustments subsequently appeared in the 2020 fall economic statement and 2021 federal budget.

Weir was one of the first MPs to raise the issue of problems with the new federal payroll system called Phoenix. Civilian employees at the RCMP's "Depot" Division living in his riding brought them to his attention.

=== Harassment allegations ===
In February 2018, Weir was suspended from his caucus duties by party leader Jagmeet Singh pending an independent investigation made into allegations made against him by fellow MP Christine Moore. Weir was expelled from the NDP caucus on May 3, 2018 following his public comments to the media regarding the outcome of the harassment investigation, with the party alleging that Weir had revealed confidential information about a complainant. Party spokespeople indicated that investigation found that claims of harassment were sustained by the evidence. Weir characterized the investigation as having found that he probably sat or stood too close to people at social events and tried to talk to them when they didn't want to talk. The media reported that "Three said Weir stood too close to them when talking and didn’t know when to shut up. The fourth said he had twice yelled at her over the issue of carbon tariffs — once during a policy debate and again later in an elevator."

As an independent member, Weir asked Speaker Geoff Regan to have his affiliation switched to the Co-operative Commonwealth Federation (CCF), the predecessor of the modern NDP. As the House of Commons does not require that a party be registered with Elections Canada for the purposes of MPs declaring affiliation, the affiliation change was accepted and Weir became the first CCF MP since 1961.

In May 2018, a group of 67 former NDP MPs and MLAs from Saskatchewan sent Singh a letter in support of Weir and calling for his reinstatement as an NDP MP. They criticized the federal party’s investigation as a “fishing expedition” that solicited complaints about Weir missing social cues. Singh dismissed these concerns on national television by describing the former members as “persons occupying positions of privilege” trying to “intimidate” him.

Former Saskatchewan NDP Finance Minister Eric Cline wrote in the National Post that "Weir had engaged in conduct described by an investigator as “on the low-end of the scale".

On September 6, 2018, it was publicly revealed that NDP Leader Singh had rejected Weir's request to rejoin the NDP during a meeting in June, despite Weir stating that he had worked with a personal trainer to understand the issues of the complaint.

Singh also said that Weir will not be permitted to run as an NDP candidate in the 2019 federal election. Although Weir had announced that he intended to seek the party's nomination in Regina—Lewvan, he retracted that statement, citing NDP Leader Singh's continued refusal for Weir to run for the party's nomination without appeal. Singh's stance did not change when a petition signed by nearly 3,000 people in Regina called for an appeal of the February investigation.

On May 21, 2019, Weir announced he would not run for reelection.

=== Electoral record ===
2015 Canadian federal election: Regina—Lewvan
Party	Candidate	Votes	%	±%	Expenditures
New Democratic	Erin Weir	16,843	35.21	-9.97	$92,223.66
Conservative	Trent Fraser	16,711	34.94	-8.93	$72,236.17
Liberal	Louis Browne	13,143	27.48	+19.28	$70,367.24
Green	Tamela Friesen	839	1.75	-1.00	$1,285.24
Libertarian	Wojciech K. Dolata	298	0.62	–	$5,634.21
Total valid votes/expense limit		47,834	99.62		$198,699.60
Total rejected ballots		181	0.38	–	
Turnout		48,015	77.64	–	
Eligible voters		64,325			
New Democratic notional hold		Swing		−0.52	
Source: Elections Canada

2004 Canadian federal election: Wascana
Party	Candidate	Votes	%	±%	Expenditures
Liberal	Ralph Goodale	20,567	57.2	+16.0	$43,226
Conservative	Doug Cryer	8,709	24.2	-11.9	$57,802
New Democratic	Erin M.K. Weir	5,771	16.0	-5.5	$29,783
Green	Darcy Robilliard	928	2.6		
Total valid votes		35,975	100.0		
Total rejected ballots		80	0.2	-0.1	
Turnout		36,055	63.1	+0.9	

Note: Conservative vote is compared to the Canadian Alliance vote in 2000 election.

== Post-political Career ==
After completing his term in Parliament, Weir worked as a consultant, served as Senior Economist with the Alliance of Canadian Cinema, Television and Radio Artists (ACTRA), and wrote opinion pieces for The Globe and Mail. His primary area of focus was on collecting a fair return for commodity extraction, arguing for a federal windfall tax on commodity producers and urging provinces to review their royalty rates.
