= Ryan Meili =

Canadian politician & physician (born 1975)

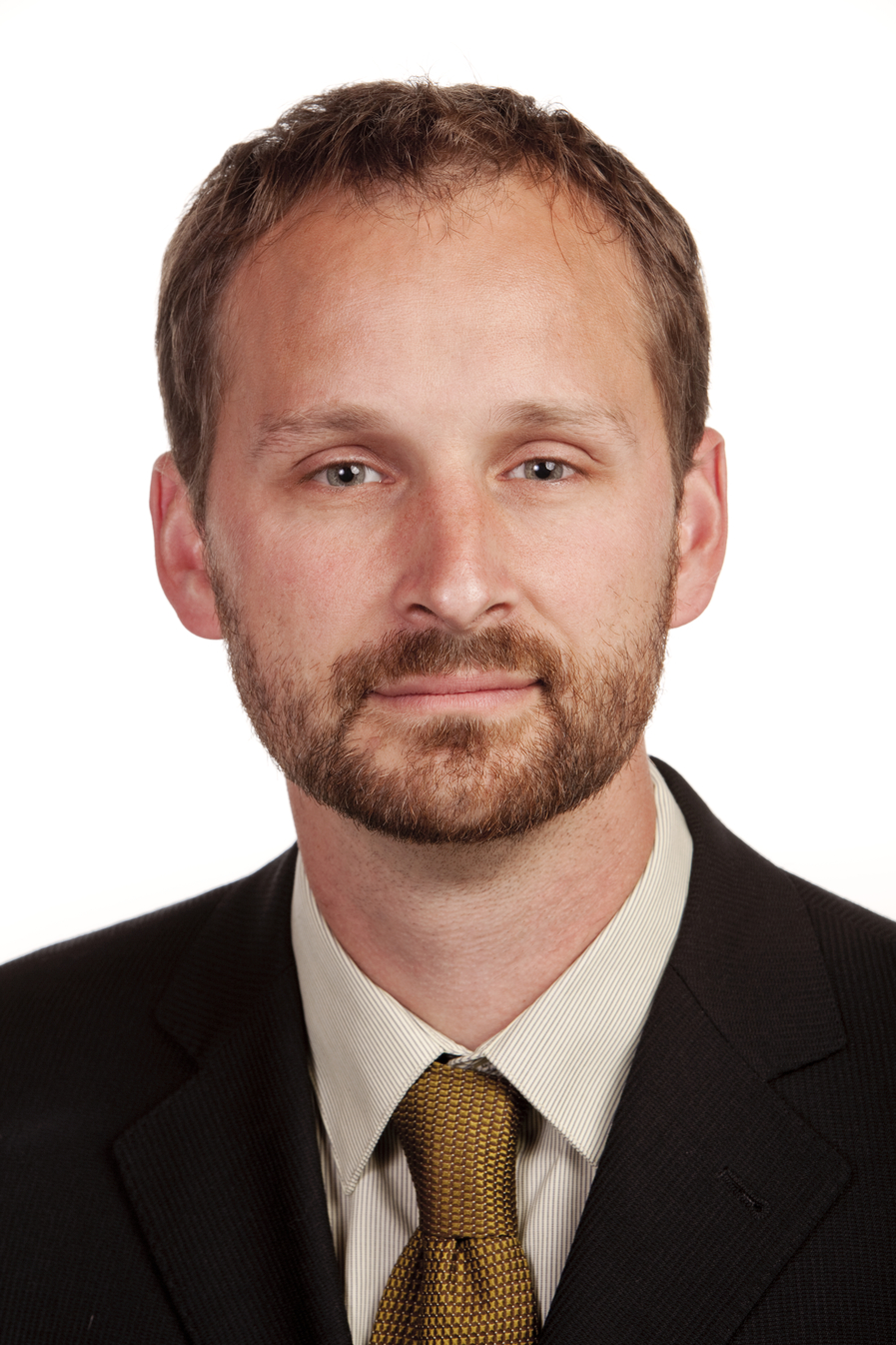
- Meili in 2013

Leader of the Opposition in Saskatchewan
- In office March 3, 2018 – June 26, 2022
- Preceded by: Nicole Sarauer
- Succeeded by: Carla Beck

Leader of the Saskatchewan New Democratic Party
- In office March 3, 2018 – June 26, 2022
- Preceded by: Nicole Sarauer (interim)
- Succeeded by: Carla Beck

Member of the Legislative Assembly for Saskatoon Meewasin
- In office March 2, 2017 – July 1, 2022
- Preceded by: Roger Parent
- Succeeded by: Nathaniel Teed

Personal details
- Born: April 11, 1975 (age 51) Moose Jaw, Saskatchewan, Canada
- Party: New Democratic
- Spouse: Mahli Brindamour
- Education: University of Saskatchewan
- Occupation: Physician

Ryan Meili (born April 11, 1975) is a Canadian physician and former politician from Saskatoon, Saskatchewan. He previously served as the Member of the Legislative Assembly (MLA) for Saskatoon Meewasin from 2017 to 2022 and as leader of the Saskatchewan New Democratic Party from 2018 to 2022. He has founded a number of health care-related initiatives such as the Student Wellness Initiative Toward Community Health (SWITCH), the University of Saskatchewan's Making the Links program, and the Upstream think tank.

== Early life and career ==
Meili was born in Moose Jaw, Saskatchewan and grew up on a family farm near Courval. He attended Vanier Collegiate in Moose Jaw before going on to the University of Saskatchewan (U of S) where he studied Human Anatomy and Languages. After finishing his first degree, Meili made an unsuccessful application to the U of S medical school. He then traveled to South America for five months, co-organizing a project called "Limbs and Light for Latin America." The project raised money to purchase a school bus, which was then filled with prosthetic limbs for landmine victims and driven to Nicaragua. In 2001, he traveled to Quebec City as part of a peaceful protest at the Summit of the Americas. He was arrested during the protest, but received an absolute discharge and had the conviction erased after one year.

Meili entered the College of Medicine at the University of Saskatchewan in September 2000 after his third application, and graduated in 2004. He completed his residency at the Westwinds Primary Health Centre in Saskatoon in June 2007. In addition to working as a physician at the West Side Community Clinic in Saskatoon, Meili began working for the U of S and as an advocate for doctors and health care. He became head of the College of Medicine's Division of Social Accountability and ran the College's Making the Links program, which coordinated practices for medical students in communities in inner-city Saskatoon, Northern Saskatchewan, and Mozambique. He acted as a coordinator for the Student Wellness Initiative Toward Community Health (SWITCH), which provided further opportunities for Saskatoon students to gain community-based experience. Meili also served as vice-chair for Canadian Doctors for Medicare, a national advocacy organization.

In 2012 Meili published A Healthy Society: How a Focus on Health can Revive Canadian Democracy, a book that explored the concept of the social determinants of health and argued for their role in the political process. Meili published an updated and expanded edition of the book in 2018. After publishing the first edition Meili founded and led a non-profit think tank called Upstream: Institute for a Healthy Society, which has since joined the Canadian Centre for Policy Alternatives.

== Political career ==
=== Early NDP leadership bids ===
Meili first became a member of the Saskatchewan New Democratic Party in 2001. Party leader Lorne Calvert's retirement in 2008 triggered a leadership election, and in February 2009 Meili decided to enter the race to replace the former premier. Meili was the fourth and final declared candidate in the race, joining former Deputy Premier Dwain Lingenfelter, Moose Jaw MLA Deb Higgins, and former party president Yens Pedersen. With no formal political experience, Meili was considered an outsider in the race. However, Meili ran a campaign that relied on grassroots volunteering and fundraising and focused on party renewal, and he placed a surprising second behind Lingenfelter, earning 45% of votes on the second and final ballot.

Following the convention, Meili announced that he intended to run for the NDP in the 2011 provincial election. In 2010, he sought the nomination for the riding of Saskatoon Sutherland. However, although Meili was perceived as the front runner for the nomination, he ultimately dropped out of the race, citing family reasons, and Naveed Anwar secured the nomination.

The 2011 election reduced the NDP to just 9 seats in the legislature, tied for their worst election result in history, and Lingenfelter lost his own seat and resigned as leader. This triggered a new leadership election, and in September 2012, Meili announced that he would again be seeking the leadership. In the race Meili was joined by Saskatoon MLA Cam Broten, Regina MLA Trent Wotherspoon, and Regina economist Erin Weir. Meili had greater notoriety in the race compared to 2009, and he based his campaign around the ideas presented in his book, A Healthy Society. When Weir dropped out ahead of the election and endorsed Meili, he was considered the front runner. At the election, he led on the first ballot by more than 400 votes. However, he ultimately finished second, losing to Broten by a slim margin of just 44 votes on the second ballot. Meili was lauded for expanding party membership during the race, and in particular for attracting young people to the party.

In 2014 Meili considered but ultimately declined to seek the federal NDP nomination for the riding of Saskatoon West ahead of the 2015 federal election.

=== MLA and NDP leader ===
The NDP gained just one seat in the 2016 election, and like Lingenfelter before him, Broten lost his own seat and resigned as party leader shortly after the election, triggering yet another leadership race. While Meili had by then run twice from outside the legislature, he announced in December 2016 that he would be seeking the nomination for a by-election to be held in the riding of Saskatoon Meewasin in 2017 after the death of MLA Roger Parent. Meili was successful in securing the nomination and he won the by-election in March 2017.

In May 2017, Meili announced that he would be joining the NDP leadership race to replace Broten. He was joined in the race by Wotherspoon, who had finished third behind Meili in 2013 and who acted as interim leader for a time after Broten's resignation. Meili ran on a platform including a $15 minimum wage, universal pharmacare, and the banning of corporate and union donations. Although Wotherspoon earned the endorsement of six NDP caucus members compared to just one for Meili, Meili was elected party leader with 55% of the vote in March 2018, joking afterwards that "third time's the charm." Meili became the 7th leader in the party's history and the first medical doctor to hold the position. His victory was considered a win for the progressive wing of the party.

As leader, Meili sought to strengthen the party ahead of the 2020 election. He attacked the governing Saskatchewan Party for the austerity they pursued after being re-elected in 2016, which included shutting down the Saskatchewan Transportation Company (STC) crown corporation. He sought to rebuild rural support for the party and to draw a contrast with the governing party by taking a stronger stance on climate change and renewable energy, announcing the Renew Saskatchewan program in the fall of 2018.

==== 2020 Provincial Election ====
In March 2020, it was rumoured that the governing Saskatchewan Party would call a snap election ahead of the scheduled election in the fall. Meili objected to the possibility in light of the emerging COVID-19 pandemic in Saskatchewan. He advocated for the creation of a multi-party committee, including both medical and economic experts, to guide the province's pandemic response after its first presumptive case that month, but the idea was rebuffed by Premier Scott Moe.

The 2020 general election ultimately proceeded according to the province's fixed-election law, taking place in October. The NDP, which entered the election holding 13 seats after gaining three in by-elections since the 2016 election, announced a variety of policies under the slogan of "Putting People First" including Renew Saskatchewan, a Saskatchewan-first procurement policy, and a $15 minimum wage by 2022. Meili also focused on reducing classroom sizes and wait times for medical procedures. The NDP also promised to revive the STC if elected.

In the election, the Saskatchewan Party was re-elected to a fourth consecutive majority government, while the NDP managed to win 13 seats, more than in the previous two elections but the same number of seats it entered the election with. The roster of NDP MLAs elected included six rookie candidates. Meili trailed in his own seat at the end of election day, but he ultimately won his seat in an election that saw a record number of mail-in ballots in the context of the pandemic. This bucked the trend of rookie NDP leaders losing their seats after Lingenfelter in 2011 and Broten in 2016.

After the election Meili vowed to stay on as MLA and leader despite disappointment with the result. Meili stated that his priority post-election would be continuing to deal with the pandemic, along with re-building the NDP's image. At the party convention in October 2021 Meili received 72% support in a leadership review, enough to avoid triggering a leadership contest, although it was noted to be well below the levels of support achieved by the Alberta and Manitoba NDP leaders in similar reviews; Rachel Notley, who backed Meili at the convention, received 98% support while Wab Kinew received 90%.

==== Resignation as NDP Leader and MLA ====
On February 18, 2022, Meili announced his intention to resign as NDP leader and trigger a leadership race, serving as leader until a new leader, Carla Beck, was chosen to succeed him at the 2022 Saskatchewan New Democratic Party leadership election. The announcement came two days after a by-election in the northern Athabasca riding saw the NDP lose the seat it had held since 1998. Meili stated that he felt that, with his medical background, he was needed as an opposition leader during the COVID-19 pandemic, but, as someone who had consistently advocated for robust public health measures it was time for a new voice in the party with the end of such measures in sight. Perceiving a fracture in support for the government, he argued that the NDP needed a leader who could both unify the caucus and the party ahead of the next election. On May 19, Meili announced that he would also be resigning as MLA for Saskatoon Meewasin effective July 1, leaving the party with just eleven seats in the Legislative Assembly.

== Post-provincial politics ==
In 2023 it was announced that Meili was releasing a new book, published by UBC Press, about the COVID-19 pandemic response in Saskatchewan. The book, titled A Healthy Future: Lessons from the Frontlines of a Crisis, details the impacts of the pandemic on the province and outlines possible lessons for future health crises.

== Personal life ==
Meili married pediatrician Mahli Brindamour in 2009, and the couple have two sons, Abraham and Augustin. Meili plays the guitar and is an avid skateboarder.

In April 2020, when the first wave of the COVID-19 pandemic was affecting Saskatchewan, Meili renewed his medical license and began working shifts at a testing and assessment centre in Saskatoon.

== Awards and honours ==
Meili has won numerous awards. He won the 2006 Saskatchewan Health Care Excellence Award and in 2007 was named Saskatoon’s Global Citizen of the Year by the Saskatchewan Council for International Cooperation. In 2014 he won the Award of Excellence from the College of Family Physicians of Canada. In 2015, he was awarded the University of Saskatchewan Alumni Achievement Award and the Distinguished Service Award from the College of Physicians and Surgeons of Saskatchewan.

== Published works ==
- Meili, Ryan. A Healthy Society: How a Focus on Health can Revive Canadian Democracy (Saskatoon: Purich Publishing Limited, 2012)
- Andrew Bresnahan, Mahli Brindamour, Christopher Charles, and Ryan Meili, eds. Upstream Medicine: Doctors for a Healthy Society (Vancouver: UBC Press, 2017)
- Meili, Ryan. A Healthy Society: How a Focus on Health can Revive Canadian Democracy, 2nd edition (Vancouver: Purich Books, 2018)
- Meili, Ryan. A Healthy Future: Lessons from the Frontlines of a Crisis (Vancouver: Purich Books, 2023)

== Electoral record ==
2020 Saskatchewan general election: Saskatoon Meewasin
Party	Candidate	Votes	%	±%
New Democratic	Ryan Meili	3,700	50.64	-3.51
Saskatchewan	Rylund Hunter	3,333	45.62	+5.77
Green	Jacklin Andrews	188	2.57	+1.49
Total valid votes		7,306	100.00	
Total rejected ballots			0.00	–
Turnout		–	–	–
Eligible voters		12,946		
Source: Elections Saskatchewan

Saskatchewan provincial by-election, March 2, 2017: Saskatoon Meewasin Death of Roger Parent
Party	Candidate	Votes	%	±%
New Democratic	Ryan Meili	2,666	54.15	+11.21
Saskatchewan	Brent Penner	1,962	39.85	-10.64
Liberal	Darrin Lamoureux	180	3.66	-0.77
Progressive Conservative	David Prokopchuk	62	1.26	-
Green	Shawn Setyo	53	1.08	-1.06
Total valid votes		4,923	100.00	
Total rejected ballots			–	
Turnout		4,923	40.62	-16.98
Eligible voters		12,121		
New Democratic gain from Saskatchewan		Swing		+10.92
