= Trent Wotherspoon =

Canadian politician (born 1979)

Trent Wotherspoon MLA

Member of the Legislative Assembly of Saskatchewan for Regina Mount Royal Regina Rosemont (2007-2024)
- Incumbent
- Assumed office November 7, 2007
- Preceded by: Joanne Crofford

Shadow Minister of Finance
- Incumbent
- Assumed office November 13, 2024
- Leader: Carla Beck

interim Leader of the Saskatchewan New Democratic Party Interim
- In office April 23, 2016 – June 20, 2017
- Preceded by: Cam Broten
- Succeeded by: Nicole Sarauer (interim)

Leader of the Opposition in Saskatchewan
- In office April 12, 2016 – June 20, 2017
- Preceded by: Cam Broten
- Succeeded by: Nicole Sarauer

Personal details
- Born: September 15, 1979 (age 46) Regina, Saskatchewan, Canada
- Party: Saskatchewan New Democrat
- Profession: Teacher

Trent Wotherspoon MLA is a Canadian politician and former interim leader of the Saskatchewan New Democratic Party (NDP). He was elected to represent the electoral district of Regina Rosemont in the Legislative Assembly of Saskatchewan in the 2007 election, and was re-elected in the 2011 election, and 2016 election. Wotherspoon was a candidate for the party's leadership in 2013. In 2016, the NDP caucus elected Wotherspoon to serve as Leader of the Opposition following the defeat of Cam Broten in the 2016 provincial election and the party's provincial council elected him interim leader.

== Early life ==
Wotherspoon was born in Regina where he lives with his wife Stephanie, a school teacher. Wotherspoon went to university at the University of Regina where he completed a Bachelor of Education degree. While at university, Wotherspoon also took classes in business administration. He also ran a painting company to help cover tuition.

Wotherspoon worked with the Regina Public Schools system where he helped to develop a new adult campus. He also helped implement a new holistic vocational adaptation program for students who displayed severe violent behaviours and lower cognitive abilities, and worked with the Ranch Ehrlo Society to provide addiction and behavioural treatment. Wotherspoon went on to create a youth justice program that helped high risk offenders. Also, he was a member of the Business Improvement District for the City of Regina's Warehouse District.

== Political career ==
Wotherspoon was elected in November 2007 and over the term became the opposition critic for Finance, SaskPower and SaskEnergy, as well as Chair of the Public Accounts committee, and committee member for Crown and Central Agencies and Saskatchewan's Commonwealth Parliamentary Association. Following the 2011 election Wotherspoon continued on as the critic for Finance and SaskPower and became the new critic for Education.

=== 2013 NDP leadership campaign ===
On September 14, 2012, Wotherspoon announced his candidacy for the leadership of the Saskatchewan NDP. He was one of three declared candidates including MLA Cam Broten and doctor Ryan Meili. A fourth candidate, economist Erin Weir, withdrew from the race before the leadership vote. At the leadership convention, Wotherspoon received the fewest votes on the first ballot and withdrew. Broten won on the second ballot by a narrow margin.

=== Interim leader ===
Wotherspoon was interim leader of the NDP, and leader of the opposition in the Saskatchewan legislature, from 2016 until June 2017 when he announced his resignation in order to consider seeking the permanent leadership of the party in the March 3, 2018 leadership election. MLA Ryan Meili was elected party leader with 55% of the vote in March 2018.

=== Post leadership ===
Wotherspoon was re-elected in the 2020 general election. As of June 22, 2024, he chairs the Public Accounts Committee of the Legislature and serves as the Official Opposition critic for Finance, SaskTel, Agriculture, the Saskatchewan Crop Insurance Corporation, Highways and Infrastructure, the Global Transportation Hub and the Regina Bypass, SaskBuilds and Procurement, and Affordability.

== Electoral record ==
=== Overview ===
Year	Type	Riding	Party	Votes for Wotherspoon				Result	Swing
Year	Type	Riding	Party	Total	%	P.	±%	Result	Swing
2007	Provincial general	Regina; Rosemont	New; Democratic	4,026	53.45%	1st	N/A	Won	Hold
2011	Provincial general	Regina; Rosemont	New; Democratic	3,567	54.85%	1st	+1.40%	Won	Hold
2016	Provincial general	Regina; Rosemont	New; Democratic	3,994	53.95%	1st	−0.90%	Won	Hold
2020	Provincial general	Regina; Rosemont	New; Democratic	4,102	57.86%	1st	+3.91%	Won	Hold

=== Provincial constituency elections ===
2007 Saskatchewan general election: Regina Rosemont
Party	Candidate	Votes	%	±%
New Democratic	Trent Wotherspoon	4,026	53.45	-8.61
Saskatchewan	Tony Fiacco	2,624	34.83	+13.14
Liberal	Jeff Raymond	667	8.85	-5.69
Green	Victoria Nelson	216	2.87	+1.76
Total		7,533	100.00	
New Democratic hold		Swing		–

2011 Saskatchewan general election: Regina Rosemont
Party	Candidate	Votes	%	±%
New Democratic	Trent Wotherspoon	3,567	54.85	+1.4
Saskatchewan	Tony Fiacco	2,745	42.21	+7.38
Green	Allan Kirk	191	2.94	-0.94
Total		6,503	100.00	
New Democratic hold		Swing		–

2016 Saskatchewan general election: Regina Rosemont
Party	Candidate	Votes	%	±%
New Democratic	Trent Wotherspoon	3,994	53.95	-0.90
Saskatchewan	Kevin Dureau	3,101	41.88	-0.33
Liberal	Reid A. L. Hill	162	2.18	-
Green	Sara Piotrofsky	146	1.97	-0.04
Total valid votes		7,403	100.0	
Eligible voters		–		
New Democratic hold		Swing		–
Source: Elections Saskatchewan

2020 Saskatchewan general election: Regina Rosemont
Party	Candidate	Votes	%	±%
New Democratic	Trent Wotherspoon	4,102	57.86	+3.91
Saskatchewan	Alex Nau	2,522	35.58	-6.30
Progressive Conservative	Christopher McCulloch	295	4.16	-
Green	James Park	170	2.40	+0.43
Total valid votes		7,089	98.90	
Total rejected ballots		79	1.10	–
Turnout		7,168	53.55	–
Eligible voters		13,385		
New Democratic hold		Swing		–
Source: Elections Saskatchewan
