= Regina Rosemont =

Provincial electoral district in Saskatchewan, Canada

Saskatchewan electoral district
- Coordinates: 50.468°N 104.668°W

Defunct provincial electoral district
- Legislature: Legislative Assembly of Saskatchewan
- First contested: 1975
- Last contested: 2020
- Communities: Regina

Regina Rosemont was a former provincial electoral district for the Legislative Assembly of Saskatchewan, Canada. It is represented by Trent Wotherspoon of the New Democratic Party, who first won the seat in the 2007 election. The riding was dissolved before the 2024 general election with the bulk of the population transferred to Regina Mount Royal.

== Members of the Legislative Assembly ==
Legislature	Years	Member	Party
18th	1975–1978	Bill Allen	New Democrat
19th	1978–1982	Bill Allen	New Democrat
20th	1982–1986	Gordon Dirks	Progressive Conservative
21st	1986–1991	Robert Lyons	New Democrat
22nd	1991–1995	Robert Lyons	New Democrat
Riding divided into Regina Elphinstone, Regina Centre, Regina Coronation Park and Regina Sherwood (1995–2003)
25th	2003–2007	Joanne Crofford	New Democrat
26th	2007–2011	Trent Wotherspoon	New Democrat
27th	2011–2016	Trent Wotherspoon	New Democrat
28th	2016–2020	Trent Wotherspoon	New Democrat
29th	2020–2024	Trent Wotherspoon	New Democrat

== Election results ==
=== 2003–present ===
2020 Saskatchewan general election
Party	Candidate	Votes	%	±%
New Democratic	Trent Wotherspoon	4,102	57.86	+3.91
Saskatchewan	Alex Nau	2,522	35.58	-6.30
Progressive Conservative	Christopher McCulloch	295	4.16	-
Green	James Park	170	2.40	+0.43
Total valid votes		7,089	98.90	
Total rejected ballots		79	1.10	–
Turnout		7,168	53.55	–
Eligible voters		13,385		
New Democratic hold		Swing		–
Source: Elections Saskatchewan

2016 Saskatchewan general election
Party	Candidate	Votes	%	±%
New Democratic	Trent Wotherspoon	3,994	53.95	-0.90
Saskatchewan	Kevin Dureau	3,101	41.88	-0.33
Liberal	Reid A. L. Hill	162	2.18	-
Green	Sara Piotrofsky	146	1.97	-0.04
Total valid votes		7,403	100.0	
Eligible voters		–		
New Democratic hold		Swing		–
Source: Elections Saskatchewan

2011 Saskatchewan general election
Party	Candidate	Votes	%	±%
New Democratic	Trent Wotherspoon	3567	54.85	+1.4
Saskatchewan	Tony Fiacco	2745	42.21	+7.38
Green	Allan Kirk	191	2.94	-0.94
Total		6503	100.00	
New Democratic hold		Swing		–

2007 Saskatchewan general election
Party	Candidate	Votes	%	±%
New Democratic	Trent Wotherspoon	4,026	53.45	-8.61
Saskatchewan	Tony Fiacco	2,624	34.83	+13.14
Liberal	Jeff Raymond	667	8.85	-5.69
Green	Victoria Nelson	216	2.87	+1.76
Total		7,533	100.00	
New Democratic hold		Swing		–

2003 Saskatchewan general election
Party	Candidate	Votes	%	±%
New Democratic	Joanne Crofford	4,226	62.06	–
Saskatchewan	Morris Elfenbaum	1,477	21.69	–
Liberal	Sherry Banadyga	990	14.54	–
New Green	Victor Lau	76	1.11	–
Progressive Conservative	Vanessa Slater	41	0.60	–
Total		6,810	100.00	

=== 1991 ===
1991 Saskatchewan general election
Party	Candidate	Votes	%
New Democratic	Bob Lyons	6,406	65.23
Liberal	John M. MacGowan	2,383	24.27
Progressive Conservative	Myrna Petersen	1,031	10.50
Total valid votes		9,820	99.79
Total rejected ballots		21	0.21
Turnout		9,841	85.23
Eligible voters		11,546	

== See also ==
- List of Saskatchewan provincial electoral districts
- List of Saskatchewan general elections
- Canadian provincial electoral districts
