= Nicole Sarauer =

Canadian politician

Nicole Sarauer MLA

House Leader of the Saskatchewan New Democratic Party
- Incumbent
- Assumed office October 5, 2022
- Leader: Carla Beck
- Preceded by: Vicki Mowat

Critic, Justice; the Saskatchewan Liquor and Gaming Authority and SaskGaming; Corrections and Policing; and the Provincial Capital Commission
- Incumbent
- Assumed office November 4, 2020

Leader of the Opposition in Saskatchewan
- In office June 20, 2017 – March 3, 2018
- Preceded by: Trent Wotherspoon
- Succeeded by: Ryan Meili

Leader of the Saskatchewan New Democratic Party Interim
- In office June 20, 2017 – March 3, 2018
- Preceded by: Trent Wotherspoon
- Succeeded by: Ryan Meili

Deputy House Leader of the Saskatchewan New Democratic Party
- In office April 21, 2016 – September 29, 2020

Deputy Leader of the Saskatchewan New Democratic Party
- In office November 4, 2020 – October 5, 2022
- Succeeded by: Vicki Mowat

Member of the Saskatchewan Legislative Assembly for Regina Douglas Park
- Incumbent
- Assumed office April 4, 2016
- Preceded by: Russ Marchuk

Personal details
- Born: 1986 or 1987 (age 39–40)
- Party: Saskatchewan New Democratic Party
- Children: 2
- Education: University of Regina, University of Saskatchewan
- Profession: Lawyer

Nicole Sarauer is a Canadian politician, who was elected to the Legislative Assembly of Saskatchewan in the 2016 provincial election. She represents the electoral district of Regina Douglas Park as a member of the Saskatchewan New Democratic Party. On June 20, 2017, she was selected to succeed Trent Wotherspoon as Leader of the Opposition and interim leader of the Saskatchewan New Democratic Party.

== Education ==
Having attended high school in Regina, Nicole Sarauer studied at the University of Regina from 2004 to 2006. She then continued her education, graduating with Honours from the College of Law at the University of Saskatchewan in 2009, earning a Juris Doctor.

== Career ==
After finishing her studies, Sarauer worked at the law firm Kanuka Thuringer LLP as an Associate. In 2011, she became a lawyer at Pro Bono Law Saskatchewan, providing legal representation free of charge. She was also elected School Board Trustee of the Regina Catholic School Division in 2012.

Since being elected in 2016, she has served as the Critic for Justice and Policing & Corrections in the opposition NDP caucus. Additionally, she recently had the portfolios of the Provincial Capital Commission (including Wascana Park) and the Saskatchewan Liquor and Gaming Commission (which now includes the cannabis file).

Aside from her stint as Leader of the Opposition, Sarauer has served under Ryan Meili's leadership as both Opposition House Leader and, presently, as the Deputy Leader of the Opposition and Saskatchewan NDP.

As of June 22, 2024, she serves as the Official Opposition critic for Justice and Attorney General; for Corrections, Policing, and Public Safety; for the Provincial Capital Commission; and for Labour. She also serves as the House Leader of the Official Opposition.

== Electoral record ==
2020 Saskatchewan general election: Regina Douglas Park
Party	Candidate	Votes	%	±%
New Democratic	Nicole Sarauer	3,545	60.14	+10.31
Saskatchewan	Nadeem Naz	1,808	30.67	-8.23
Progressive Conservative	Sara Healey	331	5.61	-
Green	Victor Lau	211	3.58	-2.58
Total valid votes		5,895	98.88	
Total rejected ballots		67	1.12	–
Turnout		5,962	46.01	–
Eligible voters		12,958		
New Democratic hold		Swing		–
Source: Elections Saskatchewan

2016 Saskatchewan general election: Regina Douglas Park
Party	Candidate	Votes	%	±%
New Democratic	Nicole Sarauer	3,242	49.83	+8.49
Saskatchewan	C.J. Katz	2,531	38.90	-13.10
Green	Victor Lau	401	6.16	-0.50
Liberal	Curt Schroeder	332	5.10	-
Total valid votes		6,506	100.0	
Eligible voters		–		
New Democratic gain from Saskatchewan		Swing		–
Source: Elections Saskatchewan
