= Carla Beck =

Canadian politician (born 1973)

Carla Beck MLA
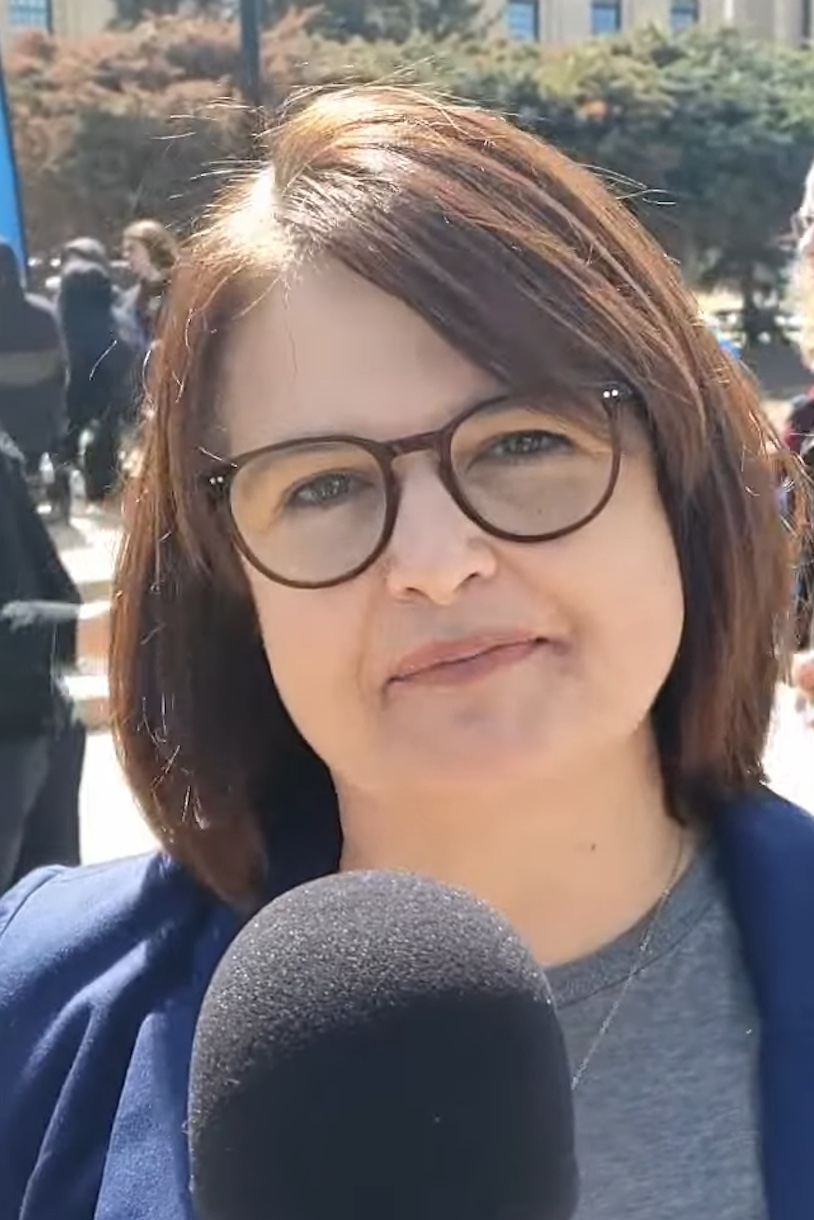
- Beck in 2023

Leader of the Opposition in Saskatchewan
- Incumbent
- Assumed office June 26, 2022
- Preceded by: Ryan Meili

Shadow Minister of Agriculture
- Incumbent
- Assumed office November 13, 2024
- Deputy: Trent Wotherspoon

Leader of the Saskatchewan New Democratic Party
- Incumbent
- Assumed office June 26, 2022
- Deputy: Vicki Mowat
- Preceded by: Ryan Meili

Member of the Legislative Assembly of Saskatchewan for Regina Lakeview
- Incumbent
- Assumed office April 4, 2016
- Preceded by: John Nilson

Personal details
- Born: October 15, 1973 (age 52) Weyburn, Saskatchewan, Canada
- Party: New Democratic
- Spouse: Guy Marsden
- Children: 3
- Education: University of Regina
- Profession: Social worker
- Portfolio: Education, Labour, Childcare, Early Learning

Carla Beck (born October 15, 1973) is a Canadian politician who has served as leader of the Saskatchewan New Democratic Party and Saskatchewan's Official Opposition since 2022. Beck was first elected to the Legislative Assembly of Saskatchewan for the district of Regina Lakeview in the 2016 provincial election. Beck is the first elected female leader of the Saskatchewan NDP.

== Background and early career ==
Carla Beck was born in Weyburn and grew up on a mixed farm near Lang, Saskatchewan. Beck's paternal great grandparents immigrated to Saskatchewan from Iowa, and her grandfather was born in Saskatchewan in 1914. Beck attended elementary school in Lang and high school in the neighbouring community of Milestone. Beck played baseball in her youth, and in 2019 her family was inducted into the Saskatchewan Baseball Hall of Fame for their extensive impact on the sport in the province. The community ball diamond in Lang is named Beck Field after the family.

Beck graduated with two bachelors degrees from the University of Regina: a Sociology degree in 1998 and a Social Work degree in 2004. Beck worked as a social worker in Regina for more than two decades, including working with the Regina General Hospital and as an assistant executive director at a women's shelter. Beck also worked as an active community volunteer, including through the Saskatchewan Abilities Council, the Saskatchewan Coalition Against Racism, Camp Easter Seal, the Autism Resource Centre, and the MS Society. In 2007, Beck became a founding member and spokesperson for RealRenewal, a coalition of parents and community members formed in response to the Regina public school board’s "10-Year Renewal Plan", which could have led to the closure of more than a dozen inner city schools; the school board plan was ultimately abandoned in the face of community opposition before it was fully implemented.

== Political career ==
Beck's initial foray into politics was with the public school board. Following her advocacy against the Regina public school board's restructuring plan, Beck was elected in 2009 as the Trustee for Subdivision 5 on the Regina public school board, a role in which Beck would ultimately serve two terms.

In 2015, Beck won a contested NDP nomination race for the Regina Lakeview constituency. Beck was elected to the Legislative Assembly in the 2016 provincial election. In the 2020 provincial election, Beck was re-elected by a wide margin with 65.5% of the vote in Regina Lakeview. Starting in 2016, Beck served as the Opposition critic for Education, Early Learning and Child Care. Beck also served as the Deputy Leader of the Opposition, Opposition Caucus Chair and the critic for Labour. Beck also served as the Education critic during the COVID-19 pandemic in Saskatchewan.

=== NDP leader ===
On March 3, 2022, Beck announced her candidacy in the 2022 Saskatchewan NDP leadership election, receiving endorsements from former interim party leaders Trent Wotherspoon and Nicole Sarauer. At the party convention in Regina on June 26, 2022, Beck won the election to become the party's first elected female leader.

With Beck as leader, the Saskatchewan NDP won two Regina by-elections in August 2023. In Beck's first full year as leader, she identified cost-of-living concerns and healthcare as the major issues facing people in the province. Beck also emphasized accountability and criticized the governing Saskatchewan Party on this front, including by triggering conflict-of-interest investigations against Saskatchewan Party MLAs Jeremy Cockrill and Gary Grewal in 2024.

On August 29, 2024, Beck launched the NDP's campaign ahead of the 2024 provincial election with a focus on cost-of-living by making a pledge to not increase income, business, sales, or corporate taxes; Beck emphasized that its financial plans would include cutting wasteful government spending. For instance, Beck committed to scrapping the controversial rollout of the Saskatchewan Marshals police service, which was slated to cost the province $20 million annually. The following week, and in the wake of protracted job action on the part of Saskatchewan teachers, Beck unveiled a commitment to increase education funding by $2 billion over four years. Adding commitments to pause the provincial gas tax, to launch a school nutrition program, and to target organized crime, Beck's campaign drew comparisons to the successful 2023 campaign of the Manitoba NDP. When Beck released the party's full platform, it also included a $1 billion commitment over four years to the healthcare sector.

The NDP saw a late surge in polling during the campaign, with multiple polls suggesting the party was in a position to win the election. Ultimately, the party fell short of a victory but more than doubled its seat count compared to the 2020 election, winning 27 seats. This was mainly on the strength of taking all of Regina and all but one seat in Saskatoon; it was the NDP's best election result since 2003.

Following Avi Lewis's victory in the 2026 New Democratic Party leadership election, Beck criticized the federal party's energy policy under Lewis.

== Personal life ==
Beck is married to Guy Marsden, and together they have three children. Beck has been an avid volunteer in community sports, including in baseball, hockey, and soccer.

Her nephew is Carter Beck, a professional baseball player in the Atlanta Braves organization.

== Electoral results ==
2020 Saskatchewan general election: Regina Lakeview
Party	Candidate	Votes	%
New Democratic	Carla Beck	4,739	65.47
Saskatchewan	Megan Patterson	2,194	30.31
Green	Michael Wright	202	2.79
Liberal	Bruno Sahut	103	1.42
Total valid votes		7,238	99.99
Source: Elections Saskatchewan

2016 Saskatchewan general election: Regina Lakeview
Party	Candidate	Votes	%
New Democratic	Carla Beck	4,358	56.48
Saskatchewan	Dan Cooper	2,715	35.19
Liberal	Stewart Kerr	391	5.06
Green	Keith Morvick	251	3.25
Total valid votes		7,715	99.98
Source: Saskatchewan Archives - Election Results by Electoral Division; Elections Saskatchewan
