= 2011 Saskatchewan general election =

Canadian provincial election

- November 7, 2011

58 seats in the Legislative Assembly of Saskatchewan 30 seats needed for a majority
- Opinion polls
- Turnout: 66.7% (▼9.3pp)
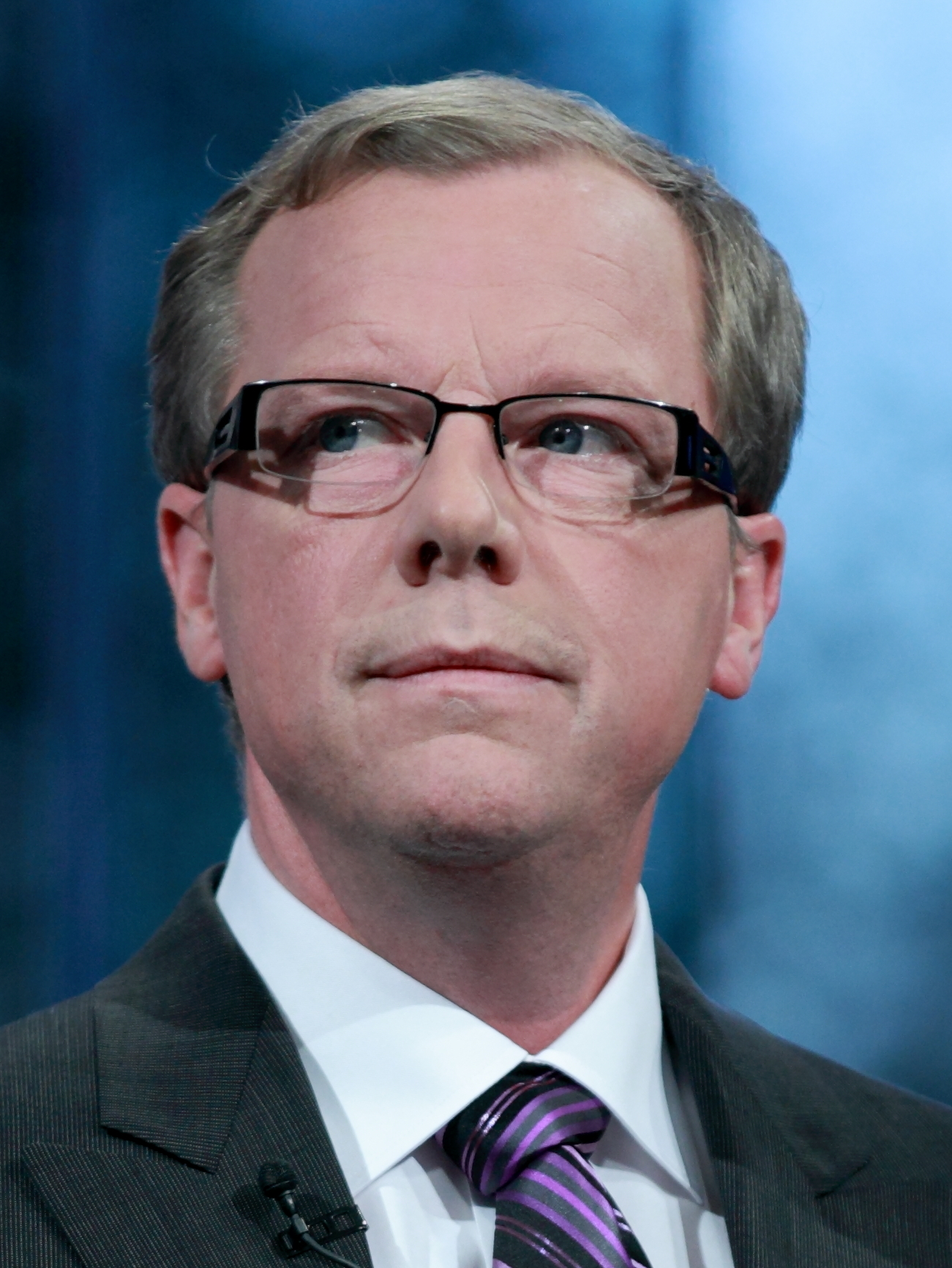

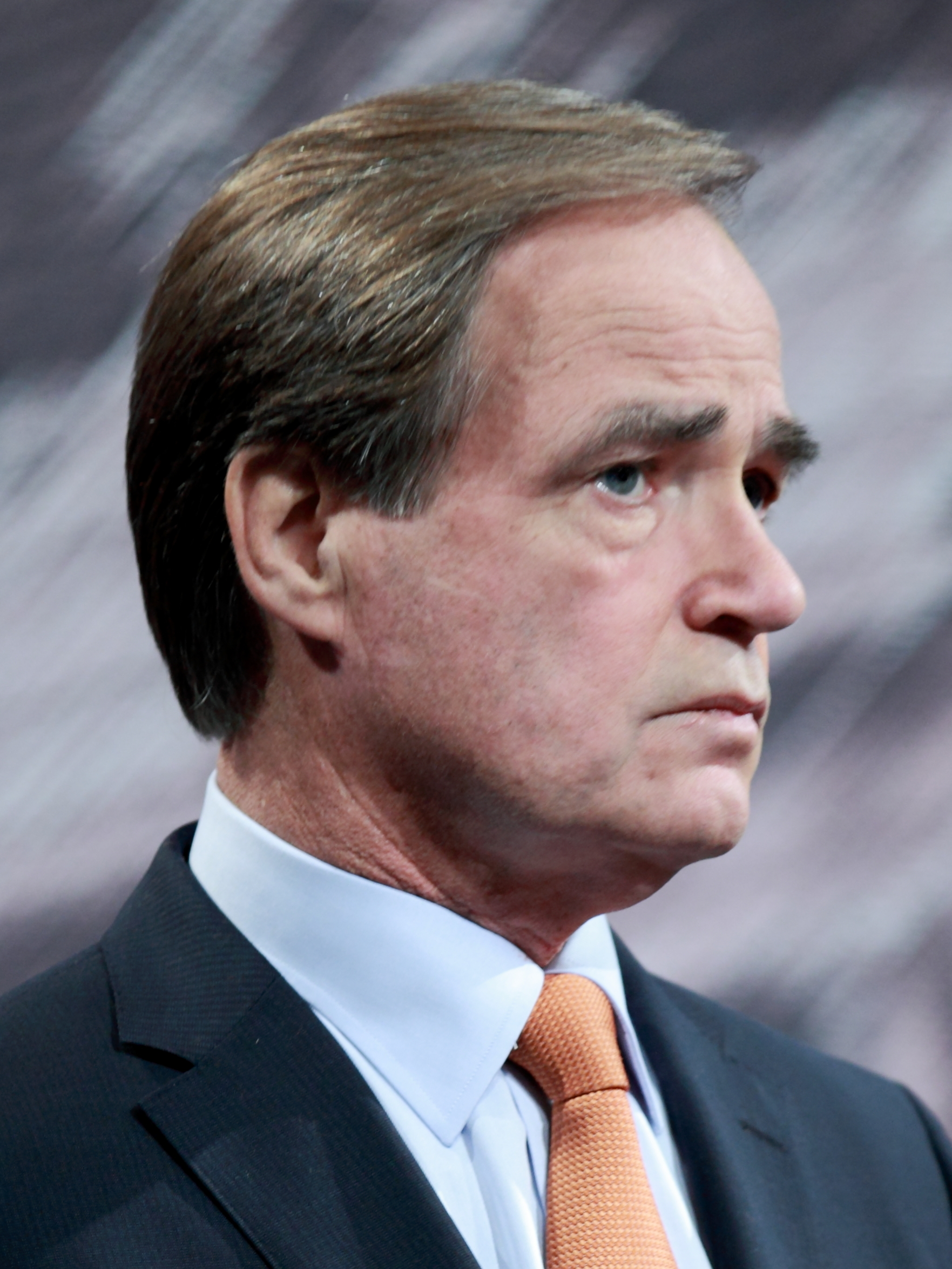
	First party	Second party
Leader	Brad Wall	Dwain Lingenfelter
Party	Saskatchewan	New Democratic
Leader since	March 15, 2004	June 6, 2009
Leader's seat	Swift Current	Regina Douglas Park (lost re-election)
Last election	38 seats, 50.92%	20 seats, 37.24%
Seats before	38	20
Seats won	49	9
Seat change	▲11	▼11
Popular vote	258,598	128,673
Percentage	64.25%	31.97%
Swing	▲13.33pp	▼5.27pp
- Popular vote by riding. As this is an FPTP election, seat totals are not determined by popular vote, but instead via results by each riding.
Premier before election
Brad Wall
Saskatchewan
Premier after election
Brad Wall
Saskatchewan

The 2011 Saskatchewan general election was held on November 7, 2011, to elect 58 members of the Legislative Assembly of Saskatchewan (MLAs). The election was called on October 10 by the Lieutenant Governor of Saskatchewan, on the advice of Premier Brad Wall. Wall's Saskatchewan Party government was re-elected with an increased majority of 49 seats, the third-largest majority government in the province's history. The opposition New Democratic Party was cut down to only nine ridings, its worst showing in almost 30 years.

This was the first Saskatchewan provincial vote to use a fixed election date, set on the first Monday of November every four years.

== Results ==
On election night, the incumbent Saskatchewan Party won 84% of the seats in the provincial legislature on the strength of 64% of the popular vote. In the process, they won the third-biggest majority government (in terms of percentage of seats won) in the province's history. The only bigger majorities came in 1934, when the Liberals won 50 out of 55 seats, and 1982, when the Tories won 55 out of 64. The NDP recorded its lowest share of the popular vote since 1938, when it was known as the Saskatchewan Co-operative Commonwealth Federation. The NDP was reduced to its smallest presence in the legislature since 1982, when the party won the same number of seats in what was then a larger assembly. Opposition leader Dwain Lingenfelter was unseated.

The Saskatchewan Party maintained their dominance of rural regions, and also broke the NDP's longstanding grip on the province's two largest cities, Regina and Saskatoon. The Green Party failed to win any seats – though they ran a full slate of 58 candidates and took third place in the overall popular vote, ahead of the Liberal Party. The Liberals put most of their resources into getting party leader Ryan Bater elected in the Battlefords, but he finished a distant third. The Progressive Conservatives made a small gain in popular vote for the second straight election.

Summary of the Legislative Assembly of Saskatchewan election results
Party	Party leader	Candidates	Seats				Popular vote		
Party	Party leader	Candidates	2007	Dissol.	2011	Change	#	%	Change
Saskatchewan	Brad Wall	58	38	38	49	+11	258,598	64.25	+13.33
New Democratic	Dwain Lingenfelter	58	20	20	9	-11	128,673	31.97	-5.27
Green	Victor Lau	58	0	0	0	–	11,561	2.87	+0.86
Liberal	Ryan Bater	9	0	0	0	–	2,237	0.56	-8.84
Progressive Conservative	Rick Swenson	5	0	0	0	–	1,315	0.33	+0.15
Western Independence	Dana Arnason	2	0	0	0	–	58	0.01	-0.12
Independent		1	0	0	0	–	44	0.01	
Total		191	58	58	58		402,486	100.00	

=== Percentages ===
Popular vote
Saskatchewan	64.25%
New Democratic	31.97%
Green	2.87%
Liberal	0.56%
Others	0.35%

Seats summary
Saskatchewan	84.48%
New Democratic	15.52%

=== Ranking ===
Party	Seats	Second	Third	Fourth	Fifth
Saskatchewan	49	9	0	0	0
New Democratic	9	49	0	0	0
Green	0	0	52	6	0
Liberal	0	0	3	6	0
Progressive Conservative	0	0	3	2	0
Western Independence	0	0	0	1	1

=== Results by region ===
The Saskatchewan Party maintained their sweep of the southern and central rural ridings. The Saskatchewan Party succeeded in unseating New Democrats in all of the smaller cities – including Moose Jaw, The Battlefords, and Prince Albert. The Saskatchewan Party also won eight of the 12 ridings in Saskatoon, marking the first time since the 1982 PC landslide that a centre-right party had won the most seats in that city. This didn't come as a surprise, since Saskatoon has traditionally been friendly to centre-right parties and candidates. However – and perhaps most surprisingly – the Saskatchewan Party also took eight out of 11 ridings in Regina, in part due to picking up local support from the largely absent Liberal Party. As was the case in Saskatoon, this was the first time a centre-right party had won the most seats there since 1982.

The New Democratic Party maintained their hold on the two northernmost ridings in Saskatchewan, in addition to three seats in the provincial capital and four constituencies in Saskatoon. The NDP recorded the lowest share of the popular vote since 1938 (when it was known as the CCF). However, compared to its result in 1982, NDP support in 2011 was more concentrated in the North and the inner cities of Regina and Saskatoon, a factor which allowed the party to equal its 1982-seat tally (and indeed exceed it in terms of proportion of seats). Also, for the first time in history, a Saskatchewan NDP leader lost his own seat, with Dwain Lingenfelter losing by a shocking 10-percentage-point margin in Regina Douglas Park to a Saskatchewan Party challenger.

Party Name		Northern	Prince Albert	Central	Southern	Moose Jaw	Saskatoon	Regina	Total
Saskatchewan	Seats:	11	2	6	12	2	8	8	49
Saskatchewan	Popular Vote:	63.58%	55.79%	76.58%	76.78%	54.67%	58.21%	55.69%	64.25%
New Democratic	Seats:	2	0	0	0	0	4	3	9
New Democratic	Popular Vote:	32.81%	41.64%	19.67%	19.71%	40.34%	37.53%	40.60%	31.97%
Green	Popular Vote:	2.58%	2.57%	3.27%	2.91%	1.46%	2.87%	3.22%	2.87%
Liberal	Popular Vote:	1.03%	xx	xx	xx	xx	1.39%	0.21%	0.56%
Progressive Conservative	Popular Vote:	xx	xx	0.41%	0.56%	3.53%	xx	0.23%	0.33%
Western Independence	Popular Vote:	xx	xx	0.07%	0.04%	xx	xx	xx	0.01%
Independents	Popular Vote:	xx	xx	xx	xx	xx	xx	0.05%	0.01%
Total seats:		13	2	6	12	2	12	11	58

== Timeline ==
=== 2007 ===
- November 21, 2007 – Premier Brad Wall & Cabinet Ministers are sworn in.

=== 2008 ===
- January 3, 2008 – NDP MLA Joan Beatty announces she will resign her seat in Cumberland to enter federal politics.
- June 25, 2008 – Doyle Vermette holds the seat of Cumberland for the New Democrats.
- October 16, 2008 – NDP Leader Lorne Calvert announces he will retire from politics as soon as his successor is chosen.

=== 2009 ===
- May 29, 2009 – Premier Brad Wall shuffles his Cabinet.
- June 6, 2009 – Dwain Lingenfelter is elected Leader of the Saskatchewan NDP over Ryan Meili on the second ballot.
- June 30, 2009 – NDP MLA Harry Van Mulligen resigns his seat in Regina Douglas Park, officially retiring from politics. Lorne Calvert resigns his seat in Saskatoon Riversdale the same day.
- September 21, 2009 – Dwain Lingenfelter & Danielle Chartier hold the constituencies of Regina Douglas Park & Saskatoon Riversdale, respectively, for the NDP.
- October 21, 2009 – Dwain Lingenfelter is sworn in as Leader of the Official Opposition.

=== 2010 ===
- January 29, 2010 – NDP MLA Kim Trew announces that he will not be running in the next election.
- April 16, 2010 – Saskatchewan Party MLA Serge LeClerc resigns from the caucus to sit as an independent MLA. On April 20, he announces that he will not be running in the next election.
- May 13, 2010 – NDP MLA Ron Harper announces that he will retire at the end of his term.
- June 2, 2010 – Saskatchewan Party MLA Joceline Schriemer announces that she will not run for re-election.
- June 23, 2010 – Finance Minister Rod Gantefoer announces that he will retire at the next election.
- June 29, 2010 – Premier Brad Wall shuffles his Cabinet.
- August 31, 2010 – Independent MLA Serge LeClerc resigns his seat in the Legislature, leaving politics.
- October 18, 2010 – Gordon Wyant of the Saskatchewan Party wins the seat of Saskatoon Northwest in a byelection.

=== 2011 ===
- January 11, 2011 – NDP MLA Pat Atkinson announces that she will retire at the next provincial election.
- March 5, 2011 – Saskatchewan Party MLA Denis Allchurch loses his party's nomination for Rosthern-Shellbrook to Scott Moe.
- September 6, 2011 – Larissa Shasko abruptly resigns from the leadership of the Green Party of Saskatchewan; Shasko also gives up her candidacy for the Greens in Moose Jaw North. Federal Green Party of Canada leader Elizabeth May announces (via Twitter) that veteran provincial party activist Victor Lau will temporarily lead the Saskatchewan Greens.
- September 25, 2011 – Lau elected leader of the Green Party at an extraordinary convention in Regina.
- October 10, 2011 – Premier Brad Wall asks Lieutenant Governor Gordon Barnhart to dissolve the Legislative Assembly and issue writs of election.
- October 22, 2011 – Nominations close with 191 candidates running in 58 electoral districts.

== Incumbents not contesting their seats ==
=== Retiring incumbents ===
Saskatchewan Party

- Michael Chisholm, Cut Knife-Turtleford
- Rod Gantefoer, Melfort
- Joceline Schriemer, Saskatoon Sutherland

New Democrats

- Pat Atkinson, Saskatoon Nutana
- Ron Harper, Regina Northeast
- Kim Trew, Regina Coronation Park

=== Lost nomination election ===
Saskatchewan Party

- Denis Allchurch, Rosthern-Shellbrook

== Opinion polls ==
Polling Firm	Date of Polling	Link	Saskatchewan	New Democratic	Liberal	Green
Forum Research	November 5, 2011	HTML	62	34	1	3
Praxis	November 4, 2011	HTML	66.7	26.4	*	5.2
Forum Research	October 27, 2011	HTML	66	30	1	3
Insightrix	October 25–26, 2011	PDF	60.0	33.3	2.8	3.0
Praxis	August 29 – September 2, 2011	HTML	63.4	26.1	5.9	3.0
Insightrix	July 6–8, 2011	HTML	58.2	30.8	4.2	5.0
Sigma Analytics	November 6, 2010	HTML	57.3	29.4	8.2	4.8
Insightrix	April 15, 2010	PDF	58.3	28.7	*	*
Insightrix	November 2009	PDF	66.6	23.0	*	*
Environics	June 2009	HTML	62	35	2	*
Environics	April 2009	HTML	61	30	8	*
Environics	December 2008	HTML	65	27	8	*
Environics	October 2008	HTML	50	37	11	*
Environics	June 2008	HTML	46	41	10	*
Environics	March 2008	HTML	46	41	10	*
Environics	December 2007	HTML	50	33	15	*
Election 2007	November 7, 2007	HTML	50.9	37.2	9.4	2.0

== Riding-by-riding results ==
People in bold represent cabinet ministers and the speaker. Party leaders are italicized. The symbols ** indicates MLAs who did not run again.

All results are preliminary until approved by Elections Saskatchewan.

=== Northwest Saskatchewan ===
Electoral District	Candidates				Incumbent
Electoral District	SK Party	New Democratic	Green	Liberal	Incumbent
Athabasca	Bobby Woods; 1,017 (34.53%)	Buckley Belanger; 1,888 (64.11%)	George Durocher; 40 (1.36%)		Buckley Belanger
Cut Knife-Turtleford	Larry Doke; 3,977 (63.27%)	Bernadette Gopher; 2,096 (33.34%)	Vinessa Currie-Foster; 213 (3.39%)		Michael Chisholm**
Lloydminster	**Tim McMillan**; 2,797 (66.42%)	Wayne Byers; 1,225 (29.09%)	Meggan Hougham; 189 (4.49%)		**Tim McMillan**
Meadow Lake	**Jeremy Harrison**; 4,207 (61.97%)	Helen Ben; 2,491 (36.69%)	Susan Merasty; 91 (1.34%)		**Jeremy Harrison**
Rosthern-Shellbrook	Scott Moe; 4,442 (65.06%)	Clay DeBray; 2,174 (31.84%)	Margaret-Rose Uvery; 212 (3.10%)		Denis Allchurch**
The Battlefords	Herb Cox; 3,527 (51.06%)	Len Taylor; 2,475 (35.83%)	Owen Swiderski; 93 (1.35%)	Ryan Bater; 812 (11.76%)	Len Taylor

=== Northeast Saskatchewan ===
Electoral District	Candidates			Incumbent
Electoral District	SK Party	New Democratic	Green	Incumbent
Batoche	Delbert Kirsch; 4,650 (66.86%)	Janice Bernier; 2,106 (30.28%)	Amber Jones; 199 (2.86%)	Delbert Kirsch
Canora-Pelly	**Ken Krawetz**; 4,371 (71.15%)	Rob Carlson; 1,657 (26.98%)	Jaime Fairley; 115 (1.87%)	**Ken Krawetz**
Carrot River Valley	Fred Bradshaw; 4,903 (75.29%)	Arnold Schellenberg; 1,445 (22.19%)	Spence Bourassa; 164 (2.52%)	Fred Bradshaw
Cumberland	Joe Hordyski; 1,755 (33.42%)	Doyle Vermette; 3,319 (63.19%)	Samuel Hardlotte; 178 (3.39%)	Doyle Vermette
Kelvington-Wadena	**June Draude**; 5,091 (78.72%)	Graham Reid; 1,187 (18.36%)	Elaine Hughes; 189 (2.92%)	**June Draude**
Melfort	Kevin Phillips; 4,736 (73.10%)	Ivan Yackel; 1,599 (24.68%)	Melvin Pylypchuk; 144 (2.22%)	Rod Gantefoer**
Prince Albert Carlton	**Darryl Hickie**; 4,284 (60.17%)	Ted Zurakowski; 2,674 (37.56%)	George Morin; 162 (2.27%)	**Darryl Hickie**
Prince Albert Northcote	Victoria Jurgens; 2,816 (50.23%)	Darcy Furber; 2,625 (46.83%)	Raymond Bandet; 165 (2.94%)	Darcy Furber
Saskatchewan Rivers	Nadine Wilson; 4,749 (65.92%)	Jeanette Wicinski-Dunn; 2,247 (31.19%)	Paul-Emile L'Heureux; 208 (2.89%)	Nadine Wilson

=== West Central Saskatchewan ===
Electoral District	Candidates				Incumbent
Electoral District	SK Party	New Democratic	Green	Other	Incumbent
Arm River-Watrous	Greg Brkich; 5,061 (73.67%)	Eric Skonberg; 1,640 (23.87%)	Orest Shasko; 169 (2.46%)		Greg Brkich
Biggar	Randy Weekes; 4,493 (68.15%)	Glenn Wright; 1,695 (25.71%)	Darryl Amey; 206 (3.12%)	James Yachyshen (PC); 171 (2.59%) Dana Arnason (WIP); 28 (0.43%)	Randy Weekes
Humboldt	**Donna Harpauer**; 5,677 (73.02%)	Gord Bedient; 1,807 (23.24%)	Lynn Oliphant; 291 (3.74%)		**Donna Harpauer**
Kindersley	**Bill Boyd**; 4,502 (79.71%)	Peter Walker; 907 (16.06%)	Norbert Kratchmer; 239 (4.23%)		**Bill Boyd**
Martensville	Nancy Heppner; 6,819 (83.14%)	Catlin Hogan; 1,109 (13.52%)	Chad Wm. Crozier; 274 (3.34%)		Nancy Heppner
Rosetown-Elrose	**Jim Reiter**; 5,690 (81.20%)	Tom Howe; 1,121 (16.00%)	Dianne Rhodes; 196 (2.80%)		**Jim Reiter**

=== Southwest Saskatchewan ===
Electoral District	Candidates				Incumbent
Electoral District	SK Party	New Democratic	Green	Prog. Conservative	Incumbent
Cypress Hills	Wayne Elhard; 5,080 (82.90%)	Alex Mortensen; 757 (12.35%)	William Caton; 291 (4.75%)		Wayne Elhard
Moose Jaw North	Warren Michelson; 4,565 (59.17%)	Derek Hassen; 2,768 (35.88%)	Corinne Johnson; 99 (1.28%)	Rick Swenson; 283 (3.67%)	Warren Michelson
Moose Jaw Wakamow	Greg Lawrence; 3,064 (49.10%)	Deb Higgins; 2,863 (45.88%)	Deanna Robilliard; 104 (1.67%)	Tom Steen; 209 (3.35%)	Deb Higgins
Swift Current	**Brad Wall**; 6,021 (80.97%)	Aaron Ens; 1,223 (16.45%)	Amanda Huxted; 192 (2.58%)		**Brad Wall**
Thunder Creek	Lyle Stewart; 5,920 (79.61%)	Ryan McDonald; 1,304 (17.54%)	Jill Forrester; 212 (2.85%)		Lyle Stewart
Wood River	**Yogi Huyghebaert**; 5,354 (82.03%)	Randy Gaudry; 961 (14.72%)	Amelia Swiderski; 212 (3.25%)		**Yogi Huyghebaert**

=== Southeast Saskatchewan ===
Electoral District	Candidates				Incumbent
Electoral District	SK Party	New Democratic	Green	Other	Incumbent
Cannington	Dan D'Autremont; 4,691 (75.65%)	Todd Gervais; 919 (14.82%)	Daniel Johnson; 134 (2.16%)	Chris Brown (PC); 457 (7.37%)	Dan D'Autremont
Estevan	Doreen Eagles; 4,796 (79.24%)	Blair Schoenfeld; 1,045 (17.27%)	Sigfredo Gonzalez; 211 (3.49%)		Doreen Eagles
Indian Head-Milestone	**Don McMorris**; 5,766 (76.16%)	Richard J. Klyne; 1,516 (20.02%)	Shelby Hersberger; 289 (3.82%)		**Don McMorris**
Last Mountain-Touchwood	Glen Hart; 4,778 (67.49%)	Don Jeworski; 2,049 (28.95%)	Greg Chatterson; 222 (3.14%)	Frank J. Serfas (WIP); 30 (0.42%)	Glen Hart
Melville-Saltcoats	**Bob Bjornerud**; 5,071 (73.46%)	Leonard Dales; 1,689 (24.47%)	Jordan Fieseler; 143 (2.07%)		**Bob Bjornerud**
Moosomin	**Don Toth**; 4,810 (77.06%)	Carol Morin; 1,244 (19.93%)	Laura Forrester; 188 (3.01%)		**Don Toth**
Weyburn-Big Muddy	**Dustin Duncan**; 5,194 (75.71%)	Ken Kessler; 1,517 (22.12%)	Gene Ives; 149 (2.17%)		**Dustin Duncan**
Yorkton	Greg Ottenbreit; 5,446 (72.45%)	Chad Blenkin; 1,932 (25.70%)	Kathryn McDonald; 139 (1.85%)		Greg Ottenbreit

=== Saskatoon ===
Electoral District	Candidates				Incumbent
Electoral District	SK Party	New Democratic	Green	Liberal	Incumbent
Saskatoon Centre	David Cooper; 2,218 (42.92%)	David Forbes; 2,790 (54.00%)	Daeran Gall; 159 (3.08%)		David Forbes
Saskatoon Eastview	Corey Tochor; 5,217 (57.51%)	Judy Junor; 3,588 (39.56%)	Shawn Setyo; 266 (2.93%)		Judy Junor
Saskatoon Fairview	Jennifer Campeau; 2,644 (50.98%)	Andy Iwanchuk; 2,397 (46.22%)	Jan Norris; 145 (2.80%)		Andy Iwanchuk
Saskatoon Greystone	**Rob Norris**; 4,885 (58.39%)	Peter Prebble; 3,174 (37.94%)	Tammy McDonald; 140 (1.67%)	Simone Clayton; 167 (2.00%)	**Rob Norris**
Saskatoon Massey Place	Fawad (Ali) Muzaffar; 3,072 (43.40%)	Cam Broten; 3,812 (53.85%)	Diane West; 195 (2.75%)		Cam Broten
Saskatoon Meewasin	Roger Parent; 3,853 (54.05%)	Frank Quennell; 2,975 (41.73%)	Tobi-Dawne Smith; 160 (2.24%)	Nathan Jeffries; 141 (1.98%)	Frank Quennell
Saskatoon Northwest	Gordon Wyant; 4,761 (70.35%)	Nicole White; 1,718 (25.39%)	Luke Bonsan; 153 (2.26%)	Eric Steiner; 135 (2.00%)	Gordon Wyant
Saskatoon Nutana	Zoria Broughton; 3,290 (43.06%)	Cathy Sproule; 3,793 (49.64%)	Mark Bigland-Pritchard; 369 (4.83%)	Cole Hogan; 189 (2.47%)	Pat Atkinson**
Saskatoon Riversdale	Fred Ozirney; 2,349 (45.66%)	Danielle Chartier; 2,649 (51.50%)	Vicki Strelioff; 146 (2.84%)		Danielle Chartier
Saskatoon Silver Springs	**Ken Cheveldayoff**; 7,736 (74.59%)	Cindy Lee Sherban; 2,242 (21.62%)	D'Arcy Hande; 230 (2.22%)	Rod Stoesz; 163 (1.57%)	**Ken Cheveldayoff**
Saskatoon Southeast	**Don Morgan**; 8,073 (75.41%)	Zubair Sheikh; 2,068 (19.32%)	Sarah Risk; 297 (2.77%)	Brenda McKnight; 268 (2.50%)	**Don Morgan**
Saskatoon Sutherland	Paul Merriman; 3,994 (58.21%)	Naveed Anwar; 2,376 (34.63%)	Larry Waldinger; 305 (4.45%)	Kaleb Jeffries; 186 (2.71%)	Joceline Schriemer**

=== Regina ===
Electoral District	Candidates				Incumbent
Electoral District	SK Party	New Democratic	Green	Other	Incumbent
Regina Coronation Park	Mark Docherty; 3,354 (53.59%)	Jaime Garcia; 2,756 (44.04%)	Helmi Scott; 148 (2.37%)		Kim Trew**
Regina Dewdney	Gene Makowsky; 4,435 (60.65%)	Kevin Yates; 2,558 (34.98%)	Darcy Robilliard; 143 (1.96%)	Robin Schneider (Lib.); 176 (2.41%)	Kevin Yates
Regina Douglas Park	Russ Marchuk; 4,411 (52.00%)	Dwain Lingenfelter; 3,507 (41.34%)	Victor Lau; 565 (6.66%)		Dwain Lingenfelter
Regina Elphinstone-Centre	Bill Stevenson; 1,743 (38.54%)	Warren McCall; 2,581 (57.06%)	Ingrid Alesich; 199 (4.40%)		Warren McCall
Regina Lakeview	Bob Hawkins; 3,762 (46.56%)	John Nilson; 3,908 (48.37%)	Mike Wright; 410 (5.07%)		John Nilson
Regina Northeast	Kevin Doherty; 4,054 (58.90%)	Dwayne Yasinowski; 2,663 (38.69%)	Nathan Sgrazzutti; 165 (2.40%)		Ron Harper**
Regina Qu'Appelle Valley	**Laura Ross**; 6,269 (63.57%)	Steve Ryan; 3,359 (34.06%)	Billy Patterson; 190 (1.93%)	Hafeez Chaudhuri (Ind.); 44 (0.44%)	**Laura Ross**
Regina Rosemont	Tony Fiacco; 2,745 (42.21%)	Trent Wotherspoon; 3,567 (54.85%)	Allan Kirk; 191 (2.94%)		Trent Wotherspoon
Regina South	**Bill Hutchinson**; 4,461 (53.79%)	Yens Pedersen; 3,534 (42.61%)	David Orban; 299 (3.60%)		**Bill Hutchinson**
Regina Walsh Acres	Warren Steinley; 3,679 (58.18%)	Sandra Morin; 2,488 (39.34%)	Bart Soroka; 157 (2.48%)		Sandra Morin
Regina Wascana Plains	Christine Tell; 7,460 (69.30%)	Pat Maze; 2,895 (26.89%)	Bill Clary; 215 (2.00%)	Roy Gaebel (PC); 195 (1.81%)	Christine Tell

== Marginal seats ==
The following is a list of ridings which had narrowly been lost by the indicated party in the 2007 election. The symbol " * " indicates the incumbent MLA is not running again.

Saskatchewan Party	New Democratic
1. Saskatoon Eastview (NDP) 3.12% (won); 2. Saskatoon Meewasin (NDP) 3.47% (won); 3. The Battlefords (NDP) 4.1% (won); 4. Regina Dewdney (NDP) 5.87% (won)	1. Moose Jaw North (SK Party) 0.38% (held); 2. Meadow Lake (SK Party) 0.5% (held); 3. Prince Albert Carlton (SK Party) 0.78% (held); 4. Regina Qu'Appelle Valley (SK Party) 1.99% (held); 5. Regina South (SK Party) 2.6% (held); 6. Saskatoon Greystone (SK Party) 3.17% (held); 7. Saskatoon Sutherland (SK Party) 3.2% * (held)
Liberal
1. Saskatoon Meewasin (NDP) 5.21% (won by SK Party)

== Political parties ==
- Saskatchewan Party
- Saskatchewan NDP
- Green Party of Saskatchewan
- Saskatchewan Liberal Party
- Progressive Conservative Party of Saskatchewan
- Western Independence Party of Saskatchewan
