= 2007 Saskatchewan general election =

Canadian provincial election

- November 7, 2007

58 seats in the Legislative Assembly of Saskatchewan 30 seats needed for a majority
- Turnout: 76.0% (▲5.1pp)
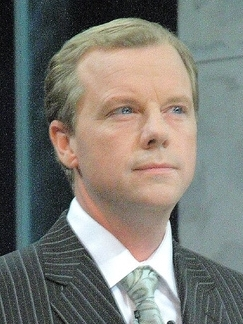

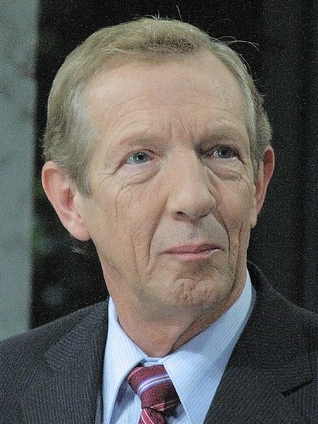
	First party	Second party	Third party
			LIB
Leader	Brad Wall	Lorne Calvert	David Karwacki
Party	Saskatchewan	New Democratic	Liberal
Leader since	March 15, 2004	January 27, 2001	October 27, 2001
Leader's seat	Swift Current	Saskatoon Riversdale	Ran in Saskatoon Meewasin (lost)
Last election	28 seats, 39.35%	30 seats, 44.68%	0 seats, 14.18%
Seats before	28	30	0
Seats won	38	20	0
Seat change	▲10	▼10	0
Popular vote	230,671	168,704	42,585
Percentage	50.92%	37.24%	9.40%
Swing	▲11.57pp	▼7.44pp	▼4.78pp
- Popular vote by riding. As this is an FPTP election, seat totals are not determined by popular vote, but instead via results by each riding.
Premier before election
Lorne Calvert
New Democratic
Premier after election
Brad Wall
Saskatchewan

The 2007 Saskatchewan general election was held on November 7, 2007 to determine the composition of the 26th Legislative Assembly of Saskatchewan.

The Saskatchewan New Democratic Party government of Premier Lorne Calvert was defeated by the Saskatchewan Party, led by Brad Wall. It was only the third time in the province's history that a centre-right party had won power.

As of 2024, the Saskatchewan Party has been the largest political party in Saskatchewan elections.

== Campaign ==
Lorne Calvert, Premier of Saskatchewan and leader of the New Democratic Party (NDP), advised the Lieutenant Governor of Saskatchewan to call an election for November 7, 2007. In the 2003 election, the NDP won 30 of 58 seats to form a majority government. The Saskatchewan Party, then led by Elwin Hermanson, won 28 seats in that election.

Following that election, Hermanson resigned as leader, and Swift Current MLA Brad Wall was acclaimed as his successor in March 2004.

Within a year after Wall took the leadership, the Saskatchewan Party unveiled a much more moderate policy platform in order to expand its support outside its rural base. This strategy paid off; by the spring of 2007 the Saskatchewan Party was well ahead in most opinion polling.

The NDP promised to create places for 10,000 new post-secondary students, and to lower tuition fees by $1,000. The Saskatchewan Party countered with a promise of a tuition rebate of up to $20,000 after graduation, spread over seven years.

At the leaders' debate, Liberal leader David Karwacki participated alongside Calvert and Wall despite the Liberals holding no seats going into the election. It is the last time to date that the leader of a party other than the NDP or the Saskatchewan Party has been invited to participate.

== Results ==
Summary of the Legislative Assembly of Saskatchewan election results
Party	Party leader	Candidates	Seats				Popular vote		
Party	Party leader	Candidates	2003	Dissol.	2007	Change	#	%	% Change
Saskatchewan	Brad Wall	57	28	28	38	+10	230,671	50.92%	+11.57%
New Democratic	Lorne Calvert	58	30	30	20	-10	168,704	37.24%	-7.44%
Liberal	David Karwacki	58	0	0	0	–	42,585	9.40%	-4.78%
Green	Sandra Finley	48	0	0	0	–	9,128	2.01%	+1.46%
Progressive Conservative	Rick Swenson	5	0	0	0	–	832	0.18%	+0.02%
Western Independence	John Nesdoly	8	0	0	0	–	572	0.13%	-0.48%
Marijuana	Nathan Holowaty	5	0	0	0	–	517	0.11%	+0.11%
Total		239	58	58	58	–	453,009	100%	

Five New Democratic incumbents – Graham Addley, Mark Wartman, Maynard Sonntag, Lon Borgerson and Glenn Hagel – were defeated. Sonntag was initially declared elected in Meadow Lake on election night, but was declared defeated the following day after a reported tabulation error. This result was confirmed following the counting of absentee ballots on November 19.

The other five seat gains for the Saskatchewan Party came in districts where the New Democratic incumbent did not stand for reelection.

This is the most recent election to date in which any party other than the NDP or the Saskatchewan Party received more than 5% of the vote.

=== Percentages ===
Popular vote
Saskatchewan	50.92%
New Democratic	37.24%
Liberal	9.40%
Green	2.01%
Others	0.43%

Seats summary
Saskatchewan	65.52%
New Democratic	34.48%

=== Ranking ===
Party	Seats	Second	Third	Fourth
Saskatchewan Party	38	19	0	0
New Democratic Party	20	38	0	0
Liberal Party	0	1	56	1
Green	0	0	2	43
Progressive Conservative	0	0	0	3
Western Independence	0	0	0	1
Marijuana	0	0	0	1

=== Results by region ===
Party Name		Northern	Prince Albert	Central	Southern	Moose Jaw	Saskatoon	Regina	Total
Saskatchewan Party	Seats:	10	1	6	12	1	5	3	38
Saskatchewan Party	Popular Vote:	55.58%	41.60%	64.38%	66.70%	41.61%	42.73%	35.64%	50.92%
NDP	Seats:	3	1	0	0	1	7	8	20
NDP	Popular Vote:	37.79%	49.56%	24.52%	24.42%	48.63%	41.63%	47.53%	37.24%
Liberal	Seats:	0	0	0	0	0	0	0	0
Liberal	Popular Vote:	5.03%	7.05%	8.14%	6.79%	6.62%	12.77%	14.03%	9.40%
Green	Seats:	0	0	0	0	0	0	0	0
Green	Popular Vote:	1.20%	1.79%	2.44%	1.53%	1.83%	2.33%	2.67%	2.01%
Progressive Conservative	Seats:	0	0	0	0	0	0	0	0
Progressive Conservative	Popular Vote:	xx	xx	0.35%	0.31%	1.31%	0.15%	xx	0.18%
Western Independence	Seats:	0	0	0	0	0	0	0	0
Western Independence	Popular Vote:	0.30%	xx	0.18%	0.24%	xx	xx	xx	0.13%
Marijuana	Seats:	0	0	0	0	0	0	0	0
Marijuana	Popular Vote:	xx	xx	xx	xx	xx	0.37%	0.13%	0.11%
Total seats:		13	2	6	12	2	12	11	58

=== 10 closest ridings ===
1. Moose Jaw North: Warren Michelson (SK Party) def. Glenn Hagel (NDP) by 33 votes
2. Meadow Lake: Jeremy Harrison (SK Party) def. Maynard Sonntag (NDP) by 36 votes
3. Prince Albert Carlton: Darryl Hickie (SK Party) def. Chad Nilson (NDP) by 61 votes
4. Regina Qu'Appelle Valley: Laura Ross (SK Party) def. Mark Wartman (NDP) by 204 votes
5. Regina South: Bill Hutchinson (SK Party) def. Yens Pedersen (NDP) by 255 votes
6. Saskatoon Sutherland: Joceline Schriemer (SK Party) def. Graham Addley (NDP) by 269 votes
7. Saskatoon Meewasin: Frank Quennell (NDP) def. Roger Parent (SK Party) by 299 votes
8. Saskatoon Greystone: Rob Norris (SK Party) def. Andrew Mason (NDP) by 308 votes
9. Saskatoon Eastview: Judy Junor (NDP) def. Terry Alm (SK Party) by 310 votes
10. The Battlefords: Len Taylor (NDP) def. Herb Cox (SK Party) by 312 votes

== Riding-by-riding results ==
People in bold represent cabinet ministers and the Speaker. Party leaders are italicized. The symbol " ** " represents MLAs who did not run again.

=== Northwest Saskatchewan ===
Electoral District	Candidates					Incumbent
Electoral District	Saskatchewan Party	New Democratic	Liberal	Green	Western Independence	Incumbent
Athabasca	Phil Elliott; 1,012 (31.89%)	**Buckley Belanger**; 1,885 (59.41%)	Malvina Iron; 174 (5.48%)	Edna Daigneault; 102 (3.22%)		**Buckley Belanger**
Cut Knife-Turtleford	Michael Chisholm; 4,060 (61.03%)	Roger Emberley; 2,092 (31.45%)	Margaret MacGowan; 294 (4.42%)	Vinessa Currie; 140 (2.11%)	John Nesdoly; 66 (0.99%)	Michael Chisholm
Lloydminster	Tim McMillan; 3,219 (61.29%)	Grant Whitstone; 1,931 (36.77%)	John MacGowan; 102 (1.94%)			Milt Wakefield**
Meadow Lake	Jeremy Harrison; 3,507 (48.86%)	**Maynard Sonntag**; 3,471 (48.36%)	Don Coupland; 200 (2.78%)			**Maynard Sonntag**
Rosthern-Shellbrook	Denis Allchurch; 4,134 (57.50%)	Ron Blocka; 2,553 (35.51%)	Linda Neher; 339 (4.72%)	Margaret-Rose Uvery; 163 (2.27%)		Denis Allchurch
The Battlefords	Herb Cox; 3,020 (39.71%)	**Len Taylor**; 3,332 (43.81%)	Ryan Bater; 1,016 (13.36%)	Reid Stewart; 180 (2.37%)	Gordon Elias; 57 (0.75%)	**Len Taylor**

=== Northeast Saskatchewan ===
Electoral District	Candidates					Incumbent
Electoral District	Saskatchewan Party	New Democratic	Liberal	Green	Western Independence	Incumbent
Batoche	Delbert Kirsch; 4,523 (59.77%)	Don Hovdebo; 2,583 (34.14%)	Bernie Yuzdepski; 461 (6.09%)			Delbert Kirsch
Canora-Pelly	Ken Krawetz; 4,632 (64.49%)	Kerry Bewcyk; 2,148 (29.90%)	Duncan May; 232 (3.23%)	Keith Neu; 115 (1.60%)	Carl Barabonoff; 56 (0.78%)	Ken Krawetz
Carrot River Valley	Fred Bradshaw; 4,634 (61.79%)	Leigh Spencer; 2,491 (33.21%)	Gerry MacNeill; 375 (5.00%)			Allan Kerpan**
Cumberland	Winston McKay; 1,088 (22.97%)	**Joan Beatty**; 3,124 (65.96%)	Heath Muggli; 230 (4.86%)	Harold Johnson; 294 (6.21%)		**Joan Beatty**
Kelvington-Wadena	June Draude; 5,330 (70.17%)	Mervin Kryzanowski; 1,753 (23.08%)	Don Gabel; 294 (3.87%)	Elaine Hughes; 138 (1.82%)	John Koban; 81 (1.06%)	June Draude
Melfort	Rod Gantefoer; 4,751 (65.25%)	Dale Renneberg; 2,191 (30.09%)	Sarah Koskie; 339 (4.66%)			Rod Gantefoer
Prince Albert Carlton	Darryl Hickie; 3,675 (47.33%)	Chad Nilson; 3,614 (46.55%)	Jill Swenson; 370 (4.77%)	Steve Lawrence; 105 (1.35%)		**Myron Kowalsky****
Prince Albert Northcote	Kevin Shiach; 2,130 (34.41%)	Darcy Furber; 3,301 (53.33%)	Colin Fraser; 614 (9.92%)	Ray Johnson; 145 (2.34%)		**Eldon Lautermilch****
Saskatchewan Rivers	Nadine Wilson; 4,294 (54.92%)	**Lon Borgerson**; 3,221 (41.19%)	Alyssa Fullerton; 304 (3.89%)			**Lon Borgerson**

=== West Central Saskatchewan ===
Electoral District	Candidates					Incumbent
Electoral District	Saskatchewan Party	New Democratic	Liberal	Green	Other	Incumbent
Arm River-Watrous	Greg Brkich; 4,683 (57.92%)	Gordon MacMurchy; 2,314 (28.62%)	Lou Coderre; 762 (9.43%)	Arnold Taylor; 162 (2.00%)	Gordon Pederson (PC); 164 (2.03%)	Greg Brkich
Biggar	Randy Weekes; 4,499 (50.93%)	Ken Crush; 2,311 (30.78%)	Nathan Jeffries; 493 (6.57%)	Darryl Amey; 204 (2.72%)		Randy Weekes
Humboldt	Donna Harpauer; 5,049 (57.57%)	Brenda Curtis; 2,456 (28.01%)	Brent Loehr; 1,048 (11.95%)	Anita Rocamora; 217 (2.47%)		Donna Harpauer
Kindersley	Bill Boyd; 4,513 (66.95%)	Sarah Connor; 1,376 (20.41%)	Erhard Poggemiller; 577 (8.56%)	Norbert Kratchmer; 192 (2.85%)	Bruce Ritter (WIP); 83 (1.23%)	Jason Dearborn**
Martensville	Nancy Heppner; 5,981 (73.47%)	Chris Gallaway; 1,525 (18.73%)	Eric Steiner; 476 (5.85%)	Hart Haidn; 159 (1.95%)		Nancy Heppner
Rosetown-Elrose	Jim Reiter; 5,669 (71.18%)	Eric Anderson; 1,592 (19.99%)	Tracey Kowalchuk; 485 (6.09%)	Kirk Friggstad; 218 (2.74%)		Elwin Hermanson**

=== Southwest Saskatchewan ===
Electoral District	Candidates					Incumbent
Electoral District	Saskatchewan Party	New Democratic	Liberal	Green	Other	Incumbent
Cypress Hills	Wayne Elhard; 5,357 (75.72%)	Jason Hicks; 1,129 (15.96%)	Josh Haugerud; 321 (4.54%)	Bill Clary; 209 (2.95%)	David Sawkiw (WIP); 59 (0.83%)	Wayne Elhard
Moose Jaw North	Warren Michelson; 3,960 (45.83%)	Glenn Hagel; 3,927 (45.45%)	John Morris; 627 (7.26%)	Deanna Robilliard; 126 (1.46%)		Glenn Hagel
Moose Jaw Wakamow	Gwen Beitel; 2,726 (36.70%)	**Deb Higgins**; 3,887 (52.33%)	Sharice Billett Niedermayer; 436 (5.87%)	Larissa Shasko; 168 (2.26%)	Tom Steen (PC); 211 (2.84%)	**Deb Higgins**
Swift Current	**Brad Wall**; 6,006 (70.88%)	Robert Hale; 1,983 (23.40%)	Justin Orthner; 300 (3.54%)	Gail Schroh; 185 (2.18%)		**Brad Wall**
Thunder Creek	Lyle Stewart; 5,558 (64.45%)	Larry Hall; 1,997 (23.16%)	Rod Haugerud; 590 (6.84%)	Russ Rudd; 184 (2.13%)	Rick Swenson (PC); 295 (3.42%)	Lyle Stewart
Wood River	Yogi Huyghebaert; 5,323 (69.59%)	Steve Ryan; 1,320 (17.26%)	Michael Klein; 768 (10.04%)	Lynn Arrayet; 171 (2.23%)	Rockey Young (WIP); 67 (0.88%)	Yogi Huyghebaert

=== Southeast Saskatchewan ===
Electoral District	Candidates					Incumbent
Electoral District	Saskatchewan Party	New Democratic	Liberal	Green	Western Independence	Incumbent
Cannington	Dan D'Autremont; 5,614 (77.75%)	Henry Friesen; 1,198 (16.59%)	Karen Spelay; 409 (5.66%)			Dan D'Autremont
Estevan	Doreen Eagles; 4,703 (66.16%)	Morris Johnson; 1,335 (18.79%)	Tim Seipp; 910 (12.81%)	Sigfredo Gonzales; 158 (2.22%)		Doreen Eagles
Indian Head-Milestone	Don McMorris; 5,351 (63.97%)	Corinne Pauliuk; 2,301 (27.51%)	Michael Hiebert; 510 (6.09%)	Dagan Harding; 203 (2.43%)		Don McMorris
Last Mountain-Touchwood	Glen Hart; 4,736 (60.39%)	Jordon Hillier; 2,419 (30.85%)	Deon Kalaman; 507 (6.47%)	Wybo Ottenbreit-Born; 180 (2.29%)		Glen Hart
Melville-Saltcoats	Bob Bjornerud; 5,039 (62.28%)	Marlys Knezacek; 2,574 (31.81%)	Henry Farmer; 375 (4.64%)		Frank Serfas; 103 (1.27%)	Bob Bjornerud
Moosomin	Don Toth; 5,101 (72.32%)	Virginia Healey; 1,506 (21.35%)	Randy Jeffries; 446 (6.33%)			Don Toth
Weyburn-Big Muddy	Dustin Duncan; 4,972 (60.71%)	Sharon Elliott; 2,060 (25.15%)	Colleen Christopherson-Cote; 1,004 (12.26%)	Al Birchard; 154 (1.88%)		Dustin Duncan
Yorkton	Greg Ottenbreit; 5,005 (59.46%)	Randy Goulden; 3,158 (37.52%)	Joyce Landry; 254 (3.02%)			**Clay Serby****

=== Saskatoon ===
Electoral District	Candidates						Incumbent
Electoral District	Saskatchewan Party	New Democratic	Liberal	Green	Marijuana	Progressive Conservative	Incumbent
Saskatoon Centre	Jonathan Abrametz; 1,929 (29.85%)	**David Forbes**; 3,707 (57.36%)	Derek Morrison; 565 (8.74%)	Nathan Risling; 150 (2.32%)	Nathan Holowaty; 112 (1.73%)		**David Forbes**
Saskatoon Eastview	Terry Alm; 4,198 (42.24%)	**Judy Junor**; 4,508 (45.36%)	Paul Maczek; 980 (9.86%)	Keane Gruending; 252 (2.54%)			**Judy Junor**
Saskatoon Fairview	Eileen Gelowitz; 2,182 (34.20%)	**Andy Iwanchuk**; 3,272 (51.28%)	Jim Pulfer; 695 (10.89%)	Shannon Lee Dyck; 138 (2.16%)		James M. Yachyshen; 94 (1.47%)	**Andy Iwanchuk**
Saskatoon Greystone	Rob Norris; 4,080 (41.97%)	Andrew Mason; 3,772 (38.80%)	Zeba Ahmad; 1,639 (16.86%)	Robert Cram; 231 (2.38%)			Peter Prebble**
Saskatoon Massey Place	Dennis Neudorf; 2,629 (35.63%)	Cam Broten; 4,109 (55.69%)	Ashraf Omar; 473 (6.41%)	Crystal Stadnyk; 168 (2.28%)			**Eric Cline****
Saskatoon Meewasin	Roger Parent; 2,740 (31.85%)	**Frank Quennell**; 3,039 (35.32%)	David Karwacki; 2,591 (30.11%)	Don Cameron; 149 (1.73%)	Matt Oscienny; 85 (0.99%)		**Frank Quennell**
Saskatoon Northwest	Serge LeClerc; 4,513 (53.80%)	Ken Winton-Grey; 2,490 (29.68%)	Ryan Androsoff; 1,238 (14.76%)	Rick Barsky; 148 (1.76%)			Ted Merriman**
Saskatoon Nutana	Don Johannesson; 2,552 (29.13%)	**Pat Atkinson**; 4,529 (51.70%)	Grant Karwacki; 1,147 (13.09%)	Sandra Finley; 355 (4.05%)	Christine King; 109 (1.24%)	Gwen Katzman; 68 (0.78%)	**Pat Atkinson**
Saskatoon Riversdale	Fred Ozirney; 2,058 (32.45%)	**Lorne Calvert**; 3,560 (56.13%)	Roman Todos; 511 (8.06%)	Jan Norris; 123 (1.94%)	Michael Kereiff; 90 (1.42%)		**Lorne Calvert**
Saskatoon Silver Springs	Ken Cheveldayoff; 6,884 (61.80%)	Gord Bedient; 3,060 (27.47%)	Karen Parhar; 959 (8.61%)	Cameron McRae; 236 (2.12%)			Ken Cheveldayoff
Saskatoon Southeast	Don Morgan; 6,125 (58.94%)	Jane Wollenberg; 2,954 (28.43%)	Mark Lemstra; 1,155 (11.11%)	Mike Fornssler; 158 (1.52%)			Don Morgan
Saskatoon Sutherland	Joceline Schriemer; 3,679 (43.84%)	**Graham Addley**; 3,410 (40.64%)	Dave Parker; 1,034 (12.32%)	Lynn Oliphant; 268 (3.19%)			**Graham Addley**

=== Regina ===
Electoral District	Candidates					Incumbent
Electoral District	Saskatchewan Party	New Democratic	Liberal	Green	Marijuana	Incumbent
Regina Coronation Park	Terill Young; 2,341 (31.76%)	**Kim Trew**; 4,122 (55.93%)	Marlin Belt; 669 (9.08%)	Allan Kirk; 117 (1.59%)	Tom Shapiro; 121 (1.64%)	**Kim Trew**
Regina Dewdney	Don Saelhof; 3,328 (39.62%)	**Kevin Yates**; 3,821 (45.49%)	Shaine Peters; 1,083 (12.89%)	Darcy Robillard; 167 (1.99%)		**Kevin Yates**
Regina Douglas Park	Scott Simpkins; 3,051 (30.89%)	**Harry Van Mulligen**; 5,128 (51.92%)	Nick Schenher; 1,321 (13.37%)	Victor Lau; 377 (3.82%)		**Harry Van Mulligen**
Regina Elphinstone-Centre	Debbi Stevenson; 1,182 (22.90%)	**Warren McCall**; 3,224 (62.47%)	Keitha Kennedy; 478 (9.26%)	Ingrid Alesich; 277 (5.37%)		**Warren McCall**
Regina Lakeview	Raynelle Wilson; 2,932 (32.33%)	**John Nilson**; 4,323 (47.67%)	Matt Sirois; 1,418 (15.64%)	Robert Cosbey; 395 (4.36%)		**John Nilson**
Regina Northeast	Morris Elfenbaum; 3,308 (40.44%)	**Ron Harper**; 3,995 (48.83%)	Bryan Bell; 717 (8.76%)	Hal Swartz; 161 (1.97%)		**Ron Harper**
Regina Qu'Appelle Valley	Laura Ross; 4,362 (42.59%)	**Mark Wartman**; 4,158 (40.60%)	Michael Huber; 1,597 (15.59%)	Nicolas Stulberg; 125 (1.22%)		**Mark Wartman**
Regina Rosemont	Tony Fiacco; 2,624 (34.83%)	Trent Wotherspoon; 4,026 (53.44%)	Jeff Raymond; 667 (8.85%)	Vicki Nelson; 216 (2.87%)		Joanne Crofford**
Regina South	Bill Hutchinson; 4,302 (43.81%)	Yens Pedersen; 4,047 (41.21%)	Mark Lloyd; 1,215 (12.37%)	Ron McMahon; 256 (2.61%)		Andrew Thomson**
Regina Walsh Acres	~~Dan Harder~~^{1}	**Sandra Morin**; 3,942 (61.99%)	Marie-France Magnin; 2,198 (34.57%)	Kelsey Pearson; 219 (3.44%)		**Sandra Morin**
Regina Wascana Plains	Christine Tell; 5,818 (52.74%)	Tyler Forrest; 3,450 (31.28%)	Joe Stroeder; 1,593 (14.44%)	Jim Elliott; 170 (1.54%)		Doreen Hamilton**

==== Notes ====
^{1} Dan Harder, the Saskatchewan Party candidate in Regina Walsh Acres, withdrew his candidacy on October 27, 2007 after the party learned the details of a complaint of inappropriate conduct made against him by employees of Big Brothers of Regina in 2006 while he was executive director of the organization.
