= Lynn Oliphant =

Canadian veterinary scientist and politician

Lynn Oliphant is a professor emeritus from the Department of Veterinary Biomedical Sciences at the University of Saskatchewan and a founding member of the Prairie Institute for Human Ecology. Oliphant was a frequent candidate for the Green Party of Saskatchewan and a one-time candidate for the Green Party of Canada, but was never elected.

== Life and career ==
Oliphant received a Ph.D. in Zoology from the University of Washington and moved to Saskatchewan in 1971. There he became actively involved with the Saskatchewan Environmental Society.

Oliphant began running as a political candidate in Saskatchewan for the New Green Alliance in 1999, a party that would later be renamed the Green Party of Saskatchewan. In a province that has never elected a Green candidate to the Legislative Assembly, Oliphant never received more than 291 votes in four provincial elections between 1999 and 2011. Oliphant also ran as a federal Green Party candidate in the 2004 federal election.

Oliphant has been recognized for promoting sustainability. In the late 1990s, Oliphant constructed a straw-bale house near Aberdeen, what he called a "physical demonstration of an alternative home" that could function in the Prairie climate. In 2005, he received a Canadian Environment Award for his work on the Craik Sustainable Living Project, which was a project proposed by the Prairie Institute for Human Ecology. In 2016, Oliphant founded a private graveyard on his own property that could offer sustainable burials at twelve gravesites, which he called Prairie Sky Cemetery. In 2023, at the age of 80, Oliphant was one of seven Saskatchewan residents who took the provincial government to court over its failure to achieve greenhouse gas emissions, arguing that the continued expansion of fossil fuel-fired electricity generation ultimately violates Section 7 of the Canadian Charter of Rights and Freedoms.

== Electoral results ==
=== Provincial ===
2011 Saskatchewan general election: Humboldt
Party	Candidate	Votes	%	±%
Saskatchewan	Donna Harpauer	5,677	73.02%	+15.45%
NDP	Gord Bedient	1,807	23.24%	-4.77%
Green	Lynn Oliphant	291	3.74%	+1.27%
Total		7,775	100.00%	

2007 Saskatchewan general election: Saskatoon Sutherland
Party	Candidate	Votes	%	±%
Saskatchewan	Joceline Schriemer	3,679	43.85	+17.53
NDP	Graham Addley	3,410	40.64	-5.95
Liberal	Dave Parker	1,034	12.32	-13.30
Green	Lynn Oliphant	268	3.19	+1.72
Total		8,391	100.00	

2003 Saskatchewan general election: Saskatoon Sutherland
Party	Candidate	Votes	%	±%
NDP	Graham Addley	3,616	46.59	+2.17
Saskatchewan	Patrick Bundrock	2,043	26.32	-11.84
Liberal	Mark Kelleher	1,988	25.62	+8.20
New Green	Lynn Oliphant	114	1.47	*
Total		7,761	100.00	

1999 Saskatchewan general election: Saskatoon Fairview
Party	Candidate	Votes	%	±%
NDP	Chris Axworthy	2,653	56.68	-7.55
Saskatchewan	Sandra Rees	1,137	24.29	+3.11
Liberal	Barry Anderson	649	13.86	+1.67
Prog. Conservative	Gwen Katzman	153	3.27	-
New Green	Lynn Oliphant	89	1.90	-0.50
Total		4,681	100.00	

=== Federal ===
2004 Canadian federal election: Blackstrap
Party	Candidate	Votes	%	±%	Expenditures
Conservative	Lynne Yelich	15,608	41.5	+2.6	$71,019
Liberal	Tiffany Paulsen	11,815	31.4	+8.8	$50,307
New Democratic	Don Kossick	8,862	23.6	-2.8	$51,849
Green	Lynn Oliphant	1,168	3.1	+1.7	$25
Christian Heritage	Clayton Sundberg	177	0.5	–	–
Total valid votes		37,630	100.0		–
Total rejected ballots		98	0.3	0.0	
Turnout		37,728	64	-2	
