= Schriemer =

Surname list

Schriemer is a surname. Notable people with the surname include:

- Adam Schriemer (born 1995), Canadian volleyball player
- Joceline Schriemer, Canadian provincial politician
