= Laura Ross (politician) =

Canadian politician

The Honourable Laura Ross ECS

Member of the Saskatchewan Legislative Assembly for Regina Rochdale Regina Qu'Appelle Valley (2007-2016)
- In office November 7, 2007 – October 1, 2024
- Preceded by: Mark Wartman
- Succeeded by: Joan Pratchler

Personal details
- Born: Yorkton, Saskatchewan
- Party: Saskatchewan Party

Laura Ross is a Canadian politician. She was a member of the Legislative Assembly of Saskatchewan from 2007 to 2024. Ross represented the districts of Regina Qu'Appelle Valley and Regina Rochdale a member of the Saskatchewan Party.

== Biography ==
Laura Ross was born in Yorkton, Saskatchewan. Raised on her family's farm, Ross attained a Bachelor of Arts degree majoring in geography and sociology from the University of Regina before entering the workforce. Ross, along with her husband Terry, were farmers before entering the catering business as a self-employed person. After exiting the world of catering, Ross moved into residential real estate, working in this field for over twenty years.

Prior to her entrance into politics, Ross worked in the community, serving at various times in roles such as Chair of the Board of Directors of the Regina Pioneer Village, a large care facility for senior citizens in Regina. Ross has also been involved in women's rights organisations, serving in executive positions on the Regina Council of Women, the Saskatchewan Council of Women, and later the Canadian Federation of University Women. Today, Ross involves herself in the community at various times by organising fundraisers for organisations such as the Salvation Army.

In the 2007 Saskatchewan provincial election, Ross won the electoral district of Regina Qu'Appelle Valley for the Saskatchewan Party with a slim plurality - she won 4324 votes (42.55%), with second place incumbent Mark Wartman winning 4125 votes (40.6%). Ross had previously attempted to win the constituency of Regina Douglas Park in the 2003 election, but placed second after then Member for Regina Victoria Harry Van Mulligen.

Ross was appointed to the Executive Council of Saskatchewan on June 19, 2010 as Minister of Government Services in the government of Brad Wall. She was shuffled out of cabinet on May 25, 2012. Ross re-entered cabinet on November 9, 2020 as Minister of Parks, Culture and Sport.

Ross lost her seat in the 2024 Saskatchewan general election to NDP candidate Joan Pratchler.

== Cabinet positions ==
Saskatchewan provincial government of Scott Moe
Cabinet post (1)
Predecessor	Office	Successor
Gene Makowsky	Minister of Parks, Culture and Sport; November 9, 2020–November 7, 2024	Alana Ross
Saskatchewan provincial government of Brad Wall
Cabinet post (1)
Predecessor	Office	Successor
Christine Tell	Minister of Government Services; June 29, 2010–May 25, 2012	Nancy Heppner
