= Bob Mitchell (Saskatchewan politician) =

Canadian politician

Robert Wayne Mitchell

Member of the Legislative Assembly of Saskatchewan for Saskatoon Fairview
- In office 1986–1999
- Preceded by: Ray Weiman
- Succeeded by: Chris Axworthy

Personal details
- Born: March 29, 1936 Preeceville, Saskatchewan, Canada
- Died: November 18, 2016 (aged 80) Regina, Saskatchewan, Canada
- Party: Saskatchewan New Democratic Party
- Spouse: Sharon Gates (1958-1966) Sandra Stolson (1968-2016; his death)
- Children: 6 daughters
- Profession: lawyer

Robert Wayne Mitchell SOM QC (March 29, 1936 – November 18, 2016) was a lawyer and former political figure in Saskatchewan, Canada. He represented Saskatoon Fairview from 1986 to 1999 in the Legislative Assembly of Saskatchewan as a New Democratic Party (NDP) member.

== Biography ==
He was born in Preeceville, Saskatchewan in 1936, the son of Charles Stuart Mitchell and Beda Annette Abrahamson, and was educated in Sturgis and at the University of Saskatchewan, where he received a BA in Economics and a LLB. Mitchell articled in Regina and was called to the Saskatchewan bar in 1960. He practised law in Swift Current and Regina. Mitchell's first marriage was to Sharon Diane Gates and the couple had three daughters: Janet, Roberta and Shannon. In 1968, Mitchell married Sandra Gail Stolson and the couple had three daughters; Stephanie, Donna, and Alison. From 1970 to 1974, he served as Director of Legal Services for the federal Department of Regional Economic Expansion and the federal Department of Labour in Ottawa. Mitchell was Deputy Minister of Labour in Saskatchewan from 1974 to 1979. He then practised law in Saskatoon. From 1981 to 1982, he was chief negotiator for the Canadian government for Inuit land claims in the central and eastern Arctic.

Mitchell ran unsuccessfully for a seat in the provincial assembly in 1982 before being elected in 1986. He served in the provincial cabinet as Minister of Human Resources, Labour and Employment, as Provincial Secretary, as Minister of Justice and Attorney General, as Minister of Labour and as Minister of Post-Secondary Education and Skills Training. Mitchell resigned from the Saskatchewan cabinet in 1998 and from the assembly in 1999.

After leaving provincial politics, he became chief negotiator for the Federation of Saskatchewan Indian Nations. In 2004, he was named Chair of the Saskatchewan Public Complaints Commission, which is responsible for investigating complaints against municipal police. He retired from the Commission on October 1, 2014, and was replaced as Chair by Brent Cotter. In 2017, he was posthumously made a member of the Saskatchewan Order of Merit.

Mitchell died in 2016, at the age of 80.
