= Saskatchewan Marijuana Party =

- Former provincial party
- Abbreviation: SKMP
- Leader: Nathan Holowaty
- Founded: 2006
- Dissolved: 2011
- Headquarters: Saskatoon, Saskatchewan
- Ideology: Anti-Prohibitionism (cannabis)
- Colours: Gold

Website
- www.saskmp.ca

The Saskatchewan Marijuana Party was a provincial political party based in Saskatchewan, Canada. The party contested the 2007 Saskatchewan general election and failed to win any seats, securing less than one percent of the vote.

== History ==
The seeds of the Saskatchewan Marijuana Party were planted by Marc Emery, a founding member of the Canadian federal Marijuana Party and former leader of the British Columbia Marijuana Party. In March 2004, Emery was arrested in Saskatoon for trafficking after passing a joint to another person while attending a pro-cannabis rally at the University of Saskatchewan (U of S). Emery was sentenced to three months in jail. While he served his sentence, two protestors staged a vigil outside the Provincial Courthouse in response. Emery was released after serving two months of his sentence, and immediately vowed to establish a Marijuana Party in the province and to run a full slate of candidates in the next election, which was slated for 2007.

In June 2006, the Saskatchewan Marijuana Party (SKMP) was officially registered with Elections Saskatchewan. Nathan Holowaty, a former president of the U of S New Democratic Party campus club, was named party leader, and Ethan Erkiletian was named party president. The same month, the party held a fundraiser barbecue for the Saskatoon Food Bank, with Holowaty stating that the party was "a community-minded organization"; while the party's platform consisted principally of cannabis legalization, Holowaty emphasized that the party was focused on social issues and advocating for "a healthy society".

Holowaty became the first SKMP candidate in contesting a March 2007 by-election in the district of Martensville. Holowaty received 38 votes and finished sixth out of seven candidates. In the fall 2007 provincial election, the party fielded five candidates—all in Saskatoon and Regina and far short of the full slate it had envisioned. The party received 517 votes; its best finish was in Regina Coronation Park, where candidate Tom Shapiro's 121 votes resulted in a fourth-place finish.

The party de-registered in 2011 and did not run in the 2011 Saskatchewan general election.

When the Canadian government announced in 2017 that it would be legalizing marijuana across the country, former SKMP member Ken Sailor publicly applauded the decision, stating that it was "about time that marijuana was legalized".

== Electoral results ==
Election	Leader	Seats	Change	Place	Votes	%	Position
2007	Nathan Holowaty	0 / 58	0	▲7	517	0.1%	No seats

== See also ==
- Politics of Saskatchewan
- List of Saskatchewan political parties
