= Hugh Gordon (Canadian politician) =

Canadian politician

Member of the Saskatchewan Legislative Assembly for Saskatoon Silverspring
- Incumbent
- Assumed office October 28, 2024
- Preceded by: Paul Merriman

Shadow Minister of Highways, Infrastructure, and Saskatchewan Government Insurance
- Incumbent
- Assumed office November 13, 2024
- Preceded by: Nathaniel Teed

Shadow Minister for SaskBuilds and Procurement.
- Incumbent
- Assumed office June 3, 2025
- Preceded by: position established

Opposition Caucus Military Liaison
- Incumbent
- Assumed office June 3, 2025
- Preceded by: position established

Personal details
- Party: Saskatchewan NDP
- Occupation: Police Officer
- Website: https://www.ndpcaucus.sk.ca/hughgordon

Hugh Gordon is a Canadian politician who was elected to the Legislative Assembly of Saskatchewan in the 2024 general election, representing Saskatoon Silverspring as a member of the New Democratic Party.

== Career ==
Before entering politics, Gordon worked for the Royal Canadian Mounted Police for 24 years, where he was a financial crime investigator. He moved to Saskatoon in 2009.

== Electoral record ==
2024 Saskatchewan general election: Saskatoon Silverspring
Party	Candidate	Votes	%	±%
New Democratic	Hugh Gordon	4,435	51.43	+15.93
Saskatchewan	Paul Merriman	3,999	46.37	-15.13
Green	Jackie Hanson	190	2.20	-0.80
Total valid votes		8,624	99.01	
Total rejected ballots		86	0.99	
Turnout		8,710	62.28	
Eligible voters		13,985		
Source: Elections Saskatchewan
New Democratic gain		Swing		
