= Regina Qu'Appelle Valley =

Former provincial electoral district in Saskatchewan, Canada

Coordinates: 50°33′N 104°45′W

Saskatchewan electoral district
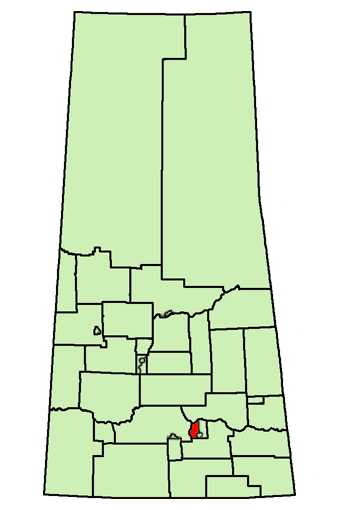

Defunct provincial electoral district
- Legislature: Legislative Assembly of Saskatchewan
- District created: 1994
- First contested: 1995
- Last contested: 2011

Demographics
- Electors: 14,660
- Census division: Division 6
- Census subdivision: Regina

Regina Qu'Appelle Valley was a provincial electoral district for the Legislative Assembly of Saskatchewan, Canada. This district included the Regina neighbourhoods of Fairways West, Lakeridge, Sherwood Estates, and Lakewood. It also included the communities of Pense and Grand Coulee.

This riding was created for the 22nd Saskatchewan general election out of the former constituency of Qu'Appelle-Lumsden.

== Members of the Legislative Assembly ==
| Parliament | Years | Member | Party |
|---|---|---|---|
| 23rd | 1995–1999 | Suzanne Murray | New Democrat |
| 24th | 1999–2003 | Mark Wartman | New Democrat |
| 25th | 2003–2007 | Mark Wartman | New Democrat |
| 26th | 2007–2011 | Laura Ross | Saskatchewan Party |
| 27th | 2011–2016 | Laura Ross | Saskatchewan Party |
District dissolved into Lumsden-Morse and Regina Rochdale

== Election results ==
2011 Saskatchewan general election
| Party | Candidate | Votes | % | ±% |
|---|---|---|---|---|
| Saskatchewan | Laura Ross | 6,269 | 63.57 | +20.98 |
| NDP | Steve Ryan | 3,359 | 34.06 | -6.54 |
| Green | Billy Patterson | 190 | 1.93 | +0.71 |
| Independent | Hafeez Chaudhuri | 44 | 0.44 | – |
| Total | | 9,862 | 100.00 | |

2007 Saskatchewan general election
| Party | Candidate | Votes | % | ±% |
|---|---|---|---|---|
| Saskatchewan | Laura Ross | 4,362 | 42.59 | +10.96 |
| NDP | Mark Wartman | 4,158 | 40.60 | -16.35 |
| Liberal | Michael Huber | 1,597 | 15.59 | +4.97 |
| Green | Nicolas Stulberg | 125 | 1.22 | +0.73 |
| Total | | 10,242 | 100.00 | |

2003 Saskatchewan general election
| Party | Candidate | Votes | % | ±% |
|---|---|---|---|---|
| New Democratic | Mark Wartman | 4,694 | 56.90 | +7.71 |
| Saskatchewan | Darlene Hnicks | 2,615 | 31.70 | +1.19 |
| Liberal | Marlin Belt | 875 | 10.61 | −9.70 |
| New Green | Kelsey Pearson | 39 | 0.47 | – |
| Western Independence | Angela Barabonoff | 27 | 0.33 | – |
| Total | | 8,250 | 100.00 | |

1999 Saskatchewan general election
| Party | Candidate | Votes | % | ±% |
|---|---|---|---|---|
| NDP | Mark Wartman | 3,641 | 49.24 | -5.95 |
| Saskatchewan | Murray Hugel | 2,251 | 30.44 | – |
| Liberal | Reina Sinclair | 1,502 | 20.32 | -18.85 |
| Total | | 7,394 | 100.00 | |

1995 Saskatchewan general election
| Party | Candidate | Votes | % | ±% |
|---|---|---|---|---|
| NDP | Suzanne Murray | 3,697 | 55.19 | – |
| Liberal | Anita Bergman | 2,624 | 39.17 | – |
| Prog. Conservative | Alice Miazga | 378 | 5.64 | – |
| Total | | 6,699 | 100.00 | |

== See also ==
- List of Saskatchewan provincial electoral districts
- List of Saskatchewan general elections
- Canadian provincial electoral districts
