= Suzanne Murray =

Canadian politician

Member of the Legislative Assembly of Saskatchewan
- In office 1991–1995
- Preceded by: John Gary Lane
- Succeeded by: riding dissolved
- Constituency: Qu'Appelle-Lumsden
- In office 1995–1999
- Preceded by: first member
- Succeeded by: Mark Wartman
- Constituency: Regina Qu'Appelle Valley

Personal details
- Born: 1943 (age 82–83)
- Party: New Democrat

Suzanne Murray is a former Canadian politician, who sat in the Legislative Assembly of Saskatchewan from 1991 to 1999. A member of the Saskatchewan New Democratic Party caucus, she represented the electoral districts of Qu'Appelle-Lumsden from 1991 to 1995, and Regina Qu'Appelle Valley from 1995 to 1999.
