= Harold Lane (Canadian politician) =

Canadian politician

Harold William Lane

MLA for Saskatoon Sutherland
- In office 1977–1978
- Preceded by: Evelyn Edwards
- Succeeded by: Peter Prebble

Personal details
- Born: 1945 (age 80–81)
- Party: Progressive Conservative

Harold William Lane (born 1945) is a former Canadian provincial politician. He was a Progressive Conservative member of the Legislative Assembly of Saskatchewan, representing the electoral district of Saskatoon Sutherland from 1977 until 1978.

He was first elected in a 1977 by-election following the death of Evelyn Edwards, but lost his seat to Peter Prebble of the New Democrats in the 1978 general election.
