= Saskatoon Sutherland =

Former provincial electoral district in Saskatchewan, Canada

Coordinates: 52.141°N 106.600°W

Saskatchewan electoral district
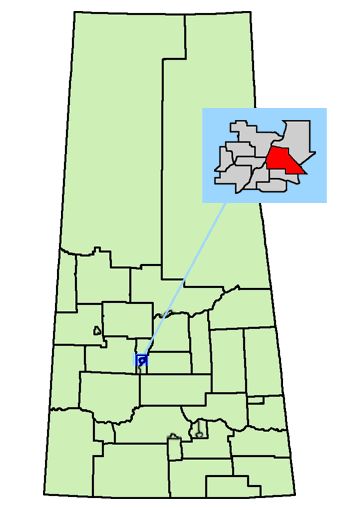

Defunct provincial electoral district
- Legislature: Legislative Assembly of Saskatchewan
- District created: 1975
- First contested: 1975
- Last contested: 2011

Demographics
- Electors: 9,939
- Census division(s): Division 11
- Census subdivision(s): Saskatoon

Saskatoon Sutherland was a provincial electoral district for the Legislative Assembly of Saskatchewan, Canada. It was last contested in the 2011 provincial election before being dissolved into Saskatoon Silverspring-Sutherland and Saskatoon University.

The district was first contested in the 1975 provincial election. In its initial form, it existed until the 1991 election, when it was merged with Saskatoon University to create the new district of Saskatoon Sutherland-University. The new district was renamed back to Saskatoon Sutherland before the 1995 election.

== Members of the Legislative Assembly ==
Parliament	Years	Member	Party
Saskatoon Sutherland
18th	1975–1976	Evelyn Edwards	Liberal
18th	1977–1978	Harold Lane	Progressive Conservative
19th	1978–1982	Peter Prebble	NDP
20th	1982–1986	Paul Schoenhals	Progressive Conservative
21st	1986–1991	Mark Koenker	NDP
Saskatoon Sutherland-University
22nd	1991–1995	Mark Koenker	NDP
Saskatoon Sutherland
23rd	1995–1999	Mark Koenker	NDP
24th	1999–2003	Graham Addley	NDP
25th	2003–2007	Graham Addley	NDP
26th	2007–2011	Joceline Schriemer	Saskatchewan Party
27th	2011–2016	Paul Merriman	Saskatchewan Party
District dissolved into Saskatoon Silverspring-Sutherland and Saskatoon University

== Election results ==
2011 Saskatchewan general election
Party	Candidate	Votes	%	±%
Saskatchewan	Paul Merriman	3,994	58.21	+14.36
NDP	Naveed Anwar	2,376	34.63	-6.01
Green	Larry Waldinger	305	4.45	+1.26
Liberal	Kaleb Jeffries	186	2.71	-9.61
Total		6,861	100.00	

2007 Saskatchewan general election
Party	Candidate	Votes	%	±%
Saskatchewan	Joceline Schriemer	3,679	43.85	+17.53
NDP	Graham Addley	3,410	40.64	-5.95
Liberal	Dave Parker	1,034	12.32	-13.30
Green	Lynn Oliphant	268	3.19	+1.72
Total		8,391	100.00	

2003 Saskatchewan general election
Party	Candidate	Votes	%	±%
NDP	Graham Addley	3,616	46.59	+2.17
Saskatchewan	Patrick Bundrock	2,043	26.32	-11.84
Liberal	Mark Kelleher	1,988	25.62	+8.20
New Green	Lynn Oliphant	114	1.47	*
Total		7,761	100.00	

1999 Saskatchewan general election
Party	Candidate	Votes	%	±%
NDP	Graham Addley	3,234	44.42	-4.69
Saskatchewan	Robin Bellamy	2,778	38.16	*
Liberal	Vernice McIntyre	1,268	17.42	-25.88
Total		7,280	100.00	

1995 Saskatchewan general election
Party	Candidate	Votes	%	±%
NDP	Mark Koenker	3,231	49.11	+2.14
Liberal	Robin Bellamy	2,849	43.30	+7.18
Prog. Conservative	Tim McGillvray	499	7.59	-9.32
Total		6,579	100.00	

1991 Saskatchewan general election: Saskatoon Sutherland-University
Party	Candidate	Votes	%	±%
NDP	Mark Koenker	4,034	46.97	*
Liberal	Robin Bellamy	3,102	36.12	*
Prog. Conservative	Jim Laing	1,452	16.91	*
Total		8,588	100.00	

== See also ==
- List of Saskatchewan provincial electoral districts
- List of Saskatchewan general elections
- Canadian provincial electoral districts
- Sutherland, Saskatoon
