= Saskatoon Fairview =

Provincial electoral district in Saskatchewan, Canada

Coordinates: 52°08′00″N 106°45′30″W

Saskatchewan electoral district

Provincial electoral district
- Legislature: Legislative Assembly of Saskatchewan
MLA
Vicki Mowat
New Democratic
- District created: 1982
- First contested: 1982
- Last contested: 2020

Demographics
- Population (2016): 19,746
- Electors (2017): 12,809
- Communities: Saskatoon

Saskatoon Fairview is a provincial electoral district for the Legislative Assembly of Saskatchewan, Canada. The district includes the neighbourhoods of Kensington, Parkridge, Pacific Heights, Blairmore Urban Centre, Confederation Park, and part of Massey Place. Contrary to the name, the neighbourhood of Fairhaven is not part of the riding.

The riding was created prior to the 1982 election from parts of Biggar, Saskatoon Westmount and Saskatoon Riversdale.

== Members of the Legislative Assembly ==
Legislature	Years	Member	Party
20th	1982–1986	Ray Weiman	Progressive Conservative
21st	1986–1991	Bob Mitchell	New Democrat
22nd	1991–1995	Bob Mitchell	New Democrat
23rd	1995–1999	Bob Mitchell	New Democrat
23rd	1999	Chris Axworthy	New Democrat
24th	1999–2003	Chris Axworthy	New Democrat
24th	2003	Andy Iwanchuk	New Democrat
25th	2003–2007	Andy Iwanchuk	New Democrat
26th	2007–2011	Andy Iwanchuk	New Democrat
27th	2011–2016	Jennifer Campeau	Saskatchewan Party
28th	2016–2017	Jennifer Campeau	Saskatchewan Party
28th	2017–2020	Vicki Mowat	New Democrat
29th	2020–2024	Vicki Mowat	New Democrat
30th	2024–present	Vicki Mowat	New Democrat

== Election results ==
2020 Saskatchewan general election
Party	Candidate	Votes	%	±%
New Democratic	Vicki Mowat	3,759	53.91	-6.53
Saskatchewan	Manny Sadhra	2,768	39.69	+8.52
Progressive Conservative	Tony Ollenberger	315	4.52	+1.83
Green	Tobi-Dawne Smith	131	1.88	+0.54
Total valid votes		6,973	99.01	
Total rejected ballots		70	0.99	+0.84
Turnout		7,043	47.20	+11.51
Eligible voters		14,923		
New Democratic hold		Swing		–
Source: Elections Saskatchewan

Saskatchewan provincial by-election, September 7, 2017 Resignation of Jennifer Campeau
Party	Candidate	Votes	%	±%
New Democratic	Vicki Mowat	2,759	60.44	+15.17
Saskatchewan	Cameron Scott	1,423	31.17	-17.07
Liberal	Shah Rukh	199	4.36	-0.68
Progressive Conservative	David Prokopchuk	123	2.69	-
Green	Taylor Bolin	61	1.34	-0.12
Total valid votes		4,565	99.85	
Total rejected ballots		7	0.15	-0.08
Turnout		4,572	35.69	-14.37
Eligible voters		12,809		
New Democratic gain from Saskatchewan		Swing		+16.12

2016 Saskatchewan general election
Party	Candidate	Votes	%	±%
Saskatchewan	Jennifer Campeau	2,951	48.24	-2.74
New Democratic	Vicki Mowat	2,769	45.27	-0.95
Liberal	Shah Rukh	308	5.04	-
Green	Debbie McGraw	89	1.45	-1.34
Total valid votes		6,117	99.77	
Total rejected ballots		14	0.23	+0.11
Turnout		6,131	50.06	-11.11
Eligible voters		12,247		
Saskatchewan hold		Swing		-0.89
Source: Elections Saskatchewan

^ Change is not based on redistributed results

2011 Saskatchewan general election
Party	Candidate	Votes	%	±%
Saskatchewan	Jennifer Campeau	2,644	50.98	+16.79
NDP	Andy Iwanchuk	2,397	46.22	-5.06
Green	Jan Norris	145	2.80	+0.63
Total valid votes		5,186	99.88	
Total rejected ballots		6	0.12	-0.15
Turnout		5,192	61.17	-14.51
Eligible voters		8,488		
Saskatchewan gain from New Democratic		Swing		+10.92

2007 Saskatchewan general election
Party	Candidate	Votes	%	±%
NDP	Andy Iwanchuk	3,272	51.28	-4.00
Saskatchewan	Eileen Gelowitz	2,182	34.20	+9.58
Liberal	Jim Pulfer	695	10.89	-7.57
Green	Shannon Dyck	138	2.16	+1.43
Prog. Conservative	James Yachyshen	94	1.47	+0.56
Total valid votes		6,381	99.73	
Total rejected ballots		17	0.27	
Turnout		6,398	75.68	
Eligible voters		8,454		
New Democratic hold		Swing		–

2003 Saskatchewan general election
Party	Candidate	Votes	%	±%
NDP	Andy Iwanchuk	3,105	55.28	+8.11
Saskatchewan	Jim McAllister	1,383	24.62	-0.95
Liberal	Rik Steernberg	1,037	18.46	-6.09
Prog. Conservative	Gwen Katzman	51	0.91	-
New Green	Jason Hanson	41	0.73	-1.98
Total		5,617	100.00	

March 17, 2003 By-Election: Saskatoon Fairview
Party	Candidate	Votes	%	±%
NDP	Andy Iwanchuk	1,428	47.17	-9.51
Saskatchewan	Ross Powell	774	25.57	+1.28
Liberal	Rik Steernberg	743	24.55	+10.69
New Green	Jason Hanson	82	2.71	+0.81
Total		3,027	100.00	

1999 Saskatchewan general election
Party	Candidate	Votes	%	±%
NDP	Chris Axworthy	2,653	56.68	-7.55
Saskatchewan	Sandra Rees	1,137	24.29	+3.11
Liberal	Barry Anderson	649	13.86	+1.67
Prog. Conservative	Gwen Katzman	153	3.27	-
New Green	Lynn Oliphant	89	1.90	-0.50
Total		4,681	100.00	

June 28, 1999 By-Election: Saskatoon Fairview
Party	Candidate	Votes	%	±%
NDP	Chris Axworthy	1,871	64.23	-0.56
Saskatchewan	Harry Meyers	617	21.18	*
Liberal	Barry Anderson	355	12.19	-12.70
New Green	Neil Sinclair	70	2.40	*
Total		2,913	100.00	

1995 Saskatchewan general election
Party	Candidate	Votes	%	±%
NDP	Bob Mitchell	3,100	64.79	-1.79
Liberal	Loretta McIntyre	1,191	24.89	+1.59
Prog. Conservative	Tom McConnell	406	8.48	-1.64
Independent	Helen Quewezance	88	1.84	*
Total		4,785	100.00	

1991 Saskatchewan general election
Party	Candidate	Votes	%	±%
NDP	Bob Mitchell	5,955	66.58	+6.11
Liberal	Bill Mellof	2,084	23.30	+14.92
Prog. Conservative	Gaby Akl	905	10.12	-21.03
Total		8,944	100.00	

1986 Saskatchewan general election
Party	Candidate	Votes	%	±%
NDP	Bob Mitchell	6,539	60.47	+26.31
Prog. Conservative	Ross G. McQuarrie	3,368	31.15	-30.42
Liberal	Al Cebryk	906	8.38	+6.58
Total		10,813	100.00	

1982 Saskatchewan general election
Party	Candidate	Votes	%	±%
Prog. Conservative	Ray Weiman	6,185	61.57	*
NDP	Bob Mitchell	3,432	34.16	*
Western Canada Concept	Brian Bellamy	200	1.99	*
Liberal	David Schwartz	181	1.80	*
Aboriginal People's	John Dorion	48	0.48	*
Total		10,046	100.00	

== See also ==
- List of Saskatchewan provincial electoral districts
- List of Saskatchewan general elections
- Canadian provincial electoral districts
