= Evelyn Edwards =

Canadian politician

MLA for Saskatoon Sutherland
- In office 1975–1976
- Preceded by: first member
- Succeeded by: Harold Lane

Personal details
- Born: 1923 Colonsay, Saskatchewan
- Died: 1976 (aged 52–53)
- Party: Liberal

Evelyn Grace Edwards (1923–September 17, 1976) was a Canadian registered nurse and provincial politician. She was a Liberal member of the Legislative Assembly of Saskatchewan, representing the electoral district of Saskatoon Sutherland from 1975 until her death in 1976.

She was born and educated in Colonsay, Saskatchewan. She graduated as a nurse from Saskatoon City Hospital. She married W. Arnold Edwards. Edwards was a trustee for Saskatoon City Hospital and served on its board of governors from 1972 to 1974. She was president of the Saskatchewan Hospital Association in 1975, a founding member of the Parkinson's Disease Foundation and a board member of the Saskatoon Council on Aging. Edwards also served as a board member at the Saskatoon and provincial levels for the Canadian National Institute for the Blind. She was a member of Saskatoon City Council from 1966 to 1971. She resigned her council seat to run for mayor of the city in 1971, but lost to Bert Sears.
