= Mark Koenker =

Canadian politician

E. Mark Koenker

MLA for Saskatoon Sutherland/Saskatoon Sutherland-University
- In office 1986–1999
- Preceded by: Paul Schoenhals
- Succeeded by: Graham Addley

Personal details
- Born: September 11, 1947 (age 79) Chicago, Illinois, U.S.
- Party: New Democratic Party
- Education: Valparaiso University
- Occupation: Pastor

E. Mark Koenker (born September 11, 1947) is a Canadian former provincial politician and minister in the Lutheran Church of Canada. He was a New Democratic member of the Legislative Assembly of Saskatchewan from 1986 to 1999, representing the electoral districts of Saskatoon Sutherland and Saskatoon Sutherland-University.
