= Jennifer Campeau =

Canadian politician

Member of the Saskatchewan Legislative Assembly for Saskatoon Fairview
- In office November 7, 2011 – July 2, 2017
- Preceded by: Andy Iwanchuk
- Succeeded by: Vicki Mowat

Personal details
- Born: 1973 (age 52–53)
- Party: Saskatchewan Party

Jennifer Campeau (born 1973) is a former Canadian politician, who was elected to the Legislative Assembly of Saskatchewan in the 2011 election and was re-elected in 2016. She represented the electoral district of Saskatoon Fairview as a member of the Saskatchewan Party caucus.

She served as Minister of Central Services from 2014 to 2016 and as legislative secretary to the minister of education for First Nations student achievement from 2016 to 2017.

Campeau resigned from the legislature effective July 2, 2017 to accept a job with mining company Rio Tinto in British Columbia.

== Cabinet positions ==
Saskatchewan provincial government of Brad Wall
Cabinet post (1)
Predecessor	Office	Successor
Nancy Heppner	Minister of Central Services; June 5, 2014–August 23, 2016	Christine Tell
