= Prince Albert Carlton =

Provincial electoral district in Saskatchewan, Canada

Saskatchewan electoral district
- Coordinates: 53.190°N 105.738°W

Provincial electoral district
- Legislature: Legislative Assembly of Saskatchewan
MLA
Kevin Kasun
Saskatchewan
- First contested: 1991
- Last contested: 2024

Demographics
- Electors: 9,588
- Communities: Prince Albert

Prince Albert Carlton is a provincial electoral district (a "riding") for the Legislative Assembly of Saskatchewan, Canada. The riding was last contested in the 2024 general election, with Kevin Kasun being in as MLA for the Saskatchewan Party.

One of two provincial constituencies for the city of Prince Albert, the other being Prince Albert Northcote, the riding's northern boundary follows 15th Street (Hwy. 302) from east to west; then curves south along 9th/10th Avenue West to 28th Street, which the boundary follows westward until the city limits.

== History ==
The riding was created in 1989 out of Prince Albert and Prince Albert-Duck Lake and was first contested in the 1991 general election. Its boundaries have remained generally the same since its creation, aside from several minor changes (mostly involving the riding's northern boundary with Prince Albert Northcote) during province-wide electoral redistributions completed prior to the 1995, 2003, 2016 and 2024 general elections.

Since being created, the riding has returned members of the New Democratic and Saskatchewan Parties. The initial New Democratic Party MLA, Myron Kowalsky, was elected in every general election between 1991 and 2007. After Kowalsky's retirement in 2007, Saskatchewan Party candidate Darryl Hickie won by a thin majority of 62 votes, and the constituency has returned Saskatchewan Party candidates ever since.

== Members of the Legislative Assembly ==
Legislature	Years	Member	Party
22nd	1991–1995	Myron Kowalsky	New Democratic Party
23rd	1995–1999	Myron Kowalsky	New Democratic Party
24th	1999–2003	Myron Kowalsky	New Democratic Party
25th	2003–2007	Myron Kowalsky	New Democratic Party
26th	2007–2011	Darryl Hickie	Saskatchewan Party
27th	2011–2015	Darryl Hickie	Saskatchewan Party
28th	2016–2020	Joe Hargrave	Saskatchewan Party
29th	2020–2024	Joe Hargrave	Saskatchewan Party
30th	2024-present	Kevin Kasun	Saskatchewan Party

== Election results ==
=== 2024 ===
2024 Saskatchewan general election
Party	Candidate	Votes	%	±%
Saskatchewan	Kevin Kasun	3,007	51.53	-6.4
New Democratic	Carolyn Brost Strom	2,533	43.40	+5.4
Saskatchewan United	Denneil Carpenter	230	3.94	
Green	Andrew Muirhead	66	1.13	-0.5
Total valid votes		5,836	99.73	
Total rejected ballots		16	0.27	
Turnout		5,852		
Eligible voters		–		
Source: Elections Saskatchewan
Saskatchewan hold		Swing		–5.9

=== 2020 ===
2020 provincial election redistributed results
Party	%
Saskatchewan	57.9
New Democratic	38.0
Progressive Conservative	2.5
Green	1.6

2020 Saskatchewan general election
Party	Candidate	Votes	%	±%
Saskatchewan	Joe Hargrave	3,867	57.68	+2.87
New Democratic	Troy Parenteau	2,563	38.23	-2.88
Progressive Conservative	Renee Grasby	175	2.61	-
Green	Shirley Davis	99	1.48	+0.56
Total valid votes		6,704	99.39	
Total rejected ballots		41	0.61	–
Turnout		6,745	–	–
Eligible voters		–		
Saskatchewan hold		Swing		–
Source: Elections Saskatchewan

=== 2016 ===
2016 Saskatchewan general election
Party	Candidate	Votes	%	±%
Saskatchewan	Joe Hargrave	3,553	54.81	-5.36
New Democratic	Shayne Lazarowich	2,670	41.11	+3.55
Liberal	Winston McKay	199	3.07	-
Green	Asia Yellowtail	60	0.92	-1.32
Total valid votes		–	100.0	
Eligible voters		–		
Saskatchewan hold		Swing		-
Source: Elections Saskatchewan

=== 2011 ===
2011 Saskatchewan general election
Party	Candidate	Votes	%	±%
Saskatchewan	Darryl Hickie	4,284	60.17	+12.84
New Democratic	Ted Zurakowski	2,674	37.56	-8.99
Green	George Morin	162	2.27	+0.92
Total		7,120	100.00	
Saskatchewan hold		Swing		-

=== 2007 ===
2007 Saskatchewan general election
Party	Candidate	Votes	%	±%
Saskatchewan	Darryl Hickie	3,675	47.33	+18.67
New Democratic	Chad Nilson	3,614	46.55	-12.04
Liberal	Jill Swenson	370	4.77	-6.51
Green	Steve Lawrence	105	1.35	+0.27
Total		7,764	100.00	
Saskatchewan gain from New Democratic		Swing		-

=== 2003 ===
2003 Saskatchewan general election
Party	Candidate	Votes	%	±%
New Democratic	Myron Kowalsky	3,865	58.59	+4.55
Saskatchewan	Bert Provost	1,891	28.66	-1.16
Liberal	Carman Cripps	744	11.28	-4.86
New Green	Jayna Lacey	71	1.08	*
Independent	Davey R. Clinton	26	0.39	*
Total		6,597	100.00	
New Democratic hold		Swing		-

=== 1999 ===
1999 Saskatchewan general election
Party	Candidate	Votes	%	±%
New Democratic	Myron Kowalsky	3,157	54.04	-0.07
Saskatchewan	Bert Provost	1,742	29.82	*
Liberal	Dan Pinto	943	16.14	-16.01
Total		5,842	100.00	
New Democratic hold		Swing		-

=== 1995 ===
1995 Saskatchewan general election
Party	Candidate	Votes	%	±%
New Democratic	Myron Kowalsky	3,321	54.11	-5.59
Liberal	Anil Pandila	1,973	32.15	+10.55
Progressive Conservative	Kris Eggum	843	13.74	-4.96
Total		6,137	100.00	
New Democratic hold		Swing		-

=== 1991 ===
1991 Saskatchewan general election
Party	Candidate	Votes	%	±%
New Democratic	Myron Kowalsky	5,218	59.70	*
Liberal	Richard Stewart	1,888	21.60	*
Progressive Conservative	Bert Provost	1,635	18.70	*
Total		8,741	100.00	
New Democratic pickup new district.				

== See also ==
- List of Saskatchewan provincial electoral districts
- List of Saskatchewan general elections
- Canadian provincial electoral districts
