= Saskatoon Silverspring =

Saskatchewan electoral district

Provincial electoral district
- Legislature: Legislative Assembly of Saskatchewan
MLA
Hugh Gordon
New Democratic
- District created: 2022
- First contested: 30th
- Communities: Saskatoon

Saskatoon Silverspring is a provincial electoral district for the Legislative Assembly of Saskatchewan, Canada.

The riding was created by redistribution in 2022, and was created from portions of Saskatoon Silverspring-Sutherland and Saskatoon Willowgrove. It will be first contested in the 30th Saskatchewan general election.

== Election results ==
2024 Saskatchewan general election
Party	Candidate	Votes	%	±%
New Democratic	Hugh Gordon	4,435	51.43	+15.93
Saskatchewan	Paul Merriman	3,999	46.37	-15.13
Green	Jackie Hanson	190	2.20	-0.80
Total valid votes		8,624	99.01	
Total rejected ballots		86	0.99	
Turnout		8,710	62.28	
Eligible voters		13,985		
Source: Elections Saskatchewan
New Democratic gain		Swing		

2020 provincial election redistributed results
Party	%
Saskatchewan	61.5
New Democratic	35.5
Green	3.0
