= Regina Rochdale =

Provincial electoral district in Saskatchewan, Canada

Saskatchewan electoral district

Provincial electoral district
- Legislature: Legislative Assembly of Saskatchewan
MLA
Joan Pratchler
New Democratic
- District created: 2013
- First contested: 2016
- Last contested: 2024
- Communities: Regina

Regina Rochdale is a provincial electoral district for the Legislative Assembly of Saskatchewan, Canada. It was first contested in the 2016 election.

== Members of the Legislative Assembly ==
Legislature	Years	Member	Party
District created from a portion of Regina Qu'Appelle Valley
28th	2016–2020	Laura Ross	Saskatchewan Party
29th	2020–2024	Laura Ross	Saskatchewan Party
30th	2024–present	Joan Pratchler	New Democratic Party

== Election results ==
2024 Saskatchewan general election
Party	Candidate	Votes	%	±%
New Democratic	Joan Pratchler	4,528	52.60	+13.0
Saskatchewan	Laura Ross	3,920	45.53	-10.4
Green	Irene Browatzke	161	1.87	+0.1
Total valid votes		8,609	99.72	
Total rejected ballots		24	0.28	
Turnout		8,633		
Eligible voters		–		
Source: Elections Saskatchewan
New Democratic gain from Saskatchewan		Swing		+11.7

2020 provincial election redistributed results
Party	%
Saskatchewan	55.9
New Democratic	39.6
Green	1.8
Others	2.7

2020 Saskatchewan general election
Party	Candidate	Votes	%	±%
Saskatchewan	Laura Ross	5,981	56.18	-2.86
New Democratic	Brett Estey	4,140	38.88	+2.51
Progressive Conservative	Murray Morhart	317	2.98	–
Green	Sarah Risk	209	1.96	+0.37
Total valid votes		10,647	99.27	
Total rejected ballots		78	0.73	–
Turnout		10,725	62.85	–
Eligible voters		17,065		
Saskatchewan hold		Swing		–
Source: Elections Saskatchewan

2016 Saskatchewan general election
Party	Candidate	Votes	%	±%
Saskatchewan	Laura Ross	5,769	59.04	–
New Democratic	Brett Estey	3,554	36.37	–
Liberal	Nadeem Islam	293	3.00	–
Green	Billy Patterson	155	1.59	–
Total valid votes		9,771	100.0	
Eligible voters		–		
Source: Elections Saskatchewan

== See also ==
- List of Saskatchewan provincial electoral districts
- List of Saskatchewan general elections
- Canadian provincial electoral districts
