= Kevin Kasun =

Canadian politician

Kevin Kasun MLA

Member of the Saskatchewan Legislative Assembly for Prince Albert Carlton
- Incumbent
- Assumed office October 28, 2024
- Preceded by: Joe Hargrave

Personal details
- Party: Saskatchewan Party

Kevin Kasun is a Canadian politician who was elected to the Legislative Assembly of Saskatchewan in the 2024 general election, representing Prince Albert Carlton as a member of the Saskatchewan Party.
