= Paul Merriman =

Canadian politician

The Honourable Paul Merriman ECS

Member of the Saskatchewan Legislative Assembly for Saskatoon Silverspring-Sutherland Saskatoon Sutherland (2011–2016)
- In office November 7, 2011 – October 1, 2024
- Preceded by: Joceline Schriemer
- Succeeded by: Hugh Gordon

Leader of the Government in the Legislative Assembly of Saskatchewan
- In office August 23, 2016 – August 30, 2017
- Premier: Brad Wall
- Preceded by: Ken Cheveldayoff
- Succeeded by: Greg Brkich

Personal details
- Born: Toronto, Ontario, Canada
- Party: Saskatchewan Party
- Profession: Management

Paul Merriman is a Canadian politician. He is a former member of Legislative Assembly of Saskatchewan (MLA), representing the electoral district of Saskatoon Silverspring-Sutherland from 2011 to 2024 as a member of the Saskatchewan Party. Merriman was a cabinet minister in the governments of both Brad Wall and Scott Moe.

== Early life and career ==
Merriman is the son of Ted Merriman, who was himself a Saskatchewan Party MLA from 2003 to 2007. Merriman was born and raised in Toronto. The Merriman family moved to Saskatchewan in 1988, and Paul Merriman has worked in Saskatoon since 1994. He worked for SaskEnergy for nearly a decade, and before entering politics was the executive director of the Saskatoon Food Bank & Learning Centre, where he prioritized cutting costs. He has also been a small business owner.

== Political career ==
Merriman was acclaimed as the Saskatchewan Party candidate for Saskatoon Sutherland ahead of the 2011 election after incumbent Joceline Schriemer announced that she would not be running again. He was elected in the November general election. Merriman was re-elected in the 2016 election in the newly established riding of Saskatoon Silverspring-Sutherland, and re-elected in 2020.

Merriman was named Minister of Social Services in Brad Wall's government in 2017, a role he carried over to Scott Moe's government when Moe succeeded Wall as Premier in 2018. During the federal government's efforts to work with provinces to roll out national childcare in 2019, Merriman was criticized for comments he made stating that provincial ministers should have been able to have meetings with the federal government without Indigenous representatives present, whom Merriman characterized as "lobbyists". In response, Assembly of First Nations Chief Perry Bellegarde wrote Merriman a letter, explaining that he was also an elected representative. Merriman later said he regretted the use of the term lobbyist. That same year, Merriman introduced reforms to Saskatchewan's welfare programs. The reform replaced existing programs with a new program called Saskatchewan Income Support (SIS). Merriman stated that the reform was meant to reduce bureaucracy, increase independence, and prioritize "motivational interviewing" on the part of social workers. The government also stopped direct rent payments on behalf of program recipients. The reforms were criticized by anti-poverty advocates for actually increasing bureaucracy and offering inadequate support to recipients.

In November 2020, Merriman was named Minister of Health during the province's second wave of the COVID-19 pandemic. Although the province's case numbers were rising, Merriman called them "manageable" and downplayed the need for further public health measures, signalling a prioritization of access to vaccines. Beginning in late 2020, the province's health care system became severely strained by COVID, ultimately resulting in the province signing agreements to transfer intensive care unit (ICU) patients out-of-province in late 2021. Merriman was criticized for a lack of availability. In April 2021, Merriman and Moe declined an invitation to tour a Regina ICU; hospital staff had issued the invitation, stating that "If only the leadership would come and see what's really going on here, they would understand what we're dealing with." In response, Merriman stated that he did not think it would be "appropriate" to accept the invitation. In the summer and fall of 2021, Merriman stopped attending press conferences for more than a month, leading to calls for his resignation, although he claimed to have been working with his staff during this absence. After a 2023 Global News investigation showed that the province's chief medical health officer, Saqib Shahab, had urged the government to implement further public health measures in the fall of 2021 to ease the strain on the health care system—something Shahab had publicly hinted himself at the time—Merriman declined an interview but stated in question period only that the province had acted on Shahab's advice.

In August 2023, Moe shuffled his cabinet and named Merriman the new Minister of Corrections, Policing and Public Safety.

Merriman was defeated in the 2024 provincial election by Hugh Gordon of the New Democratic Party.

== Personal life ==
Merriman is married to Leanne Durand, and the couple have four children.

== Electoral record ==
2024 Saskatchewan general election: Saskatoon Silverspring
Party	Candidate	Votes	%
New Democratic	Hugh Gordon	4,435	51.43
Saskatchewan	Paul Merriman	3,999	46.37
Green	Jackie Hanson	190	2.20
Total		8,624	100.00
Source: Elections Saskatchewan

2020 Saskatchewan general election: Saskatoon Silverspring-Sutherland
Party	Candidate	Votes	%
Saskatchewan	Paul Merriman	4,272	59.07
New Democratic	Tajinder Grewal	2,737	37.85
Green	Jaime Fairley	223	3.08
Total		7,232	100.0
Source: Elections Saskatchewan

2016 Saskatchewan general election: Saskatoon Silverspring-Sutherland
Party	Candidate	Votes	%
Saskatchewan	Paul Merriman	4,482	63.69
New Democratic	Zaigham Kayani	2,003	28.46
Liberal	James Gorin	303	4.31
Green	Evangeline V.K. Godron	127	1.80
Progressive Conservative	Jeff Wortman	122	1.73
Total		7,037	100.0
Source: Saskatchewan Archives - Election Results by Electoral Division; Elections Saskatchewan

2011 Saskatchewan general election: Saskatoon Sutherland
Party	Candidate	Votes	%
Saskatchewan	Paul Merriman	3,994	58.21
New Democratic	Naveed Anwar	2,376	34.63
Green	Larry Waldinger	305	4.45
Liberal	Kaleb Jeffries	186	2.71
Total		7,037	100.0
Source: Saskatchewan Archives - Election Results by Electoral Division

== Cabinet positions ==
Saskatchewan provincial government of Scott Moe
Cabinet posts (3)
Predecessor	Office	Successor
Christine Tell	Minister of Corrections, Policing and Public Safety; August 29, 2023 – November 7, 2024	Tim McLeod
Jim Reiter	Minister of Health; November 9, 2020 – August 29, 2023	Everett Hindley
cont'd from Wall Ministry	Minister of Social Services; February 2, 2018 – November 9, 2020	Lori Carr
Saskatchewan provincial government of Brad Wall
Cabinet post (1)
Predecessor	Office	Successor
Tina Beaudry-Mellor	Minister of Social Services; August 30, 2017 – February 2, 2018	cont'd into Moe Ministry
