= Saskatoon Silverspring-Sutherland =

Provincial electoral district in Saskatchewan, Canada

Saskatchewan electoral district

Defunct provincial electoral district
- Legislature: Legislative Assembly of Saskatchewan
- District created: 2013
- First contested: 2016
- Last contested: 2020
- Communities: Saskatoon

Saskatoon Silverspring-Sutherland is a provincial electoral district for the Legislative Assembly of Saskatchewan, Canada. It succeeded the former Saskatoon Sutherland and Saskatoon Silver Springs ridings and was first contested in the 2016 election. It will be dissolved into Saskatoon Silverspring, Saskatoon University-Sutherland, and Saskatoon Chief Mistawasis before the next general election.

== Members of the Legislative Assembly ==
Legislature	Years	Member	Party
See Saskatoon Sutherland and Saskatoon Silver Springs 1975–2016.
28th	2016–2020	Paul Merriman	Saskatchewan Party
29th	2020–2024	Paul Merriman	Saskatchewan Party

== Election results ==
2020 Saskatchewan general election
Party	Candidate	Votes	%	±%
Saskatchewan	Paul Merriman	4,272	59.07	-4.62
New Democratic	Tajinder Grewal	2,737	37.85	+9.25
Green	Jaime Fairley	223	3.08	+1.28
Total valid votes		7,232	98.97	
Total rejected ballots		75	1.03	–
Turnout		7,307	54.33	–
Eligible voters		13,449		
Saskatchewan hold		Swing		–
Source: Elections Saskatchewan

2016 Saskatchewan general election
Party	Candidate	Votes	%	±%
Saskatchewan	Paul Merriman	4,482	63.69	–
New Democratic	Zaigham Kayani	2,003	28.46	–
Liberal	James Gorin	303	4.31	–
Green	Evangeline V.K. Godron	127	1.80	–
Progressive Conservative	Jeff Wortman	122	1.73	–
Total valid votes		7,037	100.0	
Eligible voters		–		
Source: Elections Saskatchewan

== See also ==
- List of Saskatchewan provincial electoral districts
- List of Saskatchewan general elections
- Canadian provincial electoral districts
