= Chris Neiszner =

Canadian ice hockey player

- Born: February 4, 1984 (age 41); Craik, Saskatchewan, Canada
- Height: 5 ft 10 in (178 cm)
- Weight: 194 lb (88 kg; 13 st 12 lb)
- Position: Centre
- Shot: Right
- Played for: AHL; Omaha Ak-Sar-Ben Knights; Texas Stars; ECHL; Las Vegas Wranglers
- NHL draft: Undrafted
- Playing career: 2005–2010

Chris Neiszner (born February 4, 1984) is a Canadian former professional ice hockey player. He is currently an assistant coach with the Red Deer Rebels of the Western Hockey League (WHL), and plays with the Bentley Generals of the Senior AAA Chinook Hockey League.

Prior to turning professional, Neiszner played four seasons of major junior hockey with the Red Deer Rebels of the WHL.

On November 26, 2005, while playing with the Las Vegas Wranglers of the ECHL, Neiszner scored his first professional goal against the visiting Victoria Salmon Kings.
