= Joe Hargrave =

Canadian politician

The Honourable Joe Hargrave ECS

Member of the Saskatchewan Legislative Assembly for Prince Albert Carlton
- In office April 4, 2016 – October 1, 2024
- Preceded by: Darryl Hickie
- Succeeded by: Kevin Kasun

Reeve of the Rural Municipality of Corman Park No. 344
- Incumbent
- Assumed office November 13, 2024
- Preceded by: Judy Harwood

President of the Saskatchewan Party
- Incumbent
- Assumed office November 8, 2025
- Preceded by: Bevra Fee

Personal details
- Born: Chelan, Saskatchewan
- Party: Saskatchewan Party
- Profession: Business owner

Joe Hargrave is a Canadian politician, who served as the Member for the Legislative Assembly of Saskatchewan for the electoral district of Prince Albert Carlton from 2016 until 2024. He was first elected in the 2016 provincial election, when he succeeded retiring Saskatchewan Party MLA Darryl Hickie. He is a member of the Saskatchewan Party.

Hargrave was selected as the Saskatchewan Party candidate in a heavily contested nomination meeting, which was conducted in the Prince Albert Exhibition Centre. Hargrave based his nomination strategy on an economic focus, saying that a strong economy would also include access to healthcare and other public goods, and suggesting that his own experience in business would make him a good representative.

On August 23, 2016, Hargrave was named to the Executive Council of Saskatchewan as the Minister of Crown Investments Corporation, the Minister Responsible for Saskatchewan Government Insurance and Minister Responsible for Saskatchewan Transportation Company.

He was shuffled to become Minister of Highways on November 9, 2020.

On January 4, 2021, Hargrave announced his resignation from cabinet after facing criticism, amidst the COVID-19 pandemic in Saskatchewan and closure of the border between Canada and the United States, for going on a personal trip to Palm Springs, California to finalise the sale of a home there, in contradiction of recommendations issued by the province. He did not run for re-election in 2024.

Hargrave was elected as deputy speaker of the legislative assembly on October 28, 2021, and served in the role until August 29, 2023. On that day, Hargrave was re-appointed to cabinet as Minister of SaskBuilds and Procurement.

Hargrave announced he would not be seeking re-election in the 2024 general election on May 27, 2024 and was shuffled out of cabinet on the same day.

Hargrave was acclaimed as reeve of Rural Municipality of Corman Park No. 344 in the 2024 Saskatchewan municipal elections.

On November 8, 2025, Hargrave was elected as the president of the Saskatchewan Party.

== Electoral history ==
2020 Saskatchewan general election: Prince Albert Carlton
Party	Candidate	Votes	%
Saskatchewan	Joe Hargrave	3,867	57.68
New Democratic	Troy Parenteau	2,563	38.23
Progressive Conservative	Renee Grasby	175	2.61
Green	Shirley Davis	99	1.48
Total		6,704	99.39
Source: Elections Saskatchewan

2016 Saskatchewan general election: Prince Albert Carlton
Party	Candidate	Votes	%
Saskatchewan	Joe Hargrave	3,553	54.81
New Democratic	Shayne Lazarowich	2,670	41.11
Liberal	Winston McKay	199	3.07
Green	Asia Yellowtail	60	0.92
Total		–	100.0
Source: Elections Saskatchewan

== Cabinet positions ==
Saskatchewan provincial government of Scott Moe
Cabinet posts (3)
Predecessor	Office	Successor
Lori Carr	Minister of SaskBuilds and Procurement; August 29, 2023–May 27, 2024	Terry Jenson
Greg Ottenbreit	Minister of Highways; November 9, 2020–January 4, 2021	Fred Bradshaw
cont'd from Wall Ministry	Minister of Crown Investments; February 2, 2018–November 9, 2020	Don Morgan
Saskatchewan provincial government of Brad Wall
Cabinet post (1)
Predecessor	Office	Successor
Jim Reiter	Minister of Crown Investments; August 23, 2016–February 2, 2018	cont'd into Moe Ministry
