= Prince Albert Northcote =

Provincial electoral district in Saskatchewan, Canada

Saskatchewan electoral district
- Coordinates: 53.223°N 105.677°W

Provincial electoral district
- Legislature: Legislative Assembly of Saskatchewan
MLA
Alana Ross
Saskatchewan
- First contested: 1991
- Last contested: 2024

Demographics
- Electors: 8,124
- Communities: Prince Albert

Prince Albert Northcote is a provincial electoral district for the Legislative Assembly of Saskatchewan, Canada. One of two provincial constituencies for the city of Prince Albert, the other being Prince Albert Carlton, the riding's southern boundary follows 15th Street (Hwy. 302) from east to west; then curves south along 9th/10th Avenue West to 28th Street, which the boundary follows westward until the city limits.

The riding was last contested in the 2020 general election, when Saskatchewan Party candidate Alana Ross defeated incumbent NDP MLA Nicole Rancourt.

== History ==
Prince Albert Northcote was created in 1989 out of parts of Prince Albert, Prince Albert-Duck Lake and Shellbrook-Torch River. It was first contested in the 1991 general election. Its boundaries have remained generally the same since its creation, aside from several minor changes (mostly involving the riding's southern boundary with Prince Albert Carlton) during province-wide electoral redistributions completed prior to the 1995, 2003, 2016 and 2024 general elections.

From its creation through the 2007 general election, Prince Albert Northcote returned New Democratic Party MLAs. Since the 2011 general election, however, the riding has been one of the most competitive in the province, and has changed parties in each general election since 2011. In the 2011 general election, Victoria Jurgens won the seat for the Saskatchewan Party by 191 votes. In the 2016 general election, NDP candidate Nicole Rancourt won the riding by 261 votes. In the 2020 general election, Saskatchewan Party candidate Alana Ross won the riding with a 195-vote plurality.

== Members of the Legislative Assembly ==
| Legislature | Years | Member | Party |
|---|---|---|---|
| 22nd | 1991–1995 | Eldon Lautermilch | New Democratic Party |
| 23rd | 1995–1999 | Eldon Lautermilch | New Democratic Party |
| 24th | 1999–2003 | Eldon Lautermilch | New Democratic Party |
| 25th | 2003–2007 | Eldon Lautermilch | New Democratic Party |
| 26th | 2007–2011 | Darcy Furber | New Democratic Party |
| 27th | 2011–2016 | Victoria Jurgens | Saskatchewan Party |
| 28th | 2016–2020 | Nicole Rancourt | New Democratic Party |
| 29th | 2020–2024 | Alana Ross | Saskatchewan Party |
| 30th | 2024-present | Alana Ross | Saskatchewan Party |

== Election results ==
=== 2024 ===
2024 Saskatchewan general election
| Party | Candidate | Votes | % | ±% |
|---|---|---|---|---|
| Saskatchewan | Alana Ross | 2,841 | 47.8 | -1.5 |
| New Democratic | Nicole Rancourt | 2,708 | 45.5 | +0.5 |
| Saskatchewan United | Terri Davis | 298 | 5.0 | |
| Green | Jarren Jones | 100 | 1.7 | -0.1 |
| Total valid votes | | 5,947 | | |
| Total rejected ballots | | | | |
| Turnout | | | | |
| Eligible voters | | – | | |
| Saskatchewan hold | | Swing | | - |
Source: Elections Saskatchewan

=== 2020 ===
2020 provincial election redistributed results
| Party | % |
|---|---|
| Saskatchewan | 49.3 |
| New Democratic | 45.0 |
| Green | 1.8 |

2020 Saskatchewan general election
| Party | Candidate | Votes | % | ±% |
|---|---|---|---|---|
| Saskatchewan | Alana Ross | 2,652 | 48.25 | +3.80 |
| New Democratic | Nicole Rancourt | 2,457 | 44.70 | -4.41 |
| Progressive Conservative | Jaret Nikolaisen | 215 | 3.91 | |
| Green | Sarah Kraynick | 106 | 1.92 | +0.35 |
| Total valid votes | | 5,496 | 99.14 | |
| Total rejected ballots | | 47 | 0.86 | – |
| Turnout | | 5,477 | 37.50 | – |
| Eligible voters | | 14,607 | | |
| Saskatchewan gain from New Democratic | | Swing | | – |
Source: Elections Saskatchewan

=== 2016 ===
2016 Saskatchewan general election
| Party | Candidate | Votes | % | ±% |
|---|---|---|---|---|
| New Democratic | Nicole Rancourt | 2,752 | 49.11 | +2.28 |
| Saskatchewan | Victoria Jurgens | 2,491 | 44.45 | -5.78 |
| Liberal | Jonathan Fraser | 272 | 4.85 | - |
| Green | Trace Yellowtail | 88 | 1.57 | -1.37 |
| Total valid votes | | 5,603 | 100.0 | |
| Eligible voters | | – | | |
| New Democratic gain from Saskatchewan | | Swing | | - |
Source: Elections Saskatchewan

=== 2011 ===
2011 Saskatchewan general election
| Party | Candidate | Votes | % | ±% |
|---|---|---|---|---|
| Saskatchewan | Victoria Jurgens | 2,816 | 50.23 | +15.82 |
| New Democratic | Darcy Furber | 2,625 | 46.83 | -6.50 |
| Green | Raymond Bandet | 165 | 2.94 | +0.60 |
| Total | | 5,606 | 100.00 | |
| Saskatchewan gain from New Democratic | | Swing | | - |

=== 2007 ===
2007 Saskatchewan general election
| Party | Candidate | Votes | % | ±% |
|---|---|---|---|---|
| New Democratic | Darcy Furber | 3,301 | 53.33 | -3.56 |
| Saskatchewan | Kevin Shiach | 2,130 | 34.41 | +7.51 |
| Liberal | Colin Fraser | 614 | 9.92 | -3.64 |
| Green | Ray Johnson | 145 | 2.34 | -0.31 |
| Total | | 6,190 | 100.00 | |
| New Democratic hold | | Swing | | - |

=== 2003 ===
2003 Saskatchewan general election
| Party | Candidate | Votes | % | ±% |
|---|---|---|---|---|
| New Democratic | Eldon Lautermilch | 3,286 | 56.89 | +7.25 |
| Saskatchewan | Peter V. Abrametz | 1,554 | 26.90 | +11.84 |
| Liberal | Brent Zbraschuk | 783 | 13.56 | -19.04 |
| New Green | Ben Webster | 153 | 2.65 | * |
| Total | | 5,776 | 100.00 | |
| New Democratic hold | | Swing | | - |

=== 1999 ===
1999 Saskatchewan general election
| Party | Candidate | Votes | % | ±% |
|---|---|---|---|---|
| New Democratic | Eldon Lautermilch | 2,485 | 49.64 | -9.11 |
| Liberal | Jim Stiglitz | 1,632 | 32.60 | +6.82 |
| Saskatchewan | Pauline Provost | 754 | 15.06 | * |
| Progressive Conservative | Kevin Shiach | 135 | 2.70 | -12.77 |
| Total | | 5,006 | 100.00 | |
| New Democratic hold | | Swing | | - |

=== 1995 ===
1995 Saskatchewan general election
| Party | Candidate | Votes | % | ±% |
|---|---|---|---|---|
| New Democratic | Eldon Lautermilch | 2,946 | 58.75 | -9.29 |
| Liberal | Phil West | 1,293 | 25.78 | +6.28 |
| Progressive Conservative | John Fryters | 776 | 15.47 | +3.01 |
| Total | | 5,015 | 100.00 | |
| New Democratic hold | | Swing | | - |

=== 1991 ===
1991 Saskatchewan general election
| Party | Candidate | Votes | % | ±% |
|---|---|---|---|---|
| New Democratic | Eldon Lautermilch | 5,405 | 68.04 | * |
| Liberal | Hannah Shenouda | 1,549 | 19.50 | * |
| Progressive Conservative | Terry Wiebe | 990 | 12.46 | * |
| Total | | 7,944 | 100.00 | |
| New Democratic pickup new district. | | | | |

== See also ==
- List of Saskatchewan provincial electoral districts
- List of Saskatchewan general elections
- Canadian provincial electoral districts
