= Paul Schoenhals =

Canadian politician

The Honourable Paul Schoenhals ECS

MLA for Saskatoon Sutherland
- In office 1982–1986
- Preceded by: Peter Prebble
- Succeeded by: Mark Koenker

Personal details
- Born: November 5, 1941 (age 84) Clinton, Ontario, Canada
- Party: Progressive Conservative
- Spouse: Dorenda Schoenhals (m. 1969; div. before 1991)
- Occupation: Educator

Paul John Schoenhals (born November 5, 1941) is a Canadian former provincial politician. He was a Progressive Conservative member of the Legislative Assembly of Saskatchewan from 1982 to 1986, representing the electoral district of Saskatoon Sutherland.

He was born in Clinton, Ontario, the son of Stewart John Schoenhals and Phyllis Lillian Elliott, and was educated in Ontario, at Nutana Collegiate in Saskatoon and at the University of Saskatchewan, where he received a BEd. Schoenhals taught high school and was director and head coach for the Saskatoon Hilltops Canadian minor football club. In 1969, he married future Canadian champion curler Dorenda Stirton.

He served in the provincial cabinet as Minister of Urban Affairs, as Minister of Culture and Youth, as Minister of Culture and Recreation, as Minister of Telephones, as Minister of Science and Technology, as Minister of Supply and Services and as Minister of Tourism and Small Business. Schoenhals was defeated by Mark Koenker when he ran for reelection to the Saskatchewan assembly in 1986.

After leaving politics, he became president of Petroleum Industry Training Service. Schoenhals later moved to Calgary, Alberta, where he was President and Chief Executive Officer of Enform.
