= Craik Sustainable Living Project =

Nonprofit organization in Saskatchewan, Canada

Coordinates: 51°03′36″N 105°48′09″W

CSLP logo

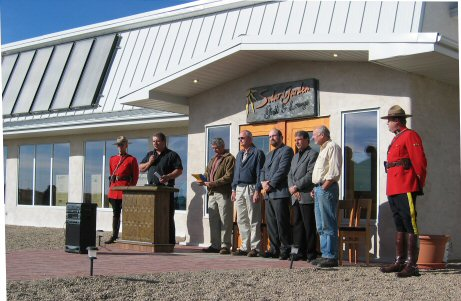
Craik Eco-Centre entrance during the Grand Opening ceremony

The Craik Sustainable Living Project (CSLP) is a nonprofit organization for sustainable development that aims to advance the local use of more ecologically sound technologies and ways of living in rural Saskatchewan, Canada. The four key components of the project are the eco-centre, outreach and education programs, community action, and the ecovillage.

== History ==
CSLP was created in 2001 from a partnership between the RM of Craik No. 222 and the town of Craik to develop a long-term plan for a sustainable community-based project. At the request of area resident Peter Farden of the Midlakes Community Coalition, Lynn Oliphant proposed a plan for the development of Saskatchewan's first ecovillage, which was adopted by community leaders. Four main areas of development were established to relate to sustainability.

== Key activities ==
=== Eco-centre ===
The Eco-centre was a multipurpose facility that was built and designed as a focal point for the project. Completed in 2004 under the direction of designer and project manager Cory Gordon, the 6,000 sq ft (560 m^{2}). straw bale and timber frame structure features innovative and energy efficient building design and integrated heating, cooling and renewable energy systems. Local and recycled materials were incorporated whenever possible. The philosophy behind this type of construction is known as green building. Facilities included a restaurant, golf clubhouse, gift shop and three meeting rooms. The Eco-centre was destroyed by fire on March 24, 2016.

=== Outreach and education ===
CSLP supports Education for Sustainable Development, and is working to provide educational opportunities for children, youth and adults on climate change, renewable energy technologies, ecology, sustainable living, and sustainable agriculture. The main projects involved have been the Sustainable Rural Alternatives Seminar Series, the creation of a resource library, and the Climate Change Awareness and Action Pilot Project in the Davidson School Division (which is now part of the Sun West School Division). CSLP representatives have been invited to trade fairs, enviro-forums, eco-fairs and other functions to highlight their work. Promotion of the project has also been advanced through the website, brochures, and articles written for local newspapers and other publications like the Regina EcoLiving Guide.

CSLP has also supported the participation of students in the Youth Forum on Sustainability Program, which has resulted in youth helping to organize a number of workshops for students from Grades K-12 including papermaking, vermicomposting and endangered species. Presenters of these workshops included experts from the University of Saskatchewan, the University of Regina, and HELP International.

=== Community action ===
The Craik Sustainable Living Project strives to motivate local people to reduce their ecological footprint. In addition to education initiatives, CSLP seeks funding and resources to support activities that increases energy efficiency of homes and vehicle use, reduce greenhouse gas emissions and introduce less contaminants into the environment. An example initiative is the no-idling policy in front of the town and municipal administration buildings.

=== Ecovillage ===
An access road to a 127-acre (0.51 km^{2}) parcel of land was the first visible indication of the development of the ecovillage site in the fall of 2005. The first residents are planning to submit plans and begin construction in the following year. The mayor of the town of Craik at the time, Rod Haugerud, was the first to obtain a lot and begin construction of a straw bale home, but the lot has since been made available to Praxis International Institute. All of the original lots offered have been spoken for, with a second phase underway. Applications are to include plans for energy efficient housing and systems to be built on-site within a year of submission. Future direction for community planning will come from the residents themselves.

== Awards and recognition ==
- February 17, 2005 — One Tonne Challenge Proposal accepted for the Craik Community-Mid-Lakes area
- May 6, 2005 — FCM-CH2M HILL Sustainable Community Award for Community Engagement
- June 12, 2005 — Canadian Geographic Canadian Environment Award to Lynn Oliphant
- April 6, 2006 — Tourism Saskatchewan's Land of Living Skies Award of Excellence
- 2008-2012 — UN RCE Saskatchewan Recognition Awards for various initiatives
