= Victoria Jurgens =

Canadian politician

Member of the Saskatchewan Legislative Assembly for Prince Albert Northcote
- In office November 7, 2011 – March 8, 2016
- Preceded by: Darcy Furber
- Succeeded by: Nicole Rancourt

Personal details
- Party: Saskatchewan Party

Victoria Jurgens is a Canadian politician, who served as the Member of the Legislative Assembly of Saskatchewan for the riding of Prince Albert Northcote from 2011 to 2016. She was elected in the 2011 election as a member of the Saskatchewan Party caucus. She was defeated in the 2016 election, by NDP candidate Nicole Rancourt.

== Electoral history ==
=== 2011 Saskatchewan general election ===
2011 Saskatchewan general election: Prince Albert Northcote
Party	Candidate	Votes	%	±%
Saskatchewan	Victoria Jurgens	2,816	50.23	+15.82
New Democratic	Darcy Furber	2,625	46.83	-6.50
Green	Raymond Bandet	165	2.94	+0.60
Total		5,606	100.00	
Saskatchewan gain from New Democratic		Swing		-

=== 2016 Saskatchewan general election ===
2016 Saskatchewan general election: Prince Albert Northcote
Party	Candidate	Votes	%	±%
New Democratic	Nicole Rancourt	2,752	49.12	+2.29
Saskatchewan	Victoria Jurgens	2,491	44.46	-5.77
Liberal	Jonathan Fraser	272	4.85	–
Green	Trace Yellowtail	88	1.57	-1.37
Total valid votes		5,603	100.0	
Eligible voters		–		
New Democratic gain from Saskatchewan		Swing		-
Source: Elections Saskatchewan
