= Nicole Rancourt =

Canadian politician

Member of the Saskatchewan Legislative Assembly for Prince Albert Northcote
- In office April 4, 2016 – September 29, 2020
- Preceded by: Victoria Jurgens
- Succeeded by: Alana Ross

Personal details
- Party: Saskatchewan New Democratic Party

Nicole Rancourt is a Canadian politician who served in the Legislative Assembly of Saskatchewan from 2016 to 2020, representing the riding of Prince Albert Northcote. She was elected in the 2016 provincial election as a member of the Saskatchewan New Democratic Party. She defeated Saskatchewan Party incumbent Victoria Jurgens with a majority of 261 votes. In the 2020 Saskatchewan general election, she was unseated by Alana Ross.

In 2008, Rancourt was awarded the Rebel With A Cause award from the Elizabeth Fry Society for her work with incarcerated women. In 2023, she was named to the Women's Hall of Fame by the Prince Albert Council of Women. She is running for her old seat in the 2024 Saskatchewan general election.

Rancourt has a Business Administration Certificate from Saskatchewan Polytechnic and a Bachelor Degree in Social Work from the University of Regina. Before entering politics, Nicole was a registered Social Worker and worked at Prince Albert Mental Health Outpatient for the Prince Albert Parkland Health Region.

Rancourt endorsed Alberta MP Heather McPherson in the 2026 New Democratic Party leadership election.

== Electoral history ==
=== 2016 Saskatchewan general election ===
2016 Saskatchewan general election: Prince Albert Northcote
Party	Candidate	Votes	%	±%
New Democratic	Nicole Rancourt	2,697	–	–
Saskatchewan	Victoria Jurgens	2,465	–	–
Liberal	Jonathan Fraser	266	–	–
Green	Trace Yellowtail	88	–	–
Total valid votes		–	100.0	
Eligible voters		–		
New Democratic gain from Saskatchewan		Swing		-
Source: Elections Saskatchewan
