= Duane Weiman =

Canadian politician

Duane Raymond William Edward Weiman (February 22, 1946 – September 4, 2015) was an educator and political figure in Saskatchewan, Canada. He represented Saskatoon Fairview from 1982 to 1986 in the Legislative Assembly of Saskatchewan as a Progressive Conservative.

Weiman was born in Bruno, Saskatchewan in 1946, the son of Raymond Weiman and Lauraine Hazelwanter, and was educated at the Saskatoon Technical Collegiate Institute and the University of Saskatchewan. In 1968, he married Delores Ann Hanowski.
