= Andy Iwanchuk =

Canadian politician

Member of the Saskatchewan Legislative Assembly for Saskatoon Fairview
- In office March 17, 2003 – October 10, 2011
- Preceded by: Chris Axworthy
- Succeeded by: Jennifer Campeau

Personal details
- Party: New Democratic Party

Andy Iwanchuk is a Canadian provincial politician. He was the Saskatchewan New Democratic Party member of the Legislative Assembly of Saskatchewan for the constituency of Saskatoon Fairview.

== Biography ==
Iwanchuk grew up on a farm and later attended high school in North Battleford. He earned a Bachelor of Arts Advance Degree in Political Science and Sociology from the University of Saskatchewan. He worked for the United Way of Saskatoon, Saskatchewan Legal Aid Commission and the Canadian Union of Public Employees.

Iwanchuk was first elected to the Legislative Assembly in March 2003 in a by-election, after the former MLA Chris Axworthy resigned. He was re-elected in the general election in November later that same year and then again in November 2007. While in office, he was the Opposition whip and serves as the critic responsible for labour. He lost his seat in the 2011 provincial election to the Saskatchewan Party candidate, Jennifer Campeau.

Iwanchuk's wife, Ann, was elected into Saskatoon City Council in a by-election on October 19, 2011.
