= Graham Addley =

Canadian politician

MLA for Saskatoon Sutherland
- In office September 16, 1999 – November 20, 2007
- Preceded by: Mark Koenker
- Succeeded by: Joceline Schriemer

Personal details
- Born: 1963 (age 62–63) Loon Lake
- Party: New Democratic Party

Graham Addley (born 1963) is a Canadian provincial politician. He was the New Democratic Party member of the Legislative Assembly of Saskatchewan for the constituency of Saskatoon Sutherland until he was defeated in the 2007 election by the Saskatchewan Party's Joceline Schriemer.
