= Joan Pratchler =

Canadian politician

Member of the Saskatchewan Legislative Assembly for Regina Rochdale
- Incumbent
- Assumed office October 28, 2024
- Preceded by: new riding

Shadow Minister for Childcare and Early Learning
- Incumbent
- Assumed office November 13, 2024
- Preceded by: Meara Conway

Personal details
- Party: Saskatchewan NDP
- Education: University of Saskatchewan (B.Ed.); St. Thomas More College (BA); University of Regina Saskatchewan Polytechnic

Joan Pratchler is a Canadian politician, registered nurse, registered teacher and former educator who was elected to the Legislative Assembly of Saskatchewan in the 2024 general election, representing Regina Rochdale as a member of the New Democratic Party.

== Life and career ==
Pratchler has a Bachelor of Education and Bachelor of Arts in French and music from the University of Saskatchewan and St. Thomas More College. She later received a postgraduate diploma in Education Admin and Masters of Education (Admin) from the University of Regina Her thesis "Exploring the Subjectivity of Lay Catholic Administrators in Catholic Schools: A Qualitative Studgy https://hdl.handle.net/10294/12609 was nominated for the GG Gold Medal for outstanding research in Masters or PhD program. In 2015, Pratchler retired as a principal. By 2019 she completed a nursing degree in the Saskatchewan Collaborative Bachelor of Science program in Nursing (SCBScN) Saskatchewan Polytech and University of Regina.
