= Darcy Furber =

Canadian politician

Member of the Saskatchewan Legislative Assembly for Prince Albert Northcote
- In office November 21, 2007 – October 10, 2011
- Preceded by: Eldon Lautermilch
- Succeeded by: Victoria Jurgens

Personal details
- Born: 1972 (age 53–54)
- Party: New Democrat

Darcy Furber (born 1972) is a Canadian politician who was elected to represent the electoral district of Prince Albert Northcote in the Legislative Assembly of Saskatchewan in the 2007 election. He is a member of the New Democratic Party.
