= Darryl Hickie =

Canadian politician

The Honourable Darryl Hickie ECS

Member of the Saskatchewan Legislative Assembly for Prince Albert Carlton
- In office November 7, 2007 – March 9, 2015
- Preceded by: Myron Kowalsky
- Succeeded by: Joe Hargrave

Personal details
- Born: 1963 or 1964 (age 61–62) Winnipeg, Manitoba, Canada
- Party: Saskatchewan Party

Darryl Hickie (born c. 1964) is a Canadian politician. He was elected to represent the electoral district of Prince Albert Carlton in the Legislative Assembly of Saskatchewan in the 2007 election. He is a member of the Saskatchewan Party.

Hickie was born in Winnipeg into a military family, and moved to Prince Albert in 1975. He worked as a correctional officer and parole officer at the Saskatchewan Federal Penitentiary, and later as a police officer for the Prince Albert Police Service.

He was appointed to the Executive Council of Saskatchewan as Minister of Corrections, Public Safety and Policing in Brad Wall's government in November 2007. He was later ousted by premier Brad Wall. He went back to policing in Prince Albert, however he was terminated from his position for insubordination.

In 2020, he ran for mayor of Prince Albert, but finished second to incumbent mayor, Greg Dionne. After his loss, he made a profile on Facebook under the name Ed Whalen.
