= Eldon Lautermilch =

Canadian politician (1949–2026)

The Honourable Eldon Lautermilch ECS

MLA for Prince Albert Duck Lake
- In office 1986–1991
- Succeeded by: riding dissolved

MLA for Prince Albert Northcote
- In office 1991 – November 20, 2007
- Preceded by: first member
- Succeeded by: Darcy Furber

Personal details
- Born: September 9, 1949 Lafleche, Saskatchewan, Canada
- Died: February 9, 2026 (aged 76) Regina, Saskatchewan, Canada
- Party: New Democratic Party

Eldon Floyd Lautermilch (September 9, 1949 – February 9, 2026) was a Canadian provincial politician. He was the Saskatchewan New Democratic Party member of the Legislative Assembly of Saskatchewan for the constituency of Prince Albert Northcote.

== Life and career ==
Lautermilch was first elected in 1986 and was re-elected in subsequent elections in 1991, 1995, 1999 and 2003.

He was appointed to the cabinet in 1992, and held several portfolios including Energy and Mines, Rural Development, Economic and Co-operative Development, Minister of Intergovernmental Affairs, Minister of Aboriginal Affairs, Forestry, Minister of Highways and Transportation, and Government House Leader.

Lautermilch won the 2003 election by more than 1600 votes.

He did not run in the 2007 election.

Lautermilch died of complications from amyotrophic lateral sclerosis (ALS) on February 9, 2026, at the age of 76.
