= Mark Wartman =

Canadian politician

The Honourable Mark Wartman ECS

MLA for Regina Qu'Appelle Valley
- In office 1999 – November 20, 2007
- Preceded by: Suzanne Murray
- Succeeded by: Laura Ross

Personal details
- Born: August 20, 1951 (age 74) Saskatoon, Saskatchewan
- Party: New Democrat

Mark Wartman (born August 20, 1951) is a Canadian provincial politician. He was the Saskatchewan New Democratic Party member of the Legislative Assembly of Saskatchewan for the constituency of Regina Qu'Appelle Valley from 1999 to 2007. He served as Agriculture Minister for Saskatchewan.

He currently works as a private fundraising consultant and serves on the non-profit board of directors for carmichael outreach in Regina, Saskatchewan.
