= Myron Kowalsky =

Canadian politician (1941–2022)

Member of the Legislative Assembly of Saskatchewan for Prince Albert Carlton Prince Albert (1986-1991)
- In office October 20, 1986 – November 20, 2007
- Preceded by: John Paul Meagher
- Succeeded by: Darryl Hickie

23rd Speaker of the Legislative Assembly of Saskatchewan
- In office March 20, 2001 – December 10, 2007
- Preceded by: Ron Osika
- Succeeded by: Don Toth

Personal details
- Born: July 11, 1941 North Battleford, Saskatchewan, Canada
- Died: June 8, 2022 (aged 80) Prince Albert, Saskatchewan, Canada
- Party: New Democratic Party
- Occupation: Teacher

Peter Myron Kowalsky (July 11, 1941 – June 8, 2022) was a Canadian politician, teacher, and Speaker of the Legislative Assembly of Saskatchewan.

== Biography ==
Born in North Battleford, Saskatchewan in 1941, he attended high school in North Battleford and Saskatoon. He obtained a B.A., B. Ed. with Distinction, and a Post Graduate Diploma in Curriculum Studies from the University of Saskatchewan. Kowalsky began his teaching career in 1961. He taught at Quill Lake School, Unity Composite School, Riverside Collegiate, and Carlton Comprehensive High School in Prince Albert.

Kowalsky spent time in Gambia on Project Overseas. Throughout his career, he stayed involved in farming, teaching, home construction, and was a crop hail adjuster. Kowalsky was keenly interested and an advocate for the arts, with a special interest in drama and dance. He was a member of the Holy Trinity Ukrainian Orthodox Church in Prince Albert. Kowalsky was married to the former Olesia Kindrachuk and has two daughters and two grandchildren.

Kowalsky was first elected to the Legislative Assembly of Saskatchewan in 1986. He was re-elected again in 1991, 1995, 1999, and 2003. He has served as Government Whip and on various committees. He most recently chaired the Special Committee on Tobacco Control.

On March 20, 2001, Kowalsky was elected as Speaker of the Legislative Assembly of Saskatchewan and re-elected as Speaker in 2004. He was the Chair of the Standing Committees on House Services and Privilege and chaired the Board of Internal Economy of the Legislative Assembly. He also hosted the Midwest Legislative Conference which was held in Regina in July 2005.

Kowalsky has served on the executive committee of the CPA. He chaired the Saskatchewan Branch of the CPA, and served on the executive committee of the CSG-Midwest.

In December 2004, Kowalsky participated as an election observer in the Presidential Election in Ukraine. Stationed in Chernivtsi, he helped oversee the process in order to ensure a fair election. He died at his home in Saskatoon on June 8, 2022, at the age of 80.
