= Alana Ross =

Canadian politician

The Honourable Alana Ross ECS MLA

Member of the Saskatchewan Legislative Assembly for Prince Albert Northcote
- Incumbent
- Assumed office October 26, 2020
- Preceded by: Nicole Rancourt

Personal details
- Born: July 12, 1957 (age 68) Shellbrook, Saskatchewan
- Party: Saskatchewan Party

Alana Ross is a Canadian politician, who was first elected to the Legislative Assembly of Saskatchewan in the 2020 Saskatchewan general election and re-elected in the 2024 Saskatchewan general election. She represents the electoral district of Prince Albert Northcote as a member of the Saskatchewan Party.

Ross is currently the Minister of Parks, Culture and Sport, Minister responsible for the Status of Women, Minister responsible for SLGA, and Minister responsible for Tourism Saskatchewan.

Ross has held a number of positions as MLA including Legislative Secretary for the Forestry Sector, Deputy Government Whip for House Leadership, and serves on the Treasury Board, Economy committee, Board of Internal Economy, caucus Management Committee, Premier's Commendation Award Committee, House Committee on Private Bills as chair, House Committee on Privileges, and House Services Committee.

Ross grew up in the Prince Alberta area before studying nursing at the University of Alberta. She worked as a nurse for over 30 years and also served as a unit union representative and post-secondary instructor. Ross has volunteered in the local 4-H program, the PA Exhibition Board, and the PA Rural School Division Board.
