= Joceline Schriemer =

Canadian politician

Member of the Saskatchewan Legislative Assembly for Saskatoon Sutherland
- In office November 21, 2007 – October 10, 2011
- Preceded by: Graham Addley
- Succeeded by: Paul Merriman

Personal details
- Born: Joceline Sylvia Prefontaine; September 15, 1960 Regina, Saskatchewan, Canada
- Died: November 29, 2022 (aged 62) Saskatoon, Saskatchewan, Canada
- Party: Saskatchewan Party
- Children: 2
- Occupation: Police officer, EMT

Joceline Sylvia Prefontaine (formerly Schriemer; September 15, 1960 – November 29, 2022) was a Canadian politician. She was elected to represent the electoral district of Saskatoon Sutherland in the Legislative Assembly of Saskatchewan in the 2007 election. She is a member of the Saskatchewan Party.

Schriemer was born in Regina and raised in Montmartre, Saskatchewan. Prior to being elected to office, she worked as an emergency medical technician and a police officer with the Saskatoon Police Service.

In June 2010, Schriemer announced that she would not seek re-election in the 2011 general election in order to seek a return to policing. She died at a hospital in Saskatoon, Saskatchewan on November 29, 2022.
