= Regina South Albert =

Provincial electoral district in Saskatchewan, Canada

Saskatchewan electoral district

Provincial electoral district
- Legislature: Legislative Assembly of Saskatchewan
MLA
Aleana Young
New Democratic
- District created: 2022
- First contested: 2024
- Last contested: 2024
- Communities: Regina

Regina South Albert is a provincial electoral district for the Legislative Assembly of Saskatchewan, Canada. It was created out of Regina University, Regina Pasqua and small part of Lumsden-Morse.

== History ==
It was first contested at the 2024 Saskatchewan general election.

Along with the city of Regina, the riding includes the community of City View Estate in the Rural Municipality of Sherwood No. 159, located just south of Regina's municipal boundaries.

== Members of the Legislative Assembly ==
Legislature	Years	Member	Party
Regina University, Regina Pasqua, Lumsden Morse
30th	2024-present	Aleana Young	New Democrat

== Election results ==
=== 2024 ===
2024 Saskatchewan general election
Party	Candidate	Votes	%	±%
New Democratic	Aleana Young	4,562	64.0	+15.3
Saskatchewan	Khushdil (Lucky) Mehrok	2,130	29.9	-14.9
Progressive Conservative	David Teece	306	4.3	
Green	Leonie Williams	126	1.8	-1.8
Total valid votes		7,124		
Total rejected ballots				
Turnout				
Eligible voters		–		
Source: Elections Saskatchewan
New Democratic hold		Swing		Saskatchewan

2020 provincial election redistributed results
Party	%
New Democratic	48.7
Saskatchewan	44.8
Green	3.6
Buffalo	0.1
