= Dave McGrane =

Canadian politician

David Patrick McGrane (born October 22, 1977) is a Canadian professor, political scientist and community activist living in Saskatoon, Saskatchewan.

== Early life and background ==
Born in Moose Jaw, Saskatchewan, McGrane attended Campion College, University of Regina, where he completed a BA in Political Science with High Honours (1999). Subsequently, he obtained an MA in Political Science from York University (2000) and a PhD in Political Science from Carleton University (2007).

== Academic career ==
McGrane moved to Saskatoon when he was appointed assistant professor of political studies at St. Thomas More College, University of Saskatchewan in 2007. He was appointed associate professor in 2012 and full professor in 2020. His research interests are primarily in the areas of Canadian public policy, elections, and political parties.

McGrane has authored and co-authored almost forty academic books and articles. In 2014 he published a book, Remaining Loyal: Social Democracy in Quebec and Saskatchewan, which compares public policies in the two Canadian provinces and details changes over time. The book was shortlisted by the Saskatchewan Book Awards in the category of scholarly writing.

New NDP: Moderation, Modernization, and Political Marketing, a book on the federal NDP, has been praised for its analysis and thoroughness. It was released in 2019. In 2020, it won the Donald Smiley Prize awarded by the Canadian Political Science Association to the best book written on politics and government in Canada.

Along with Roy Romanow, McGrane was lead editor for the 2019 book Back to Blakeney: Revitalizing the Democratic State, which came together as a result a 2015 gathering of academics at the University of Saskatchewan to discuss former Saskatchewan NDP Premier Allan Blakeney's political legacy. David Moscrop wrote in the Globe & Mail that the book is “interesting as an historical assessment of an effectual Premier, but it’s particularly attractive as a reminder that Big Politics is a province-building (or nation-building) necessity.” The collection won Saskatchewan Book Award for best scholarly work (the Jennifer Welsh Prize) in 2020.

An academic and public intellectual, McGrane has been invited to speak many times on policy issues in the Canadian media.

== Community activism ==
McGrane has served on the governing board of the Saskatoon Open Door Society and has been a member of the Saskatoon Environmental Advisory Committee. In 2016, he was presented with the Labour Service Community Award from the Saskatoon & District Labour Council and United Way in recognition of his volunteer work.

Active politically before the 2016 Saskatchewan provincial election, McGrane was chosen in 2016 as the President of the Saskatchewan NDP at the party’s annual convention. At the convention, he criticized the governing Saskatchewan Party for budget cuts to social programs, inaction on combating climate change, and giving consideration to the privatization of SaskTel, a provincial crown agency.

On June 1, 2019, Dave McGrane was nominated as the Saskatchewan NDP candidate for Saskatoon Churchill-Wildwood in the upcoming provincial election. The NDP had lost this riding by 12% to the Saskatchewan Party in the previous election, which was the equivalent of 934 votes. In the 2020 provincial election, with McGrane as its candidate, the NDP came much closer to winning Saskatoon Churchill-Wildwood than in the preceding election, losing by 3% to Saskatchewan Party incumbent MLA Lisa Lambert, a difference of only 259 votes.
