= Danielle Chartier =

Canadian politician

Member of the Saskatchewan Legislative Assembly for Saskatoon Riversdale
- In office September 21, 2009 – October 26, 2020
- Preceded by: Lorne Calvert
- Succeeded by: Marv Friesen

Personal details
- Born: Saskatoon, Saskatchewan, Canada
- Party: New Democratic Party
- Children: 2
- Education: University of Regina
- Profession: Journalist, Social Worker

Danielle Chartier is a former Canadian politician. She was elected to the Legislative Assembly of Saskatchewan in a by-election on September 21, 2009, representing the electoral district of Saskatoon Riversdale as a member of the Saskatchewan New Democratic Party. She was reelected in the 2011 and 2016 provincial elections. Chartier did not seek re-election in the 2020 provincial election.

== Early life and education ==
Chartier is a third-generation resident of the Saskatoon Riversdale constituency.

After obtaining a bachelor of social work degree from the University of Regina, Chartier worked for the Saskatchewan Department of Labour's Work and Family Unit for nearly three years.

== Career ==
Chartier has worked on projects for a number of community organizations, including the Saskatchewan Association for Community Living, Catholic Family Services of Saskatoon and the Children's Discovery Museum on the Saskatchewan.

Originally trained as a journalist, she has worked as a reporter for daily newspapers in Moose Jaw and Saskatoon, as well as weekly newspapers and monthly magazines.
