= Kim Breckner =

Canadian politician

Kim Breckner MLA

Member of the Legislative Assembly of Saskatchewan for Saskatoon Riversdale
- Incumbent
- Assumed office October 28, 2024
- Preceded by: Marv Friesen

Personal details
- Party: Saskatchewan NDP
- Education: University of Saskatchewan

Kimberley Breckner is a Canadian politician who was elected to the Legislative Assembly of Saskatchewan in the 2024 general election, representing Saskatoon Riversdale as a member of the New Democratic Party.

== Career ==
Before entering politics, Breckner worked as a lawyer. In the 2024 Saskatchewan provincial election, she was the Saskatchewan New Democratic Party's candidate in the riding of Saskatoon Riversdale. The riding had been a traditionally NDP stronghold, and had previously been represented by Saskatchewan Premiers Roy Romanow and Lorne Calvert. However in the 2020 provincial election the riding had been won by Marv Friesen of the Saskatchewan Party. Friesen did not stand for re-election in 2024 citing health problems. Breckner faced Saskatchewan Party candidate and economist Olugbenga Fakoyejo as well as Green Party of Saskatchewan leader Naomi Hunter. On election day, Breckner received 60.43% of the vote and was elected.

Since 2024, Breckner has served as the opposition Shadow Minister for Trade and Export Development. In this role, she has been active regarding Saskatchewan's response to the 2025 United States trade war with Canada. During the trade war, she advocated for a stronger response to American tariffs, criticizing the Saskatchewan Party government's response as slow and weak. She supported a renewed ban on the purchase of American-produced alcohol by the Saskatchewan Liquor and Gaming Authority. Such a ban had previously been implemented by the Saskatchewan Party government in March 2025, but had been rescinded just three months later. Breckner has also advocated for increased infrastructure investment in order to protect the Canadian economy from American tariffs. She has also been an opponent of Western Canadian separatism.

== Electoral record ==
2024 Saskatchewan general election: Saskatoon Riversdale
Party	Candidate	Votes	%	±%
New Democratic	Kim Breckner	3,624	60.43	+12.58
Saskatchewan	Olu Fakoyejo	2,118	35.32	–13.86
Green	Naomi Hunter	255	4.25	+1.28
Total valid votes		5,997	98.49	–0.71
Total rejected ballots		92	1.51	+0.71
Turnout		6,089		
Eligible voters		–		
Source: Elections Saskatchewan
New Democratic gain from Saskatchewan		Swing		–
