= Warren McCall =

Canadian politician

The Honourable Warren McCall ECS

Member of the Saskatchewan Legislative Assembly for Regina Elphinstone-Centre Regina Elphinstone (2001-2003)
- In office February 21, 2001 – September 29, 2020
- Preceded by: Dwain Lingenfelter
- Succeeded by: Meara Conway

Personal details
- Born: October 28, 1972 (age 53) Regina, Saskatchewan
- Party: New Democratic Party

Warren McCall is a former Member of the Legislative Assembly of Saskatchewan. A member of the Saskatchewan New Democratic Party, he was first elected in a February 2001 by-election and has been re-elected to the Legislative Assembly for Regina Elphinstone-Centre in the 2003, 2007, 2011 and 2016 general elections. He was the Opposition House Leader and the official opposition critic for Advanced Education, SaskTel, Central Services, the Lean Initiative, Saskatchewan Gaming Corporation, and the Provincial Capital Commission. McCall did not seek re-election in the 2020 Saskatchewan general election.

In the Lorne Calvert NDP Government, McCall served in a variety of roles. Most notable were appointments as Minister of Advanced Education & Employment, and as Minister of Corrections & Public Safety. He chaired a Review of Accessibility & Affordability of Post-Secondary Education in Saskatchewan. He also served as Deputy Whip, Deputy Caucus Chair, Chair of the Crown Corporations Committee, Chair of the Standing Committee on the Economy, in addition to membership on several committees of the Assembly.

McCall holds a Bachelor of Arts in Canadian History from the University of Regina. From 1997 to 2001, he worked for New Democratic Party Member of Parliament Lorne Nystrom in Ottawa and Regina.
