= Sally Housser =

Canadian politician

Member of the Saskatchewan Legislative Assembly for Regina University
- Incumbent
- Assumed office October 28, 2024
- Preceded by: Aleana Young

Shadow Minister of Energy and Resources, SaskEnergy
- Incumbent
- Assumed office November 13, 2024
- Preceded by: Aleana Young

Personal details
- Party: Saskatchewan NDP

Sally Housser is a Canadian politician who was elected to the Legislative Assembly of Saskatchewan in the 2024 general election, representing Regina University as a member of the New Democratic Party.

== Electoral record ==
2024 Saskatchewan general election: Regina University
Party	Candidate	Votes	%	±%
New Democratic	Sally Housser	4,081	52.20	+12.2
Saskatchewan	Gene Makowsky	3,426	43.82	-11.78
Progressive Conservative	Corie Rempel	233	2.98	+0.62
Green	Cedar Park	78	1.00	-1.1
Total valid votes		7,818	99.75	
Total rejected ballots		59	0.25	-0.58
Turnout		7,877	66.83	+4.05
Eligible voters		11,786		
Source: Elections Saskatchewan
New Democratic gain		Swing		
