= Meara Conway =

Canadian politician

Meara Conway MLA
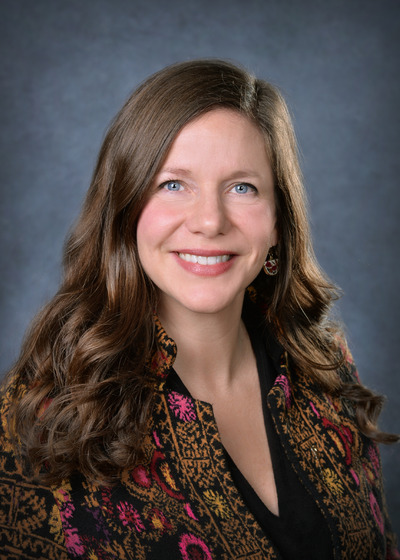

Shadow Minister for Health
- Incumbent
- Assumed office June 3, 2025
- Leader: Carla Beck

Shadow Minister of Rural and Remote Health. Ethics and Democracy
- In office November 13, 2024 – June 3, 2025
- Leader: Carla Beck

Deputy House Leader of the Saskatchewan New Democratic Party
- Incumbent
- Assumed office October 5, 2022
- Leader: Carla Beck

Critic, Social Services; Housing; Human Rights; and Community-Based Organizations
- In office November 4, 2020 – November 13, 2024
- Leader: Ryan Meili and Carla Beck

Member of the Saskatchewan Legislative Assembly for Regina Elphinstone-Centre
- Incumbent
- Assumed office October 26, 2020
- Preceded by: Warren McCall

Personal details
- Party: Saskatchewan New Democratic Party
- Education: McGill University
- Occupation: lawyer
- Website: https://mearaconway.ca/

Meara Conway (Meer-a); is a Canadian politician, who was elected to the Legislative Assembly of Saskatchewan in the 2020 Saskatchewan general election. She represents the electoral district of Regina Elphinstone-Centre as a member of the Saskatchewan New Democratic Party.

== Political career ==
Meara Conway, a former lawyer, has been a prominent critic of the Saskatchewan Party government on issues relating to government spending, procurement, conflicts of interest, and political accountability. During her time in opposition, Conway has raised concerns in the Saskatchewan Legislative Assembly and through formal complaints regarding the use of public funds and potential conflicts of interest involving government officials and private businesses.

One of the most significant matters pursued by Conway involved Saskatchewan Party MLA Gary Grewal and government social services payments to motel properties in which he held an ownership interest. Conway filed a successful complaint with Saskatchewan’s Conflict of Interest Commissioner. A 2024 investigation concluded that Grewal had contravened provisions of The Members’ Conflict of Interest Act. Conway began pursuing the matter after assisting a senior who had been evicted from a government-owned building and subsequently placed in a hotel. She alleged that the senior was charged an inflated room rate by the hotel after Saskatchewan's Ministry of Social Services began covering the cost of the accommodation. Conway's scrutiny of the case subsequently drew attention to the hotel's ownership and its financial relationship with the provincial government. The controversy received substantial public and media attention and became part of a broader debate over government procurement, social-services spending, housing policy, and conflict-of-interest safeguards in Saskatchewan.

Conway also filed a successful conflict-of-interest complaint against Saskatchewan Party MLA and cabinet minister Jeremy Cockrill. In 2024, Saskatchewan's Conflict of Interest Commissioner found that Cockrill had contravened The Members’ Conflict of Interest Act by participating in government contracts while holding a beneficial interest in a family-owned windows and doors business.

Her work in opposition has consequently focused in significant part on government ethics, using legislative questioning, access-to-information records, public advocacy, and formal complaints to bring greater scrutiny to the Saskatchewan Party government.

During the 2020 Saskatchewan election Conway came under fire from the Saskatchewan Party over social media comments made in 2018 that implied an opposition to the Alberta oil sands. Party leader Ryan Meili subsequently addressed the comments and affirmed NDP support for oil and gas, while recognizing the need to invest in renewables sources of energy. Conway reiterated that she is "very concerned about the impacts of climate change" and applauded the NDP's approach, which she said includes "investments into renewable energy that would create sustainable, well-paying jobs for energy sector workers."

Conway has served as NDP critic for Health, Social Services, Housing, Human Rights, Community-Based Organizations, Rural and Remote Health, Childcare and Early Learning, Francophone Affairs, Ethics and Democracy, Associate Education, and as Deputy House Leader for the Opposition.

While serving as critic for Social Services, Housing, and Community-based Organizations, Conway led consultations across Saskatchewan and released a comprehensive report on housing, poverty, and social assistance in early 2022. The report examined changes to housing policy, a pattern of cuts to services, and took aim at changes to the SIS program introduced by the Saskatchewan Party. The report proposed both short and longterm policy recommendations aimed at reducing homelessness and improving Saskatchewan’s social safety net.

As of June 2025, Conway was named the Health critic.

== Personal life ==
Conway lives in Regina with her three children and partner, a school teacher.

Prior to running for office, Conway was a public defender with Legal Aid Saskatchewan and was named one of Canadian Lawyer's 25 Most Influential Lawyers of 2019 for her public interest work. Before going into law, she was an award-winning musician and remains a strong advocate for the arts.

Conway has deep roots in Saskatchewan. Her grandparents were active on the frontline for the battle for medicare, and founding members of the Saskatoon Community Clinic. Her grandfather, Ed Mahood was born on a farm in Grenfell, Saskatchewan and worked for years as a rural teacher before becoming a professor of Educational Foundations at the University of Saskatchewan. He helped organize community clinics across the province and was the first chair of the Saskatoon Community Clinic Board, which pioneered “interdisciplinary community medicine” in Saskatchewan. He was known as one of the "peaceful generals in the grassroots struggle for Medicare."

Her grandmother, Dr. Margaret Mahood was born in Alameda, Saskatchewan and was among the first small group of women psychiatrists practicing in Canada. She was one of a few doctors who worked through the bitter Saskatchewan doctors' strike of 1962, resigning from her position at the North Battleford Hospital to join Dr. Joan Witney-Moore at the newly formed Saskatoon community clinic. Demand was great for services and the clinic was open until midnight in its first days. The strike was a significant test for Medicare and community clinics were key to undermining its effectiveness. The strike's failure allowed Medicare to continue and the Saskatchewan model was adopted throughout Canada within ten years.

Conway's mother, Dr. Sally Mahood, has practised family medicine in Regina for 40 years and is a longtime advocate for women's health. Conway's father, John Conway, is a retired sociology Professor at the University of Regina and served as a trustee for the Regina Public School Board undefeated for 18 years before he retired in 2009.

== Electoral record ==
2024 Saskatchewan general election: Regina Elphinstone-Centre
Party	Candidate	Votes	%	±%
New Democratic	Meara Conway	3,268	61.08	-0.33
Saskatchewan	Caesar Khan	1,417	26.49	-1.27
Saskatchewan United	Pamela Carpenter	310	5.79	–
Progress	Nathan Bruce	199	3.72	–
Green	Jim Elliott	156	2.92	-3.49
Total valid votes		5,350	99.42	
Total rejected ballots		31	0.58	-0.90
Turnout		5,381	38.06	+5.95
Eligible voters		14,138		
New Democratic hold		Swing		–
Source: Elections Saskatchewan

2020 Saskatchewan general election: Regina Elphinstone-Centre
Party	Candidate	Votes	%	±%
New Democratic	Meara Conway	2,491	61.41	+2.23
Saskatchewan	Caesar Khan	1,126	27.76	-2.43
Green	Naomi Hunter	260	6.41	+2.44
Progressive Conservative	Don Kirk	124	3.06	-
Independent	Rolf Hartloff	55	1.36	–
Total valid votes		4,056	98.52	
Total rejected ballots		61	1.48	+1.03
Turnout		4,117	32.11	-6.64
Eligible voters		12,820		
New Democratic hold		Swing		–
Source: Elections Saskatchewan
