= Saskatoon Riversdale =

Provincial electoral district in Saskatchewan, Canada

Saskatchewan electoral district
- Coordinates: 52.118°N 106.716°W

Provincial electoral district
- Legislature: Legislative Assembly of Saskatchewan
MLA
Kim Breckner
New Democratic
- District created: 1967
- First contested: 1967
- Last contested: 2024

Demographics
- Census division: Division No. 11
- Census subdivision: Saskatoon

Saskatoon Riversdale is a provincial electoral district for the Legislative Assembly of Saskatchewan, Canada. It was held by two Premiers of Saskatchewan from 1991 to 2007 — Roy Romanow and Lorne Calvert. It is currently represented by Kim Breckner of the Saskatchewan New Democratic Party.

The constituency was one of five created for the city of Saskatoon when the former multi-member constituency of Saskatoon City was abolished prior to the 1967 general election. Of those five ridings, Saskatoon Riversdale is the only one to have existed continuously without renaming.

It contains Riversdale, a subdivision of the Core Neighbourhoods Suburban Development Area in Saskatoon.

The riding has historically been an NDP stronghold, although it was won by the Saskatchewan Party in the 2020 provincial election. It had been in NDP hands for all but one term of its existence.

== Members of the Legislative Assembly ==
Legislature	Years	Member	Party
16th	1967–1971	Roy Romanow	New Democratic Party
17th	1971–1975	Roy Romanow	New Democratic Party
18th	1975–1978	Roy Romanow	New Democratic Party
19th	1978–1982	Roy Romanow	New Democratic Party
20th	1982–1986	Jo-Ann Zazelenchuk	Progressive Conservative
21st	1986–1991	Roy Romanow	New Democratic Party
22nd	1991–1995	Roy Romanow	New Democratic Party
23rd	1995–1999	Roy Romanow	New Democratic Party
24th	1999–2001	Roy Romanow	New Democratic Party
24th	2001–2003	Lorne Calvert	New Democratic Party
25th	2003–2007	Lorne Calvert	New Democratic Party
26th	2007–2009	Lorne Calvert	New Democratic Party
26th	2009–2011	Danielle Chartier	New Democratic Party
27th	2011–2016	Danielle Chartier	New Democratic Party
28th	2016–2020	Danielle Chartier	New Democratic Party
29th	2020–2024	Marv Friesen	Saskatchewan Party
30th	2024–present	Kim Breckner	New Democratic Party

== Election history ==
2024

2024 Saskatchewan general election
Party	Candidate	Votes	%	±%
New Democratic	Kim Breckner	3,624	60.43	+12.58
Saskatchewan	Olu Fakoyejo	2,118	35.32	–13.86
Green	Naomi Hunter	255	4.25	+1.28
Total valid votes		5,997	98.49	–0.71
Total rejected ballots		92	1.51	+0.71
Turnout		6,089		
Eligible voters		–		
Source: Elections Saskatchewan
New Democratic gain from Saskatchewan		Swing		–

2020 general election

2020 provincial election redistributed results
Party	%
Saskatchewan	48.6
New Democratic	48.3
Green	3.1

2020 Saskatchewan general election
Party	Candidate	Votes	%	±%
Saskatchewan	Marv Friesen	2,984	49.18	+5.63
New Democratic	Ashlee Hicks	2,903	47.85	-0.34
Green	Delanie Passer	180	2.97	+1.06
Total valid votes		6,067	99.20	
Total rejected ballots		49	0.80	+0.57
Turnout		6,116	46.08	-1.25
Eligible voters		13,272		
Saskatchewan gain from New Democratic		Swing		–
Source: Elections Saskatchewan

2016 general election

2016 Saskatchewan general election
Party	Candidate	Votes	%	±%
New Democratic	Danielle Chartier	2,691	48.19	-3.23
Saskatchewan	Marv Friesen	2,432	43.55	-2.16
Liberal	Robert Rudachyk	354	6.33	-
Green	Julia McKay	107	1.91	-0.95
Total valid votes		5,584	99.77	
Total rejected ballots		13	0.23	–
Turnout		5,597	47.33	–
Eligible voters		11,825		
New Democratic hold		Swing		–
Source: Elections Saskatchewan

2011 general election

2011 Saskatchewan general election
Party	Candidate	Votes	%	±%
New Democratic	Danielle Chartier	2,622	51.42	-1.60
Saskatchewan	Fred Ozirney	2,331	45.71	+3.52
Green	Vicki Strelioff	146	2.86	-0.82
Total			100	
New Democratic hold		Swing		–

2009 by-election

|

By-election, September 21, 2009 resignation of Lorne Calvert
Party	Candidate	Votes	%	±%
NDP	Danielle Chartier	2,154	53.02	-3.09
Saskatchewan	Corey O'Soup	1,714	42.19	+9.71
Liberal	Eileen Gelowitz	112	2.76	-5.30
Green	Tobi-Dawne Smith	83	2.04	+0.11

2007 general election

2007 Saskatchewan general election
Party	Candidate	Votes	%	±%
New Democratic	Lorne Calvert	3,524	56.11	–
Saskatchewan	Fred Ozirney	2,040	32.48	–
Liberal	Roman Todos	506	8.06	–
Green	Jan Norris	121	1.93	–
Marijuana	Michael Kereiff	89	1.42	–
Total		6,280	100	
New Democratic hold		Swing		–

== See also ==
- List of Saskatchewan provincial electoral districts
- List of Saskatchewan general elections
- Canadian provincial electoral districts
