= Regina Elphinstone-Centre =

Provincial electoral district in Saskatchewan, Canada

Saskatchewan electoral district
- Coordinates: 50.459°N 104.617°W

Provincial electoral district
- Legislature: Legislative Assembly of Saskatchewan
MLA
Meara Conway
New Democratic
- District created: 2003
- Last contested: 2024
- Communities: Regina

Regina Elphinstone-Centre is a provincial electoral district for the Legislative Assembly of Saskatchewan, Canada. The constituency and its predecessors have been among the most reliable in the province for the NDP (and its predecessor the CCF), having elected members of the party continuously since 1944.

== Members of the Legislative Assembly ==
Parliament	Years	Member	Party
Riding created from Regina Elphinstone and Regina Centre
25th	2003–2007	Warren McCall	New Democrat
26th	2007–2011	Warren McCall	New Democrat
27th	2011–2016	Warren McCall	New Democrat
28th	2016–2020	Warren McCall	New Democrat
29th	2020–2024	Meara Conway	New Democrat
30th	2024–present	Meara Conway	New Democrat

== Election results ==
2024 Saskatchewan general election
Party	Candidate	Votes	%	±%
New Democratic	Meara Conway	3,268	61.08	-0.33
Saskatchewan	Caesar Khan	1,417	26.49	-1.27
Saskatchewan United	Pamela Carpenter	310	5.79	–
Progress	Nathan Bruce	199	3.72	–
Green	Jim Elliott	156	2.92	-3.49
Total valid votes		5,350	99.42	
Total rejected ballots		31	0.58	-0.90
Turnout		5,381	38.06	+5.95
Eligible voters		14,138		
New Democratic hold		Swing		–
Source: Elections Saskatchewan

2020 Saskatchewan general election
Party	Candidate	Votes	%	±%
New Democratic	Meara Conway	2,491	61.41	+2.23
Saskatchewan	Caesar Khan	1,126	27.76	-2.43
Green	Naomi Hunter	260	6.41	+2.44
Progressive Conservative	Don Kirk	124	3.06	-
Independent	Rolf Hartloff	55	1.36	–
Total valid votes		4,056	98.52	
Total rejected ballots		61	1.48	+1.03
Turnout		4,117	32.11	-6.64
Eligible voters		12,820		
New Democratic hold		Swing		–
Source: Elections Saskatchewan

2016 Saskatchewan general election
Party	Candidate	Votes	%	±%
New Democratic	Warren McCall	2,648	59.18	+2.53
Saskatchewan	Bill Stevenson	1,351	30.19	-8.75
Liberal	Patrick Denis	297	6.63	-
Green	Dianna Holigroski	178	3.97	-0.44
Total valid votes		4,474	99.55	
Total rejected ballots		20	0.45	–
Turnout		4,494	38.75	–
Eligible voters		11,598		
New Democratic hold		Swing		–
Source: Elections Saskatchewan

2011 Saskatchewan general election
Party	Candidate	Votes	%	±%
New Democratic	Warren McCall	2,581	57.06	-
Saskatchewan	Bill Stevenson	1,743	38.54	-
Green	Ingrid Alesich	199	4.40	-
Total		–	100.00	
New Democratic hold		Swing		–

2007 Saskatchewan general election
Party	Candidate	Votes	%	±%
New Democratic	Warren McCall	3,224	62.47	–
Saskatchewan	Debbi Stevenson	1,182	22.90	–
Liberal	Keitha Kennedy	478	9.26	–
Green	Ingrid Alesich	277	5.37	–
Total		5,161	100.00	
New Democratic hold		Swing		–

2003 Saskatchewan general election
Party	Candidate	Votes	%	±%
New Democratic	Warren McCall	3,078	66.39	–
Saskatchewan	Angie Roe	792	17.09	–
Liberal	Paul Compton	574	12.38	–
New Green	John W. Warnock	110	2.37	–
Progressive Conservative	Janice Schreiner	44	0.95	–
Western Independence	Carl Barabonoff	38	0.82	–
Total		4,636	100.00	

== See also ==
- List of Saskatchewan provincial electoral districts
- List of Saskatchewan general elections
- Canadian provincial electoral districts
