= Keith Jorgenson =

Canadian politician

Member of the Legislative Assembly of Saskatchewan for Saskatoon Churchill-Wildwood
- Incumbent
- Assumed office October 28, 2024
- Preceded by: Lisa Lambert

Personal details
- Political party: Saskatchewan New Democratic Party

Keith Jorgenson is a Canadian politician who was elected to the Legislative Assembly of Saskatchewan in the 2024 general election, representing Saskatoon Churchill-Wildwood as a member of the New Democratic Party.

== Electoral record ==
2024 Saskatchewan general election: Saskatoon Churchill-Wildwood
Party	Candidate	Votes	%	±%
New Democratic	Keith Jorgenson	4,621	57.67	+9.97
Saskatchewan	Lisa Lambert	3,262	40.71	-7.69
Green	Morgan McAdam	130	1.62	-0.18
Total valid votes		8,013	97.04	
Total rejected ballots		244	2.96	+1.81
Turnout		8,257	64.61	+2.71
Eligible voters		12,779		
Source: Elections Saskatchewan
New Democratic gain		Swing		
