= Aleana Young =

Canadian politician

Aleana Young MLA
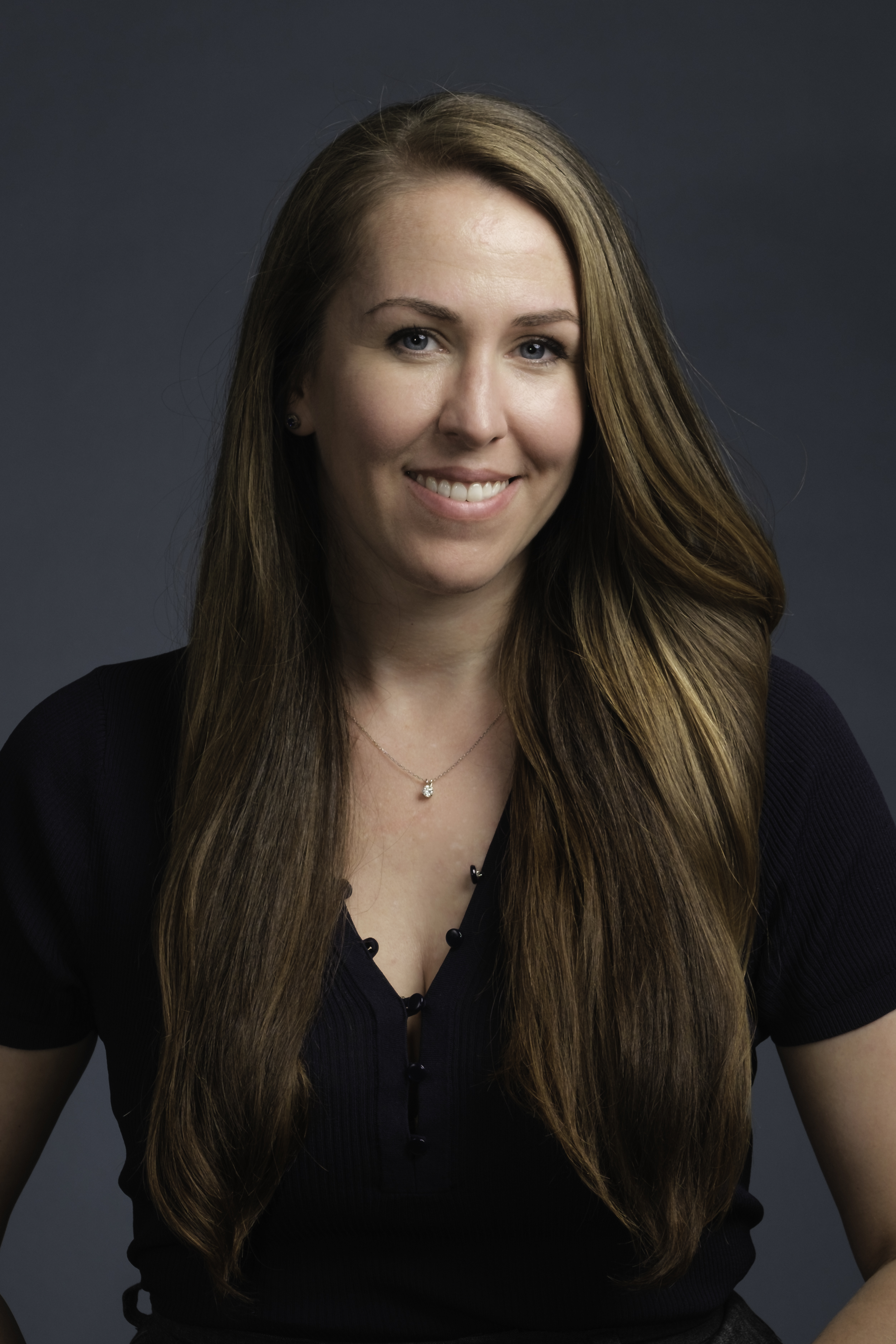
- Young in 2022

Whip of the Saskatchewan New Democratic Party
- Incumbent
- Assumed office October 5, 2024
- Deputy: Nathaniel Teed
- Leader: Carla Beck
- Preceded by: Doyle Vermette

Shadow Minister of Jobs, Economy and Sask Power
- Incumbent
- Assumed office October 5, 2024
- Leader: Carla Beck

Member of the Saskatchewan Legislative Assembly for Regina South Albert
- Incumbent
- Assumed office October 28, 2024
- Preceded by: new constituency

Member of the Saskatchewan Legislative Assembly for Regina University
- In office October 26, 2020 – October 28, 2024
- Preceded by: Tina Beaudry-Mellor
- Succeeded by: Sally Housser

Personal details
- Party: New Democratic
- Education: McGill University
- Occupation: business owner

Aleana Young (A-leena) is a Canadian politician, who was elected to the Legislative Assembly of Saskatchewan in the 2020 Saskatchewan general election. She represents the electoral district of Regina South Albert as a member of the Saskatchewan New Democratic Party caucus.

== Career ==
Prior to her election to the legislature, Young served on Regina's public school board and owned and operated a gourmet cheese shop. She was pregnant during the election campaign and gave birth to a daughter the day before the election.

She defeated Tina Beaudry-Mellor, the incumbent MLA from the Saskatchewan Party.

On November 4, 2020, Young was named NDP critic for Economy and Jobs, Immigration, Trade, Sask Builds, Central Services, SGI, and Sask Power, in addition to serving as the NDP deputy House Leader.

As of June 22, 2024, she serves as the Official Opposition Whip and the Official Opposition critic for Jobs and Economy, Trade and Export Development, SaskPower, Energy and Resources, and Forestry.

In the 2024 Saskatchewan general election Young was re-elected in the newly created constituency of Regina South Albert.

== Electoral history ==
2020 Saskatchewan general election: Regina University
Party	Candidate	Votes	%	±%
New Democratic	Aleana Young	3,478	49.98	+7.02
Saskatchewan	Tina Beaudry-Mellor	3,136	45.07	-3.86
Green	Tanner Wallace	180	2.59	+0.23
Progressive Conservative	Debbie Knill	164	2.36	–
Total valid votes		6,958	99.17	
Total rejected ballots		58	0.83	+0.49
Turnout		7,016	62.78	-1.45
Eligible voters		11,175		
New Democratic gain from Saskatchewan		Swing		–
Source: Elections Saskatchewan

2016 Saskatchewan general election: Regina University
Party	Candidate	Votes	%
Saskatchewan	Tina Beaudry-Mellor	3,418	48.93
New Democratic	Aleana Young	3,001	42.96
Liberal	Silvia Volodko	401	5.74
Green	Yordanos Tesfamariam	165	2.36
Total valid votes		6,985	99.66
Total rejected ballots		24	0.34
Turnout		7,009	64.23
Eligible voters		10,913	
Source: Elections Saskatchewan
