= Muhammad Fiaz =

Canadian politician

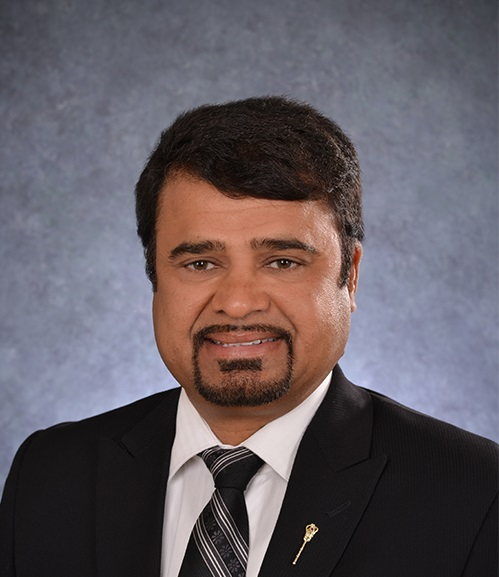

Member of the Saskatchewan Legislative Assembly for Regina Pasqua
- In office April 4, 2016 – October 1, 2024
- Preceded by: Bill Hutchinson
- Succeeded by: Bhajan Brar

Personal details
- Born: Pakistan
- Party: Saskatchewan Party (Provincial); Conservative Party of Canada(Federal)
- Occupation: Small business operator

Muhammad Fiaz is a Canadian politician, who was elected to the Legislative Assembly of Saskatchewan in the 2016 provincial election, and was re-elected in the 2020 election. He represents the electoral district of Regina Pasqua as a member of the Saskatchewan Party. He was defeated in 2024 by elected New Democrat Bjahan Brar.

Fiaz was the first Muslim to be elected to the provincial legislature in Saskatchewan's history.
