= Marv Friesen =

Canadian politician in Saskatchewan

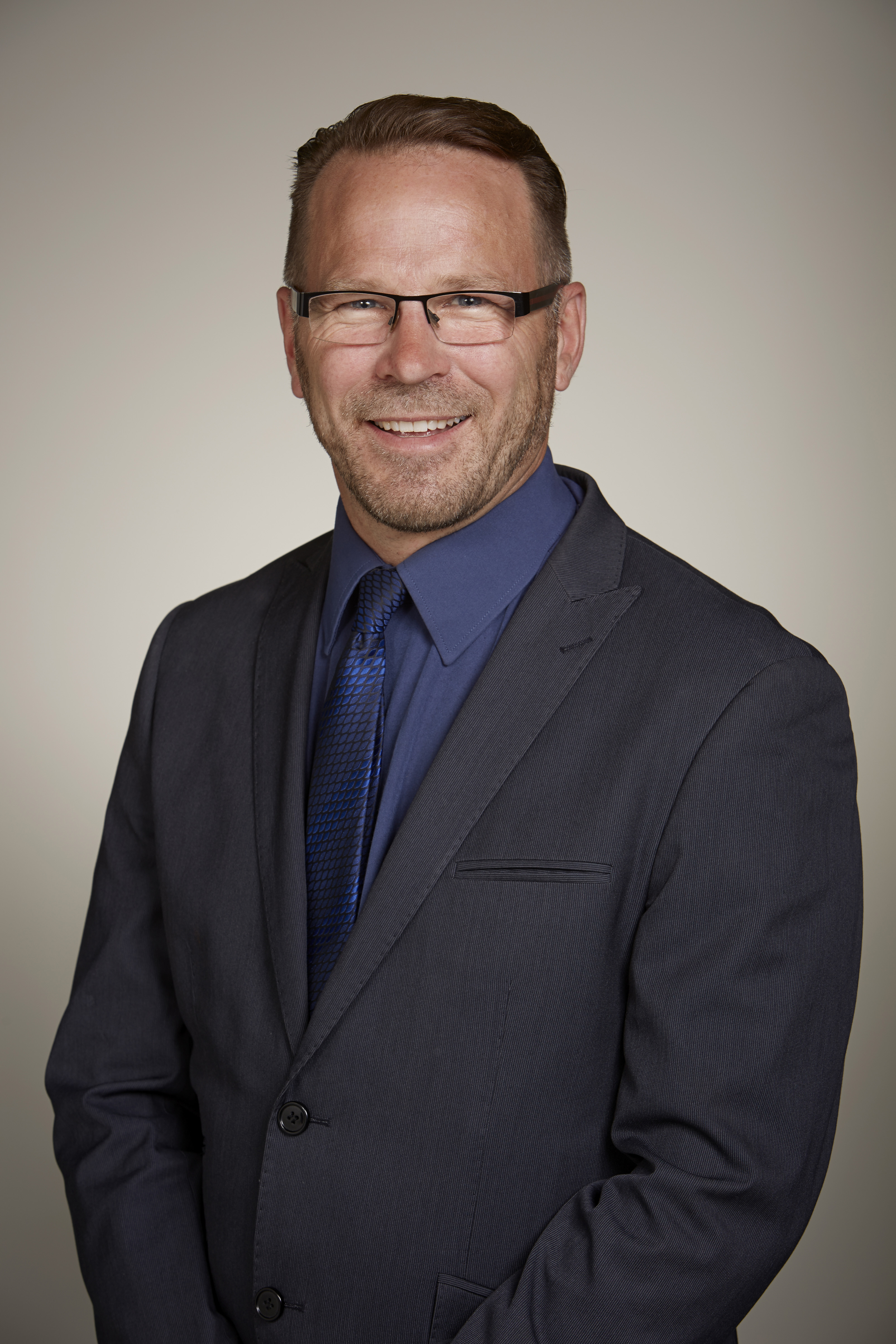

Member of the Saskatchewan Legislative Assembly for Saskatoon Riversdale
- In office October 26, 2020 – October 1, 2024
- Preceded by: Danielle Chartier
- Succeeded by: Kim Breckner

Personal details
- Party: Saskatchewan Party

Marv Friesen is a Canadian politician, who sat in the Legislative Assembly of Saskatchewan from the 2020 Saskatchewan general election until 2024, when he did not stand for re-election. He represented the electoral district of Saskatoon Riversdale as a member of the Saskatchewan Party.

On May 31, 2022, the Premier of Saskatchewan appointed him as the Legislative Secretary for Parks, Culture, and Sport.
