= Bhajan Brar =

Canadian politician

Bhajan Brar MLA

Member of the Saskatchewan Legislative Assembly for Regina Pasqua
- Incumbent
- Assumed office October 28, 2024
- Preceded by: Muhammad Fiaz

Personal details
- Born: May 15, 1950 (age 76)
- Party: Saskatchewan NDP
- Occupation: Electrician, power engineer

Bhajan Brar (born May 15, 1950) is a Canadian politician who was elected to the Legislative Assembly of Saskatchewan in the 2024 general election, representing Regina Pasqua as a member of the New Democratic Party.

== Career ==
Before entering politics, Brar had previously worked as an electrician and power engineer.

In the 2020 Saskatchewan provincial election Brar contested the riding of Regina Pasqua as a member of the Saskatchewan New Democratic Party. He failed to unseat incumbent Muhammad Fiaz, although his loss by only 256 votes was the second closest result in the election.

Brar defeated Fiaz in a rematch in the 2024 Saskatchewan provincial election. Alongside Tajinder Grewal, Brar became the first turban-wearing Sikh to be elected to the Legislative Assembly of Saskatchewan.

== Electoral record ==
2024 Saskatchewan general election: Regina Pasqua
Party	Candidate	Votes	%	±%
New Democratic	Bhajan Brar	3,814	52.35	+7.64
Saskatchewan	Muhammad Fiaz	2,809	38.55	–8.69
Progressive Conservative	Justin Parnell	441	6.02	+2.00
Green	Ekaterina Cabylis	132	1.81	–2.22
Buffalo	Shannon Chapple	90	1.24	–
Total valid votes		7,286	98.83	–0.09
Total rejected ballots		86	1.17	+0.09
Turnout		7,372		
Eligible voters		–		
Source: Elections Saskatchewan
New Democratic gain from Saskatchewan		Swing		–

2020 Saskatchewan general election: Regina Pasqua
Party	Candidate	Votes	%	±%
Saskatchewan	Muhammad Fiaz	4,791	47.24	+3.00
New Democratic	Bhajan Brar	4,535	44.71	+3.83
Green	Heather Lau	409	4.03	+1.94
Progressive Conservative	Harry Frank	408	4.02	+2.06
Total valid votes		10,143	98.92	
Total rejected ballots		111	1.08	+0.70
Turnout		10,254	54.48	-3.91
Eligible voters		18,823		
Saskatchewan hold		Swing		–
Source: Elections Saskatchewan
