= Tina Beaudry-Mellor =

Canadian politician

The Honourable Tina Beaudry-Mellor ECS

Member of the Saskatchewan Legislative Assembly for Regina University
- In office April 4, 2016 – September 29, 2020
- Preceded by: Riding Established
- Succeeded by: Aleana Young

Personal details
- Party: Saskatchewan Party
- Profession: Instructor, Political Science

Tina Beaudry-Mellor is a Canadian politician, who was elected to the Legislative Assembly of Saskatchewan in the 2016 provincial election. She represented the electoral district of Regina University as a member of the Saskatchewan Party until her defeat in the 2020 Saskatchewan general election.

Prior to running for provincial office, Beaudry-Mellor ran and came second in a race for Regina City Council in October 2012 in the southeast Ward 4.

Beaudry-Mellor was named to the Executive Council of Saskatchewan on August 23, 2016, as the Minister of Social Services and Minister Responsible for the Status of Women.

On August 15, 2017, Beaudry-Mellor announced her candidacy for the leadership of the Saskatchewan Party to succeed Brad Wall. Although she was the first candidate to announce her race, Beaudry-Mellor came fifth on the first ballot, with only 1.32% of the votes.

In 2017, Beaudry-Mellor received widespread criticism as minister for approving cuts to funeral services as part of a Saskatchewan budget shortfall.

She is the author of the Saskatchewan Technology Startup Incentive. As Minister Responsible for Innovation Saskatchewan, she led numerous initiatives to grow the start up ecosystem in Saskatchewan, helping Saskatoon become one of the fastest growing tech hubs in Canada and seeing a record year in venture capital investment in 2019. She also helped get important investment funds like the Ag-Tech Growth Fund off the ground.

On the innovation front, she was instrumental in securing both federal and provincial investment into VIDO Intervac's research for a vaccine for COVID-19 as well as funds for their planned manufacturing facility.

As Minister Responsible for the Status of Women, she partnered with Women Entrepreneurs of Saskatchewan to launch the first-in-Canada Women's Economic Advisory table. She was also instrumental in ensuring that Saskatchewan was the first province in Canada to enact Clare's Law to support potential victims of interpersonal violence as well as numerous other initiatives, including bringing attention to sexual assault victims.

== Cabinet positions ==
Saskatchewan provincial government of Scott Moe
Cabinet post (1)
Predecessor	Office	Successor
Herb Cox; Bronwyn Eyre	Minister of Advanced Education; Minister responsible for the Status of Women; February 2, 2018–November 9, 2020	Gene Makowsky; Laura Ross
Saskatchewan provincial government of Brad Wall
Cabinet post (1)
Predecessor	Office	Successor
Donna Harpauer	Minister of Social Services; Minister responsible for the Status of Women; August 23, 2016–August 30, 2017	Paul Merriman; Bronwyn Eyre
