= Saskatoon Churchill-Wildwood =

Provincial electoral district in Saskatchewan, Canada

Saskatchewan electoral district

Provincial electoral district
- Legislature: Legislative Assembly of Saskatchewan
MLA
Keith Jorgenson
New Democratic
- First contested: 2016
- Last contested: 2024
- Communities: Saskatoon

Saskatoon Churchill-Wildwood is a provincial electoral district for the Legislative Assembly of Saskatchewan, Canada. It was first contested in the 2016 election. The district was created out of parts of Saskatoon Greystone, Saskatoon Eastview, and Saskatoon Nutana.

== Members of the Legislative Assembly ==
| Legislature | Years | Member | Party |
|---|---|---|---|
District created from Saskatoon Greystone, Saskatoon Eastview and Saskatoon Nutana
| 28th | 2016–2020 | Lisa Lambert | Saskatchewan Party |
| 29th | 2020–2024 | Lisa Lambert | Saskatchewan Party |
| 30th | 2024-present | Keith Jorgenson | New Democratic Party |

== Election results ==
2024 Saskatchewan general election
| Party | Candidate | Votes | % | ±% |
|---|---|---|---|---|
| New Democratic | Keith Jorgenson | 4,621 | 57.67 | +9.97 |
| Saskatchewan | Lisa Lambert | 3,262 | 40.71 | -7.69 |
| Green | Morgan McAdam | 130 | 1.62 | -0.18 |
| Total valid votes | | 8,013 | 97.04 | |
| Total rejected ballots | | 244 | 2.96 | +1.81 |
| Turnout | | 8,257 | 64.61 | +2.71 |
| Eligible voters | | 12,779 | | |
Source: Elections Saskatchewan
| New Democratic gain | | Swing | | |

2020 provincial election redistributed results
| Party | % |
|---|---|
| Saskatchewan | 48.4 |
| New Democratic | 47.7 |
| Progressive Conservative | 2.1 |
| Green | 1.8 |

2020 Saskatchewan general election
| Party | Candidate | Votes | % | ±% |
|---|---|---|---|---|
| Saskatchewan | Lisa Lambert | 3,839 | 49.55 | -3.04 |
| New Democratic | Dave McGrane | 3,580 | 46.21 | +5.97 |
| Progressive Conservative | John Lowe | 198 | 2.56 | – |
| Green | Gillian Walker | 130 | 1.68 | -0.01 |
| Total valid votes | | 7,747 | 98.85 | |
| Total rejected ballots | | 90 | 1.15 | – |
| Turnout | | 7,837 | 61.90 | – |
| Eligible voters | | 12,660 | | |
| Saskatchewan hold | | Swing | | – |
Source: Elections Saskatchewan

2016 Saskatchewan general election
| Party | Candidate | Votes | % | ±% |
|---|---|---|---|---|
| Saskatchewan | Lisa Lambert | 3,978 | 52.59 | – |
| New Democratic | Tanya Dunn-Pierce | 3,044 | 40.24 | – |
| Liberal | Chris Chovin | 414 | 5.47 | – |
| Green | Colleen Kennedy | 128 | 1.69 | – |
| Total valid votes | | 7,564 | 100.0 | |
| Eligible voters | | – | | |
Source: Elections Saskatchewan

== See also ==
- List of Saskatchewan provincial electoral districts
- List of Saskatchewan general elections
- Canadian provincial electoral districts
