= Regina University =

Provincial electoral district in Saskatchewan, Canada

Saskatchewan electoral district

Provincial electoral district
- Legislature: Legislative Assembly of Saskatchewan
MLA
Sally Housser
New Democratic
- District created: 2013
- First contested: 2016
- Last contested: 2024
- Communities: Regina

Regina University is a provincial electoral district for the Legislative Assembly of Saskatchewan, Canada. It was first contested in the 2016 election. The district was created from parts of Regina South, Regina Douglas Park, and Regina Wascana Plains.

== Members of the Legislative Assembly ==
Legislature	Years	Member	Party
District created from Regina South, Regina Douglas Park and Regina Wascana Plains
28th	2016–2020	Tina Beaudry-Mellor	Saskatchewan Party
29th	2020–2024	Aleana Young	New Democrat
30th	2024-present	Sally Housser	New Democrat

== Election results ==
2024 Saskatchewan general election
Party	Candidate	Votes	%	±%
New Democratic	Sally Housser	4,081	52.20	+18.40
Saskatchewan	Gene Makowsky	3,426	43.82	-20.08
Progressive Conservative	Corie Rempel	233	2.98	+0.62
Green	Cedar Park	78	1.00	-1.20
Total valid votes		7,818	99.75	
Total rejected ballots		59	0.25	-0.58
Turnout		7,877	66.83	+4.05
Eligible voters		11,786		
Source: Elections Saskatchewan
New Democratic gain		Swing		

2020 provincial election redistributed results
Party	%
Saskatchewan	55.6
New Democratic	40.0
Green	2.1
Others	2.3

2020 Saskatchewan general election
Party	Candidate	Votes	%	±%
New Democratic	Aleana Young	3,478	49.98	+7.02
Saskatchewan	Tina Beaudry-Mellor	3,136	45.07	-3.86
Green	Tanner Wallace	180	2.59	+0.23
Progressive Conservative	Debbie Knill	164	2.36	–
Total valid votes		6,958	99.17	
Total rejected ballots		58	0.83	+0.49
Turnout		7,016	62.78	-1.45
Eligible voters		11,175		
New Democratic gain from Saskatchewan		Swing		–
Source: Elections Saskatchewan

2016 Saskatchewan general election
Party	Candidate	Votes	%
Saskatchewan	Tina Beaudry-Mellor	3,418	48.93
New Democratic	Aleana Young	3,001	42.96
Liberal	Silvia Volodko	401	5.74
Green	Yordanos Tesfamariam	165	2.36
Total valid votes		6,985	99.66
Total rejected ballots		24	0.34
Turnout		7,009	64.23
Eligible voters		10,913	
Source: Elections Saskatchewan

== See also ==
- List of Saskatchewan provincial electoral districts
- List of Saskatchewan general elections
- Canadian provincial electoral districts
