= Lisa Lambert (politician) =

Canadian politician

Member of the Saskatchewan Legislative Assembly for Saskatoon Churchill-Wildwood
- In office April 4, 2016 – October 1, 2024
- Preceded by: Rob Norris
- Succeeded by: Keith Jorgenson

Personal details
- Party: Saskatchewan Party
- Spouse: Jim Lambert

Lisa Lambert is a Canadian politician, who was elected to the Legislative Assembly of Saskatchewan in the 2016 provincial election, and re-elected in 2020. She represented the electoral district of Saskatoon Churchill-Wildwood as a member of the Saskatchewan Party until her defeat in the 2024 Saskatchewan provincial election.
