= Regina Pasqua =

Provincial electoral district in Saskatchewan, Canada

Saskatchewan electoral district

Provincial electoral district
- Legislature: Legislative Assembly of Saskatchewan
MLA
Bhajan Brar
New Democratic
- District created: 2013
- First contested: 2016
- Last contested: 2024
- Communities: Regina

Regina Pasqua is a provincial electoral district for the Legislative Assembly of Saskatchewan, Canada. It was first contested in the 2016 election. The riding was created from parts of Regina South, Regina Lakeview, Regina Rosemont, and Regina Qu'Appelle Valley districts.

The riding lost significant territory to Regina Lakeview and Regina Mount Royal before the 2024 general election.

== Members of the Legislative Assembly ==
Legislature	Years	Member	Party
District created from Regina South, Regina Lakeview, Regina Rosemont and Regina Qu'Appelle Valley
28th	2016–2020	Muhammad Fiaz	Saskatchewan Party
29th	2020–2024	Muhammad Fiaz	Saskatchewan Party
30th	2024-present	Bhajan Brar	New Democratic Party

== Election results ==
2024 Saskatchewan general election
Party	Candidate	Votes	%	±%
New Democratic	Bhajan Brar	3,814	52.35	+7.75
Saskatchewan	Muhammad Fiaz	2,809	38.55	–10.75
Progressive Conservative	Justin Parnell	441	6.02	+2.62
Green	Ekaterina Cabylis	132	1.81	–0.89
Buffalo	Shannon Chapple	90	1.24	–
Total valid votes		7,286	98.83	–0.09
Total rejected ballots		86	1.17	+0.09
Turnout		7,372		
Eligible voters		–		
Source: Elections Saskatchewan
New Democratic gain from Saskatchewan		Swing		–

2020 provincial election redistributed results
Party	%
Saskatchewan	49.3
New Democratic	44.6
Progressive Conservative	3.4
Green	2.7

2020 Saskatchewan general election
Party	Candidate	Votes	%	±%
Saskatchewan	Muhammad Fiaz	4,791	47.24	+3.00
New Democratic	Bhajan Brar	4,535	44.71	+3.83
Green	Heather Lau	409	4.03	+1.94
Progressive Conservative	Harry Frank	408	4.02	+2.06
Total valid votes		10,143	98.92	
Total rejected ballots		111	1.08	+0.70
Turnout		10,254	54.48	-3.91
Eligible voters		18,823		
Saskatchewan hold		Swing		–
Source: Elections Saskatchewan

2016 Saskatchewan general election
Party	Candidate	Votes	%
Saskatchewan	Muhammad Fiaz	3,929	44.24
New Democratic	Heather McIntyre	3,631	40.88
Liberal	Darrin Lamoureux	962	10.83
Green	Mike Wright	186	2.09
Progressive Conservative	Desmond Bilsky	174	1.96
Total valid votes		8,882	99.62
Total rejected ballots		34	0.38
Turnout		8,916	58.39
Eligible voters		15,269	
Source: Elections Saskatchewan

== See also ==
- List of Saskatchewan provincial electoral districts
- List of Saskatchewan general elections
- Canadian provincial electoral districts
