= 2020 Saskatchewan general election =

Canadian provincial election

- October 26, 2020

61 seats in the Legislative Assembly of Saskatchewan 31 seats needed for a majority
- Opinion polls
- Turnout: 54.2% ▼3.6%
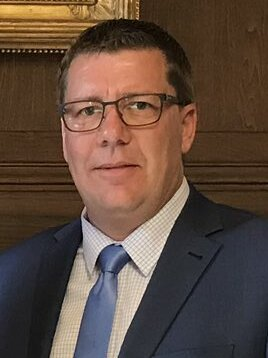

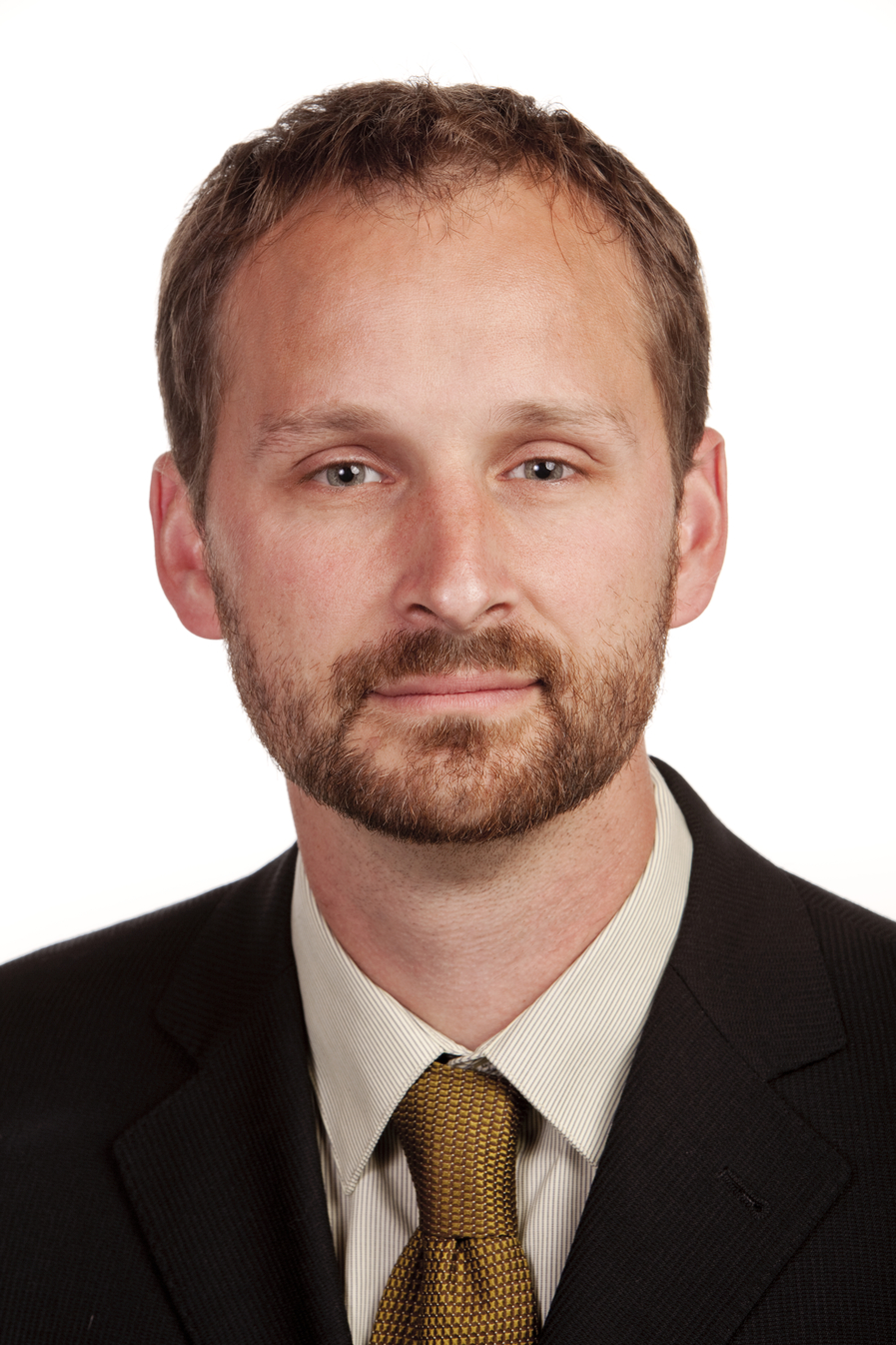
	First party	Second party
Leader	Scott Moe	Ryan Meili
Party	Saskatchewan	New Democratic
Leader since	January 27, 2018	March 3, 2018
Leader's seat	Rosthern-Shellbrook	Saskatoon Meewasin
Last election	51 seats, 62.53%	10 seats, 30.28%
Seats before	46	13
Seats won	48	13
Seat change	▼3	▲3
Popular vote	269,996	140,584
Percentage	61.12%	31.82%
Swing	▼1.41 pp	▲1.54 pp
- Popular vote by riding
Premier before election
Scott Moe
Saskatchewan
Premier after election
Scott Moe
Saskatchewan

The 2020 Saskatchewan general election was held on October 26, 2020 to elect members of the Legislative Assembly of Saskatchewan. This date was set by Saskatchewan's fixed election date law. The writ was dropped on September 29 just in time to hold the election on October 26.

The previous election re-elected the Saskatchewan Party to its third consecutive majority government under the leadership of Brad Wall. On August 10, 2017, Wall announced his resignation as leader, pending the election of his successor. On January 27, 2018, Environment Minister Scott Moe was elected leader of the Saskatchewan Party. He was appointed and sworn in as premier on February 2.

The conservative Saskatchewan Party under Moe was re-elected to its fourth consecutive majority government.

== Date ==
Since 2010, the Legislative Assembly has had a fixed four-year term. According to the 2019 amendment to The Legislative Assembly Act, 2007 (Saskatchewan), "the first general election after the coming into force of this subsection must be held on Monday, October 26, 2020". However, the act also provides that if the election period overlaps with a federal election period, the provincial election is to be postponed until the first Monday of the following April; in this case: April 5, 2021. Because the 43rd Canadian Parliament was a minority Parliament, such a federal election was possible, but it did not occur prior to the provincial election being called. The fixed election law does not infringe on the lieutenant governor's right to dissolve the Legislative Assembly at an earlier date on the premier's advice.

Although Premier Moe hinted at the possibility of calling a snap election in spring 2020, Moe announced on March 12 that he would not do so, citing the ongoing COVID-19 pandemic in Saskatchewan.

This was the third provincial election held in Canada during the COVID-19 pandemic in Canada after New Brunswick and British Columbia.

== Incumbents not contesting their seats ==
=== Retiring incumbents ===
Saskatchewan Party

- Nancy Heppner, Martensville-Warman
- Warren Michelson, Moose Jaw North
- Dan D'Autremont, Cannington
- Glen Hart, Last Mountain-Touchwood
- Herb Cox, The Battlefords
- Larry Doke, Cut Knife-Turtleford
- Greg Brkich, Arm River

New Democratic Party

- Cathy Sproule, Saskatoon Nutana
- David Forbes, Saskatoon Centre
- Warren McCall, Regina Elphinstone-Centre
- Danielle Chartier, Saskatoon Riversdale

== Results ==
Like the previous election, few seats changed hands, though there was a small swing in the overall popular vote to the NDP. The Saskatchewan Party retained its sweep of the central and southern rural ridings, with no rural seats changing hands. Overall, the NDP's seat total was left unchanged at 13. No other party won any seats.

Saskatoon saw a swing to the NDP, with the New Democrats recording a net gain of one seat. The NDP picked up Saskatoon Eastview and Saskatoon University from the Sask. Party, however (especially given the overall swing to the NDP in the cities) the surprise of the night was in Saskatoon Riversdale, the riding of former premier Roy Romanow, which was won by the Saskatchewan Party for the first time. It was only the second time in that riding's history it was not won by the NDP, and arguably an even bigger upset since the only other such occasion was the 1982 Progressive Conservative landslide in which (unlike in 2020) the Tories took all of Saskatoon.

Regina also saw a swing towards the NDP, which gained Regina University from the Saskatchewan Party. However, this was balanced by the loss of its 2018 by-election gain of Regina Northeast. The Saskatchewan Party also re-gained the seat of Prince Albert Northcote, leaving the NDP shut out outside of Saskatoon, Regina and Northern Saskatchewan.

The newly formed Buffalo Party finished second in four rural ridings, and finished third place in the overall popular vote despite running far fewer candidates than the Green Party or the Progressive Conservatives. The PC's finished fifth behind the Greens in overall popular vote, but recorded more votes per candidate than the Greens. The Greens were the only other party besides the Saskatchewan Party and NDP to run anything close to a full slate of candidates, but averaged barely more votes per candidate on average than the essentially dormant Liberal Party. The Liberals ran only three paper candidates in order to maintain their party registration and did not run a meaningful campaign.

Election to the 29th Saskatchewan Legislature
Party	Leader	Candidates	Votes				Seats		
Party	Leader	Candidates	#	±	%	Change (pp)	2016	2020	±
Saskatchewan	Scott Moe	61	269,996	780▼	61.12	-1.41	51	48 / 61	3▼
New Democratic	Ryan Meili	61	140,576	9,439▲	31.82	1.54	10	13 / 61	3▲
Buffalo	Wade Sira (i)	17	11,298	11,298▲	2.56	2.56			
Green	Naomi Hunter	60	10,031	2,064▲	2.27	0.43			
Progressive Conservative	Ken Grey	31	8,404	2,833▲	1.90	0.62			
Independent		3	1,076	617▼	0.24	-0.15			
Liberal	Robert Rudachyk (i)	3	355	15,213▼	0.08	-3.51			
**Total**		236	441,736		100.00%				
Rejected ballots			3,261	146▲					
Turnout			444,997	10,753▲	54.17%	2.65▼			
Registered voters			821,422	57,158▲					

=== Historical results from 1991 onwards ===
View source data.
Graph of Saskatchewan general election results by share of votes, 1991–2020; omitted are minor parties consistently registering less than 2% of the vote.
View source data.
Graph of Saskatchewan general election results by seats won, 1991–2020; those of independent MNAs are omitted.

=== Synopsis of results ===
2020 Saskatchewan general election - synopsis of riding results
Riding (Note: sorted as per results summary)	Winning party							Turnout (Note: including rejected and declined ballots)	Votes							
Riding	2016	Party	1st place	Share	Margin #	Margin %	2nd place	Turnout	Sask	NDP	Buff	Grn	PC	Lib	Ind	Total
Arm River	Sask	Sask	6,569	76.98%	5,233	61.33%	NDP	65.26%	6,569	1,336	–	197	431	–	–	8,533
Athabasca	NDP	NDP	1,730	56.80%	618	20.29%	Sask	33.63%	1,112	1,730	–	204	–	–	–	3,046
Batoche	Sask	Sask	4,357	65.28%	2,546	38.15%	NDP	56.47%	4,357	1,811	–	156	350	–	–	6,674
Biggar-Sask Valley	Sask	Sask	5,775	73.52%	4,582	58.33%	NDP	57.60%	5,775	1,193	698	189	–	–	–	7,855
Cannington	Sask	Sask	5,781	73.77%	4,542	57.96%	Buff	62.38%	5,781	680	1,239	136	–	–	–	7,836
Canora-Pelly	Sask	Sask	4,343	68.31%	2,819	44.34%	NDP	54.04%	4,343	1,524	358	133	–	–	–	6,358
Carrot River Valley	Sask	Sask	4,833	74.54%	3,551	54.77%	NDP	52.58%	4,833	1,282	–	90	279	–	–	6,484
Cumberland	NDP	NDP	2,807	66.53%	1,511	35.81%	Sask	29.34%	1,296	2,807	–	116	–	–	–	4,219
Cut Knife-Turtleford	Sask	Sask	5,517	76.91%	4,574	63.77%	NDP	55.46%	5,517	943	572	141	–	–	–	7,173
Cypress Hills	Sask	Sask	4,685	65.13%	3,296	45.82%	Buff	57.11%	4,685	681	1,389	110	328	–	–	7,193
Estevan	Sask	Sask	4,409	62.43%	2,696	38.18%	Buff	57.85%	4,409	470	1,713	116	354	–	–	7,062
Humboldt-Watrous	Sask	Sask	5,713	72.81%	4,533	57.77%	NDP	61.87%	5,713	1,180	529	181	243	–	–	7,846
Indian Head-Milestone	Sask	Sask	5,626	67.02%	3,255	38.77%	NDP	59.56%	5,626	2,371	–	147	251	–	–	8,395
Kelvington-Wadena	Sask	Sask	4,791	69.57%	3,568	51.81%	NDP	57.57%	4,791	1,223	370	172	331	–	–	6,887
Kindersley	Sask	Sask	5,269	74.40%	4,228	59.70%	Buff	57.87%	5,269	508	1,041	70	194	–	–	7,082
Last Mountain-Touchwood	Sask	Sask	4,461	62.44%	2,661	37.24%	NDP	60.09%	4,461	1,800	411	146	327	–	–	7,145
Lloydminster	Sask	Sask	3,846	82.41%	3,316	71.05%	NDP	30.45%	3,846	530	235	56	–	–	–	4,667
Lumsden-Morse	Sask	Sask	6,243	73.40%	4,714	55.42%	NDP	63.39%	6,243	1,529	509	225	–	–	–	8,506
Martensville-Warman	Sask	Sask	7,137	74.01%	5,358	55.56%	NDP	53.53%	7,137	1,779	566	161	–	–	–	9,643
Meadow Lake	Sask	Sask	4,540	71.63%	2,913	45.96%	NDP	46.08%	4,540	1,627	–	171	–	–	–	6,338
Melfort	Sask	Sask	5,550	77.58%	4,418	61.76%	NDP	57.52%	5,550	1,132	369	103	–	–	–	7,154
Melville-Saltcoats	Sask	Sask	5,394	75.94%	4,146	58.37%	NDP	56.10%	5,394	1,248	–	137	324	–	–	7,103
Moose Jaw North	Sask	Sask	4,733	63.75%	2,201	29.65%	NDP	58.24%	4,733	2,532	–	159	–	–	–	7,424
Moose Jaw Wakamow	Sask	Sask	3,466	53.40%	822	12.66%	NDP	50.60%	3,466	2,644	–	142	239	–	–	6,491
Moosomin	Sask	Sask	5,467	77.78%	4,324	61.52%	NDP	54.82%	5,467	1,143	–	171	248	–	–	7,029
Prince Albert Carlton	Sask	Sask	3,867	57.68%	1,304	19.45%	NDP	48.30%	3,867	2,563	–	99	175	–	–	6,704
Prince Albert Northcote	NDP	Sask	2,652	48.84%	195	3.59%	NDP	37.78%	2,652	2,457	–	106	215	–	–	5,430
Regina Coronation Park	Sask	Sask	2,913	48.87%	283	4.75%	NDP	47.64%	2,913	2,630	–	191	227	–	–	5,961
Regina Douglas Park	NDP	NDP	3,545	60.14%	1,737	29.47%	Sask	46.04%	1,808	3,545	–	211	331	–	–	5,895
Regina Elphinstone-Centre	NDP	NDP	2,491	61.42%	1,365	33.65%	Sask	32.13%	1,126	2,491	–	260	124	–	55	4,056
Regina Gardiner Park	Sask	Sask	4,342	60.78%	1,800	25.20%	NDP	57.88%	4,342	2,542	–	142	118	–	–	7,144
Regina Lakeview	NDP	NDP	4,739	65.47%	2,545	35.16%	Sask	59.46%	2,194	4,739	–	202	–	103	–	7,238
Regina Northeast	Sask	Sask	3,709	49.60%	450	6.02%	NDP	58.32%	3,709	3,259	–	135	272	103	–	7,478
Regina Pasqua	Sask	Sask	4,791	47.23%	256	2.52%	NDP	54.30%	4,791	4,535	–	409	408	–	–	10,143
Regina Rochdale	Sask	Sask	5,981	56.18%	1,841	17.29%	NDP	62.64%	5,981	4,140	–	209	317	–	–	10,647
Regina Rosemont	NDP	NDP	4,094	57.83%	1,572	22.21%	Sask	53.38%	2,522	4,094	–	168	295	–	–	7,079
Regina University	Sask	NDP	3,478	49.99%	342	4.92%	Sask	62.78%	3,136	3,478	–	180	164	–	–	6,958
Regina Walsh Acres	Sask	Sask	3,148	46.62%	606	8.98%	NDP	56.49%	3,148	2,542	–	–	265	–	797	6,752
Regina Wascana Plains	Sask	Sask	7,209	63.80%	3,590	31.77%	NDP	63.63%	7,209	3,619	–	248	–	–	224	11,300
Rosetown-Elrose	Sask	Sask	5,806	77.70%	4,615	61.76%	NDP	62.54%	5,806	1,191	–	193	282	–	–	7,472
Rosthern-Shellbrook	Sask	Sask	5,341	79.54%	4,257	63.40%	NDP	55.18%	5,341	1,084	–	146	144	–	–	6,715
Saskatchewan Rivers	Sask	Sask	4,401	62.22%	2,562	36.22%	NDP	58.55%	4,401	1,839	292	117	424	–	–	7,073
Saskatoon Centre	NDP	NDP	3,080	58.52%	1,049	19.93%	Sask	39.48%	2,031	3,080	–	152	–	–	–	5,263
Saskatoon Churchill-Wildwood	Sask	Sask	3,839	49.55%	259	3.34%	NDP	61.71%	3,839	3,580	–	130	198	–	–	7,747
Saskatoon Eastview	Sask	NDP	4,063	50.78%	359	4.49%	Sask	62.82%	3,704	4,063	–	234	–	–	–	8,001
Saskatoon Fairview	Sask	NDP	3,759	53.91%	991	14.21%	Sask	47.10%	2,768	3,759	–	131	315	–	–	6,973
Saskatoon Meewasin	Sask	NDP	3,700	51.24%	367	5.08%	Sask	56.27%	3,333	3,700	–	188	–	–	–	7,221
Saskatoon Northwest	Sask	Sask	4,390	62.17%	1,871	26.50%	NDP	60.36%	4,390	2,519	–	152	–	–	–	7,061
Saskatoon Nutana	NDP	NDP	4,777	65.13%	2,438	33.24%	Sask	56.95%	2,339	4,777	–	219	–	–	–	7,335
Saskatoon Riversdale	NDP	Sask	2,984	49.18%	81	1.34%	NDP	45.96%	2,984	2,903	–	180	–	–	–	6,067
Saskatoon Silverspring-Sutherland	Sask	Sask	4,272	59.07%	1,535	21.23%	NDP	54.25%	4,272	2,737	–	223	–	–	–	7,232
Saskatoon Southeast	Sask	Sask	5,679	63.58%	2,599	29.10%	NDP	59.59%	5,679	3,080	–	173	–	–	–	8,932
Saskatoon Stonebridge-Dakota	Sask	Sask	7,584	67.17%	4,501	39.87%	NDP	57.87%	7,584	3,083	334	289	–	–	–	11,290
Saskatoon University	Sask	NDP	3,225	52.97%	495	8.13%	Sask	54.45%	2,730	3,225	–	133	–	–	–	6,088
Saskatoon Westview	Sask	Sask	4,322	54.30%	1,062	13.34%	NDP	51.12%	4,322	3,260	–	229	–	149	–	7,960
Saskatoon Willowgrove	Sask	Sask	7,509	66.38%	3,909	34.56%	NDP	56.81%	7,509	3,600	–	203	–	–	–	11,312
Swift Current	Sask	Sask	5,620	78.44%	4,199	58.60%	NDP	57.11%	5,620	1,421	–	124	–	–	–	7,165
The Battlefords	Sask	Sask	4,477	66.19%	2,546	37.64%	NDP	48.04%	4,477	1,931	–	125	231	–	–	6,764
Weyburn-Big Muddy	Sask	Sask	5,972	77.01%	4,951	63.84%	NDP	61.70%	5,972	1,021	673	89	–	–	–	7,755
Wood River	Sask	Sask	6,413	82.79%	5,328	68.78%	NDP	63.33%	6,413	1,085	–	248	–	–	–	7,746
Yorkton	Sask	Sask	4,171	74.01%	2,870	50.92%	NDP	44.66%	4,171	1,301	–	164	–	–	–	5,636

= Open seat
= Turnout is above provincial average
= Winning candidate was in previous Legislature
= Incumbent had switched allegiance
= Previously incumbent in another riding
= Not incumbent; was previously elected to the Legislature
= Incumbency arose from byelection gain
= Other incumbents renominated
= NDP candidate - nomination reversed by party leader
= Previously an MP in the House of Commons of Canada
= Multiple candidates

=== Comparative analysis for ridings (2020 vs 2016) ===
Ternary plots of election results
2016

2020
Electoral districts won identified by Saskatchewan Party (green) and NDP (orange).

Summary of riding results by turnout, vote share for winning candidate, and swing (vs 2016)
Riding and winning party			Turnout		Vote share (Note: Share won by winning candidate, with difference noted from share achieved by the same party in 2018.)		Swing (Note: Positive indicates improvement to standing of party winning in 2018; negative points to 2018's second-place party being swung to.)	
Riding and winning party			%	Change (pp)	%	Change (pp)	To	Change (pp)
Arm River	Sask	Hold	65.26	-2.07	76.98	3.59	Sask	2.61
Athabasca	NDP	Hold	33.63	0.22	56.80	-7.88	Sask	-10.33
Batoche	Sask	Hold	56.47	-5.66	65.28	0.52	Sask	2.00
Biggar-Sask Valley	Sask	Hold	57.60	-2.48	73.52	-3.23	Sask	0.13
Cannington	Sask	Hold	62.38	-0.06	73.77	-10.69	NDP	-5.27
Canora-Pelly	Sask	Hold	54.04	-2.72	68.31	0.84	NDP	-1.23
Carrot River Valley	Sask	Hold	52.58	-3.54	74.54	-1.43	NDP	-0.41
Cumberland	NDP	Hold	29.34	-9.59	66.53	4.22	NDP	1.61
Cut Knife-Turtleford	Sask	Hold	55.46	-2.40	76.91	-2.91	NDP	-1.40
Cypress Hills	Sask	Hold	57.11	-3.71	65.13	-14.37	NDP	-5.89
Estevan	Sask	Hold	57.85	-0.49	62.43	-15.43	NDP	-6.51
Humboldt-Watrous	Sask	Hold	61.87	-2.10	72.81	-1.73	Sask	1.79
Indian Head-Milestone	Sask	Hold	59.56	0.57	67.02	-0.34	NDP	-2.13
Kelvington-Wadena	Sask	Hold	57.57	-4.18	69.57	-0.41	Sask	0.14
Kindersley	Sask	Hold	57.87	-1.87	74.40	6.45	N/A (Note: Jason Dearborn (independent in 2016, coming in at 2nd place) chose not to run in 2020.)	
Last Mountain-Touchwood	Sask	Hold	60.09	0.33	62.44	0.26	NDP	-1.03
Lloydminster	Sask	Hold	30.45	-6.94	82.41	-3.75	NDP	-3.27
Lumsden-Morse	Sask	Hold	63.39	-1.48	73.40	-1.69	Sask	0.10
Martensville-Warman	Sask	Hold	53.53	-2.91	74.01	-5.44	NDP	-3.38
Meadow Lake	Sask	Hold	46.08	-0.58	71.63	1.16	NDP	-0.79
Melfort	Sask	Hold	57.52	-1.71	77.58	0.49	Sask	2.05
Melville-Saltcoats	Sask	Hold	56.10	-3.52	75.94	3.20	Sask	3.74
Moose Jaw North	Sask	Hold	58.24	-0.61	63.75	2.95	Sask	1.72
Moose Jaw Wakamow	Sask	Hold	50.60	-1.88	53.40	0.32	Sask	1.08
Moosomin	Sask	Hold	54.82	-1.89	77.78	5.47	Sask	1.86
Prince Albert Carlton	Sask	Hold	48.30	-3.11	57.68	2.87	Sask	2.91
Prince Albert Northcote	Sask	Gain	37.78	-5.59	48.84	4.38	Sask	-4.12
Regina Coronation Park	Sask	Hold	47.64	-4.47	48.87	1.02	Sask	1.20
Regina Douglas Park	NDP	Hold	46.04	-8.44	60.14	10.30	NDP	9.27
Regina Elphinstone-Centre	NDP	Hold	32.13	-6.62	61.42	2.23	NDP	2.33
Regina Gardiner Park	Sask	Hold	57.88	-3.07	60.78	1.21	Sask	0.01
Regina Lakeview	NDP	Hold	59.46	-4.91	65.47	8.99	NDP	6.93
Regina Northeast	Sask	Hold	58.32	0.51	49.60	-5.05	NDP	-4.02
Regina Pasqua	Sask	Hold	54.30	-4.09	47.23	3.00	NDP	-0.42
Regina Rochdale	Sask	Hold	62.64	0.59	56.18	-2.87	NDP	-2.69
Regina Rosemont	NDP	Hold	53.38	-5.18	57.83	3.88	NDP	5.07
Regina University	NDP	Gain	62.78	-1.45	49.99	7.02	NDP	-5.44
Regina Walsh Acres	Sask	Hold	56.49	-2.09	46.62	-4.68	Sask	0.19
Regina Wascana Plains	Sask	Hold	63.63	-1.19	63.80	-1.75	NDP	-3.34
Rosetown-Elrose	Sask	Hold	62.54	-4.28	77.70	0.04	Sask	1.07
Rosthern-Shellbrook	Sask	Hold	55.18	-2.14	79.54	7.95	Sask	5.66
Saskatchewan Rivers	Sask	Hold	58.55	2.00	62.22	-4.81	NDP	-0.71
Saskatoon Centre	NDP	Hold	39.48	-3.65	58.52	1.45	Sask	-0.26
Saskatoon Churchill-Wildwood	Sask	Hold	61.71	0.29	49.55	-3.04	NDP	-4.50
Saskatoon Eastview	NDP	Gain	62.82	0.41	50.78	9.83	NDP	-8.46
Saskatoon Fairview	NDP	Gain	47.10	-2.96	53.91	8.64	NDP	-8.59
Saskatoon Meewasin	NDP	Gain	56.27	-1.33	51.24	8.29	NDP	-6.31
Saskatoon Northwest	Sask	Hold	60.36	0.64	62.17	-3.31	NDP	-4.96
Saskatoon Nutana	NDP	Hold	56.95	1.92	65.13	8.60	NDP	6.65
Saskatoon Riversdale	Sask	Gain	45.96	-1.37	49.18	5.63	Sask	-2.99
Saskatoon Silverspring-Sutherland	Sask	Hold	54.25	-0.49	59.07	-4.62	NDP	-7.00
Saskatoon Southeast	Sask	Hold	59.59	0.62	63.58	-4.17	NDP	-5.32
Saskatoon Stonebridge-Dakota	Sask	Hold	57.87	-2.03	67.17	-2.79	NDP	-2.83
Saskatoon University	NDP	Gain	54.45	-4.20	52.97	10.37	NDP	-6.78
Saskatoon Westview	Sask	Hold	51.12	-3.97	54.30	5.22	Sask	5.30
Saskatoon Willowgrove	Sask	Hold	56.81	-2.37	66.38	-5.73	NDP	-6.79
Swift Current	Sask	Hold	57.11	-3.44	78.44	-4.00	NDP	-4.37
The Battlefords	Sask	Hold	48.04	-5.07	66.19	5.48	Sask	4.44
Weyburn-Big Muddy	Sask	Hold	61.70	-2.24	77.01	-1.73	Sask	0.58
Wood River	Sask	Hold	63.33	-4.73	82.79	6.71	Sask	2.51
Yorkton	Sask	Hold	44.66	-6.80	74.01	1.45	Sask	0.51

=== Seats changing hands ===
Seven seats changed allegiance from 2016:

Sask to NDP

- Regina University
- Saskatoon Eastview
- Saskatoon Fairview
- Saskatoon Meewasin
- Saskatoon University

NDP to Sask

- Prince Albert Northcote
- Saskatoon Riversdale

Resulting composition of the 29th Legislative Assembly of Saskatchewan
Source		Party		
Source		**Sask**	**NDP**	Total
Seats retained	Incumbents returned	38	5	43
Seats retained	Open seats held	7	3	10
Seats retained	Byelection loss reversed	1		1
Seats changing hands	Incumbents defeated	1	2	3
Seats changing hands	Open seats gained	1	1	2
Seats changing hands	Byelection gains held		2	2
**Total**		48	13	61

=== Detailed analysis ===
Party rankings in each riding
Party	Seats	2nd	3rd	4th	5th
Saskatchewan	48	13	–	–	–
New Democratic	13	44	4	–	–
Buffalo	–	4	11	2	–
Green	–	–	24	30	6
Progressive Conservative	–	–	21	10	–
Independent	–	–	1	–	2
Liberal	–	–	–	2	1
Total	61	61	61	44	9

Principal races, according to top-three results
Winning party	2nd-place Party	3rd-place Party	Seats
█ New Democratic	█ Saskatchewan	█ Green	10
█ New Democratic	█ Saskatchewan	█ Progressive Conservative	3
█ Saskatchewan	█ Buffalo	█ New Democratic	4
█ Saskatchewan	█ New Democratic	█ Buffalo	11
█ Saskatchewan	█ New Democratic	█ Green	14
█ Saskatchewan	█ New Democratic	█ Independent	1
█ Saskatchewan	█ New Democratic	█ Progressive Conservative	18
Total			61

=== 5 closest ridings ===
Incumbents are denoted in bold and followed by (I).

Riding	Winner	Runner-up	Vote difference
Saskatoon Riversdale	Marv Friesen	Ashlee Hicks	81
Regina Pasqua	**Muhammad Fiaz (I)**	Bhajan Brar	256
Saskatoon Churchill-Wildwood	**Lisa Lambert (I)**	Dave McGrane	259
Regina Coronation Park	**Mark Docherty (I)**	Noor Burki	283
Regina University	Aleana Young	**Tina Beaudry-Mellor (I)**	342

== Candidates by riding ==
Candidates in bold represent cabinet members and the Speaker of the Legislative Assembly. Party leaders are italicized. The symbol † indicates incumbent MLAs who are not running again.

=== Northwest Saskatchewan ===
Electoral District	Candidates					Incumbent
Electoral District	SK Party	New Democratic	Green	PC	Buffalo	Incumbent
Athabasca	Kelly Kwan; 1,112 (36.52%)	Buckley Belanger; 1,730 (56.81%)	Leroy Laliberte; 204 (6.70%)			Buckley Belanger
Cut Knife-Turtleford	Ryan Domotor; 5,517 (76.91%)	Matt Fedler; 943 (13.15%)	Patrick McNally; 138 (1.97%)		Richard Nelson; 562 (7.97%)	† Larry Doke
Lloydminster	Colleen Young; 3,846 (82.41%)	Colleen Morrell Henning; 530 (11.36%)	Audra Kish; 56 (1.20%)		Steve Gessner; 235 (5.03%)	Colleen Young
Meadow Lake	**Jeremy Harrison**; 4,540 (71.63%)	Harmonie King; 1,627 (25.67%)	Carol Vandale; 171 (2.70%)			**Jeremy Harrison**
Rosthern-Shellbrook	**Scott Moe**; 5,341 (79.54%)	Trina Miller; 1,084 (16.14%)	Larry Neufeld; 146 (2.17%)	Yvonne Choquette; 144 (2.15%)		**Scott Moe**
The Battlefords	Jeremy Cockrill; 4,477 (66.19%)	Amber Stewart; 1,931 (28.55%)	Joey Reynolds; 125 (1.85%)	Harry Zamonsky; 231 (3.41%)		† Herb Cox

=== Northeast Saskatchewan ===
Electoral District	Candidates					Incumbent
Electoral District	SK Party	New Democratic	Green	PC	Buffalo	Incumbent
Batoche	Delbert Kirsch; 4,357 (65.28%)	Lon Borgerson; 1,811 (27.14%)	Hamish Graham; 156 (2.34%)	Carrie Harris; 350 (5.24%)		Delbert Kirsch
Canora-Pelly	Terry Dennis; 4,343 (68.31%)	Stacey Strykowski; 1,524 (23.97%)	Breton Gattinger; 133 (2.09%)		Robert Hayes; 358 (5.63%)	Terry Dennis
Carrot River Valley	Fred Bradshaw; 4,833 (74.54%)	Rod McCorriston; 1,282 (19.77%)	Liam Becker; 90 (1.39%)	Glen Leson; 279 (4.30%)		Fred Bradshaw
Cumberland	Darren Deschambeault; 1,296 (30.15%)	Doyle Vermette; 2,807 (65.31%)	Aaron Oochoo; 116 (2.70%)			Doyle Vermette
Kelvington-Wadena	Hugh Nerlien; 4,791 (69.57%)	Linda Patenaude; 1,223 (17.76%)	Melissa Fletcher; 172 (2.50%)	Wayne Mastrachuk; 331 (4.80%)	Justin Chrobot; 370 (5.37%)	Hugh Nerlien
Melfort	Todd Goudy; 5,550 (77.58%)	Lorne Schroeder; 1,132 (15.82%)	Matthew Diakuw; 103 (1.44%)		Dave Waldner; 369 (5.16%)	Todd Goudy
Prince Albert Carlton	**Joe Hargrave**; 3,867 (57.68%)	Troy Parenteau; 2,563 (38.32%)	Shirley Davis; 99 (1.48%)	Renee Grasby; 175 (2.61%)		**Joe Hargrave**
Prince Albert Northcote	Alana Ross; 2,652 (48.25%)	Nicole Rancourt; 2,457 (44.70%)	Sarah Kraynick; 106 (1.92%)	Jaret Nikolaisen; 215 (3.91%)		Nicole Rancourt
Saskatchewan Rivers	Nadine Wilson; 4,401 (62.22%)	Lyle Whitefish; 1,839 (26.00%)	Marcia Neault; 117 (1.65%)	Shaun Harris; 424 (6.00%)	Fred Lackie; 292 (4.13%)	Nadine Wilson

=== West Central Saskatchewan ===
Electoral District	Candidates					Incumbent
Electoral District	SK Party	New Democratic	Green	PC	Buffalo	Incumbent
Arm River	Dana Skoropad; 6,569 (76.98%)	Cam Goff; 1,336 (15.66%)	Tiffany Giesbrecht; 197 (2.31%)	Steve Forbes; 431 (5.05%)		† Greg Brkich
Biggar-Sask Valley	Randy Weekes; 5,775 (73.52%)	Twyla Harris Naciri; 1,193 (15.19%)	Darcy Robilliard; 189 (2.41%)		Trevor Simpson; 698 (8.88%)	Randy Weekes
Humboldt-Watrous	**Donna Harpauer**; 5,713 (72.81%)	Wendy Sekulich; 1,180 (15.04%)	Jim Ternier; 181 (2.31%)	Rose Buscholl; 243 (3.10%)	Constance Maffenbeier; 529 (6.74%)	**Donna Harpauer**
Kindersley	Ken Francis; 5,269 (74.40%)	Steven Allen; 508 (7.17%)	Evangeline Godron; 70 (0.99%)	Terry Sieben; 194 (2.74%)	Jason Cooper; 1,041 (14.70%)	Ken Francis
Martensville-Warman	Terry Jenson; 7,137 (74.01%)	Carla Streeton; 1,779 (18.45%)	Melvin Pylypchuk; 161 (1.67%)		Wade Sira; 566 (5.87%)	† Nancy Heppner
Rosetown-Elrose	**Jim Reiter**; 5,806 (77.70%)	Brenda Edel; 1,191 (15.94%)	Justina Robinson; 193 (2.58%)	Adrian Janssens; 282 (3.78%)		**Jim Reiter**

=== Southwest Saskatchewan ===
Electoral District	Candidates					Incumbent
Electoral District	SK Party	New Democratic	Green	PC	Buffalo	Incumbent
Cypress Hills	Doug Steele; 4,685 (65.13%)	Kelly Genert; 681 (9.47%)	Dianna Holigroski; 110 (1.53%)	John Goohsen; 328 (4.56%)	Crystal Tiringe; 1,389 (19.31%)	Doug Steele
Lumsden-Morse	Lyle Stewart; 6,243 (73.40%)	Nic Lewis; 1,529 (17.98%)	Isaiah Hunter; 225 (2.64%)		Les Guillemin; 509 (5.98%)	Lyle Stewart
Moose Jaw North	Tim McLeod; 4,733 (63.75%)	Kyle Lichtenwald; 2,532 (34.11%)	North Hunter; 159 (2.14%)			† Warren Michelson
Moose Jaw Wakamow	Greg Lawrence; 3,466 (53.40%)	Melissa Patterson; 2,644 (40.73%)	Abby Firlotte; 142 (2.19%)	Darcy Jensen; 239 (3.68%)		Greg Lawrence
Swift Current	Everett Hindley; 5,620 (78.44%)	Stefan Rumpel; 1,421 (19.83%)	George Watson; 124 (1.73%)			Everett Hindley
Wood River	**Dave Marit**; 6,413 (82.79%)	Roger Morgan; 1,085 (14.01%)	Kimberly Soo Goodtrack; 248 (3.20%)			**Dave Marit**

=== Southeast Saskatchewan ===
Electoral District	Candidates					Incumbent
Electoral District	SK Party	New Democratic	Green	PC	Buffalo	Incumbent
Cannington	Daryl Harrison; 5,781 (73.77%)	Dianne Twietmeyer; 680 (8.68%)	Jaina Forrest; 136 (1.74%)		Wes Smith; 1,239 (15.81%)	† Dan D'Autremont
Estevan	**Lori Carr**; 4,409 (62.43%)	Seth Lendrum; 470 (6.66%)	Scott Meyers; 116 (1.64%)	Linda Sopp; 354 (5.01%)	Phil Zajac; 1,713 (24.26%)	**Lori Carr**
Indian Head-Milestone	Don McMorris; 5,626 (67.02%)	Jared Clarke; 2,371 (28.24%)	Billy Patterson; 147 (1.75%)	Elvin Mandziak; 251 (2.99%)		Don McMorris
Last Mountain-Touchwood	Travis Keisig; 4,461 (62.44%)	Thera Nordal; 1,800 (25.19%)	Justin Stranack; 146 (2.04%)	Victor Teece; 327 (4.58%)	Gordon Bradford; 411 (5.75%)	† Glen Hart
Melville-Saltcoats	**Warren Kaeding**; 5,394 (75.94%)	Bonnie Galenzoski; 1,248 (17.57%)	Jack Powless; 137 (1.93%)	Trever Ratti; 324 (4.56%)		**Warren Kaeding**
Moosomin	Steven Bonk; 5,467 (77.78%)	Ken Burton; 1,143 (16.26%)	Marjorie Graham; 171 (2.43%)	Frank Serfas; 248 (3.53%)		Steven Bonk
Weyburn-Big Muddy	**Dustin Duncan**; 5,972 (77.00%)	Regan Lanning; 1,021 (13.17%)	Shane Caellaigh; 89 ( 1.15%)		Collin Keith; 673 (8.68%)	**Dustin Duncan**
Yorkton	**Greg Ottenbreit**; 4,171 (74.01%)	Carter Antoine; 1,301 (23.08%)	Judy Mergel; 164 (2.91%)			**Greg Ottenbreit**

=== Saskatoon ===
Electoral District	Candidates					Incumbent
Electoral District	SK Party	New Democratic	Green	PC	Other	Incumbent
Saskatoon Centre	Kim Groff; 2,031 (38.59%)	Betty Nippi-Albright; 3,080 (58.52%)	Raven Reid; 152 (2.89%)			† David Forbes
Saskatoon Churchill-Wildwood	Lisa Lambert; 3,839 (49.55%)	Dave McGrane; 3,580 (46.21%)	Gillian Walker; 130 (1.68%)	John Lowe; 198 (2.56%)		Lisa Lambert
Saskatoon Eastview	Chris Guérette; 3,704 (46.29%)	Matt Love; 4,063 (50.78%)	Jan Norris; 234 (2.93%)			Vacant
Saskatoon Fairview	Manny Sadhra; 2,768 (39.69%)	Vicki Mowat; 3,759 (53.91%)	Tobi-Dawne Smith; 131 (1.88%)	Tony Ollenberger; 315 (4.52%)		Vicki Mowat
Saskatoon Meewasin	Rylund Hunter; 3,333 (46.16%)	Ryan Meili; 3,700 (51.24%)	Jacklin Andrews; 188 (2.60%)			Ryan Meili
Saskatoon Northwest	**Gordon Wyant**; 4,390 (62.17%)	Gillian Strange; 2,519 (35.68%)	Maria Krznar; 152 (2.15%)			**Gordon Wyant**
Saskatoon Nutana	Kyle Mazer; 2,339 (31.89%)	Erika Ritchie; 4,777 (65.12%)	Albert Chubak; 219 (2.99%)			† Cathy Sproule
Saskatoon Riversdale	Marv Friesen; 2,984 (49.18%)	Ashlee Hicks; 2,903 (47.85%)	Delanie Passer; 170 (2.97%)			† Danielle Chartier
Saskatoon Silverspring-Sutherland	**Paul Merriman**; 4,272 (59.07%)	Tajinder Grewal; 2,737 (37.85%)	Jaime Fairley; 223 (3.08%)			**Paul Merriman**
Saskatoon Southeast	**Don Morgan**; 5,679 (63.58%)	Pamela Beaudin; 3,080 (34.48%)	Cheryl Mazil; 173 (1.94%)			**Don Morgan**
Saskatoon Stonebridge-Dakota	**Bronwyn Eyre**; 7,584 (67.17%)	Judicaël Moukoumi; 3,083 (27.31%)	Lydia Martens; 289 (2.56%)		Brett Gregg (Buff.); 334 (2.96%)	**Bronwyn Eyre**
Saskatoon University	Eric Olauson; 2,730 (44.84%)	Jennifer Bowes; 3,225 (52.97%)	Erickka Patmore; 125 (2.19%)			Eric Olauson
Saskatoon Westview	David Buckingham; 4,322 (54.29%)	Malik Draz; 3,260 (40.96%)	Glenn Wright; 229 (2.88%)		Robert Rudachyk (Lib.); 149 (1.87%)	David Buckingham
Saskatoon Willowgrove	**Ken Cheveldayoff**; 7,509 (66.38%)	Kaitlyn Harvey; 3,600 (31.82%)	David Greenfield; 203 (1.80%)			**Ken Cheveldayoff**

=== Regina ===
Electoral District	Candidates					Incumbent
Electoral District	SK Party	New Democratic	Green	PC	Other	Incumbent
Regina Coronation Park	**Mark Docherty**; 2,913 (48.87%)	Noor Burki; 2,630 (44.12%)	Irene Browatzke; 195 (3.20%)	David Coates; 221 (3.81%)		**Mark Docherty**
Regina Douglas Park	Nadeem Naz; 1,808 (30.67%)	Nicole Sarauer; 3,545 (60.14%)	Victor Lau; 211 (3.58%)	Sara Healey; 331 (5.61%)		Nicole Sarauer
Regina Elphinstone-Centre	Caesar Khan; 1,126 (27.76%)	Meara Conway; 2,491 (61.41%)	Naomi Hunter; 260 (6.41%)	Don Kirk; 124 (3.06%)	Rolf Hartloff (Ind.); 55 (1.36%)	† Warren McCall
Regina Gardiner Park	**Gene Makowsky**; 4,342 (60.78%)	Faycal Haggui; 2,542 (35.58%)	Helmi Scott Uguh; 142 (1.99%)	David Teece; 118 (1.65%)		**Gene Makowsky**
Regina Lakeview	Megan Patterson; 2,194 (30.31%)	Carla Beck; 4,739 (65.48%)	Michael Wright; 202 (2.79%)		Bruno Sahut (Lib.); 103 (1.42%)	Carla Beck
Regina Northeast	Gary Grewal; 3,709 (49.60%)	Yens Pedersen; 3,259 (43.58%)	Anthony Majore; 132 (1.80%)	Corie Rempel; 265 (3.64%)	Jeff Walters (Lib.); 102 (1.38%)	Yens Pedersen
Regina Pasqua	Muhammad Fiaz; 4,791 (47.24%)	Bhajan Brar; 4,535 (44.71%)	Heather Lau; 409 (4.03%)	Harry Frank; 408 (4.02%)		Muhammad Fiaz
Regina Rochdale	Laura Ross; 5,981 (56.18%)	Brett Estey; 4,140 (38.88%)	Sarah Risk; 209 (1.96%)	Murray Morhart; 317 (2.98%)		Laura Ross
Regina Rosemont	Alex Nau; 2,522 (35.58%)	Trent Wotherspoon; 4,102 (57.86%)	James Park; 170 (2.40%)	Christopher McCulloch; 295 (4.16%)		Trent Wotherspoon
Regina University	**Tina Beaudry-Mellor**; 3,136 (45.07%)	Aleana Young; 3,478 (49.98%)	Tanner Wallace; 180 (2.59%)	Debbie Knill; 164 (2.36%)		**Tina Beaudry-Mellor**
Regina Walsh Acres	Derek Meyers; 3,148 (46.62%)	Kelly Hardy; 2,542 (37.65%)		Ken Grey; 256 (3.93%)	Sandra Morin (Ind.); 776 (11.80%)	Vacant
Regina Wascana Plains	**Christine Tell**; 7,209 (63.79%)	Mike Sinclair; 3,619 (32.03%)	Sonja Doyle; 248 (2.20%)		Nestor Mryglod (Ind.); 224 (1.98%)	**Christine Tell**

== List of MLAs who lost their seat ==
Party	Name	Constituency	Year elected	Seat held by party since	Defeated by	Party
Saskatchewan New Democratic Party	Nicole Rancourt	Prince Albert Northcote	2016	2016	Alana Ross	Saskatchewan Party
Saskatchewan New Democratic Party	Yens Pedersen	Regina Northeast	2018	2018	Gary Grewal	Saskatchewan Party
Saskatchewan Party	Eric Olauson	Saskatoon University	2016	2016	Jennifer Bowes	Saskatchewan New Democratic Party
Saskatchewan Party	Tina Beaudry-Mellor	Regina University	2016	2016	Aleana Young	Saskatchewan New Democratic Party

=== Open seats changing hands ===
Party	Candidate	Incumbent retiring from the House	Constituency	Defeated by	Party
Saskatchewan Party	Chris Guérette	Corey Tochor	Saskatoon Eastview	Matt Love	Saskatchewan New Democratic Party
Saskatchewan New Democratic Party	Ashlee Hicks	Danielle Chartier	Saskatoon Riversdale	Marv Friesen	Saskatchewan Party

== Opinion polls ==
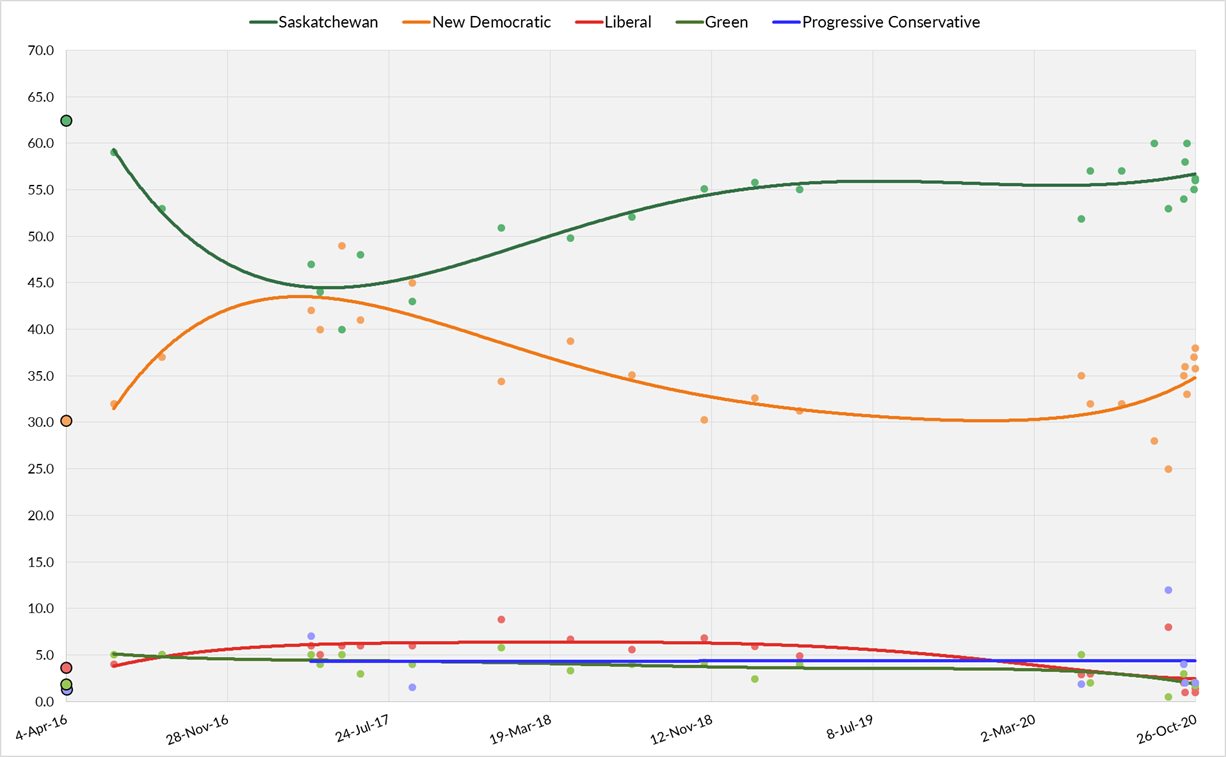

Date(s) conducted	Polling organization/client	Sample size	SK Party	NDP	Liberal	Green	PC	Others	Lead
26 October 2020	2020 election results	445,011	61.1%	31.8%	0.1%	2.3%	1.9%	2.8%	29.3%
25 October 2020	Forum Research	1011	56.2%	35.8%	1.4%	1.7%	n/a	4.9%	20.4%
23–25 October 2020	Research Co.	500	56%	38%	1%	2%	2%	1%	18%
24 October 2020	Mainstreet Research	616	55.2%	37.3%	n/a	2.4%	n/a	4.9%	17.9%
8–13 October 2020	Angus Reid	759	60%	33%	n/a	n/a	n/a	7%	27%
8–10 October 2020	Research Co.	500	58%	36%	1%	2%	2%	1%	22%
6–8 October 2020	Insightrix	801	54%	35%	2%	3%	4%	3%	19%
Sep 29, 2020	Premier Scott Moe announces a general election to be held on October 26, 2020.								
28 Sep 2020	Naveed Anwar steps down as leader of the Saskatchewan Liberal Party.								
16 September 2020	CHASR Research	400	53%	25%	8%	0.5%	12%		28%
10 July-26 August 2020	EKOS Research	1,638	60%	28%				12%	32%
16 June-9 July 2020	EKOS Research	1,240	57%	32%				12%	25%
19–24 May 2020	Angus Reid	459	57%	32%	3%	2%		6%	25%
6–10 May 2020	The Canadian Perspective	792	51.9%	35.0%	2.9%	5.0%	1.9%	3.3%	16.9%
1–7 May 2020	Innovative Research	203	44%	32%	17%	2%		5%	12%
1 Mar 2020	Naomi Hunter is elected leader of the Green Party of Saskatchewan.								
20–22 March 2019	Mainstreet Research	695	55.0%	31.2%	4.9%	4.0%		5.0%	23.8%
14–15 January 2019	Mainstreet Research	830	55.8%	32.6%	5.9%	2.4%		3.3%	23.2%
3 Nov 2018	Ken Grey is elected leader of the Progressive Conservative Party of Saskatchewan.								
30 October-1 November 2018	Mainstreet Research	779	55.1%	30.3%	6.8%	4.2%		3.5%	24.8%
15–17 July 2018	Mainstreet Research	776	52.1%	35.1%	5.6%	4.0%		3.1%	17.0%
16–18 Apr 2018	Mainstreet Research	963	49.8%	38.7%	6.7%	3.3%		1.5%	11.1%
5 May 2018	Naveed Anwar is elected leader of the Saskatchewan Liberal Party.								
3 Mar 2018	Ryan Meili is elected leader of the Saskatchewan NDP.								
2 Feb 2018	Scott Moe becomes Premier of Saskatchewan.								
4–6 Jan 2018	Mainstreet Research	764	50.9%	34.4%	8.8%	5.8%			16.5%
24–27 Aug 2017	The Canadian Perspective	273	42.9%	45.4%	6.2%	4%	1.5%		2.5%
5–12 Jun 2017	Angus Reid	1,053	48%	41%	6%	3%		2%	7%
15–16 May 2017	Mainstreet Research	2,000	40%	49%	6%	5%			9%
11–13 Apr 2017	Insightrix	803	44%	40%	5%	4%	7%		4%
30–31 Mar 2017	Mainstreet Research	1,704	47%	42%	6%	5%			5%
22–23 August 2016	Mainstreet Research	1,690	53%	37%	5%	5%			16%
13 Jun 2016	Mainstreet Research	1,400	59%	32%	4%	5%			27%
4 Apr 2016	2016 election results	433,030	62.4%	30.2%	3.6%	1.8%	1.3%	0.5%	32.2%

== See also ==
- 2021 Canadian federal election in Saskatchewan
