= Saskatchewan New Democratic Party =

Provincial political party in Canada

- Abbreviation: Saskatchewan NDP; Sask NDP
- Leader: Carla Beck
- President: Lenore Pinder
- Deputy Leader: Vicki Mowat
- Founded: 1932; 94 years ago
- Preceded by: Farmer-Labour Group (1932–1935); Saskatchewan CCF (1935–1961); CCF-NDP (1961–1967)
- Headquarters: 1122 Saskatchewan Drive; Regina, Saskatchewan; S4P 0C4
- Membership: ▼7,294 (2022)
- Ideology: Social democracy
- Political position: Centre-left
- National affiliation: New Democratic Party
- Colours: Orange
- Seats in Legislature: 26 / 61

Website
- Official website

The Saskatchewan New Democratic Party (Saskatchewan NDP or Sask NDP), branded as the Saskatchewan New Democrats, is a social democratic political party in Saskatchewan, Canada. The party was founded in 1932 as the Farmer-Labour Group and was known as the Saskatchewan section of the Co-operative Commonwealth Federation (CCF) from 1935 until 1967. While the party is affiliated with the federal New Democratic Party, the Saskatchewan NDP is considered a "distinctly homegrown" party given the role of the province in its development and the party's history in the province.

The party currently forms the Official Opposition and is led by Carla Beck.

The CCF emerged as a dominant force in provincial politics under the leadership of Tommy Douglas, forming five consecutive majority governments from 1944 through 1964. The first social democratic government elected in Canada, the CCF created a wide range of crown corporations, normalized government involvement in the economy, and pioneered elements of the modern Canadian welfare state, most notably universal healthcare. With the NDP forming government again from 1971 to 1982 and from 1991 to 2007, the party was long considered Saskatchewan's natural governing party. Moreover, Saskatchewan was long seen as the regional centre for CCF and NDP politics on the national stage. However, the party saw its influence diminish after losing government in 2007, posting its weakest election results since the party's earliest days in the 1930s.

== History ==
=== The Co-operative Commonwealth Federation ===
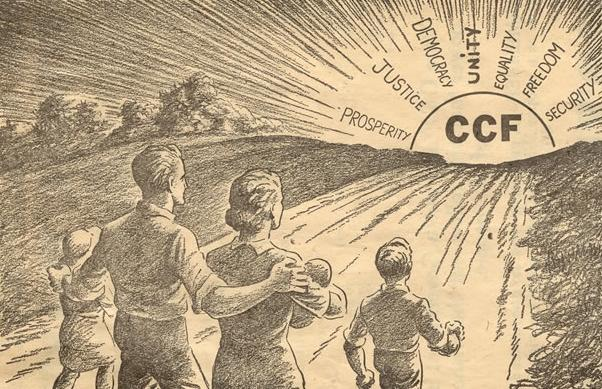
"Towards the Dawn!" – A 1930s promotional image for the Saskatchewan CCF

==== Precursors ====
The CCF can trace its roots to early farmers' organizations and political movements in the early twentieth century. In 1901, a group of farmers agreed to create the Territorial Grain Growers' Association—which became the Saskatchewan Grain Growers' Association (SGGA) when Saskatchewan became a province in 1905—to lobby for farmer's rights in the grain trade and with railways. The SGGA represented an early expression of western alienation, and took issue with an economic system that appeared to favour capitalists in central Canada. Farmers movements formed the basis of the Progressive Party, an agrarian and social democratic party that won the second most seats in the 1921 federal election, including 15 of Saskatchewan's 16 seats. United Farmers parties rose to power in Alberta and Manitoba, but the political aspirations of farmers in Saskatchewan at the provincial level were largely bound together with the provincial Liberal Party, which dominated provincial politics and carefully maintained a close relationship with the SGGA. The provincial Progressives managed to win only a handful of seats throughout the 1920s, while the American-inspired agrarian Non-Partisan League failed to win any. Organized labour, meanwhile, existed in the province but, largely dependent on the expanding agricultural economy, tended to find itself following the lead of farmers.

In 1921, a left-wing splinter group, unhappy with the SGGA association with the Liberals, left the association to form the Farmer's Union of Canada. The groups would reconcile in forming the Wheat Pool producers' cooperative, and merged in 1926 to form the United Farmers of Canada (UFC) under the leadership of George Hara Williams. The new group was opposed to participating in electoral politics and favoured cooperative development, while building a closer relationship with organized labour. However, when a handful of Progressive MLAs opted to prop up a Conservative government after the 1929 election, the UFC was pushed further towards political participation.

==== Founding and Opposition (1932–1944) ====
The other major factor in pushing the UFC towards political participation was the onset of the Great Depression, which was particularly severe on the Prairies. The apparent unwillingness of the dominant political parties to respond to the crisis created a renewed climate for political engagement and in particular for criticism of the political and economic system. The UFC decided to formalize itself as a socialist political alternative. In June 1931, the UFC participated in a march on Regina to protest against government indifference to the farmer's plight during the Depression. During the event, the UFC connected with M.J. Coldwell, the leader of the Independent Labour Party. In 1932, the groups agreed to merge and form the Farmer-Labour Group, or Farmer-Labour Party, with Coldwell as leader and Williams as honorary president. The same year, Farmer-Labour participated in the founding conference of the Co-operative Commonwealth Federation in Calgary, a new national party under the banner of "Farmer-Labour-Socialist", which had a significant social gospel influence. Although it was a founding member and affiliate, the Saskatchewan party opted to maintain the Farmer-Labour name ahead of its first election. At the national party's first convention in Regina in 1933, it adopted the Regina Manifesto as its statement of principles, calling for a "full programme of socialized planning" to replace capitalism.

In the same year, two Progressive MLAs, Jacob Benson and E. S. Whatley, joined the party, although they kept their commitment to Anderson's government. Farmer-Labour first participated in the 1934 provincial election and won five seats, becoming the Official Opposition to the Liberals, who returned to government with a large majority. In 1935, the party officially adopted the CCF name and separated from the UFC. Following a brief standoff between co-founders, Coldwell ran for federal office with the CCF in the 1935 federal election and was elected; George Williams took over as House and de-facto party leader. Williams was seen by moderates as too radical; while the party doubled its seat count in the 1938 election and maintained its place as the Opposition, its popular support was actually lower than in 1934. In 1939, Williams' unwavering support for the war also alienated pacifists, one of whom, Carlyle King, unsuccessfully challenged Williams for the party presidency the following year. Tommy Douglas, a charismatic federal CCF MP and baptist minister, was persuaded to challenge Williams for the leadership and succeeded in defeating him for the party presidency in 1941 and for the party leadership in 1942. In the early 1940s, the party focused intently on grassroots engagement and political education, and party membership expanded accordingly, growing from approximately 4,000 at the outset of the war to approximately 24,000 by 1944.

==== Majority government (1944–1964) ====
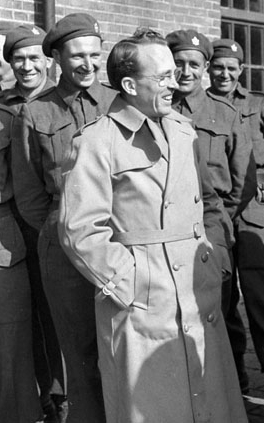
Tommy Douglas led the CCF from 1942–1962 and led the party to victory in the 1944 provincial election.

Douglas and the CCF swept to power In the 1944 election, winning 47 of 52 seats to form the first socialist government in Canada or the United States. Despite the fact that the province saw tens of thousands of residents move away during the Depression, the province remained the third most populous in the country; it was also the most indebted, and it remained predominantly rural. The party was elected on a highly detailed platform focusing on socialized health services and educational reform. From the outset, the Douglas government demonstrated a commitment to promoting public, cooperative, and private enterprise as it embarked on an ambitious modernizing program. The new government immediately enacted extensive reforms: in its first sixteen months in office, it passed 192 bills, created numerous new government departments and crown corporations as it expanded the role of the state in the provincial economy—including in the realms of insurance (SGI), utilities (SPC), and transportation (STC)—and approved new labour relations, public service, and farm security acts. The government also pursued some ill-fated business adventures, including shoe, box, and brick factories. In 1947 the government approved the Saskatchewan Bill of Rights, the first of its kind in Canada. The party also pursued modern infrastructure development, building thousands of kilometres of new roads, connecting towns, villages, and farms to a provincial electrical grid, and bringing other modern amenities like natural gas, sewage, and water hook-ups. Overall, the government placed a heavy emphasis on improving the quality of life of Saskatchewan residents, and on ensuring equal access to high standards of welfare, education, and health services.

To manage and pay for these kinds of innovations, the Douglas government placed a heavy emphasis on a robust and professional civil service. Douglas personally recruited George Cadbury from England to lead an influential economic planning advisory board. The CCF placed an increasing emphasis on economic diversification through resource development, which it pursued mainly through promoting private industry; but the party's insistence that any such development be in the public interest led to a royalty structure that provided massive revenues from oil, natural gas, and mineral production. As a result, the government managed to achieve surplus budgets throughout much of the 1950s, providing a stronger economic base from which to further expand its welfare state. The CCF was re-elected to majority governments in 1948, 1952, 1956, and 1960.

Arguably, the party's most significant accomplishment was the introduction of North America's first comprehensive system of public medical insurance. The fight to introduce Medicare in the province was intense due to the opposition of the province's doctors, who were backed by the American Medical Association. The AMA feared that public healthcare would spread to other parts of the continent if introduced in one part. In July 1962 the doctors staged the 23-day Saskatchewan doctors' strike. Despite a concerted attempt to defeat the controversial Medical Care Insurance Act, the strike eventually collapsed and the College of Physicians and Surgeons of Saskatchewan agreed to the alterations and terms of the "Saskatoon Agreement". The program was introduced and was soon adopted across Canada.

After doing much of the preliminary work on Medicare, Douglas resigned as party leader and premier in 1961 to become the founding leader of the federal New Democratic Party (NDP), which was formed by a merger of the CCF and the Canadian Labour Congress. Woodrow Lloyd, a key Douglas cabinet minister, succeeded him as party leader and premier, and completed the implementation of Medicare. With the creation of the NDP, the Saskatchewan CCF became the Co-operative Commonwealth Federation, Saskatchewan Section of the New Democratic Party, or CCF-NDP. This was the name under which the party contested the 1964 election. By then, the fight over Medicare had taken a particular toll, and the CCF-NDP were defeated by Ross Thatcher's Liberals.

=== Saskatchewan NDP ===
==== In transition (1964–1971) ====
At its convention in November 1967, the party fully adopted the NDP name. The change was controversial, in part because it broke with a rich tradition, and also because the merger with organized labour that it represented raised concerns that the party was abandoning its agrarian roots. This came at a time of increasing rural depopulation as the trend of farm consolidation was gaining greater momentum. Moreover, beginning in the late 1960s, the NDP—provincially and nationally—became gripped with a factional dispute with a growing left-wing movement called "The Waffle". Largely an expression of the "New Left", part of the 1960s counterculture movement, the Waffle advocated for a return to the party's socialist roots, including through the nationalization of key industries; it was particularly concerned with American control of the Canadian economy. The Waffle was contentious. Its Manifesto for an Independent Socialist Canada was defeated in a vote at the 1969 federal NDP convention. However, one person who voted in support was Woodrow Lloyd, who saw its potential for revitalizing the party. The episode, and resistance to Lloyd's willingness to open the party to debate, contributed to Lloyd's decision to resign as leader in 1970.

Lloyd's resignation triggered a contentious leadership race featuring Allan Blakeney, a former civil servant and cabinet minister in the Douglas and Lloyd governments; Roy Romanow, a young lawyer who had joined the caucus in 1967 and was considered a more right-wing candidate; Don Mitchell, a farmer and Waffle candidate; and George Taylor, who was considered a labour candidate. At the 1970 convention, Mitchell had a strong showing, finishing third with more than 25% of the vote. On the final ballot, Blakeney defeated Romanow, with many Waffle members abstaining. However, despite losing the leadership, party policy at the convention was greatly influenced by the Waffle.

==== Allan Blakeney (1971–1987) ====
Under Blakeney, the NDP returned to power with a strong majority in the 1971 election on a platform entitled the "New Deal for People". The platform promised greater government intervention in the economy and a focus on equitable social programming, along with support for organized labour. The arrival of the 1970s energy crisis, which rapidly increased energy commodity prices, including for oil and uranium, provided the prospect of windfall resource profits, while also precipitating a series of confrontations between the province, industry, and the federal government over the control of and revenues from resources. Saskatchewan embarked on a programme of nationalizing the province's natural resources, including the creation of SaskOil—a central campaign of the Saskatchewan Waffle—PotashCorp, and the Saskatchewan Mining Development Corporation, in order to secure significant resource revenue. The NDP, with Romanow as attorney general, also went to court with the federal government over resource taxation, and joined with Alberta in its opposition to the federal National Energy Program, which exacerbated a new wave of western alienation sentiment. These developments were not without controversy; uranium development in particular proved contentious within the NDP as environmental and peace activists favoured a moratorium on the resource. However, the Blakeney government also created a Department of the Environment, introduced environmental assessment standards, and held public inquiries into resource projects. The NDP also introduced progressive reforms to taxation and labour law, and expanded healthcare programs including new prescription drug and dental plans. The NDP was re-elected to majority governments in 1975 and 1979.

Blakeney and the NDP were also governing during the Patriation of the Canadian Constitution in the early 1980s, which became a major focus of Blakeney's. Alongside Alberta Premier Peter Lougheed, Blakeney negotiated the recognition of provincial rights over natural resources, which were enshrined in Section 92A of the Constitution. Moreover, Blakeney was instrumental to the development of Section 33 of the Charter of Rights and Freedoms, which enshrined the notwithstanding clause. The clause enables provinces to override sections of the Charter. Blakeney argued that it was an important check on appointed courts by democratically elected governments; while courts could rule on certain legal rights, they had less purview to rule on moral rights—such as the right to healthcare—that can only be enacted and enforced by governments. In essence, Blakeney asserted that certain rights should not be given precedence over others because they were included in the Charter.

Blakeney's government was defeated in the 1982 election by the resurgent Progressive Conservatives led by Grant Devine. The loss has been attributed to a variety of factors, including public fatigue with constitutional matters, a loss of union support over NDP support for federal wage and price controls and conflicts with organized labour late in its term, and PC promises to provide tax and interest relief. The NDP was reduced to nine seats in the worst defeat a sitting CCF/NDP government had suffered in Saskatchewan. Despite the defeat, Blakeney continued to lead the NDP in Opposition. In the 1986 election, the NDP narrowly won the popular vote, but the concentration of that vote in urban centres translated to only 25 seats. Winning just nine seats outside of Regina and Saskatoon, the election emphasized how much had changed for a party that had begun as a voice for rural discontent. Devine's government, on the other hand, was rural-focused, and spent lavishly on supporting farmers in particular.

==== Roy Romanow & Lorne Calvert (1987–2009) ====
Blakeney resigned in early 1987 and Roy Romanow was acclaimed as the new leader. Romanow would led the party back to power in 1991, when the NDP inherited a fiscal crisis. Provincial debt had soared under the Devine government, to the point that the province was facing the prospect of bankruptcy. Moreover, the PC government's privatization of a range of crown corporations, including PotashCorp, constrained government revenue. Romanow appealed to the standard of fiscal management set by the Douglas government to emphasize the need to prioritize the fiscal crisis. However, he and finance minister Janice MacKinnon adopted an austerity approach to dealing with the crisis, which stabilized the province's finances, returning to a balanced budget by 1995, but at a cost. Spending cuts included downsizing rural healthcare and schooling as well as agricultural support, further entrenching the growing urban-rural divide in provincial politics. Moreover, the embrace of neoliberal "third way" politics by the NDP was controversial within the party, alienating those who felt it was a betrayal of the party's roots and core ideology, and who would have preferred a renewed program of nationalization to increase revenues. One faction even left the party to help found the New Green Alliance, which later became the Saskatchewan Green Party.

After the NDP was re-elected in 1995, neither the PCs nor the Liberal Opposition saw a clear path back to power. In 1997, four MLAs from each party—all representing rural districts—joined together to announce the founding of the Saskatchewan Party in an attempt to unite opposition to the NDP. Former Reform Party MP Elwin Hermanson was chosen as its leader, and with eight MLAs the party immediately formed the Official Opposition. Running on a platform of tax cuts and social conservative policies, Hermanson's party had a strong 1999 election performance, narrowly edging out the NDP in the popular vote; however, the new party failed to make inroads in urban centres, and won 25 seats compared to 29 for the NDP, who nearly swept the seats in Regina and Saskatoon. The NDP's 29 seats were one shy of a majority, and the party was forced to rely on the support of three elected Liberal MLAs to form government.

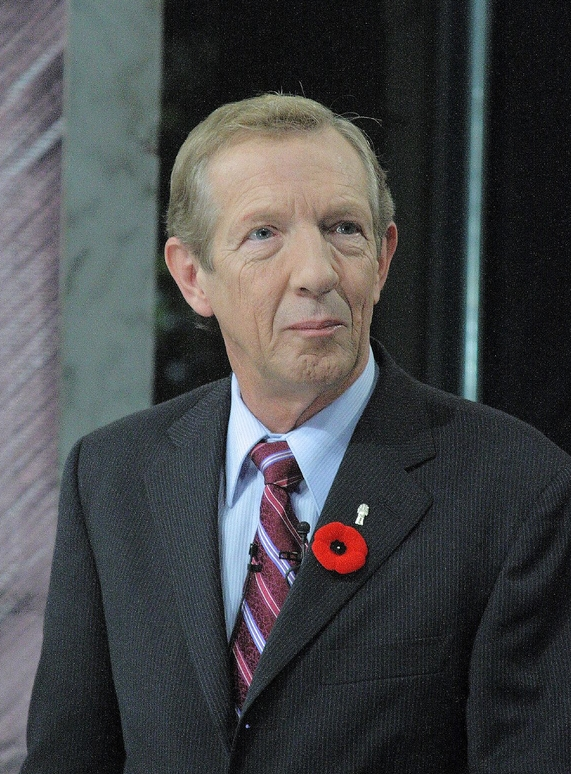
Lorne Calvert led the NDP from 2001–2009 and served as Premier from 2001–2007.

In 2000, Romanow announced that he would be retiring; this set off a leadership race that differed from 1987, when Romanow was unchallenged for the leadership. The 2001 leadership election was highly contested—the seven candidates on the ballot made it the biggest in the party's history. Moreover, for the first time the party employed a one member, one vote policy, rather than a delegated election. The perceived front runner was Chris Axworthy, a former NDP MP and current MLA who was serving as justice minister under Romanow. Three other sitting cabinet ministers also ran in Buckley Belanger, Joanne Crofford, and Maynard Sonntag. They were joined by former MLA and United Church minister Lorne Calvert, former National Farmers Union president Nettie Wiebe, and Scott Banda, who had once served as president of the Young New Democrats. Wiebe ran an explicitly anti-neoliberal campaign, advocating for a leftward shift for the party; Wiebe ultimately finished third with 23% on the third ballot. Calvert, who ran a more traditional social democratic campaign, promising a greater focus on social programs, defeated Axworthy on the final ballot with 58% of nearly 18,000 votes.

With the victory, Calvert immediately succeeded Romanow as premier. Although his government did not represent a radical departure for the NDP, it was, as promised, considered more social democratic than Romanow's. Calvert's government significantly increased social spending, particularly in education and healthcare. It expanded child care spaces and introduced a number of targeted welfare programs. The government also began reforming immigration systems to attract more immigrants, and expanded investment in renewable energy and energy conservation. Much of this new social spending was made possible by a renewed boom in commodity prices, which led to significant increases in resource revenue for the province. Calvert also purposefully drew a stark contrast between his party's support for the province's major remaining crown corporations and Hermanson's party's willingness to consider further privatization. While the Saskatchewan Party led polling heading into the 2003 general election and managed to increase its seat count to 28, the NDP increased its vote share and captured 30 seats to return to a majority government.

After the election, Hermanson resigned as Saskatchewan Party leader and was replaced by Brad Wall. The new leader made a concerted effort to moderate the Opposition's image, shifting away from social conservative policies and arguing that it was the best party to manage the booming economy. Importantly, Wall made a commitment not to privatize crowns and promised a continued focus on healthcare. Wall led the Saskatchewan Party to victory in the 2007 general election, ending a long tenure by the NDP. After the election, Calvert said he had no immediate plans to step down as leader, but was unlikely to lead the party into the next election.

==== In opposition (2009–present) ====
In 2008, Calvert announced his intention to retire. The ensuing leadership race included former deputy premier Dwain Lingenfelter, Moose Jaw MLA Deb Higgins, former party president and Regina lawyer Yens Pedersen, and Saskatoon doctor Ryan Meili. Lingenfelter was elected party leader June 6, 2009, with Meili's outsider campaign finishing in second with 45% of votes. Lingenfelter led the party into the 2011 election, which proved to be its worst showing in 30 years, with the party reduced to nine seats as Wall's Saskatchewan Party secured a large majority. Lingenfelter failed to secure his own Regina seat—a first for a NDP leader—and announced his resignation after the election, triggering another leadership race.

Meili again entered the leadership race and was joined by two MLAs—Trent Wotherspoon and Cam Broten—and former federal NDP candidate Erin Weir. On March 9, 2013, Broten was narrowly elected leader, defeating Meili by 44 votes. Broten fared little better than Lingenfelter. In the 2016 election, the party won ten seats, and Broten became the second straight party leader to lose their own seat. Broten resigned, triggering a third party leadership race in less than a decade. The election, which took place on March 3, 2018, came down to a contest between former contenders Meili—now a sitting MLA—and Wotherspoon, who had finished second and third, respectively, in 2013. Meili, in his third bid for party leadership, was chosen leader with 55% of the vote.

Throughout the COVID-19 pandemic—during which Meili renewed his medical license to work at testing facilities—the NDP persistently called for the implementation of more public health measures than the governing Saskatchewan Party, now under the leadership of Scott Moe, was implementing; the province was one of the hardest hit by the pandemic in Canada. The 2020 provincial election was held during the pandemic. In the election, the NDP won 13 seats while the Saskatchewan Party won its fourth consecutive majority government. Meili won his seat and vowed to stay on as leader. However, Meili received just 72% support at the party's 2021 convention leadership review, and days after the NDP lost a February 2022 by-election in the northern Athabasca district, Meili announced that he would be resigning as party leader. The ensuing leadership race saw Regina MLA Carla Beck defeat Saskatoon lawyer Kaitlyn Harvey—Beck became the first elected female leader of the party, and its fourth leader since Calvert retired in 2009. The leadership election revealed that party membership had decreased substantially since the last race; while more than 13,000 members were eligible to vote in 2018, just over 7,000 were eligible in 2022, with fewer than 5,000 casting ballots.

===== Carla Beck =====
Under Beck's leadership, the party began to see a resurgence in popular support. Ahead of the 2024 provincial election, polls showed the NDP leading the Saskatchewan Party as they waged a campaign focusing on healthcare, education, and the cost of living. The party went on to post its best results since 2003 and more than doubled its seat count compared to 2020—this included winning all but one seat in Regina and Saskatoon, with the only loss in those urban centres coming by a margin of fewer than 150 votes. However, the party failed to win any rural seats outside of the far north of the province, or to break through in smaller urban centres, which kept the party in Opposition, albeit the province's largest in nearly two decades.

== Ideology ==
The Saskatchewan NDP has undergone a series of ideological transformations over the course of its history, dating back to its days as the CCF. It has also been subject to factional disputes. Overall, what began as an explicitly socialist party in the 1930s had by the turn of the twenty-first century become a more centrist, "third way" social democratic party.

The first national CCF convention in 1933 resulted in the Regina Manifesto, named after the city in which it was presented. While it has been noted that the manifesto broke somewhat from the socialist tradition in favouring a national over an international outlook, the manifesto ended with the statement that "no CCF Government will rest content until it has eradicated capitalism", advocating for a "full programme of socialized planning". However, almost immediately the party demonstrated a willingness to work with other parties and to moderate its platform in its quest for electoral success, and early CCF governments tended to be labeled "democratic socialist". These CCF governments were also considered populist in nature, which at times tempered its socialist outlook.

The first significant moderation to the overarching CCF platform came with the 1956 Winnipeg Declaration, which downplayed socialism in embracing a mixed-economy model, which the party had done in practice in Saskatchewan since forming government. By the late 1960s, the party at all levels became gripped by a factional dispute with the Waffle Movement, which consisted of NDP members advocating for a return to the party's socialist roots, with a greater role for state planning and nationalization of industry. The Waffle was well supported in Saskatchewan—the movement's candidate for the 1971 provincial party leadership election finished in third with over 25% of the vote—but was ultimately defeated by the party establishment.

The 1990s brought about a rightward shift in NDP policy under the leadership of Roy Romanow. During that decade, the party embraced "third way" politics, a form of neoliberalism that favours a reduced role for the state in the economy. By the first decade of the twenty-first century, observers noted that the province's main parties—the NDP and the Saskatchewan Party, a relatively new conservative party—were "crowding the centre", with a broad consensus favouring neoliberal approaches to more traditional social democratic approaches. This shift was divisive within the party, seen by parts of the party as a betrayal of its core principles.

In recent years, more left-wing candidates have struggled to gain influence in the party. Ryan Meili, who was seen as left-leaning, took three tries to win the party leadership, and resigned amid rumours that the party favoured a more centrist orientation. In the last leadership race, Carla Beck defeated Kaitlyn Harvey, who was perceived as a left-wing challenger. In March 2026, Beck distanced herself from the newly-elected federal NDP leader Avi Lewis due to his "ideological and unrealistic" stances on natural resource development.

== Party leaders ==
† denotes acting or interim leader

#	Party Leader	Highest Position	Tenure	Notes
1	Major James Coldwell	Party Leader	July 27, 1932 – July 17, 1936	Elected as a federal MP in 1935; became federal CCF leader in 1942.
2	George Hara Williams	Leader of the Opposition	July 17, 1936 – February 12, 1941	Also acting leader, 1934–1936.
†	John Brockelbank	Leader of the Opposition	February 12, 1941 – July 17, 1942	Leader in the legislature, 1942–1944.
3	Tommy Douglas	Premier	July 17, 1942 – November 3, 1961	First democratic socialist Premier in Canada; resigned after becoming federal NDP leader in 1961.
4	Woodrow Lloyd	Premier	November 3, 1961 – July 4, 1970	Party renamed CCF-NDP in 1964 and NDP in 1967.
5	Allan Blakeney	Premier	July 4, 1970 – November 7, 1987	
6	Roy Romanow	Premier	November 7, 1987 – January 27, 2001	
7	Lorne Calvert	Premier	January 27, 2001 – June 6, 2009	
8	Dwain Lingenfelter	Leader of the Opposition	June 6, 2009 – November 19, 2011	
†	John Nilson	Leader of the Opposition	November 19, 2011 – March 9, 2013	
9	Cam Broten	Leader of the Opposition	March 9, 2013 – April 23, 2016	
†	Trent Wotherspoon	Leader of the Opposition	April 12, 2016 – June 20, 2017	Resigned as interim leader in order to pursue the leadership.
†	Nicole Sarauer	Leader of the Opposition	June 20, 2017 – March 3, 2018	
10	Ryan Meili	Leader of the Opposition	March 3, 2018 – June 26, 2022	
11	Carla Beck	Leader of the Opposition	June 26, 2022 – present	First elected female leader of the Saskatchewan NDP.

== Election results ==
=== Legislative Assembly ===
Election	Leader	Votes	%	Seats	+/−	Position	Status
1934	Major James Coldwell	102,944	24.0	5 / 55	▲5	▲2nd	Opposition
1938	George Hara Williams	82,529	18.7	10 / 52	▲5	2nd	Opposition
1944	Tommy Douglas	211,364	53.1	47 / 52	▲37	▲1st	Majority
1948	Tommy Douglas	236,900	47.6	31 / 52	▼16	1st	Majority
1952	Tommy Douglas	291,705	54.1	42 / 53	▲11	1st	Majority
1956	Tommy Douglas	249,634	45.3	36 / 53	▼6	1st	Majority
1960	Tommy Douglas	276,846	40.8	37 / 54	▲1	1st	Majority
1964	Woodrow Lloyd	268,742	40.3	26 / 59	▼11	▼2nd	Opposition
1967	Woodrow Lloyd	188,653	44.3	24 / 59	▼2	2nd	Opposition
1971	Allan Blakeney	248,978	55.0	45 / 60	▲21	▲1st	Majority
1975	Allan Blakeney	180,700	40.1	39 / 61	▼6	1st	Majority
1978	Allan Blakeney	228,791	48.1	44 / 61	▲5	1st	Majority
1982	Allan Blakeney	201,390	37.6	9 / 64	▼35	▼2nd	Opposition
1986	Allan Blakeney	247,683	45.2	25 / 64	▲16	2nd	Opposition
1991	Roy Romanow	275,780	51.0	55 / 66	▲30	▲1st	Majority
1995	Roy Romanow	193,053	47.2	42 / 58	▼13	1st	Majority
1999	Roy Romanow	157,046	38.7	29 / 58	▼13	1st	Minority
2003	Lorne Calvert	190,923	44.6	30 / 58	▲1	1st	Majority
2007	Lorne Calvert	168,704	37.2	20 / 58	▼10	▼2nd	Opposition
2011	Dwain Lingenfelter	128,673	32.0	9 / 58	▼11	2nd	Opposition
2016	Cam Broten	129,528	30.4	10 / 61	▲1	2nd	Opposition
2020	Ryan Meili	140,584	31.6	13 / 61	▲3	2nd	Opposition
2024	Carla Beck	188,373	40.4	27 / 61	▲14	2nd	Opposition

== Current Saskatchewan NDP MLAs ==
Member	District	Elected	Notes
Carla Beck	Regina Lakeview	2016	Party leader and Leader of the Official Opposition, 2022–present.
Brent Blakley	Regina Wascana Plains	2024	
Bhajan Brar	Regina Pasqua	2024	
Kim Breckner	Saskatoon Riversdale	2024	
Noor Burki	Regina Coronation Park	2023	
April ChiefCalf	Saskatoon Westview	2024	
Jared Clarke	Regina Walsh Acres	2023	
Meara Conway	Regina Elphinstone-Centre	2020	
Hugh Gordon	Saskatoon Silverspring	2024	
Tajinder Grewal	Saskatoon University-Sutherland	2024	
Sally Housser	Regina University	2024	
Keith Jorgenson	Saskatoon Churchill-Wildwood	2024	
Leroy Laliberte	Athabasca	2024	
Matt Love	Saskatoon Eastview	2020	
Don McBean	Saskatoon Chief Mistawasis	2024	
Jordan McPhail	Cumberland	2024	
Vicki Mowat	Saskatoon Fairview	2017	
Joan Pratchler	Regina Rochdale	2024	
Erika Ritchie	Saskatoon Nutana	2020	
Jacqueline Roy	Regina Northeast	2024	
Nicole Sarauer	Regina Douglas Park	2016	Interim party leader and Leader of the Opposition, 2017–2018.
Brittney Senger	Saskatoon Southeast	2024	
Nathaniel Teed	Saskatoon Meewasin	2022	First openly gay MLA in Saskatchewan history.
Darcy Warrington	Saskatoon Stonebridge	2024	
Trent Wotherspoon	Regina Rosemont	2007	Interim party leader and Leader of the Opposition, 2016–2017.
Aleana Young	Regina South Albert	2020	

== See also ==
- List Saskatchewan CCF/NDP members
- Saskatchewan CCF/NDP leadership elections
- List of political parties in Saskatchewan
- Politics of Saskatchewan

== Bibliography ==
- Conway, John F. (2014). The Rise of the New West: The History of a Region in Confederation. Toronto: James Lorimer & Company. ISBN 978-1-4594-0624-7.
- Eisler, Dale (2022). From Left to Right: Saskatchewan's Political and Economic Transformation. Regina: University of Regina Press. ISBN 9780889778672.
- Harding, Jim (1995). "The Burdens and Benefits of Growth: Mineral Resource Revenues and Heritage Fund Allocations under the Saskatchewan NDP, 1971–82". In Harding, Jim (ed.). Social Policy and Social Justice: The NDP Government in Saskatchewan During the Blakeney Years. Waterloo, Ontario: Wilfrid Laurier University Press. pp. 341–374. ISBN 978-0-88920-240-5.
- Jaffe, JoAnn; Elliott, Patricia W.; Sellers, Cora, eds. (2021). Divided: Populism, Polarization and Power in the New Saskatchewan. Halifax & Winnipeg: Fernwood Publishing. ISBN 9781773634807.
- Larmour, Jean (1984). "The Douglas Government's Changing Emphasis on Public, Private, and Co-operative Development in Saskatchewan, 1944-1961". In Brennan, J. William (ed.). "Building the Co-operative Commonwealth": Essays on the Democratic Socialist Tradition in Canada. Regina: Canadian Plains Research Centre. pp. 161–180. ISBN 0-88977-031-X.
- Leeson, Howard, ed. (2008). Saskatchewan Politics: Crowding the Centre. Regina: Canadian Plains Research Centre. ISBN 9780889772342.
- McGrane, David (2008). "Which Third Way? A Comparison of the Romanow and Calvert NDP Governments from 1991 to 2007". In Leeson, Howard A. (ed.). Saskatchewan Politics: Crowding the Centre. Regina: Canadian Plains Research Centre. pp. 143–163. ISBN 9780889772342.
- Praud, Jocelyne; McQuarrie, Sarah (2001). "The Saskatchewan CCF-NDP from the Regina Manifesto to the Romanow Years". In Leeson, Howard A. (ed.). Saskatchewan Politics: Into the Twenty-First Century. Regina, Saskatchewan: Canadian Plains Research Center. pp. 143–167. ISBN 978-0-88977-131-4.
- Socknat, Thomas P. (1984). "The Pacifist Background of the Early CCF". In Brennan, J. William (ed.). "Building the Co-operative Commonwealth": Essays on the Democratic Socialist Tradition in Canada. Regina: Canadian Plains Research Centre. pp. 57–67. ISBN 0-88977-031-X.
- Taylor, Georgina M. (1991). "Saskatchewan". In Heaps, Leo (ed.). Our Canada. Toronto: James Lorimer & Company. pp. 117–126. ISBN 978-1-55028-355-6.
- Waiser, Bill (2005). Saskatchewan: A New History. Calgary: Fifth House. ISBN 9781894856492.
- Warnock, John W. (2004). Saskatchewan: The Roots of Discontent and Protest. Montréal: Black Rose Books. ISBN 1-55164-244-1.
