= 2016 Saskatchewan general election =

Canadian provincial election

- April 4, 2016

61 seats in the Legislative Assembly of Saskatchewan 31 seats needed for a majority
- Turnout: 57.8% (▼8.9pp)
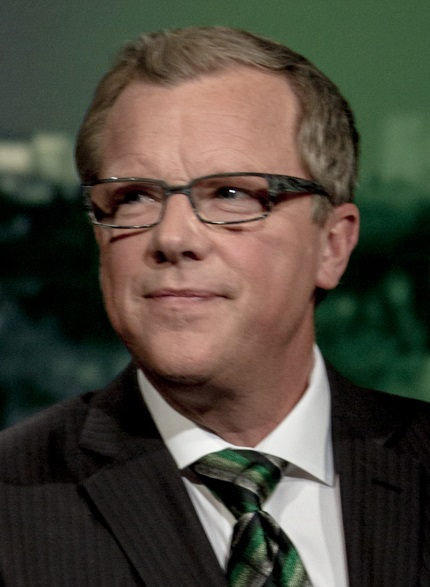

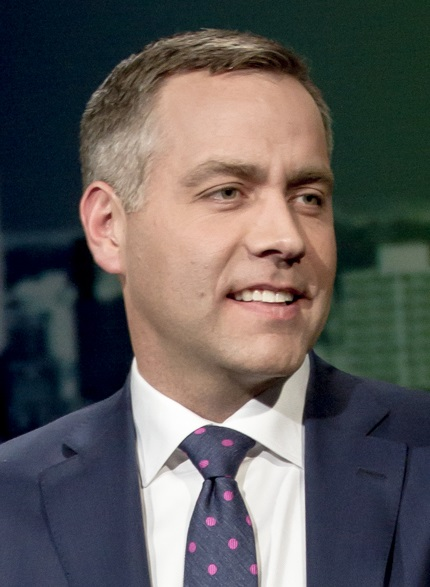
	First party	Second party
Leader	Brad Wall	Cam Broten
Party	Saskatchewan	New Democratic
Leader since	March 15, 2004	March 9, 2013
Leader's seat	Swift Current	Saskatoon; Massey Place (ran in Saskatoon Westview; lost)
Last election	49 seats, 64.25%	9 seats, 31.97%
Seats before	47	9
Seats won	51	10
Seat change	▲4	▲1
Popular vote	270,776	131,137
Percentage	62.53%	30.28%
Swing	▼1.72pp	▼1.69pp
- Popular vote by riding. As this is an FPTP election, seat totals are not determined by popular vote, but instead via results by each riding. Riding names are listed at the bottom of the map.
Premier before election
Brad Wall
Saskatchewan
Premier after election
Brad Wall
Saskatchewan

The 2016 Saskatchewan general election, was held on April 4, 2016, to elect members of the Legislative Assembly of Saskatchewan. The Lieutenant Governor dissolved the Legislature on March 8, 2016, setting the election date for April 4.

The election resulted in the Saskatchewan Party winning its third majority government. This is the first time in 90 years that a party other than the Saskatchewan New Democratic Party (NDP) or its predecessor, the Saskatchewan Co-operative Commonwealth Federation (CCF) has won three consecutive majority governments in Saskatchewan. It is also the first time that a centre-right party has won three consecutive elections in the province.

== Date ==
Under The Legislative Assembly Act, 2007 (Saskatchewan), the election "must be held" on the first Monday of November in the fourth calendar year following the previous election. As the last election was held in 2011, that date would be November 2, 2015. However, the act also provides that if the election period would overlap with a federal election period, the provincial election is to be postponed until the first Monday of the following April. Under the federal fixed-term act, the 42nd general election occurred on October 19, 2015, overlapping election periods by approximately two weeks. Because the federal Conservatives called the election on August 2, 2015 for October 19, the Saskatchewan election was held on April 4, 2016, even though the Lieutenant Governor retained the power to dissolve the Legislative Assembly early on the Premier's advice.

== Redistribution of electoral districts ==
An Act of the Saskatchewan Legislature increased the number of seats from 58 to 61. The following changes were made:

Abolished	New
Renaming of districts
Martensville	Martensville-Warman
Regina Dewdney	Regina Gardiner Park
Regina Qu'Appelle Valley	Regina Rochdale
Saskatoon Massey Place	Saskatoon Westview
Abolished districts
Regina South	
Drawn from other districts
	Regina Pasqua (Note: From parts of Regina South, Regina Lakeview, Regina Rosemont and Regina Qu'Appelle Valley.)
	Regina University (Note: From parts of Regina South, Regina Douglas Park and Regina Wascana Plains.)
	Saskatoon Stonebridge-Dakota (Note: From Saskatoon Southeast.)
Reorganization of districts
Arm River-Watrous; Biggar; Humboldt; Thunder Creek	Arm River; Biggar-Sask Valley; Humboldt-Watrous; Lumsden-Morse
Saskatoon Greystone; Saskatoon Silver Springs; Saskatoon Sutherland	Saskatoon Churchill-Wildwood; Saskatoon Silverspring-Sutherland; Saskatoon University; Saskatoon Willowgrove

== Results ==
Due to an increase in the number of ridings (from 58 to 61), both parties increased their total number of seats.

The Saskatchewan Party maintained its sweep of the southern and central rural ridings, and also held on to a majority of seats in Regina and Saskatoon. The NDP seemed to have some momentum after winning federal seats for the first time in a decade at the 2015 federal election. However, it was unable to recover much of the ground it lost in its severe defeat of almost five years earlier. The NDP gained one seat each in Regina and Prince Albert but lost one in Saskatoon for an overall net gain of one seat, and for the second consecutive election saw its leader unseated in his own riding; Cam Broten was defeated in the reconfigured riding of Saskatoon Westview by a slim margin of 232 votes. The results reflected the opinion polling done prior to the election, with the popular vote falling within the margins of error, though the Saskatchewan Party won more seats than what was projected.

=== Election summary ===
Summary of the April 4, 2016 Saskatchewan Legislature election
Party	Leader	Candidates	Seats				Popular vote		
Party	Leader	Candidates	2011	Dissol.	2016	+/-	Votes	%	% change
Saskatchewan	Brad Wall	61	49	47	51	+2	270,776	62.53%	-1.72
New Democratic	Cam Broten	61	9	9	10	+1	131,137	30.28%	-1.69
Liberal	Darrin Lamoureux	61	–	–	0	–	15,568	3.60%	+3.04
Green	Victor Lau	58	–	–	0	–	7,967	1.84%	-1.03
Progressive Conservative	Rick Swenson	18	–	–	0	–	5,571	1.29%	+0.96
Western Independence	Frank Serfas	4	–	–	0	–	318	+0.06%	
Independent		5	–	–	0	–	1,693	+0.38%	
Vacant			–	2	—N/a				
Total		268	58	58	61		433,030	100%	

=== Percentages ===
Popular vote
Saskatchewan	62.53%
New Democratic	30.28%
Liberal	3.60%
Others	3.59%

Seat summary
Saskatchewan	83.61%
New Democratic	16.39%

=== Synopsis of results ===
2016 Saskatchewan general election - synopsis of riding results
Riding	Winning party							Turnout (Note: including rejected and declined ballots)	Votes							
Riding	2011	1st place	Share	Share %	Margin #	Margin %	2nd place	Turnout	Sask	NDP	Lib	Grn	PC	WIP	Ind	Total
Arm River	New	Sask	6,187	73.39%	4,730	56.11%	NDP	67.33%	6,187	1,457	207	241	338	–	–	8,430
Athabasca	NDP	NDP	1,756	64.68%	1,112	40.96%	Sask	33.40%	644	1,756	262	53	–	–	–	2,715
Batoche	Sask	Sask	4,471	64.76%	2,357	34.14%	NDP	62.13%	4,471	2,114	216	103	–	–	–	6,904
Biggar-Sask Valley	New	Sask	5,972	76.75%	4,519	58.08%	NDP	60.08%	5,972	1,453	194	162	–	–	–	7,781
Cannington	Sask	Sask	6,444	84.47%	5,770	75.63%	NDP	62.44%	6,444	674	133	133	245	–	–	7,629
Canora-Pelly	Sask	Sask	4,318	67.47%	2,995	46.80%	NDP	56.76%	4,318	1,323	192	102	414	51	–	6,400
Carrot River Valley	Sask	Sask	5,104	75.96%	3,735	55.59%	NDP	56.13%	5,104	1,369	131	115	–	–	–	6,719
Cumberland	NDP	NDP	3,375	62.32%	1,765	32.59%	Sask	38.93%	1,610	3,375	352	79	–	–	–	5,416
Cut Knife-Turtleford	Sask	Sask	5,765	79.83%	4,807	66.56%	NDP	57.86%	5,765	958	255	90	154	–	–	7,222
Cypress Hills	Sask	Sask	5,774	79.50%	4,899	67.45%	NDP	60.82%	5,774	875	99	133	382	–	–	7,263
Estevan	Sask	Sask	5,454	77.86%	4,819	68.79%	NDP	58.34%	5,454	635	118	89	618	–	91	7,005
Humboldt-Watrous	New	Sask	5,818	74.54%	4,230	54.20%	NDP	63.98%	5,818	1,588	212	187	–	–	–	7,805
Indian Head-Milestone	Sask	Sask	5,118	67.36%	3,270	43.04%	NDP	58.99%	5,118	1,848	264	143	225	–	–	7,598
Kelvington-Wadena	Sask	Sask	5,133	69.98%	3,779	51.52%	NDP	61.76%	5,133	1,354	132	108	390	218	–	7,335
Kindersley	Sask	Sask	4,802	67.95%	3,553	50.28%	Ind	59.74%	4,802	522	171	–	323	–	1,249	7,067
Last Mountain-Touchwood	Sask	Sask	4,274	62.18%	2,702	39.31%	NDP	59.76%	4,274	1,572	212	104	689	23	–	6,874
Lloydminster	Sask	Sask	4,350	86.16%	3,918	77.60%	NDP	37.39%	4,350	432	202	65	–	–	–	5,049
Lumsden-Morse	New	Sask	6,256	75.08%	4,601	55.22%	NDP	64.87%	6,256	1,655	242	179	–	–	–	8,332
Martensville-Warman	Sask	Sask	6,854	79.45%	5,377	62.33%	NDP	56.43%	6,854	1,477	179	91	–	26	–	8,627
Meadow Lake	Sask	Sask	4,395	70.47%	2,965	47.54%	NDP	46.66%	4,395	1,430	305	107	–	–	–	6,237
Melfort	Sask	Sask	5,579	77.09%	4,173	57.66%	NDP	59.23%	5,579	1,406	150	102	–	–	–	7,237
Melville-Saltcoats	Sask	Sask	5,311	72.74%	3,716	50.90%	NDP	59.61%	5,311	1,595	138	–	192	–	65	7,301
Moose Jaw North	Sask	Sask	4,425	60.80%	1,908	26.22%	NDP	58.84%	4,425	2,517	194	142	–	–	–	7,278
Moose Jaw Wakamow	Sask	Sask	3,514	53.07%	695	10.50%	NDP	52.49%	3,514	2,819	182	106	–	–	–	6,621
Moosomin	Sask	Sask	5,142	72.31%	4,110	57.80%	NDP	56.71%	5,142	1,032	191	244	284	–	218	7,111
Prince Albert Carlton	Sask	Sask	3,553	54.81%	883	13.62%	NDP	51.41%	3,553	2,670	199	60	–	–	–	6,482
Prince Albert Northcote	Sask	NDP	2,752	49.12%	261	4.66%	Sask	43.37%	2,491	2,752	272	88	–	–	–	5,603
Regina Coronation Park	Sask	Sask	3,008	47.84%	147	2.34%	NDP	52.12%	3,008	2,861	245	103	–	–	70	6,287
Regina Douglas Park	Sask	NDP	3,242	49.83%	711	10.93%	Sask	54.48%	2,531	3,242	332	401	–	–	–	6,506
Regina Elphinstone-Centre	NDP	NDP	2,648	59.19%	1,297	28.99%	Sask	38.75%	1,351	2,648	297	178	–	–	–	4,474
Regina Gardiner Park	Sask	Sask	4,259	59.57%	1,800	25.17%	NDP	60.95%	4,259	2,459	294	138	–	–	–	7,150
Regina Lakeview	NDP	NDP	4,358	56.49%	1,643	21.30%	Sask	64.37%	2,715	4,358	391	251	–	–	–	7,715
Regina Northeast	Sask	Sask	3,920	54.65%	1,008	14.05%	NDP	57.81%	3,920	2,912	186	155	–	–	–	7,173
Regina Pasqua	New	Sask	3,929	44.24%	298	3.36%	NDP	58.39%	3,929	3,631	962	186	174	–	–	8,882
Regina Rochdale	Sask	Sask	5,769	59.04%	2,215	22.67%	NDP	62.05%	5,769	3,554	293	155	–	–	–	9,771
Regina Rosemont	NDP	NDP	3,994	53.95%	893	12.06%	Sask	58.57%	3,101	3,994	162	146	–	–	–	7,403
Regina University	New	Sask	3,418	48.93%	417	5.97%	NDP	64.23%	3,418	3,001	401	165	–	–	–	6,985
Regina Walsh Acres	Sask	Sask	3,575	51.30%	599	8.60%	NDP	58.58%	3,575	2,976	312	106	–	–	–	6,969
Regina Wascana Plains	Sask	Sask	6,107	65.55%	3,582	38.45%	NDP	64.82%	6,107	2,525	287	153	245	–	–	9,317
Rosetown-Elrose	Sask	Sask	5,939	77.66%	4,559	59.62%	NDP	66.83%	5,939	1,380	146	182	–	–	–	7,647
Rosthern-Shellbrook	Sask	Sask	4,724	71.59%	3,436	52.07%	NDP	57.31%	4,724	1,288	468	119	–	–	–	6,599
Saskatchewan Rivers	Sask	Sask	4,584	67.04%	2,574	37.64%	NDP	56.54%	4,584	2,010	244	–	–	–	–	6,838
Saskatoon Centre	NDP	NDP	3,005	57.08%	1,077	20.46%	Sask	43.13%	1,928	3,005	203	129	–	–	–	5,265
Saskatoon Churchill-Wildwood	New	Sask	3,978	52.59%	934	12.35%	NDP	61.42%	3,978	3,044	414	128	–	–	–	7,564
Saskatoon Eastview	Sask	Sask	4,169	53.39%	971	12.43%	NDP	62.42%	4,169	3,198	272	170	–	–	–	7,809
Saskatoon Fairview	Sask	Sask	2,951	48.24%	182	2.98%	NDP	50.06%	2,951	2,769	308	89	–	–	–	6,117
Saskatoon Meewasin	Sask	Sask	3,500	50.49%	523	7.54%	NDP	57.60%	3,500	2,977	307	148	–	–	–	6,932
Saskatoon Northwest	Sask	Sask	4,514	65.49%	2,510	36.41%	NDP	59.72%	4,514	2,004	254	121	–	–	–	6,893
Saskatoon Nutana	NDP	NDP	3,822	56.53%	1,348	19.94%	Sask	55.04%	2,474	3,822	275	190	–	–	–	6,761
Saskatoon Riversdale	NDP	NDP	2,691	48.19%	259	4.64%	Sask	47.33%	2,432	2,691	354	107	–	–	–	5,584
Saskatoon Silverspring-Sutherland	New	Sask	4,482	63.69%	2,479	35.23%	NDP	54.73%	4,482	2,003	303	127	122	–	–	7,037
Saskatoon Southeast	Sask	Sask	5,247	67.75%	3,078	39.74%	NDP	58.97%	5,247	2,169	225	104	–	–	–	7,745
Saskatoon Stonebridge-Dakota	New	Sask	6,584	69.97%	4,284	45.53%	NDP	59.90%	6,584	2,300	377	149	–	–	–	9,410
Saskatoon University	New	Sask	3,080	48.03%	348	5.43%	NDP	58.65%	3,080	2,732	370	129	101	–	–	6,412
Saskatoon Westview	NDP	Sask	3,892	49.07%	217	2.74%	NDP	55.10%	3,892	3,675	240	124	–	–	–	7,931
Saskatoon Willowgrove	New	Sask	6,603	72.11%	4,407	48.13%	NDP	59.18%	6,603	2,196	229	129	–	–	–	9,157
Swift Current	Sask	Sask	6,071	82.44%	4,959	67.34%	NDP	60.55%	6,071	1,112	78	103	–	–	–	7,364
The Battlefords	Sask	Sask	4,296	60.70%	2,036	28.77%	NDP	53.11%	4,296	2,260	438	83	–	–	–	7,077
Weyburn-Big Muddy	Sask	Sask	6,177	78.74%	4,917	62.68%	NDP	63.93%	6,177	1,260	122	155	131	–	–	7,845
Wood River	Sask	Sask	6,125	76.08%	5,134	63.77%	NDP	68.06%	6,125	991	191	200	544	–	–	8,051
Yorkton	Sask	Sask	4,585	72.56%	3,153	49.90%	NDP	51.46%	4,585	1,432	184	118	–	–	–	6,319

= Open seat
= Turnout is above provincial average
= Winning candidate was in previous Legislature
= Incumbent had switched allegiance
= Previously incumbent in another riding
= Not incumbent; was previously elected to the Legislature
= Incumbency arose from byelection gain
= Other incumbents renominated
= Multiple candidates

=== Detailed analysis ===
Elections to the 28th Legislative Assembly of Saskatchewan – top 5 candidates from each riding, by party
Party	Candidates	1st	2nd	3rd	4th	5th
Saskatchewan	61	51	10	–	–	–
New Democratic	61	10	50	1	–	–
Liberal	61	–	–	46	8	6
Green	58	–	–	4	47	5
Progressive Conservative	18	–	–	10	5	3
Western Independence	4	–	–	–	1	1
Independents	5	–	1	–	–	4

== Incumbents not contesting their seats ==
=== Retiring incumbents ===
Saskatchewan Party

- Bob Bjornerud, Melville-Saltcoats
- June Draude, Kelvington-Wadena
- Yogi Huyghebaert, Wood River
- Don Toth, Moosomin
- Ken Krawetz, Canora-Pelly
- Doreen Eagles, Estevan
- Wayne Elhard, Cypress Hills
- Russ Marchuk, Regina Douglas Park

New Democrats

- John Nilson, Regina Lakeview

=== Lost nomination election ===
Saskatchewan Party

- Bill Hutchinson, Regina South

=== Resigned before election ===
Saskatchewan Party

- Darryl Hickie, Prince Albert Carlton (Resigned March 9, 2015)
- Rob Norris, Saskatoon Greystone (Resigned Dec. 31, 2015)

== Opinion polls ==
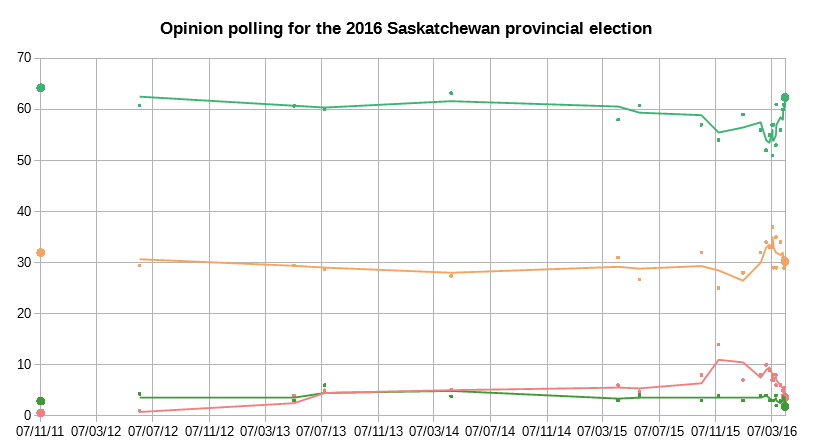
Saskatchewan NDP Liberal Green

Polling Firm	Date of Polling	Link	Saskatchewan	New Democratic	Green	Liberal	PC	Other
Forum Research	April 1–2, 2016	PDF	60.8	30.1	3.3	5.5		0.4
Insights West	March 31–April 2, 2016	HTML	61	29	4	4		
Mainstreet Research	March 31, 2016	HTML	60	31	5	4		
Insightrix	March 28–30, 2016	HTML	60	30	3	5	3	
Insights West	March 23–25, 2016	HTML	56	34	3	6		
Insightrix	March 14–16, 2016	HTML	61	29	2	6	2	0
Mainstreet Research	March 15, 2016	HTML	53	35	4	8		
Insightrix	March 8–10, 2016	HTML	57	29		7		
Mainstreet Research	March 8, 2016	HTML	51	37	3	8		
Forum Research	March 7, 2016	PDF	57	33	3	7		
Mainstreet Research	March 1, 2016	HTML	55	33	3	9		
Mainstreet Research	February 23, 2016	HTML	52	34	4	10		
Mainstreet Research	February 11, 2016	HTML	56	32	4	8		
Mainstreet Research	January 4, 2016	HTML	59	28	3	7	2	
Insightrix	November 10–12, 2015	HTML	54	25	4	14	3	
Mainstreet Research	October 6, 2015	HTML	57	32	3	8		
Oracle	May 19–25, 2015	PDF	60.8	26.7	4.1	4.8		3.7
Insightrix	April 7–9, 2015	HTML	58	31	3	6	2	
Insightrix	April 9–13, 2014	HTML	63.2	27.4	3.8	5.1	0.5	
Insightrix	July 6–13, 2013	HTML	60.1	28.7	6	5		
Insightrix	May 1–8, 2013	HTML	60.7	29.4	3	4		
Insightrix	June 4–8, 2012	HTML	60.8	29.4	4.3	1	0.2	
2011 election	November 7, 2011	PDF	64.25	31.97	2.87	0.56	0.33	0.02

== Riding-by-riding results ==
People in bold represent cabinet ministers and the speaker. Party leaders are italicized. The symbols ** indicates MLAs who are not running again.

=== Northwest Saskatchewan ===
Electoral District	Candidates					Incumbent
Electoral District	SK Party	New Democratic	Liberal	Green	PC	Incumbent
Athabasca	Philip Elliott; 644 (23.72%)	Buckley Belanger; 1,756 (64.68%)	Michael Wolverine; 262 (9.65%)	Max Morin; 53 (1.95%)		Buckley Belanger
Cut Knife-Turtleford	Larry Doke; 5,765 (79.83%)	Danica Lorer; 958 (13.27%)	Rod Gopher; 255 (3.53%)	Tammy Fairley Saunders; 90 (1.25%)	Rick Cline; 154 (2.13%)	Larry Doke
Lloydminster	Colleen Young; 4,350 (86.16%)	Michelle Oleksyn; 432 (8.56%)	Dolores Pahtayken; 202 (4.00%)	Lisa Grant; 65 (1.29%)		Colleen Young
Meadow Lake	**Jeremy Harrison**; 4,395 (70.47%)	Dwayne Lasas; 1,430 (22.93%)	Eric McCrimmon; 305 (4.89%)	Eric Schalm; 107 (1.72%)		**Jeremy Harrison**
Rosthern-Shellbrook	**Scott Moe**; 4,792 (71.59%)	Rose Freeman; 1,288 (19.52%)	Orrin M. Greyeyes; 468 (7.09%)	Jade Duckett; 119 (1.80%)		Scott Moe
The Battlefords	**Herb Cox**; 4,296 (60.70%)	Rob Feist; 2,260 (31.93%)	Dexter Gopher; 438 (6.19%)	Josh Hunt; 83 (1.17%)		**Herb Cox**

=== Northeast Saskatchewan ===
Electoral District	Candidates					Incumbent
Electoral District	SK Party	New Democratic	Liberal	Green	Other	Incumbent
Batoche	Delbert Kirsch; 4,471 (64.76%)	Clayton DeBray; 2,211 (30.62%)	Graham Tweten; 216 (3.13%)	B Garneau I 103 (1.49%)		Delbert Kirsch
Canora-Pelly	Terry Dennis; 4,318 (67.47%)	Theresa Wilson; 1,323 (20.67%)	Kyle Budz; 216 (3.00%)	Rachel Gregoire; 102 (1.59%)	Merv Malish (PC); 414 (6.47%) David Sawkiw (WIP); 51 (0.80%)	Ken Krawetz**
Carrot River Valley	Fred Bradshaw; 5,104 (75.96%)	Sandy Ewen; 1,369 (20.38%)	Karalasingham Sadadcharam; 131 (1.95%)	Koreena Fibke; 115 (1.71%)		Fred Bradshaw
Cumberland	Thomas Sierzycki; 1,610 (29.73%)	Doyle Vermette; 3,375 (62.32%)	George Morin; 352 (6.50%)	Michael Taylor-Lessard; 79 (1.46%)		Doyle Vermette
Kelvington-Wadena	Hugh Nerlien; 5,133 (69.98%)	Dan Hiscock; 1,354 (18.46%)	Bernie Yuzdepski; 132 (1.80%)	Owen Swiderski; 108 (1.47%)	Tim Atchison (PC); 390 (5.32%) Walter Hrappsted (WIP); 218 (2.97%)	June Draude**
Melfort	Kevin Phillips; 5,579 (77.09%)	Linsey Thornton; 1,406 (19.43%)	Bruce Ber; 150 (2.07%)	Tanner Wallace; 102 (1.41%)		Kevin Phillips
Prince Albert Carlton	Joe Hargrave; 3,353 (54.81%)	Shayne Lazarowich; 2,670 (41.19%)	Winston McKay; 199 (3.07%)	Asia Yellowtail; 60 (0.93%)		Vacant
Prince Albert Northcote	Victoria Jurgens; 2,491 (44.46%)	Nicole Rancourt; 2,752 (49.12%)	Jonathan Fraser; 272 (4.85%)	Trace Yellowtail; 88 (1.57%)		Victoria Jurgens
Saskatchewan Rivers	Nadine Wilson; 4,584 (67.04%)	Lyle Whitefish; 2,010 ( 29.39%)	Brenda McKnight; 244 (3.57%)			Nadine Wilson

=== West Central Saskatchewan ===
Electoral District	Candidates					Incumbent
Electoral District	SK Party	New Democratic	Liberal	Green	Other	Incumbent
Arm River	Greg Brkich; 6,187 (73.39%)	Denise Leduc; 1,457 (17.28%)	Russ Collicott; 207 (2.46%)	Dale Dewar; 241 (2.86%)	Raymond Carrick (PC); 338 (4.01%)	Greg Brkich; Arm River-Watrous
Biggar-Sask Valley	Randy Weekes; 5,972 (76.75%)	Dan Richert; 1,453 (18.67%)	Faiza Kanwal; 194 (2.49%)	Ryan Lamarche; 162 (2.08%)		Randy Weekes; Biggar
Humboldt-Watrous	**Donna Harpauer**; 5,818 (74.54%)	Adam Duke; 1,588 (20.35%)	Robert Tutka; 212 (2.72%)	Lori Ellen Harper; 187 (2.40%)		**Donna Harpauer**; Humboldt
Kindersley	**Bill Boyd**; 4,802 (67.95%)	Charles Jedlicka; 522 (7.39%)	Darren Donald; 171 (2.42%)		Jason Dearborn (Ind.); 1,249 (17.67%) Terry Smith (PC); 323 (4.57%)	**Bill Boyd**
Martensville-Warman	**Nancy Heppner**; 6,854 (79.45%)	Jasmine Calix; 1,477 (17.12%)	Michael McAteer; 179 (2.07%)	Darcy Robilliard; 91 (1.05%)	Pamela Spencer (WIP); 26 (0.30%)	**Nancy Heppner**; Martensville
Rosetown-Elrose	**Jim Reiter**; 5,939 (77.66%)	Glenn Wright; 1,380 (18.05%)	Adrian Janssens; 146 (1.91%)	Yvonne Potter Pihach; 182 (2.38%)		**Jim Reiter**

=== Southwest Saskatchewan ===
Electoral District	Candidates					Incumbent
Electoral District	SK Party	New Democratic	Liberal	Green	PC	Incumbent
Cypress Hills	Doug Steele; 5,774 (79.50%)	Barb Genert; 875 (12.05%)	Charles Tait; 99 (1.36%)	Marie Crowe; 133 (1.83%)	John Goohsen; 382 (5.26%)	Wayne Elhard**
Lumsden-Morse	**Lyle Stewart**; 6,256 (75.08%)	Rhonda Phillips; 1,655 (19.86%)	Gerry Hiebert; 242 (2.90%)	Patricia Crowther; 179 (2.15%)		**Lyle Stewart**; Thunder Creek
Moose Jaw North	Warren Michelson; 4,425 (60.80%)	Corey Atkinson; 2,517 (34.58%)	Brenda Colenutt; 194 (2.67%)	Caleb MacLowich; 142 (1.95%)		Warren Michelson
Moose Jaw Wakamow	Greg Lawrence; 3,514 (53.07%)	Karen Purdy; 2,819 (42.58%)	Terry Gabel; 182 (2.75%)	Shaun Drake; 106 (1.60%)		Greg Lawrence
Swift Current	**Brad Wall**; 6,071 (82.44%)	Hailey Clark; 1,112 (15.10%)	Glenn Smith; 78 (1.06%)	George Watson; 103 (1.40%)		**Brad Wall**
Wood River	Dave Marit; 6,125 (76.08%)	Brenda Shenher; 991 (12.31%)	Edward Ives; 191 (2.37%)	Judy Mergel; 200 (2.48%)	Brian Archer; 544 (6.76%)	Yogi Huyghebaert**

=== Southeast Saskatchewan ===
Electoral District	Candidates					Incumbent
Electoral District	SK Party	New Democratic	Liberal	Green	Other	Incumbent
Cannington	**Dan D'Autremont**; 6,444 (84.47%)	Nathaniel Cole; 674 (8.83%)	Patrick Dennie; 133 (1.74%)	Tierra Lemieux; 133 (1.74%)	Kurt Schmidt (PC); 245 (3.21%)	**Dan D'Autremont**
Estevan	Lori Carr; 5,454 (77.86%)	Tina Vuckovic; 635 (9.06%)	Oskar Karkabatov; 118 (1.68%)	Branden Schick; 89 (1.27%)	Paul Carroll (PC); 618 (8.82%) Cam Robock (Ind.); 91 (1.30%)	Doreen Eagles**
Indian Head-Milestone	**Don McMorris**; 5,118 (67.36%)	Ashley Nemeth; 1,848 (24.32%)	David Delainey; 264 (3.47%)	Andrea Huang; 143 (1.88%)	Sheila Olson (PC); 225 (2.96%)	**Don McMorris**
Last Mountain-Touchwood	Glen Hart; 4,274 (62.18%)	Mary Ann Harrison; 1,572 (22.87%)	David Buchocik; 212 (3.08%)	Justin Stranack; 104 (1.51%)	Rick Swenson (PC); 689 (10.02%) Frank J. Serfas (WIP); 23 (0.33%)	Glen Hart
Melville-Saltcoats	Warren Kaeding; 5,311 (72.74%)	Leonard Dales; 1,595 (21.85%)	Igor Riabchyk; 138 (1.89%)		Diana Lowe (PC); 192 (2.63%) Trever Ratti (Ind.); 65 (0.89%)	Bob Bjornerud**
Moosomin	Steven Bonk; 5,142 (72.31%)	Ashlee Hicks; 1,032 (14.51%)	Janice Palmer; 191 (2.69%)	Kate Ecklund; 244 (3.43%)	Lloyd Hauser (PC); 284 (3.99%) Trevor Bearance (Ind.); 218 (3.07%)	Don Toth**
Weyburn-Big Muddy	**Dustin Duncan**; 6,177 (78.74%)	Karen Wormsbecker; 1,260 (16.06%)	Dylan Hart; 122 (1.56%)	Barry Dickie; 155 (1.98%)	Glenn Pohl (PC); 131 (1.67%)	**Dustin Duncan**
Yorkton	**Greg Ottenbreit**; 4,584 (72.56%)	Greg Olson; 1,432 (22.66%)	Aaron Sinclair; 184 (2.91%)	Chad Gregoire; 118 (1.87%)		**Greg Ottenbreit**

=== Saskatoon ===
Electoral District	Candidates					Incumbent
Electoral District	SK Party	New Democratic	Liberal	Green	PC	Incumbent
Saskatoon Centre	Brad Hoffmann; 1,928 (36.62%)	David Forbes; 3,005 (57.08%)	Roman Todos; 203 (3.86%)	Kathryn McDonald; 129 (2.45%)		David Forbes
Saskatoon Churchill-Wildwood	Lisa Lambert; 3,978 (52.59%)	Tanya Dunn-Pierce; 3,044 (40.24%)	Chris Chovin; 414 (5.47%)	Colleen Kennedy; 128 (1.69%)		Vacant; Saskatoon Greystone
Saskatoon Eastview	Corey Tochor; 4,169 (53.39%)	Jesse Todd; 3,198 (40.95%)	Ana Ashraf; 272 (3.48%)	Shawn Setyo; 170 (2.18%)		Corey Tochor
Saskatoon Fairview	**Jennifer Campeau**; 2,951 (48.24%)	Vicki Mowat; 2,769 (45.27%)	Shah Rukh; 308 (5.04%)	Debbie McGraw; 89 (1.45%)		**Jennifer Campeau**
Saskatoon Meewasin	Roger Parent; 3,500 (50.49%)	Nicole White; 2,977 (42.95%)	Constance Sacher; 307 (4.43%)	Daeran Gall; 148 (2.14%)		Roger Parent
Saskatoon Northwest	**Gordon Wyant**; 4,514 (65.49%)	Dennel Pickering; 2,004 (29.07%)	Eric Steiner; 254 (3.68%)	Nylissa Valentine; 121 (1.76%)		**Gordon Wyant**
Saskatoon Nutana	Jamie Brandrick; 2,474 (36.59%)	Cathy Sproule; 3,822 (56.53%)	Robin Schneider; 275 (4.07%)	Jaime Fairley; 190 (2.81%)		Cathy Sproule
Saskatoon Riversdale	Marv Friesen; 2,432 (43.55%)	Danielle Chartier; 2,691 (48.19%)	Robert Rudachyk; 354 (6.34%)	Julia MacKay; 107 (1.92%)		Danielle Chartier
Saskatoon Silverspring-Sutherland	Paul Merriman; 4,482 (63.69%)	Zaigham Kayani; 2,003 (28.46%)	James Gorin; 303 (4.31%)	Evangeline Godron; 127 (1.80%)	Jeff Wortman; 122 (1.73%)	New District
Saskatoon Southeast	**Don Morgan**; 5,247 (67.75%)	Michael Karras; 2,169 (28.01%)	Pradipta Das; 225 (2.91%)	Deanna Robilliard; 104 (1.34%)		**Don Morgan**
Saskatoon Stonebridge-Dakota	Bronwyn Eyre; 6,584 (69.97%)	Steve Jimbo; 2,300 (24.44%)	Kevin Ber; 377 (4.01%)	Michelle Wendzina; 149 (1.58%)		New District
Saskatoon University	Eric Olauson; 3,080 (48.03%)	Jennifer Bowes; 2,732 (42.61%)	Ezaz Jaseem; 370 (5.77%)	Garnet Hall; 129 (2.01%)	Rose Buscholl; 101 (1.58%)	Paul Merriman‡ Saskatoon Sutherland
Saskatoon Westview	David Buckingham; 3,892 (49.07%)	Cam Broten; 3,675 (46.34%)	Naveed Anwar; 240 (3.03%)	Tammy McDonald; 124 (1.56%)		Cam Broten; Saskatoon Massey Place
Saskatoon Willowgrove	Ken Cheveldayoff; 6,603 (72.11%)	Tajinder Grewal; 2,196 (23.98%)	Jason Gorin; 229 (2.50%)	Sarah Risk; 129 (1.41%)		Ken Cheveldayoff; Saskatoon Silver Springs

=== Regina ===
Electoral District	Candidates					Incumbent
Electoral District	SK Party	New Democratic	Liberal	Green	Other	Incumbent
Regina Coronation Park	**Mark Docherty**; 3,008 (47.84%)	Ted Jaleta; 2,861 (45.51%)	Tara Jijian; 245 (3.90%)	Melvin Pylypchuk; 103 (1.64%)	Douglas Hudgin (Ind.); 70 (1.11%)	**Mark Docherty**
Regina Douglas Park	CJ Katz; 2,531 (38.90%)	Nicole Sarauer; 3,242 (49.83%)	Curt Schroeder; 332 (5.10%)	Victor Lau; 401 (6.16%)		Russ Marchuk**
Regina Elphinstone-Centre	Bill Stevenson; 1,351 (30.20%)	Warren McCall; 2,648 (59.19%)	Patrick Denis; 297 (6.64%)	Dianna Holigroski; 178 (3.98%)		Warren McCall
Regina Gardiner Park	Gene Makowsky; 4,259 (59.57%)	Faycal Haggui; 2,459 (34.39%)	Jesse Albanez; 294 (4.11%)	Liam Becker Lau; 138 (1.93%)		Gene Makowsky; Regina Dewdney
Regina Lakeview	Dan Cooper; 2,715 (35.19%)	Carla Beck; 4,358 (56.49%)	Stewart Kerr; 391 (5.07%)	Larry Neufeld; 251 (3.25%)		John Nilson**
Regina Northeast	**Kevin Doherty**; 3,920 (54.65%)	Kathleen O’Reilly; 2,912 (40.60%)	Hafeez Chaudhuri; 186 (2.59%)	Marlene Macfarlane; 155 (2.16%)		**Kevin Doherty**
Regina Pasqua	Muhammad Fiaz; 3,929 (44.24%)	Heather McIntyre; 3,631 (40.88%)	Darrin Lamoureux; 962 (10.83%)	Mike Wright; 186 (2.09%)	Desmond Bilsky (PC); 174 (1.96%)	New District
Regina Rochdale	Laura Ross; 5,769 (59.04%)	Brett Estey; 3,554 (36.37%)	Nadeem Islam; 293 (3.00%)	Billy Patterson; 155 (1.59%)		Laura Ross; Regina Qu'Appelle Valley
Regina Rosemont	Kevin Dureau; 3,101 (41.89%)	Trent Wotherspoon; 3,994 (53.95%)	Reid Hill; 162 (2.19%)	Sara Piotrofsky; 146 (1.97%)		Trent Wotherspoon
Regina University	Tina Beaudry-Mellor; 3,418 (48.93%)	Aleana Young; 3,001 (42.96%)	Silvia Volodko; 401 (5.74%)	Yordanos Tesfamariam; 165 (2.36%)		Bill Hutchinson**; Regina South
Regina Walsh Acres	Warren Steinley; 3,575 (51.30%)	Gloria Patrick; 2,976 (42.70%)	Reina Sinclair; 312 (4.48%)	Leonie Williams; 106 (1.52%)		Warren Steinley
Regina Wascana Plains	**Christine Tell**; 6,107 (65.55%)	Kaytlyn Criddle; 2,525 (27.10%)	Gulraiz Tariq; 287 (3.08%)	Jeremy O'Connor; 153 (1.64%)	Allen Mryglod (PC); 245 (2.63%)	**Christine Tell**
