= Saskatoon Stonebridge =

Saskatchewan electoral district

Provincial electoral district
- Legislature: Legislative Assembly of Saskatchewan
MLA
Darcy Warrington
New Democratic
- District created: 2022
- First contested: 2024

Demographics
- Census division: Division No. 11
- Census subdivision: Saskatoon

Saskatoon Stonebridge is a provincial electoral district for the Legislative Assembly of Saskatchewan, Canada.

The riding was created by redistribution in 2022, and was created from the urban portion of Saskatoon Stonebridge-Dakota along with redistributed portions of Saskatoon Eastview and Saskatoon Nutana. The riding includes the Saskatoon neighbourhood of Stonebridge.

== Election results ==
2024 Saskatchewan general election
Party	Candidate	Votes	%	±%
New Democratic	Darcy Warrington	3,789	53.84	+14.7
Saskatchewan	Bronwyn Eyre	3,076	43.71	-13.2
Green	Cheryl Mazil	94	1.34	-1.2
Progress	Jahangir J. Valiani	79	1.12	
Total valid votes		7,038	99.67	
Total rejected ballots		23	0.33	
Turnout		7,061		
Eligible voters		–		
Source: Elections Saskatchewan
New Democratic gain from Saskatchewan		Swing		+14.0

2020 provincial election redistributed results
Party	%
Saskatchewan	56.9
New Democratic	39.1
Green	2.5
Buffalo	1.6
