= Jennifer Bowes =

Canadian politician

Member of the Saskatchewan Legislative Assembly for Saskatoon University
- In office November 4, 2020 – October 1, 2024
- Preceded by: Eric Olauson
- Succeeded by: Tajinder Grewal

Critic Advanced Education, Innovation, and Status of Women; Associate Critic Labour
- In office November 4, 2020 – October 1, 2024
- Leader: Ryan Meili and Carla Beck

Deputy Whip of the Saskatchewan NDP
- In office November 4, 2020 – October 5, 2022
- Leader: Ryan Meili and Carla Beck
- Succeeded by: Nathaniel Teed

Personal details
- Party: New Democratic Party
- Education: Queen's University
- Occupation: Labour organizer

Jennifer Bowes is a Canadian politician. Bowes was elected to the Legislative Assembly of Saskatchewan in the 2020 Saskatchewan general election. She represented the electoral district of Saskatoon University as a member of the Saskatchewan New Democratic Party caucus from 2020 to 2024.

== Political career ==
Bowes first ran for provincial office in the 2016 election in the newly created riding of Saskatoon University. There she finished second to Saskatchewan Party candidate and former Saskatoon City Councillor Eric Olauson by a margin of 348 votes.

Bowes ran again in the 2020 election, challenging Olauson a second time. This time she won the seat, with a margin of 495 votes.

In November 2020, Bowes was named NDP critic for Advanced Education, Innovation, and the Status of Women. Bowes was also named the associate critic for Labour and the Opposition Deputy Whip.

In June 2023, Bowes announced that she would be completing her term but would not seek re-election in the 2024 provincial election. Bowes highlighted her work advancing the issues of paid sick leave, living wages and pay equity, and access to birth control and abortion services.

In 2026, Bowes endorsed Avi Lewis in that year's federal NDP leadership race.

== Personal life ==
Bowes was born in Saskatoon and raised in Waldheim, Saskatchewan. She earned a bachelor's degree in Psychology from Queen's University in Kingston, Ontario.

After graduating, Bowes worked with the Saskatchewan Ministries of Corrections and Social Services, and was elected vice president of the Elizabeth Fry Society. She also spent time working in Myanmar with CUSO International, before returning to Saskatoon and working as a labour organizer for healthcare workers with SEIU West.

== Electoral results ==
2020 Saskatchewan general election: Saskatoon University
Party	Candidate	Votes	%
New Democratic	Jennifer Bowes	3,225	52.97
Saskatchewan	Eric Olauson	2,730	44.84
Green	Erickka Patmore	133	2.19
Total valid votes		6,088	100.00
Source: Elections Saskatchewan

2016 Saskatchewan general election: Saskatoon University
Party	Candidate	Votes	%
Saskatchewan	Eric Olauson	3,080	48.03
New Democratic	Jennifer Bowes	2,732	42.61
Liberal	Ezaz Jaseem	370	5.77
Green	Garnet Hall	129	2.01
Progressive Conservative	Rose Buscholl	101	1.58
Total valid votes		6,437	100.00
Source: Saskatchewan Archives - Election Results by Electoral Division; Elections Saskatchewan
