= Eric Cline (politician) =

Canadian politician (born 1955)

The Honourable Eric H. Cline ECS

Member of the Legislative Assembly of Saskatchewan for Saskatoon Idylwyld
- In office October 21, 1991 – June 21, 1995
- Preceded by: New riding
- Succeeded by: Janice MacKinnon

Member of the Legislative Assembly of Saskatchewan for Saskatoon Mount Royal
- In office June 21, 1995 – November 5, 2003
- Preceded by: New riding
- Succeeded by: Riding abolished

Member of the Legislative Assembly of Saskatchewan for Saskatoon Massey Place
- In office November 5, 2003 – November 7, 2007
- Preceded by: New riding
- Succeeded by: Cam Broten

Personal details
- Born: August 12, 1955 (age 71) Saskatoon, Saskatchewan
- Party: New Democratic Party
- Education: University of Saskatchewan
- Occupation: Lawyer

Eric H. Cline (born August 12, 1955) is a former Canadian politician. He served in the Legislative Assembly of Saskatchewan as the New Democratic Party (NDP) Member of the Legislative Assembly for Saskatoon Idylwyld from 1991 to 1995, Saskatoon Mount Royal from 1995 to 2003, and Saskatoon Massey Place 2003 to 2007. He was a senior cabinet minister in the governments of Roy Romanow and Lorne Calvert. Appointed to Cabinet in November 1995, he had responsibility for a number of portfolios including Health, Labour, Finance, Justice, and Industry and Resources. On December 15, 2006, Cline announced his intention to not run in the 2007 election. He continued to serve in Cabinet until May 31, 2007. Cam Broten, subsequently Leader of the Saskatchewan NDP (2012- ) and Leader of the Opposition in the Saskatchewan Lesgislature (2012- ), was elected to replace him as the MLA for Saskatoon Massey Place.

== Early life and career ==
Cline received a Bachelor of Arts degree in political science from the University of Saskatchewan in 1976. He campaigned for the NDP while still a student, finishing third in Regina South in the 1975 provincial election. He subsequently received a Bachelor of Laws from the University of Saskatchewan, was called to the Saskatchewan Bar in 1980, and was a partner in the Saskatoon firm Woloshyn & Co. prior to his 1991 election.

== Member of Provincial Legislature ==
=== Government backbencher ===
He was first elected to the Saskatchewan legislature in the 1991 provincial election, winning election in the safe NDP seat of Saskatoon Idylwyld. The New Democrats won a majority government under the leadership of Roy Romanow, and Cline served as a government backbencher. He was re-elected for the new seat of Saskatoon Mount Royal in the 1995 election.

In March 1995, Cline announced that he would support his local Member of Parliament, Chris Axworthy, for leader of the federal New Democratic Party. Axworthy subsequently declined to run.

=== Minister of Health ===
Cline was called to cabinet on November 22, 1995, and was given the senior portfolio of Minister of Health. He continued with the Romanow government's previous health reforms, and defended the decision to create consolidated regional health boards. A defender of the public health system, he helped bring forward the Health Facilities Licensing Act in May 1996 to restrict private clinics from being established in the province. Shortly thereafter, he eased restrictions on private nursing homes in the province. Cline described this as a fair compromise, though some in the public sector described the latter initiative as an abandonment of medicare.

During the same legislative session, Cline introduced legislation to permit greater tax incentives for those who donate money to the health-care system. In August 1996, he announced that the provincial and federal governments would cooperate to construct a new Athabasca health facility in northern Saskatchewan. Later in the year, after accusations of underfunding by the Saskatchewan Nurses Union, Cline and the Romanow government introduced an additional $40 million for the provincial health system.

In 1997, Cline indicated that Saskatchewan would take steps toward the legalization and regulation of midwifery, and announced a $25,000 incentive for doctors setting up a practice in rural communities. He also spoke out against plans by the federal government of Jean Chrétien to offer pharmaceutical companies twenty-year patent protection for new prescription drugs. In June 1997, he encouraged the Canadian federal and provincial governments to pool their resources in a class action lawsuit against tobacco companies for health-related expenses.

He also served as Acting Minister of Labour from July 1, 1996 to August 6, 1996.

=== Minister of Finance ===
==== Romanow government ====
Cline was promoted to Minister of Finance in the Romanow government on June 27, 1997, replacing Janice MacKinnon. He introduced the Romanow government's fourth consecutive balanced budget in March 1998. Highlighted by an unexpected 2% provincial income tax cut, the budget also provided tax incentives for the film and energy sectors, while increasing spending on health, education and roads. In August, he released figures indicating that the provincial surplus target was $11 million more than expected.

Cline wrote an editorial piece in the Financial Post newspaper in mid-1998, arguing that the Romanow government had prevented Saskatchewan from falling into bankruptcy through its policy decisions since 1991. The editorial was a response to a previous Post article which questioned the Romanow government's financial record.

Just before the 1999 budget was unveiled, Cline announced that the Saskatchewan government would contribute $140 million to a farm-aid package. This payment reduced the estimated budget surplus to $8 million from $105 million. The final totals indicated a surplus of $28 million.

Cline's 1999 budget reduced the provincial sales tax by 1%, and put $195 million of new spending into health care. Two months later, he announced that the province would conduct a review of its tax system. This announcement led to the creation of the Personal Income Tax Review Committee, which held several public meetings throughout the summer of 1999, and recommended a new personal income tax system for Saskatchewan, which Cline introduced in the 2000 Saskatchewan budget.

The NDP was unexpectedly reduced to a minority government in the 1999 provincial election, and later formed a coalition government with the Liberal Party. Cline was personally re-elected without difficulty and was retained as Finance Minister.

Cline released the coalition government's first budget in 2000, which featured income tax cuts and an expansion of the sales tax. He described the budget as providing for "growth and opportunity for Saskatchewan" rather than "buying the short-term goodwill of people with their own tax dollars." It was largely welcomed by the business community, and was given an "A" grade from the leader of the North Saskatoon Business Association. The budget also included a controversial provision to extend the provincial sales tax to off-reserve aboriginals.

Expanding oil and gas revenues brought the Saskatchewan government an unexpected windfall of $370 million in late 2000. In late November, Cline was able to announce $150 million worth of spending for road and highway repairs over the next three years. The final budget surplus for the fiscal year ending in 2001 was $58 million, much higher than the $9 million projected.

==== Calvert government ====
Romanow announced his retirement as Premier of Saskatchewan and NDP leader in September 2000. Cline was mentioned by some as a possible successor, but he declined to contest the position and did not publicly endorse another candidate. Lorne Calvert was chosen as Romanow's successor in February 2001, and he retained Cline as Finance Minister.

Cline's first budget under Calvert introduced $370 million worth of new spending, while also providing tax cuts for small business and projecting a narrow $2.8 million surplus. Some have argued that the budget marked a turning away from the more fiscally conservative approach of the Romanow government. Subsequent declines in gas revenue and losses in federal equalization later forced Cline to withdraw $479 million from the fiscal stabilization fund to prevent a return to deficit spending. In early 2002, he announced that the province would begin issuing quarterly financial reports.

Despite the worsening economic circumstances, Cline was able to present the NDP's eighth consecutive balanced budget in early 2002 with a modest surplus of $45,000. The budget reduced the size of government, while further increasing health spending and introducing taxes on tobacco and liquor. To avoid going into deficit, Cline was required to withdraw another $225 million from the fiscal stabilization fund. A subsequent Prairie drought reduced revenues further, and he needed to access the fund again later in the year. In December 2002, Cline and his government reduced fees and taxes in the oil industry to encourage further provincial development.

Cline endorsed Lorne Nystrom for the leadership of the federal New Democratic Party in September 2002, and was part of Nystrom's campaign team. At the party's 2003 convention, Cline argued that Nystrom was best positioned to "speak to the realities of the market economy and how to generate wealth" while also affirming the role of public programs "to maximize equality of opportunity". Nystrom finished third against Jack Layton.

Cline's third-quarter update in January 2003 showed a surplus of $100,000, maintained by the stabilization fund. While acknowledging the surplus, the auditor general suggested that the government was concealing some economic difficulties by transferring funds among departments and crown corporations.

After serving as Finance Minister for over five years, Cline was reassigned as Minister of Justice and Attorney-General and as Minister of Industry in February 2003. He replaced the retiring Chris Axworthy in the former position, and Eldon Laudermilch in the latter. Jim Melenchuk was chosen as Cline's successor in Finance.

=== Minister of Justice ===
Cline announced in late February 2003 that the province would hold an inquiry into the death of Neil Stonechild, a seventeen-year-old aboriginal youth who was found frozen to death in 1990. His death was ruled accidental, but many believe he was abandoned outside of town by members of the police force. Both the Federation of Saskatchewan Indian Nations and the Saskatoon Police Association welcomed the decision for an inquiry.

Cline also announced that Saskatchewan would become the first province to completely protect Registered Retirement Savings Plans (RRSPs) and related funds from creditors, in the event of bankruptcy.

In June 2003, Cline announced that the Saskatchewan government would charge David Ahenakew with promoting hatred. Ahenakew, once a respected aboriginal leader, had delivered a speech describing Jews as a "disease" who deserved to be "fried" in The Holocaust. The Canadian Jewish Congress commended Cline for his courage in bringing the case before the courts.

In October 2003, Cline announced that the Saskatchewan government would establish a commission to investigate the wrongful conviction of David Milgaard in 1969.

=== Minister of Industry and Resources ===
In June 2003, Cline led a Saskatchewan trade delegation to an international conference on biotechnology in Washington, D.C. His intent was to develop international contacts, and specifically to export Saskatchewan's biotechnology expertise to India. The initiative was reported as a success.

The NDP narrowly recovered their majority government in the 2003 provincial election. Cline, once again re-elected without difficulty, was appointed to a restructured Ministry of Industry and Resources while yielding the Justice portfolio. He also became Chair of the Liquor and Gaming Authority, and minister responsible for the Saskatchewan Research Council, Saskatchewan Opportunities Corporation, Tourism Saskatchewan, Information Services Corporation of Saskatchewan, and Investment Saskatchewan (formerly known as Crown Investments Corp.). In December 2003, he announced that Titanium Corporation Inc. would construct the world's first Mineral Sands Processing Facility at the Regina Research Park.

As chair of the Liquor and Gaming Authority, Cline approved plans for a new casino on the Whitecap Dakota Sioux reserve in August 2004. The provincial auditor general had previously raised concerns about the Saskatchewan Indian Gaming Authority's accounting methods. Cline acknowledged that the SIGA had made significant improvements in recent years, and indicated that the government would hold the casino's profits in trust if further concerns were not resolved.

Cline led a twelve-day business excursion to Europe in September 2004, and spoke at the World Nuclear Association Symposium in London. He presented to the conference on Saskatchewan's pioneering Reclaimed Industrial Sites Act, which requires funds to be in place to ensure environmental reclamation and monitoring after mines shut down. In response to opposition questions later in the year, he argued that constructing a nuclear power plant in Saskatchewan would not be economically viable.

In January 2005, Cline presided over an economic conference in Saskatoon billed as the Centennial Summit. Representatives from several industries gathered in the city, and called for a more competitive business environment. The following year, Calvert and Cline headed a Saskatchewan delegation on energy resources to the United States, which met with Vice-President Dick Cheney.

Cline was identified as the best minister in the Calvert government in 2005 by members of the government, opposition and media, amid a general economic recovery in the province. He relinquished cabinet responsibility for the Gaming and Liquor commission in early 2006.

== Retiring from public life ==
On December 15, 2006, Cline announced that he would not be seeking re-election. On April 19, 2007, New Democrats in the constituency of Saskatoon Massey Place selected Cam Broten to be their candidate in the next provincial election. Broten won the nomination on the first ballot after a three-way race. 400 people were in attendance at the nomination meeting. On April 23, 2007, Cline stated the following about Broten: "Cam Broten is young, enthusiastic, intelligent, hard-working, and absolutely dedicated to the ideas and values at the heart of Saskatchewan’s success ... I have every confidence that he will prove to be an outstanding representative for Saskatoon Massey Place."

Broten was elected for Saskatoon Massey Place in the 2011 Saskatchewan general election. He became Leader of the Saskatchewan New Democratic Party and Leader of the Opposition in the Saskatchewan legislature in 2012, but was defeated in the 2016 Saskatchewan general election in the new riding of Saskatoon Westview.

After leaving politics, Cline returned to work in the private sector in Saskatoon, first as Vice President of a diamond exploration company (2007-2012), then as a corporate lawyer and Vice President of a potash company (2012-2018). He remained active in the community, serving on various community and industry boards, including the Saskatchewan Mining Association, YMCA of Saskatoon, Shakespeare on the Saskatchewan Theatre and several others, all in a voluntary unpaid capacity.

In 2008, a memoir of his time in politics, Making a Difference—Reflections From Political Life, was published by Thistledown Press in Saskatoon and Cline oversaw the construction of a new home in Saskatoon that year and in 2009.

After retiring as a corporate executive in 2018, Cline returned to the practice of law part time and commenced working as a fused glass artist on a professional basis. He joined the Saskatchewan Craft Council as a professional craftsperson in 2018 and became a peer-reviewed juried member of the Council in the category of glass the following year. He became a member of the Saskatoon Glassworkers Guild, established Cline Art in Glass and commenced selling works and accepting commissions for homes and offices in Saskatoon and other centres in Saskatchewan, Alberta, Ottawa and Washington DC.

In 2019 Cline ended a 47 year association with the federal wing of the New Democratic Party following the expulsion of Regina Lewvan member of Parliament Erin Weir by federal NDP leader Jagmeet Singh. Cline joined with 67 other formerly elected New Democrats to raise concerns about the expulsion. Singh summarily dismissed the concerns on national television by describing the former members as “persons occupying positions of privilege” trying to “intimidate” him.

In a full-page article in the National Post in August 2019 and a longer essay in the international online magazine Quillette the next month, Cline strongly condemned the expulsion arguing there had been clear evidence of malice and bias, rush to judgement, lack of due process, procedural unfairness, a contrived fishing expedition, inconsistency in treatment of caucus members, lack of transparency, and selective and misleading provision or withholding of information, all overseen by Singh acting unilaterally. Cline expressed the view that Singh‘s judgement and sense of balance was seriously flawed. There was no response to any substantive issue raised by the former politicians or by Cline other than Singh’s televised personal characterization of them, and no NDP Member of Parliament or executive officer expressed concern.

In 2020, Cline earned the designation Qualified Arbitrator from the Alternate Dispute Resolution Institute of Canada and began to serve as a neutral Arbitrator on occasion.
