= Biggar-Sask Valley =

Provincial electoral district in Saskatchewan, Canada

Saskatchewan electoral district

Defunct provincial electoral district
- Legislature: Legislative Assembly of Saskatchewan
- District created: 2013
- First contested: 2016
- Last contested: 2020

Biggar-Sask Valley was a provincial electoral district for the Legislative Assembly of Saskatchewan, Canada. It was created from parts of former Biggar, Martensville, Cut Knife-Turtleford, Batoche and Rosthern-Shellbrook ridings. It was first contested in the 2016 election. The riding was dissolved into Kindersley-Biggar, Rosthern-Shellbrook, Rosetown-Delisle, Martensville-Blairmore and Warman prior to the next general election.

== Members of the Legislative Assembly ==
This riding has elected the following members of the Legislative Assembly:

Legislature	Years	Member	Party
Biggar-Sask Valley; Riding created from Biggar, Martensville, Cut Knife-Turtleford, Batoche and Rosthern-Shellbrook
28th	2016–2020	Randy Weekes	Saskatchewan
29th	2020–2024	Randy Weekes	Saskatchewan
29th	2024–2024	Randy Weekes	Independent

== Election results ==
2020 Saskatchewan general election
Party	Candidate	Votes	%	±%
Saskatchewan	Randy Weekes	5,775	73.52	-3.23
New Democratic	Twyla Harris Naciri	1,193	15.19	-3.48
Buffalo	Trevor Simpson	698	8.88	–
Green	Darcy Robilliard	189	2.41	+0.33
Total valid votes		7,855	99.46	
Total rejected ballots		43	0.54	–
Turnout		7,898	–	–
Eligible voters		–		
Saskatchewan hold		Swing		–
Source: Elections Saskatchewan

2016 Saskatchewan general election
Party	Candidate	Votes	%	±%
Saskatchewan	Randy Weekes	5,972	76.75	–
New Democratic	Dan Richert	1,453	18.67	–
Liberal	Faiza Kanwal	194	2.49	–
Green	Ryan Lamarche	162	2.08	–
Total valid votes		7,781	100.0	
Eligible voters		–		
Saskatchewan pickup new district.				
Source: Elections Saskatchewan

== See also ==
- List of Saskatchewan provincial electoral districts
- List of Saskatchewan general elections
- Canadian provincial electoral districts
