= Darcy Warrington =

Canadian politician

Darcy Warrington MLA

Member of the Legislative Assembly of Saskatchewan for Saskatoon Stonebridge
- Incumbent
- Assumed office October 28, 2024
- Preceded by: Bronwyn Eyre

Shadow Minister for Parks, Culture, and Sports
- Incumbent
- Assumed office Nov 13, 2024
- Preceded by: Nathaniel Teed

Personal details
- Party: Saskatchewan New Democratic Party

Darcy Warrington is a Canadian politician who was elected to the Legislative Assembly of Saskatchewan in the 2024 general election, representing Saskatoon Stonebridge as a member of the New Democratic Party.

== Election results ==
2024 Saskatchewan general election
Party	Candidate	Votes	%	±%
New Democratic	Darcy Warrington	3,789	53.84	+14.7
Saskatchewan	Bronwyn Eyre	3,076	43.71	-13.2
Green	Cheryl Mazil	94	1.34	-1.2
Progress	Jahangir J. Valiani	79	1.12	
Total valid votes		7,038	99.67	
Total rejected ballots		23	0.33	
Turnout		7,061		
Eligible voters		–		
Source: Elections Saskatchewan
New Democratic gain from Saskatchewan		Swing		+14.0
