= Cam Broten =

Canadian politician (born 1978)

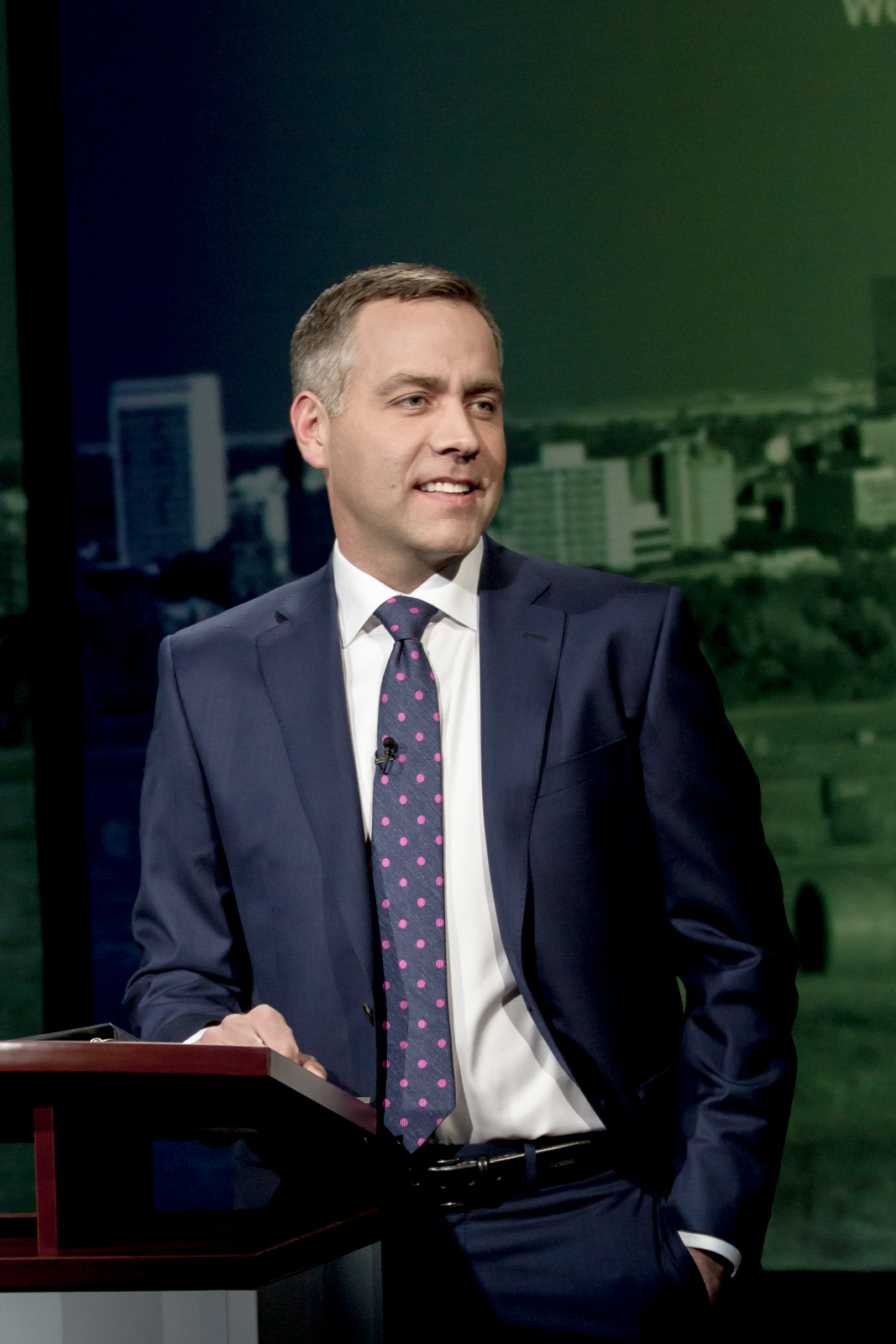

Leader of the Opposition in Saskatchewan
- In office March 9, 2013 – April 4, 2016
- Preceded by: John Nilson (interim)
- Succeeded by: Trent Wotherspoon (interim)

Leader of the Saskatchewan New Democratic Party
- In office March 9, 2013 – April 23, 2016
- Preceded by: John Nilson (interim)
- Succeeded by: Trent Wotherspoon (interim)

Member of the Legislative Assembly of Saskatchewan for Saskatoon Massey Place
- In office November 7, 2007 – April 4, 2016
- Preceded by: Eric Cline
- Succeeded by: riding abolished

Personal details
- Born: Cameron Paul Broten; April 29, 1978 (age 48) Regina, Saskatchewan, Canada
- Party: NDP
- Spouse: Ruth Eliason
- Relations: Hans Broten (grandfather)
- Children: 5
- Education: Simon Fraser University (M.A.); University of Saskatchewan (B.A.)
- Occupation: Politician

Cameron Paul Broten (born April 29, 1978) is a Canadian politician. He represented the constituency of Saskatoon Massey Place in the Legislative Assembly of Saskatchewan from 2007 to 2016 and served as the leader of the Saskatchewan New Democratic Party from 2013 to 2016.

== Early life and education ==
Broten was born in Regina, Saskatchewan in 1978 and spent his early years in the Northern Saskatchewan communities of La Loche, Green Lake, Meadow Lake, and La Ronge before his family settled in Saskatoon. There he attended Marion M. Graham Collegiate. He went on to earn a bachelor's degree in international studies from the University of Saskatchewan and a master's degree in political science from Simon Fraser University.

He worked as a policy analyst with the provincial government, in the Department of Culture, Youth and Recreation, and later as a health policy manager with the Saskatchewan Medical Association. He was also an elected board member with the Saskatoon Co-op.

== Political career ==
=== MLA and NDP Leader ===
Broten was first elected to the Legislative Assembly of Saskatchewan in the 2007 provincial election as a member of the Saskatchewan NDP in the riding of Saskatoon Massey Place. In that election, the NDP lost 10 seats and went from a majority government to the official opposition. In the 2011 provincial election, Broten was one of just 9 NDP MLAs elected as the party was reduced to its smallest presence in the legislature since 1982. Party leader Dwain Lingenfelter lost his own seat and resigned following the election, triggering a leadership race that culminated in March 2013.

Broten announced his intention to run for the leadership in September 2012. He was one of four candidates alongside Saskatoon doctor Ryan Meili, Regina MLA Trent Wotherspoon, and Regina economist Erin Weir. Weir ultimately withdrew before the election and endorsed Meili, which led to a close three-way contest. Meili led on the first ballot by more than 400 votes, but on the second ballot Broten eked out a win by a margin of just 44 votes to become leader. Following the election, Broten appointed Wotherspoon to be his deputy leader.

Despite the narrow victory in the leadership contest, Broten's popularity and support among the party grew quickly. In constitutionally-required party leadership review votes in 2014 and 2015 he received strong endorsements. At the 2014 NDP convention in Moose Jaw he earned 98.7% of delegates' votes, while at the 2015 convention in Regina he received 98% of delegates' votes.

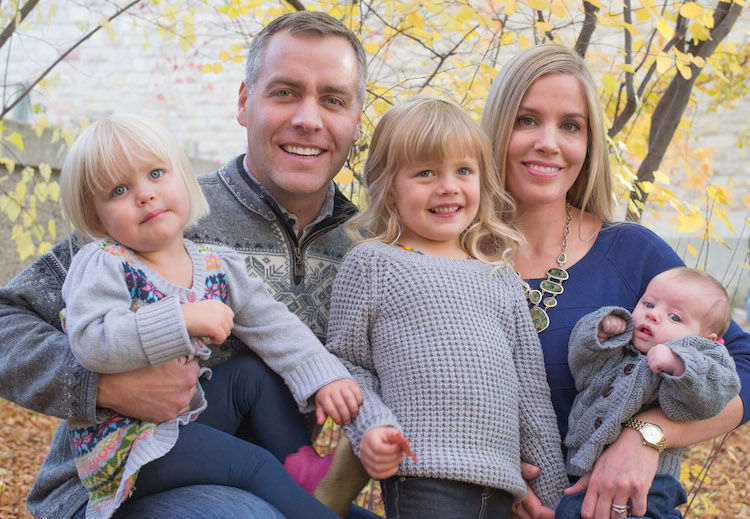
Cam Broten, Ruth Eliason and their daughters in Fall 2014

During his leadership Broten focused on the issues of seniors care, better access and shorter wait times for health care, the elimination of high-cost ambulance fees, and a lower cost of living for families in the province. Broten also proposed caps on classrooms sizes, an increase in the number of educational assistants, and pushed for economic reforms including a new procurement policy and moving away from public-private-partnerships, which he argued ran up development costs while exporting benefits like jobs and profits to other jurisdictions. Broten also supported responsible resource development in Saskatchewan.

In Opposition, Broten put a particular emphasis on criticizing the governing Saskatchewan Party's application of LEAN principles on the province's health care system. Broten also earned support from the majority government for his landmark private member's bill to create an asbestos registry for the province - known as Howard's Law - as well as measures to support local business. He also convinced the government to change its long-standing policy on Canada's Senate; Broten consistently supported abolishment of Canada's upper chamber.

=== 2016 election and resignation ===
Broten led the NDP into the 2016 provincial election against a popular Brad Wall and Saskatchewan Party government. The NDP ultimately won just 10 seats, a gain of one from the previous election, and the Saskatchewan Party was elected to a third successive majority government. In addition, and in an echo of the 2011 election, Broten lost his own seat in the election. Broten's riding of Massey Place was reconfigured prior to the election, and so he ran in the new riding of Saskatoon Westview. There he lost to Saskatchewan Party rookie candidate David Buckingham by 232 votes. The Liberal candidate in the riding, Naveed Anwar, had previously run for the NDP in 2011 and had sought a nomination to run again for the party in 2016. However, he claimed to have been denied the opportunity to run in the riding of his choosing, and he opted to run for the Liberals instead, intending to undermine the NDP. He ultimately received 240 votes, 8 votes more than the margin between Buckingham and Broten.

Broten resigned as party leader following the election on April 11, 2016, and former leadership rival Trent Wotherspoon was appointed interim party leader. Broten thus became only the second Saskatchewan CCF/NDP leader since before the Second World War, following Lingenfelter, to have never served as premier.

== Personal life ==
After resigning as NDP leader, Broten became the executive director of Saskatchewan Egg Producers, an industry marketing group.

In 2004 Broten married Ruth Megan Eliason, a music therapist with Palliative Care Services in the Saskatoon Health Region who was raised on a family farm in the Stewart Valley area near Swift Current. They live in Saskatoon with their four daughters. Their oldest child, a son was born preterm in 2009 and died the same day.

Broten's grandfather, Hans Broten, served in the Legislative Assembly in the 1960s under Tommy Douglas and Woodrow Lloyd.

== Electoral record ==
2016 Saskatchewan general election: Saskatoon Westview
| Party | Candidate | Votes | % |
|---|---|---|---|
| Saskatchewan | David Buckingham | 3,892 | 49.07 |
| New Democratic | Cam Broten | 3,675 | 46.34 |
| Liberal | Naveed Anwar | 240 | 3.03 |
| Green | Tammy McDonald | 124 | 1.56 |
| Total valid votes | | 7,931 | 99.79 |
| Total rejected ballots | | 17 | 0.21 |
| Turnout | | 7,948 | 55.10 |
| Eligible voters | | 14,425 | |
Source: Elections Saskatchewan

2011 Saskatchewan general election: Saskatoon Massey Place
| Party | Candidate | Votes | % | ±% |
|---|---|---|---|---|
| New Democratic | Cam Broten | 3,812 | 53.85 | -1.83 |
| Saskatchewan | Ali Muzaffar | 3,072 | 43.40 | +7.77 |
| Green | Diane West | 195 | 2.75 | +0.47 |
| Total | | 7,079 | 100.00 | |

2007 Saskatchewan general election: Saskatoon Massey Place
| Party | Candidate | Votes | % | ±% |
|---|---|---|---|---|
| New Democratic | Cam Broten | 4,109 | 55.68 | -5.72 |
| Saskatchewan | Dennis Neudorf | 2,629 | 35.63 | +14.06 |
| Liberal | Ashraf Omar | 473 | 6.41 | -8.39 |
| Green | Crystal Stadnyk | 168 | 2.28 | +1.35 |
| Total | | 7,379 | 100.00 | |
