= April ChiefCalf =

Canadian politician

Member of the Saskatchewan Legislative Assembly for Saskatoon Westview
- Incumbent
- Assumed office October 28, 2024
- Preceded by: David Buckingham

Shadow Minister of Housing
- Incumbent
- Assumed office November 13, 2024
- Preceded by: Meara Conway

Personal details
- Party: Saskatchewan NDP

April ChiefCalf is a Canadian politician who was elected to the Legislative Assembly of Saskatchewan in the 2024 general election, representing Saskatoon Westview as a member of the New Democratic Party.

== Career ==
ChiefCalf grew up in Regina. Before entering politics, she spent nineteen years in La Ronge training teachers. After the Northern Teacher Education Program was defunded in 2017, she moved to Saskatoon to work at the University of Saskatchewan.

== Electoral record ==
2024 Saskatchewan general election: Saskatoon Westview
Party	Candidate	Votes	%	±%
New Democratic	April ChiefCalf	3,576	49.56	+8.60
Saskatchewan	David Buckingham	3,502	48.53	–5.76
Green	Jupiter Neault	138	1.91	–0.97
Total valid votes		7,216	98.90	–0.36
Total rejected ballots		88	1.20	+0.36
Turnout		7,304		
Eligible voters		–		
Source: Elections Saskatchewan
