= Saskatoon University (provincial electoral district) =

Provincial electoral district in Saskatchewan, Canada

Saskatchewan electoral district

Defunct provincial electoral district
- Legislature: Legislative Assembly of Saskatchewan
- First contested: 1971
- Last contested: 2020
- Communities: Saskatoon

Saskatoon University was a provincial electoral district for the Legislative Assembly of Saskatchewan, Canada. Revived as a result of the 2013 revision of Saskatchewan's electoral districts, it was last contested in the 2020 election.

Saskatoon University was first created in 1971 and was in existence from 1971 to 1975 and again from 1982 to 1991. The district's first incarnation was merged into Saskatoon Centre in 1975 and its second incarnation was merged into Saskatoon Sutherland-University in 1991. The present incarnation will be dissolved into Saskatoon University-Sutherland and Saskatoon Nutana prior to the next general election.

== Members of the Legislative Assembly ==
| Legislature | Years | Member | Party |
|---|---|---|---|
| 17th | 1971–1973 | John Richards | NDP |
| 17th | 1973–1975 | John Richards | Independent |
See Saskatoon Centre 1975–1982.
| 20th | 1982–1986 | Rick Folk | Progressive Conservative |
| 21st | 1986–1991 | Peter Prebble | NDP |
See Saskatoon Sutherland and Saskatoon Greystone 1991–2016.
| 28th | 2016–2020 | Eric Olauson | Saskatchewan Party |
| 29th | 2020–2024 | Jennifer Bowes | NDP |

== Election results ==
=== Saskatoon University, 2016–present ===
2020 Saskatchewan general election
| Party | Candidate | Votes | % | ±% |
|---|---|---|---|---|
| New Democratic | Jennifer Bowes | 3,225 | 52.97 | +10.37 |
| Saskatchewan | Eric Olauson | 2,730 | 44.84 | -3.19 |
| Green | Erickka Patmore | 133 | 2.19 | +0.18 |
| Total valid votes | | 6,088 | 99.07 | |
| Total rejected ballots | | 57 | 0.93 | +0.54 |
| Turnout | | 6,145 | 54.52 | -4.13 |
| Eligible voters | | 11,272 | | |
| New Democratic gain from Saskatchewan | | Swing | | – |
Source: Elections Saskatchewan

2016 Saskatchewan general election
| Party | Candidate | Votes | % |
|---|---|---|---|
| Saskatchewan | Eric Olauson | 3,080 | 48.03 |
| New Democratic | Jennifer Bowes | 2,732 | 42.60 |
| Liberal | Ezaz Jaseem | 370 | 5.77 |
| Green | Garnet Hall | 129 | 2.01 |
| Progressive Conservative | Rose Buscholl | 101 | 1.57 |
| Total valid votes | | 6,412 | 99.61 |
| Total rejected ballots | | 25 | 0.39 |
| Turnout | | 6,437 | 58.65 |
| Eligible voters | | 10,976 | |
Source: Elections Saskatchewan

== See also ==
- List of Saskatchewan provincial electoral districts
- List of Saskatchewan general elections
- Canadian provincial electoral districts
