= Saskatoon Westview =

Provincial electoral district in Saskatchewan, Canada

Saskatchewan electoral district

Provincial electoral district
- Legislature: Legislative Assembly of Saskatchewan
MLA
April ChiefCalf
New Democratic
- District created: 2013
- First contested: 2016
- Last contested: 2024
- Communities: Saskatoon

Saskatoon Westview is a provincial electoral district for the Legislative Assembly of Saskatchewan, Canada. It was first contested in the 2016 election.

== Members of the Legislative Assembly ==
| Legislature | Years | Member | Party |
|---|---|---|---|
District created from Saskatoon Massey Place, Saskatoon Fairview and Saskatoon Meewasin
| 28th | 2016–2020 | David Buckingham | Saskatchewan Party |
| 29th | 2020–2024 | David Buckingham | Saskatchewan Party |
| 30th | 2024–present | April ChiefCalf | New Democrat |

== Election results ==
2024 Saskatchewan general election
| Party | Candidate | Votes | % | ±% |
|---|---|---|---|---|
| New Democratic | April ChiefCalf | 3,576 | 49.56 | +12.26 |
| Saskatchewan | David Buckingham | 3,502 | 48.53 | –10.17 |
| Green | Jupiter Neault | 138 | 1.91 | –0.49 |
| Total valid votes | | 7,216 | 98.90 | –0.36 |
| Total rejected ballots | | 88 | 1.20 | +0.36 |
| Turnout | | 7,304 | | |
| Eligible voters | | – | | |
Source: Elections Saskatchewan

2020 provincial election redistributed results
| Party | % |
|---|---|
| Saskatchewan | 58.7 |
| New Democratic | 37.3 |
| Green | 2.4 |
| Liberal | 1.5 |
| Progressive Conservative | 0.1 |

2020 Saskatchewan general election
| Party | Candidate | Votes | % | ±% |
|---|---|---|---|---|
| Saskatchewan | David Buckingham | 4,322 | 54.29 | +5.22 |
| New Democratic | Malik Draz | 3,260 | 40.96 | -5.38 |
| Green | Glenn Wright | 229 | 2.88 | +1.32 |
| Liberal | Robert Rudachyk | 149 | 1.87 | -1.16 |
| Total valid votes | | 7,960 | 99.16 | |
| Total rejected ballots | | 67 | 0.84 | +0.63 |
| Turnout | | 8,027 | 51.23 | -3.87 |
| Eligible voters | | 15,670 | | |
| Saskatchewan hold | | Swing | | – |
Source: Elections Saskatchewan

2016 Saskatchewan general election
| Party | Candidate | Votes | % |
|---|---|---|---|
| Saskatchewan | David Buckingham | 3,892 | 49.07 |
| New Democratic | Cam Broten | 3,675 | 46.34 |
| Liberal | Naveed Anwar | 240 | 3.03 |
| Green | Tammy McDonald | 124 | 1.56 |
| Total valid votes | | 7,931 | 99.79 |
| Total rejected ballots | | 17 | 0.21 |
| Turnout | | 7,948 | 55.10 |
| Eligible voters | | 14,425 | |
Source: Elections Saskatchewan

== See also ==
- List of Saskatchewan provincial electoral districts
- List of Saskatchewan general elections
- Canadian provincial electoral districts
