= Eric Olauson =

Canadian politician

Member of the Saskatchewan Legislative Assembly for Saskatoon University
- In office April 4, 2016 – September 29, 2020
- Preceded by: Riding Established
- Succeeded by: Jennifer Bowes

Saskatoon City Councillor for Ward 8
- In office 2012–2016
- Preceded by: Glen Penner
- Succeeded by: Sarina Gersher
- Constituency: Ward 8

Personal details
- Party: Saskatchewan Party

Eric Olauson is a Canadian politician. A member of the Saskatchewan Party, Olauson was elected to the Legislative Assembly of Saskatchewan in the 2016 provincial election for the district of Saskatoon University, and served one term before being defeated in the 2020 provincial election. Prior to his time in the Legislature, he was the Ward 8 councillor on Saskatoon City Council from 2012 to 2016.

== Political career ==
=== Saskatoon City Council ===
Olauson's first bid for a seat on Saskatoon City Council came in a 2011 by-election in Ward 3. A self-described "fiscal and social conservative", he finished last out of seven candidates. The following year, he successfully ran for the vacant Ward 8 seat in the 2012 municipal election. During the subsequent term, Olauson and Ward 5 councillor Randy Donauer earned reputations as the "fiscal hawks" on city council. Olauson frequently questioned the costs of proposed projects and argued against increasing regulations. He unsuccessfully proposed ending funding for public art in new infrastructure projects.

In 2015, Olauson voted against banning corporate and union donations to city council candidates, an independent recommendation that was defeated by a 7–4 count. In 2016, Olauson drew attention to lax rules around councillors' communications allowances when he charged four football jerseys, at a value of $440, against the allowance.

In 2016, before the end of his term, Olauson became the Saskatchewan Party candidate for the newly established district of Saskatoon University ahead of the 2016 provincial election. When Olauson was elected, he resigned as city councillor.

=== Saskatchewan Party MLA ===
Olauson was elected a Member of the Legislative Assembly (MLA) by a margin of 348 votes over the New Democratic Party's (NDP) Jennifer Bowes, making it one of the closest races in the election. Olauson was a backbencher serving on a number of caucus committees, including the Standing Committee on Intergovernmental Affairs and Justice, the Caucus Management Committee, and the Private Bills House Committee. Olauson also spent time as chair of the Saskatchewan Party caucus.

In 2017, Olauson participated in anti-abortion March for Life protests in Ottawa. In 2019, as caucus chair, Olauson ordered caucus members not to post on social media or talk with media about caucus member Greg Ottenbreit's anti-abortion views after Ottenbreit delivered a speech promising to fight to block abortion access.

Olauson stood for re-election in 2020. He was defeated by Bowes in a re-match of the 2016 race.

=== Failed school trustee bid ===
In 2024, Olauson stood for election as a trustee for the Separate (Catholic) school board. Olauson was endorsed by the anti-abortion Campaign Life Coalition as a "pro-life, pro-family" option. Olauson's bid was unsuccessful.

== Controversies ==
It was revealed during the 2016 provincial election campaign that Olauson had two convictions for impaired driving from 1992 and 1993, which were not disclosed during his time as a city councilor.

Olauson drew controversy in the summer of 2016, months after being elected MLA, for social media posts. This included liking a meme about "slapping the shit" out of Justin Trudeau supporters and liking pages called "Boobszone" and "Cold Dead Hands", the latter an American gun rights page. While the Opposition NDP called for his resignation, Olauson was ordered by the Saskatchewan Party to stay off of social media and was removed from one of his committee seats.

In 2017, Olauson was directed to apologize after ordering a background check and promising an "epic" reply to a constituent who had written to voice concerns regarding provincial budget cuts to libraries and municipal grants. Olauson accidentally used the 'reply all' function, which meant the constituent received the message intended only for Olauson's constituency assistant. In addition to the apology, Olauson was removed from the board of the Meewasin Valley Authority. Olauson claimed to have "mistyped" in his response.

== Personal life ==
Olauson was born and raised in Saskatoon. Prior to entering politics, he worked as an information technology manager. Olauson has been married twice and divorced twice and has two biological children with his first wife.

== Electoral results ==
2020 Saskatchewan general election: Saskatoon University
Party	Candidate	Votes	%
New Democratic	Jennifer Bowes	3,225	52.97
Saskatchewan	Eric Olauson	2,730	44.84
Green	Erickka Patmore	133	2.19
Total		6,088	100.0
Source: Elections Saskatchewan

2016 Saskatchewan general election: Saskatoon University
Party	Candidate	Votes	%
Saskatchewan	Eric Olauson	3,080	48.03
New Democratic	Jennifer Bowes	2,732	42.61
Liberal	Ezaz Jaseem	370	5.77
Green	Garnet Hall	129	2.01
Progressive Conservative	Rose Buscholl	101	1.58
Total		6,412	100.0
Source: Saskatchewan Archives - Election Results by Electoral Division; Elections Saskatchewan
