= David Buckingham (politician) =

Canadian politician

Member of the Legislative Assembly of Saskatchewan for Saskatoon Westview
- In office April 4, 2016 – October 1, 2024
- Preceded by: Cam Broten
- Succeeded by: April ChiefCalf

Personal details
- Born: Shellbrook, Saskatchewan
- Party: Saskatchewan Party
- Profession: Commercial truck driver

David Buckingham is a Canadian politician, who served as a member of the Legislative Assembly of Saskatchewan from 2016 to 2024, representing the district of Saskatoon Westview as a member of the Saskatchewan Party.

== Early life ==
Buckingham was born and raised in Shellbrook, Saskatchewan. He moved to Saskatoon in 1979 and then the village of Borden in 1988. There he worked as a commercial truck driver, and raised three children with his wife Karen. Buckingham also worked as a volunteer firefighter.

== Political career ==
Buckingham's first foray into politics was at the municipal level. He served one year on the Borden council before serving two terms as mayor from 2009 to 2015. He resigned as mayor after receiving the Saskatchewan Party nomination for the new Saskatoon Westview district ahead of the 2016 provincial election. Buckingham stated that his interest in provincial politics stemmed from working with the government on flood relief in Borden in 2013.

In the 2016 election, Buckingham pulled off an upset by defeating Cam Broten, leader of the Saskatchewan New Democratic Party (NDP), by a narrow margin of 232 votes. Buckingham was re-elected by a wider margin in the 2020 provincial election, taking 54% of the tally in Saskatoon Westview. During his time in the government caucus, Buckingham was a backbench MLA and served a stint as government caucus chair.

In the 2024 provincial election, Buckingham was unseated by April ChiefCalf of the NDP in another close race—in the final tally, Buckingham was defeated by a margin of 74 votes. In the lead-up to the election, it was revealed by former Speaker Randy Weekes that Buckingham had used a racial slur in a 2023 caucus meeting. Buckingham was reported by a staffer, who later quit; Buckingham was required to undertake sensitivity training as a result. After the incident came to light, Buckingham publicly apologized, calling it a "really dumb mistake".

== Election results ==
2024 Saskatchewan general election: Saskatoon Westview
Party	Candidate	Votes	%
New Democratic	April ChiefCalf	3,576	49.56
Saskatchewan	David Buckingham	3,502	48.53
Green	Jupiter Neault	138	1.91
Total		7,216	100.00
Source: Elections Saskatchewan

2020 Saskatchewan general election: Saskatoon Westview
Party	Candidate	Votes	%
Saskatchewan	David Buckingham	4,322	54.30
New Democratic	Malik Draz	3,260	40.95
Green	Glenn Wright	229	2.88
Liberal	Robert Rudachyk	149	1.87
Total		7,960	100.0
Source: Elections Saskatchewan

2016 Saskatchewan general election: Saskatoon Westview
Party	Candidate	Votes	%
Saskatchewan	David Buckingham	3,892	49.07
New Democratic	Cam Broten	3,675	46.34
Liberal	Naveed Anwar	240	3.03
Green	Tammy McDonald	124	1.56
Total		7,931	100.0
Source: Saskatchewan Archives - Election Results by Electoral Division; Elections Saskatchewan
