= Randy Weekes =

Canadian politician (born 1956)

The Honourable Randy Weekes ECS

28th Speaker of the Legislative Assembly of Saskatchewan
- In office November 30, 2020 – November 25, 2024
- Preceded by: Mark Docherty
- Succeeded by: Todd Goudy

Member of the Legislative Assembly of Saskatchewan for Biggar-Sask Valley Biggar (2003–2016) Redberry Lake (1999–2003)
- In office September 16, 1999 – October 1, 2024
- Preceded by: Walter Jess
- Succeeded by: Constituency abolished

Personal details
- Born: 1956 (age 69–70)
- Party: New Democratic Party (2025-present)
- Other political affiliations: Independent (2024-2025) Saskatchewan Party (until 2024)

Randall Percival Weekes (born 1956) is a Canadian politician. He was a Saskatchewan Party member of the Legislative Assembly of Saskatchewan from 1999 until 2024, representing the constituencies of Redberry Lake, Biggar, and Biggar-Sask Valley. He served as the Speaker of the Legislative Assembly from 2020 until 2024.

== Early life ==
Weekes was born in Biggar, Saskatchewan, where he lived on a ranch. He attended the University of Saskatchewan.

== Political career ==
Weekes was first elected to the Saskatchewan Legislature in the 1999 provincial election as a member of the fledgling Saskatchewan Party, a new conservative party established in 1997 by a coalition of former Progressive Conservative and Liberal MLAs and under the leadership of former Reform Party Member of Parliament Elwin Hermanson. Weekes was re-elected five times during his political career, before losing a contested nomination ahead of the 2024 provincial election. When the Saskatchewan Party won the 2007 election under the leadership of Brad Wall, Weekes was appointed government whip. Weekes later served a stint in cabinet from 2012 to 2014 in the newly established ministry of Rural and Remote Health. Following the 2020 election, which the party won under the leadership of Scott Moe, Weekes was elected Speaker of the Legislative Assembly over former Speaker Mark Docherty.

Weekes was noted for promoting anti-abortion views. Weekes attended anti-abortion March for Life rallies in both Regina and Ottawa. In the 2018 Saskatchewan Party leadership election to replace Wall—which was ultimately won by Moe—Weekes supported Ken Cheveldayoff, who was endorsed as the top-rated candidate by an anti-abortion lobby group.

In December 2023, Weekes, one of the longest serving members of the Legislature, lost a contested nomination for the 2024 election in the new riding of Kindersley-Biggar to newcomer Kim Gartner.

=== Saskatchewan Party resignation ===
At the end of the 2024 Spring sitting of the Legislature, Weekes made a series of allegations in the House about harassment and bullying within the Saskatchewan Party caucus, including allegations of intimidation aimed at him in his role as Speaker from Government House Leaders and MLAs. Recalling the oath of impartiality he took upon assuming the Speaker role, Weekes alleged that Saskatchewan Party members, including House Leader Jeremy Harrison, deputy House Leader Lori Carr, and finance minister Donna Harpauer, tried to "influence" his rulings; Weekes read into the record several text messages from the MLAs and told reporters that party leadership "wanted me to do whatever they wanted." In addition, Weekes alleged that Harrison had at one time brought a gun into the Legislative Building, a charge that Harrison initially denied but later admitted. Weekes also read a letter from the House's former sergeant-at-arms, Terry Quinn, that alleged harassment and defamation by government members, including corrections minister Christine Tell.

In the aftermath of the allegations, Weekes criticized the direction of the Saskatchewan Party under Moe, stating that the party had "lurched to the right", citing its 2023 Parents' Bill of Rights, which placed restrictions on sexual health education and regulated the use of pronouns in schools, as an example. In response, Moe called all of the allegations "sour grapes" after Weekes lost his nomination bid; Weekes replied that the loss merely meant that he had nothing to lose politically by revealing the allegations.

On May 15, Weekes posted a photo on social media of his Saskatchewan Party membership card cut into pieces, along with the caption "Enough is Enough". Weekes officially resigned from the Saskatchewan Party caucus on June 24, which left him to sit as an independent member. He decided not to stand for re-election, but in the lead-up to the fall election, Weekes publicly endorsed Carla Beck and the New Democratic Party. At the time of that endorsement, Weekes also alleged that Saskatchewan Party MLA David Buckingham had used a racial slur in a caucus meeting, to which Buckingham then publicly admitted and apologized for.

== Electoral results ==
2020 Saskatchewan general election: Biggar-Sask Valley
Party	Candidate	Votes	%
Saskatchewan	Randy Weekes	5,775	73.52
New Democratic	Twyla Harris Naciri	1,193	15.19
Buffalo	Trevor Simpson	698	8.88
Green	Darcy Robilliard	189	2.41
Total valid votes		7,855	100.00
Source: Elections Saskatchewan

2016 Saskatchewan general election: Biggar-Sask Valley
Party	Candidate	Votes	%
Saskatchewan	Randy Weekes	5,972	76.75
New Democratic	Dan Richert	1,453	18.67
Liberal	Faiza Kanwal	194	2.49
Green	Ryan Lamarche	162	2.08
Total valid votes		7,781	100.00
Source: Saskatchewan Archives - Election Results by Electoral Division; Elections Saskatchewan

2011 Saskatchewan general election: Biggar
Party	Candidate	Votes	%
Saskatchewan	Randy Weekes	4,493	68.15
New Democratic	Glenn Wright	1,695	25.71
Green	Darryl Amey	206	3.12
Progressive Conservative	James Yanchyshen	171	2.59
Western Independence	Dana Arnason	28	0.43
Total valid votes		6,593	100.00
Source: Saskatchewan Archives - Election Results by Electoral Division

2007 Saskatchewan general election: Biggar
Party	Candidate	Votes	%
Saskatchewan	Randy Weekes	4,499	59.93
New Democratic	Ken Crush	2,311	30.78
Liberal	Nathan Jeffries	493	6.57
Green	Darryl Amey	204	2.72
Total valid votes		7,507	100.00
Source: Saskatchewan Archives - Election Results by Electoral Division

2003 Saskatchewan general election: Biggar
Party	Candidate	Votes	%
Saskatchewan	Randy Weekes	3,917	53.61
New Democratic	Lee W. Pearce	2,639	36.11
Liberal	Nathan Jeffries	751	10.28
Total valid votes		7,307	100.00
Source: Saskatchewan Archives - Election Results by Electoral Division

1999 Saskatchewan general election: Redberry Lake
Party	Candidate	Votes	%
Saskatchewan	Randy Weekes	3,860	51.54
New Democratic	Walter W. Jess	2,444	32.38
Liberal	Harry Lewchuk	1,082	14.33
New Green	Ivan Olynyk	162	2.15
Total valid votes		7,548	100.00
Source: Saskatchewan Archives - Election Results by Electoral Division

== Cabinet positions ==
Saskatchewan provincial government of Brad Wall
Cabinet post (1)
Predecessor	Office	Successor
Ministry Established	Minister of Rural and Remote Health; May 25, 2012 – June 5, 2014	Tim McMillan
