= Stonebridge, Saskatoon =

Stonebridge
- Neighbourhood
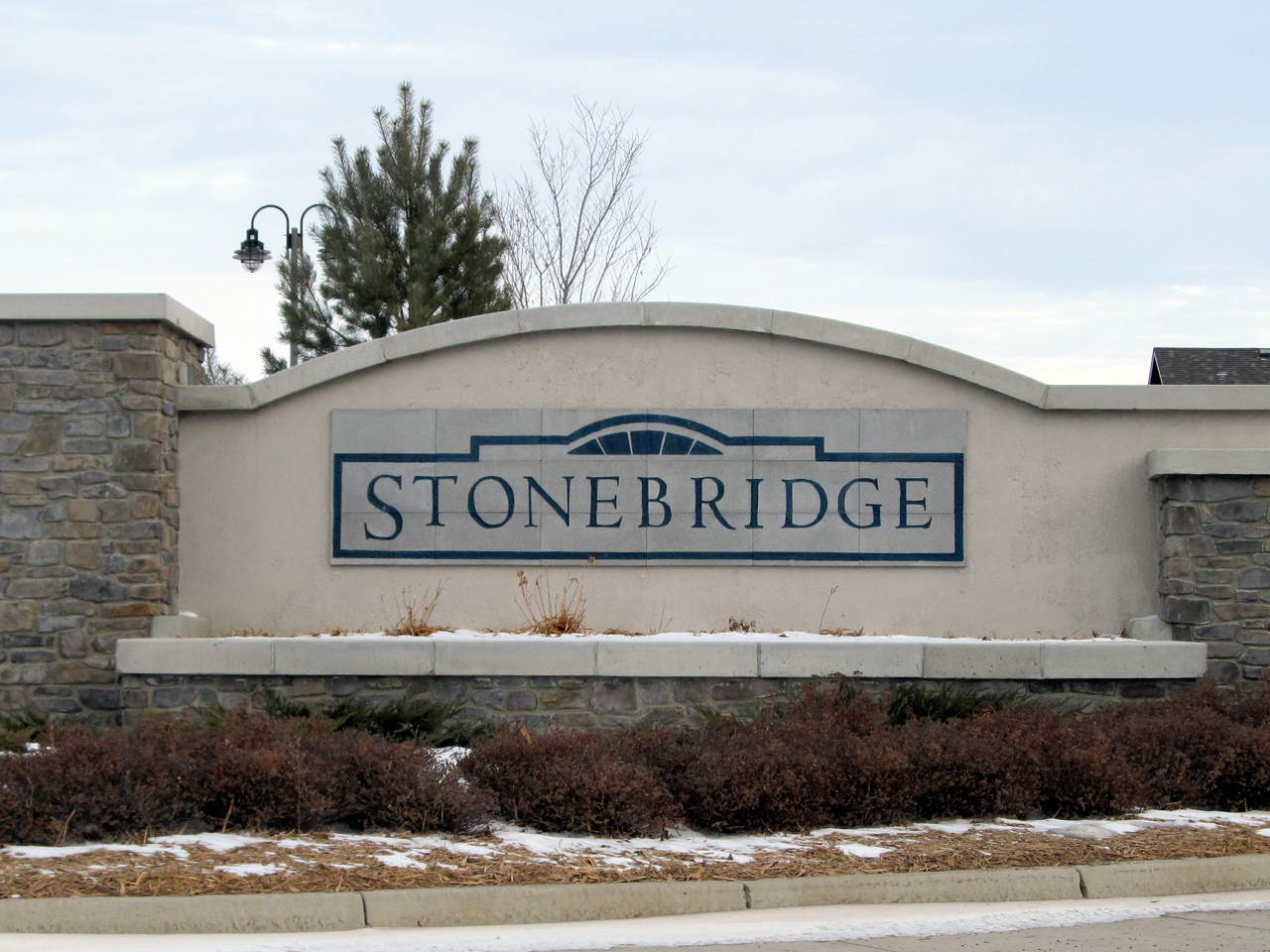
- Stonebrige neighbourhood sign

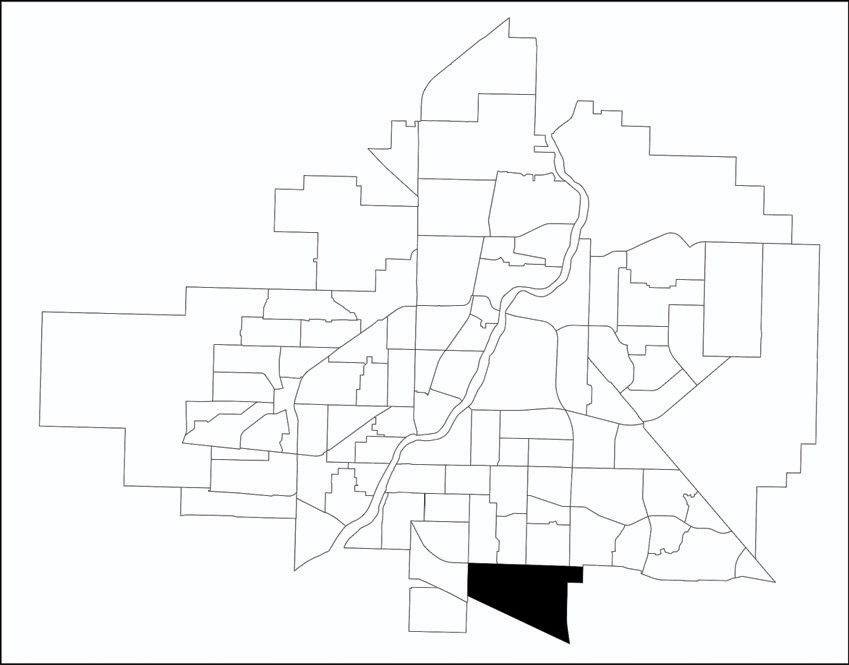
- Stonebridge location in Saskatoon
- Coordinates: 52°4′46″N 106°37′29″W
- Country: Canada
- Province: Saskatchewan
- City: Saskatoon
- Suburban Development Area: Nutana
- Neighbourhood: Stonebridge
- Construction: 2005–2017

Government
  - Type: Municipal (Ward 7)
  - Administrative body: Saskatoon City Council
  - Councillor: Mairin Loewen

Area
  - Total: 1.5 km^{2} (0.58 sq mi)

Population (2019)
  - Total: 13,334
  - Density: 8,900/km^{2} (23,000/sq mi)
  - Average Income: $50,720
- Time zone: UTC-6 (UTC)
- Website: ourstonebridge.ca

Stonebridge is a mostly residential neighbourhood located in south-central Saskatoon, Saskatchewan, Canada. It is a suburban subdivision, consisting of low-density, single detached dwellings and a mix of medium-density apartment and semi-detached dwellings. As of 2009, the area is home to 994 residents. The neighbourhood is considered a middle-income area, with an average family income of $67,642, an average dwelling value of $321,004 and a home ownership rate of 72.4%.

== History ==
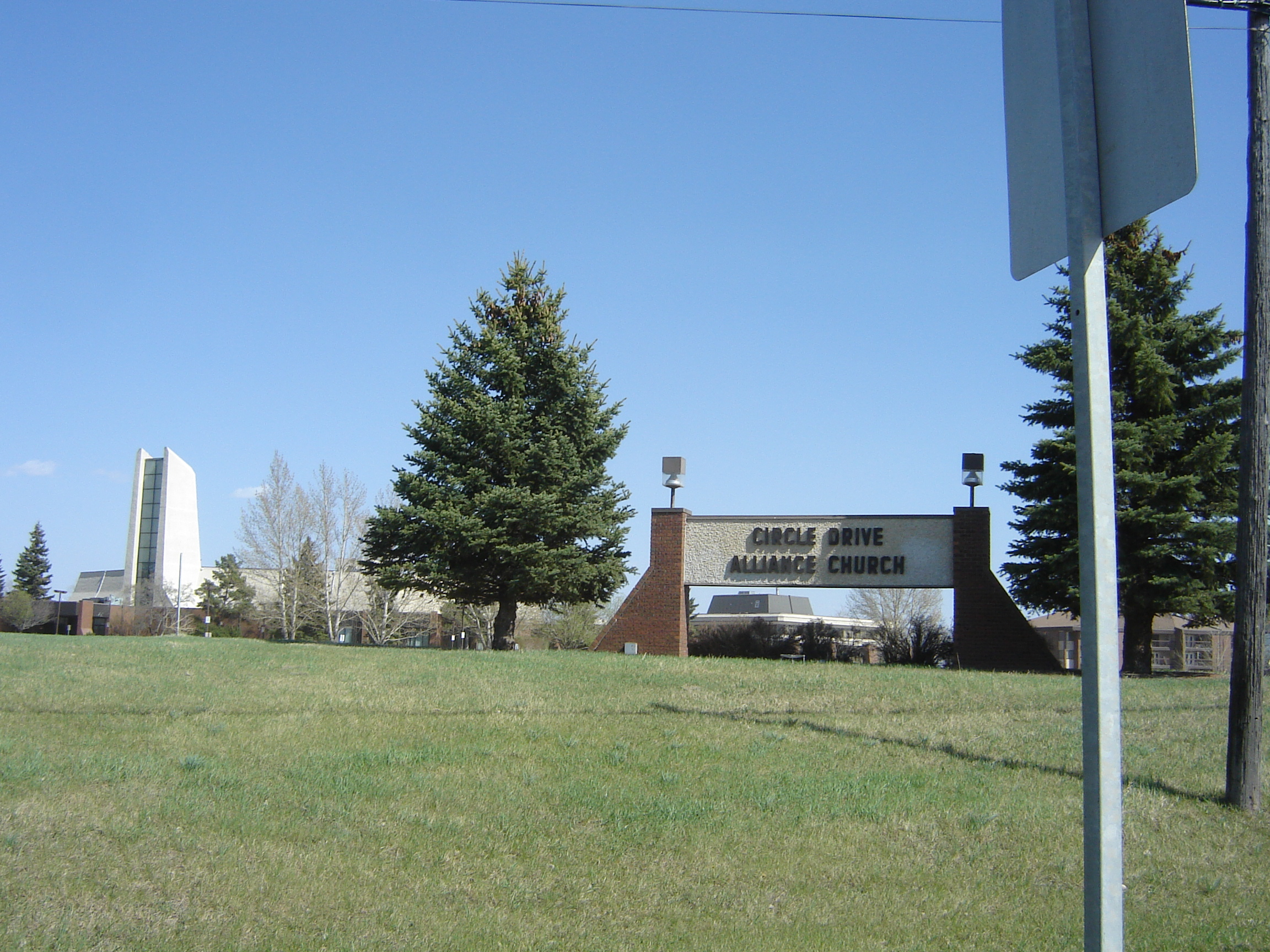
Circle Drive Alliance Church

The first development in the area occurred with the purchase of land in 1976 by the University Drive Alliance Church. The congregation moved into their newly built facility, Circle Drive Alliance Church, in November 1979. Two adjacent buildings, a personal care home and senior citizens' home, were completed in 1986.

The city formally annexed the land in the 1980s., though some of the northern portions of the community closest to Circle Drive were actually annexed much earlier: 1959 for lands east of Preston Avenue, and 1966 for lands to the west. However, development did not begin until 2005, with the construction of the Stonegate Shopping Centre. Stonegate's development was tied to the construction of an overpass at Clarence Avenue South over Circle Drive. Home building began at about the same time as the Stonegate construction. The Clarence Avenue interchange was completed and opened to traffic on November 20, 2007. Another interchange at Preston Avenue was constructed as part of the South Circle Drive project. The neighbourhood reached full buildout in late 2015, nearly seven years ahead of schedule. A limited access (southbound-in; northbound-out) interchange linking Highway 11 and Circle Drive with Vic Boulevard, opened in 2017, adding another point of entrance and egress for Stonebridge.

=== Street naming controversies ===
In 2007, Saskatoon City Council approved the naming of one street, Alm Crescent, after Terry Alm, who had only recently ended his tenure as a city councilor in order to enter provincial politics. Residents and some councilors expressed upset that Alm's name was chosen over other longstanding naming candidates on a list maintained by the city for future street names; the list included former mayors, 50 other former councilors, and onetime Saskatoon resident, Joni Mitchell. The decision sparked a motion by one councilor to impose a 10-year waiting period on naming streets after recently departed politicians.

Prior to 2016, one of the streets in the area was named Victor Road, prior to the opening of the interchange at Highway 11. The roadway was renamed Vic Boulevard as a result of another roadway off the highway in the R. M. of Corman Park being named Victor Road, located 10 kilometres south of the interchange. The name change was necessary in order to avoid confusion for emergency services and delivery personnel. Victor Place, a cul-de-sac located off Vic Boulevard was allowed to keep its original street name.

== Government and politics ==
Stonebridge exists within the federal electoral district of Saskatoon—Grasswood. It is currently represented by Kevin Waugh of the Conservative Party of Canada, first elected in 2015.

Provincially, the area is within the constituency of Saskatoon Stonebridge-Dakota. It is currently represented by Bronwyn Eyre of the Saskatchewan Party, first elected in 2016.

In Saskatoon's non-partisan municipal politics, Stonebridge lies within Ward 7. It is currently represented by Councillor Mairin Loewen, who was elected to city council in a 2011 by-election.

== Institutions ==
=== Education ===
Chief Whitecap School
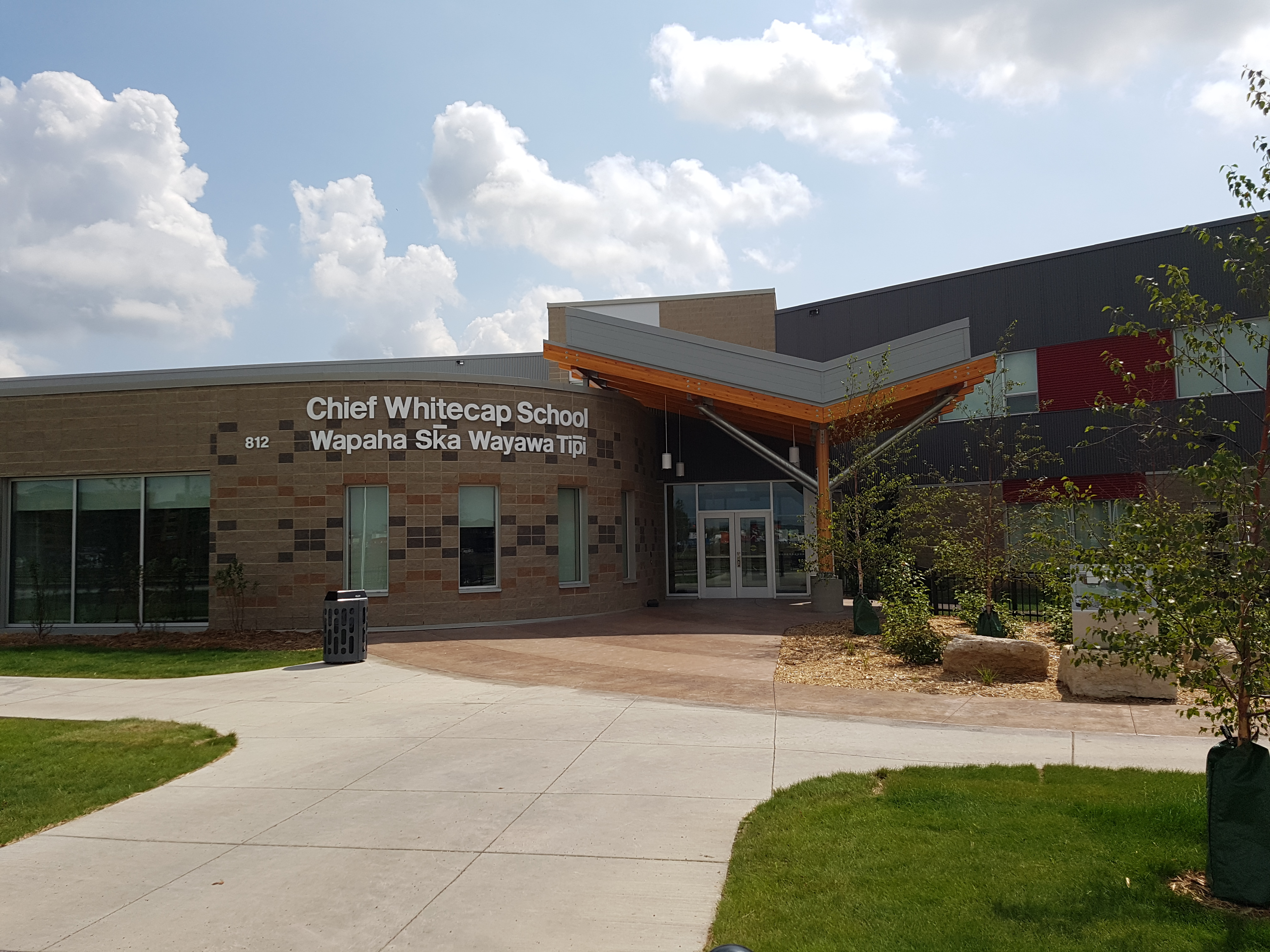
- 812 Gordon Road; Saskatoon, Saskatchewan, S7T 0J5; Canada

Information
- Type: Elementary
- Opened: 2017
- School board: Saskatoon Public School Division
- Principal: Harold Robertson
- Grades: Kindergarten to Grade 8
- Enrollment: 1,025 (2022)
- Education system: Public
- Language: English
- Feeder to: Walter Murray Collegiate
- Website: Chief Whitecap School

St. Kateri Tekakwitha Catholic School
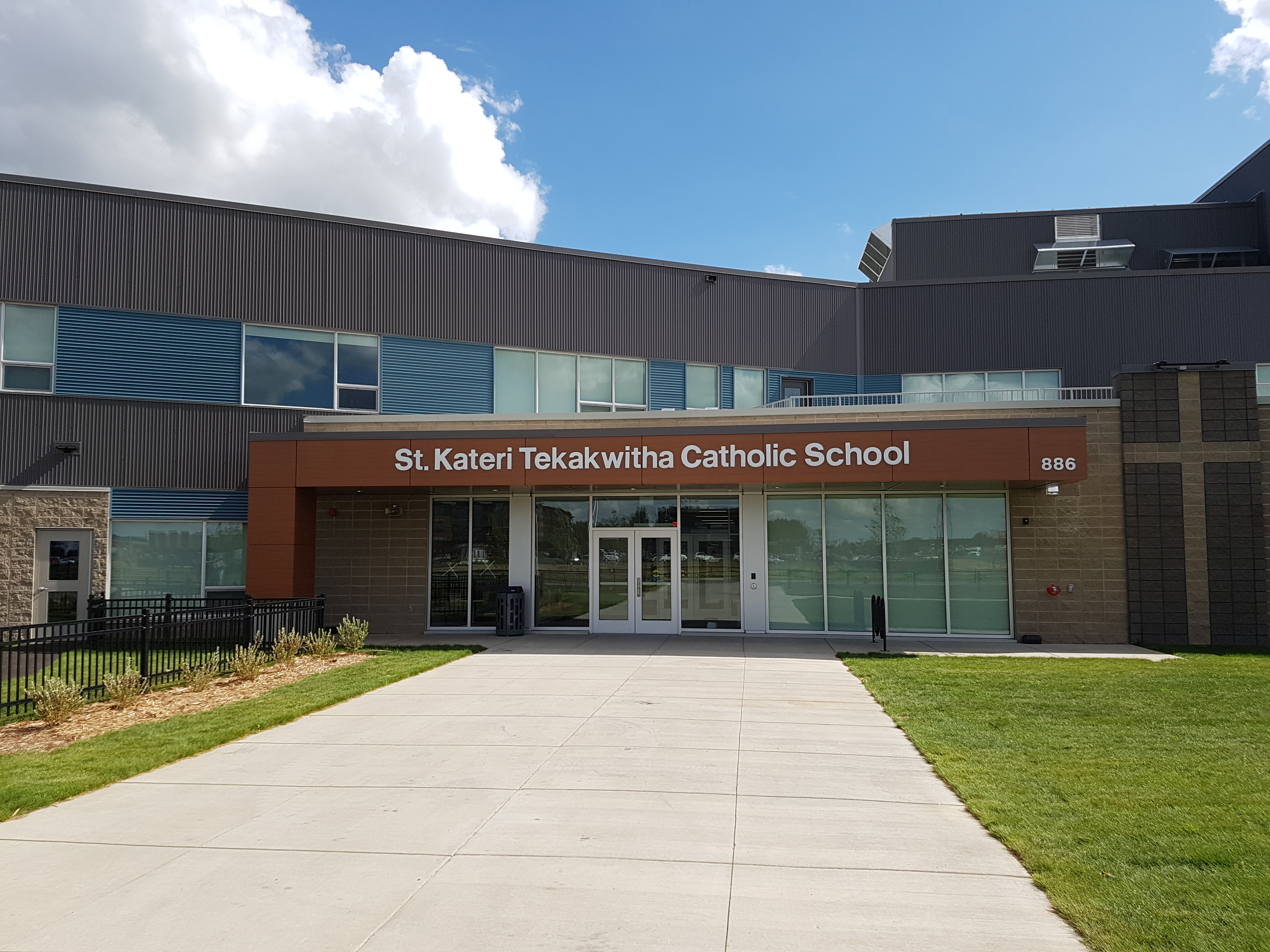
- 886 Gordon Road; Saskatoon, Saskatchewan, S7T 0J5; Canada

Information
- Type: Elementary
- Religious affiliation: Catholic
- Opened: 2017
- School board: Greater Saskatoon Catholic Schools
- Principal: Kent Gauthier
- Staff: 74 (2023)
- Grades: Kindergarten to Grade 8
- Enrollment: 328 (2017)
- Education system: Separate
- Language: English
- Colours: Blue, Yellow, Red, White, Green
- Team name: St. Kateri Hawks
- Feeder to: Holy Cross High School
- Website: St. Kateri Tekakwitha Catholic School

As of September 2017, two elementary schools exist in Stonebridge. On October 22, 2013, the provincial government announced funding for four new P3 facilities in Saskatoon, including a joint-use public/separate school facility in Stonebridge. Greater Saskatoon Catholic Schools revealed in June 2015 that the division's new elementary school in Stonebridge would be named after Kateri Tekakwitha, while Saskatoon Public Schools announced in October 2016 that its new elementary school would be named after Chief Whitecap, one of the founders of Saskatoon. Both schools were completed ahead of the 2017–2018 school year.

=== Other ===
Samaritan Place, a long-term care facility operated by Amicus Health Care Inc., a subsidiary of the Catholic Health Ministry of Saskatchewan, is currently under construction.

The Circle Drive Alliance Church and associated senior residence were constructed in 1986, southeast of Preston Avenue and Circle Drive. It predated the development of Stonebridge by nearly a quarter century.

== Parks and recreation ==
- Alexander MacGillivray Young Park – 9.9 acres (4.0 ha)
- Alfred Bence Park – 0.3 acres (0.12 ha)
- Blair Nelson Park – 4.3 acres (1.7 ha)
- Cecil A. Wheaton Park – 0.4 acres (0.16 ha)
- Donald Koyl Park – 0.5 acres (0.20 ha)
- Evelyn G. Edwards Park – 0.5 acres (0.20 ha)
- Howard Harding Park – 0.8 acres (0.32 ha)
- John Cameron Park – 0.4 acres (0.16 ha)
- Mark Thompson Park – 3.4 acres (1.4 ha)
- Marshall Hawthorne Park – 8.2 acres (3.3 ha)
- Oren Willson Park – 0.5 acres (0.20 ha)
- Owen Mann Park – 0.5 acres (0.20 ha)
- Patricia Roe Park – 0.8 acres (0.32 ha)
- Peter Zakreski Park – 20.2 acres (8.2 ha)
- Robert H. Freeland Park – 0.7 acres (0.28 ha)
- Walter Wood Park – 0.3 acres (0.12 ha)
- William Anderson Park – 0.3 acres (0.12 ha)

The Stonebridge Community Association was formed in 2009 to advocate on civic and property development matters, and run affordable sport and recreation programs for children, youth and adults.

The Willows golf course is located immediately southwest of the community.

== Public services ==
Stonebridge is a part of the east division of the Saskatoon Police Services patrol system. Saskatoon Fire & Protective Services' east division covers the neighbourhood. Transit services to Stonebridge are provided by Saskatoon Transit on route No. 17 (University – Stonebridge via Clarence).

== Commercial ==
At present, the major commercial district of Stonebridge is the Stonegate Shopping Centre, a big box commercial development in the northwest corner that includes Walmart. Additional businesses are located west of Stonegate in an area called the Stonebridge Business Park, straddling Stonebridge Boulevard. Other mixed-used districts that include retail space are planned for the center of the neighbourhood. The Saskatoon Auto Mall, a collection of vehicle dealerships, is located immediately west of the community. The nearest enclosed shopping centre is Market Mall, approximately a kilometre to the north.

The Stonebridge commercial area includes new hotel development, marking the first time since the 1970s that new hotel accommodation has been constructed east of the river, following the closure of most hotels and motels along 8th Street between the 1970s and 1990s in deference to retail development.

As early as 1972, there were plans to construct an enclosed shopping mall on the west side of Clarence Avenue, just west of today's Walmart and adjacent shopping, on the site currently occupied by the Saskatoon Auto Mall. Due to no residential development being planned nearby for many years (indeed such development did not begin in earnest until the mid-2000s), and other concerns, City Council rejected the proposal. The developers built their mall, today known as Confederation Mall on Saskatoon's west side.

Stonegate is an open-air shopping centre located on Clarence Avenue South and Circle Drive, across the road from the Saskatoon Auto Mall.

== Location ==
Stonebridge is located within the Nutana Suburban Development Area. It is bounded by Highway 11 to the east, Clarence Avenue to the west, Circle Drive to the north, and the Canadian National Railway tracks and southern city limits to the south. Streets are laid out in a typical hierarchy of arterial, collector and local roads. There are no bicycle lanes or pedestrian paths into the neighbourhood. Primary access is via Clarence and Preston avenues from the north, Circle Drive from east and west, Melville Street from the west, and Vic Boulevard off Highway 11 from the east (the Vic Blvd access is only available to southbound highway traffic at the present time).
