= Saskatoon Stonebridge-Dakota =

Provincial electoral district in Saskatchewan, Canada

Saskatchewan electoral district

Defunct provincial electoral district
- Legislature: Legislative Assembly of Saskatchewan
- District created: 2013
- First contested: 2016
- Last contested: 2020

Demographics
- Census division: 11
- Census subdivision: Saskatoon

Saskatoon Stonebridge-Dakota was a provincial electoral district for the Legislative Assembly of Saskatchewan, Canada. It was first contested in the 2016 election.

== History ==
The district was created as a mixed urban/rural district for the 2016 general election, and includes the Saskatoon neighbourhood of Stonebridge. The riding was dissolved before the 2024 general election; the urban portion was moved to Saskatoon Stonebridge while the rural area became part of Dakota-Arm River.

== Members of the Legislative Assembly ==
Legislature	Years	Member	Party
District created from Saskatoon Southeast
28th	2016–2020	Bronwyn Eyre	Saskatchewan Party
29th	2020–2024	Bronwyn Eyre	Saskatchewan Party
District dissolved into Saskatoon Stonebridge and Dakota-Arm River

== Election results ==
2020 Saskatchewan general election
Party	Candidate	Votes	%	±%
Saskatchewan	Bronwyn Eyre	7,584	67.17	-2.79
New Democratic	Judicaël Moukoumi	3,083	27.31	+2.87
Buffalo	Brett Gregg	334	2.96	–
Green	Lydia Martens	289	2.56	+0.98
Total valid votes		11,290	99.11	
Total rejected ballots		101	0.89	–
Turnout		11,391	–	–
Eligible voters		–		
Saskatchewan hold		Swing		–
Source: Elections Saskatchewan

2016 Saskatchewan general election
Party	Candidate	Votes	%	±%
Saskatchewan	Bronwyn Eyre	6,584	69.96	–
New Democratic	Steve Jimbo	2,300	24.44	–
Liberal	Kevin Ber	377	4.00	–
Green	Michelle Wendzina	149	1.58	–
Total valid votes		9,410	100.0	
Eligible voters		–		
Source: Elections Saskatchewan

== See also ==
- List of Saskatchewan provincial electoral districts
- List of Saskatchewan general elections
- Canadian provincial electoral districts
