= Ministry of Finance (Saskatchewan) =

- Le ministère des Finances

Organization overview
- Minister responsible: Jim Reiter
- Parent Organization: Government of Saskatchewan
- Website: www.finance.gov.sk.ca

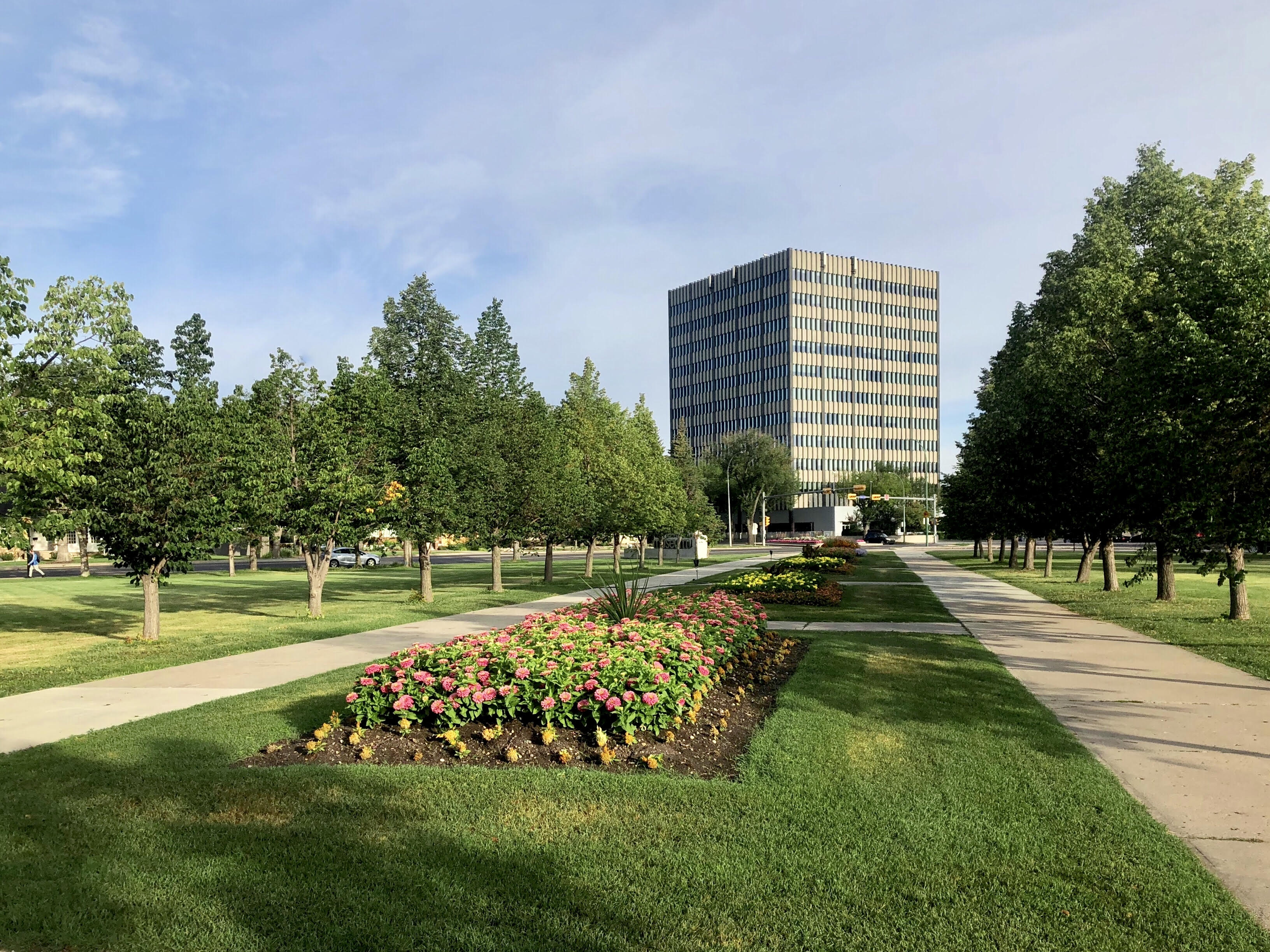
Photo of the Ministry of Finance

The Ministry of Finance is a ministry responsible for the financing, revenue and expenses of the Government of Saskatchewan in order to enhance the fiscal strength of the Province. In addition to the financial budgeting role, the ministry is also responsible for the administration of pension plans, procurement, advising government/cabinet on human resources, pandemic government continuousness planning, and support services such as communication systems.
