= Tajinder Grewal =

Canadian politician

Member of the Saskatchewan Legislative Assembly for Saskatoon University-Sutherland
- Incumbent
- Assumed office October 28, 2024
- Preceded by: Jennifer Bowes

Shadow Minister of Advanced Education
- Incumbent
- Assumed office November 13, 2024
- Preceded by: Jennifer Bowes

Personal details
- Born: India
- Party: Saskatchewan NDP
- Education: Punjab Agricultural University

Tajinder Grewal is a Canadian politician who was elected to the Legislative Assembly of Saskatchewan in the 2024 general election, representing Saskatoon University-Sutherland as a member of the New Democratic Party.

== Career ==
Grewal attended Punjab Agricultural University, where he earned a PhD in plant science. After completing his studies he remained at the university as a professor from 1993 to 1999. In 1999, Grewal immigrated to Canada. He worked as a researcher at the University of Saskatchewan and the Saskatchewan Research Council before becoming chief scientist and head of genomics at SGS Canada. From 2010 to 2012, he served as president of the Punjabi Cultural Association of Saskatchewan.

Grewal was elected to the Legislative Assembly of Saskatchewan in the 2024 general election in the constituency of Saskatoon University-Sutherland. Alongside Bhajan Brar, Grewal became the first turban-wearing Sikh to be elected to the Legislative Assembly.

== Electoral record ==
2024 Saskatchewan general election: Saskatoon University-Sutherland
Party	Candidate	Votes	%	±%
New Democratic	Tajinder Grewal	3,960	55.92	+5.92
Saskatchewan	Ghislaine McLeod	2,662	37.59	-10.41
Saskatchewan United	Dawne Badrock	312	4.41	–
Green	Felipe Guerra	147	2.08	+0.08
Total valid votes		7,081	98.88	
Total rejected ballots		80	1.12	
Turnout		7,161	59.52	
Eligible voters		12,032		
Source: Elections Saskatchewan
