= Bronwyn Eyre =

Canadian politician

The Honourable Bronwyn Eyre ECS

Member of the Saskatchewan Legislative Assembly for Saskatoon Stonebridge-Dakota
- In office April 4, 2016 – October 1, 2024
- Preceded by: Riding established
- Succeeded by: Riding abolished

Personal details
- Born: March 13, 1971 (age 55) Saskatoon, Saskatchewan
- Party: Saskatchewan Party
- Profession: Media

Bronwyn Olivia Eyre is a Canadian politician. Eyre is a former member of the Legislative Assembly of Saskatchewan (MLA), a role in which she represented the electoral district of Saskatoon Stonebridge-Dakota from 2016 to 2024 as a member of the Saskatchewan Party. She was the Minister of Justice and Attorney General for Saskatchewan, the first woman to hold that position.

== Early life and career ==
Eyre attended McGill University and graduated from the University of Saskatchewan with a law degree in 1996. She established a career in radio broadcasting with News Talk 650 and CJME in Saskatchewan and as a columnist with the Saskatoon StarPhoenix and the Calgary Herald. Before entering provincial politics, Eyre was a Saskatoon public school board trustee.

== Political career ==
Eyre was first elected in the 2016 provincial election in the newly established riding of Saskatoon Stonebridge-Dakota. Eyre was re-elected in the 2020 provincial election. In the 2024 provincial election, she stood for election in the new riding of Saskatoon Stonebridge. She was defeated by Darcy Warrington of the New Democratic Party.

=== Minister of Education (2016–2018) ===
Eyre was named to Premier Brad Wall's cabinet as Minister of Advanced Education in August 2016. When Eyre was given the post, she was challenged about a 2011 column in which she compared climate science to "witchcraft reasoning" and downplayed the threat of climate change. In response, Eyre claimed that she had meant the column to be humorous. In August 2017, Eyre became Minister of Education. In that position, Eyre came under scrutiny—and faced calls to resign—for a speech she gave in the Legislature suggesting that Indigenous history had become 'too infused' throughout the province's education curriculum. In the speech, Eyre shared an anecdote about her child's homework that was proven misleading. Eyre apologized for using her child's homework in the speech and affirmed support for treaty education. Backlash prompted the government to maintain Indigenous components of the curriculum in a planned review.

=== Minister of Energy and Resources (2018–2022) ===
Scott Moe succeeded Wall as premier in January 2018, and on February 2, Eyre was named Minister of Energy and Resources in Moe's cabinet. Eyre expressed skepticism about transitioning away from fossil fuels, and worked to expand the province's oil and gas industries, as well as its application of carbon capture storage and utilization.

=== Minister of Justice and Attorney-General (2022–2024) ===
On May 31, 2022, Moe shuffled his cabinet and named Eyre the first female Minister of Justice and Attorney General for Saskatchewan. Eyre stated that addressing "federal jurisdictional overreach", particularly as it pertained to resources and the environment, would be a top priority. In November 2022, Eyre introduced the Saskatchewan First Act, which was meant to assert provincial jurisdiction over natural resources and affirm their importance to the provincial economy. The economic analysis the government used to justify the act was criticized by experts. The Saskatchewan First Act itself drew widespread criticism, particularly from First Nations who pointed out that Treaties covering Saskatchewan lands predated the foundation of the province. In response to the introduction of the Act, Onion Lake Cree Nation launched a lawsuit against the province. Eyre has defended the legislation, stating that it is not a violation of Treaty rights and that provincial jurisdiction over resources is already a part of the Canadian constitution.

In October 2023, the Saskatchewan government passed new legislation called the Parents' Bill of Rights, a controversial bill enshrining in law policies that restrict sexual education and require parental consent for students under the age of 16 who wish to have their chosen pronouns and names affirmed at school. A Court of King's Bench justice granted an injunction against the initial policy, warning that it risked causing "irreparable harm" to vulnerable youth. After the injunction, the government opted to use the notwithstanding clause to enact the policy. The use of the clause, which came before the court process had completed, was widely criticized by legal experts. Eyre defended the government's use of the clause, and stated that the government was "willing to be judged" on the policy.

On November 28, 2023, Eyre nominated the first tribunal under the Saskatchewan First Act, meant to assess the economic costs of new federal Clean Electricity Regulations.

== Electoral record ==
2024 Saskatchewan general election: Saskatoon Stonebridge
Party	Candidate	Votes	%
New Democratic	Darcy Warrington	4,177	54.30
Saskatchewan	Bronwyn Eyre	3,336	43.36
Green	Cheryl Mazil	96	1.25
Progress	Jahangir J. Valiani	84	1.09
Total		7,693	100.00
Source: Elections Saskatchewan

2020 Saskatchewan general election: Saskatoon Stonebridge-Dakota
Party	Candidate	Votes	%
Saskatchewan	Bronwyn Eyre	7,584	67.17
New Democratic	Judicaël Moukoumi	3,083	27.31
Buffalo	Brett Gregg	334	2.96
Green	Lydia Martens	289	2.56
Total		11,290	100.00
Source: Elections Saskatchewan

2016 Saskatchewan general election: Saskatoon Stonebridge-Dakota
Party	Candidate	Votes	%
Saskatchewan	Bronwyn Eyre	6,584	69.96
New Democratic	Steve Jimbo	2,300	24.44
Liberal	Kevin Ber	377	4.00
Green	Michelle Wendzina	149	1.58
Total		9,410	100.00
Source: Saskatchewan Archives - Election Results by Electoral Division; Elections Saskatchewan

== Cabinet positions ==
Saskatchewan provincial government of Scott Moe
Cabinet posts (2)
Predecessor	Office	Successor
Gordon Wyant	Minister of Justice; May 31, 2022 – November 7, 2024	Tim McLeod
Nancy Heppner	Minister of Energy and Resources; February 2, 2018 – May 31, 2022	Jim Reiter
Saskatchewan provincial government of Brad Wall
Cabinet posts (2)
Predecessor	Office	Successor
Don Morgan	Minister of Education; August 30, 2017 – February 2, 2018	Gordon Wyant
Scott Moe	Minister of Advanced Education; August 23, 2016 – August 30, 2017	Kevin Doherty
