= Saskatoon Massey Place =

Former provincial electoral district in Saskatchewan, Canada

Coordinates: 52°08′53″N 106°42′23″W

Saskatchewan electoral district
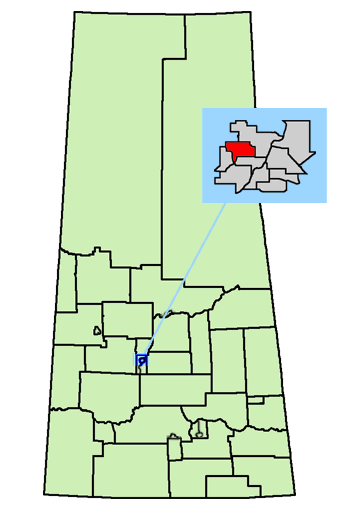

Defunct provincial electoral district
- Legislature: Legislative Assembly of Saskatchewan
- District created: 1995
- Last contested: 2011

Demographics
- Electors: 11,520
- Census division: Division 11
- Census subdivision: Saskatoon

Saskatoon Massey Place was a provincial electoral district for the Legislative Assembly of Saskatchewan, Canada. This district included the neighbourhoods of Dundonald, Caswell Hill, Massey Place, Hampton Village, Westview, and Hudson Bay Park. The area previously represented by this district is now represented by Saskatoon Westview and Saskatoon Centre.

Created by the Representation Act, 1994 (Saskatchewan) as "Saskatoon Mount Royal", it was renamed "Saskatoon Massey Place" through the Representation Act, 2002 (Saskatchewan). It was last contested in the 2011 provincial election.

== Members of the Legislative Assembly ==
Parliament	Years	Member	Party
Saskatoon Mount Royal
23rd	1995–1999	Eric Cline	New Democratic Party
24th	1999–2003	Eric Cline	New Democratic Party
Saskatoon Massey Place
25th	2003–2007	Eric Cline	New Democratic Party
26th	2007–2011	Cam Broten	New Democratic Party
27th	2011–2016	Cam Broten	New Democratic Party
District dissolved into Saskatoon Westview and Saskatoon Centre

== Election results ==
2011 Saskatchewan general election
Party	Candidate	Votes	%	±%
New Democratic	Cam Broten	3,812	53.85	-1.83
Saskatchewan	Ali Muzaffar	3,072	43.40	+7.77
Green	Diane West	195	2.75	+0.47
Total		7,079	100.00	

2007 Saskatchewan general election
Party	Candidate	Votes	%	±%
New Democratic	Cam Broten	4,109	55.68	-5.72
Saskatchewan	Dennis Neudorf	2,629	35.63	+14.06
Liberal	Ashraf Omar	473	6.41	-8.39
Green	Crystal Stadnyk	168	2.28	+1.35
Total		7,379	100.00	

2003 Saskatchewan general election
Party	Candidate	Votes	%	±%
New Democratic	Eric Cline	4,023	61.40	+3.45
Saskatchewan	Philipp Strenger	1,413	21.57	+0.51
Liberal	Myron Luczka	970	14.80	-4.73
Progressive Conservative	David Connor	85	1.30	-0.16
New Green	Ryan John Taylor	61	0.93	*
Total		6,552	100.00	

=== Saskatoon Mount Royal (1995–2003) ===
1999 Saskatchewan general election: Saskatoon Mount Royal
Party	Candidate	Votes	%	±%
New Democratic	Eric Cline	3,523	57.95	-5.21
Saskatchewan	Tyson Delorme	1,280	21.06	*
Liberal	Myron Luczka	1,187	19.53	-8.57
Progressive Conservative	Kirk Eggum	89	1.46	-7.28
Total		6,079	100.00	

1995 Saskatchewan general election: Saskatoon Mount Royal
Party	Candidate	Votes	%	±%
New Democratic	Eric Cline	3,894	63.16	*
Liberal	Maurice Velacott	1,732	28.10	*
Progressive Conservative	Pat Bundrock	539	8.74	*
Total		6,165	100.00	

== See also ==
- List of Saskatchewan provincial electoral districts
- List of Saskatchewan general elections
- Canadian provincial electoral districts
