= Biggar (electoral district) =

Former provincial electoral district in Saskatchewan, Canada

Coordinates: 52°10′N 107°40′W

Saskatchewan electoral district
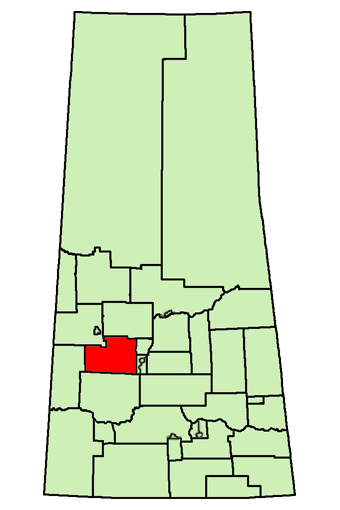

Defunct provincial electoral district
- Legislature: Legislative Assembly of Saskatchewan
- First contested: 2002
- Last contested: 2011

Demographics
- Population (2001): 16,500
- Electors: 10,758
- Census division(s): 12, 16

Biggar was a provincial electoral district for the Legislative Assembly of Saskatchewan, Canada. This former constituency, located in west central Saskatchewan, has an economy based primarily on mixed farming and alfalfa production, and oil production. Biggar is home to Prairie Malt Ltd. (the first malt plant in Saskatchewan) and is situated in the heart of Canada's prime barley-growing region. The Miller Western Palo Salt Mine is located 27 km west of Biggar. The 25 staff members produce sodium sulfate for shipping throughout Canada and the central United States. The major communities are Biggar (2,243), Wilkie (1,282) and Langham (1,145).

== History ==
=== Riding ===
The riding was originally created for the 1912 general election and was abolished following the 1991 general election. Woodrow Stanley Lloyd of the Co-operative Commonwealth Federation (later the CCF-NDP) represented the riding from 1944 until 1971 and as Premier of Saskatchewan from 1961 to 1964.

This riding was re-created by the Representation Act, 2002 (Saskatchewan). It is made up of areas of the Redberry Lake, Rosetown-Biggar, Battlefords-Cut Knife and Kindersley ridings. Both the riding of Redberry Lake and the riding of Rosetown-Biggar were new ridings created by the Representation Act, 1994 (Saskatchewan).

=== Member of the Legislative Assembly ===
Prior to the 1999 Saskatchewan general election, when the Saskatchewan Party made inroads, people in this area of the province generally elected NDP and PC MLAs.

#	MLA	Served	Party
1.	Randy Weekes	2003 – 2016	Saskatchewan Party

- Previous MLAs:
  - Redberry Lake: Randy Weekes, Saskatchewan Party
  - Rosetown-Biggar: Elwin Hermanson, Saskatchewan Party
  - Battlefords-Cut Knife: Wally Lorenz, Saskatchewan Party
  - Kindersley: Jason Dearborn, Saskatchewan Party

== Election results ==
Saskatchewan General Election 2003: Biggar
Party	Candidate	Votes	%	±%
Saskatchewan	Randy Weekes	3,899	53.57%	–
NDP	Lee W. Pearce	2,628	36.11%	–
Liberal	Steven Dribnenki	751	10.32%	–
Total		7,278	100.00%	

Saskatchewan General Election 2007: Biggar
Party	Candidate	Votes	%	±%
Saskatchewan	Randy Weekes	4,499	59.93%	+6.36
NDP	Ken Crush	2,311	30.78%	-5.33
Liberal	Nathan Jeffries	493	6.57%	-3.75
Green	Darryl Amey	204	2.72%	–
Total		7,507	100.00%	

2011 Saskatchewan general election
Party	Candidate	Votes	%	±%
Saskatchewan	Randy Weekes	4,493	68.15%	+8.22
New Democratic	Glenn Wright	1,695	25.71%	−5.07
Green	Darryl Amey	206	3.12%	+0.14
Progressive Conservative	James Yanchyshen	171	2.59%	–
Western Independence	Dana Arnason	28	0.43%	–
Total		6,593	100.00%	

== See also ==
- List of Saskatchewan provincial electoral districts
- List of Saskatchewan general elections
- Canadian provincial electoral districts
