= 15th Saskatchewan Legislature =

The 15th Legislative Assembly of Saskatchewan was elected in the Saskatchewan general election held in April 1964. The assembly sat from February 4, 1965, to September 8, 1967. The Liberal Party led by Ross Thatcher formed the government. The Co-operative Commonwealth Federation (CCF) led by Woodrow Lloyd formed the official opposition.

James Snedker served as speaker for the assembly.

== Members of the Assembly ==
The following members were elected to the assembly in 1964:

| Electoral district | Member | Party | First elected / previously elected | No.# of term(s) |
|---|---|---|---|---|
| Arm River | Martin Peder Pederson | Progressive Conservative | 1964 | 1st term |
| Athabasca | Allan Ray Guy | Liberal | 1960 | 2nd term |
| Bengough | Samuel Karnarvon Asbell | Liberal | 1964 | 1st term |
| Bengough | Alexander Mitchell (1966) | Liberal | 1966 | 1st term |
| Biggar | Woodrow Stanley Lloyd | Co-operative Commonwealth | 1944 | 6th term |
| Biggar | Woodrow Stanley Lloyd | New Democratic Party | 1944 | 6th term |
| Cannington | Thomas Milton Weatherald | Liberal | 1964 | 1st term |
| Canora | Kenneth Gordon Romuld | Liberal | 1964 | 1st term |
| Cumberland | Bill Berezowsky | Co-operative Commonwealth | 1952 | 4th term |
| Cumberland | Bill Berezowsky | New Democratic Party | 1952 | 4th term |
| Cut Knife | Isidore Charles Nollet | Co-operative Commonwealth | 1944 | 6th term |
| Cut Knife | Isidore Charles Nollet | New Democratic Party | 1944 | 6th term |
| Elrose | George Gordon Leith | Liberal | 1964 | 1st term |
| Gravelbourg | Lionel Philias Coderre | Liberal | 1956 | 3rd term |
| Hanley | Robert Alexander Walker | Co-operative Commonwealth | 1948 | 5th term |
| Hanley | Robert Alexander Walker | New Democratic Party | 1948 | 5th term |
| Humboldt | Mathieu Theodore Breker | Liberal | 1964 | 1st term |
| Kelsey | John Hewgill Brockelbank | Co-operative Commonwealth | 1938 | 7th term |
| Kelsey | John Hewgill Brockelbank | New Democratic Party | 1938 | 7th term |
| Kelvington | Bryan Harvey Bjarnason | Liberal | 1964 | 1st term |
| Kerrobert-Kindersley | William S. Howes | Liberal | 1964 | 1st term |
| Kinistino | Arthur Thibault | Co-operative Commonwealth | 1959 | 3rd term |
| Kinistino | Arthur Thibault | New Democratic Party | 1959 | 3rd term |
| Last Mountain | Donald Gilbert MacLennan | Liberal | 1964 | 1st term |
| Lumsden | Darrel Verner Heald | Liberal | 1964 | 1st term |
| Maple Creek | Alexander C. Cameron | Liberal | 1948 | 5th term |
| Meadow Lake | Henry Ethelbert Coupland | Liberal | 1964 | 1st term |
| Melfort-Tisdale | Clarence George Willis | Co-operative Commonwealth | 1952 | 4th term |
| Melfort-Tisdale | Clarence George Willis | New Democratic Party | 1952 | 4th term |
| Melville | James Wilfrid Gardiner | Liberal | 1956 | 3rd term |
| Milestone | Cyril Pius MacDonald | Liberal | 1964 | 1st term |
| Moose Jaw City | William Gwynne Davies | Co-operative Commonwealth | 1956 | 3rd term |
| Moose Jaw City | William Gwynne Davies | New Democratic Party | 1956 | 3rd term |
| Moose Jaw City | Gordon Taylor Snyder | Co-operative Commonwealth | 1960 | 2nd term |
| Moose Jaw City | Gordon Taylor Snyder | New Democratic Party | 1960 | 2nd term |
| Moosomin | Alexander Hamilton McDonald | Liberal | 1948 | 5th term |
| Moosomin | Ernest Franklin Gardner (1965) | Liberal | 1965 | 1st term |
| Morse | Wilbert Ross Thatcher | Liberal | 1960 | 2nd term |
| Nipawin | Frank Kenneth Radloff | Liberal | 1964 | 1st term |
| Notukeu-Willow Bunch | James Benjamin Hooker | Liberal | 1964 | 1st term |
| Pelly | Leonard Larson | Co-operative Commonwealth | 1964 | 1st term |
| Pelly | Leonard Larson | New Democratic Party | 1964 | 1st term |
| Prince Albert | David Gordon Steuart | Liberal | 1962 | 2nd term |
| Qu'Appelle-Wolseley | Douglas Thomas McFarlane | Liberal | 1956 | 3rd term |
| Redberry | Demitro (Dick) Wasyl Michayluk | Co-operative Commonwealth | 1960 | 2nd term |
| Redberry | Demitro (Dick) Wasyl Michayluk | New Democratic Party | 1960 | 2nd term |
| Regina East | Henry Harold Peter Baker | Co-operative Commonwealth | 1964 | 1st term |
| Regina East | Henry Harold Peter Baker | New Democratic Party | 1964 | 1st term |
| Regina East | Walter Smishek | Co-operative Commonwealth | 1964 | 1st term |
| Regina East | Walter Smishek | New Democratic Party | 1964 | 1st term |
| Regina North | Edward Charles Whelan | Co-operative Commonwealth | 1960 | 2nd term |
| Regina North | Edward Charles Whelan | New Democratic Party | 1960 | 2nd term |
| Regina South | Gordon Burton Grant | Liberal | 1964 | 1st term |
| Regina West | Allan Emrys Blakeney | Co-operative Commonwealth | 1960 | 2nd term |
| Regina West | Allan Emrys Blakeney | New Democratic Party | 1960 | 2nd term |
| Regina West | Marjorie Alexandra Cooper | Co-operative Commonwealth | 1952 | 4th term |
| Regina West | Marjorie Alexandra Cooper | New Democratic Party | 1952 | 4th term |
| Rosetown | George Fredrick Loken | Liberal | 1964 | 1st term |
| Rosthern | David Boldt | Liberal | 1960 | 2nd term |
| Saltcoats | James Snedker | Liberal | 1960 | 2nd term |
| Saskatoon City | Alexander Malcolm Nicholson | Co-operative Commonwealth | 1960 | 2nd term |
| Saskatoon City | Alexander Malcolm Nicholson | New Democratic Party | 1960 | 2nd term |
| Saskatoon City | John Edward Brockelbank | Co-operative Commonwealth | 1964 | 1st term |
| Saskatoon City | John Edward Brockelbank | New Democratic Party | 1964 | 1st term |
| Saskatoon City | Wesley Albert Robbins | Co-operative Commonwealth | 1964 | 1st term |
| Saskatoon City | Wesley Albert Robbins | New Democratic Party | 1964 | 1st term |
| Saskatoon City | Harry David Link | Co-operative Commonwealth | 1964 | 1st term |
| Saskatoon City | Harry David Link | New Democratic Party | 1964 | 1st term |
| Saskatoon City | Sally Maria Margharita Merchant | Liberal | 1964 | 1st term |
| Shaunavon | Fernand Larochelle | Liberal | 1964 | 1st term |
| Shellbrook | John Marcel Cuelenaere | Liberal | 1964 | 1st term |
| Souris-Estevan | Ian Hugh MacDougall | Liberal | 1960 | 2nd term |
| Swift Current | Everett Irvine Wood | Co-operative Commonwealth | 1956 | 3rd term |
| Swift Current | Everett Irvine Wood | New Democratic Party | 1956 | 3rd term |
| The Battlefords | Eiling Kramer | Co-operative Commonwealth | 1952 | 4th term |
| The Battlefords | Eiling Kramer | New Democratic Party | 1952 | 4th term |
| Touchwood | George Joseph Trapp | Liberal | 1964 | 1st term |
| Turtleford | Bob Wooff | Co-operative Commonwealth | 1944, 1952, 1960, 1964 | 4th term* |
| Turtleford | Bob Wooff | New Democratic Party | 1944, 1952, 1960, 1964 | 4th term* |
| Wadena | Frederick Arthur Dewhurst | Co-operative Commonwealth | 1945 | 6th term |
| Wadena | Frederick Arthur Dewhurst | New Democratic Party | 1945 | 6th term |
| Watrous | Hans Adolf Broten | Co-operative Commonwealth | 1960 | 2nd term |
| Watrous | Hans Adolf Broten | New Democratic Party | 1960 | 2nd term |
| Weyburn | James Auburn Pepper | Co-operative Commonwealth | 1964 | 1st term |
| Weyburn | James Auburn Pepper | New Democratic Party | 1964 | 1st term |
| Wilkie | Joseph Clifford McIsaac | Liberal | 1964 | 1st term |
| Yorkton | Bernard David Gallagher | Liberal | 1960 | 2nd term |

== Party Standings ==
| Affiliation | Members |
|---|---|
| Liberal | 32 |
| Co-operative Commonwealth | 26 |
| Progressive Conservative | 1 |
| Total | 59 |
| Government Majority | 5 |

== By-elections ==
By-elections were held to replace members for various reasons:

| Electoral district | Member elected | Party | Election date | Reason |
|---|---|---|---|---|
| Hanley | Robert Alexander Walker | Co-operative Commonwealth | December 16, 1964 | RA Walker resigned after winning by one vote following a judicial recount |
| Moosomin | Ernest Franklin Gardner | Liberal | June 30, 1965 | AH McDonald named to Canadian senate |
| Bengough | Alexander Mitchell | Liberal | February 16, 1966 | SK Asbell died in 1965 |
