= 16th Saskatchewan Legislature =

Provincial legislative assembly in Canada

The 16th Legislative Assembly of Saskatchewan was elected in the Saskatchewan general election held in October 1967. The assembly sat from February 15, 1968, to May 25, 1971. The Liberal Party led by Ross Thatcher formed the government. The New Democratic Party (NDP) led by Woodrow Lloyd formed the official opposition. Allan Blakeney succeeded Lloyd as party leader in 1970.

James Snedker served as speaker for the assembly.

== Members of the Assembly ==
The following members were elected to the assembly in 1967:

Electoral district	Member	Party	First elected / previously elected	No.# of term(s)
Arm River	Wilbert McIvor	Liberal	1967	1st term
Athabasca	Allan Ray Guy	Liberal	1960	3rd term
Bengough	Alexander Mitchell	Liberal	1966	2nd term
Biggar	Woodrow Stanley Lloyd	New Democratic Party	1944	7th term
Cannington	Thomas Milton Weatherald	Liberal	1964	2nd term
Canora	Al Matsalla	New Democratic Party	1967	1st term
Cut Knife	Miro Kwasnica	New Democratic Party	1967	1st term
Elrose	George Gordon Leith	Liberal	1964	2nd term
Gravelbourg	Lionel Philias Coderre	Liberal	1956	4th term
Hanley	Robert Andrew Heggie	Liberal	1967	1st term
Humboldt	Mathieu Theodore Breker	Liberal	1964	2nd term
Kelsey	John Rissler Messer	New Democratic Party	1967	1st term
Kelvington	Bryan Harvey Bjarnason	Liberal	1964	2nd term
Kelvington	Neil Erland Byers (1969)	New Democratic Party	1969	1st term
Kerrobert-Kindersley	William S. Howes	Liberal	1964	2nd term
Kinistino	Arthur Thibault	New Democratic Party	1959	4th term
Last Mountain	Donald Gilbert MacLennan	Liberal	1964	2nd term
Lumsden	Darrel Verner Heald	Liberal	1964	2nd term
Maple Creek	Alexander C. Cameron	Liberal	1948	6th term
Meadow Lake	Henry Ethelbert Coupland	Liberal	1964	2nd term
Melfort-Tisdale	Clarence George Willis	New Democratic Party	1952	5th term
Melville	John Russell Kowalchuk	New Democratic Party	1967	1st term
Milestone	Cyril Pius MacDonald	Liberal	1964	2nd term
Moose Jaw North	Gordon Taylor Snyder	New Democratic Party	1960	3rd term
Moose Jaw South	William Gwynne Davies	New Democratic Party	1956	4th term
Moosomin	Ernest Franklin Gardner	Liberal	1965	2nd term
Morse	Wilbert Ross Thatcher	Liberal	1960	3rd term
Nipawin	Frank Kenneth Radloff	Liberal	1964	2nd term
Notukeu-Willow Bunch	James Benjamin Hooker	Liberal	1964	2nd term
Pelly	Jim Barrie	Liberal	1956, 1967	3rd term*
Prince Albert East-Cumberland	Bill Berezowsky	New Democratic Party	1952	5th term
Prince Albert West	David Gordon Steuart	Liberal	1962	3rd term
Qu'Appelle-Wolseley	Douglas Thomas McFarlane	Liberal	1956	4th term
Redberry	Demitro (Dick) Wasyl Michayluk	New Democratic Party	1960	3rd term
Regina Centre	Allan Emrys Blakeney	New Democratic Party	1960	3rd term
Regina North East	Walter Smishek	New Democratic Party	1964	2nd term
Regina North West	Edward Charles Whelan	New Democratic Party	1960	3rd term
Regina South	Gordon Burton Grant	Liberal	1964	2nd term
Regina South East	Henry Harold Peter Baker	New Democratic Party	1964	2nd term
Regina South West	Donald Mighton McPherson	Liberal	1967	1st term
Rosetown	George Fredrick Loken	Liberal	1964	2nd term
Rosthern	David Boldt	Liberal	1960	3rd term
Saltcoats	James Snedker	Liberal	1960	3rd term
Saskatoon City Park-University	Joseph Jeffrey Charlebois	Liberal	1967	1st term
Saskatoon Mayfair	John Edward Brockelbank	New Democratic Party	1964	2nd term
Saskatoon Nutana Centre	Clarence Leslie Baldwin Estey	Liberal	1967	1st term
Saskatoon Nutana South	William Austin Forsyth	Liberal	1967	1st term
Saskatoon Riversdale	Roy John Romanow	New Democratic Party	1967	1st term
Shaunavon	Fernand Larochelle	Liberal	1964	2nd term
Shellbrook	George Reginald Anderson Bowerman	New Democratic Party	1967	1st term
Souris-Estevan	Ian Hugh MacDougall	Liberal	1960	3rd term
Swift Current	Everett Irvine Wood	New Democratic Party	1956	4th term
The Battlefords	Eiling Kramer	New Democratic Party	1952	5th term
Touchwood	Frank Meakes	New Democratic Party	1956, 1967	3rd term*
Turtleford	Bob Wooff	New Democratic Party	1944, 1952, 1960, 1964	5th term*
Wadena	Frederick Arthur Dewhurst	New Democratic Party	1945	7th term
Watrous	Percy Arnold Schmeiser	Liberal	1967	1st term
Weyburn	James Auburn Pepper	New Democratic Party	1964	2nd term
Wilkie	Joseph Clifford McIsaac	Liberal	1964	2nd term
Yorkton	Bernard David Gallagher	Liberal	1960	3rd term

== Party Standings ==
Affiliation	Members
Liberal	35
New Democratic Party (Note: The Saskatchewan CCF officially became the Saskatchewan NDP on November 25, 1967)	24
Total	59
Government Majority	9

== By-elections ==
By-elections were held to replace members for various reasons:

Electoral district	Member elected	Party	Election date	Reason
Kelvington	Neil Erland Byers	New Democratic Party	June 25, 1969	Results of the 1967 election were declared invalid
