= 14th Saskatchewan Legislature =

The 14th Legislative Assembly of Saskatchewan was elected in the Saskatchewan general election held in June 1960. The assembly sat from February 9, 1961, to March 18, 1964. The Co-operative Commonwealth Federation (CCF) led by Tommy Douglas formed the government. Woodrow Lloyd became Premier and CCF party leader in November 1961 after Douglas became leader of the federal New Democratic Party. The Liberal Party led by Ross Thatcher formed the official opposition.

Everett Irvine Wood served as speaker for the assembly until 1962. Frederick Arthur Dewhurst succeeded Wood as speaker.

== Members of the Assembly ==
The following members were elected to the assembly in 1960:

Electoral district	Member	Party	First elected / previously elected	No.# of term(s)
Arm River	Gustaf Herman Danielson	Liberal	1934	7th term
Athabasca	Allan Ray Guy	Liberal	1960	1st term
Bengough	Hjalmar Reinhold Dahlman	Co-operative Commonwealth	1960	1st term
Biggar	Woodrow Stanley Lloyd	Co-operative Commonwealth	1944	5th term
Cannington	Rosscoe Arnold McCarthy	Liberal	1949	4th term
Canora	Alex Gordon Kuziak	Co-operative Commonwealth	1948	4th term
Cumberland	Bill Berezowsky	Co-operative Commonwealth	1952	3rd term
Cut Knife	Isidore Charles Nollet	Co-operative Commonwealth	1944	5th term
Elrose	Olaf Alexander Turnbull	Co-operative Commonwealth	1960	1st term
Gravelbourg	Lionel Philias Coderre	Liberal	1956	2nd term
Hanley	Robert Alexander Walker	Co-operative Commonwealth	1948	4th term
Humboldt	Mary John Batten	Liberal	1956	2nd term
Kelsey	John Hewgill Brockelbank	Co-operative Commonwealth	1938	6th term
Kelvington	Clifford Benjamin Peterson	Co-operative Commonwealth	1960	1st term
Kerrobert-Kindersley	Eldon Arthur Johnson	Co-operative Commonwealth	1956	2nd term
Kinistino	Arthur Thibault	Co-operative Commonwealth	1959	2nd term
Last Mountain	Russell Brown	Co-operative Commonwealth	1952	3rd term
Lumsden	Clifford Honey Thurston	Co-operative Commonwealth	1956	2nd term
Maple Creek	Alexander C. Cameron	Liberal	1948	4th term
Meadow Lake	Martin Semchuk	Co-operative Commonwealth	1960	1st term
Melfort-Tisdale	Clarence George Willis	Co-operative Commonwealth	1952	3rd term
Melville	James Wilfrid Gardiner	Liberal	1956	2nd term
Milestone	Jacob Walter Erb	Co-operative Commonwealth	1948	4th term
Milestone	Jacob Walter Erb	Liberal	1948	4th term
Moose Jaw City	William Gwynne Davies	Co-operative Commonwealth	1956	2nd term
Moose Jaw City	Gordon Taylor Snyder	Co-operative Commonwealth	1960	1st term
Moosomin	Alexander Hamilton McDonald	Liberal	1948	4th term
Morse	Wilbert Ross Thatcher	Liberal	1960	1st term
Nipawin	Robert Irvin Perkins	Co-operative Commonwealth	1960	1st term
Notukeu-Willow Bunch	Karl Frank Klein	Liberal	1956	2nd term
Pelly	Jim Barrie	Liberal	1956	2nd term
Prince Albert	Lachlan Fraser McIntosh	Co-operative Commonwealth	1944	5th term
Prince Albert	David Gordon Steuart (1962)	Liberal	1962	1st term
Qu'Appelle-Wolseley	Douglas Thomas McFarlane	Liberal	1956	2nd term
Redberry	Demitro (Dick) Wasyl Michayluk	Co-operative Commonwealth	1960	1st term
Regina City	Charles Cromwell Williams	Co-operative Commonwealth	1944	5th term
Regina City	Allan Emrys Blakeney	Co-operative Commonwealth	1960	1st term
Regina City	Marjorie Alexandra Cooper	Co-operative Commonwealth	1952	3rd term
Regina City	Edward Charles Whelan	Co-operative Commonwealth	1960	1st term
Rosetown	Allan Leonard Frederick Stevens	Co-operative Commonwealth	1960	1st term
Rosthern	David Boldt	Liberal	1960	1st term
Saltcoats	James Snedker	Liberal	1960	1st term
Saskatoon City	Arthur Thomas Stone	Co-operative Commonwealth	1944	5th term
Saskatoon City	Alexander Malcolm Nicholson	Co-operative Commonwealth	1960	1st term
Saskatoon City	Gladys Grace Mae Strum	Co-operative Commonwealth	1960	1st term
Shaunavon	Arthur Kluzak	Co-operative Commonwealth	1960	1st term
Shellbrook	John Thiessen	Co-operative Commonwealth	1956	2nd term
Souris-Estevan	Ian Hugh MacDougall	Liberal	1960	1st term
Swift Current	Everett Irvine Wood	Co-operative Commonwealth	1956	2nd term
The Battlefords	Eiling Kramer	Co-operative Commonwealth	1952	3rd term
Touchwood	Frank Meakes	Co-operative Commonwealth	1956	2nd term
Turtleford (Note: Election declared void)	Bob Wooff	Co-operative Commonwealth	1944, 1952, 1960	3rd term*
Turtleford	Frank Foley (1961)	Liberal	1956, 1961	2nd term*
Wadena	Frederick Arthur Dewhurst	Co-operative Commonwealth	1945	5th term
Watrous	Hans Adolf Broten	Co-operative Commonwealth	1960	1st term
Weyburn	Thomas Clement Douglas	Co-operative Commonwealth	1944	5th term
Weyburn	Junior Herbert Staveley (1961)	Liberal	1961	1st term
Wilkie	John Whitmore Horsman	Liberal	1948	4th term
Yorkton	Bernard David Gallagher	Liberal	1960	1st term

== Party Standings ==
Affiliation	Members
Co-operative Commonwealth	37
Liberal	17
Total	54 (Note: One election declared void)
Government Majority	20

== By-elections ==
By-elections were held to replace members for various reasons:

Electoral district	Member elected	Party	Election date	Reason
Turtleford	Frank Foley	Liberal	February 22, 1961	Election declared void after an appeal
Weyburn	Junior Herbert Staveley	Liberal	December 13, 1961	TC Douglas became leader of federal NDP
Prince Albert	David Gordon Steuart	Liberal	November 14, 1962	LF McIntosh died March 17, 1962
