= 1964 Saskatchewan general election =

Canadian provincial election

- April 22, 1964

59 seats in the Legislative Assembly of Saskatchewan 30 seats needed for a majority
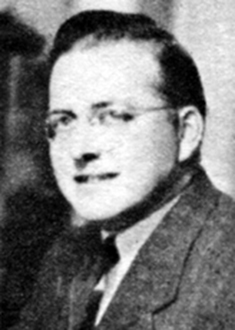

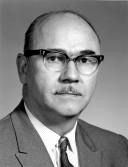
	First party	Second party	Third party
			PC
Leader	Ross Thatcher	Woodrow Lloyd	Martin Pederson
Party	Liberal	Co-operative Commonwealth	Progressive Conservative
Leader since	September 24, 1959	November 3, 1961	October 28, 1958
Leader's seat	Morse	Biggar	Arm River
Last election	17	37	0
Seats won	32	26	1
Seat change	▲15	▼11	▲1
Popular vote	269,402	268,742	126,028
Percentage	40.40%	40.30%	18.90%
Swing	▲7.3pp	▼0.46pp	▲4.95pp
Premier before election
Woodrow Lloyd
Co-operative Commonwealth
Premier after election
Ross Thatcher
Liberal

The 1964 Saskatchewan general election was held on April 22, 1964, to elect members of the 15th Saskatchewan Legislature.

The Co-operative Commonwealth Federation (CCF) government of Premier Woodrow Lloyd was defeated by the Liberal Party, led by Ross Thatcher. The CCF had governed Saskatchewan since the 1944 election under the leadership (until December 1961) of Tommy Douglas.

By 1964 the provincial Social Credit Party had collapsed, nominating only two candidates. In another morale hit, the federal Social Credit Party endorsed the Liberals during the election. While the CCF held on to nearly all of their vote from the previous election and only trailed the Liberals by 0.1%, most of the shift in Social Credit support went to the Liberals and proved decisive in helping to push Thatcher to a majority government.

The Progressive Conservative Party also picked up some support at the expense of Social Credit but won only one seat in the legislature, that of leader Martin Pederson.

== Election campaign ==
Douglas' government was the first social democratic government in North America, and had introduced the medicare system in Canada. This led to a 23-day strike by the province's physicians. Universal public health care, however, was not an issue in the campaign. In fact, following its successful introduction, the opposition Liberals were for expanding Medicare even more. The only provincial party to advocate eliminating Medicare was the small Social Credit Party.

The Social Credit party nominated only two candidates in the election, and they were hurt by statements by the federal Social Credit party leader, Robert N. Thompson, supporting the Saskatchewan Liberals. The Socreds' leader, Martin Kelln, chose not to spend much time on the campaign, in part because of the recent death of his mother.

The Progressive Conservatives returned to the Legislative Assembly for the first time since 1934. They won only one seat despite winning almost 19% of the popular vote. The Tories promised to keep Medicare in place, but opposed the Liberals' plans to expand it. They argued that the Liberals were too radical, and that the CCF government was not doing enough to develop the province's natural resources.

The Liberals were able to capitalize on the collapse of Social Credit and were more effective than the Tories in drawing the "anti-socialist" (anti-CCF) vote. Yet the campaign was not marked by any major issues.

There was, however, considerable animosity between the Liberals and the CCF. The Liberals employed what were called "Madison Avenue campaign tactics" and spent a lot of money on campaign advertising, especially television advertising. They tried to characterize the election as being a choice between socialism and private enterprise-oriented reform. The Saskatchewan Liberals ran well to the right of the federal Liberals and claimed that the CCF government was stagnating.

A warning sign came in the 1962 federal election. The federal CCF had merged with the Canadian Labour Congress to form the New Democratic Party, though the Saskatchewan branch kept the CCF name. Douglas resigned as premier and party leader to become the NDP's first leader, and was succeeded by then-Treasurer Woodrow Lloyd, a former teacher. However, the NDP was completely shut out in Saskatchewan, and Douglas lost by almost 10,000 votes in his bid for a Regina-area riding.

The CCF campaigned heavily on its 20-year record in government. Lloyd attacked the Liberal campaign, stating that they had resorted to "hucksterism, the kind of sales attempts that one usually associates with useless pills, second hand cars and body deodorants."

Lloyd faced several challenges: taxes in Saskatchewan were among the highest in Canada; spending on health care, welfare and education were high; and he lacked the popular support Douglas had enjoyed. However, Saskatchewan had the second highest per capita income in Canada and the lowest unemployment rate in Canada.

== Electoral system ==
In this election, Saskatchewan used a mixture of single-member districts, electing through First past the post, and multiple-member districts, electing through Plurality block voting.

Before the next election, Saskatchewan switched to consistent single-member districts.

== Results ==
Party	Party leader	# of candidates	Seats				Popular vote		
Party	Party leader	# of candidates	1960	Dissol.	Elected	% Change	#	%	% Change
Liberal	Ross Thatcher	59	17	19	32	+68.4%	269,402	40.40%	+7.73%
Co-operative Commonwealth	Woodrow Lloyd	59	37	35	25/26^{1}	-25.7%	268,742	40.30%	-0.46%
Progressive Conservative	Martin Pederson	42	–	–	1	+1000%	126,028	18.90%	+4.95%
Social Credit	Martin Kelln	2	–	–	–	–	2,621	0.39%	-11.96%
Communist		1	–	–	–	–	68	0.01%	-0.05%
Total		163	54	54	59^{1}	+9.3%	666,861	100%	
Source: Elections Saskatchewan

Note: ^{1} One seat declared void.

=== Percentages ===
Popular vote
Liberal	40.40%
CCF	40.30%
PC	18.90%
Others	0.40%

Seats summary
Liberal	54.24%
CCF	44.07%
PC	1.69%

=== Ranking ===
Party	Seats	Second	Third
Liberal	32	26	1
Co-operative Commonwealth	26	31	2
Progressive Conservative	1	2	39
Other parties	0	0	3

== Riding results ==
Names in bold represent cabinet ministers and the Speaker. Party leaders are italicized. The symbol " ** " indicates MLAs who are not running again.

=== Northwestern Saskatchewan ===
Electoral district	Candidates				Incumbent
Electoral district	Liberal	CCF	PC	Other	Incumbent
Athabasca	Allan Ray Guy; 1,076	John M. Stonehocker; 684	Harry J. Houghton; 909		Allan Ray Guy
Cut Knife-Lloydminster	Raymond H. Rooney; 1,821	Isidore Charles Nollet; 2,927	Gordon Goodfellow; 1,617		Isidore Charles Nollet
Meadow Lake	Henry Coupland; 3,149	Martin Semchuk; 2,113	Frederick L. Dunbar; 1,014		Martin Semchuk
Redberry	Bernard L. Korchinski; 1,993	Dick Michayluk; 2,200	Walter John Dolynny; 1,238		Demitro Wasyl Michayluk
Rosthern	David Boldt; 2,873	George Guenther; 1,949		Isaak Elias (Social Credit) 1,239	David Boldt
Shellbrook	John Cuelenaere; 2,427	John Thiessen; 2,259	Norval Horner; 1,701		John Thiessen
The Battlefords	Herbert O.M. Sparrow; 4,242	Eiling Kramer; 4,645			Eiling Kramer
Turtleford	Frank Foley; 2,123	Bob Wooff; 2,221	William Elmer Armstrong; 1,502		Franklin Edward Foley

=== Northeastern Saskatchewan ===
Electoral district	Candidates				Incumbent
Electoral district	Liberal	CCF	PC	Other	Incumbent
Cumberland	Eldon McLachlan; 1,630	Bill Berezowsky; 2,135	Emanuel Sonnenschein; 963		Bill Berezowsky
Humboldt	Mathieu Breker; 4,226	Sylvester E. Wiegers; 3,030	Frank J. Martin; 1,244		Mary Batten**
Kelsey	William John McHugh; 2269	John Hewgill Brockelbank; 5283	Carsten Johnson; 703		John Hewgill Brockelbank
Kelvington	Bryan Bjarnason; 2,888	Neil Byers; 2,398	Joseph M. Ratch; 1,341		Clifford Benjamin Peterson**
Kinistino	Michael A. Hnidy; 3,125	Arthur Thibault; 3,334			Arthur Thibault
Melfort-Tisdale	William Ernest Hurd; 3,056	Clarence George Willis; 3,471	Kenneth Aseltine; 2,094		Clarence George Willis
Nipawin	Frank Radloff; 2,652	Bob Perkins; 2,440	John A. Whittome; 1,942		Robert Irvin Perkins
Prince Albert	Davey Steuart; 5,024	Joseph E. Leon Lamontagne; 4,946	Richard E. Spencer; 3,828		David Gordon Steuart

=== West Central Saskatchewan ===
Electoral district	Candidates				Incumbent
Electoral district	Liberal	CCF	PC	Other	Incumbent
Arm River	Gustaf Herman Danielson; 2,020	Emanuel Lang; 1,550	Martin Pederson; 2,326		Gustaf Herman Danielson
Biggar	Benson McLeod Blacklock; 1,992	**Woodrow S. Lloyd**; 2,875	George Loucks; 1,120		Woodrow Lloyd
Hanley	~~Herbert C. "Charlie" Pinder~~; ~~3,938~~	~~Robert Alexander Walker~~; ~~3,940~~	~~Hans Taal~~; ~~2,602~~		Robert Alexander Walker
Kerrobert-Kindersley	William S. Howes; 3,799	Eldon Johnson; 2,937			Eldon Arthur Johnson
Rosetown	George Loken; 2,573	Allan Stevens; 2,367	Les P. Hickson; 1,396		Allan Leonard Frederick Stevens
Watrous	Neil McArthur; 2,602	Hans Broten; 2,725			Hans Broten
Wilkie	Joseph "Cliff" McIsaac; 3,593	W. Ray Grant; 2,162	Donald Wallace; 1,649		John Whitmore Horsman**

==== Re-run of voided election ====
December 16, 1964, by-election: Hanley
Party	Candidate	Votes	%	±%
CCF	Robert Walker	4,608	45.14%	+7.55
Liberal	Herb Pinder	3,864	37.86%	+0.28
Prog. Conservative	W. Hugh Arscott	1,735	17.00%	-7.83
Total		10,207	100.00%	

=== East Central Saskatchewan ===
Electoral district	Candidates				Incumbent
Electoral district	Liberal	CCF	PC	Other	Incumbent
Canora	Ken Romuld; 3,391	Alex Kuziak; 3,348			Alex Gordon Kuziak
Last Mountain	Donald MacLennan; 2,857	Russell Brown; 2,799		Martin Kelln (Social Credit) 1,382	Russell Brown
Melville	James W. Gardiner; 3,485	William Wiwchar; 3,229	Douglas A. Ellis; 1,627		James Wilfrid Gardiner
Pelly	Jim Barrie; 2,669	Leo Larson; 2,705	Bohdan E. Lozinsky; 1,212		Jim Barrie
Saltcoats	**James Snedker**; 3,260	Baldur M. Olson; 2,275	David Arthur Keyes; 1,537		James Snedker
Touchwood	George Trapp; 2,692	Frank Meakes; 2,566	Alice M.L. Turner; 1,320		Frank Meakes
Wadena	Elizabeth Mary Paulson; 2,580	**Fred Dewhurst**; 3,295	H.D. McPhail; 1,405		Frederick Arthur Dewhurst
Yorkton	Barry Gallagher; 4,337	Karl Rokeby Bartelt; 3,494	Lawrence L. Ball; 1,841		Bernard David Gallagher

=== Southwest Saskatchewan ===
Electoral district	Candidates				Incumbent
Electoral district	Liberal	CCF	PC	Other	Incumbent
Elrose	George Leith; 3,317	Alex Turnbull; 3,263			Olaf Alexander Turnbull
Gravelbourg	Lionel Coderre; 2,999	Roland Leblanc; 2,448			Lionel Philas Coderre
Maple Creek	Alexander Cameron; 2,977	William Percy Rolick; 2,424	Marlyn K. Clary; 1,389		Alexander C. Cameron
Morse	**Ross Thatcher**; 3,188	Paul W. Beach; 2,952			Ross Thatcher
Notukeu-Willow Bunch	Jim Hooker; 2,660	Hasket Merle Sproule; 2,193	Boyd M. Anderson; 946		Karl Frank Klein**
Shaunavon	Fernand Larochelle; 2,955	Art Kluzak; 2,545	Clifford Boyd Clark; 1,225		Arthur Kluzak
Swift Current	T. Lawrence Salloum; 4,647	Everett Irvine Wood; 5,238			Everett Irvine Wood

=== Southeast Saskatchewan ===
Electoral district	Candidates				Incumbent
Electoral district	Liberal	CCF	PC	Other	Incumbent
Bengough	Sam Asbell; 2,613	Hjalmar Dahlman; 2,311	Roy Bailey; 1,192		Hjalmar Reinhold Dahlman
Cannington	Tom Weatherald; 3,852	Henry George Doty; 2,489	Glenn Brimner; 1,917		Rosscoe Arnold McCarthy**
Lumsden	Darrel Heald; 2,469	Cliff Thurston; 2,068	William Clyde Tufts; 1,614		Clifford Honey Thurston
Milestone	Cyril MacDonald; 2,568	James M. Hubbs; 1,972	Leonard Frederick Westrum; 1,023		Jacob Walter Erb**
Moosomin	Alexander Hamilton McDonald; 4,523	William Francis Goodwin; 3,102			Alex "Hammy" McDonald
Qu'Appelle-Wolseley	Doug McFarlane; 3,525	John Stephen Leier; 2,188	Victor Edward Horsman; 2,164		Douglas Thomas McFarlane
Souris-Estevan	Ian MacDougall; 6,220	Ivar Johann Kristianson; 4,040			Ian Hugh MacDougall
Weyburn	Junior Staveley; 4,347	Jim Pepper; 4,453	Jean Benson; 1,234		Junior Herbert Staveley

June 30, 1965, by-election: Moosomin
Party	Candidate	Votes	%	±%
Liberal	Frank Gardner	3,033	36.72%	-22.60
CCF	William Francis Goodwin	2,821	34.14%	-6.54
Prog. Conservative	Andrew Emerson Bruce	2,407	29.14%	-
Total		8,261	100.00%	

February 16, 1966, by-election: Bengough
Party	Candidate	Votes	%	±%
Liberal	Alex Mitchell	2,423	42.74%	+0.02
CCF	Hjalmar Dahlman	2,285	40.31%	+2.52
Prog. Conservative	George W. Spicer	961	16.95%	-2.54
Total		5,669	100.00%	

=== Moose Jaw and Saskatoon ===
Saskatchewan general election, 1964: Moose Jaw City (2 members elected)
Party	Candidate	Votes	%	±%
CCF	William Davies (incumbent)	7,749	24.55%	-
CCF	Gordon Snyder (incumbent)	7,550	23.92%	-
Prog. Conservative	Daniel J. Patterson	7,115	22.54%	-
Liberal	E. A. Astell	5,455	17.28%	-
Prog. Conservative	Gordon A. Hume	3,697	11.71%	-
Total		31,566	100.00%	

Saskatchewan general election, 1964: Saskatoon City (5 members elected)
Party	Candidate	Votes	%	±%
CCF	Alex M. Nicholson (incumbent)	16,701	7.83%	-
CCF	Edward Brockelbank (elected)	16,559	7.76%	-
CCF	Wes Robbins (elected)	16,126	7.56%	-
Liberal	Sally Merchant (elected)	16,068	7.53%	-
CCF	Harry D. Link (elected)	16,041	7.52%	-
Liberal	Clarence Estey	15,761	7.39%	-
CCF	Gladys Strum (incumbent)	15,741	7.38%	-
Liberal	Keith McLean Crocker	15,661	7.34%	-
Liberal	Joseph J. Charlebois	15,542	7.28%	-
Liberal	Victor C. Hession	14,770	6.92%	-
Prog. Conservative	Lewis Brand	11,401	5.34%	-
Prog. Conservative	W. Hugh Arscott	11,344	5.32%	-
Prog. Conservative	Ray Hnatyshyn	10,874	5.09%	-
Prog. Conservative	Henry Clay Rees	10,543	4.94%	-
Prog. Conservative	Irving Goldenberg	10,240	4.80%	-
Total		213,372	100.00%	

=== Regina ===
Electoral district	Candidates				Incumbent
Electoral district	Liberal	CCF	PC	Other	Incumbent
Regina East	Paul Dojack; 8,208 Jacob W. Erb; 8,060	Henry Baker; 8,953 Walt Smishek; 8,395	Dick Shelton; 2,356 George J. Tkach; 2,343		New District
Regina North	Ron Atchison; 3,867	Ed Whelan; 4,722		Norman Brudy (Communist) 68	New District
Regina South	Gordon Grant; 7,788	George R. Bothwell; 3,440			New District
Regina West	Alex Cochrane; 7,770 Betty Sear; 6,981	Allan Blakeney; 9,076 Marjorie Cooper; 8,413	Donald K. MacPherson; 4,495		New District

== See also ==
- List of political parties in Saskatchewan
- List of Saskatchewan provincial electoral districts
