= 1967 Saskatchewan general election =

Canadian provincial election

- October 11, 1967

59 seats in the Legislative Assembly of Saskatchewan 30 seats needed for a majority
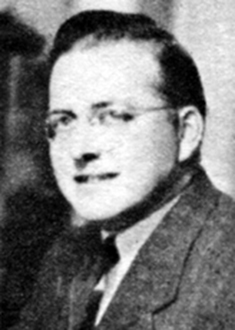

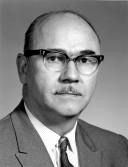
| | First party | Second party | Third party |
|---|---|---|---|
| | | | PC |
| Leader | Ross Thatcher | Woodrow Lloyd | Martin Pederson |
| Party | Liberal | New Democratic | Progressive Conservative |
| Leader since | September 24, 1959 | November 3, 1961 | October 28, 1958 |
| Leader's seat | Morse | Biggar | Arm River (lost re-election) |
| Last election | 32 | 26 | 1 |
| Seats won | 35 | 24 | 0 |
| Seat change | ▲3 | ▼2 | ▼1 |
| Popular vote | 193,871 | 188,653 | 41,583 |
| Percentage | 45.57% | 44.35% | 9.78% |
| Swing | ▲5.17pp | ▲4.05pp | ▼9.12pp |
Premier before election
Ross Thatcher
Liberal
Premier after election
Ross Thatcher
Liberal

The 1967 Saskatchewan general election was held on October 11, 1967, to elect members of the Legislative Assembly of Saskatchewan, in the province of Saskatchewan, Canada.

The Liberal Party of Saskatchewan, led by Premier Ross Thatcher, was re-elected with a slightly larger majority in the legislature and a larger share of the popular vote.

The Co-operative Commonwealth Federation had changed its name to the New Democratic Party to match the change that had already been made at the federal level. Still led by former Premier Woodrow Lloyd, the NDP also won an increased share of the popular vote but lost one of the seats that the CCF had won in the previous election.

The Liberal and NDP gains in the popular vote came at the expense of the Progressive Conservative Party of Saskatchewan of Martin Pederson, which lost about half of its votes. Pederson finished third in the constituency he had won three years earlier, and no other PC members were elected. However, a PC candidate finished second in Athabasca.

It was the first election in which the cities of Saskatoon and Moose Jaw were divided into two or more single-member constituencies instead of having a single city-wide multiple-member district for each city. Previously since 1921 those two cities (and Regina from 1921 to 1964) had elected their MLAs through Plurality block voting, but starting in this election, MLAs in Saskatoon and Moose Jaw were elected through First past the post.

It was the last election, as of 2020, in which the leaders of both the government and the opposition in Saskatchewan represented rural constituencies. It was also the last election contested by the Social Credit Party, which nominated six candidates. To date this is the last election in which the Saskatchewan Liberal Party won a majority of seats.

== Results ==
| Party | Party leader | Candidates | Seats | | | | Popular vote | |
| Party | Party leader | Candidates | 1964 | Elected | % Change | # | % | % Change |
|---|---|---|---|---|---|---|---|---|
| Liberal | Ross Thatcher | 59 | 32 | 35 | +9.4% | 193,871 | 45.57% | +5.17% |
| New Democratic | Woodrow Lloyd | 59 | 25 | 24 | -4.0% | 188,653 | 44.35% | +4.05% |
| Progressive Conservative | Martin Pederson | 41 | 1 | – | -100% | 41,583 | 9.78% | -9.12% |
| Social Credit | | 6 | – | – | – | 1,296 | 0.30% | -0.09% |
| Total | | 165 | 58 | 59 | +1.7% | 425,403 | 100% | |
Source: Elections Saskatchewan

=== Percentages ===
Popular vote
| Liberal | 45.57% |
| New Democratic | 44.35% |
| PC | 9.78% |
| Social Credit | 0.30% |

Seats summary
| Liberal | 59.32% |
| New Democratic | 40.68% |

=== Ranking ===
| Party | Seats | Second | Third | Fourth |
|---|---|---|---|---|
| Liberal | 35 | 24 | 0 | 0 |
| New Democratic | 24 | 34 | 1 | 0 |
| Progressive Conservative | 0 | 1 | 40 | 0 |
| Social Credit | 0 | 0 | 1 | 5 |

== Riding results ==
Names in bold represent cabinet ministers and the Speaker. Party leaders are italicized. The symbol " ** " indicates MLAs who are not running again.

=== Northwestern Saskatchewan ===
| Electoral district | Candidates | | | | Incumbent |
| Electoral district | Liberal | NDP | PC | Other | Incumbent |
|---|---|---|---|---|---|
| Athabasca | Allan Ray Guy; 1,397 | Tony Wood; 602 | Harry J. Houghton; 818 | | Allan Ray Guy |
| Cut Knife-Lloydminster | Ben Gulak; 2,121 | Miro Kwasnica; 2,862 | Gordon Goodfellow; 1,289 | Walter B. Hoover (Social Credit) 164 | Isidore Charles Nollet** |
| Meadow Lake | Henry Coupland; 2,394 | Martin Semchuk; 2,288 | Leo Jeannotte; 921 | | Henry Ethelbert Coupland |
| Redberry | Steve Sulatisky; 2,343 | Dick Michayluk; 2,365 | Ed Thunderchild; 510 | | Demitro Wasyl Michayluk |
| Rosthern | David Boldt; 2,950 | George Guenther; 1,466 | | | David Boldt |
| Shellbrook | Pat Moan; 2,204 | George Bowerman; 2,515 | Norval Horner; 910 | | John Marcel Cuelenaere** |
| The Battlefords | Herbert O.M. Sparrow; 3,700 | Eiling Kramer; 4,200 | | | Eiling Kramer |
| Turtleford | John Flack; 2,125 | Bob Wooff; 2,152 | Hugh E. Konsmo; 813 | | Robert Hanson Wooff |

=== Northeastern Saskatchewan ===
| Electoral district | Candidates | | | | Incumbent |
| Electoral district | Liberal | NDP | PC | Other | Incumbent |
|---|---|---|---|---|---|
| Humboldt | Mathieu Breker; 3,693 | Palma Little; 2,881 | Frank J. Martin; 720 | | Mathieu Theodore Breker |
| Kelsey | William John McHugh; 2,381 | John R. Messer; 2,473 | Carsten Johnson; 606 | | John Hewgill Brockelbank** |
| Kelvington | Bryan Bjarnason; 2,440 | Neil Byers; 2,432 | Anita M. Kubat; 659 | | Bryan Bjarnason |
| Kinistino | Lyle Rea; 2,724 | Arthur Thibault; 3,260 | | | Arthur Thibault |
| Melfort-Tisdale | Donald Lamb; 3,650 | Clarence George Willis; 4,133 | | Orville Pederson (Social Credit) 331 | Clarence George Willis |
| Nipawin | Frank Radloff; 2,454 | Walter A. Mills; 2,446 | John A. Whittome; 1,185 | | Frank Kenneth Radloff |
| Prince Albert East-Cumberland | Eldon McLachlan; 3,152 | Bill Berezowsky; 4,123 | | | Bill Berezowsky |
| Prince Albert West | Davey Steuart; 5,090 | Orville K. Hjertaas; 4,928 | | | David Gordon Steuart |

June 25, 1969, by-election: Kelvington
| Party | Candidate | Votes | % | ±% |
|---|---|---|---|---|
| NDP | Neil Byers | 3,135 | 49.90% | +5.93 |
| Liberal | Bryan Bjarnason | 2,603 | 41.43% | -2.69 |
| Prog. Conservative | Anita M. Kubat | 545 | 8.67% | -3.24 |
| Total | | 6,283 | 100.00 | |

=== West Central Saskatchewan ===
| Electoral district | Candidates | | | | Incumbent |
| Electoral district | Liberal | NDP | PC | Other | Incumbent |
|---|---|---|---|---|---|
| Arm River | Wilbert McIvor; 1,929 | Merle Snustead; 1,895 | Martin Pederson; 1,214 | | Martin Pederson |
| Biggar | Elmer McNiven; 1,571 | Woodrow S. Lloyd; 2,916 | Peter Wiebe; 1,334 | | Woodrow Lloyd |
| Elrose | George Leith; 3,081 | David Loewen; 2,957 | | | George Gordon Leith |
| Hanley | Robert Andrew Heggie; 2,282 | Robert Alexander Walker; 2,149 | | | Robert Alexander Walker |
| Kerrobert-Kindersley | William S. Howes; 3,499 | Boyd Sadler; 2,672 | | | William S. Howes |
| Rosetown | George Loken; 2,951 | Harry David Link; 2,446 | Earl Keeler; 862 | | George Fredrick Loken |
| Watrous | Percy Schmeiser; 2,622 | Hans Broten; 2,557 | Hugh Kirk; 533 | | Hans Broten |
| Wilkie | Joseph "Cliff" McIsaac; 3,817 | Norman Heather; 2,436 | | | Joseph "Cliff" McIsaac |

=== East Central Saskatchewan ===
| Electoral district | Candidates | | | | Incumbent |
| Electoral district | Liberal | NDP | PC | Other | Incumbent |
|---|---|---|---|---|---|
| Canora | Ken Romuld; 3,170 | Al Matsalla; 3,386 | | | Kenneth Gordon Romuld |
| Last Mountain | Donald MacLennan; 2,425 | Gordon MacMurchy; 2,399 | George Richardson; 995 | | Donald Gilbert MacLennan |
| Melville | James W. Gardiner; 3,463 | John Kowalchuk; 3,584 | Art Pelzer; 799 | | James Wilfrid Gardiner |
| Pelly | Jim Barrie; 3,002 | Leo Larson; 2,753 | | | Leo Larson |
| Saltcoats | **James Snedker**; 3,639 | Charles Woolfitt; 2,392 | Cliff Obre; 904 | | James Snedker |
| Touchwood | George Trapp; 2,713 | Frank Meakes; 3,002 | | | George Joseph Trapp |
| Wadena | George Fisher; 3,146 | **Fred Dewhurst**; 4,213 | | | Frederick Arthur Dewhurst |
| Yorkton | Barry Gallagher; 5,048 | Irving W. Carlson; 4,393 | | | Bernard David Gallagher |

=== Southwest Saskatchewan ===
| Electoral district | Candidates | | | | Incumbent |
| Electoral district | Liberal | NDP | PC | Other | Incumbent |
|---|---|---|---|---|---|
| Gravelbourg | Lionel Coderre; 2,385 | Norman Allan; 1,860 | Keith Mukelt; 567 | | Lionel Philas Coderre |
| Maple Creek | Alexander Cameron; 2,683 | Ernie Howes; 1,901 | Marlyn K. Clary; 955 | | Alexander C. Cameron |
| Moose Jaw North | Vic Cole; 2,725 | Gordon Snyder; 2,860 | Daniel J. Patterson; 1,126 | | Gordon Snyder |
| Moose Jaw South | Harry P. Swarbrick; 2,415 | Bill Davies; 4,674 | Nick Markewich; 1,356 | | William Gwynne Davies |
| Morse | **Ross Thatcher**; 3,396 | Louis H. Lewry; 2,398 | Earl Cooper; 694 | | Ross Thatcher |
| Notukeu-Willow Bunch | Jim Hooker; 2,772 | Allen Engel; 2,216 | | | James Benjamin Hooker |
| Shaunavon | Fernand Larochelle; 3,091 | Robert B. Fulton; 2,684 | | | Fernand Larochelle |
| Swift Current | T. Lawrence Salloum; 3,366 | Everett Irvine Wood; 4,825 | Donald C. McGowan; 1,439 | | Everett Irvine Wood |

=== Southeast Saskatchewan ===
| Electoral district | Candidates | | | | Incumbent |
| Electoral district | Liberal | NDP | PC | Other | Incumbent |
|---|---|---|---|---|---|
| Bengough | Alex Mitchell; 2,408 | Dale Leifso; 2,194 | Jim Hall; 723 | | Alexander Mitchell |
| Cannington | Tom Weatherald; 3,436 | Stanley G. Barnard; 2,377 | Glenn Brimner; 1,436 | | Thomas Milton Weatherald |
| Lumsden | Darrel Heald; 2,812 | Cliff Thurston; 2,114 | Donald K. MacPherson; 917 | | Darrel Verner Heald |
| Milestone | Cyril MacDonald; 2,491 | Fred P. Petruic; 1,920 | J.K. Glenn; 610 | | Cyril Pius MacDonald |
| Moosomin | Frank Gardner; 3,297 | William Francis Goodwin; 2,435 | Andrew Emerson Bruce; 1,956 | | E. Franklin Gardner |
| Qu'Appelle-Wolseley | Doug McFarlane; 2,990 | John Stephen Leier; 1,842 | Victor Edward Horsman; 1,401 | Lloyd Avram (Social Credit) 323 | Douglas Thomas McFarlane |
| Souris-Estevan | Ian MacDougall; 5,197 | Russell Brown; 4,335 | | | Ian Hugh MacDougall |
| Weyburn | Junior Staveley; 4,693 | Jim Pepper; 4,876 | Jean Benson; 865 | | James Auburn Pepper |

=== Saskatoon ===
| Electoral district | Candidates | | | | Incumbent |
| Electoral district | Liberal | NDP | PC | Other | Incumbent |
|---|---|---|---|---|---|
| Saskatoon City Park-University | Jeff Charlebois; 6,096 | Alex M. Nicholson; 5,410 | Mel Mills; 1,356 | | New District |
| Saskatoon Mayfair | Alex W. Prociuk; 3,576 | John Edward Brockelbank; 5,739 | Hugh Rainey; 1,432 | | New District |
| Saskatoon Nutana Centre | Clarence Estey; 6,184 | Wes Robbins; 4,902 | George Bateman; 1,170 | | New District |
| Saskatoon Nutana South | Bill Forsyth; 5,193 | Adele Smillie; 3,445 | Peter Ritchie; 1,267 | | New District |
| Saskatoon Riversdale | Margaret Gent; 2,327 | Roy Romanow; 4,888 | Emanuel Sonnenschein; 1,160 | | New District |

=== Regina ===
| Electoral district | Candidates | | | | Incumbent |
| Electoral district | Liberal | NDP | PC | Other | Incumbent |
|---|---|---|---|---|---|
| Regina Centre | Pat McKerral; 2,442 | Allan Blakeney; 4,363 | Les Youngson; 698 | Nelson Falkowsky (Social Credit) 142 | New District |
| Regina North East | Frank Gerein; 3,344 | Walt Smishek; 5,892 | Albert E. Wilson; 1,224 | | New District |
| Regina North West | Frank Kleefeld; 3,728 | Ed Whelan; 5,364 | George J. Tkach; 1,011 | H. Ken Cooper (Social Credit) 147 | New District |
| Regina South | Gordon Grant; 6,297 | Jack W. Kehoe; 2,575 | Lillian Groeller; 487 | | Gordon Burton Grant |
| Regina South East | Paul Dojack; 5,461 | Henry Baker; 5,893 | Bill Barry; 896 | | New District |
| Regina South West | Don McPherson; 5,890 | Murray Koskie; 4,076 | Dennis Braun; 1,084 | Henry Austin Hunt (Social Credit) 189 | New District |

== See also ==
- List of political parties in Saskatchewan
- List of Saskatchewan provincial electoral districts
