= 13th Saskatchewan Legislature =

The 13th Legislative Assembly of Saskatchewan was elected in the Saskatchewan general election held in June 1956. The assembly sat from February 14, 1957, to May 4, 1960. The Co-operative Commonwealth Federation (CCF) led by Tommy Douglas formed the government. The Liberal Party led by Alexander Hamilton McDonald formed the official opposition.

James Andrew Darling served as speaker for the assembly.

== Members of the Assembly ==
The following members were elected to the assembly in 1956:

Electoral district	Member	Party	First elected / previously elected	No.# of term(s)
Arm River	Gustaf Herman Danielson	Liberal	1934	6th term
Athabasca	John James Harrop	Co-operative Commonwealth	1956	1st term
Bengough	Allan Lister Samuel Brown	Co-operative Commonwealth	1944	4th term
Biggar	Woodrow Stanley Lloyd	Co-operative Commonwealth	1944	4th term
Cannington	Rosscoe Arnold McCarthy	Liberal	1949	3rd term
Canora	Alex Gordon Kuziak	Co-operative Commonwealth	1948	3rd term
Cumberland	Bill Berezowsky	Co-operative Commonwealth	1952	2nd term
Cut Knife	Isidore Charles Nollet	Co-operative Commonwealth	1944	4th term
Elrose	Maurice John Willis	Co-operative Commonwealth	1944	4th term
Gravelbourg	Lionel Philias Coderre	Liberal	1956	1st term
Hanley	Robert Alexander Walker	Co-operative Commonwealth	1948	3rd term
Humboldt	Mary John Batten	Liberal	1956	1st term
Kelsey	John Hewgill Brockelbank	Co-operative Commonwealth	1938	5th term
Kelvington	Peter Anton Howe	Co-operative Commonwealth	1938	5th term
Kerrobert-Kindersley	Eldon Arthur Johnson	Co-operative Commonwealth	1956	1st term
Kinistino	Henry Begrand	Co-operative Commonwealth	1952	2nd term
Kinistino	Arthur Thibault (1959)	Co-operative Commonwealth	1959	1st term
Last Mountain	Russell Brown	Co-operative Commonwealth	1952	2nd term
Lumsden	Clifford Honey Thurston	Co-operative Commonwealth	1956	1st term
Maple Creek	Alexander C. Cameron	Liberal	1948	3rd term
Meadow Lake	Alphonse Peter Weber	Social Credit	1956	1st term
Melfort-Tisdale	Clarence George Willis	Co-operative Commonwealth	1952	2nd term
Melville	James Wilfrid Gardiner	Liberal	1956	1st term
Milestone	Jacob Walter Erb	Co-operative Commonwealth	1948	3rd term
Moose Jaw City	Dempster Henry Ratcliffe Heming	Co-operative Commonwealth	1944	4th term
Moose Jaw City	William Gwynne Davies	Co-operative Commonwealth	1956	1st term
Moosomin	Alexander Hamilton McDonald	Liberal	1948	3rd term
Morse	James William Gibson	Co-operative Commonwealth	1946	4th term
Nipawin	Leo Nile Nicholson	Social Credit	1956	1st term
Notukeu-Willow Bunch	Karl Frank Klein	Liberal	1956	1st term
Pelly	Jim Barrie	Liberal	1956	1st term
Prince Albert	Lachlan Fraser McIntosh	Co-operative Commonwealth	1944	4th term
Qu'Appelle-Wolseley	Douglas Thomas McFarlane	Liberal	1956	1st term
Redberry	Bernard Leo Korchinski	Liberal	1948, 1956	2nd term*
Regina City	Charles Cromwell Williams	Co-operative Commonwealth	1944	4th term
Regina City	Marjorie Alexandra Cooper	Co-operative Commonwealth	1952	2nd term
Regina City	Clarence Melvin Fines	Co-operative Commonwealth	1944	4th term
Rosetown	John Taylor Douglas	Co-operative Commonwealth	1944	4th term
Rosthern	Isaak Elias	Social Credit	1956	1st term
Saltcoats	Asmundur A. Loptson	Liberal	1929, 1948	5th term*
Saskatoon City	John Henry Sturdy	Co-operative Commonwealth	1944	4th term
Saskatoon City	Arthur Thomas Stone	Co-operative Commonwealth	1944	4th term
Shaunavon	Thomas John Bentley	Co-operative Commonwealth	1949	3rd term
Shellbrook	John Thiessen	Co-operative Commonwealth	1956	1st term
Souris-Estevan	Kim Thorson	Co-operative Commonwealth	1956	1st term
Swift Current	Everett Irvine Wood	Co-operative Commonwealth	1956	1st term
The Battlefords	Eiling Kramer	Co-operative Commonwealth	1952	2nd term
Touchwood	Frank Meakes	Co-operative Commonwealth	1956	1st term
Turtleford	Frank Foley	Liberal	1956	1st term
Wadena	Frederick Arthur Dewhurst	Co-operative Commonwealth	1945	4th term
Watrous	James Andrew Darling	Co-operative Commonwealth	1944	4th term
Weyburn	Thomas Clement Douglas	Co-operative Commonwealth	1944	4th term
Wilkie	John Whitmore Horsman	Liberal	1948	3rd term
Yorkton	Frederick Neibrandt	Co-operative Commonwealth	1956	1st term

== Party Standings ==
Affiliation	Members
Co-operative Commonwealth	36
Liberal	14
Social Credit	3
Total	53
Government Majority	19

== By-elections ==
By-elections were held to replace members for various reasons:

Electoral district	Member elected	Party	Election date	Reason
Kinistino	Arthur Thibault	Co-operative Commonwealth	June 3, 1959	H Begrand died March 8, 1959
