= 12th Saskatchewan Legislature =

The 12th Legislative Assembly of Saskatchewan was elected in the Saskatchewan general election held in June 1952. The assembly sat from February 12, 1953, to May 8, 1956. The Co-operative Commonwealth Federation (CCF) led by Tommy Douglas formed the government. The Liberal Party led by Walter Adam Tucker formed the official opposition. After Tucker returned to federal politics in 1953, Asmundur Loptson served as interim Liberal Party leader. Alexander Hamilton McDonald became Liberal Party leader and leader of the opposition in 1955.

Tom Johnston served as speaker for the assembly.

== Members of the Assembly ==
The following members were elected to the assembly in 1952:

Electoral district	Member	Party	First elected / previously elected	No.# of term(s)
Arm River	Gustaf Herman Danielson	Liberal	1934	5th term
Athabasca	James Ripley	Liberal	1952	1st term
Bengough	Allan Lister Samuel Brown	Co-operative Commonwealth	1944	3rd term
Biggar	Woodrow Stanley Lloyd	Co-operative Commonwealth	1944	3rd term
Cannington	Rosscoe Arnold McCarthy	Liberal	1949	2nd term
Canora	Alex Gordon Kuziak	Co-operative Commonwealth	1948	2nd term
Cumberland	Bill Berezowsky	Co-operative Commonwealth	1952	1st term
Cut Knife	Isidore Charles Nollet	Co-operative Commonwealth	1944	3rd term
Elrose	Maurice John Willis	Co-operative Commonwealth	1944	3rd term
Gravelbourg	Edward Hazen Walker	Co-operative Commonwealth	1951	2nd term
Hanley	Robert Alexander Walker	Co-operative Commonwealth	1948	2nd term
Humboldt	Joseph William Burton	Co-operative Commonwealth	1938, 1952	2nd term*
Kelsey	John Hewgill Brockelbank	Co-operative Commonwealth	1938	4th term
Kelvington	Peter Anton Howe	Co-operative Commonwealth	1938	4th term
Kerrobert-Kindersley	John Wellbelove	Co-operative Commonwealth	1944	3rd term
Kinistino	Henry Begrand	Co-operative Commonwealth	1952	1st term
Last Mountain	Russell Brown	Co-operative Commonwealth	1952	1st term
Lumsden	William Sancho Thair	Co-operative Commonwealth	1944	3rd term
Maple Creek	Alexander C. Cameron	Liberal	1948	2nd term
Meadow Lake	Hugh Clifford Dunfield	Liberal	1952	1st term
Melfort-Tisdale	Clarence George Willis	Co-operative Commonwealth	1952	1st term
Melville	A. Percy Brown	Co-operative Commonwealth	1952	1st term
Milestone	Jacob Walter Erb	Co-operative Commonwealth	1948	2nd term
Moose Jaw City	John Wesley Corman	Co-operative Commonwealth	1944	3rd term
Moose Jaw City	Dempster Henry Ratcliffe Heming	Co-operative Commonwealth	1944	3rd term
Moosomin	Alexander Hamilton McDonald	Liberal	1948	2nd term
Morse	James William Gibson	Co-operative Commonwealth	1946	3rd term
Nipawin	Thomas Russell MacNutt	Liberal	1952	1st term
Notukeu-Willow Bunch	Niles Leonard Buchanan	Co-operative Commonwealth	1944	3rd term
Pelly	Arnold Feusi	Co-operative Commonwealth	1952	1st term
Prince Albert	Lachlan Fraser McIntosh	Co-operative Commonwealth	1944	3rd term
Qu'Appelle-Wolseley	William Henry Wahl	Co-operative Commonwealth	1952	1st term
Redberry	Dmytro Zipchen	Co-operative Commonwealth	1952	1st term
Regina City	Charles Cromwell Williams	Co-operative Commonwealth	1944	3rd term
Regina City	Clarence Melvin Fines	Co-operative Commonwealth	1944	3rd term
Regina City	Marjorie Alexandra Cooper	Co-operative Commonwealth	1952	1st term
Rosetown	John Taylor Douglas	Co-operative Commonwealth	1944	3rd term
Rosthern	Walter Adam Tucker	Liberal	1948	2nd term
Rosthern	Samuel Henry Carr (1953)	Liberal	1953	1st term
Saltcoats	Asmundur A. Loptson	Liberal	1929, 1948	4th term*
Saskatoon City	Arthur Thomas Stone	Co-operative Commonwealth	1944	3rd term
Saskatoon City	John Henry Sturdy	Co-operative Commonwealth	1944	3rd term
Shaunavon	Thomas John Bentley	Co-operative Commonwealth	1949	2nd term
Shellbrook	Louis William Larsen	Co-operative Commonwealth	1948	2nd term
Souris-Estevan	John Edward McCormack	Liberal	1948	2nd term
Souris-Estevan	Robert Kohaly (1953)	Progressive Conservative	1953	1st term
Swift Current	Harry Gibbs	Co-operative Commonwealth	1944	3rd term
The Battlefords	Eiling Kramer	Co-operative Commonwealth	1952	1st term
Touchwood	Tom Johnston	Co-operative Commonwealth	1938	4th term
Turtleford	Bob Wooff	Co-operative Commonwealth	1944, 1952	2nd term*
Wadena	Frederick Arthur Dewhurst	Co-operative Commonwealth	1945	3rd term
Watrous	James Andrew Darling	Co-operative Commonwealth	1944	3rd term
Weyburn	Thomas Clement Douglas	Co-operative Commonwealth	1944	3rd term
Wilkie	John Whitmore Horsman	Liberal	1948	2nd term
Yorkton	Arthur Percy Swallow	Co-operative Commonwealth	1944	3rd term

== Party Standings ==
Affiliation	Members
Co-operative Commonwealth	42
Liberal	11
Total	53
Government Majority	31

== By-elections ==
By-elections were held to replace members for various reasons:

Electoral district	Member elected	Party	Election date	Reason
Rosthern	Samuel Henry Carr	Liberal	October 28, 1953	WA Tucker ran for federal seat
Souris-Estevan	Robert Kohaly	Progressive Conservative	October 28, 1953	JE McCormack died March 14, 1953
