= 17th Saskatchewan Legislature =

The 17th Legislative Assembly of Saskatchewan was elected in the Saskatchewan general election held in June 1971. The assembly sat from July 28, 1971, to May 13, 1975. The New Democratic Party (NDP) led by Allan Blakeney formed the government. The Liberal Party formed the official opposition. After Ross Thatcher's death in July 1971, David Steuart became party leader in December 1971.

Frederick Arthur Dewhurst served as speaker for the assembly.

== Members of the Assembly ==
The following members were elected to the assembly in 1971:

Electoral district	Member	Party	First elected / previously elected	No.# of term(s)
Arm River	Donald Leonard Faris	New Democratic Party	1971	1st term
Assiniboia-Bengough	David Hadley Lange	New Democratic Party	1971	1st term
Athabasca	Allan Ray Guy	Liberal	1960	4th term
Biggar	Elwood Lorrie Cowley	New Democratic Party	1971	1st term
Cannington	Thomas Milton Weatherald	Liberal	1964	3rd term
Canora	Al Matsalla	New Democratic Party	1967	2nd term
Cut Knife	Miro Kwasnica	New Democratic Party	1967	2nd term
Elrose	Hayden William Owens	New Democratic Party	1971	1st term
Gravelbourg	Reginald John Gross	New Democratic Party	1971	1st term
Hanley	Paul Peter Mostoway	New Democratic Party	1971	1st term
Humboldt	Edwin Laurence Tchorzewski	New Democratic Party	1971	1st term
Kelvington	Neil Erland Byers	New Democratic Party	1969	2nd term
Kerrobert-Kindersley	Alex Taylor	New Democratic Party	1971	1st term
Last Mountain	Gordon S. MacMurchy	New Democratic Party	1971	1st term
Lumsden	John Gary Lane	Liberal	1971	1st term
Maple Creek	Gene Flasch	New Democratic Party	1971	1st term
Meadow Lake	Henry Ethelbert Coupland	Liberal	1964	3rd term
Melfort-Kinistino	Arthur Thibault	New Democratic Party	1959	5th term
Melville	John Russell Kowalchuk	New Democratic Party	1967	2nd term
Milestone	Cyril Pius MacDonald	Liberal	1964	3rd term
Moose Jaw North	Donald Forrest MacDonald	Liberal	1971	1st term
Moose Jaw South	Gordon Taylor Snyder	New Democratic Party	1960	4th term
Moosomin	Ernest Franklin Gardner	Liberal	1965	3rd term
Morse	Wilbert Ross Thatcher	Liberal	1960	4th term
Morse	John Edward Niel Wiebe (1971)	Liberal	1971	1st term
Nipawin	John Kristian Comer	New Democratic Party	1971	1st term
Notukeu-Willow Bunch	Allen Willard Engel	New Democratic Party	1971	1st term
Pelly	Leonard Larson	New Democratic Party	1964, 1971	2nd term*
Prince Albert East	Mike Feschuk	New Democratic Party	1971	1st term
Prince Albert West	David Gordon Steuart	Liberal	1962	4th term
Qu'Appelle-Wolseley	Terry Lyle Hanson	New Democratic Party	1971	1st term
Redberry	Demitro (Dick) Wasyl Michayluk	New Democratic Party	1960	4th term
Regina Albert Park	Kenneth Roy MacLeod	Liberal	1971	1st term
Regina Centre	Allan Emrys Blakeney	New Democratic Party	1960	4th term
Regina Lakeview	Donald Mighton McPherson	Liberal	1967	2nd term
Regina Lakeview	Edward Cyril Malone (1973)	Liberal	1973	1st term
Regina North East	Walter Smishek	New Democratic Party	1964	3rd term
Regina North West	Edward Charles Whelan	New Democratic Party	1960	4th term
Regina Wascana	Henry Harold Peter Baker	New Democratic Party	1964	3rd term
Regina Whitmore Park	Gordon Burton Grant	Liberal	1964	3rd term
Rosetown	George Fredrick Loken	Liberal	1964	3rd term
Rosthern	David Boldt	Liberal	1960	4th term
Saltcoats	Ed Kaeding	New Democratic Party	1971	1st term
Saskatoon City Park	Beverly Milton Dyck	New Democratic Party	1971	1st term
Saskatoon Mayfair	John Edward Brockelbank	New Democratic Party	1964	3rd term
Saskatoon Nutana Centre	Wesley Albert Robbins	New Democratic Party	1964, 1971	2nd term*
Saskatoon Nutana South	Herman Rolfes	New Democratic Party	1971	1st term
Saskatoon Riversdale	Roy John Romanow	New Democratic Party	1967	2nd term
Saskatoon University	John Guyon Richards	New Democratic Party	1971	1st term
Saskatoon University	John Guyon Richards	Independent	1971	1st term
Shaunavon	Allan Roy Oliver	New Democratic Party	1971	1st term
Shellbrook	George Reginald Anderson Bowerman	New Democratic Party	1967	2nd term
Souris-Estevan	Russell Brown	New Democratic Party	1952, (Note: Last Mountain) 1971	4th term*
Souris-Estevan	Kim Thorson (1971)	New Democratic Party	1956, 1971	2nd term*
Swift Current	Everett Irvine Wood	New Democratic Party	1956	5th term
The Battlefords	Eiling Kramer	New Democratic Party	1952	6th term
Tisdale-Kelsey	John Rissler Messer	New Democratic Party	1967	2nd term
Touchwood	Frank Meakes	New Democratic Party	1956, 1967	4th term*
Turtleford	Michael Feduniak	New Democratic Party	1971	1st term
Wadena	Frederick Arthur Dewhurst	New Democratic Party	1945	8th term
Watrous	Donald William Cody	New Democratic Party	1971	1st term
Weyburn	James Auburn Pepper	New Democratic Party	1964	3rd term
Wilkie	Joseph Clifford McIsaac	Liberal	1964	3rd term
Yorkton	Irving Wensley Carlson	New Democratic Party	1971	1st term

== Party Standings ==
Affiliation	Members
New Democratic Party	45
Liberal	15
Total	60
Government Majority	30

== By-elections ==
By-elections were held to replace members for various reasons:

Electoral district	Member elected	Party	Election date	Reason
Morse	John Edward Niel Wiebe	Liberal	December 1, 1971	WR Thatcher died in July 1971
Souris-Estevan	Kim Thorson	New Democratic Party	December 1, 1971	R Brown died in October 1971
Athabasca	Allan Ray Guy	Liberal	September 27, 1972	Election results declared invalid
Regina Lakeview	Edward Cyril Malone	Liberal	December 5, 1973	DM McPherson died in September 1973
