= 11th Saskatchewan Legislature =

The 11th Legislative Assembly of Saskatchewan was elected in the Saskatchewan general election held in June 1948. The assembly sat from February 10, 1949, to May 7, 1952. The Co-operative Commonwealth Federation (CCF) led by Tommy Douglas formed the government. The Liberal Party led by Walter Adam Tucker formed the official opposition.

Tom Johnston served as speaker for the assembly.

== Members of the Assembly ==
The following members were elected to the assembly in 1948:

Electoral district	Member	Party	First elected / previously elected	No.# of term(s)
Arm River	Gustaf Herman Danielson	Liberal	1934	4th term
Athabasca	Louis Marcien Marion	Independent	1944 (Note: First elected as a Liberal)	2nd term
Bengough	Allan Lister Samuel Brown	Co-operative Commonwealth	1944	2nd term
Biggar	Woodrow Stanley Lloyd	Co-operative Commonwealth	1944	2nd term
Cannington	William John Patterson	Liberal	1921	7th term
Cannington	Rosscoe Arnold McCarthy (1949)	Liberal	1949	1st term
Canora	Alex Gordon Kuziak	Co-operative Commonwealth	1948	1st term
Cumberland	Lorne Earl Blanchard	Liberal	1944	2nd term
Cut Knife	Isidore Charles Nollet	Co-operative Commonwealth	1944	2nd term
Elrose	Maurice John Willis	Co-operative Commonwealth	1944	2nd term
Gravelbourg	Edward Milton Culliton	Liberal	1935, 1948	3rd term*
Gravelbourg	Edward Hazen Walker (1951)	Co-operative Commonwealth	1951	1st term
Gull Lake	Alvin Cecil Murray	Co-operative Commonwealth	1944	2nd term
Gull Lake	Thomas John Bentley (1949)	Co-operative Commonwealth	1949	1st term
Hanley	Robert Alexander Walker	Co-operative Commonwealth	1948	1st term
Humboldt	Arnold William Loehr	Liberal	1948	1st term
Kelvington	Peter Anton Howe	Co-operative Commonwealth	1938	3rd term
Kerrobert-Kindersley	John Wellbelove	Co-operative Commonwealth	1944	2nd term
Kinistino	William Carlton Woods	Liberal	1948	1st term
Last Mountain	Jacob Benson	Co-operative Commonwealth	1929, (Note: First elected as Progressive) 1938	4th term*
Last Mountain	Jacob Benson	Independent	1929, 1938	4th term*
Lumsden	William Sancho Thair	Co-operative Commonwealth	1944	2nd term
Maple Creek	Alexander C. Cameron	Liberal	1948	1st term
Meadow Lake	William Thorneycroft Lofts	Liberal	1948	1st term
Melfort	John George Egnatoff	Liberal	1948	1st term
Melville	V. Patrick Deshaye	Liberal	1948	1st term
Milestone	Jacob Walter Erb	Co-operative Commonwealth	1948	1st term
Moose Jaw City	John Wesley Corman	Co-operative Commonwealth	1944	2nd term
Moose Jaw City	Dempster Henry Ratcliffe Heming	Co-operative Commonwealth	1944	2nd term
Moosomin	Alexander Hamilton McDonald	Conservative Liberal	1948	1st term
Moosomin	Alexander Hamilton McDonald	Liberal	1948	1st term
Morse	James William Gibson	Co-operative Commonwealth	1946	2nd term
Notukeu-Willow Bunch	Niles Leonard Buchanan	Co-operative Commonwealth	1944	2nd term
Pelly	John Gray Banks	Liberal	1948	1st term
Prince Albert	Lachlan Fraser McIntosh	Co-operative Commonwealth	1944	2nd term
Qu'Appelle-Wolseley	Frederick Middleton Dundas	Liberal	1934, 1948	3rd term*
Redberry	Bernard Leo Korchinski	Liberal	1948	1st term
Regina City	Charles Cromwell Williams	Co-operative Commonwealth	1944	2nd term
Regina City	Clarence Melvin Fines	Co-operative Commonwealth	1944	2nd term
Rosetown	John Taylor Douglas	Co-operative Commonwealth	1944	2nd term
Rosthern	Walter Adam Tucker	Liberal	1948	1st term
Saltcoats	Asmundur A. Loptson	Liberal	1929, 1948	3rd term*
Saskatoon City	Arthur Thomas Stone	Co-operative Commonwealth	1944	2nd term
Saskatoon City	John Henry Sturdy	Co-operative Commonwealth	1944	2nd term
Shellbrook	Louis William Larsen	Co-operative Commonwealth	1948	1st term
Souris-Estevan	John Edward McCormack	Liberal	1948	1st term
Swift Current	Harry Gibbs	Co-operative Commonwealth	1944	2nd term
The Battlefords	Paul Prince	Liberal	1940, 1948	2nd term*
The Battlefords	Hugh James Maher (1950)	Liberal	1950	1st term
Tisdale	John Hewgill Brockelbank	Co-operative Commonwealth	1938	3rd term
Torch River	John Robert Denike	Co-operative Commonwealth	1948	1st term
Touchwood	Tom Johnston	Co-operative Commonwealth	1938	3rd term
Turtleford	Leo Trippe	Liberal	1948	1st term
Wadena	Frederick Arthur Dewhurst	Co-operative Commonwealth	1945	2nd term
Watrous	James Andrew Darling	Co-operative Commonwealth	1944	2nd term
Weyburn	Thomas Clement Douglas	Co-operative Commonwealth	1944	2nd term
Wilkie	John Whitmore Horsman	Liberal	1948	1st term
Yorkton	Arthur Percy Swallow	Co-operative Commonwealth	1944	2nd term

== Party Standings ==
Affiliation	Members
Co-operative Commonwealth	31
Liberal	19
Independent	1
Conservative Liberal	1
Total	52
Government Majority	10

== By-elections ==
By-elections were held to replace members for various reasons:

Electoral district	Member elected	Party	Election date	Reason
Cannington	Rosscoe Arnold McCarthy	Liberal	November 10, 1949	WJ Patterson named to federal Board of Transport Commissioners
Gull Lake	Thomas John Bentley	Co-operative Commonwealth	November 10, 1949	AC Murray died in September 1949
The Battlefords	Hugh James Maher	Liberal	February 8, 1950	P Prince died December 17, 1949
Gravelbourg	Edward Hazen Walker	Co-operative Commonwealth	July 10, 1951	EM Culliton named to Saskatchewan Court of Appeal
