= Speaker of the Legislative Assembly of Saskatchewan =

Presiding officer of Canadian provincial legislature

The Speaker of the Legislative Assembly of Saskatchewan is the presiding officer of the Saskatchewan Legislature.

== Speakers of the Legislative Assembly of Saskatchewan ==
No.	Name Electoral district (Birth–Death)	Term of office	Party	Legislature
1	Thomas MacNutt; MLA for Saltcoats (1850–1927)	1905–1908	Liberal	1st
2	William Charles Sutherland; MLA for Saskatoon County (1865–1940)	1908–1912	Liberal	2nd
3	John Albert Sheppard; MLA for Moose Jaw County (1875–1947)	1912–1916	Liberal	3rd
4	Robert Menzies Mitchell; MLA for Weyburn (1865–1932)	1917–1919	Liberal	3rd
4	Robert Menzies Mitchell; MLA for Weyburn (1865–1932)	1917–1919	Liberal	4th
5	George Adam Scott; MLA for Arm River (1874–1963)	1919–1925	Liberal	4th
5	George Adam Scott; MLA for Arm River (1874–1963)	1919–1925	Liberal	5th
6	Walter George Robinson; MLA for Francis (1873–1949)	1925–1929	Liberal	6th
7	James Fraser Bryant; MLA for Lumsden (1877–1945)	1929	Conservative	7th
8	Robert Sterritt Leslie; MLA for Weyburn (1875–1958)	1930–1934	Progressive	7th
9	John Mason Parker; MLA for Touchwood (1882–1960)	1934–1938	Liberal	8th
10	Charles Agar; MLA for Hanley (1882–1962)	1939–1944	Liberal	9th
11	Tom Johnston; MLA for Touchwood (1881–1969)	1944–1956	Co-operative Commonwealth	10th
11	Tom Johnston; MLA for Touchwood (1881–1969)	1944–1956	Co-operative Commonwealth	11th
11	Tom Johnston; MLA for Touchwood (1881–1969)	1944–1956	Co-operative Commonwealth	12th
12	James Andrew Darling; MLA for Watrous (1891–1979)	1957–1960	Co-operative Commonwealth	13th
13	Everett Irvine Wood; MLA for Swift Current (1910–1983)	1961	Co-operative Commonwealth	14th
14	Frederick Arthur Dewhurst; MLA for Wadena (1911–1985)	1962–1964	Co-operative Commonwealth	14th
15	James Snedker; MLA for Saltcoats (1911–1981)	1965–1971	Liberal	15th
15	James Snedker; MLA for Saltcoats (1911–1981)	1965–1971	Liberal	16th
16	Frederick Arthur Dewhurst; MLA for Wadena (1911–1985)	1971–1975	New Democratic	17th
17	John Edward Brockelbank; MLA for Saskatoon Westmount (1931–2020)	1975–1982	New Democratic	18th
17	John Edward Brockelbank; MLA for Saskatoon Westmount (1931–2020)	1975–1982	New Democratic	19th
18	Herbert Swan; MLA for Rosetown-Elrose (1927–2013)	1982–1986	Progressive Conservative	20th
19	Arnold Tusa; MLA for Last Mountain-Touchwood (born 1940)	1986–1991	Progressive Conservative	21st
20	Herman Rolfes; MLA for Saskatoon Nutana (born 1936)	1991–1996	New Democratic	22nd
21	Glenn Hagel; MLA for Moose Jaw North (born 1949)	1996–1999	New Democratic	23rd
22	Ron Osika; MLA for Melville (born 1939)	1999–2001	Liberal	24th
23	Myron Kowalsky; MLA for Prince Albert Carlton (1941–2022)	2001–2007	New Democratic	24th
23	Myron Kowalsky; MLA for Prince Albert Carlton (1941–2022)	2001–2007	New Democratic	25th
24	Don Toth; MLA for Moosomin (born 1948)	2007–2011	Saskatchewan	26th
25	Dan D'Autremont; MLA for Cannington (born 1950)	2011–2016	Saskatchewan	27th
26	Corey Tochor; MLA for Saskatoon Eastview (born 1976 or 1977)	2016–2018	Saskatchewan	28th
27	Mark Docherty; MLA for Regina Coronation Park (born 1960 or 1961)	2018–2020	Saskatchewan	28th
28	Randy Weekes; MLA for Biggar-Sask Valley (born 1956)	2020–2024	Saskatchewan	29th
28	Randy Weekes; MLA for Biggar-Sask Valley (born 1956)	2020–2024	Independent	29th
29	Todd Goudy; MLA for Melfort	2024–present	Saskatchewan	30th

== See also ==
- Speaker (politics)
