= 18th Saskatchewan Legislature =

The 18th Legislative Assembly of Saskatchewan was elected in the Saskatchewan general election held in June 1975. The assembly sat from November 12, 1975, to September 19, 1978. The New Democratic Party (NDP) led by Allan Blakeney formed the government. The Liberal Party led by David Steuart formed the official opposition. Edward Malone replaced Steuart as party leader in 1976. After the Progressive Conservative Party won two by-elections and convinced two Liberal members to defect in 1977, the Progressive Conservative Party led by Richard Lee Collver shared the role of official opposition with the Liberals.

John Edward Brockelbank served as speaker for the assembly.

== Members of the Assembly ==
The following members were elected to the assembly in 1975:

Electoral district	Member	Party	First elected / previously elected	No.# of term(s)
Arm River	Donald Leonard Faris	New Democratic Party	1971	2nd term
Assiniboia-Bengough	Roy Edgar Nelson	Liberal	1975	1st term
Athabasca	Frederick John Thompson	New Democratic Party	1975	1st term
Bengough-Milestone	David Hadley Lange	New Democratic Party	1971	2nd term
Biggar	Elwood Lorrie Cowley	New Democratic Party	1971	2nd term
Canora	Al Matsalla	New Democratic Party	1967	3rd term
Cumberland	Norman H. MacAuley	New Democratic Party	1975	1st term
Cut Knife-Lloydminster	Miro Kwasnica	New Democratic Party	1967	3rd term
Estevan	Robert Austin Larter	Progressive Conservative	1975	1st term
Humboldt	Edwin Laurence Tchorzewski	New Democratic Party	1971	2nd term
Indian Head-Wolseley	Cyril Pius MacDonald	Liberal	1964	4th term
Kelsey-Tisdale	John Rissler Messer	New Democratic Party	1967	3rd term
Kelvington-Wadena	Neil Erland Byers	New Democratic Party	1969	3rd term
Kindersley	Allan Neil McMillan	Liberal	1975	1st term
Kinistino	Arthur Thibault	New Democratic Party	1959	6th term
Last Mountain-Touchwood	Gordon S. MacMurchy	New Democratic Party	1971	2nd term
Maple Creek	William Harry Stodalka	Liberal	1975	1st term
Meadow Lake	Gordon James McNeill	New Democratic Party	1975	1st term
Melfort	Norman Vickar	New Democratic Party	1975	1st term
Melville	John Russell Kowalchuk	New Democratic Party	1967	3rd term
Moose Jaw North	John Leroy Skoberg	New Democratic Party	1975	1st term
Moose Jaw South	Gordon Taylor Snyder	New Democratic Party	1960	5th term
Moosomin	Larry Birkbeck	Progressive Conservative	1975	1st term
Morse	John Edward Niel Wiebe	Liberal	1971	2nd term
Nipawin	Richard Lee Collver	Progressive Conservative	1975	1st term
Pelly	Leonard Larson	New Democratic Party	1964, 1971	3rd term*
Pelly	Norm Lusney (1977)	New Democratic Party	1977	1st term
Prince Albert	Mike Feschuk	New Democratic Party	1971	2nd term
Prince Albert-Duck Lake	David Gordon Steuart	Liberal	1962	5th term
Prince Albert-Duck Lake	Garnet Norman Wipf (1977)	Progressive Conservative	1977	1st term
Qu'Appelle	John Gary Lane	Liberal	1971	2nd term
Qu'Appelle	John Gary Lane	Progressive Conservative	1971	2nd term
Quill Lakes	Murray James Koskie	New Democratic Party	1975	1st term
Redberry	Dennis Banda	New Democratic Party	1975	1st term
Regina Centre	Edward Blain Shillington	New Democratic Party	1975	1st term
Regina Elphinstone	Allan Emrys Blakeney	New Democratic Party	1960	5th term
Regina Lakeview	Edward Cyril Malone	Liberal	1973	2nd term
Regina North East	Walter Smishek	New Democratic Party	1964	4th term
Regina North West	Edward Charles Whelan	New Democratic Party	1960	5th term
Regina Rosemont	Bill Allen	New Democratic Party	1975	1st term
Regina South	Stuart John Cameron	Liberal	1975	1st term
Regina Victoria	Henry Harold Peter Baker	New Democratic Party	1964	4th term
Regina Wascana	E.F. Anthony Merchant	Liberal	1975	1st term
Rosetown-Elrose	Roy Hardeman Bailey	Progressive Conservative	1975	1st term
Rosthern	Ralph Katzman	Progressive Conservative	1975	1st term
Saltcoats	Ed Kaeding	New Democratic Party	1971	2nd term
Saskatoon Buena Vista	Herman Rolfes	New Democratic Party	1971	2nd term
Saskatoon Centre	Paul Peter Mostoway	New Democratic Party	1971	2nd term
Saskatoon Eastview	Glen Howard Penner	Liberal	1975	1st term
Saskatoon Mayfair	Beverly Milton Dyck	New Democratic Party	1971	2nd term
Saskatoon Nutana	Wesley Albert Robbins	New Democratic Party	1964, 1971	3rd term*
Saskatoon Riversdale	Roy John Romanow	New Democratic Party	1967	3rd term
Saskatoon Sutherland	Evelyn Grace Edwards	Liberal	1975	1st term
Saskatoon Sutherland	Harold William Lane (1977)	Progressive Conservative	1977	1st term
Saskatoon Westmount	John Edward Brockelbank	New Democratic Party	1964	4th term
Shaunavon	Eiliv (Sonny) Anderson	Liberal	1975	1st term
Shellbrook	George Reginald Anderson Bowerman	New Democratic Party	1967	3rd term
Souris-Cannington	Eric Arthur Berntson	Progressive Conservative	1975	1st term
Swift Current	Dennis Marvin Ham	Progressive Conservative	1975	1st term
The Battlefords	Eiling Kramer	New Democratic Party	1952	7th term
Thunder Creek	Wilbert Colin Thatcher	Liberal	1975	1st term
Thunder Creek	Wilbert Colin Thatcher	Progressive Conservative	1975	1st term
Turtleford	Lloyd Emmett Johnson	New Democratic Party	1975	1st term
Weyburn	James Auburn Pepper	New Democratic Party	1964	4th term
Wilkie	Linda Clifford	Liberal	1975	1st term
Yorkton	Randall Neil Nelson	New Democratic Party	1975	1st term

== Party Standings ==
Affiliation	Members
New Democratic	39
Liberal	15
Progressive Conservative	7
Total	61
Government Majority	17

== By-elections ==
By-elections were held to replace members for various reasons:

Electoral district	Member elected	Party	Election date	Reason
Prince Albert-Duck Lake	Garnet Norman Wipf	Progressive Conservative	March 2, 1977	DG Steuart named to Senate of Canada
Saskatoon Sutherland	Harold William Lane	Progressive Conservative	March 2, 1977	EG Edwards died in 1976
Pelly	Norm Lusney	New Democratic Party	June 8, 1977	LM Larsen died March 1977
