= James Bidwell Smith =

Canadian politician

Member of the Legislative Assembly of Saskatchewan for Bengough
- In office 1934–1938
- Preceded by: Herman Kersler Warren
- Succeeded by: Herman Kersler Warren

Personal details
- Born: Hilton, Ontario
- Died: May 9, 1952 (aged 71) Assiniboia, Saskatchewan
- Party: Saskatchewan Liberal Party

James Bidwell Smith was a Canadian politician from the province of Saskatchewan. He represented Bengough on the Legislative Assembly of Saskatchewan from 1934 to 1938.

He was born in Hilton, Ontario. He died on May 9, 1952 in Assiniboia, Saskatchewan.
