= Herman Kersler Warren =

Canadian politician

Herman Kerster Warren (September 26, 1883 – May 27, 1968) was a farmer and political figure in Saskatchewan. He represented Bengough from 1929 to 1934 as a Conservative and from 1938 to 1944 as a Unity Party member in the Legislative Assembly of Saskatchewan.

He was born in Oak River, Manitoba, the son of Joseph Henry Warren, and educated in Brandon. In 1912, Warren married Clara Margaret Titmus. He was defeated by James Bidwell Smith when he ran for reelection to the provincial assembly in 1934, but then defeated Smith in the 1938 general election. In 1935, he ran unsuccessfully for the Wood Mountain seat in the Canadian House of Commons as a Social Credit candidate. After being elected as a Unity Party member in 1938, Warren later sat as a supporter of the CCF in the provincial assembly. He later served 12 years as a member of the Provincial Mediation Board.
