= Thomas Evan Gamble =

Canadian politician

Thomas Evan Gamble (April 2, 1883 – August 2, 1931) was an English-born farmer and political figure in Saskatchewan. He represented Bengough in the Legislative Assembly of Saskatchewan from 1917 to 1929 as a Liberal.

He was born in Rothwell, Northants, the son of Thomas Gamble, and was educated there and in Derbyshire. In 1911, Gamble married Teressia Mary Lockhart. He was president of the Ogema Agricultural Society and of the Key West Grain Growers Local Association. Gamble served on the Ogema school board and was a member of the council for the rural municipality of Key West, also serving as reeve.
