= Joseph Jeffrey Charlebois =

Canadian politician

Joseph Jeffrey "Jeff" Charlebois (April 27, 1909 – February 25, 1986) was a businessman and political figure in Saskatchewan. He represented Saskatoon City Park-University from 1967 to 1971 in the Legislative Assembly of Saskatchewan as a Liberal.

He was born in Saskatoon, Saskatchewan, the son of Alex Charlebois, and was educated there. In 1939, Charlebois took over the operation of the roofing and sheet metal business established by his father, A.L. Charlebois Ltd. He also served as president of the Saskatoon Board of Trade.

During World War II, he served in the Royal Canadian Air Force. Charlebois was an alderman for Saskatoon from 1965 to 1966 and served on the Saskatoon Catholic School Board. He was president of the Canada Winter Games held in Saskatoon in 1971.

He was defeated by John Richards when he ran for reelection in the riding of Saskatoon University in 1971.

Charlebois died in Yuma, Arizona at the age of 76.
