= Hjalmar Reinhold Dahlman =

Canadian politician

Hjalmar Reinhold "Ray" Dahlman (June 3, 1909 – October 7, 1993) was a farmer and political figure in Saskatchewan. He represented Bengough from 1960 to 1964 in the Legislative Assembly of Saskatchewan as a Co-operative Commonwealth Federation (CCF) member.

The son of August Dahlman and Martha Holmgren both natives of Sweden, he was born on the family farm near Estevan, Saskatchewan and was educated in the area. Dahlman worked on the family farm and then settled on his own farm near Readlyn. He served 11 years on the Hepworth School Board, serving six terms as chair, and then served six years on the Assiniboia School Unit Board. Dahlman also served as district delegate to the Saskatchewan Wheat Pool and as president of the local co-op. In 1932, he married Myrtle Linda Wagenius. He was defeated when he ran for reelection to the Saskatchewan assembly in 1964 and again in a 1966 by-election. Dahlman died in Saskatoon at the age of 84.
