= Clifford Benjamin Peterson =

Canadian politician

Clifford Benjamin "Cliff" Peterson (June 20, 1905 – July 5, 1979) was a farmer and political figure in Saskatchewan. He represented Kelvington from 1960 to 1964 in the Legislative Assembly of Saskatchewan as a Co-operative Commonwealth Federation (CCF) member.

He was born in Sault Ste. Marie, Ontario, the son of Peter Ludwig Peterson and Johanna Asplund, both natives of Sweden, and was educated in Robsart, Saskatchewan, where he moved with his family in 1910. In 1932, he married Mabel Beatrice Eliason. Peterson lived in Kuroki and was a director of the Kuroki Rural Telephone Company and president of the Kuroki Co-op Association.
