= Junior Herbert Staveley =

Canadian politician

Junior Herbert Staveley (December 25, 1909 – January 6, 1989) was a Canadian politician who represented Weyburn as a Liberal in the Legislative Assembly of Saskatchewan from December 13, 1961 to March 18, 1964.

Staveley previously served as mayor of Weyburn, Saskatchewan. He died in Victoria, British Columbia in 1989, aged 79.
