= Samuel Karnarvon Asbell =

Canadian politician

Samuel Karnarvon Asbell (October 24, 1914 – October 10, 1965) was a farmer, farm implement dealer and political figure in Saskatchewan. He represented Bengough from 1964 to 1966 in the Legislative Assembly of Saskatchewan as a Liberal.

He was born in Winnipeg, Manitoba, the son of Joseph Asbell and Margaret Bookhalter, and was educated in Horizon, Saskatchewan, Viceroy and Regina. In 1946, he married Mickie Deitch. Asbell served on the town council for Assiniboia. He ran unsuccessfully for a seat in the Saskatchewan assembly in 1956 and 1960 before being elected in 1964. Asbell died in office at the age of 50.
