= Allan Lister Samuel Brown =

Canadian politician and farmer

Allan Lister Samuel Brown (February 23, 1917 – January 4, 1985) was a farmer and political figure in Saskatchewan. He represented Bengough from 1944 to 1960 in the Legislative Assembly of Saskatchewan as a Co-operative Commonwealth Federation (CCF) member.

He was born in Readlyn, Saskatchewan, the son of William James C. Brown and Bessie Clinton. Brown was educated there and went on to study agriculture at the University of Saskatchewan. He lived in Readlyn. Brown served as a delegate to the Saskatchewan Wheat Pool, was chairman of the local co-op association and served on the board of directors of the local credit union.
