= Alexander Mitchell (Saskatchewan politician) =

Canadian politician

Alexander Mitchell (July 27, 1912 – July 26, 2003) was a farmer and political figure in Saskatchewan. He represented Bengough from 1966 to 1971 in the Legislative Assembly of Saskatchewan as a Liberal.

He was born on the family farm in Cardross, Saskatchewan and was educated there and in Moose Jaw. In 1935, Mitchell married Mary Gall. He earned a pilot's license and later purchased his own airplane; he was an active member of the Saskatchewan Flying Farmers Association. Mitchell was first elected to the assembly in a 1966 by-election held following the death of Samuel Asbell.
