= Gordon Burton Grant =

Canadian politician (1910–2001)

Gordon Burton Grant (September 13, 1910 – January 16, 2001) was a Canadian real estate and insurance agent and political figure in Saskatchewan. He represented Regina South and then Regina Whitmore Park in the Legislative Assembly of Saskatchewan from 1964 to 1975 as a Liberal.

He was born in Regina, Saskatchewan, the son of William Grant and Margaret Moses, and was educated there, at the University of British Columbia, the University of Toronto and the University of Saskatchewan. In 1935, he married Eileen Briggs. Grant served on the local school board and on Regina city council and was mayor from 1952 to 1953. He was a member of the provincial cabinet, serving as Minister of Highways and Transportation from 1964 to 1966, as Minister of Telephones from 1964 to 1965 and from 1970 to 1971, as Minister of Industry and Information from 1964 to 1965, as Minister of Industry and Commerce from 1965 to 1967 and as Minister of Public Health from 1966 to 1971. During his tenure as health minister, the province's government introduced user fees for health services as part of the so-called "Black Friday budget" and closed 11 rural hospitals. Grant served as whip from 1971 to 1975 when the Liberals formed the official opposition. After retiring from politics in 1975, he moved to Kelowna, British Columbia. His first wife died in 1998; Grant later married his second wife, Helen. He died in Kelowna at the age of 90 from pneumonia.

== Electoral history ==
1971 Saskatchewan general election: Regina Whitmore Park
Party	Candidate	Votes	%	±%
Liberal	Gordon Grant	3,777	65.85%	-1.43
NDP	Art Lloyd	1,959	34.15%	+6.64
Total		5,736	100.00%	

1967 Saskatchewan general election: Regina South
Party	Candidate	Votes	%	±%
Liberal	Gordon Grant	6,297	67.28%	-2.08
NDP	Jack W. Kehoe	2,575	27.51%	-3.13
Progressive Conservative	Lillian Groeller	487	5.21%	–
Total		9,359	100.00%	

1964 Saskatchewan general election: Regina South
Party	Candidate	Votes	%	±%
Liberal	Gordon Grant	7,788	69.36%	–
CCF	George R. Bothwell	3,440	30.64%	–
Total		11,228	100.00%	
