= John Hewgill Brockelbank =

Canadian politician

Leader of the Opposition (Saskatchewan)
- In office 1941–1944
- Preceded by: George Hara Williams
- Succeeded by: William John Patterson

Member of the Legislative Assembly of Saskatchewan
- In office 1952–1967
- Preceded by: new district
- Succeeded by: John Rissler Messer
- Constituency: Kelsey
- In office 1938–1952
- Preceded by: Harvie James Dorrance
- Succeeded by: district abolished
- Constituency: Tisdale

Personal details
- Born: June 24, 1897
- Died: May 30, 1977 (aged 79)
- Party: Saskatchewan CCF

John Hewgill Brockelbank (June 24, 1897 – May 30, 1977) was a politician in Saskatchewan, Canada, who served as leader of the opposition in the Legislative Assembly of Saskatchewan.

Born in Grey County, Ontario, Brockebank moved to Saskatchewan with his parents in 1911 to a homestead near North Battleford. After returning from service in World War I, he established his own farm near Bjorkdale in northeastern Saskatchewan.

He was an activist in the farmers movement and was elected to the Saskatchewan legislature representing the Tisdale district for the Saskatchewan Co-operative Commonwealth Federation (CCF) in the 1938 provincial election. He served in the legislature until his retirement in 1967 and became an expert in parliamentary procedure.

In 1941, he became Leader of the Opposition when party leader George Hara Williams resigned his seat to enlist in the Canadian Army during World War II. He was defeated in his attempt to win the party leadership by Tommy Douglas in 1942 and again in 1943 but remained Leader of the Opposition until 1944 as Douglas did not have a seat in the provincial legislature. When the CCF formed government for the first time following the 1944 provincial election Douglas appointed Brockelbank to Cabinet as Minister of Municipal Affairs. He became Minister of Natural Resources following the 1948 election and retained that position for fourteen years. As Natural Resources minister, Brockelbank oversaw the growth of the potash and oil industries in the province.

In 1962 Douglas' successor as Premier, Woodrow Lloyd, appointed Brockelbank to the position of Provincial Treasurer and Deputy Premier.

The Saskatchewan CCF-NDP (as it had become known following the creation of the federal New Democratic Party (NDP) was defeated by the Saskatchewan Liberal Party in the 1964 general election but Brockelbank retained his seat and moved to the opposition benches. He retired at the 1967 general election but remained active with the NDP until his death ten years later.

Brockelbank died at the age of 79 after being involved in a car accident.

His son John Edward also served in the Saskatchewan assembly.
