= Bryan Harvey Bjarnason =

Canadian politician (1924–2022)

Bryan Harvey Bjarnason (April 2, 1924 – September 8, 2022) was a Canadian real estate and insurance agent and political figure in Saskatchewan. He represented Kelvington from 1964 to 1969 in the Legislative Assembly of Saskatchewan as a Liberal. His election to the provincial assembly in 1967 was declared invalid and he lost the subsequent by-election held in 1969 to Neil Byers.

Bjarnason was born in Dana, Saskatchewan in April 1924, the son of John Helgi Bjarnason and Bjarnina Thorsteinson, both being of Icelandic descent. He was educated in the municipality of Leslie and the small town of Foam Lake. He served in the Royal Canadian Air Force during World War II. He received his pilot’s wings in 1944. In April of that year, his service took him to India where he was posted with the RAF #354 Squadron flying B24 Liberators along the Burma Coast. Bryan was also a member of the Goldfish club. He met the love of his life, Evelyn, in April 1947 and married her 3 months later, they enjoyed 66 years together – 50 of which they lived in Foam Lake. She predeceased him in January 2013. Bryan lived the majority of his life in Leslie and Foam Lake .

Bjarnason died on September 8, 2022 at the house of his son and daughter in-law, Arni and DeeDee Bjarnason at the age of 98.
