= James Benjamin Hooker =

Canadian politician (1910–1984)

James Benjamin Hooker (May 1910 – September 6, 1984) was a farmer and political figure in Saskatchewan. He represented Notukeu-Willow Bunch from 1964 to 1971 in the Legislative Assembly of Saskatchewan as a Liberal.

He was born in Lafleche, Saskatchewan, the son of George W. Hooker, and was educated in Woodrow and in Regina. In 1937, Hooker married Joan Whitby. He farmed in the Lafleche area for 35 years. Hooker was a member of the town council for Lafleche, also serving as mayor from 1953 to 1962. He was also president of the Saskatchewan Curling Association and chairman of the Lafleche Union Hospital Board, and of the Lafleche Community Recreation Co-operative. Hooker was defeated by Allen Engel when he ran for reelection to the provincial assembly in 1971. He ran unsuccessfully for the Assiniboia seat in the Canadian House of Commons in a 1971 by-election held following the death of Albert B. Douglas.
