= James Snedker =

Canadian politician

James Edward Phipps Snedker MLA

15th Speaker of the Legislative Assembly of Saskatchewan
- In office 1965–1971
- Preceded by: Fred Dewhurst
- Succeeded by: Fred Dewhurst

MLA for Saltcoats
- In office 1960–1971
- Preceded by: Asmundur Loptson
- Succeeded by: Ed Kaeding

Personal details
- Born: March 11, 1911 Northamptonshire, England
- Died: March 31, 1981 (aged 70)
- Party: Liberal
- Occupation: school board trustee, farmer, equestrian judge

James Edward Phipps Snedker (March 11, 1911 – March 31, 1981) was an English-born farmer, business owner and political figure in Saskatchewan, Canada. He represented Saltcoats in the Legislative Assembly of Saskatchewan from 1960 to 1971 as a Liberal.

He came to Saskatchewan with his family at a young age but returned to England for his education. In the late 1920s, he returned to Saskatchewan and settled on a farm near Saltcoats. Snedker also owned the Saltcoats Seed Company. He was a member of the local school board and of hospital boards in the area. Snedker was also a judge for the Canadian Trotting Association. He served as speaker for the Saskatchewan assembly from 1965 to 1971. Snedker was defeated when he ran for reelection in 1971.
