= Robert Walker (Canadian politician) =

Canadian politician and lawyer

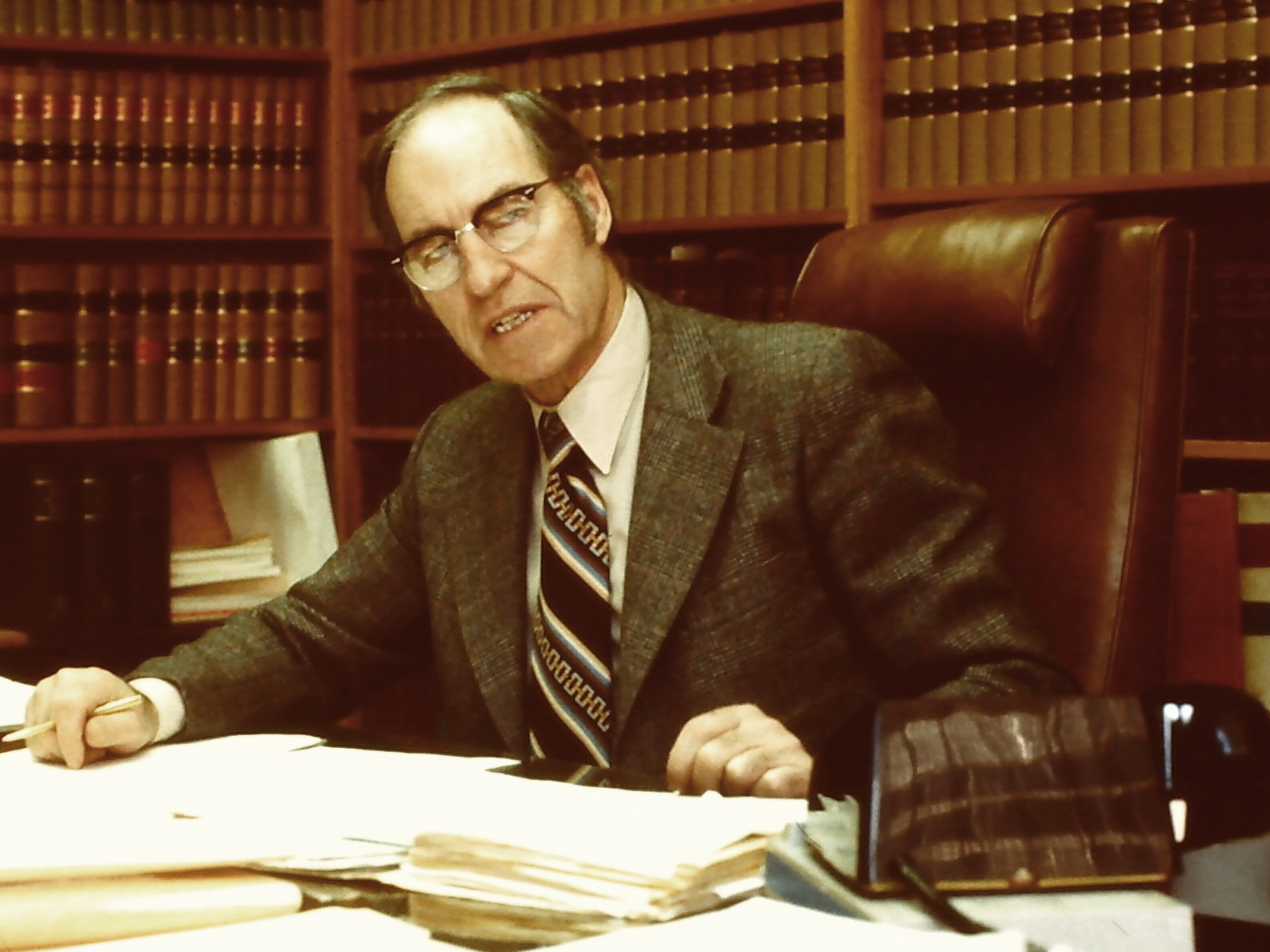

Member of the Legislative Assembly of Saskatchewan
- In office 1948–1967

Personal details
- Born: March 6, 1916
- Died: March 28, 1989 (aged 73)

Robert Alexander Walker, QC (March 6, 1916 – March 28, 1989) was a Canadian lawyer who served in the Legislative Assembly of Saskatchewan from 1948 to 1967.

Walker was born in Regina, Saskatchewan, the son of G.H. Walker and Jean McMillan, and was educated in Mazenod and at the University of Saskatchewan. In 1941, he married Rosa Rebecca Nagel.

First elected to the Saskatchewan assembly as the CCF member for Hanley constituency in the 1948 general election, he went on to re-election in 1952, and 1956. In 1956 he joined the cabinet of Premier Tommy Douglas as Attorney General and Provincial Secretary. He continued in those roles following his re-election in 1960. After Douglas left to lead the federal NDP in 1961, Woodrow Lloyd became premier and the first universal medical care plan in Canada was introduced after the doctor's strike. In the 1964 general election, Walker was narrowly defeated according to the count on election day, but the election was voided He was re-elected in the subsequent by-election in December 1964 and served in the CCF-NDP opposition until he was defeated in the 1967 general election.

After he left the cabinet in 1964, he resumed the practice of law in Saskatoon until 1984 when he retired to Victoria, British Columbia where he died in 1989. He was survived by his wife, Rosa Rebecca Nagel (who died in Victoria in 2005), four children and many grandchildren, including future British Columbia MLA, Adam Walker.
