= Lionel Coderre =

Canadian politician

Lionel Philias Coderre (April 15, 1915 – August 3, 1995) was a merchant, electrician and political figure in Saskatchewan. He represented Gravelbourg from 1956 to 1971 in the Legislative Assembly of Saskatchewan, as a Liberal.

He was born in Coderre, Saskatchewan, the son of Eudore Coderre and Clodia Charbonneau, and was educated in Coderre and at the College Mathieu in Gravelbourg. From 1937 to 1939, Coderre worked at a nurse at the Provincial Hospital in Weyburn. He served in the South Saskatchewan Regiment during World War II, attained the rank of Major and fought in the Dieppe Raid in 1942. He was twice mentioned in dispatches. After the war, Coderre owned and operated the local power plant and a hardware store / electrical contracting business in Coderre. In 1946, he married Pauline Graf, a nurse he met while recuperating from wounds he received during the war. Coderre also served six years on the village council for Coderre. Coderre was elected to the legislature in 1956 and was reelected in 1960, 1964, and 1967. He was Saskatchewan's first French speaking cabinet minister, as he served in Premier Ross Thatcher's two provincial cabinets as Minister of Labour, Minister of Co-operation and Co-operative Development and Minister of Public Works. He was defeated by Reg Gross when he ran for reelection to the provincial assembly in 1971.
