= Donald Gilbert MacLennan =

Canadian politician

Donald Gilbert "Don" MacLennan (August 24, 1936 – December 28, 1990) was a civil servant and political figure in Saskatchewan. He represented Last Mountain from 1964 to 1971 in the Legislative Assembly of Saskatchewan as a Liberal.

He was born in Regina, Saskatchewan and was educated in Lebret, at Campion College and at the University of Saskatchewan. In 1968, MacLennan married Crystal Walker. He ran unsuccessfully for a seat in the provincial assembly in 1960 before being elected in 1964. MacLennan served in the provincial cabinet as Minister of Labour. He had also served as legislative secretary to the Premier. He was defeated by Gordon MacMurchy when he ran for reelection to the Saskatchewan assembly in 1971. After leaving politics, MacLennan was employed with the Unemployment Insurance Commission in Ottawa from 1972 until his death due to cancer at the age of 54.
