= Gordon Snyder =

Canadian politician

Gordon Taylor Snyder (December 17, 1924 – December 10, 2005) was a Canadian provincial politician from Saskatchewan. He served as the Minister of Labour of the Canadian province of Saskatchewan from 1971 to 1982, and a member of the Legislative Assembly of Saskatchewan on behalf of the Saskatchewan New Democratic Party (NDP).

== Early years ==
His formative years, spanning the Great Depression, were divided between his family farm and Moose Jaw where his father worked as a railroad engineer and a respected union leader. Family discussions surrounded Christian responsibility to Snyder and the works of prominent European social thinkers. Snyder considered capitalism to be an unjust economic system and thought that, when left to its own devices, it threw so many into despair and poverty, then quickly flourished when socially unproductive items like tanks, guns and bombs were built. This view that society should serve all its citizens, not just the wealthy and powerful, led Snyder and his parents to become some of the earliest members of the Co-operative Commonwealth Federation, which later became the NDP.

In 1942, Snyder joined the Royal Canadian Air Force, serving Canada until his discharge at the end of World War II in 1945. He then returned home to take up a career as a railroad engineer and operate the family farm and actively participated in community affairs.

== Political career ==
Snyder first sought and won office in the 1960 Saskatchewan general election under the leadership of Premier Tommy Douglas. He was elected at Moose Jaw City, which elected two members under cumulative voting at the time. Snyder came second in Moose Jaw City to his fellow Saskatchewan CCF candidate William G. Davies. In 1962, he was a "proud foot soldier" in the fight that brought universal Medicare to Saskatchewan, and ultimately led to its adoption across Canada.

Subsequent election wins in 1964, 1967, 1971, 1975 and 1978, made Snyder one of Saskatchewan's longest-serving MLAs ever, with a total of 22 years in the legislature. Moose Jaw City was abolished in time for the 1967 provincial election; Snyder ran successfully in Moose Jaw North that year, then transitioned to Moose Jaw South (now Moose Jaw Wakamow) in 1971, which he represented for the remainder of his provincial service.

During the premiership of Allan Blakeney (1971–1982), Snyder served on the Executive Council of Saskatchewan as Minister of Labour. Snyder was the only labour minister for the entire duration of the Blakeney government, from 1971 to 1982.

As a cabinet minister, his favourite legislative accomplishment was the development of a Canadian first, the Occupational Health and Safety Act, which, since its implementation, has served to protect the lives and health of a great many people from workplace related accidents and illness. Another Canadian first, the introduction of the forty-hour work week, was also made during his tenure as head of the Department of Labour. Snyder also undertook a comprehensive reform of workers' compensation in Saskatchewan, changing it from a system that saw the government pay out lump sums for permanent injuries to one that was based on income replacement with the focus on rehabilitation.

Although the Progressive Conservative Party of Canada had been Saskatchewan's dominant party in federal elections since the time the province's adopted son John Diefenbaker was Prime Minister of Canada, the Saskatchewan Progressive Conservatives did not enjoy similar success during the same time. In the 1982 Saskatchewan general election, however, the PCs under Grant Devine won a landslide victory. After losing his seat to PC candidate Bud Smith in 1982, Snyder never returned to politics.
