= Bernard David Gallagher =

Canadian politician

Bernard David Gallagher (July 22, 1925 – October 1, 2003) was a farmer and political figure in Saskatchewan, Canada. He represented Yorkton from 1960 to 1971 in the Legislative Assembly of Saskatchewan as a Liberal.

He was born in Yorkton, Saskatchewan, the son of Fergal Gallagher and Alberta O'Toole, both of Irish descent, and was educated in Yorkton. In 1949, he married Dorothy Jean Lang.
