= Thomas Milton Weatherald =

Canadian farmer and politician (1937–2019)

Thomas Milton Weatherald (August 14, 1937 – July 23, 2019) was a farmer and political figure in Saskatchewan. He represented Cannington from 1964 to 1975 in the Legislative Assembly of Saskatchewan as a Liberal.

He was born in Wawota, Saskatchewan. He is the son of Lyle V. Weatherald and Mary Ann Milton, and was educated there and at the University of Saskatchewan. In 1969, Weatherald married Cheryl Marjorie Jopling. He lived in Wawota. Weatherald was defeated by Eric Berntson when he ran for re-election in the newly formed riding of Souris-Cannington. In 2007, he was inducted into the Saskatchewan Baseball Hall of Fame. He died on July 23, 2019, in Regina, Saskatchewan.
