= Kelsey (Saskatchewan provincial electoral district) =

Former provincial electoral district in Saskatchewan, Canada

Coordinates: 53.115°N 103.028°W

Kelsey was a provincial electoral district for the Legislative Assembly of the province of Saskatchewan, Canada, encompassing the towns of Hudson Bay and Carrot River. The district was named after 17th century explorer Henry Kelsey.

Created before the 12th Saskatchewan general election in 1952, this riding was combined with part of the Melfort-Tisdale district (as "Tisdale-Kelsey") before the 17th Saskatchewan general election in 1971. It is now part of the constituency of Carrot River Valley.

== Members of the Legislative Assembly ==
#	MLA	Served	Party
1.	John Hewgill Brockelbank	1952 – 1967	CCF
2.	John Rissler Messer	1967 – 1971	New Democrat

== Election results ==
1952 Saskatchewan general election: Kelsey electoral district
Party	Candidate	Votes	%	±%
CCF	John Hewgill Brockelbank	4,188	53.44%	–
Liberal	Donald L.W. Hood	3,109	39.67%	–
Social Credit	E. Pugh	540	6.89%	–
Total		7,837	100.00%	

1956 Saskatchewan general election: Kelsey electoral district
Party	Candidate	Votes	%	±%
CCF	John Hewgill Brockelbank	3,189	44.41%	-9.03
Social Credit	Robert S. Claypool	2,125	29.59%	+22.70
Liberal	Donald Wheaton	1,867	26.00%	-13.67
Total		7,181	100.00%	

1960 Saskatchewan general election: Kelsey electoral district
Party	Candidate	Votes	%	±%
CCF	John Hewgill Brockelbank	2,736	41.19%	-3.22
Liberal	Lawrence Wassill	1,542	23.21%	-2.79
Social Credit	Elmer Boschman	1,487	22.38%	-7.21
Prog. Conservative	Allan Oliver Anderson	878	13.22%	–
Total		6,643	100.00%	

1964 Saskatchewan general election: Kelsey electoral district
Party	Candidate	Votes	%	±%
CCF	John Hewgill Brockelbank	2,561	39.00%	-2.19
Liberal	William John McHugh	2,518	38.34%	+15.13
Prog. Conservative	Carsten Johnson	1,488	22.66%	+9.44
Total		6,567	100.00%	

1967 Saskatchewan general election: Kelsey electoral district
Party	Candidate	Votes	%	±%
NDP	John Rissler Messer	2,473	45.29%	+6.29
Liberal	William John McHugh	2,381	43.61%	+5.27
Prog. Conservative	Carsten Johnson	606	11.10%	-11.56
Total		5,460	100.00%	

== See also ==
- List of Saskatchewan provincial electoral districts
- List of Saskatchewan general elections
- Canadian provincial electoral districts
