= Cyril Pius MacDonald =

Canadian politician

Cyril Pius "Cy" MacDonald (February 29, 1928 – November 14, 2015) was an educator and political figure in Saskatchewan. He represented Milestone from 1964 to 1975 and Qu'Appelle-Wolseley from 1975 to 1978 in the Legislative Assembly of Saskatchewan as a Liberal.

He was born in Humboldt, Saskatchewan and educated in Saskatoon, at Notre Dame College in Wilcox and at St. Francis Xavier University, where he received a BEd degree.

In 1951, he married Ann Sullivan. MacDonald taught school in Yorkton and in Wilcox. He ran unsuccessfully for a seat in the Saskatchewan assembly in 1960 before being elected in 1964. MacDonald served in the provincial cabinet as Minister of Industry and Commerce and as Minister of Welfare.

MacDonald ran for the leadership of the Saskatchewan Liberal Party in 1971. He died in Vancouver, British Columbia on November 14, 2015, at the age of 87.
