= Notukeu-Willow Bunch =

Former provincial electoral district in Saskatchewan, Canada

Coordinates: 49°25′N 106°20′W

Notukeu-Willow Bunch was a provincial electoral division for the Legislative Assembly of the province of Saskatchewan, Canada, located south of Old Wives Lake. Centred on the town of Assiniboia, this constituency was created for the 8th Saskatchewan general election in 1938 by combining the districts of Notukeu and Willow Bunch.

The constituency was dissolved and divided between the districts of Assiniboia-Gravelbourg and Bengough-Milestone before the 18th Saskatchewan general election in 1975. It is now part of the ridings of Wood River and Weyburn-Big Muddy.

== Members of the Legislative Assembly ==
#	MLA	Served	Party
1.	Charles William Johnson	1938–1944	Liberal
2.	Niles Buchanan	1944–1956	CCF
3.	Karl Klein	1956–1964	Liberal
4.	Jim Hooker	1964–1971	Liberal
5.	Allen Engel	1971–1975	New Democrat

== Election results ==
1938 Saskatchewan general election: Notukeu-Willow Bunch
Party	Candidate	Votes	%	±%
Liberal	Charles William Johnson	3,659	48.03%	–
CCF	John E. Lidgett	2,859	37.53%	–
Social Credit	George W.S. Eisnor	1,100	14.44%	–
Total		7,618	100.00%	

1944 Saskatchewan general election: Notukeu-Willow Bunch
Party	Candidate	Votes	%	±%
CCF	Niles Buchanan	4,176	59.33%	+21.80
Liberal	Charles William Johnson	2,862	40.67%	-7.36
Total		7,038	100.00%	

1948 Saskatchewan general election: Notukeu-Willow Bunch
Party	Candidate	Votes	%	±%
CCF	Niles Buchanan	4,048	53.75%	-5.58
Liberal	Hans Loken	3,483	46.25%	+5.58
Total		7,531	100.00%	

1952 Saskatchewan general election: Notukeu-Willow Bunch
Party	Candidate	Votes	%	±%
CCF	Niles Buchanan	3,663	52.31%	-1.44
Liberal	James Lindsay	3,339	47.69%	+1.44
Total		7,002	100.00%	

1956 Saskatchewan general election: Notukeu-Willow Bunch
Party	Candidate	Votes	%	±%
Liberal	Karl Klein	2,631	40.42%	-7.27
CCF	Emil Lautermilch	2,580	39.63%	-12.68
Social Credit	Gordon W. McIvor	1,299	19.95%	-
Total		6,510	100.00%	

1960 Saskatchewan general election: Notukeu-Willow Bunch
Party	Candidate	Votes	%	±%
Liberal	Karl Klein	2,396	38.92%	-1.50
CCF	Albin Frid	2,278	37.00%	-2.63
Prog. Conservative	Boyd M. Anderson	895	14.54%	–
Social Credit	Gordon W. McIvor	552	8.97%	-10.98
Communist	Norah Jarbeau	35	0.57%	–
Total		6,156	100.00%	

1964 Saskatchewan general election: Notukeu-Willow Bunch
Party	Candidate	Votes	%	±%
Liberal	Jim Hooker	2,660	45.87%	+6.95
CCF	Hasket M. Sproule	2,193	37.82%	+0.82
Prog. Conservative	Boyd M. Anderson	946	16.31%	+1.77
Total		5,799	100.00%	

1967 Saskatchewan general election: Notukeu-Willow Bunch
Party	Candidate	Votes	%	±%
Liberal	Jim Hooker	2,772	55.57%	+9.70
NDP	Allen Engel	2,216	44.43%	+6.61
Total		4,988	100.00%	

1971 Saskatchewan general election: Notukeu-Willow Bunch
Party	Candidate	Votes	%	±%
NDP	Allen Engel	2,542	51.90%	+7.47
Liberal	Jim Hooker	2,356	48.10%	-7.47
Total		4,898	100.00%	

== See also ==
- List of Saskatchewan provincial electoral districts
- List of Saskatchewan general elections
- Canadian provincial electoral districts
- Willow Bunch, Saskatchewan
