= James Auburn Pepper =

Canadian politician and farmer

James Auburn Pepper (August 9, 1915 – December 5, 1985) was a farmer and political figure in Saskatchewan. He represented Weyburn from 1964 to 1982 in the Legislative Assembly of Saskatchewan as a Co-operative Commonwealth Federation (CCF) and then New Democratic Party (NDP) member.

He was born in Goodwater, Saskatchewan, was educated there and worked on the family farm until 1963, when he moved to Weyburn. Pepper was an active member of the Lomond Rural Municipal Council for twelve years, and also a member of the Goodwater Centralized School Board for a number of years. Pepper was a member of the Saskatchewan Wheat Pool.

== Personal life ==
Pepper married Jean Thackeray in 1940 and had four children.
