= David Boldt =

Canadian politician

David Boldt (January 21, 1918 – December 31, 2007) was a farmer and political figure in Saskatchewan. He represented Rosthern from 1960 to 1975 in the Legislative Assembly of Saskatchewan as a Liberal.

He was born in Osler, Saskatchewan, the son of Jacob B. Boldt, a native of the Netherlands, and was educated there, going on to complete a degree in Agriculture at the University of Saskatchewan. Boldt received further training at the Edmonton Welding School. In 1945, he married Anne Enns. Boldt served in the provincial cabinet as Minister of Social Welfare and Rehabilitation, as Minister of Welfare and as Minister of Highways and Transportation.
