= Bengough (electoral district) =

Former provincial electoral district in Saskatchewan, Canada

Coordinates: 49°24′N 105°07′W

Bengough was a provincial electoral district for the Legislative Assembly of Saskatchewan, Canada. This constituency was created the 1917 Saskatchewan general election. It was redistributed before the 1971 Saskatchewan general election.

== Member of the Legislative Assembly ==
#	MLA	Served	Party
1.	Thomas Evan Gamble	1917 - 1929	Liberal
2.	Herman Kersler Warren	1929 - 1934	Conservative
3.	James Bidwell Smith	1934 - 1938	Liberal
4.	Herman Kersler Warren	1938 - 1944	Unity
5.	Allan Lister Samuel Brown	1944 - 1960	CCF
6.	Hjalmar Reinhold Dahlman	1960 - 1964	CCF
7.	Samuel Karnarvon Asbell	1964 - 1966	Liberal
8.	Alexander Mitchell	1966 - 1971	Liberal

== Election results ==
Saskatchewan General Election 1917: Bengough
Party	Candidate	Votes	%	±%
Liberal	Thomas Evan Gamble	2,004	64.12	-
Conservative	William Wallace Davidson	1,121	35.87	-
Total		3,125	100.00	

Saskatchewan General Election 1921: Bengough
Party	Candidate	Votes	%	±%
Liberal	Thomas Evan Gamble	1,813	70.40	+6.27
Independent	Edgar Alfred Devlin	762	29.59	-
Total		2,575	100.00	

Saskatchewan General Election 1925: Bengough
Party	Candidate	Votes	%	±%
Liberal	Thomas Evan Gamble	1,813	61.64	-8.76
Progressive	Charles R. Totton	1,128	38.35	-
Total		2,941	100.00	

Saskatchewan General Election 1929: Bengough
Party	Candidate	Votes	%	±%
Conservative	Herman Kersler Warren	2,090	44.79	+44.79
Liberal	Thomas Evan Gamble	1,750	37.50	-24.14
Progressive	Charles Edward Little	826	17.70	-20.65
Total		4,666	100.00	

Saskatchewan General Election 1934: Bengough
Party	Candidate	Votes	%	±%
Liberal	James Bidwell Smith	2,122	39.07	+1.56
Conservative	Herman Kersler Warren	2,052	37.78	-7.00
Farmer-Labour	William Francis Jordan	1,257	23.14	+23.14
Total		5,431	100.00	

Saskatchewan General Election 1938: Bengough
Party	Candidate	Votes	%	±%
Unity	Herman Kersler Warren	3,331	51.33	-
Liberal	James Bidwell Smith	3,158	48.66	+9.59
Total		6,489	100.00	

Saskatchewan General Election 1944: Bengough
Party	Candidate	Votes	%	±%
CCF	Allan Lister Samuel Brown	3,847	60.87	-
Liberal	Thomas Waddell	2,473	39.12	-9.53
Total		6,320	100.00	

Saskatchewan General Election 1948: Bengough
Party	Candidate	Votes	%	±%
CCF	Allan Lister Samuel Brown	3,599	51.92	-8.94
Liberal	Archibald Victor Wightman	2,627	37.90	-1.22
Social Credit	Arnold L. Meginbir	705	10.17	-
Total		6,931	100.00	

Saskatchewan General Election 1952: Bengough
Party	Candidate	Votes	%	±%
CCF	Allan Lister Samuel Brown	3,757	58.05	+6.12
Liberal	William John Dalgarno	2,715	41.94	+4.04
Total		6,472	100.00	

Saskatchewan General Election 1956: Bengough
Party	Candidate	Votes	%	±%
CCF	Allan Lister Samuel Brown	2,685	41.86	-16.18
Liberal	Samuel Karnarvon Asbell	2,364	36.86	-5.08
Social Credit	Roy Hardeman Bailey	1,364	21.26	-
Total		6,413	100.00	

Saskatchewan General Election 1960: Bengough
Party	Candidate	Votes	%	±%
CCF	Hjalmar Reinhold Dahlman	2,541	41.17	-0.69
Liberal	Samuel Karnarvon Asbell	2,486	40.28	+3.42
PC	Harold Bateson	707	11.45	-
Social Credit	Roy Hardeman Bailey	437	7.08	-14.18
Total		6,171	100.00	

Saskatchewan General Election 1964: Bengough
Party	Candidate	Votes	%	±%
Liberal	Samuel Karnarvon Asbell	2,613	42.72	+2.43
CCF	Hjalmar Reinhold Dahlman	2,311	37.78	-3.39
PC	Roy Hardeman Bailey	1,192	19.48	+8.03
Total		6116	100.00	

February 16, 1966 By-election: Bengough
Party	Candidate	Votes	%	±%
Liberal	Alexander Mitchell	2,423	42.74	+0.01
CCF	Hjalmar Reinhold Dahlman	2,285	40.30	+2.52
PC	George W. Spicer	961	16.95	-2.53
Total		5,669	100.00	

Saskatchewan General Election 1967: Bengough
Party	Candidate	Votes	%	±%
Liberal	Alexander Mitchell	2,408	45.22	+2.47
New Democratic	Dale Leifso	2,194	41.20	-
Prog. Conservative	Jim Hall	723	13.57	-3.37
Total		5,325	100.00	

== See also ==
- List of Saskatchewan provincial electoral districts
- List of Saskatchewan general elections
- Canadian provincial electoral districts
