= Demitro Michayluk =

Canadian politician and educator

Demitro Wasyl "Dick" Michayluk (December 23, 1911 – January 2, 1990) was an educator and political figure in Saskatchewan. He represented Redberry from 1960 to 1975 in the Legislative Assembly of Saskatchewan as a Co-operative Commonwealth Federation (CCF) and then New Democratic Party (NDP) member.

He was born in Blaine Lake, Saskatchewan, the son of Wasyl Michayluk and Dora Boytzun, both immigrants from western Ukraine, and grew up on the nearby family farm. Michayluk was educated in Krydor and at the Moose Jaw Normal School. He taught school for 37 years, mainly in the Blaine Lake area. In 1940, Michayluk married Mary Solodiuk. He was president of the Krydor Board of Trade and also served on the council for the village of Krydor. Michayluk retired to Saskatoon, later dying there at the age of 78.
