= Clarence George Willis =

Canadian politician, educator, and farmer

Clarence George Willis (November 11, 1907 – February 14, 1984) was an educator, farmer and political figure in Saskatchewan. He represented Melfort-Tisdale from 1952 to 1970 in the Legislative Assembly of Saskatchewan as a Co-operative Commonwealth Federation (CCF) and then New Democratic Party (NDP) member.

He was born in Dauphin, Manitoba, the son of John Henry Willis and Elizabeth Rebecca Herd, and came to Saskatchewan while he was attending high school. Willis continued his education at Nutana College in Saskatoon and then at the University of Saskatchewan. He left the university after one year and then earned a teaching certificate from the Saskatoon Normal School. Willis taught school from 1931 to 1944. He was rejected from serving in the military for health reasons and began farming. Willis served as a trustee for the Melfort Larger School Unit from 1945 to 1951 and was president of the Melfort Agricultural Society from 1948 to 1951. He was a member of the provincial cabinet, serving as Minister of Public Works and then as Minister of Highways and Transportation. Willis resigned his seat in the provincial assembly in 1970 for health reasons. He retired to British Columbia, dying there at the age of 76.
