= Isidore Charles Nollet =

Canadian politician

Isidore Charles "Toby" Nollet (November 18, 1898 – April 29, 1988) was an American-born rancher and political figure in Saskatchewan. He represented Cut Knife from 1944 to 1964 and Cut Knife-Lloydminster from 1964 to 1967 in the Legislative Assembly of Saskatchewan as a Co-operative Commonwealth Federation (CCF) member.

== Biography ==
He was born in Sentinel Butte, North Dakota and was educated at Saint Benedict's Academy and Saint Thomas Military College in Minnesota. Nollet served overseas with the American Expeditionary Force during World War I. After the war, with his father, he moved to Freemont, Saskatchewan, where he established a ranch that raised Aberdeen Angus cattle. Nollet served as reeve of the rural municipality of Hillsdale. He was a member of the United Farmers of Canada and of the Saskatchewan Wheat Pool. In 1933, he married Patricia "Peggy" Chicilo. Nollet served as deputy speaker for the provincial assembly and then was a member of the provincial cabinet, serving as Minister of Agriculture from 1946 to 1964. He helped develop the South Saskatchewan River Project. Nollet retired from politics in 1967. In 1975, he was inducted into the Saskatchewan Agricultural Hall of Fame. He died in Kelowna, British Columbia at the age of 89.

The Toby Nollet Bridge over the North Saskatchewan River was named in his honour.
