= Everett Irvine Wood =

Canadian politician

Everett Irvine Wood (October 4, 1910 – March 20, 1983) was a farmer and political figure in Saskatchewan, Canada. He represented Swift Current in the Legislative Assembly of Saskatchewan from 1956 to 1975 as a CCF/NDP member.

He was born on a farm near Swift Current, Saskatchewan, the son of William B. Wood and Bertha Yeomans. He was educated there and at the Canadian Pentecostal Bible College in Winnipeg. Wood served on the council for the rural municipality of Saskatchewan Landing from 1947 to 1950 and was reeve from 1952 to 1956. He served as speaker for the Saskatchewan assembly in 1961. Wood was a member of the Saskatchewan cabinet, serving as Minister of Municipal Affairs from 1961 to 1964, as Minister of Public Works from 1971 to 1972 and as Minister of Municipal Affairs from 1971 to 1975. He retired from politics for health reasons in 1975.

In 1955, he married Madelaine McLeod.
