= William Gwynne Davies =

Canadian politician

William Gwynne Davies (February 11, 1916 – November 9, 1999) was a trade unionist and political figure in Saskatchewan. He represented Moose Jaw City from 1956 to 1967 as a Co-operative Commonwealth Federation (CCF) member and Moose Jaw Wakamow from 1967 to 1971 as a New Democratic Party (NDP) member in the Legislative Assembly of Saskatchewan.

He was born in Indian Head, Saskatchewan and moved to Regina with his family at the age of 7. Davies worked as an office boy at the Regina Daily Star. He was present at the Regina Riot of 1935, where he was tear gased by police. During the 1940s, he worked at the Swift Canadian slaughterhouse in Moose Jaw and helped organize the plant for the United Packinghouse Workers of America. He served on the Federal Wartime Labour Relations Board and the Saskatchewan Labour Relations Board. Davies was executive secretary for the Saskatchewan Federation of Labour for 25 years. From 1948 to 1956, he was a member of Moose Jaw City Council. Davies served in the provincial cabinet as Minister of Public Works and as Minister of Public Health. Medicare was introduced in Saskatchewan while he held the Public Health portfolio.

Davies published a book of poetry called The Buffalo Stone. He also researched and wrote a history of the Saskatchewan trade union movement in partnership with Murray Cotterill.

In 1975, he was named a member in the Order of Canada.
