= Gravelbourg (electoral district) =

Former provincial electoral district in Saskatchewan, Canada

Coordinates: 49°30′N 106°40′W

Gravelbourg is a former provincial electoral district for the Legislative Assembly of the province of Saskatchewan, Canada. This district was created before the 5th Saskatchewan general election in 1921. Redrawn and renamed "Assiniboia-Gravelbourg" in 1975, the riding was dissolved before the 23rd Saskatchewan general election in 1995.

It is now part of the Wood River constituency.

== Members of the Legislative Assembly ==
=== Gravelbourg (1921–1975) ===
#	MLA	Served	Party
1.	William James Cummings	1921–1925	Independent
2.	Benjamin Franklin McGregor	1925–1935	Liberal
3.	Edward M. Culliton	Nov. 26, 1935–1944	Liberal
4.	Henry E. Houze	1944–1948	CCF
5.	Edward M. Culliton	1948–1951	Liberal
6.	Edward H. Walker	July 10, 1951 – 1956	CCF
7.	Lionel Coderre	1956–1971	Liberal
8.	Reg Gross	1971–1975	New Democrat

=== Assiniboia-Gravelbourg (1975–1995) ===
#	MLA	Served	Party
1.	Roy Nelson	1975–1978	Liberal
2.	Al Engel	1978– 1986	New Democrat
3.	Ralph Goodale	1986–1988	Liberal
4.	John Wolfe	Dec. 15, 1988–1991	Progressive Conservative
5.	Lewis Draper	1991–1995	New Democrat

== Election results ==
1921 Saskatchewan general election: Gravelbourg electoral district
Party	Candidate	Votes	%	±%
Independent	William James Cummings	2,582	52.77%	–
Liberal	Emile Gravel	2,311	47.23%	–
Total		4,893	100.00%	

1925 Saskatchewan general election: Gravelbourg electoral district
Party	Candidate	Votes	%	±%
Liberal	Benjamin Franklin McGregor	2,832	74.59%	+21.82
Progressive	William Kilshaw	965	25.41%	–
Total		3,797	100.00%	

1929 Saskatchewan general election: Gravelbourg electoral district
Party	Candidate	Votes	%	±%
Liberal	Benjamin Franklin McGregor	3,483	59.30%	-15.29
Conservative	George William Stuart Eisnor	2,391	40.70%	–
Total		5,874	100.00%	

1934 Saskatchewan general election: Gravelbourg electoral district
Party	Candidate	Votes	%	±%
Liberal	Benjamin Franklin McGregor	3,177	53.99%	-5.31
Conservative	Henry J. Coutu	1,642	27.91%	-12.79
Farmer-Labour	Richard Pennington Sinkinson	1,065	18.10%	–
Total		5,884	100.00%	

November 26, 1935 By-Election: Gravelbourg electoral district
Party	Candidate	Votes	%	±%
Liberal	Edward M. Culliton	3,312	68.90%	+14.91
CCF	Frank Keem Malcolm	1,495	31.10%	+13.00
Total		4,807	100.00%	

1938 Saskatchewan general election: Gravelbourg electoral district
Party	Candidate	Votes	%	±%
Liberal	Edward M. Culliton	3,683	62.58%	-6.32
Social Credit	Andrew J. Miller	2,202	37.42%	–
Total		5,885	100.00%	

1944 Saskatchewan general election: Gravelbourg electoral district
Party	Candidate	Votes	%	±%
CCF	Henry E. Houze	2,681	50.90%	-
Liberal	Edward M. Culliton	2,586	49.10%	-13.48
Total		5,267	100.00%	

1948 Saskatchewan general election: Gravelbourg electoral district
Party	Candidate	Votes	%	±%
Liberal	Edward M. Culliton	2,935	50.05%	+0.95
CCF	Henry E. Houze	2,525	43.06%	-7.84
Social Credit	Milton A. "Art" Wilson	404	6.89%	-
Total		5,864	100.00%	

July 10, 1951 By-Election: Gravelbourg electoral district
Party	Candidate	Votes	%	±%
CCF	Edward H. Walker	2,571	50.76%	+7.70
Liberal	Ronald A. MacLean	2,494	49.24%	-0.81
Total		5,065	100.00%	

1952 Saskatchewan general election: Gravelbourg electoral district
Party	Candidate	Votes	%	±%
CCF	Edward H. Walker	2,861	47.16%	-3.60
Liberal	Ronald A. MacLean	2,802	46.18%	-3.06
Social Credit	Arnold L. Meginbir	404	6.66%	-
Total		6,067	100.00%	

1956 Saskatchewan general election: Gravelbourg electoral district
Party	Candidate	Votes	%	±%
Liberal	Lionel Coderre	2,503	43.45%	-2.73
CCF	Edward H. Walker	2,309	40.09%	-7.07
Social Credit	Raymond Hoshowsky	948	16.46%	+9.80
Total		5,760	100.00%	

1960 Saskatchewan general election: Gravelbourg electoral district
Party	Candidate	Votes	%	±%
Liberal	Lionel Coderre	2,708	44.42%	+0.97
CCF	Thomas Donahue	2,188	35.89%	-4.20
Social Credit	Ewald W. Schmidt	771	12.65%	-3.81
Prog. Conservative	Charles J. T. James	429	7.04%	-
Total		6,096	100.00%	

1964 Saskatchewan general election: Gravelbourg electoral district
Party	Candidate	Votes	%	±%
Liberal	Lionel Coderre	2,999	55.06%	+10.64
CCF	Roland LeBlanc	2,448	44.94%	+9.05
Total		5,447	100.00%	

1967 Saskatchewan general election: Gravelbourg electoral district
Party	Candidate	Votes	%	±%
Liberal	Lionel Coderre	2,385	49.57%	-5.49
NDP	Norman Allan	1,860	38.65%	-6.29
Prog. Conservative	Keith Muckelt	567	11.78%	-
Total		4,812	100.00%	

1971 Saskatchewan general election: Gravelbourg electoral district
Party	Candidate	Votes	%	±%
NDP	Reg Gross	2,399	50.46%	+11.81
Liberal	Lionel Coderre	2,355	49.54%	-0.03
Total		4,754	100.00%	

== See also ==
- List of Saskatchewan provincial electoral districts
- List of Saskatchewan general elections
- Canadian provincial electoral districts
