= Eiling Kramer =

Canadian politician

MLA for The Battlefords
- In office 1952–1980

Personal details
- Born: July 14, 1914 North Battleford, Saskatchewan, Canada
- Died: May 5, 1999 (aged 84) Regina, Saskatchewan
- Party: CCF/NDP
- Spouse: Dorothy Johnston

Eiling Kramer (July 14, 1914 – May 5, 1999) MLA, was an auctioneer, rancher and political figure in Saskatchewan, Canada.

Eiling Kramer was born in 1914, the son of Minne Dowe Kramer and Jacobina Kopinga, in Highworth, Saskatchewan in the North Battleford district. After attending school in Highworth, Eiling worked at a number of jobs, then purchased a ranch where he raised cattle. In 1944, he married Dorothy Johnston. He established an auctioneering business in 1949. In 1950, he helped form the Saskatchewan Farmers' Union and served two years as its vice-president.

He is remembered as one of the most charming and colourful characters to grace Saskatchewan's political scene. Kramer was the longest-serving member in the history of Saskatchewan's Legislative Assembly. First elected in 1952 as the member of the Legislative Assembly (MLA) for The Battlefords, Eiling won re-election in every campaign he contested. He served as a Cabinet minister in the New Democratic Party of Saskatchewan governments under Woodrow Lloyd and Allan Blakeney, managing portfolios that included the departments of Natural Resources, Co-operation and Co-operatives, and Highways and Transportation. He was involved with the Saskatchewan Wheat Pool, the Sherwood Co-op Association and the Lions and Cosmopolitan Clubs.

Eiling retired from politics in 1980, moving to North Battleford and later Regina, where he died at the age of 84 in 1999.
