= Woodrow Lloyd =

8th Premier of Saskatchewan (1961–1964)

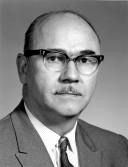

8th Premier of Saskatchewan
- In office November 7, 1961 – May 22, 1964
- Monarch: Elizabeth II
- Lieutenant Governor: Frank Lindsay Bastedo; Robert Hanbidge
- Preceded by: Tommy Douglas
- Succeeded by: Ross Thatcher

Member of the Legislative Assembly
- In office June 15, 1944 – June 23, 1971
- Preceded by: John Allan Young (CCF)
- Succeeded by: Elwood Cowley (NDP)
- Constituency: Biggar

Leader of the Opposition (Saskatchewan)
- In office May 22, 1964 – July 4, 1970
- Preceded by: Ross Thatcher
- Succeeded by: Allan Blakeney

Personal details
- Born: Woodrow Stanley Lloyd; July 16, 1913 Webb, Saskatchewan
- Died: April 7, 1972 (aged 58) Seoul, South Korea
- Party: CCF-NDP
- Spouse: Vicki Lloyd

Woodrow Stanley Lloyd (July 16, 1913 – April 7, 1972) was a Canadian politician and educator who served as the 8th premier of Saskatchewan from 1961 to 1964. Born in Saskatchewan in 1913, he became a teacher in the early 1930s. He worked as a teacher and school principal and was involved with the Saskatchewan Teachers' Federation, eventually becoming its president.

He was first elected as a Member of the Legislative Assembly of Saskatchewan in 1944. He became an instrumental figure in Tommy Douglas's Co-operative Commonwealth Federation government between 1944 and 1961, serving as Education Minister and then Treasurer. He succeeded Douglas as Saskatchewan Premier in late 1961. In that role, Lloyd piloted Canada's first Medicare program from legislation to implementation, including resolving the 1962 Saskatchewan doctors' strike.

Lloyd's government was defeated in the 1964 provincial election and he served the next six years as the Leader of the Official Opposition. He stepped down as party leader in 1970, and from the Legislature in 1971. Lloyd was appointed to a United Nations post in South Korea, where he died of a heart attack in 1972.

== Early life and career ==
Lloyd was born in Webb, Saskatchewan on July 16, 1913. He initially studied engineering, but after the onset of the Great Depression, switched his studies to teaching and graduated with a teaching degree from the University of Saskatchewan in 1936. He started teaching school that year, and eventually became a school principal in the early 1940s at Stewart Valley, Vanguard, and Biggar. Lloyd was also active in the Saskatchewan Teachers' Federation and held many positions in the organization including the presidency from 1940 to 1944. He also served on the University of Saskatchewan's Senate, and was the president of the Saskatchewan Educational Conference in the early 1940s.

== Political career ==
=== Douglas government (1944–61) ===
In the 1944 provincial election, Lloyd was elected to the Saskatchewan Legislature as the Co-operative Commonwealth Federation (CCF) member for the constituency of Biggar, a seat that he went on to hold until his retirement in 1971. The 1944 election brought the CCF to power for the first time with the party promising to invest in social security and economic development. Lloyd became the youngest cabinet minister in Saskatchewan history when he was appointed Minister of Education by Premier Tommy Douglas. Lloyd served in that role for the next sixteen years and oversaw the complete overhaul of the Saskatchewan education system. The most controversial measure he introduced was the amalgamation of thousands of local school boards into 56 larger school units in 1944–45. The measure was instituted to create more equitable educational opportunities for students across the province by providing students greater opportunity to receive instruction by specialized teachers and access to increased education resources, including provincial grants. However, the move was opposed by some rural residents who resented the loss of local control over schools, as the move to larger units resulted in the closure of nearly all rural one-room schools over the next two decades. The transformation has been called "the most revolutionary revision to the province's education system since the creation of the province", and it helped lead to increased school attendance across all age groups. In addition to school reform, Lloyd led the implementation of a regional library system for the province.

After the 1960 election—which resulted in the fifth consecutive CCF majority government—Douglas appointed Lloyd to be the provincial treasurer. The 1960 election was largely seen as a referendum on public healthcare, which the CCF had promised to implement. After the CCF victory, In 1961, Douglas resigned as premier to assume the leadership of the newly-formed federal New Democratic Party (NDP). Lloyd was elected as Douglas' successor for what was now called the Saskatchewan CCF-NDP, defeating Olaf Turnbull. This made Lloyd the first premier of Saskatchewan to have been born in the province after its accession to Confederation in 1905.

=== Premier of Saskatchewan (1961–64) ===
As Premier, Lloyd was responsible for implementing the universal health care plan that had been introduced under Douglas. Lloyd's biggest obstacle was the July 1962 Saskatchewan doctors' strike, when the province's physicians withdrew service in an attempt to defeat the Medicare initiative. Lloyd and his government refused to back down on the concept of a universal public health care system and persuaded the doctors to settle after 23 days. After updated legislation was passed, Maclean's named Lloyd an "outstanding citizen".

In 1963, Lloyd's government created the Saskatchewan Economic Development Corporation to partner with private industry in research and development.

Although Medicare was successfully implemented—and would be implemented across the country in the years that followed—the political turmoil did lasting damage to the CCF government, which by 1964 and had been in power for twenty years. Ross Thatcher's Liberal Party took advantage of a mood for change and worked to limit competition between free-enterprise candidates in the 1964 provincial election; although the popular vote was a virtual tie between Lloyd's party and Thatcher's Liberals, the Liberals won a narrow majority government, which was only confirmed after a number of recounts in close ridings.

=== Late political career (1964–71) ===
After the 1964 election, Lloyd became leader of the Opposition. In that role he sought to renew grassroots engagement and party policy, which he felt had begun to stagnate after the long period in power. In 1967, the party fully adopted the NDP name. Thatcher also called a snap election that year; although Lloyd's party increased its share of the vote, the Liberals secured a second majority, increasing Lloyd's sense of urgency to update the party platform. When the "Waffle" movement—a faction of New Left supporters seeking to return the NDP to its socialist roots and advocating against American imperialism—began making inroads into the NDP at both the federal and provincial level in the late 1960s, it found a supporter in Lloyd, who saw its potential to increase engagement and propose innovative policy. Lloyd voted in support of the movement's Manifesto for an Independent Socialist Canada at the 1969 federal NDP convention. However, the Waffle lost the vote and Lloyd's support for the movement and his willingness to open the party to debate proved contentious among the party at home. After a special caucus meeting in 1970 in which Lloyd judged he lacked the support of much of his cabinet, he decided to resign as party leader.

In July 1970, Allan Blakeney, who had served as Minister of Health under Lloyd, was elected as the new NDP leader. Lloyd opted not to run in the 1971 election, which saw Blakeney guide the NDP back to a majority government on a rejuvenated platform that incorporated elements of Waffle policy and promised a return to the interventionist approach of the CCF.

== After politics ==
Upon Lloyd's retirement, Tommy Douglas stated that Lloyd had been "the conscience of the government and the conscience of the party." In 1971, Lloyd was appointed as representative for the United Nations Development Program in South Korea. However, in 1972, just months after assuming that post, he died suddenly in Seoul.

== Electoral history ==
Electoral history of CCF-NDP under Woodrow Lloyd
Year	Party	Votes			Seats		Position
Year	Party	Total	%	±%	Total	±	Position
1964	CCF-NDP	268,742	40.3%	–0.5%	26 / 59	–11	Official Opposition
1967	CCF-NDP	188,653	44.4%	+4.1%	24 / 59	–2	Official Opposition

Constituency elections

E Elected
X Incumbent

General Election, June 15, 1944: Biggar
Party	Candidate	Popular Vote	%
Co-operative Commonwealth Federation	E Woodrow Lloyd	3,633	62.76%
Liberal	Frank Freeman	2,156	37.24%
Total		5,789	100.00%
Source: Saskatchewan Archives — Election Results by Electoral Division

General Election, June 24, 1948: Biggar
Party	Candidate	Popular Vote	%
Co-operative Commonwealth Federation	E X Woodrow Lloyd	3,695	55.30%
Liberal	Andrew Stewart Shaw	2,987	44.70%
Total		6,682	100.00%
Source: Saskatchewan Archives — Election Results by Electoral Division

General Election, June 11, 1952: Biggar
Party	Candidate	Popular Vote	%
Co-operative Commonwealth Federation	E X Woodrow Lloyd	3,811	64.18%
Liberal	Andrew Stewart Shaw	2,127	35.82%
Total		5,938	100.00%
Source: Saskatchewan Archives — Election Results by Electoral Division

General Election, June 20, 1956: Biggar
Party	Candidate	Popular Vote	%
Co-operative Commonwealth Federation	E X Woodrow Lloyd	3,182	56.10%
Liberal	Frank Freeman	1,720	30.32%
Social Credit	Edward Wilfred Maybuck	770	13.58%
Total		5,672	100.00%
Source: Saskatchewan Archives — Election Results by Electoral Division

General Election, June 8, 1960: Biggar
Party	Candidate	Popular Vote	%
Co-operative Commonwealth Federation	E X Woodrow Lloyd	3,049	51.66%
Liberal	Andrew Douglas Hutchison	1,932	32.73%
Progressive Conservative	Jack Lehmond	663	11.23%
Social Credit	Henry Neufeld	258	4.37%
Total		5,902	99.99%^{1}
Source: Saskatchewan Archives — Election Results by Electoral Division

General Election, April 22, 1964: Biggar
Party	Candidate	Popular Vote	%
Co-operative Commonwealth Federation	E X Woodrow Lloyd	2,875	48.02%
Liberal	Benson McLeod Blacklock	1,992	33.27%
Progressive Conservative	George Loucks	1,120	18.71%
Total		5,987	100.00%
Source: Saskatchewan Archives — Election Results by Electoral Division

General Election, October 11, 1967: Biggar
Party	Candidate	Popular Vote	%
New Democratic Party	E X Woodrow Lloyd	2,916	50.09%
Liberal	Elmer McNiven	1,571	26.99%
Progressive Conservative	Peter Wiebe	1,334	22.92%
Total		5,821	100.00%
Source: Saskatchewan Archives — Election Results by Electoral Division

== See also ==
- List of premiers of Saskatchewan
