= Frederick Arthur Dewhurst =

Canadian politician and farmer

Frederick Arthur Dewhurst (March 17, 1911 – July 30, 1985) was a farmer and political figure in Saskatchewan, Canada. He represented Wadena in the Legislative Assembly of Saskatchewan from 1945 to 1975 as a member of the CCF/NDP.

He was born in Regina, Saskatchewan, the son of Aaron Dewhurst and Amelia Cameron, and was educated in the Barrier Lake area. Dewhurst married Doris Stewart. He farmed in the Archerwill district until 1967, when he moved to Wynyard. He was first elected to the Saskatchewan assembly in a 1945 by-election held after George Hara Williams resigned his seat. He served as speaker for the assembly from 1962 to 1964 and from 1971 to 1975. Dewhurst retired from politics in 1975.
