= Last Mountain-Touchwood =

Provincial electoral district in Saskatchewan, Canada

Coordinates: 51°10′N 104°00′W

Saskatchewan electoral district

Provincial electoral district
- Legislature: Legislative Assembly of Saskatchewan
MLA
Travis Keisig
Saskatchewan
- District created: 1975
- First contested: 1975
- Last contested: 2024

Demographics
- Electors: 10,086
- Census division(s): 6, 10, 11

Last Mountain-Touchwood is a provincial electoral district for the Legislative Assembly of Saskatchewan, Canada. Located in southern Saskatchewan, major communities in the district include the towns of Strasbourg, Ituna, Lemberg, Southey, and Balcarres. Villages in the district include Punnichy, Kelliher, Lestock, Abernethy, Goodeve, Neudorf, and Lebret.

The district is named for Last Mountain Lake, which forms the western edge of the constituency, and the Touchwood Hills, which are located in the central and eastern part of the constituency.

== History ==
Last Mountain-Touchwood was created by combining the district of Last Mountain with part of the constituency of Touchwood. The district's southern and western boundaries have changed little since its creation, though the riding has been expanded eastward over the years. The most significant expansion occurred before the 2003 general election, when the riding picked up the western half of the former Melville constituency upon its dissolution.

== Members of the Legislative Assembly ==
Legislature	Years	Member	Party
18th	1975–1978	Gordon MacMurchy	NDP
19th	1978–1982	Gordon MacMurchy	NDP
20th	1982–1986	Arnold Tusa	Progressive Conservative
21st	1986–1991	Arnold Tusa	Progressive Conservative
22nd	1991–1995	Dale Flavel	NDP
23rd	1995–1999	Dale Flavel	NDP
24th	1999–2003	Glen Hart	Saskatchewan Party
25th	2003–2007	Glen Hart	Saskatchewan Party
26th	2007–2011	Glen Hart	Saskatchewan Party
27th	2011–2016	Glen Hart	Saskatchewan Party
28th	2016–2020	Glen Hart	Saskatchewan Party
29th	2020–2024	Travis Keisig	Saskatchewan Party
30th	2024–present	Travis Keisig	Saskatchewan Party

== Election results ==
2024 Saskatchewan general election
Party	Candidate	Votes	%	±%
Saskatchewan	Travis Keisig	4,144	53.08	-9.36
New Democratic	Thera Nordal	2,501	32.04	+6.85
Saskatchewan United	Gene Unruh	1,107	14.18	–
Buffalo	Elvin Mandziak	55	0.70	-5.05
Total valid votes		7,807	99.35	
Total rejected ballots		51	0.65	
Turnout		7,858	61.36	
Eligible voters		12,807		
Saskatchewan hold		Swing		
Source: Elections Saskatchewan

2020 Saskatchewan general election
Party	Candidate	Votes	%	±%
Saskatchewan	Travis Keisig	4,461	62.44	+0.27
New Democratic	Thera Nordal	1,800	25.19	+2.33
Buffalo	Gordon Bradford	411	5.75	–
Progressive Conservative	Victor Teece	327	4.58	-5.44
Green	Justin Stranack	146	2.04	+0.53
Total valid votes		7,145	99.55	
Total rejected ballots		32	0.45	+0.19
Turnout		7,177	71.16	+11.40
Eligible voters		10,086		
Saskatchewan hold		Swing		–
Source: Elections Saskatchewan

2016 Saskatchewan general election
Party	Candidate	Votes	%	±%
Saskatchewan	Glen Hart	4,274	62.17	-5.32
New Democratic	Mary Ann Harrison	1,572	22.86	-6.08
Progressive Conservative	Richard Swenson	689	10.02	-
Liberal	David Buchocik	212	3.08	-
Green	Justin Stranack	104	1.51	-1.64
Western Independence	Frank J. Serfas	23	0.33	-0.09
Total valid votes		6,874	99.74	
Total rejected ballots		18	0.26	–
Turnout		6,892	59.76	–
Eligible voters		11,533		
Source: Elections Saskatchewan

Saskatchewan General Election 2011, Last Mountain-Touchwood
Party	Candidate	Votes	%	±%
Saskatchewan	Glen Hart	4,778	67.49	+7.10
NDP	Don Jeworski	2,049	28.94	-1.91
Green	Greg Chatterson	223	3.15	+0.86
Western Independence	Frank Serfas	30	0.42	-
Total		7,080	100.00	

Saskatchewan General Election 2007, Last Mountain-Touchwood
Party	Candidate	Votes	%	±%
Saskatchewan	Glen Hart	4,736	60.39	+11.97
NDP	Jordon Hillier	2,419	30.85	-8.90
Liberal	Deon Kalaman	507	6.47	-2.69
Green	Wybo Ottenbreit-Born	180	2.29	–
Total		7,842	100.00	

Saskatchewan General Election 2003, Last Mountain-Touchwood
Party	Candidate	Votes	%	±%
Saskatchewan	Glen Hart	3,722	48.42	+1.11
NDP	Jordon Hillier	3,055	39.75	+3.92
Liberal	Gregory Peter Burton	704	9.16	-7.70
Western Independence	Merv Werk	205	2.67	–
Total		7,686	100.00	

Saskatchewan General Election 1999, Last Mountain-Touchwood
Party	Candidate	Votes	%	±%
Saskatchewan	Glen Hart	3,806	47.31	–
NDP	Dale Flavel	2,882	35.83	-10.33
Liberal	Ken Kluz	1,356	16.86	-23.20
Total		8,044	100.00	

Saskatchewan General Election 1995, Last Mountain-Touchwood
Party	Candidate	Votes	%	±%
NDP	Dale Flavel	3,711	46.16	-2.43
Liberal	Pat Edenoste	3,221	40.06	+19.66
Prog. Conservative	Wesley Chamberlin	1,108	13.78	-16.66
Total		8,040	100.00	

Saskatchewan General Election 1991, Last Mountain-Touchwood
Party	Candidate	Votes	%	±%
NDP	Dale Flavel	4,028	48.59	+1.96
Prog. Conservative	Arnold Tusa	2,523	30.44	-17.25
Liberal	Ed Bespalko	1,691	20.40	+14.72
Independent	Paul Chesterton	47	0.57	–
Total		8,289	100.00	

Saskatchewan General Election 1986, Last Mountain-Touchwood
Party	Candidate	Votes	%	±%
Prog. Conservative	Arnold Tusa	4,032	47.69	-3.12
NDP	Gordon MacMurchy	3,943	46.63	+1.68
Liberal	Charles Schuler	480	5.68	+3.85
Total		8,455	100.00	

Saskatchewan General Election 1982, Last Mountain-Touchwood
Party	Candidate	Votes	%	±%
Prog. Conservative	Arnold Tusa	4,588	50.81	+5.25
NDP	Gordon MacMurchy	4,059	44.95	-4.87
Western Canada Concept	Jack McMunn	218	2.41	–
Liberal	Charles Schuler	165	1.83	-2.79
Total		9,030	100.00	

Saskatchewan General Election 1978, Last Mountain-Touchwood
Party	Candidate	Votes	%	±%
NDP	Gordon MacMurchy	4,150	49.82	+4.46
Prog. Conservative	Arnold Tusa	3,795	45.56	+13.59
Liberal	Gill Fontaine	385	4.62	-18.05
Total		8,330	100.00	

Saskatchewan General Election 1975, Last Mountain-Touchwood
Party	Candidate	Votes	%	±%
NDP	Gordon MacMurchy	3,640	45.36	–
Prog. Conservative	Arnold Tusa	2,565	31.97	–
Liberal	Les Digney	1,819	22.67	–
Total		8,024	100.00	

== Historical MLAs ==
=== Members of the Legislative Assembly – Last Mountain ===
#	MLA	Served	Party
1.	Thomas Arnold Anderson	1908–1912	Provincial Rights
2.	Samuel John Latta	1912–1929	Liberal
3.	Jacob Benson	1929–1934	Progressive
4.	Guy Hartsel Hummel	1934–1938	Liberal
5.	Jacob Benson	1938–1952	CCF
6.	Russell Brown	1952–1964	CCF
7.	Donald MacLennan	1964–1971	Liberal
8.	Gordon MacMurchy	1971–1975	New Democrat

=== Members of the Legislative Assembly – Touchwood ===
#	MLA	Served	Party
1.	George Maitland Atkinson	1908–1917	Liberal
2.	John Mason Parker	1917–1938	Liberal
3.	Tom Johnston	1938–1956	CCF
4.	Frank Meakes	1956–1964	CCF
5.	George Trapp	1964–1967	Liberal
6.	Frank Meakes	1967–1975	New Democrat

== See also ==
- List of Saskatchewan provincial electoral districts
- List of Saskatchewan general elections
- Canadian provincial electoral districts
