= John Mason Parker (Saskatchewan politician) =

Canadian politician

3rd Clerk of the Legislative Assembly of Saskatchewan
- In office December 16, 1939 – April 30, 1949
- Speaker: Charles Agar; Tom Johnston
- Preceded by: George Arthur Mantle
- Succeeded by: George Stephen

9th Speaker of the Legislative Assembly of Saskatchewan
- In office November 15, 1934 – May 14, 1938
- Preceded by: Robert Sterritt Leslie
- Succeeded by: Charles Agar

Member of the Legislative Assembly of Saskatchewan
- In office June 26, 1917 – June 8, 1938
- Preceded by: George Maitland Atkinson
- Succeeded by: Tom Johnston
- Constituency: Touchwood

Personal details
- Born: August 19, 1882 Watford, Ontario, Canada
- Died: December 19, 1960 (aged 78) Watford, Ontario, Canada
- Party: Liberal
- Occupation: Farmer

John Mason Parker (August 19, 1882– December 19, 1960) was a farmer and political figure in Saskatchewan, Canada. He represented Touchwood from 1917 to 1938 in the Legislative Assembly of Saskatchewan as a Liberal. Parker was speaker for the Saskatchewan assembly from 1934 to 1938.

He was the son of William Parker and Sarah Taylor and was born and educated in Watford, Ontario. In 1903, he married Mary Elizabeth Saunders. Parker served on the council for the rural municipality of Kellross, also serving as reeve. Parker lived in Kelliher. He served as clerk for the Saskatchewan assembly from 1939 to 1949. He died in Watford, Ontario on December 19, 1960.
