= Glen Hart =

Canadian politician (born 1946)

Member of the Saskatchewan Legislative Assembly for Last Mountain-Touchwood
- In office September 16, 1999 – September 29, 2020
- Preceded by: Dale Flavel
- Succeeded by: Travis Keisig

Personal details
- Born: Glen Philip Hart; July 31, 1946 (age 80) Cupar, Saskatchewan
- Party: Saskatchewan Party
- Profession: Management

Glen Philip Hart (born July 31, 1946) is a Canadian provincial politician. He was a Saskatchewan Party member of the Legislative Assembly of Saskatchewan and represented the constituency of Last Mountain-Touchwood from 1999 to 2020.

== Political history ==
Hart was first elected in the 1999 general election, the first for the fledgling Saskatchewan Party, then under the leadership of former Reform Party Member of Parliament Elwin Hermanson. Hart and the Saskatchewan Party ultimately spent two terms in Opposition, and during those terms Hart served as critic for higher education, highways, the environment, and labour. The Saskatchewan Party won the 2007 general election under the leadership of Brad Wall; Hart was re-elected in 2007, and again in the 2011 and 2016 elections. While the Saskatchewan Party formed government, Hart was a backbencher who served on several caucus committees.

In January 2019, Hart announced that he would not be running for re-election in the 2020 provincial election.

In the lead-up to the 2024 general election, Hart joined fellow former Saskatchewan Party MLA Mark Docherty and former party staffer Ian Hanna in endorsing Carla Beck and the Saskatchewan New Democratic Party instead of the Saskatchewan Party. Hart stated that his former party "were putting the interest of the Sask. Party ahead of the interest of the people of the province", citing in particular its handling of the COVID-19 pandemic and the healthcare system. The trio of former Saskatchewan Party members all argued that the party had moved further to the right in recent years, which encouraged them to look more closely at Beck's NDP.

== Personal life ==
Hart was born in Cupar, Saskatchewan, and received a degree in Agricultural Economics from the University of Saskatchewan. He worked in government at both the federal and provincial levels prior to entering electoral politics. He was long involved in local minor hockey. Hart and his wife Marlene have three children.

== Electoral record ==
2016 Saskatchewan general election: Last Mountain-Touchwood
Party	Candidate	Votes	%
Saskatchewan	Glen Hart	4,274	62.18
New Democratic	Mary Ann Harrison	1,572	22.87
Progressive Conservative	Rick Swenson	689	10.02
Liberal	David Buchocik	212	3.08
Green	Justin Stranack	104	1.51
Western Independence	Frank Serfas	23	0.34
Total		6,874	100.0
Source: Saskatchewan Archives - Election Results by Electoral Division; Elections Saskatchewan

2011 Saskatchewan general election: Last Mountain-Touchwood
Party	Candidate	Votes	%
Saskatchewan	Glen Hart	4,778	67.49
New Democratic	Don Jeworski	2,049	28.94
Green	Greg Chatterson	223	3.15
Western Independence	Frank Serfas	30	0.42
Total		7,080	100.0
Source: Saskatchewan Archives - Election Results by Electoral Division

2007 Saskatchewan general election: Last Mountain-Touchwood
Party	Candidate	Votes	%
Saskatchewan	Glen Hart	4,736	60.39
New Democratic	Jordon Hillier	2,419	30.85
Liberal	Deon Kalaman	507	6.47
Green	Wybo Ottenbreit-Born	180	2.29
Total		7,842	100.0
Source: Saskatchewan Archives - Election Results by Electoral Division

2003 Saskatchewan general election: Last Mountain-Touchwood
Party	Candidate	Votes	%
Saskatchewan	Glen Hart	3,722	48.42
New Democratic	Jordon Hillier	3,055	39.75
Liberal	Gregory Burton	704	9.16
Western Independence	Merv Werk	205	2.67
Total		7,686	100.0
Source: Saskatchewan Archives - Election Results by Electoral Division

1999 Saskatchewan general election: Last Mountain-Touchwood
Party	Candidate	Votes	%
Saskatchewan	Glen Hart	3,816	47.18
New Democratic	Dale Flavel	2,909	35.97
Liberal	Kenneth Kluz	1,363	16.85
Total		8,088	100.0
Source: Saskatchewan Archives - Election Results by Electoral Division
