= Touchwood (electoral district) =

Former provincial electoral district in Saskatchewan, Canada

Coordinates: 51°18′N 104°07′W

Touchwood is a former provincial electoral district for the Legislative Assembly of the province of Saskatchewan, Canada. Located south of the Wynyard district in east-central Saskatchewan, it was centred on the Touchwood Hills.

This constituency was created for the 2nd Saskatchewan general election in 1908. It was dissolved and combined with the Last Mountain riding (as Last Mountain-Touchwood) before the 18th Saskatchewan general election in 1975.

== Members of the Legislative Assembly ==
#	MLA	Served	Party
1.	George Maitland Atkinson	1908–1917	Liberal
2.	John Mason Parker	1917–1938	Liberal
3.	Tom Johnston	1938–1956	CCF
4.	Frank Meakes	1956–1964	CCF
5.	George Trapp	1964–1967	Liberal
6.	Frank Meakes	1967–1975	New Democrat

== Election results ==
1908 Saskatchewan general election: Touchwood electoral district
Party	Candidate	Votes	%	±%
Liberal	George Maitland Atkinson	566	57.87%	–
Provincial Rights	Joseph Hollis	412	42.13%	–
Total		978	100.00%	

1912 Saskatchewan general election: Touchwood electoral district
Party	Candidate	Votes	%	±%
Liberal	George Maitland Atkinson	1,066	70.04%	+12.17
Conservative	William Brice	456	29.96%	-12.17
Total		1,522	100.00%	

1917 Saskatchewan general election: Touchwood electoral district
Party	Candidate	Votes	%	±%
Liberal	John Mason Parker	2,163	72.10%	+2.06
Conservative	John Ernest Johnson	837	27.90%	-2.06
Total		3,000	100.00%	

1921 Saskatchewan general election: Touchwood electoral district
Party	Candidate	Votes	%	±%
Liberal	John Mason Parker	1,734	58.50%	-13.60
Nonpartisan League	Alton Ernest Bolton	1,230	41.50%	–
Total		2,964	100.00%	

1925 Saskatchewan general election: Touchwood electoral district
Party	Candidate	Votes	%	±%
Liberal	John Mason Parker	1,737	51.33%	-7.17
Progressive	George Maitland Atkinson	1,647	48.67%	+7.17
Total		3,384	100.00%	

1929 Saskatchewan general election: Touchwood electoral district
Party	Candidate	Votes	%	±%
Liberal	John Mason Parker	2,457	58.72%	+7.39
Progressive	David C. Cragg	1,727	41.28%	-7.39
Total		4,184	100.00%	

1934 Saskatchewan general election: Touchwood electoral district
Party	Candidate	Votes	%	±%
Liberal	John Mason Parker	3,380	42.16%	-16.56
Farmer-Labour	Edward Hamilton	2,273	28.36%	-12.92
Independent	William James Burak	1,845	23.02%	–
Conservative	Caleb Henry Fisher	518	6.46%	-
Total		8,016	100.00%	

1938 Saskatchewan general election: Touchwood electoral district
Party	Candidate	Votes	%	±%
CCF	Tom Johnston	2,301	34.01%	+5.65
Liberal	John Mason Parker	1,910	28.23%	-13.93
Conservative	John Hnatyshyn	1,287	19.02%	+12.56
Social Credit	Hugh H. Lyle	1,268	18.74%	–
Total		6,766	100.00%	

1944 Saskatchewan general election: Touchwood electoral district
Party	Candidate	Votes	%	±%
CCF	Tom Johnston	3,337	59.99%	+25.98
Liberal	John J. Collins	1,925	34.60%	+6.37
Prog. Conservative	William Seneshen	301	5.41%	-13.61
Total		5,563	100.00%	

1948 Saskatchewan general election: Touchwood electoral district
Party	Candidate	Votes	%	±%
CCF	Tom Johnston	2,627	42.49%	-17.50
Liberal	John J. Collins	2,459	39.77%	+5.17
Social Credit	Harold Fletcher	1,097	17.74%	-
Total		6,183	100.00%	

1952 Saskatchewan general election: Touchwood electoral district
Party	Candidate	Votes	%	±%
CCF	Tom Johnston	3,614	49.68%	+7.19
Liberal	John J. Collins	2,726	37.48%	-2.29
Social Credit	Gustav D. Pelzer	934	12.84%	-4.90
Total		7,274	100.00%	

1956 Saskatchewan general election: Touchwood electoral district
Party	Candidate	Votes	%	±%
CCF	Frank Meakes	2,757	38.17%	-11.51
Liberal	Lloyd B. Crawford	2,284	31.63%	-5.85
Social Credit	Morris J. Wowk	1,964	27.20%	+14.36
Prog. Conservative	James N. Ormiston	217	3.00%	-
Total		7,222	100.00%	

1960 Saskatchewan general election: Touchwood electoral district
Party	Candidate	Votes	%	±%
CCF	Frank Meakes	2,457	37.18%	-0.99
Liberal	Harold K. Van Luven	1,844	27.90%	-3.73
Social Credit	Matt Stecyk	1,372	20.76%	-6.44
Prog. Conservative	Thomas W. Drever	936	14.16%	+11.16
Total		6,609	100.00%	

1964 Saskatchewan general election: Touchwood electoral district
Party	Candidate	Votes	%	±%
Liberal	George Trapp	2,692	40.92%	+13.02
NDP	Frank Meakes	2,566	39.01%	+1.83
Prog. Conservative	Alice M.L. Turner	1,320	20.07%	+5.91
Total		6,578	100.00%	

1967 Saskatchewan general election: Touchwood electoral district
Party	Candidate	Votes	%	±%
NDP	Frank Meakes	3,002	52.53%	+13.52
Liberal	George Trapp	2,713	47.47%	+6.55
Total		5,715	100.00%	

1971 Saskatchewan general election: Touchwood electoral district
Party	Candidate	Votes	%	±%
NDP	Frank Meakes	4,450	55.99%	+3.46
Liberal	Walter E. Schabel	2,605	32.78%	-14.69
Prog. Conservative	Arnold B. Tusa	893	11.23%	-
Total		7,948	100.00%	

== See also ==
- List of Saskatchewan provincial electoral districts
- List of Saskatchewan general elections
- Canadian provincial electoral districts
- Raymore, Saskatchewan
