= Travis Keisig =

Canadian politician

The Honourable Travis Keisig ECS MLA

Member of the Saskatchewan Legislative Assembly for Last Mountain-Touchwood
- Incumbent
- Assumed office October 26, 2020
- Preceded by: Glen Hart

Personal details
- Party: Saskatchewan Party

Travis Keisig is a Canadian politician, who was elected to the Legislative Assembly of Saskatchewan in the 2020 Saskatchewan general election. He represents the electoral district of Last Mountain-Touchwood as a member of the Saskatchewan Party.
