= Last Mountain (provincial electoral district) =

Former provincial electoral district in Saskatchewan, Canada

Coordinates: 51°12′N 105°10′W

Last Mountain is a former provincial electoral district for the Legislative Assembly of the province of Saskatchewan, Canada. Centred on the town of Strasbourg, it included the northern half of Last Mountain Lake.

This constituency was created for the 2nd Saskatchewan general election in 1908. It was dissolved and combined with the Touchwood district (as Last Mountain-Touchwood) before the 18th Saskatchewan general election in 1975.

A federal electoral district in the same area existed from 1914 to 1935.

== Members of the Legislative Assembly ==
#	MLA	Served	Party
1.	Thomas Arnold Anderson	1908–1912	Provincial Rights
2.	Samuel John Latta	1912–1929	Liberal
3.	Jacob Benson	1929–1934	Progressive
4.	Guy Hartsel Hummel	1934–1938	Liberal
5.	Jacob Benson	1938–1952	CCF
6.	Russell Brown	1952–1964	CCF
7.	Donald MacLennan	1964–1971	Liberal
8.	Gordon MacMurchy	1971–1975	New Democrat

== Election results ==
1908 Saskatchewan general election: Last Mountain electoral district
Party	Candidate	Votes	%	±%
Provincial Rights	Thomas Arnold Anderson	1,204	57.12%	–
Liberal	Samuel John Latta	904	42.88%	–
Total		2,108	100.00%	

1912 Saskatchewan general election: Last Mountain electoral district
Party	Candidate	Votes	%	±%
Liberal	Samuel John Latta	1,449	64.63%	+21.75
Conservative	Thomas Arnold Anderson	793	35.37%	-21.75
Total		2,242	100.00%	

1917 Saskatchewan general election: Last Mountain electoral district
Party	Candidate	Votes	%	±%
Liberal	Samuel John Latta	2,340	60.51%	-4.12
Nonpartisan League	John Julian Cameron	1,527	39.49%	–
Total		3,867	100.00%	

November 6, 1917 By-Election: Last Mountain electoral district
Party	Candidate	Votes	%	±%
Liberal	Samuel John Latta	Acclaimed	100.00%	
Total		Acclamation		

1921 Saskatchewan general election: Last Mountain electoral district
Party	Candidate	Votes	%	±%
Liberal	Samuel John Latta	Acclaimed	100.00%	
Total		Acclamation		

1925 Saskatchewan general election: Last Mountain electoral district
Party	Candidate	Votes	%	±%
Liberal	Samuel John Latta	2,503	55.06%	-
Conservative	Gustavus Mackay	2,043	44.94%	-
Total		4,546	100.00%	

1929 Saskatchewan general election: Last Mountain electoral district
Party	Candidate	Votes	%	±%
Progressive	Jacob Benson	3,521	58.50%	–
Liberal	Samuel John Latta	2,498	41.50%	-13.56
Total		6,019	100.00%	

1934 Saskatchewan general election: Last Mountain electoral district
Party	Candidate	Votes	%	±%
Liberal	Guy Hummel	2,732	40.30%	-1.20
Farmer-Labour	Jacob Benson	2,709	39.96%	-18.54
Conservative	Allan A. Peters	1,338	19.74%	-
Total		6,779	100.00%	

1938 Saskatchewan general election: Last Mountain electoral district
Party	Candidate	Votes	%	±%
CCF	Jacob Benson	3,299	38.86%	-1.10
Liberal	Guy Hummel	3,168	37.32%	-2.98
Conservative	Alfred J. Dyer	1,121	13.20%	-6.54
Social Credit	William H. Schroder	902	10.62%	–
Total		8,490	100.00%	

1944 Saskatchewan general election: Last Mountain electoral district
Party	Candidate	Votes	%	±%
CCF	Jacob Benson	3,803	53.20%	+14.34
Liberal	Henry P. Mang	2,064	28.88%	-8.44
Prog. Conservative	James L. Blair	1,281	17.92%	+4.72
Total		7,148	100.00%	

1948 Saskatchewan general election: Last Mountain electoral district
Party	Candidate	Votes	%	±%
CCF	Jacob Benson	3,755	47.09%	-6.11
Liberal	James W. Gardiner	3,001	37.63%	+8.75
Social Credit	Godfrey Kelln	1,219	15.28%	-
Total		7,975	100.00%	

1952 Saskatchewan general election: Last Mountain electoral district
Party	Candidate	Votes	%	±%
CCF	Russell Brown	3,483	44.90%	-2.19
Liberal	James W. Gardiner	2,272	29.29%	-8.34
Independent	Jacob Benson	1,087	14.01%	–
Social Credit	Martin Kelln	915	11.80%	-3.48
Total		7,757	100.00%	

1956 Saskatchewan general election: Last Mountain electoral district
Party	Candidate	Votes	%	±%
CCF	Russell Brown	2,911	38.62%	-6.28
Liberal	Gerhard H. Holfeld	2,404	31.89%	+2.60
Social Credit	Martin Kelln	2,223	29.49%	+17.69
Total		7,538	100.00%	

1960 Saskatchewan general election: Last Mountain electoral district
Party	Candidate	Votes	%	±%
CCF	Russell Brown	2,566	34.89%	-3.73
Social Credit	Martin Kelln	2,035	27.67%	-1.82
Liberal	Donald MacLennan	2,000	27.20%	-4.69
Prog. Conservative	Charles A. Nichol	753	10.24%	-
Total		7,354	100.00%	

1964 Saskatchewan general election: Last Mountain electoral district
Party	Candidate	Votes	%	±%
Liberal	Donald MacLennan	2,857	40.59%	+13.39
CCF	Russell Brown	2,799	39.77%	+4.88
Social Credit	Martin Kelln	1,382	19.64%	-8.03
Total		7,038	100.00%	

1967 Saskatchewan general election: Last Mountain electoral district
Party	Candidate	Votes	%	±%
Liberal	Donald MacLennan	2,425	41.67%	+1.08
NDP	Gordon MacMurchy	2,399	41.23%	+1.46
Prog. Conservative	George Richardson	995	17.10%	-
Total		5,819	100.00%	

1971 Saskatchewan general election: Last Mountain electoral district
Party	Candidate	Votes	%	±%
NDP	Gordon MacMurchy	2,646	51.95%	+10.72
Liberal	Donald MacLennan	2,447	48.05%	+6.38
Total		5,093	100.00%	

== See also ==
- List of Saskatchewan provincial electoral districts
- List of Saskatchewan general elections
- Canadian provincial electoral districts
