= Gordon MacMurchy =

Canadian politician

Gordon MacMurchy SOM

MLA for Last Mountain
- In office 1971–1975
- Preceded by: Donald MacLennan
- Succeeded by: riding dissolved

MLA for Last Mountain-Touchwood
- In office 1975–1982
- Preceded by: first member
- Succeeded by: Arnold Tusa

Personal details
- Born: July 4, 1926 Semans, Saskatchewan
- Died: April 20, 2005 (aged 78) Nokomis, Saskatchewan
- Party: New Democrat
- Spouse: Jean Neff

Gordon Samuel MacMurchy (1926-2005) was a Canadian politician, who represented the electoral district of Last Mountain from 1971 to 1975, and Last Mountain-Touchwood from 1975 to 1982, in the Legislative Assembly of Saskatchewan. He was a member of the Saskatchewan New Democratic Party. He served as a cabinet minister in the government of Allan Blakeney.

The son of Edward Gordon MacMurchy and Laura Geiger, he took over the operation of the family farm in 1962. From 1962 to 1971, he served as a trustee for the Govan school unit, also serving two years as chairman. MacMurchy served as Minister of Education, Minister of Municipal Affairs and Minister of Agriculture in the Saskatchewan cabinet. He was defeated when he ran for reelection to the assembly in 1982. After leaving provincial politics, MacMurchy was mayor of Semans from 1982 to 1997. He ran unsuccessfully in the provincial riding of Last Mountain-Touchwood in 1986.

In 1949, he married Jean Neff.

Also active in sport, his tenure with the Semans Wheat Kings earned five provincial intermediate C championships, and six Last Mountain Hockey League championships. MacMurchy received the Canadian Amateur Hockey Association Trophy for service to minor hockey in 1969. He served as an umpire, and was inducted into the Saskatchewan Baseball Hall of Fame in 1989. In October 1999, he received the Saskatchewan Order of Merit.

MacMurchy died in Nokomis, Saskatchewan at the age of 78.
