= Marquis Downs =

Horse racing venue in Saskatchewan, Canada

- Location: Saskatoon, Saskatchewan
- Coordinates: 52.09497°N 106.67782°W
- Owned by: Saskatoon Prairieland Park Corp.
- Date opened: 1969
- Date closed: 2021
- Race type: Thoroughbred
- Course type: Oval
- Notable races: Prairie Lily Stakes; Saskatchewan Derby; Saskatchewan Futurity

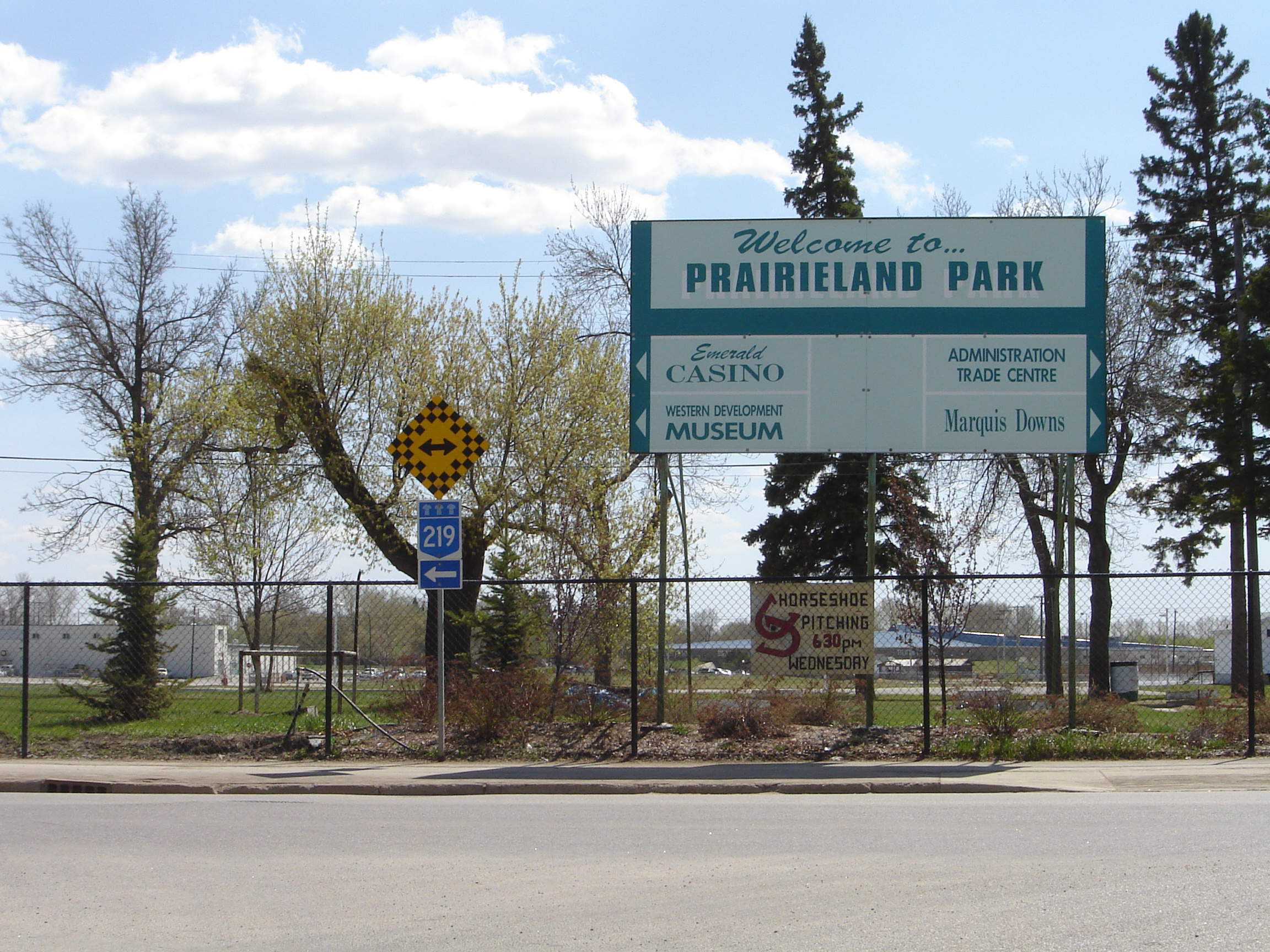
Marquis Downs at Prairieland Park

Marquis Downs was a horse racing venue in the Exhibition subdivision of Saskatoon, Saskatchewan, Canada. It featured thoroughbred horse racing.

== History ==
Marquis Downs opened in 1969 with thoroughbred racing. It is part of the Saskatoon Prairieland Park Corporation. Harness racing was discontinued after the 1987 season, but returned from 2005 to 2010.

In 2020, Marquis Downs cancelled its season due to the COVID-19 pandemic in Saskatchewan. In February 2021, Marquis Downs cancelled its 2021 season, stating that current health orders, international travel restrictions, and financial impacts of holding races without spectators made it logistically impossible to conduct racing.

On March 12, 2021, Saskatoon Prairieland Park Corporation announced that Marquis Downs would no longer host thoroughbred racing. Prairieland Park announced that it was in negotiations with Living Sky Sports and Entertainment (LSSE) to repurpose the site for a soccer-specific stadium for a proposed Canadian Premier League expansion club. However, in September 2023, Prairieland Park CEO Dan Kemppainen stated that the project was on "pause", and that the increasing cost projection of the stadium had made it unfeasible.

The City of Saskatoon began exploring demolition of the track, grandstand and horse barn in September 2025 for the development of a gravel parking lot.

== Physical attributes ==
The main track was a five-furlong oval with a seven furlong chute. The grandstand capacity was 3,500. The track was located in the southwest corner of the Prairieland Exhibition Grounds, with access via St. Henry Avenue to the west.

== Racing ==
Marquis Downs offered live thoroughbred racing every Friday and Saturday from late May to the first Saturday of September.

A few stakes races were held at Marquis Downs, most notably the Saskatchewan Derby, Prairie Lily Sales Stake and Heritage Day which showcases the Saskatchewan breeds. The minimum purse in 2007 was $3,000 and the Heritage races featured a $100,000 purse.
