= Jacob Benson =

Canadian politician (1892–1987)

Member of the Saskatchewan Legislative Assembly for Last Mountain
- In office 1938–1952
- Preceded by: Guy Hartsel Hummel
- Succeeded by: Russell Brown
- In office 1929–1934
- Preceded by: Samuel John Latta
- Succeeded by: Guy Hartsel Hummel

Personal details
- Born: March 13, 1892 Calder Bridge, Cumberland, England
- Died: August 23, 1987 (aged 95) Victoria, British Columbia, Canada
- Party: Co-operative Commonwealth Federation; Progressive Party of Saskatchewan
- Occupation: Farmer

Jacob "Jake" Benson (March 13, 1892 – August 23, 1987) was an English-born farmer and politician in Saskatchewan. He represented Last Mountain in the Legislative Assembly of Saskatchewan from 1929 to 1934 as a Progressive Party member and from 1938 to 1952 as a Co-operative Commonwealth Federation (CCF) member.

He was born in Calder Bridge, Cumberland, the son of Jacob Benson and Letitia Barwise, and came to Canada with his parents in 1903. The family settled on a homestead near Last Mountain Lake. Benson studied at the University of Saskatchewan but did not graduate, instead turning to farming. In 1918, he married Hilda Ferris. He farmed near Semans. Benson was defeated when he ran for reelection to the provincial assembly in 1934 as a Farmer-Labour Group candidate. The following year, he was defeated when he ran as a CCF candidate in the Yorkton federal riding. He returned to the provincial legislature in the 1938 election as a CCF member. In 1950, after voting against the government on a number of issues, he left the CCF and sat as an independent in the assembly. Benson was defeated by Russell Brown when he ran for reelection as an independent in 1952. After leaving politics, he returned to farming, retiring in 1964. He then moved to Victoria, British Columbia where he died on August 23, 1987.
