= Dale Flavel =

Canadian politician

MLA for Last Mountain-Touchwood
- In office 1991–1999
- Preceded by: Arnold Tusa
- Succeeded by: Glen Hart

Personal details
- Born: March 16, 1946 (age 80) Strasbourg, Saskatchewan
- Party: New Democrat

Dale Flavel (born March 16, 1946) is a Canadian politician, who represented the electoral district of Last Mountain-Touchwood in the Legislative Assembly of Saskatchewan from 1991 to 1999. He was a member of the Saskatchewan New Democratic Party.
