= Arnold Tusa =

Canadian politician

MLA for Last Mountain-Touchwood
- In office 1982–1991
- Preceded by: Gordon MacMurchy
- Succeeded by: Dale Flavel

19th Speaker of the Legislative Assembly of Saskatchewan
- In office 1986–1991
- Preceded by: Herbert Swan
- Succeeded by: Herman Rolfes

Personal details
- Born: August 23, 1940 (age 85) Cupar, Saskatchewan
- Party: Progressive Conservative

Arnold Bernard Tusa (born August 23, 1940) is a Canadian politician, who represented the electoral district of Last Mountain-Touchwood in the Legislative Assembly of Saskatchewan from 1982 to 1991. A member of the Saskatchewan Progressive Conservative Party, he served as Speaker of the Legislative Assembly in his second term in office from 1986 to 1991.

Born in Cupar, Saskatchewan, he received a B.Ed. from the University of Saskatchewan. Tusa taught school in Saskatchewan and later operated a farm.
