= Frank Meakes =

Canadian politician

Frank Meakes (February 20, 1917 – July 8, 1989) was a political figure in Saskatchewan. He represented Touchwood from 1956 to 1964 as a Co-operative Commonwealth Federation (CCF) member and from 1967 to 1975 as a New Democratic Party (NDP) member in the Legislative Assembly of Saskatchewan.

He was born in Punnichy, Saskatchewan, the son of James Meakes and Elsie Butcher, both natives of England. He was educated near Lestock and by correspondence. Meakes worked on the family farm until 1940, when he settled on his own farm near Lestock. During 1948, he worked at the International Nickel Plant in Sudbury but he returned to farming the following year. Meakes was president of the Lestock Co-operative Association, served on the council for the rural municipality of Emerald, was a director for the Roundplain Telephone Company and served on the local school board. He was defeated by George Trapp when he ran for reelection to the provincial assembly in 1964. Meakes served in the provincial cabinet as Minister of Cooperation and Co-operative Development. After he retired from politics in 1975, Meakes served as mayor of Lestock. He also was a director for the Saskatchewan Housing Corporation and served on the executive for the Parkland Regional Library Board.

Meakes was married twice: first to Mary Luthi in 1943 and then to Margaret (Lazar) Horn in 1977 after the death of his first wife. He died in Lestock at the age of 72.
