= Yorkton Regional High School =

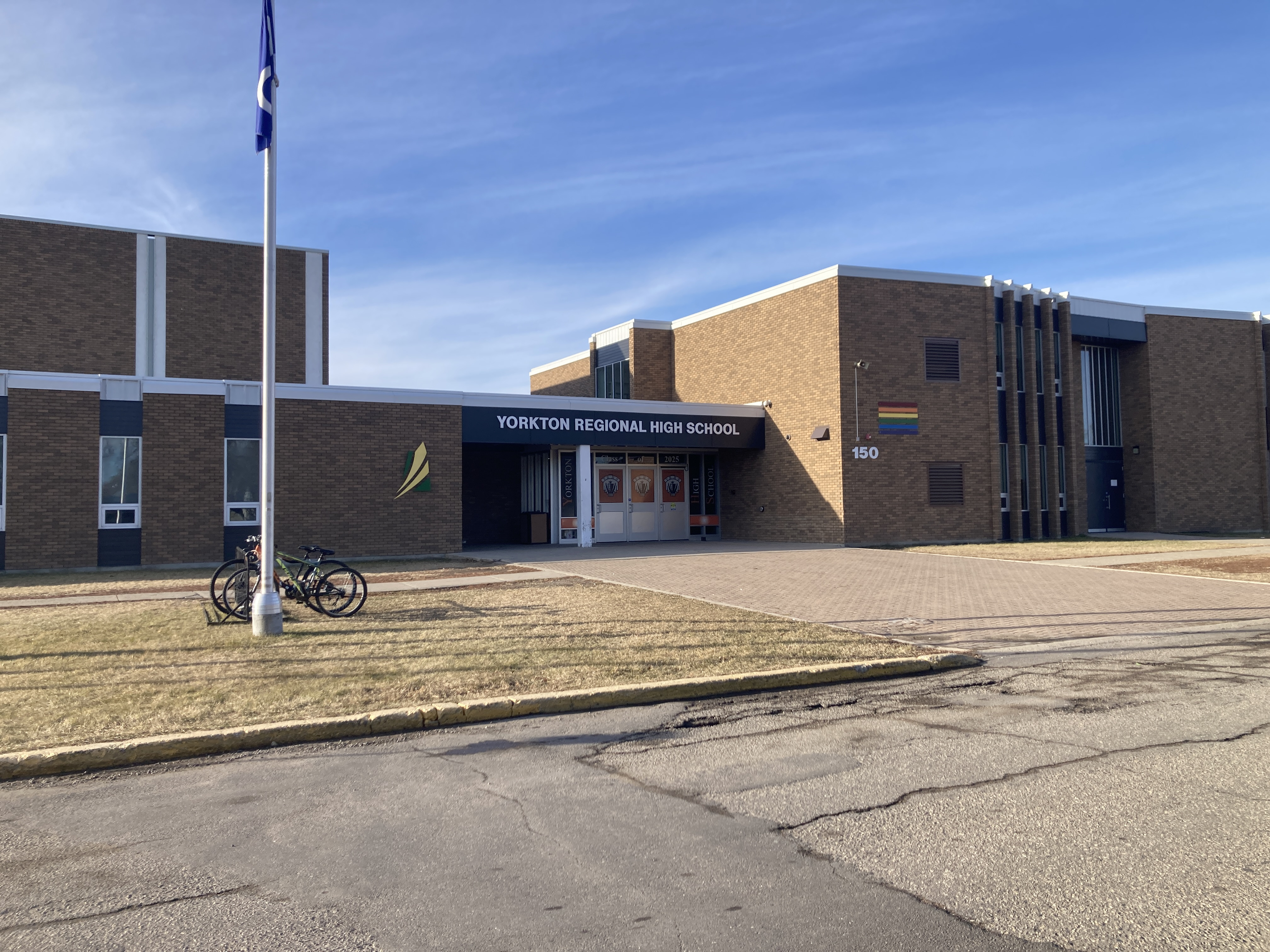
- Front entrance of Yorkton Regional High School

Location
- 150 Gladstone Avenue; Yorkton, Saskatchewan, S3N 2A8; Canada; 51.21604°N 102.47626°W

Information
- School type: High School
- Motto: A Family of Raiders
- Founded: 1967
- School board: Good Spirit School Division
- Principal: Dr. Brandon Needham
- Grades: 9-12
- Enrollment: 801
- Language: English
- Area: Yorkton, Saskatchewan
- Colour: Orange Brown
- Mascot: Colonel Raider
- Team name: Raiders
- Website: yrhs.gssd.ca

Yorkton Regional High School (also known as the YRHS or The Regional) is located in Yorkton, Saskatchewan. The Regional opened its doors on November 10, 1967. As of 2022, the school had a population of 790 students.

The school colour is orange, and "Colonel Raider" is the mascot of YRHS.

As of 2025, the school houses an alternative education department, a hockey academy, in-house driver education, and a school merch shop.

== History ==
Yorkton Regional High School opened on November 10, 1967. Construction on the school began in late 1965 after an agreement between municipal, provincial, and federal parties to develop a new type of comprehensive high school for the region. The building cost approximately C$5 million (about C$48.3 million or U$34.5 million today), and was designed to support both academic and vocational education.

At the time of its opening, the school included 46 classrooms and specialized labs, along with facilities such as a library, theatre, and language laboratories, which were considered advanced for the time. Early planning projected an eventual enrollment of about 2,000 students. The building was also designed for community use; areas of the school could be separated from instructional spaces so that facilities such as the school's theatre could be accessed after hours.

Construction faced challenges due to shortages in electrical components during Expo 67, which placed heavy demand on Canadian electrical manufacturers. Despite delays, including the late arrival of major electrical switchgear, the building was completed in time for the scheduled opening.

The school was influenced by the 1963 Columbia Report, which recommended broadening educational programming in Yorkton to serve a wider range of student needs, including academic, technical, and adult education. During its first year, the school also offered evening courses that drew approximately 500 adult learners.

In 2024, the school underwent a major C$19.1 million renovation (U$13.6 million), funded by the Government of Saskatchewan. The project included upgrades to the heating, ventilation, and air conditioning systems, replacement of windows, electrical system improvements, a new roof, and renovations to the school’s main entrance. Construction was led by Westridge Construction Ltd. of Regina.

== Extracurriculars ==
The Yorkton Regional High School has been number 1 in Canada in the QSP Magazine Campaign for 17 years in a row, each year bringing in over $100,000, going directly towards extracurricular activities and events at the school.

The YRHS Marching 100 marching band was the only Canadian representative in the 1998 Tournament of Roses parade in Pasadena, CA. The YRHS Jazz 1 band represented the country at the Montreux Jazz Festival in Switzerland on July 7, 2006. Just days previous to that, the band took third place in the Vienna International Youth Music Festival.

In 1985, Yorkton Regional High School hosted the very first Canadian Student Leadership Conference (CLSC). This event has taken place every year since and returned to Yorkton in 1995

As of 2025, Yorkton Regional High School has the following extra-curricular activities:

Fine Arts	Clubs	Extracurriculars
Colour Guard; Dance Team; Debate; Drama; Drum; E.C. Choir; Guitar; Jazz Band; Marching Band; Musical; Vocal Jazz	Commercial Cooking; Cosmetology; Courtyard; Culture Club; Indigenous Sports Club; LEGO Club; Mock Trial; Model United Nations; Musical Hair/Make-up; Photography; Public Speaking Club; Raider's Write; Rainbow Club; Robotics; SADD; Skills Canada; Social Activism; Stage Technicians; Video Production	Archery; Badminton; Basketball (Jr. & Sr.); Cheerleading; Cross Country; Curling; Football (Jr. & Sr.); Golf; Soccer; Track & Field; Volleyball (Jr. & Sr.); Wrestling
