= Guy Hartsel Hummel =

Canadian politician

Guy Hartsel Hummel (February 2, 1883 – October 23, 1964) was an American-born farmer and political figure in Saskatchewan. He represented Last Mountain from 1934 to 1938 in the Legislative Assembly of Saskatchewan as a Liberal.

He was born in Humboldt, Nebraska, the son of F.A. Hummel and Mary A. Jones, and came to Saskatchewan in 1905, settling on a homestead near Nokomis. He was a member of the Saskatchewan Grain Growers' Association and was president of the Nokomis Agricultural Society from 1909 to 1916. Hummel served 43 years as reeve of the rural municipality of Wreford. He was a director of the Saskatchewan Association of Rural Municipalities from 1922 to 1927 and was president from 1927 to 1934. Hummel was a director of the Saskatchewan Municipal Hail Association and served as president of the Additional Hail Association from 1958 to 1964. He was also chair of the Nokomis Union Hospital board. Hummel was defeated by Jacob Benson when he ran for reelection to the provincial assembly in 1938.

Hummel was named to the Saskatchewan Agricultural Hall of Fame in 1972.
