= Prairieland Park =

Events centre in Saskatchewan, Canada

Coordinates: 52°05′59″N 106°40′37″W

Saskatoon Prairieland Park Corporation
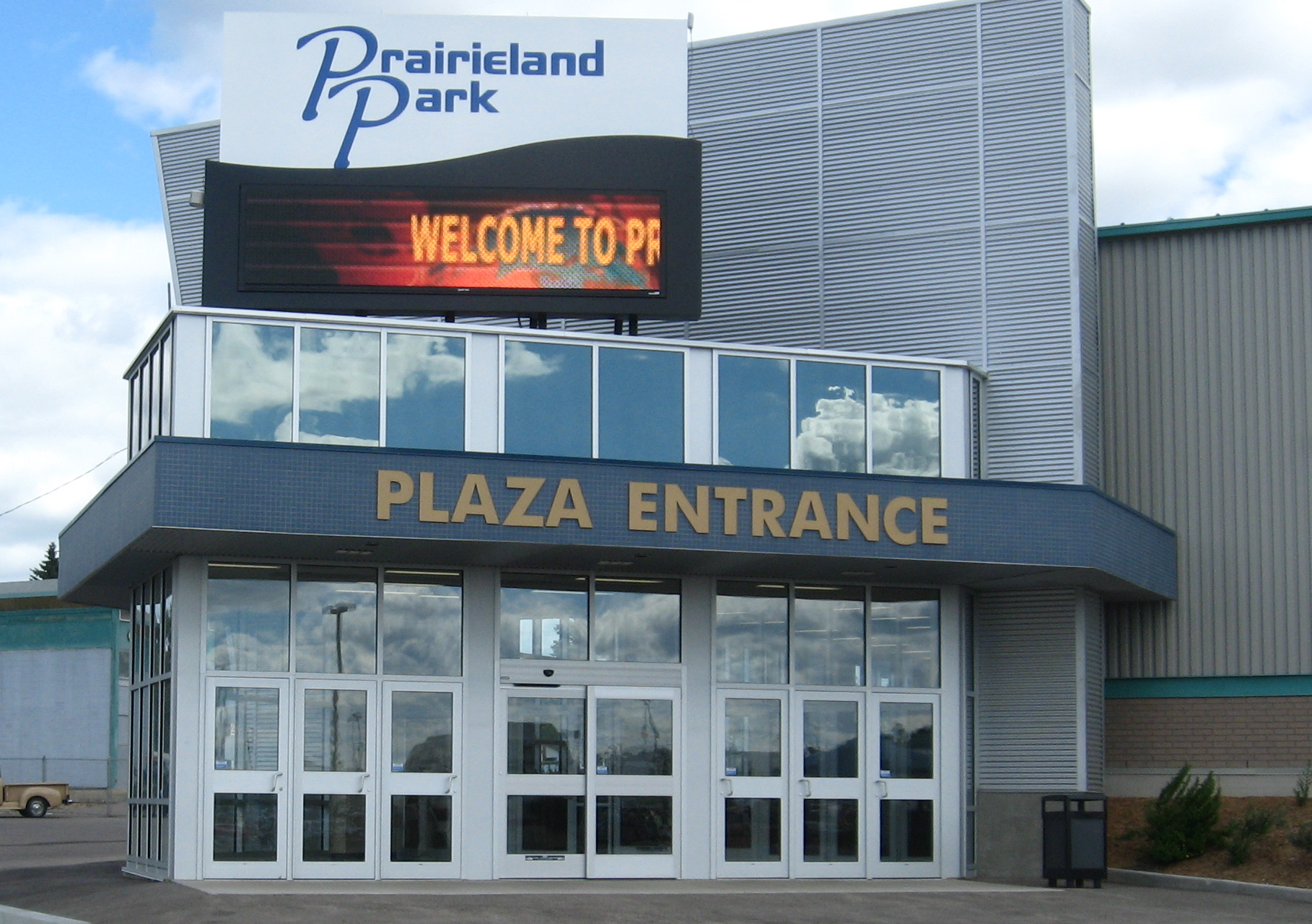
- Company type: Not for profit
- Industry: Fairs, trade fairs, agricultural shows
- Headquarters: 503 Ruth Street West, Saskatoon, SK, Canada
- Key people: Vic Dubois – President
- Products: Annual fair and exhibition space
- Number of employees: 75 (year round) – 300 (seasonal)
- Website: Prairieland Park

Prairieland Park is an events centre on the south-central edge of Saskatoon, Saskatchewan. The park is located in the Exhibition neighbourhood of Saskatoon. Each year the park hosts an annual Saskatoon Exhibition variably called "The EX" (previously it was known as Pioneer Days). During the remainder of the year most of the park venues are rented out to special events. Some events held are the Western Canadian Crop Production Show, Glow Saskatoon, Gardenscape, and the Prairieland Junior Ag Showcase.

The Agriculture Department is heavily involved in the community host 4H events.

It currently hosts over 400 events each year, which attracts 1.6 million people.

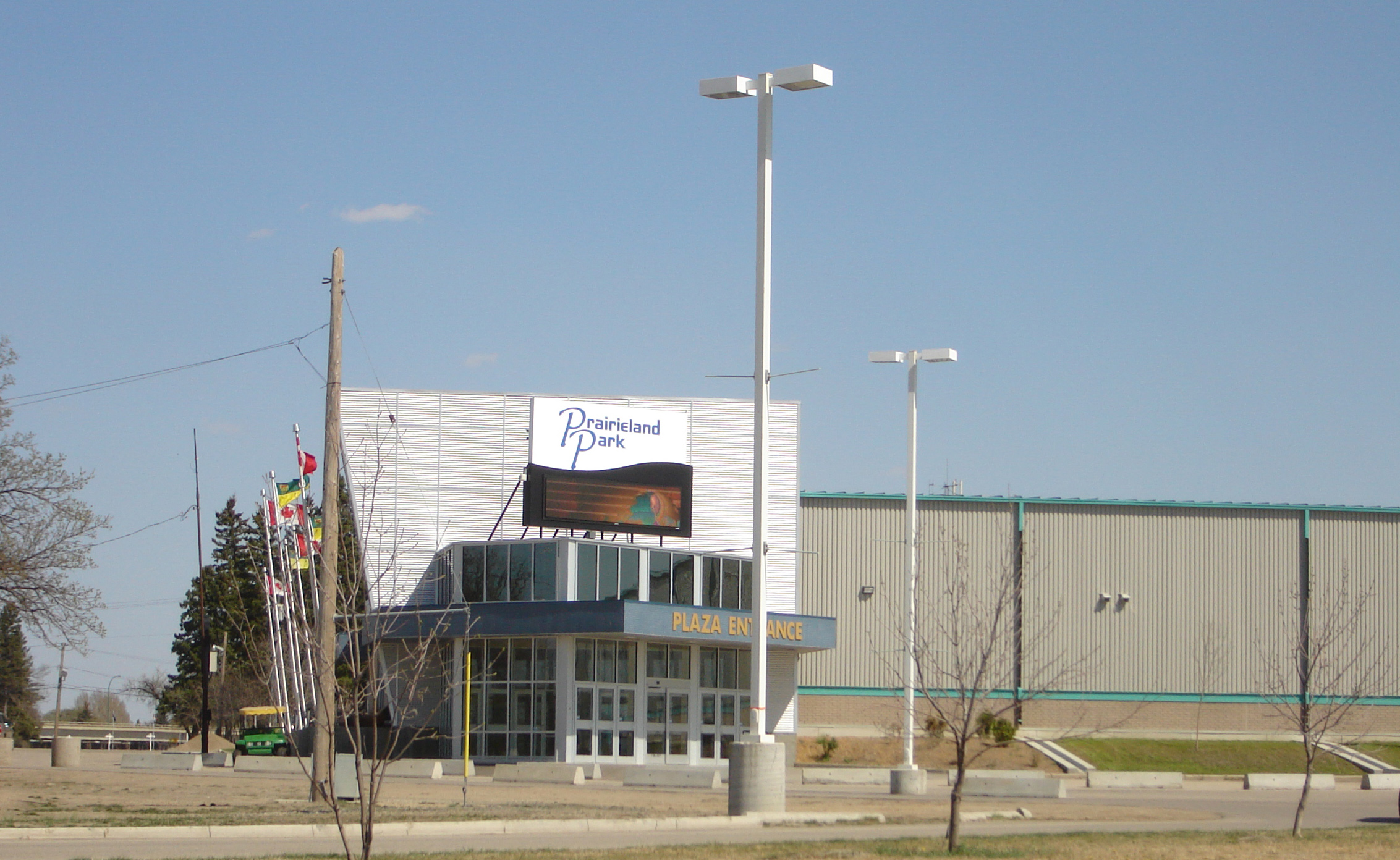
Prairieland Park

== The EX ==
The EX is an annual fair that occurs on the site each summer. This includes amusement rides, product exhibitions, music, shows and displays.

== History ==
The organization that became Prairieland Park dates back to 1886 when the earliest exhibition was held in the brand-new community of Saskatoon. The earliest exhibitions (prior to 1909) were held off 11th Street East on "Louise Grounds" in Nutana, currently occupied by Nutana Collegiate. Later, the Exhibition Grounds were purchased and over time a grandstand and exhibit buildings were constructed. This included the Jubilee Building, which opened in 1955 to commemorate the province's 50th anniversary. Other facilities included a covered outdoor theatre, a curling rink, an agricultural exhibits stadium, and in the 1970s two more exhibit buildings, Wheatland A and B. In 1972, the relocation of the Saskatchewan Western Development Museum from 11th Street West to a new facility just south of the Exhibition Grounds led to a period in which the WDM and the Exhibition worked in conjunction (resulting in WDM's own Pion-era exhibition merging with the Saskatoon Exhibition to form Pioneer Days). In addition, 1969 saw the opening of Marquis Downs, a thoroughbred racing facility; it too became linked to Pioneer Days/The EX.

In 2008 the park started a major $2.8 Million expansion to build 27.000-square-foot (2.5084 m^{2}) agriculture and equine centre plus an attached 45,000-square-foot (4,200 m^{2}) stabling facility for year-round use. By this time the Jubilee and Wheatland buildings had been demolished and had been replaced by a single Trade Centre; the renovations freed up the existing Trade Centre facility to be used exclusively for conventions and trade shows. Western Economic Diversification Canada and Saskatchewan Government's Ministry of Municipal Affairs under the Saskatoon Urban Development Agreement (UDA) are investing $2.8 million in the 20,000-square-foot (1,900 m^{2}) building expansion of Prairieland Park's Trade Centre.

== Marquis Downs ==
Marquis Downs was a horse race track in Saskatoon, Saskatchewan, Canada which featured both Thoroughbred and Standardbred horse racing. Principal races were the Prairie Lily Stakes, Saskatchewan Derby, and Saskatchewan Futurity. The minimum purse in 2007 was $3,000 and the Heritage races featured a $100,000 purse.

Marquis Downs closed in 2020 due to the COVID-19 pandemic and did not reopen; as of spring 2022 it was being repurposed as an indoor sports facility. Plans to build a 5,500-seat multi-purpose stadium on the site for a Canadian Premier League team and concerts were put on hold in 2023 due to rising costs.

== Buildings ==
The facility consists of the following buildings:

- World Trade Center Saskatoon at Prairieland Park
  - Hall A (37,000-square-foot exhibition area)
  - Hall B (two 16,000-square-foot (1,500 m^{2}) exhibition areas)
  - Hall C (18,000-square-foot exhibition space)
    - Terrace (located above hall C consists of an 8,000-square-foot (740 m^{2}) reception room)
  - Hall D (50,400-square-foot exhibition space)
  - Hall E (Opened in December 2006, with 58,000 square feet (5,400 m^{2}) exhibition space)
- Grand Stand
- Marquis Downs Building (undergoing repurposing as of 2022)

The Jubilee (Industry and Agriculture) Building (opened in 1955) was a former exhibition area that was demolished in 2006 to make room for Hall E. Other former buildings include the Saskatoon Stadium (agriculture and concert venue) that was demolished in the late 1980s; the Cascade Theatre outdoor stage (demolished as part of the Trade Centre construction), Wheatland A and B building (display and event facilities built in the 1970s and incorporated into the Trade Centre), the "Cory Corral" (small event and livestock space demolished in the 1980s). The Exhibition Curling Club building was converted into a casino in the early 1990s, and by the 2010s was a sports bar independent of the Exhibition. Although linked to Prairieland Park operations for many years after 1972, the Western Development Museum is no longer considered part of Prairieland Park.

== Access and amenities ==
Prairieland Parks is located south of Ruth Street between St. Henry and Lorne avenues, with major entrance points off Ruth and Lorne (the park's former entrance at Ruth and Lorne was closed to vehicular traffic in the 1980s). Access to the park was improved in 2013 with the completion of the southwest leg of the Circle Drive ring road. This has led to some additional tourist amenities such as hotel construction off Lorne Avenue.
