= Thomas Arnold Anderson =

Canadian politician

Thomas Arnold Anderson (October 21, 1871 – 1939) was a farmer and political figure in Saskatchewan. He represented Last Mountain in the Legislative Assembly of Saskatchewan from 1908 to 1912 as a Provincial Rights Party member.

He was born in Torbolton, Carleton County, Ontario (now Ottawa, Ontario), the son of John Anderson and Sarah Rebecca Arnold. In 1905, Anderson married Alice Gertrude Simpson. He lived in Earl Grey, Saskatchewan.
