= George Joseph Trapp =

Canadian politician

George Joseph Trapp (June 5, 1909 – November 25, 2002) was an educator and political figure in Saskatchewan. He represented Touchwood from 1964 to 1967 in the Legislative Assembly of Saskatchewan as a Liberal.

He was born in Kamsack, Saskatchewan, the son of Joseph Trapp and Caroline Slamp, and was educated in Lipton, at Luther College and at the Regina normal school. Trapp later earned a BEd from the University of Saskatchewan. In 1933, he married Bessie Stewart. Trapp taught school in Dysart and Cupar and was principal of the school in Punnichy for 21 years. He also served as president of the Saskatchewan Teachers’ Federation. During World War II, he served in the Army Reserve. In 1961, he was named to the Canadian College of Teachers. Trapp served in the provincial cabinet as Minister of Education. He was defeated by Frank Meakes when he ran for reelection in 1967. After leaving politics, he was director of continuing education for SaskPower until he retired in 1980.
