= George Maitland Atkinson =

Canadian politician

George Maitland Atkinson (November 14, 1860 – 1940) was a farmer and political figure in Saskatchewan. He represented Touchwood in the Legislative Assembly of Saskatchewan from 1908 to 1917 as a Liberal.

He was born in Delaware, Canada West, the son of the Reverend Thomas Atkinson and Rachel A. Johnson, and was educated at Manitoba College and Victoria University. He taught school for seven years in Ontario and in the North-West Territories. In 1887, Atkinson married Edith A. Cook. He lived near Wynot, Saskatchewan.
