= Samuel John Latta =

Canadian politician

Samuel John Latta (April 3, 1866 – April 22, 1946) was an educator, farmer, journalist and political figure in Saskatchewan. He represented Last Mountain from 1912 to 1929 as a Liberal.

He was born in London, Ontario, the son of John Latta and Eliza Barrell, and was educated at The Western University of London, Ontario (now the University of Western Ontario), the Ottawa Normal School and the Ontario School of Arts. He taught school in Ontario from 1883 to 1905 and authored Latta's Drawing Textbook which was used in Ontario schools for over fifty years. He married Agnes Annie Boyland in 1887. In 1905, Latta moved to Saskatchewan, settling on a homestead near Govan. He founded the weekly Govan Prairie News in 1907 and was editor until 1929. Latta was a member of the council for the rural municipality of Last Mountain Valley, also serving as secretary-treasurer.

He ran unsuccessfully for a seat in the provincial assembly in 1908 and then was elected in 1912. Latta served in the provincial cabinet as Minister of Highways and Minister of Education. He was defeated when he ran for reelection to the assembly in 1929.

After leaving politics, Latta worked as a writer and publicist until 1934, when he was named Commissioner of Libraries, Archives and Publications for the province. He served in the role until he retired in 1944. Latta died in Regina at the age of 80.
