= Tom Johnston (Saskatchewan politician) =

Canadian politician

Tom Johnston (June 19, 1881 – September 11, 1969) was an English-born farmer and political figure in Saskatchewan, Canada. He represented Touchwood in the Legislative Assembly of Saskatchewan from 1938 to 1956 as a member of the Co-operative Commonwealth Federation.

He was born in Birmingham and came to Manitoba in 1901, moving to Saskatchewan two years later. Johnston operated a farm near Cymric. He ran unsuccessfully for a seat in the provincial assembly in 1934 as a member of the Farmer-Labour Group (the CCF's predecessor) and was defeated in the federal riding of Prince Albert district in 1935. Johnston served as Speaker of the Legislative Assembly of Saskatchewan from 1944 to 1956. He died in Regina at the age of 88.

1935 Canadian federal election: Prince Albert
Party	Candidate	Votes	%	±%	Elected
Liberal	William Lyon Mackenzie King	9,087	54.67	+1.2	✓
Social Credit	Alexander Rupert Bedard	3,185	19.16		
Conservative	Tom Francis Graves	2,880	17.33	−29.2	
Co-operative Commonwealth	Tom Johnston	1,469	8.84		
Total valid votes		16,621	100.0		
Source(s) "Prince Albert, Saskatchewan (1908-09-17 - 1988-09-30)". History of Federal Ridings Since 1867. Library of Parliament.
