= 10th Saskatchewan Legislature =

The 10th Legislative Assembly of Saskatchewan was elected in the Saskatchewan general election held in June 1944. The assembly sat from October 19, 1944, to May 19, 1948. The Co-operative Commonwealth Federation (CCF) led by Tommy Douglas formed the government. The Liberal Party led by William John Patterson formed the official opposition.

Tom Johnston served as speaker for the assembly.

== Members of the Assembly ==
The following members were elected to the assembly in 1944:

Electoral district	Member	Party	First elected / previously elected	No.# of term(s)
Arm River	Gustaf Herman Danielson	Liberal	1934	3rd term
Athabasca	Louis Marcien Marion	Liberal	1944	1st term
Bengough	Allan Lister Samuel Brown	Co-operative Commonwealth	1944	1st term
Biggar	Woodrow Stanley Lloyd	Co-operative Commonwealth	1944	1st term
Cannington	William John Patterson	Liberal	1921	6th term
Canora	Myron Henry Feeley	Co-operative Commonwealth	1938	2nd term
Cumberland	Leslie Walter Lee	Co-operative Commonwealth	1944	1st term
Cut Knife	Isidore Charles Nollet	Co-operative Commonwealth	1944	1st term
Elrose	Maurice John Willis	Co-operative Commonwealth	1944	1st term
Gravelbourg	Henry Edmund Houze	Co-operative Commonwealth	1944	1st term
Gull Lake	Alvin Cecil Murray	Co-operative Commonwealth	1944	1st term
Hanley	James Smith Aitken	Co-operative Commonwealth	1944	1st term
Humboldt	Ben Putnam	Co-operative Commonwealth	1944	1st term
Kelvington	Peter Anton Howe	Co-operative Commonwealth	1938	2nd term
Kerrobert-Kindersley	John Wellbelove	Co-operative Commonwealth	1944	1st term
Kinistino	William James Boyle	Co-operative Commonwealth	1944	1st term
Last Mountain	Jacob Benson	Co-operative Commonwealth	1929, (Note: First elected as Progressive) 1938	3rd term*
Lumsden	William Sancho Thair	Co-operative Commonwealth	1944	1st term
Maple Creek	Beatrice Janet Trew	Co-operative Commonwealth	1944	1st term
Meadow Lake	Herschel Lee Howell	Co-operative Commonwealth	1944	1st term
Melfort	Oakland Woods Valleau	Co-operative Commonwealth	1938	2nd term
Melville	William James Arthurs	Co-operative Commonwealth	1944	1st term
Milestone	Frank Keem Malcolm	Co-operative Commonwealth	1944	1st term
Moose Jaw City	John Wesley Corman	Co-operative Commonwealth	1944	1st term
Moose Jaw City	Dempster Henry Ratcliffe Heming	Co-operative Commonwealth	1944	1st term
Moosomin	Arthur Thomas Procter	Liberal	1934	3rd term
Morse	Sidney Merlin Spidell	Co-operative Commonwealth	1944	1st term
Morse	James William Gibson (1946)	Co-operative Commonwealth	1946	1st term
Notukeu-Willow Bunch	Niles Leonard Buchanan	Co-operative Commonwealth	1944	1st term
Pelly	Dan Daniels	Co-operative Commonwealth	1944	1st term
Prince Albert	Lachlan Fraser McIntosh	Co-operative Commonwealth	1944	1st term
Qu'Appelle-Wolseley	Warden Burgess	Co-operative Commonwealth	1944	1st term
Redberry	Dmytro Matthew Lazorko	Co-operative Commonwealth	1944	1st term
Regina City	Charles Cromwell Williams	Co-operative Commonwealth	1944	1st term
Regina City	Clarence Melvin Fines	Co-operative Commonwealth	1944	1st term
Rosetown	John Taylor Douglas	Co-operative Commonwealth	1944	1st term
Rosthern	Peter J. Hooge	Liberal	1944	1st term
Saltcoats	Joseph Lee Phelps	Co-operative Commonwealth	1938	2nd term
Saskatoon City	John Henry Sturdy	Co-operative Commonwealth	1944	1st term
Saskatoon City	Arthur Thomas Stone	Co-operative Commonwealth	1944	1st term
Shellbrook	Albert Victor Sterling	Co-operative Commonwealth	1944	1st term
Shellbrook	Guy Franklin Van Eaton (1945)	Co-operative Commonwealth	1945	1st term
Souris-Estevan	Charles David Cuming	Co-operative Commonwealth	1944	1st term
Swift Current	Harry Gibbs	Co-operative Commonwealth	1944	1st term
The Battlefords	Alexander Duff Connon	Co-operative Commonwealth	1944	1st term
Tisdale	John Hewgill Brockelbank	Co-operative Commonwealth	1938	2nd term
Torch River	John Bruce Harris	Co-operative Commonwealth	1944	1st term
Touchwood	Tom Johnston	Co-operative Commonwealth	1938	2nd term
Turtleford	Bob Wooff	Co-operative Commonwealth	1944	1st term
Wadena	George Hara Williams	Co-operative Commonwealth	1934	3rd term
Wadena	Frederick Arthur Dewhurst (1945)	Co-operative Commonwealth	1945	1st term
Watrous	James Andrew Darling	Co-operative Commonwealth	1944	1st term
Weyburn	Thomas Clement Douglas	Co-operative Commonwealth	1944	1st term
Wilkie	Hans Ove Hansen	Co-operative Commonwealth	1944	1st term
Yorkton	Arthur Percy Swallow	Co-operative Commonwealth	1944	1st term
Active Service Voters (Note: Polled October 17 to 30, 1944)
Area No. 1 (Great Britain)	LAC Delmar Storey Valleau		1944	1st term
Area No. 2 (Mediterranean Sea)	Lt. Col. Alan Williams Embury		1944	1st term
Area No. 3 (Canada outside of Saskatchewan/Newfoundland)	Major Malcolm James Dobie		1944	1st term

== Party Standings ==
Affiliation	Members
Co-operative Commonwealth	47
Liberal	5
Active Service Voters (Note: Active Service Voter representatives had no party affiliation)	3
Total	55
Government Majority	42

== By-elections ==
By-elections were held to replace members for various reasons:

Electoral district	Member elected	Party	Election date	Reason
Shellbrook	Guy Franklin Van Eaton	Co-operative Commonwealth	June 29, 1945	AV Sterling died in 1944
Wadena	Frederick Arthur Dewhurst	Co-operative Commonwealth	November 21, 1945	GH Williams resigned due to ill health
Morse	James William Gibson	Co-operative Commonwealth	June 27, 1946	SM Spidell resigned seat
