= Politics of Saskatchewan =

- Coat of arms of Saskatchewan
- Polity type: Province within a federal parliamentary constitutional monarchy
- Constitution: Constitution of Canada

Legislative branch
- Name: Legislature: Legislative Assembly
- Type: Unicameral
- Meeting place: Saskatchewan Legislative Building, Regina
- Presiding officer: Speaker of the Legislative Assembly

Executive branch
- Head of state
- Currently: King Charles III represented by Bernadette McIntyre, Lieutenant Governor
- Head of government
- Currently: Premier; Scott Moe
- Appointer: Lieutenant Governor
- Cabinet
- Name: Executive Council
- Leader: Premier (as President of the Executive Council)
- Appointer: Lieutenant Governor
- Headquarters: Regina

Judicial branch
- Court of Appeal
- Chief judge: Robert G. Richards
- Seat: Regina
- Court of King's Bench
- Chief judge: Martel D. Popescul
- Provincial Court
- Chief judge: James Plemel

The Politics of Saskatchewan relate to the Canadian federal political system, along with the other Canadian provinces. Saskatchewan has a lieutenant-governor, who is the representative of the Crown in right of Saskatchewan; a premier—currently Scott Moe—leading the cabinet; and a legislative assembly. As of the most recent provincial election in 2024, the province is divided into 61 electoral districts, each of which elects a representative to the legislature, who becomes their member, or MLA. In 2024, Moe's Saskatchewan Party was elected to a majority government. Regina is the provincial capital.

As of the most recent federal election in 2021, Saskatchewan elects 14 members to Canada's 338-member Parliament.

Politics in Saskatchewan have historically been shaped by the province's heavily agricultural and mineral resource-based economy. Politics have also been influenced by an enduring sense of western alienation within Canadian politics, tying its political history in with its western Canadian counterparts in British Columbia, Manitoba, and especially neighbouring Alberta. The province still has a unique political history, and is notable for having elected the first social democratic government in Canada in 1944, when Tommy Douglas' Co-operative Commonwealth Federation (CCF) won its first of five consecutive majority governments. Under the CCF, the province pioneered universal medicare within Canada and was known for government ownership of key economic sectors. In the twenty-first century, politics in the province have been dominated by the conservative Saskatchewan Party and the federal Conservative Party.

== Legislature ==
The Legislative Assembly of Saskatchewan is the deliberative assembly of the Saskatchewan Legislature in the province of Saskatchewan, Canada. Bills passed by the assembly are given royal assent by the King in Right of Saskatchewan(represented by the Lieutenant Governor of Saskatchewan). The legislature meets at the Saskatchewan Legislative Building in Regina.

There are 61 constituencies in the province, which elect members of the Legislative Assembly (MLAs) to the Legislative Assembly. All are single-member districts, though the cities of Regina, Saskatoon and Moose Jaw have been represented by multi-member constituencies in the past.

The legislature has been unicameral since its establishment; there has never been a provincial upper house.

== Political history ==
=== From founding to the Great Depression ===
Saskatchewan entered Confederation on September 1, 1905, alongside Alberta, with both provinces being carved out of the North-West Territories. Territorial premier Frederick Haultain had advocated for the creation of one large western province, which he wanted to call Buffalo. However, the federal Liberal government under Wilfrid Laurier, wary of the potential power of a large western province, opted to create two provinces on the western Prairies instead. Moreover, as had been the case with Manitoba in 1870, the federal government withheld natural resource rights from the new provinces, instead paying grants to the provinces—a situation that remained a point of contention until the Natural Resource Transfer Acts gave Alberta and Saskatchewan their resource rights in 1930. Not happy with these developments, Haultain served as the leader of the Provincial Rights Party from 1905 until 1912 and vied to become Saskatchewan premier. The party had been the territorial Conservative Association, and would return to the Conservative name in 1912. Despite Haultain's efforts, the early political history of the province was dominated by the Liberal Party. Liberal Walter Scott was Premier from 1905 until 1916, and remains the second-longest tenured premier in Saskatchewan history.

The Liberals achieved their dominance through close associations with farmers, especially through the Saskatchewan Grain Growers' Association, and the large immigrant communities that were populating the Prairies in the early part of the twentieth century. Moreover, Saskatchewan Liberals positioned themselves to fill important roles in the federal Liberal cabinet; for example, premiers Charles Dunning and James Gardiner both became key cabinet members in William Lyon Mackenzie King's governments, including the latter as Minister of Agriculture. This reality staved off the impact of the Progressive Party movement, which with the United Farmer parties of several provinces, disrupted the Canada's two-party system and won power in both Alberta and Manitoba in the 1920s.

Before 1944, the only interruption in Liberal rule came after the 1929 election. Although the Liberals won the most seats with 28, they were short of a majority government. James T.M. Anderson, whose Conservatives won 24 seats, secured the support of the remaining members to form a coalition government, which was known as the "Co-operative" government. Anderson ran a largely nativist campaign, and was known to have been closely associated with the provincial branch of the Ku Klux Klan, which supported his election. Anderson became premier at the outset of the Great Depression, and conditions became so severe on the Prairies that not a single Conservative won a seat in the following election; in fact, only two Conservatives were elected again before 1975—one in a 1953 by-election and one in 1964.

=== The Depression and the CCF ===
The Prairies were ravaged by the Great Depression, where severe economic recession was joined by dust bowl conditions to create disastrous conditions. During the 1930s, which became known as the "Dirty Thirties" on the Prairies, approximately 14,000 farms were abandoned across the region, and Saskatchewan was by 1939 the most indebted province in the country. In 1935, the On-to-Ottawa Trek, an attempt by thousands of unemployed workers to make their way from western Canada to Ottawa, was violently stopped by the Royal Canadian Mounted Police in Regina.

The Co-operative Commonwealth Federation party emerged that decade as a populist socialist alternative, which was well-positioned to critique a political and economic system in crisis. The CCF was founded in Calgary in 1932, bringing together farmer, labour and socialist elements. The following year in Regina, the party adopted its platform, which became known as the Regina Manifesto. The party first fielded candidates in Saskatchewan in 1934 under the "Farmer-Labour" banner, and the party won the only five non-Liberal seats, to become the Opposition. Running as the CCF in 1938 Saskatchewan general election, the party doubled its seat count to 10.

The CCF achieved a breakthrough in the 1940s, just as the Second World War and other factors were easing Depression conditions. Tommy Douglas succeeded George Hara Williams—one of the CCF's founders with a background in the United Farmers of Canada—as CCF leader and led the party to a majority government. The CCF government was a more interventionist government and helped direct the province's economic development lay the foundation for a robust welfare state that ensured a universal standard of public services to residents. Under the CCF, the province created new crown corporations for insurance, transportation, utilities, and other services, while working to modernize the province through infrastructure development.

The party's crowning achievement was the institution of universal medicare in 1962. The CCF pitched the 1960 election as a referendum on medicare, and secured its fifth consecutive majority mandate. However, medicare still was controversial, especially among medical professionals, and the 1962 doctors' strike in response to medicare legislation threatened to stop its implementation. The strike lasted approximately three weeks before an amended medicare act was passed in August. This act laid the foundation for Canada's 1966 Medical Care Act, which expanded medicare nationwide—by then, Douglas had become the leader of the federal New Democratic Party, which held the balance of power in Lester Pearson's minority Liberal governments.

The postwar era brought about increasing urbanization in Saskatchewan as farms—formerly the foundational unit of the province since its inception—became larger and more capital-intensive, and many farmers sold their land and moved to cities. This process of rural decline would become a fixation of governments of all stripes in the years to come. In this period, while agriculture remained a major part of the provincial economy, mineral development took on a larger share of the economy.

=== Elections from 1905 to 1964 ===
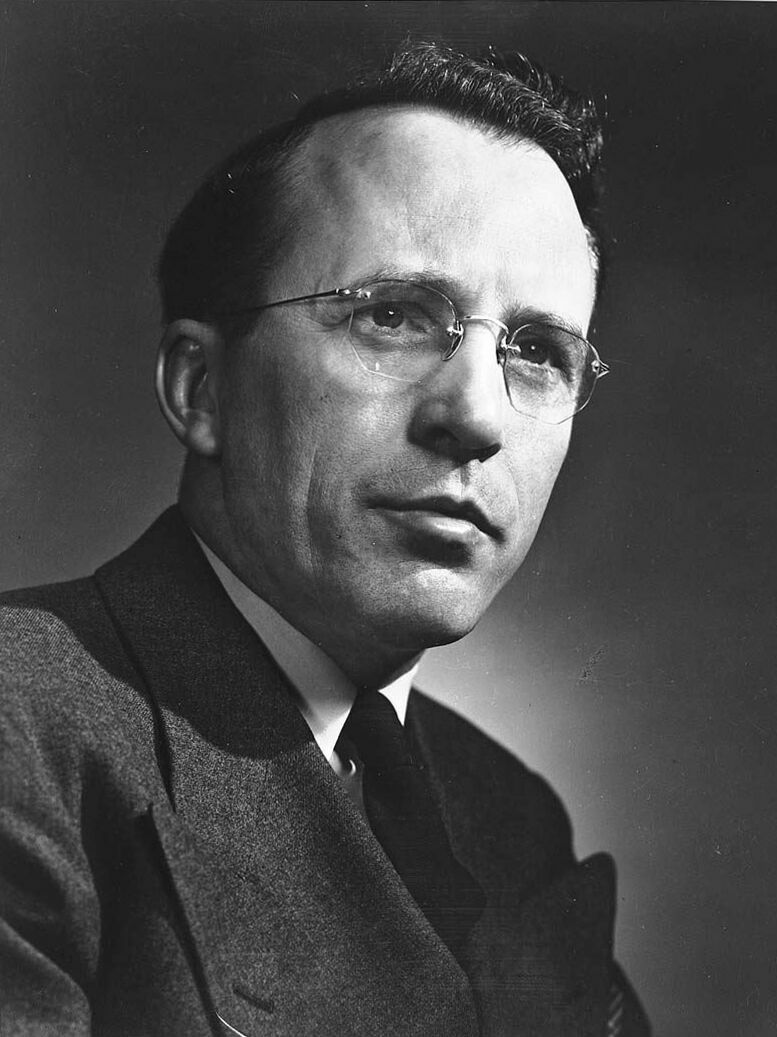
Tommy Douglas led the CCF in Saskatchewan from 1942 to 1962.

Elections to the Legislative Assembly of Saskatchewan (1905–1964) — seats won by party
Government	Liberal						"Co-op"^{[d]}	Liberal		CCF					Liberal
Party	1905	1908	1912	1917	1921	1925	1929	1934	1938	1944	1948	1952	1956	1960	1964
Liberal	16	27	45	51	45	50	28	50	38	5	19	11	14	17	32
Provincial Rights / Conservative / PC	9	14	8	7	2	3	24								1
Progressive					6	6	5								
Labour / Liberal-Labour					1	1									
Co-operative Commonwealth Federation								5	10	47	31	42	36	37	25
Social Credit									2				3		
Unity (Communist)									2						
Soldiers' vote^{[a]}				3											
Independent^{[b]}				1	9	3	6				1				
Liberal-PC^{[c]}											1				
Total	25	41	53	62	63	63	63	55	52	52	52	53	53	54	58

==== Notes ====
^{a} In 1917, three MLAs were elected to represent Saskatchewan residents serving overseas in Belgium, France, and England during the First World War.
^{b} The Independent label includes candidates who ran with affiliations to parties. An "Independent Conservative" and an "Independent Pro-Government" were both elected in 1921, while an "Independent Liberal" was elected in 1925.
^{c} In 1948, Alex H. McDonald was jointly nominated by the Liberal and Progressive Conservative parties as an anti-CCF candidate; upon election, McDonald joined the Liberal caucus, and he remained a Liberal candidate in future elections.
^{d} The 1929 election resulted in a coalition government when the Liberals, who were short of a majority, failed to secure the confidence of the Legislature. The Conservative Party won the second most seats and were supported by Progressive and Independent MLAs to form what was termed the "Co-operative government", with Conservative leader J.T.M. Anderson as Premier.

=== Shifting divides: 1960s to the 1990s ===
After five straight electoral victories and a drawn out, bitter dispute over the implementation of medicare, the CCF, now under the leadership of Woodrow Lloyd, lost the 1964 election to Ross Thatcher's Liberals. The Liberals presented themselves as a free enterprise alternative to the socialist CCF. Although Thatcher, who had started his own political career with the CCF, railed against socialism—frequently equating it with communism—his Liberals proved unable to overturn medicare, although they did introduce limited user fees. They also downsized what they labeled a bloated civil service, and during this period, the province saw many of its civil servants join the federal civil service as Pearson's government expanded the federal welfare state. Those civil servants became known as the "Saskatchewan Mafia". Several were also recruited by Louis Robichaud to join the New Brunswick civil service.

The New Democratic Party—the successor to the CCF after it merged with the Canadian Labour Congress—returned to power in 1971 under the leadership of Allan Blakeney. The NDP promised a "New Deal for People": a revitalization of central planning and a further expansion of the welfare state. Blakeney, a former civil servant in Douglas' government, was particularly concerned with questions of equality. The NDP would win three consecutive elections under Blakeney in an era that was marked by the 1970s energy crisis and a resurgence of western alienation. With commodity prices soaring in the 1970s, Saskatchewan created a number of new crown corporations, such as the Saskatchewan Mining Development Corporation, SaskOil, and PotashCorp, to help the province capture windfall profits from resource development. The NDP also created an Environment Department and drafted environmental assessment legislation. Blakeney also played a key role alongside Alberta's Progressive Conservative premier Peter Lougheed in challenging federal encroachment on provincial resource rights, which was epitomized by the 1980 National Energy Program, instituted by Pierre Trudeau's Liberals. Blakeney and Lougheed ensured that provincial resource rights were enshrined in the patriated Canadian Constitution in 1982, and Blakeney helped to craft the notwithstanding clause.

The 1970s also saw the re-building of the Conservatives—by then the Progressive Conservatives—into a political force. Under the leadership of Dick Collver, the party returned to the legislature with seven members in 1975, and won the second most seats in 1978, when the Liberals were shut out of the legislature for the first time ever. The PCs surged to power in 1982 under the leadership of Grant Devine, whose campaign focused largely on rural issues, exposing a rapidly growing divide between city and country.

According to historian Bill Waiser, the Devine years marked a profound shift in Saskatchewan political divides. For more than a generation, the province appeared to be ideologically divided between proponents of democratic socialism and free-enterprise capitalism—these are the lines along which political campaigns were waged. Devine participated in this approach too, proclaiming that Saskatchewan was "open for business", but his time in office—and his fixation on championing agriculture at all costs—marked a shift towards another divide: that between urban and rural. Political analyst Dale Eisler has written similarly that Saskatchewan politics can be grouped into distinct "Before Devine" and "After Devine" categories.

Devine's government determined to cater to rural interests, and it spent lavishly in building infrastructure and new programs for farmers especially. It achieved this in part through drawing on a relationship with Brian Mulroney's Progressive Conservatives, which formed a majority government in Ottawa in 1984. The PCs also wracked up large deficits, and, particularly after securing a second majority in 1986—despite losing the popular vote to the NDP—embarked on a privatization campaign, targeting crown corporations like PotashCorp and SaskOil, eliminating significant sources of government revenue. The Opposition managed to stop the attempted privatization of SaskEnergy, which slowed the privatization agenda. Commodity prices also dipped in the 1980s, further straining provincial finances. By the end of the decade, Saskatchewan was deeply in debt. Devine's government, which had inherited balanced finances, had added approximately $1 billion per year to the provincial debt, and when the PCs were swept from power in 1991, the debt stood at $12 billion and the province was on the brink of bankruptcy.

By 1995, it was also revealed that the PC government was implicated in one of the biggest fraud scandals in Canadian political history. Between 1987 and 1991, members of the government had defrauded the province of over $800,000 through false expense claims. An RCMP investigation ultimately led to 16 fraud convictions, including several MLAs and former cabinet ministers, many of them serving jail time. Devine was not found to be directly connected to the scandal.

The NDP returned to power in 1991 under the leadership of Blakeney's former attorney general, Roy Romanow. The new government's biggest priority was avoiding provincial insolvency. Over the next several years, the NDP cut spending drastically to balance its finances, now lacking some of the biggest revenue generators of the previous NDP government, like PotashCorp. This effort included a reduction in rural health services involving the conversion or closure of 52 health centres, a decision that only further solidified perceptions of an urban and rural divide in the province. The cuts were divisive even within the NDP as large sections of the party felt this turn to neoliberal austerity, or "third way" politics, betrayed the NDP tradition of claiming public revenue and investing in public ownership. However, Romanow's government did balance finances by 1995, much sooner than expected.

=== Elections from 1967 to present ===
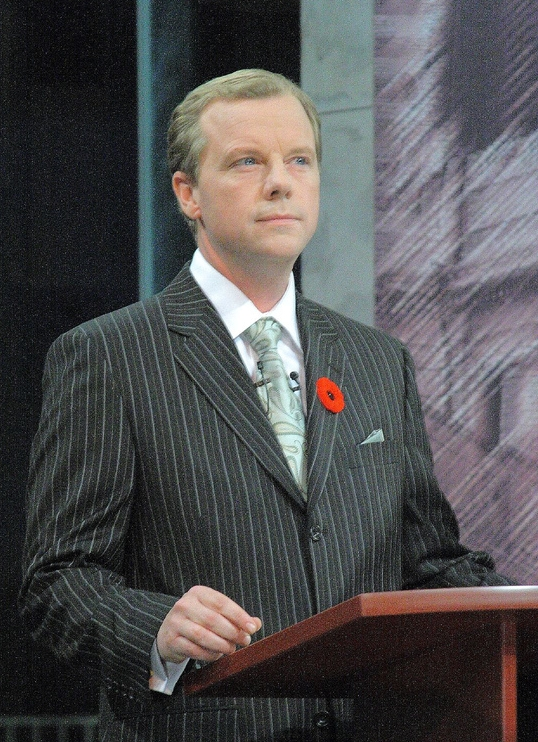
Brad Wall led the Saskatchewan Party from 2004 to 2018.

Elections to the Legislative Assembly of Saskatchewan (1967–2024) — seats won by party
Government	Liberal	NDP			PC		NDP				Saskatchewan				
Party	1967	1971	1975	1978	1982	1986	1991	1995	1999	2003	2007	2011	2016	2020	2024
Liberal / Progress^{[a]}	35	15	15			1	1	11	3						
New Democratic^{[b]}	24	45	39	44	9	25	55	42	29	30	20	9	10	13	27
Progressive Conservative			7	17	55	38	10	5							
Saskatchewan									26	28	38	49	51	48	34
Total	59	60	61	61	64	64	66	58	58	58	58	58	61	61	61

==== Notes ====
^{a} The Liberal party rebranded itself as the Saskatchewan Progress Party in 2023.
^{b} The CCF merged with the Canadian Labour Congress and re-branded as the New Democratic Party. Candidates ran as NDP-CCF in 1964, and NDP thereafter.

=== At the turn of the century ===
The Progressive Conservatives were badly damaged by the expense fraud scandal. The party, now under the leadership of Bill Boyd, lost nearly half of its vote share in the 1995 election compared to 1991, and was reduced to five MLAs. The main beneficiary were the Liberals under Lynda Haverstock—the party had seen just two members elected between 1975 and 1991, but became the Official Opposition in 1995 with 11 MLAs. Neither party saw a clear path to challenge the NDP. This situation led to the foundation of a new right-wing party in 1997. Boyd and three other PC MLAs joined a coalition with four Liberal MLAs—all representing rural districts—to form the Saskatchewan Party, which was envisioned as a united alternative to the governing NDP. With eight MLAs, the party immediately took Opposition status from the Liberals. For PC members, the new party provided an opportunity to distance themselves from the expense fraud scandal as well as the struggling federal PCs; in fact, the Saskatchewan PCs effectively went dormant, running only paper candidates in the 1999 election. For their part, the Liberals persisted and had three members elected in 1999, which gave them the balance of power in a minority NDP government. That minority was a result of a strong Saskatchewan Party (SP) performance in rural districts, as the new party managed to win just one urban seat in an election that firmly established it as the Opposition.

The SP's first leader was former Reform Party Member of Parliament and House Leader Elwin Hermanson. Under Hermanson, the party adopted a number of socially conservative policies that betrayed its supposed centrist position, including work-for-welfare policies, an openness to referendums on publicly funded abortions, and "boot camp" correctional sentences. Such policies, the inability of the SP to appeal to urban voters, and accusations that the SP would privatize crown corporations—Hermanson admitted that he intended to restructure them—kept the party out of power in 2003. The NDP, now led by Lorne Calvert after Romanow's retirement, secured a narrow majority government. Notably, for the first time ever, neither the Liberals nor the PCs were represented in the legislature, which was now dominated by two "homegrown" parties. Rapidly-rising resource prices at the time kicked off a renewed boom in the provincial economy.

Hermanson resigned as SP leader in the wake of the election loss, and the party acclaimed Brad Wall as its new leader in 2004. Wall, who had worked as a ministerial assistant in the Devine government, undertook a review to scale back the party's social conservative policies and focused intently on economic policy, including avoiding any discussions of privatizing crown corporations. The more moderate approach worked—Wall led the Saskatchewan Party to a majority government in 2007. The Sask Party would win a fifth consecutive term in 2024, under Scott Moe.

== Contemporary politics ==
=== Political dominance ===
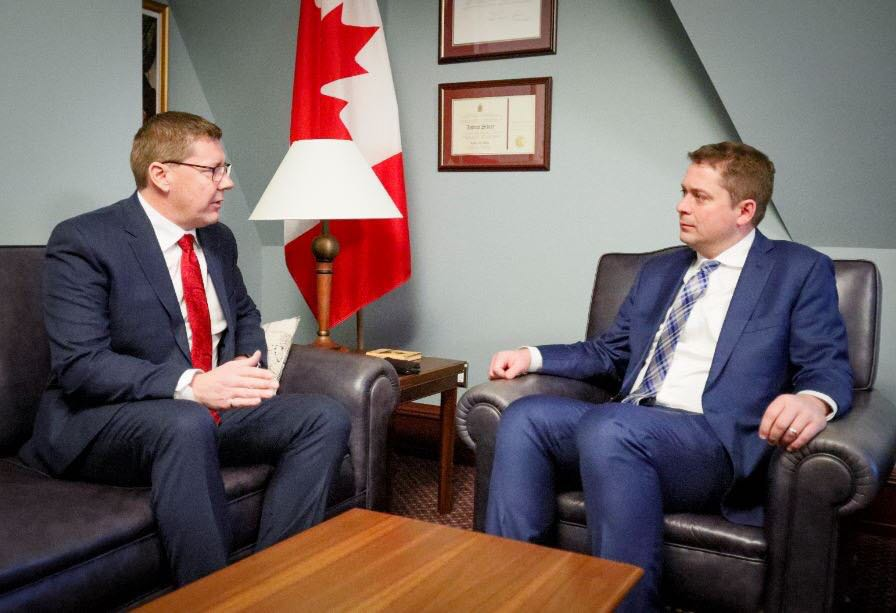
Scott Moe meeting with federal Opposition leader Andrew Scheer in 2019.

Although six other parties have contested general elections in Saskatchewan in the twenty first century, only the Saskatchewan Party and the New Democratic Party have had members elected to the legislature, signalling a solidification of a two-party system. However, NDP support fell after the Saskatchewan Party was first elected in 2007; the party had just nine members elected in 2011, ten in 2016, and thirteen in 2020. Moreover, the party struggled with consistent leadership. After Lorne Calvert's retirement, subsequent leaders Dwain Lingenfelter and Cam Broten both failed to win their own seats in their first elections as leader. Ryan Meili, who became leader in 2018, fared slightly better, but resigned in 2022.

This situation has meant that the Saskatchewan Party has enjoyed a run of electoral success not seen in the province since the days of the CCF. In 2024, the SP won its fifth consecutive majority government, a span over which the party won more than 60% of the popular vote three times. However, the 2024 election saw the party lose fourteen seats to a resurgent NDP under the leadership of Carla Beck, the first woman to lead the party. This signalled the Saskatchewan Party's biggest decline in support since first forming government.

Brad Wall became premier at a time of soaring commodity prices, which correspondingly raised revenues, and Wall and his party staked out a position as staunch promoters of the province's resource-based industries, especially potash and oil and gas; however, this promotion prioritized the private sector, a key distinction from past NDP governments. Wall rose to national prominence in 2010 when he successfully opposed a hostile takeover of Saskatoon-based PotashCorp by Australian mining giant BHP. However, after resource prices decreased sharply beginning in 2014, the province faced economic challenges. The province's 2017 budget, which was the sixth deficit in ten SP budgets to that point, was deeply unpopular due to its austerity measures. That unpopularity was a significant factor in Wall's decision to retire later that year. He was replaced in 2018 by Scott Moe.

Another outcome of the Saskatchewan Party's approach to resource development—especially fossil fuel development—has been persistent clashes with the federal government, particularly since the election of the Liberals under Justin Trudeau in 2015. Saskatchewan has emerged as a vocal opponent to federal efforts to address climate change and regulate environmental impacts. The province refused to join the Pan-Canadian Framework on climate change and has taken the federal government to court over several policies, including the federal carbon tax. Moe has been adamant that this opposition represents a new wave of western alienation, and Saskatchewan Party rhetoric consequently focuses largely on national politics.

Under Moe's leadership, the Saskatchewan Party has been characterized as moving further to the right, in part to combat new conservative parties like the separatist Buffalo Party and the Saskatchewan United Party—both of those parties have claimed second place in rural elections and by-elections. This rightward shift has been accelerated in the wake of the COVID-19 pandemic, which has been noted for increasing political polarization in Saskatchewan and elsewhere. In 2021, former SP MLA Nadine Wilson resigned from the caucus, and in 2022 became the leader of the new Saskatchewan United Party, which focused largely on opposing pandemic-related public health measures.

In 2023, the Liberal Party, having elected no candidates since 1999, changed its name to the Saskatchewan Progress Party.

== Federal politics ==
For much of its history, federal politics have aligned relatively closely with provincial politics in Saskatchewan. Into the 1940s, the province tended to elect Liberal members to federal Parliament, at the same time as the provincial Liberals dominated the province. In 1945, 18 of the province's 21 seats went to the CCF—18 of the 28 seats the party won in the election—which was led by former Saskatchewan CCF leader M.J. Coldwell. The province largely supported the CCF into the late 1950s, when this pattern weakened.

=== Diefenbaker's influence ===
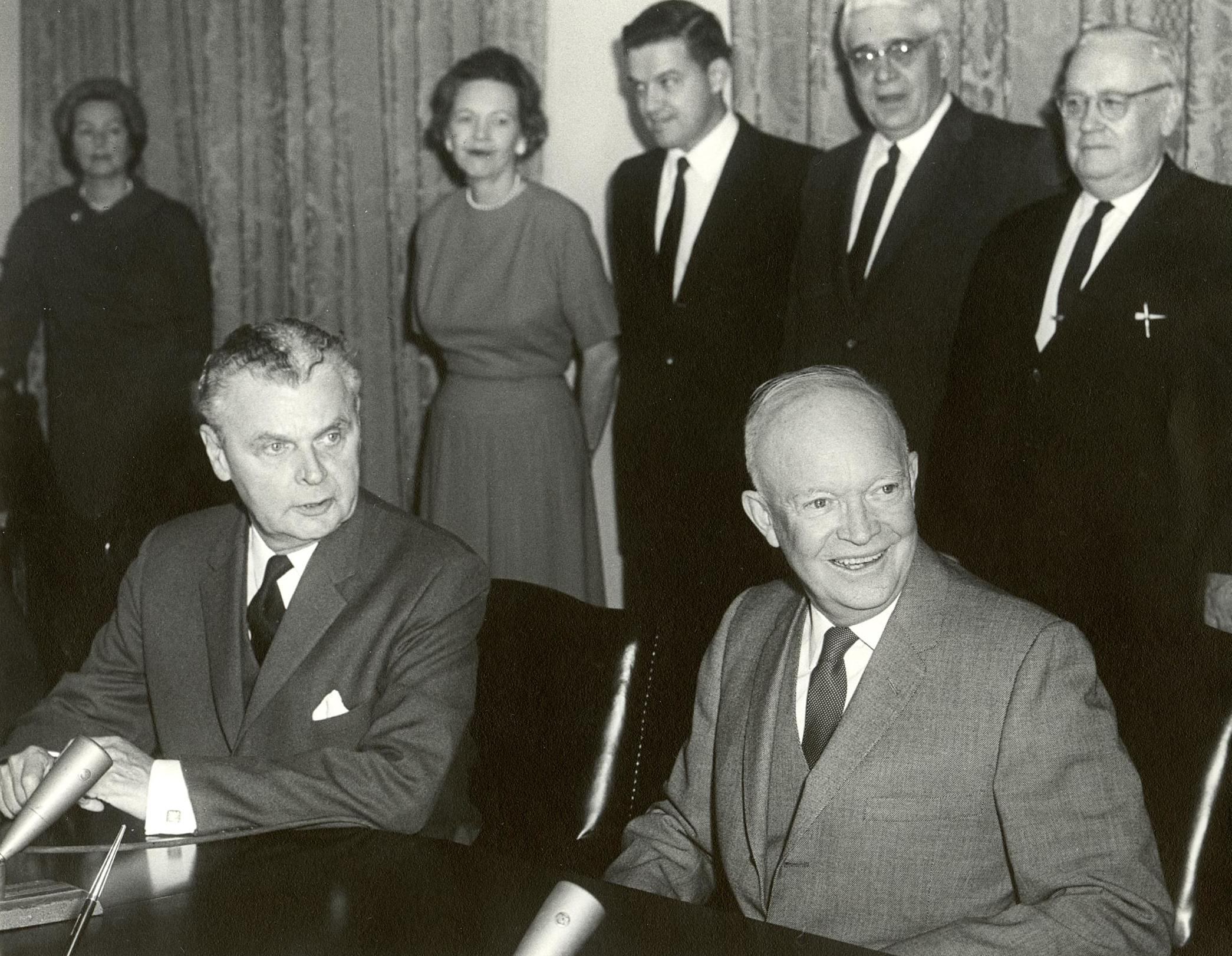
John Diefenbaker (front left) seated next to US President Dwight Eisenhower in 1961.

Saskatchewan's John Diefenbaker, one time leader of the provincial Progressive Conservatives, became the national PC leader in 1956. Diefenbaker was considered an unabashed champion of western Canada, and his populist style and moderate conservatism helped to shift Saskatchewan towards supporting the PCs nationally at a time when the CCF still dominated provincial politics. This included PC sweeps of Saskatchewan seats in the 1963 and 1965 federal elections after having all but one Saskatchewan seat in 1962. PC support was so extensive that when Tommy Douglas became leader of the federal NDP, he lost his first election bid in Regina in 1962; he was ultimately elected MP in a British Columbia riding. Diefenbaker was thus the first federal politician to break dominant trends in the province. His time in office included ushering in the Canadian Bill of Rights—he had begun drafts as early as the 1930s, and the passage of the Saskatchewan Bill of Rights by the CCF in 1947 helped to provide a legal precedent.

In 1988, when Grant Devine's PCs enjoyed a majority in Saskatchewan, the province elected mostly NDP MPs. That party remained competitive in the province throughout the 1980s and 1990s, contrasting with the dominance of the western Reform Party in BC and Alberta at the time. However, this changed at the turn of the century. The Canadian Alliance—the rebranded Reform Party—won the majority of Saskatchewan seats in 2000, and the new Conservative Party—created through a merger between the Alliance and the PCs—has dominated the province since then, including sweeping all Saskatchewan seats in the 2019 and 2021 federal elections. As such, Saskatchewan's federal politics have once again aligned closely with provincial results. This reflects the success of the Conservatives and the Saskatchewan Party in framing the federal government as hostile to the province's economic interests. It also reflects that Saskatchewan riding boundaries have often been characterized by mixed urban and rural ridings, with changes to those boundaries being highly politicized.

=== National figures ===
Aside from Coldwell, Douglas, and Diefenbaker, the only other Saskatchewan politician to lead a federal party was Regina's Andrew Scheer, who led the Conservative Party—and the Official Opposition—from 2017 to 2020. Scheer announced his resignation as leader in the wake of the 2019 election. However, William Lyon Mackenzie King, Canada's longest serving prime minister, represented the Saskatchewan riding of Prince Albert from 1926 to 1945—the same riding that Diefenbaker would later represent from 1953 to 1979. This was partly a political arrangement for the Ontario politician after he lost his seat in North York in the 1925 election; MP Charles McDonald resigned his Prince Albert seat so that King could return to Parliament. The decision also reflected the importance with which King considered the Prairie west and the affection he felt for the region. King gave prominent cabinet roles to two former Saskatchewan Liberal premiers in Charles Dunning and Jimmy Gardiner. The arrangement also helped lead to the establishment of the province's first national park, Prince Albert National Park, in 1927.

=== Federal elections from 1908 to 1965 ===
Elections to the Parliament of Canada from Saskatchewan (1908–1965) — seats won by party
Party	1908	1911	1917	1921	1925	1926	1930	1935	1940	1945	1949	1953	1957	1958	1962	1963	1965
Liberal	9	9		1	15	16	12	16	12	2	14	5	4		1		
Conservative / PC	1	1					7	1	2^{[b]}	1	1	1	3	16	16	17	17
Unionist			16														
Progressive				15	6	4	2										
CCF / NDP								2	5	18	5	11	10	1			
Social Credit								2									
Unity / United (Communist)									2								
Liberal-Progressive^{[a]}						1											
Total	10	10	16	16	21	21	21	21	21	21	20	17	17	17	17	17	17

==== Notes ====
^{a} Some Progressive candidates ran in support of the Liberal government after 1921.
^{b} In 1940, the Conservatives largely ran as "National Government" candidates in the wartime context; Saskatchewan elected two National Government candidates.

=== Federal elections from 1968 to 2021 ===
Elections to the Parliament of Canada from Saskatchewan (1968–2021) — seats won by party
Party	1968	1972	1974	1979	1980	1984	1988	1993	1997	2000	2004	2006	2008	2011	2015	2019	2021
Liberal	2	1	3					5	1	2	1	2	1	1	1		
PC	5	7	8	10	7	9	4										
NDP	6	5	2	4	7	5	10	5	5	2					3		
Reform / Alliance								4	8	10							
Conservative											13	12	13	13	10	14	14
Total	13	13	13	14	14	14	14	14	14	14	14	14	14	14	14	14	14

== Aboriginal politics ==
Saskatchewan, when compared to other provinces, has a large Aboriginal population. As of the 2006 Canadian census, residents identifying as First Nations, Métis, or Inuit comprised 14.8% of the overall population. Unlike neighbouring Alberta, Saskatchewan does not have land set aside as Métis Settlements (see Métis in Alberta).

Saskatchewan also has a rich history of Aboriginal political leaders of national prominence. First Nations leaders include Walter Dieter, Noel Starblanket, and the highly controversial David Ahenakew. First Nations are represented in the Federation of Sovereign Indigenous Nations. In addition, each First Nation has its own government band structure. The majority of Saskatchewan First Nations are Cree although Saulteaux, Assiniboine, Dakota, and Dene bands predominate in some areas.

Métis leaders of national importance include Malcolm Norris, Jim Sinclair and Clément Chartier. Métis people in the province take part in the Métis Nation - Saskatchewan. The Métis nation is represented on the community level by Métis Locals, structured similarly to trade union locals.

In 1982 the Aboriginal People's Party ran ten electoral candidates for the provincial legislature but received little support.

== Municipal politics ==
On the municipal level, non-Indian reserve, or non-Crown Land, in Saskatchewan is divided into rural municipalities and urban municipalities. Rural Municipalities have a corporate structure for dealing with larger governments known as SARM: the Saskatchewan Association of Rural Municipalities. Unlike neighbouring Alberta, Saskatchewan does not have Municipal Districts.

== See also ==
- History of Saskatchewan
- List of Saskatchewan general elections
- List of political parties in Saskatchewan
- List of premiers of Saskatchewan
- First Nations in Saskatchewan
- Politics of Canada
- Political culture of Canada
- Council of the Federation

== Bibliography ==
- Brennan, J. William. "Building the Co-operative Commonwealth": Essays on the Democratic Socialist Tradition in Canada. Regina: Canadian Plains Research Centre, 1985. ISBN 0-88977-031-X
- Eisler, Dale. From Left to Right: Saskatchewan's Political and Economic Transformation. Regina: University of Regina Press, 2022. ISBN 9780889778672
- Pitsula, James M. and Ken Rasmussen. Privatizing a Province: The New Right in Saskatchewan. Vancouver: New Star Books, 1990. ISBN 9780921586098
- Waiser, Bill. Saskatchewan: A New History. Calgary: Fifth House, 2005. ISBN 1-894856-43-0
