= 1944 Saskatchewan general election =

Canadian provincial election

- June 15, 1944

52 seats in the Legislative Assembly of Saskatchewan 27 seats needed for a majority
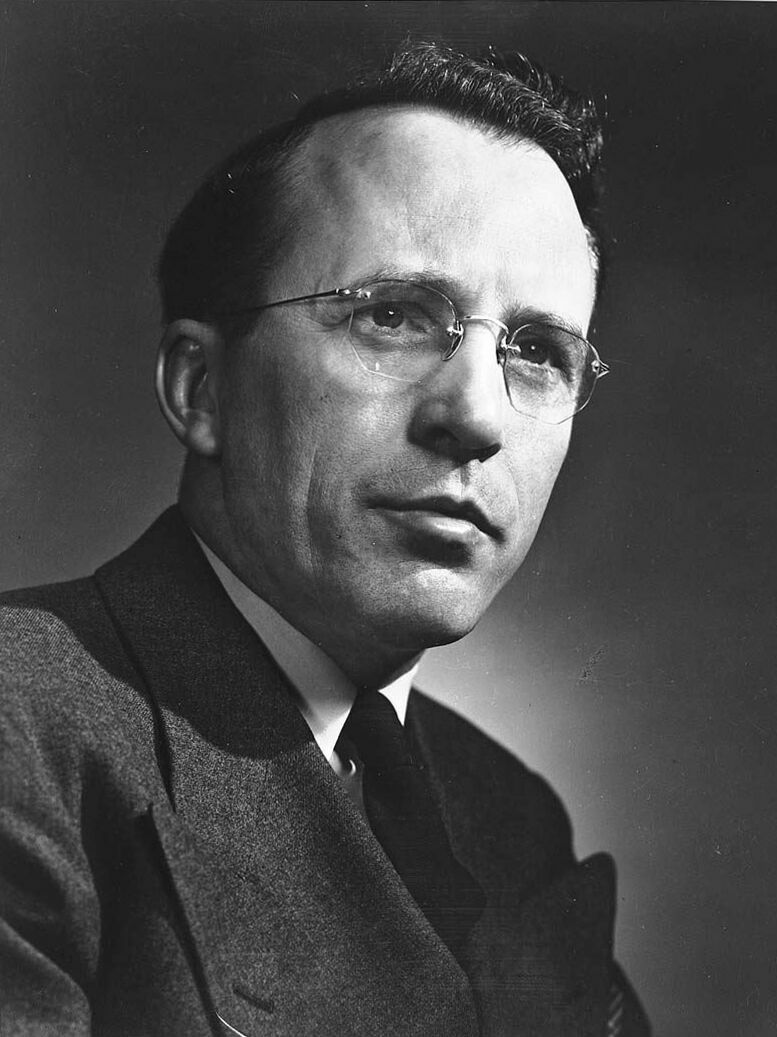

	First party	Second party	Third party
			PC
Leader	Tommy Douglas	William John Patterson	Rupert Ramsay
Party	Co-operative Commonwealth	Liberal	Progressive Conservative
Leader since	July 17, 1942	1935	February 15, 1944
Leader's seat	Weyburn	Cannington	Ran in Saskatoon City (lost)
Last election	10	38	0
Seats won	47	5	0
Seat change	▲37	▼33	±0
Popular vote	211,364	140,901	42,511
Percentage	53.13%	35.42%	10.69%
Swing	▲34.4pp	▼10.03pp	▼1.18pp
	Fourth party	Fifth party
Leader	—	Joseph Needham
Party	Labor-Progressive	Social Credit
Leader since	—	1935
Leader's seat	—	Did not run
Last election	2	2
Seats won	0	0
Seat change	▼2	▼2
Popular vote	2,067	249
Percentage	0.52%	0.06%
Swing	▼1.41pp	▼15.84pp
Premier before election
William John Patterson
Liberal
Premier after election
Tommy Douglas
Co-operative Commonwealth

The 1944 Saskatchewan general election, the tenth in the history of the province, was held on June 15, 1944 to elect members of the Legislative Assembly of Saskatchewan. The Co-operative Commonwealth Federation, under the leadership of Tommy Douglas, was elected to a majority government.

== Summary ==
The 1944 election was held six years after the previous election in 1938. While there is normally a five-year limit on the lifespan of Parliaments and provincial assemblies in Canada, the emergency brought on by the Second World War allowed the government to delay the election temporarily, which William Patterson's governing Liberal Party opted to do.

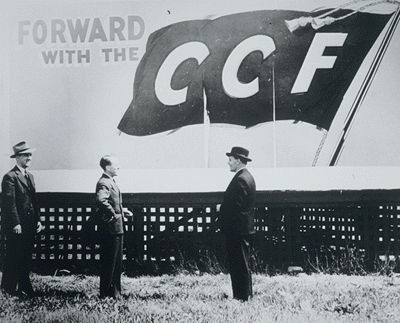
Douglas standing under a CCF election billboard with C.M. Fines and Clarence Gillis shortly after winning the election.

The 1944 election marked the first time a nominally socialist government was elected anywhere in Canada. With the victory, Co-operative Commonwealth Federation (CCF) leader Tommy Douglas became the premier of Saskatchewan. The CCF, which had spent two terms as the Official Opposition, won 47 of the 52 seats in the legislature, and over half the popular vote.

The Liberals, led by Patterson, had run a negative campaign, accusing Douglas and the CCF of being communists. The Liberal popular vote fell by 10 percentage points, and the party won only five seats. This marked the worst defeat of a sitting government in Saskatchewan's history.

The Social Credit Party, which had won 16% of the vote and two seats in the 1938 election, collapsed; the party had only one candidate, who received only 249 votes.

The Communist Party-led Unity movement reverted to the name Labor-Progressive Party, and lost both of the seats it had won in 1938.

The Conservative Party, renamed the Progressive Conservative Party and led by Rupert Ramsay, continued to see its share of the vote drop, taking only just over 10% of the vote, and won no seats.

An at-large service vote was held for Saskatchewan residents in the Canadian armed services fighting during the war. This special vote elected three nonpartisan members to represent Saskatchewan soldiers, sailors and airmen stationed in Great Britain, the Mediterranean region, and Newfoundland and Canada outside the province. Alberta had a similar system during the war.

== Results ==
Party	Party leader	# of candidates	Seats				Popular vote		
Party	Party leader	# of candidates	1938	Dissol.	Elected	% Change	#	%	% Change
Co-operative Commonwealth	Tommy Douglas	52	10	11	47	+327.3%	211,364	53.13%	+34.4%
Liberal	William Patterson	52	38	37	5	-86.5%	140,901	35.42%	-10.03%
Progressive Conservative	Rupert Ramsay	39	–	–	–	–	42,511	10.69%	-1.18%
Labor-Progressive		3	2	2	–	–	2,067	0.52%	-1.41%
Independent		5	–	–	–	–	705	0.18%	-0.73%
Social Credit	Joseph J. Needham (default)	1	2	2	–	–	249	0.06%	-15.84%
Independent Liberal		1	*	*	–	*	5	0.00%	*
Total		153	52	52	52	–	397,802	100%	
Source: Elections Saskatchewan

Note: * Party did not nominate candidates in previous election.

=== Percentages ===
Popular vote
CCF	53.13%
Liberal	35.42%
PC	10.69%
Others	0.76%

Seats summary
CCF	90.38%
Liberal	9.62%

=== Ranking ===
Party	Seats	Second	Third	Fourth	Fifth
Co-operative Commonwealth	47	4	1	0	0
Liberal	5	47	0	0	0
Progressive Conservative	0	0	37	2	0
Other parties	0	1	3	3	3

== Riding-by-riding results ==
Names in bold represent cabinet ministers and the Speaker. Party leaders are italicized. The symbol " ** " indicates MLAs who are not running again.

=== Northwestern Saskatchewan ===
Electoral district	Candidates				Incumbent
Electoral district	CCF	Liberal	PC	Other	Incumbent
Athabasca	Pierre Ephrem Ayotte; 57	Louis Marcien Marion; 626	Alexander Fred; De Laronde; 9	Errick Guttormur Erickson (Ind.) 78 Francis Xavier Poitras (Ind. Liberal) 5	Hubert Staines**
Cut Knife	Isidore Charles Nollet; 2726	John A. Gordon; 1820			William Roseland**
Meadow Lake	Herschel Lee Howell; 2034	Donald MacDonald; 1805	William Titley; 362	Arthur J. Doucet (Labor-Progressive) 716	Donald MacDonald
Redberry	Dmytro Matthew Lazorko; 2306	Wilfred James Langley; 1285	Ernest Wilson; 662	Peter John Semko (Ind.) 99	Orest Zerebko**
Rosthern	Henry Begrand; 1541	Peter J. Hooge; 2199	Gordon Ellis Goble; 473		John Michael Uhrich**
Shellbrook	Albert Victor Sterling; 3310	Omer Demers; 2177			Omer Alphonse Demers
The Battlefords	Alexander Duff Connon; 2783	Paul Prince; 2426	Robert Wendell McNair; 446		Paul Prince
Turtleford	Bob Wooff; 2506	William Franklin Kerr; 1766	Chester Hicks; 399		William Franklin Kerr

=== Northeastern Saskatchewan ===
Electoral district	Candidates				Incumbent
Electoral district	CCF	Liberal	PC	Other	Incumbent
Cumberland	Leslie Walter Lee; 357	Deakin Alexander Hall; 242	Raoul Olier; St. Denis; 11		Deakin Alexander Hall
Humboldt	Ben Putnam; 3587	Arnold William Loehr; 2673	Stephen David Weese; 358		Joseph William Burton**
Kelvington	Peter Anton Howe; 3132	Gladstone Mansfield Ferrie; 1880	Samuel Edward Hall; 649		Peter Anton Howe
Kinistino	William James Boyle; 3055	Russell Martin Paul; 1544	Andrew Fraser; 671		John Richard Parish Taylor**
Melfort	Oakland Woods Valleau; 3396	John Duncan MacFarlane; 1862	Stanley Beattie Caskey; 1450		Oakland Woods Valleau
Prince Albert	Lachlan Fraser McIntosh; 6178	Harold John Fraser; 3617	Edgar Percy Woodman; 655		Harold John Fraser
Tisdale	John Hewgill Brockelbank; 5283	Clarence Railsback O'Connor; 2269	Isaac Flexman Stothers; 703		John Hewgill Brockelbank
Torch River	John Bruce Harris; 2609	Donald L. Menzies; 846	Keith Acton Baldwin; 535		James Archibald Kiteley**

=== West Central Saskatchewan ===
Electoral district	Candidates				Incumbent
Electoral district	CCF	Liberal	PC	Other	Incumbent
Arm River	William R. Fansher; 2256	Gustaf Herman Danielson; 2343	Thomas Alfred Homersham; 1068		Gustaf Herman Danielson
Biggar	Woodrow Stanley Lloyd; 3633	Frank Freeman; 2156			John Allan Young**
Hanley	James Smith Aitken; 2272	**Charles Agar**; 1775	James Hubert Cannon; 893		Charles Agar
Kerrobert-Kindersley	John Wellbelove; 3236	Donald Laing; 2377	Wellington Smith Myers; 933		Donald Laing
Rosetown	John Taylor Douglas; 3168	William Leith; 1864	John Wilbert Stewart; 1046		Neil McVicar**
Watrous	James Andrew Darling; 3801	Frank Stephen Krenn; 2312	Hugh Smith; 749		Frank Stephen Krenn
Wilkie	Hans Ove Hansen; 3567	John Cunningham Knowles; 2527			John Cunningham Knowles

=== East Central Saskatchewan ===
Electoral district	Candidates				Incumbent
Electoral district	CCF	Liberal	PC	Other	Incumbent
Canora	Myron Henry Feeley; 3538	Stephen T. Shabbits; 2537			Myron Henry Feeley
Last Mountain	Jacob Benson; 3803	Henry Philip Mang; 2064	James Lindsay Blair; 1281		Jacob Benson
Melville	William James Arthurs; 4575	Lionel Stilborn; 3614	Shamus Patrick Regan; 821		John Frederick Herman**
Pelly	Dan Daniels; 3273	Reginald John Marsden Parker; 2544		William Michael Berezowski (Labor-Progressive) 554	Reginald John Marsden Parker
Saltcoats	Joseph Lee Phelps; 3461	Donald Alexander MacKenzie; 2874	Rae Melville Salkeld; 454		Joseph Lee Phelps
Touchwood	**Tom Johnston**; 3337	John Joseph Collins; 1925	William Seneshen; 301		Tom Johnston
Wadena	George Hara Williams; 4162	George Russell Cook; 1686		Walter Elvy Rogers (Ind.) 207	George Hara Williams
Yorkton	Arthur Percy Swallow; 3887	Alfred Ariel Brown; 2280	Norman Roebuck; 958		Alan Carl Stewart** (Unity)

=== Southwest Saskatchewan ===
Electoral district	Candidates				Incumbent
Electoral district	CCF	Liberal	PC	Other	Incumbent
Elrose	Maurice John Willis; 3771	Hubert Staines; 1807	Ernest J. Ewing; 1013		Louis Henry Hantelman**
Gravelbourg	Henry Edmund Houze; 2681	Edward M. Culliton; 2586			Edward Milton Culliton
Gull Lake	Alvin Cecil Murray; 3942	Harvey Harold McMahon; 2200	Charles Howard Howlett; 1356		Harvey Harold McMahon
Maple Creek	Beatrice Janet Trew; 3656	John Joseph Mildenberger; 2872	George Chester Stewart; 911		John Joseph Mildenberger
Morse	Sidney Merlin Spidell; 2763	Benjamin Thomas Hyde; 2122	Clifford Bruce Martin; 725		Benjamin Thomas Hyde
Notukeu-Willow Bunch	Niles Leonard Buchanan; 4176	Charles William Johnson; 2862			Charles William Johnson
Swift Current	Harry Gibbs; 4756	James Gordon Taggart; 3123	Bryan Maxwell Hill; 1021		James Gordon Taggart

=== Southeast Saskatchewan ===
Electoral district	Candidates				Incumbent
Electoral district	CCF	Liberal	PC	Other	Incumbent
Bengough	Allan Lister Samuel Brown; 3847	Thomas Waddell; 2473			Herman Kersler Warren** (Unity)
Cannington	Gladys Strum; 3204	**William John Patterson**; 3210	William Armstrong Brigden; 687		William John Patterson
Lumsden	William Sancho Thair; 2966	James Gallagher Knox; 1887	Arthur Maurice Pearson; 1220		Robert Scott Donaldson**
Milestone	Frank Keem Malcolm; 3302	William Pedersen; 2207			William Pedersen
Moosomin	David Alexander Cunningham; 3324	Arthur Thomas Procter; 3865			Arthur Thomas Procter
Qu'Appelle-Wolseley	Warden Burgess; 4339	Frederick Middleton Dundas; 3314	William Herman Acres; 938		Frederick Middleton Dundas
Souris-Estevan	Charles David Cuming; 3933	Norman Leslie McLeod; 2660	Herbert Samuel Penny; 1259		Norman Leslie McLeod
Weyburn	**Thomas Clement Douglas**; 5605	James Weyburn Adolphe; 3489			George Levi Crane**

=== Urban constituencies ===
Electoral district	Candidates				Incumbent
Electoral district	CCF	Liberal	PC	Other	Incumbent
Moose Jaw City	John Wesley Corman; 6296 Dempster Henry Ratcliffe Heming; 5894	William George Baker; 2881 Harold Walpole Pope; 2887	Russell Lawrence Brownridge; 1271 Hugh Alexander Tiers; 1036	Frank Ernest Talbot (Social Credit) 249	William Gladstone Ross** William George Baker
Saskatoon City	John Henry Sturdy; 9375 Arthur Thomas Stone; 7792	James Wilfred Estey; 5084 Robert Mitford Pinder; 3924	Rupert David Ramsay; 5368 Henry Oswald Wright; 3171	Frederick Nelson Clarke (Labor-Progressive) 797 Russell Hartney (Ind.) 200 John Harrison Hilton (Ind.) 121	Robert Mitford Pinder James Wilfred Estey
Regina City	Clarence Melvin Fines; 14129 Charles Cromwell Williams; 14784	Charles Roberts Davidson; 10982 Bernard J. McDaniel; 10551	Hugh McGillivray; 3536 Claude Henry James Burrows; 3114		Bernard J. McDaniel Percy McCuaig Anderson**

== By-elections ==
By-election: Shellbrook, June 29, 1945 CCF hold
Party	Candidate	Votes	%	±%
CCF	Guy Franklin Van Eaton	3,350	53.1	-7.3
Liberal	Harold Keith Elder	2,514	42.9	+3.2
Social Credit	Albert M. Courchene	450	15.2	-
Total		6,314		

By-election: Wadena, November 21, 1945 CCF hold
Party	Candidate	Votes	%	±%
CCF	Frederick Arthur Dewhurst	2,474	80.9	+12.2
Labor-Progressive	William Beeching	584	19.1	-
Total		3,085		

By-election: Morse, June 27, 1946 CCF hold
Party	Candidate	Votes	%	±%
CCF	James William Gibson	3,006	46.1	-3.1
Liberal	Herbert Wiebe	2,410	37.0	-0.8
Progressive Conservative	Rupert Ramsay	1,098	16.9	+3.9
Total		6,514		

== 1944 service elections ==
Active Service Voters, Saskatchewan members of the Canadian armed services on active duty outside of Saskatchewan, were polled between October 17 and October 30, 1944. One representative was elected from each of three areas. These candidates did not specify any party affiliation.

=== Area 1 (Great Britain) ===
Candidate	Votes	%
LAC Delmar Storey Valleau	605	
Lt. Col. N.S. Cuthbert	554	
Lt. Col. F.E. Bell	330	
Major J.R. Mather	319	
Lt. P.A. Mahon	311	
Sgt. H.S. Bearden	301	
RSM A.S. Cochrane	301	
Lt. Col. F. Steele	283	
F/L C.A. Angus	265	
Col. R.B. Martin	260	
F/L G. Ward	233	
Capt. H.C. Rees	217	
S/Sgt. S. Haskell	159	
F/O J.C. Cavanagh	149	
Lt. J.E. McCann	90	
F/O J. Knippelberg	89	
Capt. S.A. Giverego	53	

=== Area 2 (Mediterranean Theatre) ===
Candidate	Votes	%
Lt. Col. Alan Williams Embury	803	
BSM H.J. MacBurney	451	
Sgt. H.M. Woollard	218	
Pte. J.H. Heffernan	216	
Capt. E. Horvath	211	
Capt. K.A. Calder	203	
Cpl. Ian Selkirk	186	
Lt. J.H. Archer	168	
BSM R.G. Polloc	148	
Lt. E.J. Western	105	
Sgt. V.C. McCarthy	86	
Sgt. C.J. Baker	59	
Sgt. D.G. Rice	49	
A/PO H.W. Moody	41	

=== Area 3 (Newfoundland and Canada outside of Saskatchewan) ===
Candidate	Votes	%
Major Malcolm James Dobie	510	
S/L John Allan Young	386	
C.W.M.S. Clifford Herbert Peet	355	
Lt. Col. Henry Austin Hunt	355	
Lt. Douglas Hague	347	
S/L E.W. Campbell	317	
Major Percy H. Maguire	265	
AC1 John Bender	209	
Lt. Col. Thomas Russell MacNutt	209	
Lt. Comdr. Donald Alexander Grant	190	
L/Sgt. William Harold Lilwall	186	
S/L Angus C. McClaskey	170	
F/L Walter Hemming Nelson	124	
Sgt. Benjamin Malcolm MacKinnon	114	
F/O Robert Bruce Butler	114	
Sgt. Irving S. Brown	80	
S.Q.M.S. (WO II) David Vogt	74	
F/S Gerhard Epp	72	
F/S Arthur Rudolph Dohlen	41	
F/L H.E.M. Hales	29	

== See also ==
- List of political parties in Saskatchewan
- List of Saskatchewan provincial electoral districts
