= Saskatchewan Legislature =

Canadian province governance body

- 30th Saskatchewan Legislature

Type
- Type: Unicameral
- Houses: Legislative Assembly
- Sovereign: The lieutenant governor (representing the King of Canada)

History
- Founded: 1905
- Preceded by: Northwest Territories Legislature

Meeting place
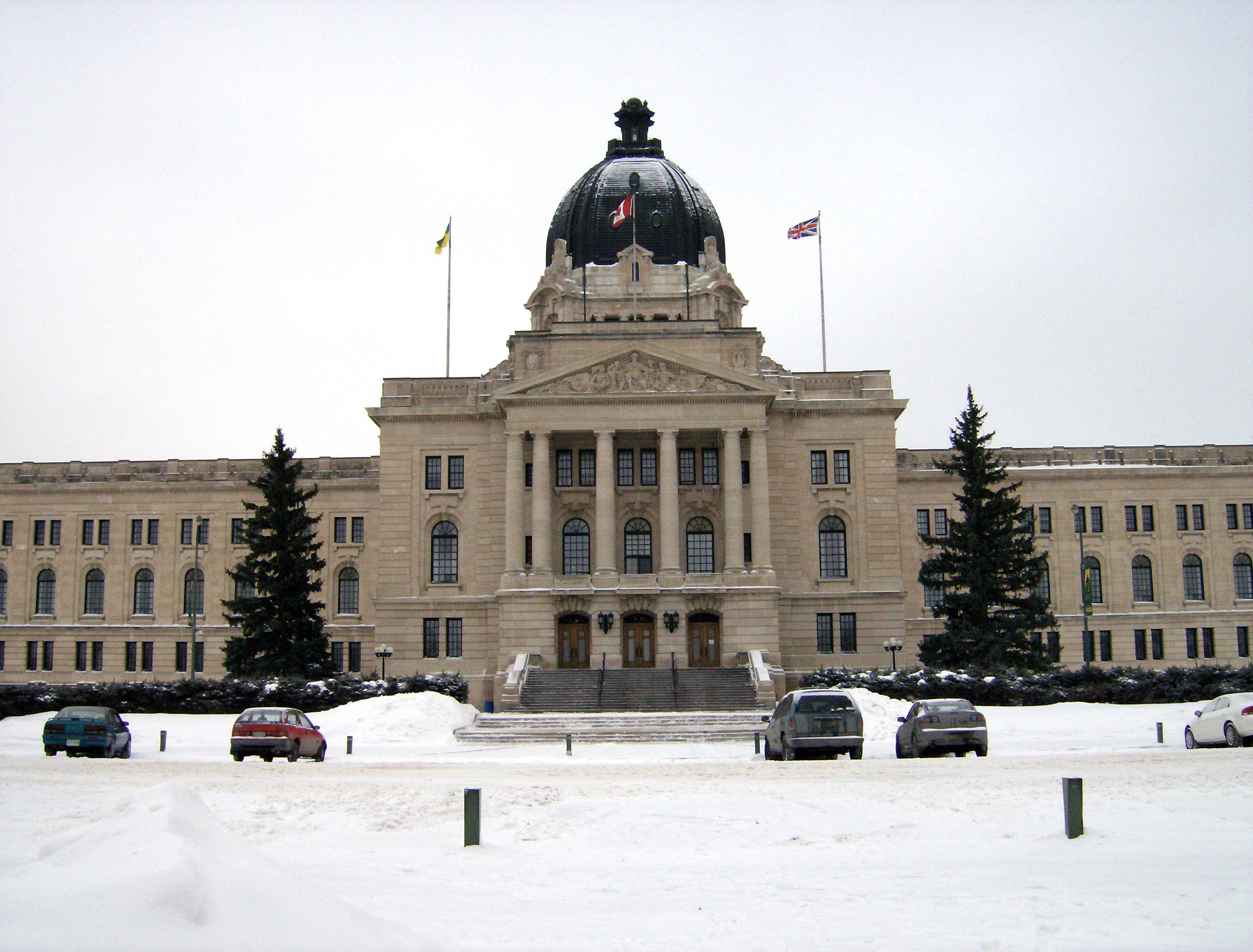
- Legislative Building, Regina, Saskatchewan, Canada

The Saskatchewan Legislature is made of two elements: the lieutenant governor as representative of the King of Canada, and the unicameral assembly called the Legislative Assembly. The legislature has existed since Saskatchewan was formed out of part of the North-West Territories in 1905.

Like the Canadian federal government, Saskatchewan uses a Westminster-style parliamentary government, in which members are sent to the Legislative Assembly after general elections and from there the party with the most seats chooses a premier and Executive Council. The premier is Saskatchewan's head of government.

== List of legislatures ==
Following is a list of the 30 times the legislature has been convened since 1905. For previous legislatures, see List of Northwest Territories Legislative Assemblies.

| Assembly Sessions | Election | From To (Note: From opening day of legislature to the day that the legislature was dissolved.) | Governing Party | Premier | Official Opposition Party Leader | Speaker of the House |
|---|---|---|---|---|---|---|
| 1st Legislature 3 sessions | 1st general | Mar. 29, 1906; July 20, 1908 | Liberal | Walter Scott | Provincial Rights Frederick Haultain | Thomas MacNutt |
| 2nd Legislature 4 sessions | 2nd general | Dec. 10, 1908; June 15, 1912 | Liberal | Walter Scott | Provincial Rights Frederick Haultain | William Charles Sutherland |
| 3rd Legislature 6 sessions | 3rd general | Nov. 14, 1912; June 2, 1917 | Liberal | Walter Scott (Note: Until October 20, 1916) William M. Martin | Conservative Wellington Willoughby | John Albert Sheppard (Note: Until October 15, 1916) Robert Menzies Mitchell |
| 4th Legislature 4 sessions | 4th general | Nov. 13, 1917; May 16, 1921 | Liberal | William M. Martin | Conservative Donald Maclean (Note: Until April 1921) | Robert Menzies Mitchell (Note: Until May 1, 1919) George Adam Scott |
| 5th Legislature 5 sessions | 5th general | Dec. 8, 1921; May 9, 1925 | Liberal | William M. Martin (Note: Until April 5, 1922) Charles Avery Dunning | Conservative John Archibald Maharg (Note: In 1923); Harris Turner (Note: From 1924 to 1925) | George Adam Scott |
| 6th Legislature 4 sessions | 6th general | Dec. 3, 1925; May 11, 1929 | Liberal | Charles Avery Dunning (Note: Until February 26, 1926) James Garfield Gardiner | Progressive Charles Tran and Conservative; James Thomas Milton Anderson | Walter George Robinson |
| 7th Legislature 6 sessions | 7th general | Sep. 4, 1929; May 25, 1934 | Conservative coalition | James Thomas Milton Anderson | Liberal James Garfield Gardiner | James Fraser Bryant (Note: Until September 9, 1929) Robert Sterritt Leslie |
| 8th Legislature 4 sessions | 8th general | Nov. 15, 1934; May 14, 1938 | Liberal | James Garfield Gardiner (Note: Until November 1, 1935) William John Patterson | Co-operative Commonwealth Federation George Hara Williams | John Mason Parker |
| 9th Legislature 6 sessions | 9th general | Jan. 19, 1939; May 10, 1944 | Liberal | William John Patterson | Co-operative Commonwealth Federation George Hara Williams (Note: Until 1941); John Hewgill Brockelbank | Charles Agar |
| 10th Legislature 5 sessions | 10th general | Oct. 19, 1944; May 19, 1948 | Co-operative Commonwealth Federation | Tommy Douglas | Liberal William John Patterson | Tom Johnston |
| 11th Legislature 5 sessions | 11th general | Feb. 10, 1949; May 7, 1952 | Co-operative Commonwealth Federation | Tommy Douglas | Liberal Walter Adam Tucker | Tom Johnston |
| 12th Legislature 4 sessions | 12th general | Feb. 12, 1953; May 8, 1956 | Co-operative Commonwealth Federation | Tommy Douglas | Liberal Walter Adam Tucker (Note: Until 1954); Asmundur A. Loptson (Note: Until 1955); Alexander Hamilton McDonald | Tom Johnston |
| 13th Legislature 5 sessions | 13th general | Feb. 14, 1957; May 4, 1960 | Co-operative Commonwealth Federation | Tommy Douglas | Liberal Alexander Hamilton McDonald | James Andrew Darling |
| 14th Legislature 6 sessions | 14th general | Feb. 9, 1961; Mar. 18, 1964 | Co-operative Commonwealth Federation | Tommy Douglas (Note: Until November 1961) Woodrow Lloyd | Liberal Ross Thatcher | Everett Irvine Wood (Note: Until 1962) Frederick Arthur Dewhurst |
| 15th Legislature 4 sessions | 15th general | Feb. 4, 1965; Sept. 8, 1967 | Liberal | Ross Thatcher | Co-operative Commonwealth Federation Woodrow Lloyd | James Snedker |
| 16th Legislature 5 sessions | 16th general | Feb. 15, 1968; May 25, 1971 | Liberal | Ross Thatcher | New Democratic Party Woodrow Lloyd (Note: Until 1970); Allan Blakeney | James Snedker |
| 17th Legislature 5 sessions | 17th general | July 28, 1971; May 13, 1975 | New Democratic Party | Allan Blakeney | Liberal Ross Thatcher (Note: Until July 1971); David Steuart | Frederick Arthur Dewhurst |
| 18th Legislature 5 sessions | 18th general | Nov. 12, 1975; Sept. 19, 1978 | New Democratic Party | Allan Blakeney | Liberal David Steuart (Note: Until July 1976); Edward Cyril Malone (Note: From June 24, 1977 to 1978, shared with Richard Lee Collver) Progressive Conservative (Note: From June 24, 1977 to 1978); Richard Lee Collver | John Edward Brockelbank |
| 19th Legislature 4 sessions | 19th general | Feb. 22, 1979; Mar. 29, 1982 | New Democratic Party | Allan Blakeney | Progressive Conservative Richard Lee Collver (Note: Until November 1979); Eric Arthur Berntson | John Edward Brockelbank |
| 20th Legislature 5 sessions | 20th general | June 17, 1982; Sept. 19, 1986 | Progressive Conservative | Grant Devine | New Democratic Party Allan Blakeney | Herbert Swan |
| 21st Legislature 4 sessions | 21st general | Dec. 3, 1986; Sept. 2, 1991 | Progressive Conservative | Grant Devine | New Democratic Party Allan Blakeney (Note: Until November 1987); Roy John Romanow | Arnold Bernard Tusa |
| 22nd Legislature 5 sessions | 22nd general | Dec. 2, 1991; May 23, 1995 | New Democratic Party | Roy Romanow | Progressive Conservative Grant Devine (Note: Until October 1992); Richard Swenson (Note: Until November 1994); Bill Boyd | Herman Rolfes |
| 23rd Legislature 4 sessions | 23rd general | Feb. 29, 1996; Aug. 19, 1999 | New Democratic Party | Roy Romanow | Liberal Ron Osika | Glenn Joseph Hagel |
| 24th Legislature 4 sessions | 24th general | Dec. 6, 1999; Oct. 8, 2003 | New Democratic Party | Roy Romanow (Note: Until February 8, 2001) Lorne Calvert | Saskatchewan Party Elwin Hermanson | Ron Osika (Note: Until February 6, 2001) Myron Kowalsky |
| 25th Legislature 3 sessions | 25th general | Mar. 18, 2004; Oct. 10, 2007 | New Democratic Party | Lorne Calvert | Saskatchewan Party Elwin Hermanson (Note: Until 2004); Brad Wall | Myron Kowalsky |
| 26th Legislature 5 sessions | 26th general | Dec. 10, 2007; Oct. 10, 2011 | Saskatchewan Party | Brad Wall | New Democratic Party Lorne Calvert (Note: Until June 6, 2009); Dwain Lingenfelter | Don Toth |
| 27th Legislature | 27th general | Dec. 5, 2011; Mar. 8, 2016 | Saskatchewan Party | Brad Wall | New Democratic Party Dwain Lingenfelter (Note: Until November 19, 2011); John Nilson (Note: November 19, 2011 - March 9, 2013); Cam Broten (Note: From March 9, 2013) | Dan D'Autremont |
| 28th Legislature 4 sessions | 28th general | May 17, 2016; Sep. 29, 2020 | Saskatchewan Party | Brad Wall (Note: Until February 2, 2018) Scott Moe | New Democratic Party Cam Broten (Note: Until April 4, 2016); Trent Wotherspoon (Note: April 12, 2016 - June 20, 2017); Nicole Sarauer (Note: June 20, 2017 - March 3, 2018); Ryan Meili (Note: From March 3, 2018) | Corey Tochor (Note: Until January 5, 2018) Mark Docherty (Note: From January 5, 2018) |
| 29th Legislature | 29th general | Nov. 30, 2020; Oct. 1, 2024 | Saskatchewan Party | Scott Moe | New Democratic Party Ryan Meili; Carla Beck | Randy Weekes |
| 30th Legislature | 30th general | Nov. 25, 2024 present | Saskatchewan Party | Scott Moe | New Democratic Party; Carla Beck | Todd Goudy |
