= 1975 Saskatchewan general election =

Canadian provincial election

- June 11, 1975

61 seats in the Legislative Assembly of Saskatchewan 31 seats needed for a majority
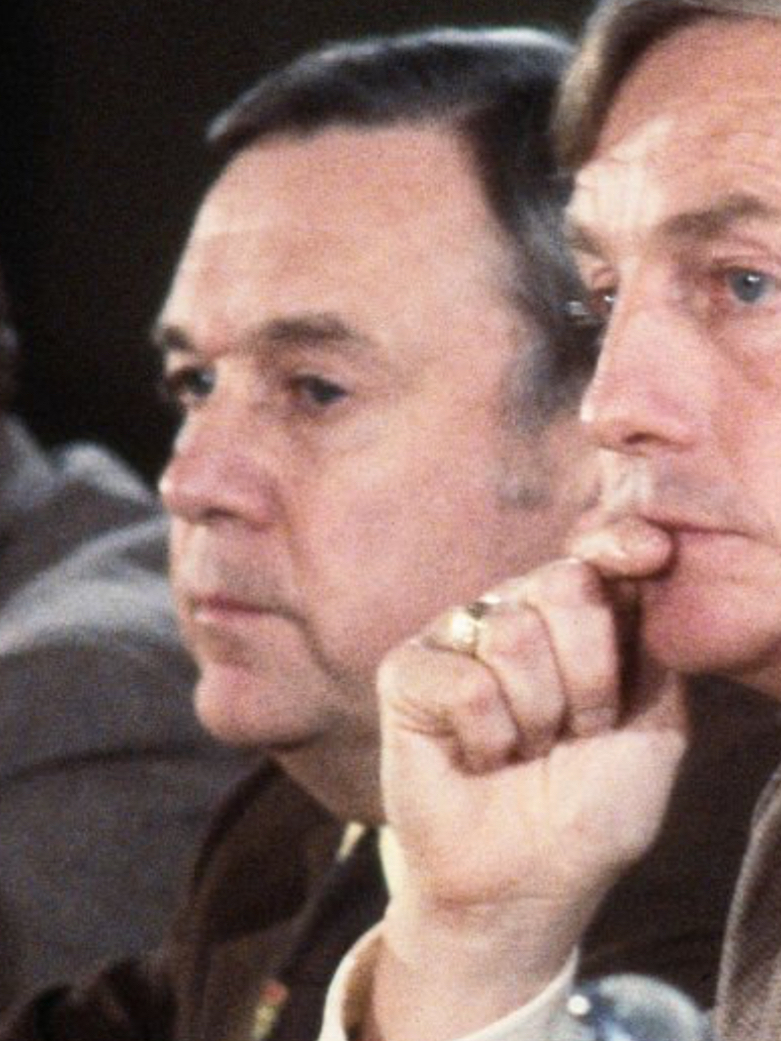

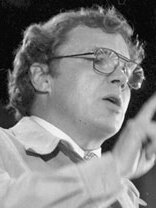
	First party	Second party	Third party
Leader	Allan Blakeney	David Steuart	Richard Collver
Party	New Democratic	Liberal	Progressive Conservative
Leader since	July 4, 1970	December 11, 1971	March 18, 1973
Leader's seat	Regina Elphinstone	Prince Albert- Duck Lake	Nipawin
Last election	45	15	0
Seats won	39	15	7
Seat change	▼6	±0	▲7
Popular vote	180,700	142,853	124,573
Percentage	40.07%	31.67%	27.62%
Swing	▼14.93pp	▼11.15pp	▲25.49pp
Premier before election
Allan Blakeney
New Democratic
Premier after election
Allan Blakeney
New Democratic

The 1975 Saskatchewan general election was held on June 11, 1975, to elect members of the Legislative Assembly of Saskatchewan. Blakeney and the NDP were re-elected to a majority government.

Both the New Democratic government of Premier Allan Blakeney and the opposition Liberal Party, led by David Steuart, dropped in support to the resurgent Progressive Conservative Party. The Tories, who were a minor force in the previous election, drew over a quarter of the 1975 electorate.

== Campaign ==
One of the main issues of the campaign was natural resources management. At the onset of the campaign, Saskatchewan was facing court challenges and a capital strike from multinational resource extraction companies. The potash industry was opposed to the new provincial reserve tax that Blakeney's government had introduced on that mineral the previous year. The federal government under Pierre Trudeau supported the companies' court challenges, and announced in the November 1974 federal budget that it would end the deduction of provincial royalties from federal tax.

Under these circumstances, the opposition Liberal and PC parties proposed lower natural resource royalty payments to ease the companies' concerns and bring investments back to the province. They were fiercely opposed to public ownership in the extraction and refinement of natural resources. On the other hand, Blakeney's NDP ran on the slogan New Deal '75. The platform promised to increase royalties, and more direct government participation in the natural resources sector, especially for the development and exploration of energy resources like oil, gas, coal and uranium; and minerals like potash.

== Results ==
Party	Party Leader	# of candidates	Seats			Popular Vote		
Party	Party Leader	# of candidates	1971	Elected	% Change	#	%	% Change
New Democratic	Allan Blakeney	61	45	39	-13.3%	180,700	40.07%	-14.93%
Liberal	David Steuart	61	15	15	–	142,853	31.67%	-11.15%
Progressive Conservative	Richard Collver	61	–	7	+600%	124,573	27.62%	+25.49%
Independent		5	–	–	–	2,897	0.64%	+0.60%
Total		188	60	61	+1.7%	451,023	100%	
Source: Elections Saskatchewan

=== Percentages ===
Popular vote
New Democratic	40.07%
Liberal	31.67%
PC	27.62%
Others	0.64%

Seats summary
New Democratic	63.93%
Liberal	24.59%
PC	11.48%

=== Ranking ===
Party	Seats	Second	Third	Fourth
New Democratic	39	15	7	0
Liberal	15	27	19	0
Progressive Conservative	7	19	34	1
Independents	0	0	1	4

== Riding results ==
Names in bold represent cabinet ministers and the Speaker. Party leaders are italicized. The symbol " ** " indicates MLAs who are not running again.

=== Northwest Saskatchewan ===
Electoral District	Candidates				Incumbent
Electoral District	NDP	Liberal	PC	Other	Incumbent
Athabasca	Frederick John Thompson; 1,483	Ben Siemens; 1,157	Roy Simpson; 421	Rod Bishop (Ind.); 829	Allan Ray Guy
Cut Knife-Lloydminster	Miro Kwasnica; 2,794	Sam Herman; 2,076	Fred Baynton; 2,113		Miro Kwasnica
Meadow Lake	Gord McNeill; 2,094	Henry Coupland; 2,058	Leo Jeannotte; 1,705		Henry Ethelbert Coupland
Redberry	Dennis Banda; 2,783	Emil Craig; 2,006	Nick E. Kowerchuk; 1,835		Dick Michayluk**
Rosthern	A.R. Friesen; 2,030	Allan Ray Guy; 2,277	Ralph Katzman; 2,718		David Boldt**
The Battlefords	Eiling Kramer; 3,660	Peter Tarnowsky; 2,674	Walter Kostyna; 1,212		Eiling Kramer
Turtleford	Lloyd Johnson; 2,405	Cyril Fransoo; 1,994	Gordon Mayer; 1,666		Michael Feduniak**

=== Northeast Saskatchewan ===
Electoral District	Candidates				Incumbent
Electoral District	NDP	Liberal	PC	Other	Incumbent
Cumberland	Norm MacAuley; 1,646	Winston McKay; 1,128	Garry M. Houghton; 511	Frank R. Tomkins (Ind.) 403	New District
Kelsey-Tisdale	John R. Messer; 3,750	Alan E. Caithcart; 2,266	Jack Ukrainetz; 1,831		John Rissler Messer; Tisdale-Kelsey
Kinistino	Arthur Thibault; 3,215	Ed Olchowy; 2,400	Tom Smith; 1,657		New District
Melfort	Norm Vickar; 3,102	Herbert J. Whitley; 2,196	Bill Warner; 3,001		Arthur Thibault; Melfort-Kinistino
Nipawin	John Comer; 2,599	Ellis H. Hill; 1,447	Richard Collver; 3,381		John Kristian Comer
Prince Albert	Mike Feschuk; 2,947	Kenneth A. Beeson; 1,947	Richard E. Spencer; 2,689		Mike Feschuk; Prince Albert East
Prince Albert-Duck Lake	Louis Roy; 2,822	Davey Steuart; 3,675	Norm Wipf; 1,472		David Gordon Steuart; Prince Albert West
Shellbrook	George Bowerman; 3,138	Louis W. Hradecki; 1,584	John P. Meagher; 2,035		George Bowerman

March 2, 1977 By-election: Prince Albert-Duck Lake
Party	Candidate	Votes	%	±%
Prog. Conservative	Norm Wipf	3,022	39.84%	+21.37
NDP	Jerome Hammersmith	2,773	36.55%	+1.14
Liberal	Alexandre Joseph Baribeau	1,791	23.61%	-22.51
Total		7,586	100.00	

=== West Central Saskatchewan ===
Electoral District	Candidates				Incumbent
Electoral District	NDP	Liberal	PC	Other	Incumbent
Arm River	Donald Leonard Faris; 2,854	Ron Thorstad; 2,843	Ron McLelland; 1,974		Donald Leonard Faris
Biggar	Elwood L. Cowley; 3,223	Arthur Meister; 1,520	Ralph Young; 1,906		Elwood Lorrie Cowley
Humboldt	Edwin Tchorzewski; 3,006	Peter Cline; 2,087	Ray Perpick; 2,334		Edwin Tchorzewski
Kindersley	Alex Taylor; 2,322	Allan McMillan; 2,659	Bayne Secord; 2,348		Alex Taylor; Kerrobert-Kindersley
Rosetown-Elrose	Bill Owens; 2,673	Calvin W. Fensom; 2,004	Roy Bailey; 3,078		George Fredrick Loken**; Rosetown
Rosetown-Elrose	Bill Owens; 2,673	Calvin W. Fensom; 2,004	Roy Bailey; 3,078		Merged district
Rosetown-Elrose	Bill Owens; 2,673	Calvin W. Fensom; 2,004	Roy Bailey; 3,078		Hayden William Owens; Elrose
Wilkie	Delaine Scotton; 2,223	Linda Clifford; 2,831	Jim Garner; 2,138		Joseph "Cliff" McIsaac**

=== East Central Saskatchewan ===
Electoral District	Candidates				Incumbent
Electoral District	NDP	Liberal	PC	Other	Incumbent
Canora	Al Matsalla; 4,024	Marie Kotelko; 2,310	Michael Kaminski; 1,656		Al Matsalla
Kelvington-Wadena	Neil Byers; 4,051	Joe Bencharski; 1,846	Don Austring; 2,111		Neil Erland Byers; Kelvington
Kelvington-Wadena	Neil Byers; 4,051	Joe Bencharski; 1,846	Don Austring; 2,111		Merged district
Kelvington-Wadena	Neil Byers; 4,051	Joe Bencharski; 1,846	Don Austring; 2,111		Fred Dewhurst**; Wadena
Last Mountain-Touchwood	Gordon MacMurchy; 3,640	Les Digney; 1,819	Arnold Tusa; 2,565		Gordon MacMurchy; Last Mountain
Last Mountain-Touchwood	Gordon MacMurchy; 3,640	Les Digney; 1,819	Arnold Tusa; 2,565		Merged district
Last Mountain-Touchwood	Gordon MacMurchy; 3,640	Les Digney; 1,819	Arnold Tusa; 2,565		Frank Meakes**; Touchwood
Melville	John Kowalchuk; 3,747	Joseph L. Sedlovitch; 2,019	Glenn Miller; 2,478		John Russell Kowalchuk
Pelly	Leo Larson; 3,511	Peter E. McDonald; 2,250	W.J. Ferniuk; 1,150	George G. Shlakoff (Ind.) 75	Leonard Melvin Larson
Quill Lakes	Murray Koskie; 3,211	Arnold E. Boyko; 2,022	Dick Harcourt; 1,342		New District
Saltcoats	Ed Kaeding; 2,887	William H. Peasley; 2,058	Wilfred J. Walker; 2,109		Ed Kaeding
Yorkton	Randy Nelson; 3,099	Arlis Dellow; 2,958	Ivan Daunt; 2,173		Irving Wensley Carlson**

June 8, 1977 By-election: Pelly
Party	Candidate	Votes	%	±%
NDP	Norm Lusney	3,724	48.29%	-1.97
Prog. Conservative	Barrie Johnson	2,314	30.00%	+13.54
Liberal	Donn Walsh	1,674	21.71%	-10.50
Total		7,712	100.00	

=== Southwest Saskatchewan ===
Electoral District	Candidates				Incumbent
Electoral District	NDP	Liberal	PC	Other	Incumbent
Assiniboia-Gravelbourg	Allan Engel; 3,012	Roy Nelson; 3,400	Connie McLeod; 1,517		David Hadley Lange; Assiniboia-Bengough
Assiniboia-Gravelbourg	Allan Engel; 3,012	Roy Nelson; 3,400	Connie McLeod; 1,517		Merged district
Assiniboia-Gravelbourg	Allan Engel; 3,012	Roy Nelson; 3,400	Connie McLeod; 1,517		Reginald John Gross; Gravelbourg
Maple Creek	Gene Flasch; 2,232	Bill Stodalka; 2,698	Eric Richardson; 2,241		Gene Flasch
Moose Jaw North	John Skoberg; 3,468	Emmett Reidy; 2,284	Ken Glenn; 2,286		Don MacDonald**
Moose Jaw South	Gordon Snyder; 3,950	Faye Gordon; 1,521	Arthur "Bud" Smith; 1,857		Gordon Taylor Snyder
Morse	Reg Gross; 2,502	Jack Wiebe; 2,517	Art Martens; 1,847		John Edward Niel Wiebe
Shaunavon	Allan Oliver; 2,593	Eiliv "Sonny" Anderson; 3,370	Eric Slater; 1,375		Allan Roy Oliver
Swift Current	Murray Walter; 2,452	Len Stein; 1,734	Dennis Ham; 3,494		Everett Irvine Wood**
Thunder Creek	Jim Murdock; 2,036	Colin Thatcher; 2,640	Don Swenson; 2,348		New District

=== Southeast Saskatchewan ===
Electoral District	Candidates				Incumbent
Electoral District	NDP	Liberal	PC	Other	Incumbent
Bengough-Milestone	David Lange; 2,819	Grant Frank; 1,927	E.R. Moody; 2,512		David Hadley Lange; Assiniboia-Bengough
Bengough-Milestone	David Lange; 2,819	Grant Frank; 1,927	E.R. Moody; 2,512		Merged district
Bengough-Milestone	David Lange; 2,819	Grant Frank; 1,927	E.R. Moody; 2,512		Cyril Pius MacDonald; Milestone
Estevan	Kim Thorson; 2,499	Ian MacDougall; 1,464	Bob Larter; 4,354		Kim Thorson; Souris-Estevan
Indian Head-Wolseley	Terry Hanson; 2,241	Cyril MacDonald; 2,844	Jack H. Horsman; 2,205		Terry Lyle Hanson; Qu'Appelle-Wolseley
Moosomin	Fred A. Easton; 2,087	Frank Gardner; 2,891	Larry Birkbeck; 3,018		E. Franklin Gardner
Qu'Appelle	Donald W. Cody; 3,430	John Gary Lane; 3,796	F. Warren Denzin; 1,806		John Gary Lane; Lumsden
Souris-Cannington	James T. Eaton; 1,530	Tom Weatherald; 2,494	Eric Berntson; 3,212		Kim Thorson; Souris-Estevan
Souris-Cannington	James T. Eaton; 1,530	Tom Weatherald; 2,494	Eric Berntson; 3,212		Merged district
Souris-Cannington	James T. Eaton; 1,530	Tom Weatherald; 2,494	Eric Berntson; 3,212		Thomas Milton Weatherald; Cannington
Weyburn	Jim Pepper; 2,971	Norm Flaten; 2,299	John Whitell; 2,522		James Auburn Pepper

=== Saskatoon ===
Electoral District	Candidates				Incumbent
Electoral District	NDP	Liberal	PC	Other	Incumbent
Saskatoon Buena Vista	Herman Rolfes; 2,720	Barry Korchinski; 2,487	Harold W. Lane; 2,242		New District
Saskatoon Centre	Paul Mostoway; 3,117	Douglas R. Knott; 2,758	Morris T. Cherneskey; 2,284	John Richards (Ind.); 1,492	Beverly Dyck; Saskatoon City Park
Saskatoon Eastview	Reg Parker; 2,466	Glen Penner; 3,175	Larry Fast; 1,418		Herman Harold Rolfes; Saskatoon Nutana South
Saskatoon Mayfair	Beverly Dyck; 3,467	John Olsen; 2,120	June Smith; 2,001		John Edward Brockelbank
Saskatoon Nutana	Wes Robbins; 3,881	Bruno F. Riemer; 2,280	Kay McCorkell; 2,112		W. Albert Robbins; Saskatoon Nutana Centre
Saskatoon Riversdale	Roy Romanow; 4,172	William Stadnyk; 1,551	Gary Barnes; 961		Roy Romanow
Saskatoon Sutherland	Anne Boulton; 3,145	Evelyn Edwards; 3,843	Karim Nasser; 1,759		John G. Richards**; Saskatoon University
Saskatoon Westmount	**John Edward Brockelbank**; 3,916	Tim Ryan; 2,466	Peter Shinkaruk; 1,592		New District

March 2, 1977 By-election: Saskatoon Sutherland
Party	Candidate	Votes	%	±%
Prog. Conservative	Bill Lane	3,962	38.68%	+18.57
Liberal	Gerry Fraser	3,423	33.42%	-10.51
NDP	Anne Boulton	2,829	27.61%	-8.35
Independent	Alexander Vasey Barker	30	0.29%	
Total		10,244	100.00	

=== Regina ===
Electoral District	Candidates				Incumbent
Electoral District	NDP	Liberal	PC	Other	Incumbent
Regina Centre	Ned Shillington; 3,603	Les Hammond; 2,417	Keith Jeal; 1,500	William C. Beeching (Ind.) 98	**Allan Blakeney**
Regina Elphinstone	**Allan Blakeney**; 4,096	Donna Welke; 1,474	Arthur Cropley; 1,374		Ken MacLeod**; Regina Albert Park
Regina Lakeview	Henri Saucier; 2,603	Ted Malone; 3,374	Reg Watts; 1,767		Edward Cyril Malone
Regina North East	Walt Smishek; 3,735	Del Miller; 1,735	Christine Howard; 1,535		Walter Smishek
Regina North West	Ed Whelan; 3,174	David Bouchard; 2,333	William M. Sveinson; 2,027		Edward Charles Whelan
Regina Rosemont	Bill Allen; 3,602	George Wagner; 1,685	Gerald A. Fuller; 1,962		New District
Regina South	Eric Cline; 1,913	Stuart Cameron; 3,796	Paul Rousseau; 2,059		Gordon Grant**; Regina Whitmore Park
Regina Victoria	Henry Baker; 3,577	Graham Wolk; 1,833	Fred L. Dunbar; 1,377		New District
Regina Wascana	Agnes Groome; 2,752	Anthony Merchant; 4,126	Roy A. Rudichuk; 1,810		Henry Harold Peter Baker

== See also ==
- List of political parties in Saskatchewan
- List of Saskatchewan provincial electoral districts
