= Assiniboia-Bengough =

Former provincial electoral district in Saskatchewan, Canada

Coordinates: 49.496°N 105.595°W

Assiniboia-Bengough was a provincial electoral district for the Legislative Assembly of Saskatchewan, Canada. This constituency was created from the riding of Bengough and parts of other ridings before the 1971 Saskatchewan general election. This riding was only in existence for a few years, being replaced by the ridings of Bengough-Milestone and Assiniboia-Gravelbourg before the 1975 Saskatchewan general election.

== Member of the Legislative Assembly ==
| # | MLA | Served | Party |
|---|---|---|---|
| 1. | David Hadley Lange | 1971 - 1975 | New Democratic Party |

== Election results ==
Saskatchewan General Election 1971: Assiniboia-Bengough
| Party | Candidate | Votes | % | ±% |
|---|---|---|---|---|
| New Democratic | David Hadley Lange | 2628 | 49.08 | - |
| Liberal | Alexander Mitchell | 2312 | 43.17 | - |
| PC | James A. Hall | 415 | 7.75 | - |
| Total | | 5,355 | 100.00 | |

== See also ==
- List of Saskatchewan provincial electoral districts
- List of Saskatchewan general elections
- Canadian provincial electoral districts
