= Karl Klein =

Karl Klein may refer to:

- Karl Klein (bishop) (1819-1898), German clergyman, Bishop of Limburg
- Karl Frank Klein (1922–2006), Canadian politician and farmer
