= Saskatchewan doctors' strike =

1962 doctors' strike against universal health insurance

The Saskatchewan doctors' strike was a 23-day labour action exercised by medical doctors in 1962 in the Canadian province of Saskatchewan in an attempt to force the Co-operative Commonwealth Federation government of Saskatchewan to drop its program of universal medical insurance. The strike lasted from July 1, the day the Saskatchewan Medical Care Insurance Act took force, to July 23.

== Background ==
The Medicare plan was announced by premier Tommy Douglas in 1959 at a speech he made during the Birch Hills by-election campaign. It was the main issue of the 1960 provincial election, which was won by his Co-operative Commonwealth Federation government. A commission was struck by the government to make recommendations for the plan's implementation and was met with opposition by the Saskatchewan College of Physicians and Surgeons, which testified that doctors would not co-operate with a compulsory, government-run plan.

The Saskatchewan Medical Care Insurance Bill was introduced in the Saskatchewan legislature on October 13, 1961, and was passed and given royal assent in November. By then, Douglas had stepped down as premier in order to assume the leadership of the newly formed federal New Democratic Party and was replaced as provincial premier and CCF leader by Woodrow Lloyd, who faced enormous pressure to withdraw the plan. In an attempt to reach a compromise, Lloyd delayed the implementation of Medicare from April to July 1962.

== Strike ==
In May 1962, a meeting of the College of Physicians and Surgeons of Saskatchewan passed a resolution vowing that physicians would close their practices when Medicare came into force. "Keep Our Doctors" committees were established throughout the province and a campaign, backed by the Regina Leader-Post was undertaken, with warnings that most doctors would leave the province if socialized medicine were introduced. On July 1, 1962, the doctors strike began and approximately 90% of the province's doctors shut their offices.

During this time, anonymous letters signed by "the Swift Current citizens safety committee" accused doctors of rebelling against the people, and gave doctors until the morning of July 6 to return to normal practice or suffer harm to them and their families.

== Response of government ==
The government brought in doctors from Britain, the United States, and other provinces to staff community clinics that were set up to meet demand for health services. A July 11 rally in support of the doctors in front of the Saskatchewan legislature in Regina attracted about 4,000 people, one tenth the number hoped for by the organizers. By mid-July some of the striking doctors returned to work. Lord Taylor, a British physician who had helped implement the National Health Service in the United Kingdom, was brought in as a mediator and the "Saskatoon Agreement" ending the strike was signed on July 23, 1962. As a result of the agreement, amendments to the Act were introduced allowing doctors to opt out of Medicare and raising fee payments to doctors under the plan and to increase the number of physicians sitting on the Medical Care Insurance Commission. By 1965, most doctors favoured the continuation of Medicare.

== Outcome and legacy ==
The strike was a significant test for public healthcare. The strike's failure allowed the program to continue, and the Saskatchewan model was adopted throughout Canada within ten years. The political divisions within the province aggravated by the strike contributed to the Lloyd's government defeat in the 1964 provincial election. However, even though the Saskatchewan Liberal Party of Ross Thatcher had opposed the plan, Medicare's popularity was such that by the time of the election Liberals promised to not only leave it in place, but to expand it even more.

The Saskatchewan CCF government and the doctor's strike was portrayed in the film Prairie Giant: The Tommy Douglas Story (2006).

== See also ==
- Canadian health care
- Socialized medicine
