= Ross Thatcher =

9th Premier of Saskatchewan (1964–1971)

The Honourable Ross Thatcher PC
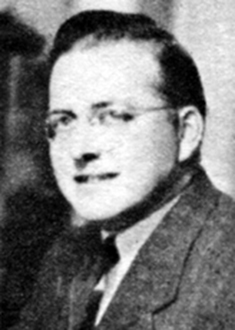

9th Premier of Saskatchewan
- In office May 22, 1964 – June 30, 1971
- Monarch: Elizabeth II
- Lieutenant Governor: Robert Hanbidge; Stephen Worobetz
- Preceded by: Woodrow S. Lloyd
- Succeeded by: Allan Blakeney

Member of the Canadian Parliament for Moose Jaw
- In office June 11, 1945 – August 10, 1953
- Preceded by: John Gordon Ross
- Succeeded by: District abolished

Member of the Canadian Parliament for Moose Jaw—Lake Centre
- In office August 10, 1953 – June 10, 1957
- Preceded by: District created
- Succeeded by: Louis Harrington Lewry

Member of the Legislative Assembly of Saskatchewan for Morse
- In office June 8, 1960 – July 22, 1971
- Preceded by: Jim Gibson
- Succeeded by: Jack Wiebe

Leader of the Opposition (Saskatchewan)
- In office June 8, 1960 – May 22, 1964
- Preceded by: Alexander H. McDonald
- Succeeded by: Woodrow Lloyd

Personal details
- Born: Wilbert Ross Thatcher; May 14, 1917 Neville, Saskatchewan, Canada
- Died: July 22, 1971 (aged 54) Regina, Saskatchewan, Canada
- Party: CCF (1942–1955); Independent (1955–1957); Liberal (1957–1971)
- Spouse: Peggie (m. 1938)
- Children: Colin Thatcher

Wilbert Ross Thatcher, PC (May 24, 1917 – July 22, 1971) was a Canadian politician who served as the ninth premier of Saskatchewan from 1964 to 1971. Thatcher began his career as a member of the Co-operative Commonwealth Federation in 1942, elected first to Moose Jaw City Council and then in 1945 as a Member of Parliament representing Moose Jaw. In 1959, Thatcher made the switch both to Saskatchewan provincial politics and to the provincial Liberal Party, which he led through four provincial elections, winning majority governments in 1964 and 1967. Following his defeat in the 1971 provincial election, Thatcher retired from politics and died shortly afterwards.

== Early life and career ==
Born in Neville, Saskatchewan, Thatcher was a Moose Jaw-based businessman, who developed an interest in politics shortly after the birth of his son, Colin Thatcher. Thatcher's father had built a chain of hardware stores across the province, which Thatcher helped to manage.

Thatcher graduated from high school at age fifteen, and attended Queen's University, in Kingston, Ontario, where he earned a commerce degree at age eighteen. Immediately following graduation, Thatcher became executive assistant to the vice-president of Canada Packers in Toronto, but returned to Saskatchewan to run the family business after his father had become ill in the late 1930s. By this time, the family business included outlets in Regina and Saskatoon as well as the original Moose Jaw store. Thatcher employed his siblings to assist him.

In the late 1950s, Thatcher transitioned away from hardware and into farming and cattle ranching in the Moose Jaw area. He employed his son Colin as a full-time manager of his agricultural businesses, starting in 1962.

== Political career ==
=== CCF and Member of Parliament (1942–57) ===
Thatcher's politics were heavily influenced by the Great Depression, after which he believed that private business alone could not stimulate economic development on the prairies. Thatcher consequently joined the socialist Co-operative Commonwealth Federation (CCF) and was elected to Moose Jaw City Council on a labour-reform slate in 1942. In the 1945 Canadian federal election, Thatcher was elected to Parliament representing Moose Jaw.

Thatcher grew increasingly uncomfortable in the CCF. Despite the party itself moderating its socialist foundations and embracing a mixed-economy model, Thatcher consistently found himself on the pro-business right wing of the party caucus. He gradually shifted away from the party, and became known for publicly breaking ranks with the CCF on policy issues. In 1955, Thatcher finally left the CCF over the issue of corporate taxation. When he left the caucus, Thatcher pronounced that he was "opposed to Socialism and all it stands for". He sat as an Independent MP for the rest of the term, before running unsuccessfully for the federal Liberal Party in the 1957 and 1958 elections; he lost both times to the CCF's Hazen Argue.

=== Mossbank debate and provincial politics (1957–64) ===
During the 1957 federal campaign, Thatcher attacked the Saskatchewan CCF government's affinity for crown corporations, describing them as a dismal failure. In response, Saskatchewan premier Tommy Douglas challenged Thatcher to a debate, which ultimately took place in the town of Mossbank and was broadcast by television and radio across the province. The debate was widely regarded as a draw. However, the Liberals were buoyed by Thatcher holding his own against Douglas, who was renowned for his oratory. The debate established Thatcher as the province's principal CCF antagonist and free enterprise standard-bearer, and gave Liberals hope that they might challenge for government against the popular CCF.

After his defeats at the federal level, Thatcher was courted by the Saskatchewan Liberal Party and became its leader in 1959, defeating three rivals—Wilf Gardiner, Frank Foley, and Alex Cameron—in a contested leadership election. While some in the party resented Thatcher's quick ascension to the leadership over long-time Liberals, his victory also created excitement among the party ranks. Thatcher led the party into the 1960 provincial election, which was fought principally over the issue of Medicare, with the CCF planning to implement the first universal healthcare plan in Canada. The Liberals campaigned against Medicare, finding that they could not make a significant dent in the Saskatchewan CCF's large majority. Thatcher himself was elected to the Legislative Assembly from the rural southern riding of Morse.

The Liberals had gained momentum, however, and the anti-CCF opposition coalesced around them. This was particularly evident during the 1962 Saskatchewan doctors' strike, which attempted to derail the implementation of Medicare and hurt the CCF's popularity. In addition, Douglas, premier since 1944, stepped down in November 1961 after he was elected leader of the nascent federal New Democratic Party. The Liberals won a string of by-elections over the following three years in the lead up to the next general election.

=== Premier of Saskatchewan (1964–71) ===
Ahead of the 1964 provincial election, the Liberals campaigned on growing economic development in the province; Thatcher also wooed Progressive Conservative voters and worked to limit competition between free-enterprise candidates. Thatcher's Liberals went on to win a narrow victory that ended 20 years of CCF-NDP government. The popular vote was a virtual tie between the Liberals and the CCF; however, the distribution of the Liberals' votes and a sharp decline in Social Credit support allowed the Liberals to win a six-seat majority, making Thatcher the province's sixth Liberal premier and ninth overall.

Thatcher's government sold several crown corporations and declared the province "open for business" by encouraging private investment in the potash and other industries. His approach to potash led to a rapid expansion of the industry in the latter half of the 1960s—the industry grew so rapidly that Thatcher eventually opted to negotiate a minimum price and production cap with American producers to avoid prices collapsing from oversupply. Thatcher was known to boast that potash would become for Saskatchewan what oil was for neighbouring Alberta. On economic issues, Thatcher's government was classically liberal, and was well to the right of the federal Liberals. Thatcher often clashed with the federal Liberal governments of Lester Pearson and Pierre Trudeau over agricultural policy, social welfare policies—which the federal party supported and Thatcher opposed—and constitutional reform, as well as the federal Liberals' attempts to form a federal political organization in the province separate from the provincial party.

Thatcher also focused on downsizing the province's robust civil service. During Thatcher's tenure, veteran Saskatchewan civil servants were known to move to other provinces or to the federal civil service—which at the time was expanding the federal welfare state—and these migrants became known in government circles as the "Saskatchewan Mafia". Thatcher himself became renowned for being a "ruthless" leader that "ruled the Liberal caucus with an iron fist" and ran what came to be seen as a "one-man government".

Thatcher's Liberals were re-elected with a slightly-increased majority in a snap election called in 1967. Thatcher then surprised observers by introducing an austerity program, which cut government services, increased taxes, and introduced medicare user fees. The provincial economy, which was still heavily resource-based, experienced a downturn, and reduced government investment hurt both the potash and agriculture industries, while oil and uranium production dropped as well. Thatcher's administration became increasingly unpopular as a result. Thatcher pitched the next election, which took place in June 1971, as a stark choice between capitalism and socialism, promising for his part to continue running government like a business. For their part, the NDP campaigned on increasing public ownership of resources and state-led development. Although the Liberal vote share remained steady, they were defeated by Allan Blakeney's NDP, who were helped by an increased voter turnout and the collapse of the Progressive Conservative vote. David Steuart, Thatcher's top cabinet minister who would succeed him as Liberal leader later that year, quipped after the loss that, "If there was someone or some group that we hadn't alienated by the election of 1971, it was because we hadn't met them yet."

In the aftermath of the election, Thatcher announced to the party that he intended to resign as Liberal leader, placing a one-year limit on the search for a successor.

== Death ==
In July 1971, only weeks after his election defeat, Thatcher died at his home in Regina, apparently as a result of complications from diabetes and a heart condition. His death shocked the Saskatchewan public, and JoAnn Thatcher, then-wife of the former premier's son Colin Thatcher, later claimed she suspected the death was a suicide. However, it was an open secret that Thatcher had largely refused to deal with his diabetes. A former aide told reporters that Thatcher's health had been so run down that his death from natural causes surprised few insiders.

== Family ==
Thatcher's widow, Peggie Thatcher, was persuaded to run for the federal Liberals in the 1972 federal election, but came third in the Regina East riding.

=== Colin Thatcher ===
In the 1975 provincial election, Colin Thatcher was elected in Thunder Creek, a new constituency that contained parts of the riding that his father had represented. Although he was first elected as a Liberal, he later crossed the floor to the Progressive Conservatives before joining government after the PCs won the 1982 provincial election. Thatcher resigned in January 1983 following a brief stint as a cabinet minister in the PC government; his ex-wife JoAnn Wilson was found murdered days later, and in 1984 Thatcher was charged with murder for her death. He was convicted of first degree murder by the jury in the Saskatchewan Court of Queen's Bench and sentenced to life in prison for 25 years. His appeals to the Saskatchewan Court of Appeal and the Supreme Court of Canada were dismissed.

== Electoral history ==
Thatcher ranks eighth out of the fifteen Saskatchewan premiers for time in office at 7 years, 39 days. He was the sixth and last Liberal premier of the province. Thatcher led the Liberal Party in four provincial elections, in 1960, 1964, 1967 and 1971; he was defeated in his first election in 1960—he was Leader of the Opposition from 1960 to 1964—but won the next two elections in 1964 and 1967 with majority governments. Following his defeat in the general election of 1971, he was succeeded as Premier by Allan Blakeney, leader of the New Democratic Party (NDP).

=== Provincial elections ===
Electoral history of Liberal Party under Ross Thatcher
Year	Party	Votes			Seats		Position
Year	Party	Total	%	±%	Total	±	Position
1960	Liberal	221,932	32.7%	+21.4%	17 / 55	+3	Official Opposition
1964	Liberal	269,402	40.4%	+7.7%	32 / 59	+15	Majority government
1967	Liberal	193,871	45.6%	+5.2%	35 / 59	+3	Majority government
1971	Liberal	193,864	42.8%	−2.8%	15 / 60	−20	Official Opposition

Constituency elections
E Elected
X Incumbent

General Election, June 23, 1971: Morse
Party	Candidate	Popular Vote	%
Liberal	E X Ross Thatcher	3,502	55.72%
New Democratic Party	Paul Warren Beach	2,783	44.28%
Total		6,285	100.00%
Source: Saskatchewan Archives — Election Results by Electoral Division — Morse

General Election, October 11, 1967: Morse
Party	Candidate	Popular Vote	%
Liberal	E X Ross Thatcher	3,396	52.34%
New Democratic Party	Louis H. Lewry	2,398	36.96%
Progressive Conservative	Earl Cooper	694	10.70%
Total		6,488	100.00%
Source: Saskatchewan Archives — Election Results by Electoral Division — Morse

General Election, April 22, 1964: Morse
Party	Candidate	Popular Vote	%
Liberal	E X Ross Thatcher	3,188	51.92%
Co-operative Commonwealth Federation	Paul Warren Beach	2,952	48.08%
Total		6,140	100.00%
Source: Saskatchewan Archives — Election Results by Electoral Division — Morse

General Election, June 8, 1960: Morse
Party	Candidate	Popular Vote	%
Liberal	E Ross Thatcher	2,791	42.29%
Co-operative Commonwealth Federation	Robert Davis	2,629	39.83%
Social Credit	Peter Harder	657	9.95%
Progressive Conservative	George Gurney	523	7.92%
Total		6,600	99.99%^{1}
Source: Saskatchewan Archives — Election Results by Electoral Division - Morse

^{1} Rounding error

=== Federal elections ===
Thatcher stood for election to the House of Common five times, in three different Saskatchewan ridings. He was elected three times and defeated twice. He first stood for election as a member of the CCF, and was elected three times, in 1945, 1949, and 1953. Part way through his third term as a Member of Parliament, he left the CCF and sat as an independent, from 1955 to 1957. He then ran as a Liberal in the general elections of 1957 and 1958, but was defeated both times.

E Elected
X Incumbent

Federal Election, 1958: Assiniboia
Party	Candidate	Popular Vote	%
Co-operative Commonwealth Federation	E X Hazen Robert Argue	9,104	42.08%
Progressive Conservative	W.J. Ferguson	6,360	29.39%
Liberal	Ross Thatcher	6,173	28.53%
Total		21,637	100.00%
Source: Library of Parliament — Assiniboia

Federal Election, 1957: Assiniboia
Party	Candidate	Popular Vote	%
Co-operative Commonwealth Federation	E X Hazen Robert Argue	10,389	47.04%
Liberal	Ross Thatcher	8,862	40.13%
Progressive Conservative	W.J. Ferguson	1,931	8.74%
Social Credit	Anthony Batza	903	4.09%
Total		22,085	100.00%
Source: Library of Parliament — Assiniboia

Federal Election, 1953: Moose Jaw—Lake Centre
Party	Candidate	Popular Vote	%
Co-operative Commonwealth Federation^{1}	E Ross Thatcher	12,436	52.41%
Liberal	James Lawrence Gemmell	6,021	25.37%
Progressive Conservative	James Ernest Pascoe	4,480	18.88%
Labour-Progressive	Frederick Nelson Clarke	792	3.34%
Total		23,729	100.0%
Source: Library of Parliament – Moose Jaw—Lake Centre

^{1} Elected as a member of the CCF, but left the CFF caucus in 1955 and sat as an independent for the rest of the term.

Federal Election, 1949: Moose Jaw
Party	Candidate	Popular Vote	%
Co-operative Commonwealth Federation	E X Ross Thatcher	10,026	48.17%
Liberal	Edward Langdon Pudden	7,444	35.76%
Progressive Conservative	Leila Elsie Smiley	3,344	16.07%
Total		20,814	100.00%
Source: Library of Parliament – Moose Jaw

Federal Election, 1945: Moose Jaw
Party	Candidate	Popular Vote	%
Co-operative Commonwealth Federation	E Ross Thatcher	9,831	49.03%
Liberal	X John Gordon Ross	5,862	29.24%
Progressive Conservative	Frederick James Gilmour	4,358	21.73%
Total		20,051	100.00%
Source: Library of Parliament – Moose Jaw

== See also ==
- List of premiers of Saskatchewan
