= Jack Wiebe =

Canadian politician

The Honourable Jack Wiebe SOM

Canadian Senator from Saskatchewan
- In office April 7, 2000 – January 31, 2004
- Nominated by: Jean Chrétien

18th Lieutenant Governor of Saskatchewan
- In office May 31, 1994 – February 21, 2000
- Monarch: Elizabeth II
- Governors General: Ray Hnatyshyn; Roméo LeBlanc; Adrienne Clarkson
- Premier: Roy Romanow
- Preceded by: Sylvia Fedoruk
- Succeeded by: Lynda Haverstock

Member of the Legislative Assembly of Saskatchewan for Morse
- In office December 1, 1971 – October 18, 1978
- Preceded by: Ross Thatcher
- Succeeded by: Reginald John Gross

Personal details
- Born: John Edward Neil Wiebe; May 31, 1936 Herbert, Saskatchewan, Canada
- Died: April 16, 2007 (aged 70) Swift Current, Saskatchewan, Canada
- Party: Liberal
- Other political affiliations: Saskatchewan Liberal

John Edward Neil "Jack" Wiebe SOM (May 31, 1936 – April 16, 2007) was a Canadian farmer and politician. He served as a provincial politician, the 18th lieutenant governor of Saskatchewan and also as was appointed to the Senate of Canada.

== Early life and career ==
Born in Herbert, Saskatchewan, Wiebe graduated from the University of Saskatchewan after which he founded a major farming operation in Main Centre and was owner and president of L&W Feeders Ltd. from 1970 to 1985. He attended Luther College high school and graduated in 1953.

He was a third generation resident of Herbert. His great-grandfather, Jacob Wiebe, a Low German Mennonite, emigrated from Russia to Kansas in 1874. His grandfather, John F.D. Wiebe, settled in Saskatchewan in 1905 and became Herbert's first mayor when the community was incorporated as a township in 1912. His father, Herbert Wiebe, was elected mayor in 1928 and held the post until 1954.

== Political career ==
He was elected as a Liberal in a 1971 by-election as a Member of the Legislative Assembly of Saskatchewan for the constituency of Morse. He was re-elected in 1975 and retired from the legislature in 1978.

From 1994 to 2000, he was Lieutenant Governor of Saskatchewan, carrying out such duties as reading the Speech from the Throne, swearing in premiers and Cabinet ministers, opening legislative sessions, and bestowing honours upon Saskatchewan citizens.

In 2000, he was appointed by Jean Chrétien to the Senate representing the senatorial division of Saskatchewan. It was highly unusual for a former vice-regal representative to return to party politics so quickly. He sat as a federal Liberal and resigned in 2004, seven years before the mandatory retirement age, for family reasons.

Upon his retirement, Wiebe volunteered his time with the Dr. Noble Irwin Regional Healthcare Foundation, helping to raise millions of dollars to furnish the new regional hospital in Swift Current, Saskatchewan.

== Death ==
Wiebe died on April 16, 2007, aged 70, from lung cancer. A state memorial service was held on April 24 in Swift Current.

Coat of arms of Jack Wiebe
Crest Issuant from a circle of prairie lily flowers proper a demi lion Gules wearing a coronet erablé Or bearing in the dexter paw a leek Vert; Escutcheon Azure three bends tapissé of wheat Or; Supporters On grassy hills Vert set behind a field of durum wheat Or rising above barry wavy Azure and Argent dexter a horse Argent unguled Or gorged with a coronet erablé Vert pendant therefrom a pomeis charged with a representation of the mace of the Legislative Assembly of the Province of Saskatchewan Or sinister a deer Argent attired and unguled Or gorged with the same collar and pendant; Motto FROM FAMILY TO COMMUNITY

== See also ==
- Monarchy in Saskatchewan
- Government House (Saskatchewan)
