= Benjamin Thomas Hyde =

Canadian politician

Benjamin Thomas Hyde (July 7, 1884 – March 29, 1982) was an English-born political figure in Saskatchewan. He represented Morse from 1938 to 1944 in the Legislative Assembly of Saskatchewan as a Liberal.

He was born in Bloxham, the son of Albert Hyde and Roda Carter, and was educated in Oxfordshire. Hyde came to Canada in 1904. In 1908, he married a Miss Bell. Hyde served as reeve of the local municipal council. He lived in Eskbank, Saskatchewan. Hyde was defeated by Sidney Merlin Spidell when he ran for reelection to the provincial assembly in 1944.

He died in Burnaby, British Columbia, in 1982.
