= Reginald John Gross =

Canadian politician (born 1948)

Reginald John "Reg" Gross (born October 3, 1948) is a consultant and former political figure in Saskatchewan, Canada. He represented Gravelbourg from 1971 to 1975 and Morse from 1978 to 1982 in the Legislative Assembly of Saskatchewan as a New Democratic Party (NDP) member.

He was born in Vanguard, Saskatchewan, the son of Edward William Gross and Emilie T. Biesick, both natives of Germany. In 1974, he married Debbie McDonald. Gross was defeated by Jack Wiebe when he ran in the Morse provincial riding in 1975 and then defeated Wiebe in the 1978 general election. He served in the Saskatchewan cabinet as Minister of Tourism and Renewable Resources and as Minister of Government Services. Gross was defeated by Harold Martens when he ran for reelection in 1982.

He established and is head of C-Green Aggregators, an agricultural carbon credit trading firm. As of 2012, Gross was a vice-president of Points West Consulting Inc.
