= David Steuart =

Canadian politician

The Honourable David Steuart

Leader of the Opposition in Saskatchewan
- In office 1971–1976
- Preceded by: Allan Blakeney
- Succeeded by: Ted Malone

Member of the Legislative Assembly of Saskatchewan for Prince Albert, Prince Albert-Duck Lake
- In office 1962–1977
- Preceded by: Larry McIntosh
- Succeeded by: Norm Wipf

Personal details
- Born: David Gordon Steuart; January 26, 1916 Regina, Saskatchewan, Canada
- Died: November 5, 2010 (aged 94) Kelowna, British Columbia, Canada
- Party: Liberal
- Spouse: Eunice Mary Cooke (m. 1936)

David Gordon "Davey" Steuart (January 26, 1916 – November 5, 2010) was a Saskatchewan politician, cabinet minister and senator.

== Early life and career ==
Born in Regina, Saskatchewan, the son of Francis J. Steuart and Abbie Cory Thomas, Steuart moved to Prince Albert with his family in 1936. In the same year, he married Eunice Mary Cooke. Steuart served as a navigator in the Royal Canadian Air Force during World War II. He was elected to Prince Albert city council in 1951 and served as mayor from 1954 to 1958. He also served as president of the Saskatchewan Urban Municipalities Association.

== Political career ==
A member of the Saskatchewan Liberal Party's provincial executive he helped former Co-operative Commonwealth Federation MP Ross Thatcher win the Liberal Party's leadership convention in 1959 and also became president of the party that year.

He failed in his 1960 bid to win a seat in the Saskatchewan legislature but won a by-election two years later and retained the Prince Albert seat in the 1964 provincial election that brought the Thatcher Liberals to power.

Steuart was appointed Minister of Health in the provincial cabinet implementing the government's system of user fees for health care and, in 1965, became Minister of Natural Resources and Deputy Premier. In 1967, he became Minister of Finance.

Steuart's budgets were blamed for the Liberal Party's defeat in the 1971 provincial election. Nevertheless, Steuart was elected party leader in December 1971 following Thatcher's death. He served as Leader of the Opposition for four years resigning the party leadership two days after the 1975 provincial election in which the party was badly defeated.

He was appointed to the Canadian Senate in December 1976 and served until his retirement in 1991, when he moved to Kelowna, British Columbia.

== Death ==
Steuart died at home in Kelowna on November 5, 2010, at the age of 94.
