= William Paris MacLachlan =

Canadian politician

- W.P. MacLachlan Circa 1925

Member of the Legislative Assembly of Saskatchewan for Morse

Personal details
- Born: April 3, 1878 Pakenham, Ontario
- Party: Liberal
- Occupation: Farmer

William Paris MacLachlan (April 3, 1878 – 1927) was a farmer and political figure in Saskatchewan. He represented Morse from 1925 to 1927 in the Legislative Assembly of Saskatchewan as a Liberal.

He was born in Pakenham, Ontario near White Lake, Ontario, the son of Thomas MacLachlan and Agnes Paris, and was educated there. MacLachlan was married twice: first to Rachel Evans in 1910, daughter of George Evans, Pakenham, Ontario and then to Nellie Jane McLachlan of Reston, Manitoba in 1919 after the death of his first wife from the flu epidemic. Mr. MacLachlan had six children with his first wife, Mary Agnes, Paris James, George Evan, Jean Rachael, Margaret Wilhelmina, Isabella Elizabeth.

After his father's death, Mr. MacLachlan moved West in 1905 with his Mother and siblings to established land claims in what was known as the Eyebrow Hill area before being renamed Eskbank, Saskatchewan when the Canadian National (CN) rail line was established and ran right alongside the town site. There were three grain elevators build on the rail line at Eskbank.

He served on the council for the rural municipality of Eyebrow No. 193 and was reeve from 1921 to 1924. He ran unsuccessfully for the Swift Current—Maple Creek seat in the Canadian House of Commons in 1921. MacLachlan lived in Eskbank, Saskatchewan. He achieved more political success in the 1925 Provincial election on behalf of the Liberal Party for the Constituency of Morse, Saskatchewan in Premier Charles Avery Dunning government for the Constituency of Moose Jaw, Saskatchewan. Mr. Dunning joined the Federal Liberal Party with Sir Lyon McKenzie King in 1926 and was succeeded by James Garfield Gardiner as the 4th Premier of Saskatchewan in 1926.

William Paris MacLachlan died at home on the farm on June 21, 1927 while serving in office.

Mr. MacLachlan was also a member of Regina Consistory, Moose Jaw Scottish Rite, Eyebrow Masonic Lodge No 67.

On October 16, 1968 The Province of Saskatchewan, Department of Natural Resources under Minister Eiling Kramer, designated "MacLachlan Lake" Longitude 55" 50" and Latitude 104" 23' after W.P. MacLachlan and his dedicated service to the Province of Saskatchewan. The scroll presented to the family reads; "Saskatchewan's finest resource is the character and quality of her peoples: It is appropriate that her geographical features perpetuate the names and honour the work of those prominent in development of the Province, and those who gave dedicated service to fellow citizens."

One of his first Cousins was J.P. Bickell who shared the same middle name of "Paris" which was their mothers maiden name. Mr. Bickell was one of the great Canadian industrialists of his era.
