= David Hadley Lange =

Canadian politician

David Hadley Lange (born 1947) is a former Canadian provincial politician. He was the NDP member of the Legislative Assembly of Saskatchewan for the constituency of Assiniboia-Bengough, from 1971 until 1975 and for the constituency of Bengough-Milestone from 1975 until 1978. He was the first and only representative of Assiniboia-Bengough, as it was replaced before the next election by the ridings of Bengough-Milestone and Assiniboia-Gravelbourg. Following the dissolution of the Assiniboia-Bengough riding, he was elected as representative for the newly created constituency of Bengough-Milestone. He did not run in the 1978 election and was replaced as representative of Bengough-Milestone by Progressive Conservative Robert Hugh Pickering.
