= Karl Frank Klein =

Canadian politician

Karl Frank Klein (October 17, 1922 – June 22, 2006) was an educator, farmer and political figure in Saskatchewan. He represented Notukeu-Willow Bunch from 1956 to 1964 in the Legislative Assembly of Saskatchewan as a Liberal.

He was born in Lafleche, Saskatchewan. Klein served overseas as a wireless operator in the Royal Canadian Navy during World War II. After the war, he attended teacher's college and received a degree in education from the University of Manitoba. In 1948, Klein married Agnes McCarthy.
