= John Richards (scholar) =

Canadian politician

John Guyon Richards

MLA for Saskatoon University
- In office 1971–1975
- Preceded by: first member
- Succeeded by: riding dissolved

Personal details
- Born: August 19, 1944 (age 81) Exeter, Devon, England
- Party: New Democrat → Independent
- Occupation: University professor

John Guyon Richards (born August 19, 1944) is a Canadian politician and professor at Simon Fraser University (SFU) in British Columbia. During the 1970s, he served as an elected member of the legislature in the province of Saskatchewan, representing the electoral district of Saskatoon University from 1971 to 1975.

A member of the social democratic New Democratic Party (NDP), Richards was for a time the only elected official who supported The Waffle, a group of intellectuals and students who tried to push the NDP further to the left. He left the NDP in 1973 over its refusal to nationalize the potash industry, and sat as an independent socialist until the next election, when he was defeated in the new district of Saskatoon Centre and turned to academia.

In recent decades Richards's views have moderated, and he became an early exponent of the 'Third Way' politics popularized by UK Labour Party leader Tony Blair. He remains one of Canada's foremost political intellectuals, writing and editing a series of books and articles that suggest the development of more pragmatic social democratic politics, in addition to work on aboriginal policy, the energy sector, language policy, federalism, and international development.

Richards was instrumental in the creation of a new school of public policy at SFU and volunteers for a small university in Bangladesh, a country he has been visiting since the early nineteen nineties. He has worked with the National Democratic Institute, an American-based democracy-building organization, in Bangladesh, Cambodia and Nepal.
