= Irving Wensley Carlson =

Canadian politician

Irving Wensley Carlson (born 1941) is a former farmer, railway worker and political figure in Saskatchewan. He represented Yorkton from 1971 to 1975 in the Legislative Assembly of Saskatchewan as a New Democratic Party (NDP) member.

He was born in Melville, Saskatchewan and attended the University of Saskatchewan, receiving a BSc degree in agriculture. He farmed and worked for the Canadian National Railway. Carlson ran unsuccessfully for a seat in the provincial assembly in 1967 before being elected in 1971. In 1973, he was named parliamentary secretary to Jack Messer.

Carlson was campaign manager for Lorne Nystrom when he was elected to the Canadian House of Commons for Yorkton—Melville in 1968 and 1972.
