= Morse (electoral district) =

Former provincial electoral district in Saskatchewan, Canada

Coordinates: 50°27′N 107°00′W

Morse is a former provincial electoral division for the Legislative Assembly of the province of Saskatchewan, Canada, centred on the town of Morse, Saskatchewan. The district was created before the 3rd Saskatchewan general election in 1912, and abolished before the 23rd Saskatchewan general election in 1995. It was the riding of Premier Ross Thatcher.

It is now part of the Lumsden-Morse, Swift Current, and Wood River constituencies.

== Members of the Legislative Assembly ==
#	MLA	Served	Party
1.	Malcolm L. Leitch	1912 – 1921	Liberal
2.	John Archibald Maharg	1921 – 1925	Independent Pro-Government
3.	William Paris MacLachlan	1925 – 1927	Liberal
4.	Duncan Morris Robertson	Aug. 1927 – 1929	Liberal
5.	Richard Percy Eades	1929 – 1934	Conservative
6.	Neil John MacDonald	1934 – 1938	Liberal
7.	Benjamin T. Hyde	1938 – 1944	Liberal
8.	Sidney M. Spidell	1944 – 1946	CCF
9.	Jim Gibson	Sept. 1946 – 1960	CCF
10.	Ross Thatcher	1960 – 1971	Liberal
11.	Jack Wiebe	1971 – 1978	Liberal
12.	Reg Gross	1978 – 1982	New Democrat
13.	Harold Martens	1982 – 1995	Progressive Conservative

== Election results ==
1912 Saskatchewan general election: Morse electoral district
Party	Candidate	Votes	%	±%
Liberal	Malcolm L. Leitch	876	61.52%	–
Conservative	Henry M. Klassen	548	38.48%	–
Total		1,424	100.00%	

1917 Saskatchewan general election: Morse electoral district
Party	Candidate	Votes	%	±%
Liberal	Malcolm L. Leitch	1,553	34.45%	-27.07
Nonpartisan League	Edward Wright Grainger	1,425	31.61%	–
Conservative	Henry Edmund Houze	871	19.32%	-19.16
Independent	John F. Wiebe	659	14.62%	–
Total		4,508	100.00%	

1921 Saskatchewan general election: Morse electoral district
Party	Candidate	Votes	%	±%
Independent Pro-Government	John Archibald Maharg	Acclaimed	100.00%	
Total		Acclamation		

1925 Saskatchewan general election: Morse electoral district
Party	Candidate	Votes	%	±%
Liberal	William Paris MacLachlan	2,480	65.26%	-
Progressive	John Ferguson Byce	1,320	34.74%	-
Total		3,800	100.00%	

August 15, 1927 By-Election: Morse electoral district
Party	Candidate	Votes	%	±%
Liberal	Duncan Morris Robertson	Acclaimed	100.00%	
Total		Acclamation		

1929 Saskatchewan general election: Morse electoral district
Party	Candidate	Votes	%	±%
Conservative	Richard Percy Eades	2,814	51.51%	-
Liberal	Duncan Morris Robertson	2,649	48.49%	-
Total		5,463	100.00%	

1934 Saskatchewan general election: Morse electoral district
Party	Candidate	Votes	%	±%
Liberal	Neil John MacDonald	2,717	46.06%	-2.43
Conservative	Richard Percy Eades	1,752	29.70%	-21.81
Farmer-Labour	John McCaig	1,430	24.24%	–
Total		5,899	100.00%	

1938 Saskatchewan general election: Morse electoral district
Party	Candidate	Votes	%	±%
Liberal	Benjamin T. Hyde	2,861	43.59%	-2.47
CCF	Henry Peter Thiessen	1,808	27.55%	+3.31
Conservative	Clifford B. Martin	1,416	21.58%	-8.12
Social Credit	William E. Armstrong	478	7.28%	–
Total		6,563	100.00%	

1944 Saskatchewan general election: Morse electoral district
Party	Candidate	Votes	%	±%
CCF	Sidney M. Spidell	2,763	49.25%	+21.70
Liberal	Benjamin T. Hyde	2,122	37.83%	-5.76
Prog. Conservative	Clifford B. Martin	725	12.92%	-8.66
Total		5,610	100.00%	

June 27, 1946 By-Election: Morse electoral district
Party	Candidate	Votes	%	±%
CCF	Jim Gibson	3,006	46.15%	-3.10
Liberal	Herbert Wiebe	2,410	37.00%	-0.83
Prog. Conservative	Rupert D. Ramsay	1,098	16.85%	+3.93
Total		6,514	100.00%	

1948 Saskatchewan general election: Morse electoral district
Party	Candidate	Votes	%	±%
CCF	Jim Gibson	3,069	45.75%	-0.40
Liberal	Ronald D. Miller	2,465	36.74%	-0.26
Social Credit	Fred Erhardt	694	10.34%	-
Prog. Conservative	John Kinchen Rosa	481	7.17%	-9.68
Total		6,709	100.00%	

1952 Saskatchewan general election: Morse electoral district
Party	Candidate	Votes	%	±%
CCF	Jim Gibson	3,263	56.58%	+10.83
Liberal	David S. Gall	2,504	43.42%	+6.68
Total		5,767	100.00%	

1956 Saskatchewan general election: Morse electoral district
Party	Candidate	Votes	%	±%
CCF	Jim Gibson	2,590	42.55%	-14.03
Liberal	Earl Burgess	2,352	38.64%	-4.78
Social Credit	Gustav Pilzer	1,145	18.81%	-
Total		6,087	100.00%	

1960 Saskatchewan general election: Morse electoral district
Party	Candidate	Votes	%	±%
Liberal	Ross Thatcher	2,791	42.29%	+3.65
CCF	Robert Davis	2,629	39.83%	-2.72
Social Credit	Peter Harder	657	9.96%	-8.85
Prog. Conservative	George Gurney	523	7.92%	-
Total		6,600	100.00%	

1964 Saskatchewan general election: Morse electoral district
Party	Candidate	Votes	%	±%
Liberal	Ross Thatcher	3,188	51.92%	+9.63
CCF	Paul W. Beach	2,952	48.08%	+8.25
Total		6,140	100.00%	

1967 Saskatchewan general election: Morse electoral district
Party	Candidate	Votes	%	±%
Liberal	Ross Thatcher	3,396	52.34%	+0.42
NDP	Louis H. Lewry	2,398	36.96%	-11.12
Prog. Conservative	Earl Cooper	694	10.70%	-
Total		6,488	100.00%	

1971 Saskatchewan general election: Morse electoral district
Party	Candidate	Votes	%	±%
Liberal	Ross Thatcher	3,502	55.72%	+3.38
NDP	Paul W. Beach	2,783	44.28%	+7.32
Total		6,285	100.00%	

December 1, 1971 By-Election: Morse electoral district
Party	Candidate	Votes	%	±%
Liberal	Jack Wiebe	2,700	47.75%	-7.97
NDP	James R. Murdoch	2,274	40.22%	-4.02
Progressive Conservative	Edward Nasserden	680	12.03%	-
Total		5,654	100.00%	

1975 Saskatchewan general election: Morse electoral district
Party	Candidate	Votes	%	±%
Liberal	Jack Wiebe	2,517	36.66%	-11.09
NDP	Reg Gross	2,502	36.44%	-3.78
Progressive Conservative	Harold Martens	1,847	26.90%	+14.87
Total		6,866	100.00%	

1978 Saskatchewan general election: Morse electoral district
Party	Candidate	Votes	%	±%
NDP	Reg Gross	2,587	37.97%	+1.53
Progressive Conservative	Harold Martens	2,203	32.33%	+5.43
Liberal	Jack Wiebe	2,024	29.70%	-6.96
Total		6,814	100.00%	

1982 Saskatchewan general election: Morse electoral district
Party	Candidate	Votes	%	±%
Progressive Conservative	Harold Martens	3,565	49.94%	+17.61
NDP	Reg Gross	2,409	33.75%	-4.22
Western Canada Concept	Ray L. Bailey	887	12.43%	–
Liberal	Don Meyer	277	3.88%	-25.82
Total		7,138	100.00%	

1986 Saskatchewan general election: Morse electoral district
Party	Candidate	Votes	%	±%
Progressive Conservative	Harold Martens	3,694	56.12%	+6.18
NDP	Reg Gross	2,209	33.56%	-0.19
Liberal	Al Harder	605	9.19%	+5.31
Western Canada Concept	Burton Rempel	74	1.13%	-11.30
Total		6,582	100.00%	

1991 Saskatchewan general election: Morse electoral district
Party	Candidate	Votes	%	±%
Progressive Conservative	Harold Martens	2,682	44.42%	-11.70
NDP	Carl Siemens	2,101	34.80%	+1.24
Liberal	Ken Nelson	1,255	20.78%	+11.59
Total		6,038	100.00%	

== See also ==
- List of Saskatchewan provincial electoral districts
- List of Saskatchewan general elections
- Canadian provincial electoral districts
