= Norm Wipf =

Canadian politician

MLA for Prince Albert-Duck Lake
- In office 1977–1978
- Preceded by: David Steuart
- Succeeded by: Jerome Hammersmith

Personal details
- Born: April 12, 1939 (age 87) Prince Albert, Saskatchewan
- Party: Saskatchewan Progressive Conservative Party
- Occupation: insurance salesman

Garnet Norman "Norm" Wipf (born April 12, 1939) was a Canadian politician. He served in the Legislative Assembly of Saskatchewan from 1977 to 1978, as a Progressive Conservative member for the constituency of Prince Albert-Duck Lake. He is an insurance salesman.
