= Alan Embury =

Canadian politician

Alan Williams Embury (November 5, 1907 – September 22, 1978) was a lawyer, soldier and political figure in Saskatchewan. He was an Active Service Voters Representative in the Legislative Assembly of Saskatchewan from 1944 to 1948 representing members of the Canadian armed services on active duty in countries bordering the Mediterranean Sea.

He was born in Regina, Saskatchewan, the son of John Fletcher Leopold Embury and Dora A. Williams, and was educated there and at the Royal Military College in Kingston. In 1933, Embury received a law degree from the University of Saskatchewan and went on to practise law in Regina. He served overseas with the Saskatoon Light Infantry during World War II. After the war, Embury was president of the Saskatchewan Bar Association and of the Saskatchewan Branch of the Royal Canadian Legion. He also served on the board of the Salvation Army in Saskatchewan and of the Regina Public Library.
