= Niles Leonard Buchanan =

Canadian politician

Niles Leonard Buchanan (June 12, 1909 – September 16, 1987) was an American-born educator and political figure in Saskatchewan. He represented Notukeu-Willow Bunch from 1944 to 1956 in the Legislative Assembly of Saskatchewan as a Co-operative Commonwealth Federation (CCF) member.

He was born in Roberts County, South Dakota, the son of George Buchanan and Pearl Reimann, and came with his family to Saskatchewan in 1916. The family settled on a homestead in the Spring Valley district. He was educated in the district and in Moose Jaw. Buchanan taught school in Saskatchewan for 14 years. He married Emma Louise Knox in 1935.

In 1940, he ran unsuccessfully for the Wood Mountain seat in the Canadian House of Commons as a CCF candidate. Buchanan served as a lieutenant with the King's Own Rifles during World War II. He resigned his seat in 1956 after his motion for introduction of a grid road system was defeated in caucus.

After leaving politics, Buchanan worked for the Saskatchewan Power Corporation. He later moved to Vancouver, British Columbia, where he worked for BC Hydro. Buchanan returned to Regina and retired in 1974. He died there at the age of 78.
