= Henry Edmund Houze =

Canadian politician

Henry Edmund Houze (August 13, 1880 – March 16, 1959) was a Canadian veterinarian, farmer, rancher and political figure in Saskatchewan. He represented Gravelbourg from 1944 to 1948 in the Legislative Assembly of Saskatchewan as a Co-operative Commonwealth Federation (CCF) member.

He was born in Smiths Falls, Ontario and came west in 1908, settling on a homestead near Meyronne, Saskatchewan. Houze married Mabel Forest. He raised Hereford cattle and a few horses. Houze ran unsuccessfully as a Conservative candidate for the Morse seat in the provincial assembly in 1917. He moved into the town of Meyronne in 1937 but continued to farm until 1947. Houze was defeated by E. M. Culliton when he ran for reelection to the provincial assembly in 1948.
