= Peter Anton Howe =

Canadian politician

Peter Anton Howe (January 1, 1888 – February 3, 1976) was an American-born farmer and political figure in Saskatchewan. He represented Kelvington from 1938 to 1960 in the Legislative Assembly of Saskatchewan as a Co-operative Commonwealth Federation (CCF) member.

He was born in Warren, Minnesota, the son of Severine Howe and Agnetta Jorgenson, both natives of Norway, and was educated there. Howe came north to Saskatchewan with his parents, who settled near Foam Lake in 1904. In 1906, Howe settled on his own homestead. He married a Miss Narfason in 1912. Howe helped establish the Leslie Rural Telephone Company in 1916, serving three years on its board. He served on the local school board from 1917 to 1931. He also served as a local delegate to the Saskatchewan Wheat Pool. Howe served as government whip in the assembly.
