= Malcolm Dobie =

Canadian politician

Malcolm James Dobie (September 14, 1885 – October 27, 1966) was a Canadian farmer, soldier and political figure in Saskatchewan. He was an Active Service Voters' Representative in the Legislative Assembly of Saskatchewan from 1944 to 1948 representing members of the Canadian armed services on active duty in Canada outside of Saskatchewan and in Newfoundland.

He was born in North Dakota, the son of James Dobie and Jane Augusta Lawson, and came to Canada in 1905. He received the Distinguished Conduct Medal and the Military Cross for his service during World War I. In 1921, he married Jane Chisholm. From 1925 to 1930, Dobie was reeve of the rural municipality of Paynton. During World War II, he served as a member of the Veterans Guard of Canada.
