= James William Gibson =

Canadian politician (1888–1965)

James William Gibson (1888 – January 28, 1965) was a Scottish-born political figure in Saskatchewan. He represented Morse from 1946 to 1960 in the Legislative Assembly of Saskatchewan as a Co-operative Commonwealth Federation (CCF) member.

He was born in Edinburgh, the son of Mark Gibson, and came to Canada with his parents in 1904, settling on a farm near Caron. In 1917, he married Isabelle Thomson. Gibson served as secretary-treasurer for the local school district, as a member of the Caron Wheat Pool committee, as a director for the Moose Jaw Co-operative Association and as a member of the council for the rural municipality of Caron. He was an organizer for the Progressive Party and then the United Farmers of Canada in Saskatchewan. From 1946 to 1951, Gibson was the chairman of the Moose Jaw Larger School District. He was elected to the Saskatchewan assembly in a 1946 by-election held after Sidney Spidell resigned his seat. Gibson retired from politics in 1960 and moved to Caron, where he later died at the age of 76.
