= Harold Martens =

Canadian politician (1941–2023)

Harold Arthur Martens (September 8, 1941 – January 8, 2023) was a Canadian rancher, farmer and political figure in Saskatchewan. He represented Morse from 1982 to 1995 in the Legislative Assembly of Saskatchewan as a Progressive Conservative.

== Life and career ==
Martens was born in Herbert, Saskatchewan on September 8, 1941, the son of Eugene and Lydia Martens. Martens served on the council for the rural municipality of Saskatchewan Landing, serving as reeve from 1977 to 1978. He was also a member of the senate for the University of Regina. Martens served in the Saskatchewan cabinet as Associate Minister of Agriculture and Food. After the Devine government was defeated, he served as deputy opposition leader and opposition finance critic. Martens retired from provincial politics in 1995 and returned to ranching.

Martens was ordered to repay $5,850 after being found guilty in the Saskatchewan Progressive Conservative fraud scandal of the 1980s.

Martens went on to serve as reeve for the rural municipality of Excelsior. As of 2006, he was living in Swift Current. Martens later served as president of the Saskatchewan Stock Growers Association.

Martens died on January 8, 2023, at the age of 81.
