= Sidney Merlin Spidell =

Canadian politician

Sidney Merlin Spidell (December 19, 1900 – February 1997) was an educator and political figure in Saskatchewan. He represented Morse from 1944 to 1946 in the Legislative Assembly of Saskatchewan as a Co-operative Commonwealth Federation (CCF) member.

He was born in Parkdale, Nova Scotia, the son of Sidney Freeman Spidell and Lucinda Ann Saunders, and was educated in Parkdale, in Mortlach, Saskatchewan and at the University of Saskatchewan. Spidell married Mildred Hazel Johnson in 1937. He was a public school and high school principal. He lived in Central Butte, Saskatchewan. Spidell resigned his seat in the provincial legislature in December 1945 and moved to eastern Canada. He died in February 1997 at the age of 96 in Fort Qu'Appelle, Saskatchewan.
