= 1971 Saskatchewan general election =

Canadian provincial election

← 1967	June 23, 1971	1975 →

60 seats in the Legislative Assembly of Saskatchewan 31 seats needed for a majority
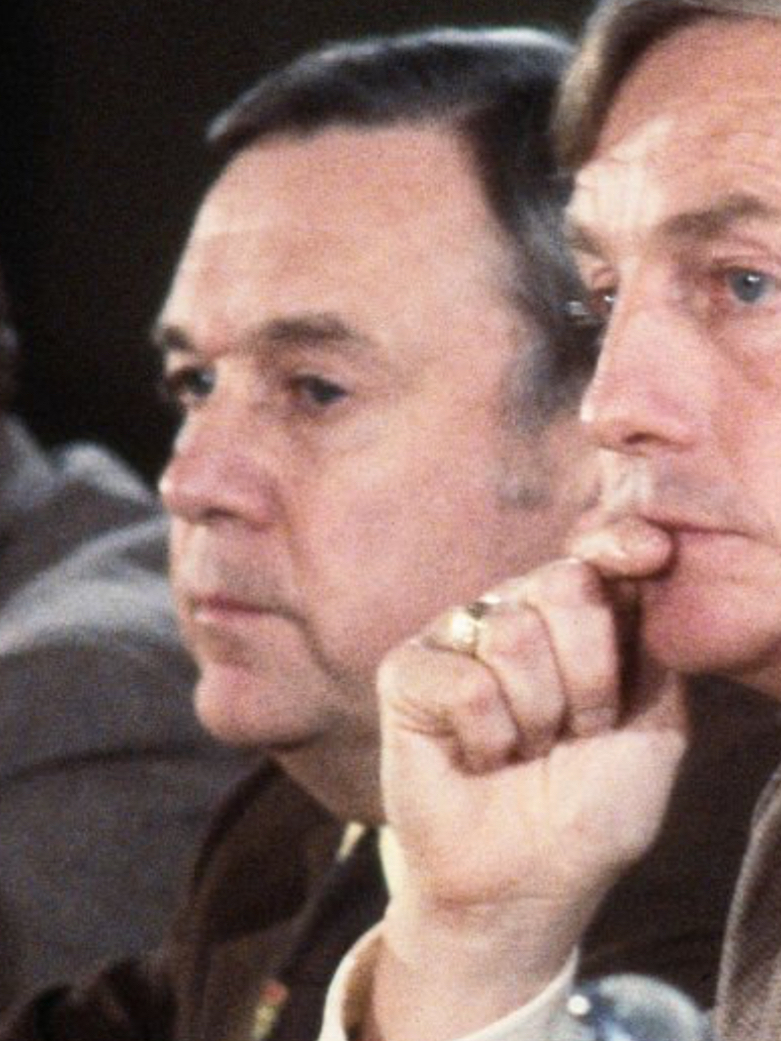

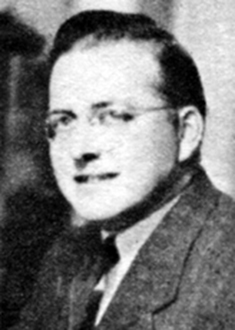
	First party	Second party
Leader	Allan Blakeney	Ross Thatcher
Party	New Democratic	Liberal
Leader since	July 4, 1970	September 24, 1959
Leader's seat	Regina Centre	Morse
Last election	24	35
Seats won	45	15
Seat change	▲21	▼20
Popular vote	248,978	193,864
Percentage	55.00%	42.82%
Swing	▲10.65pp	▼2.75pp
- Popular vote by riding. As this is an FPTP election, seat totals are not determined by popular vote, but instead via results by each riding.
Premier before election
Ross Thatcher
Liberal
Premier after election
Allan Blakeney
New Democratic

The 1971 Saskatchewan general election was held on June 23, 1971, to elect members of the Legislative Assembly of Saskatchewan.

Under the leadership of Allan Blakeney, the New Democratic Party of Saskatchewan returned to power after seven years in opposition. The NDP won a majority government, increasing its share of the popular vote by over 10 percentage points.

The Liberal government of Premier Ross Thatcher more or less held its share of the popular vote, but lost a significant number of seats in the legislature in part because of the continuing decline in the share of the vote won by the Progressive Conservative Party, now led by Ed Nasserden.

Ross Thatcher died on July 22, 1971, just shy of a month after losing the election.

== Results ==
Party	Party Leader	# of candidates	Seats			Popular Vote		
Party	Party Leader	# of candidates	1967	Elected	% Change	#	%	% Change
New Democratic	Allan Blakeney	60	24	45	+87.5%	248,978	55.00%	+10.65%
Liberal	Ross Thatcher	60	35	15	-42.9%	193,864	42.82%	-2.75%
Progressive Conservative	Ed Nasserden	16	–	–	–	9,659	2.13%	-7.65%
Independent		1	*	–	*	189	0.04%	*
Communist		1	*	–	*	46	0.01%	*
Total		138	59	60	+1.7%	452,736	100%	
Source: Elections Saskatchewan

Note: * Party did not nominate candidates in previous election.

Popular vote
New Democratic	55.00%
Liberal	42.82%
PC	2.13%
Others	0.05%

Seats summary
New Democratic	75.00%
Liberal	25.00%

== See also ==
- List of political parties in Saskatchewan
- List of Saskatchewan provincial electoral districts
