= Electoral history of Tommy Douglas =

Overview of Tommy Douglas' electoral history

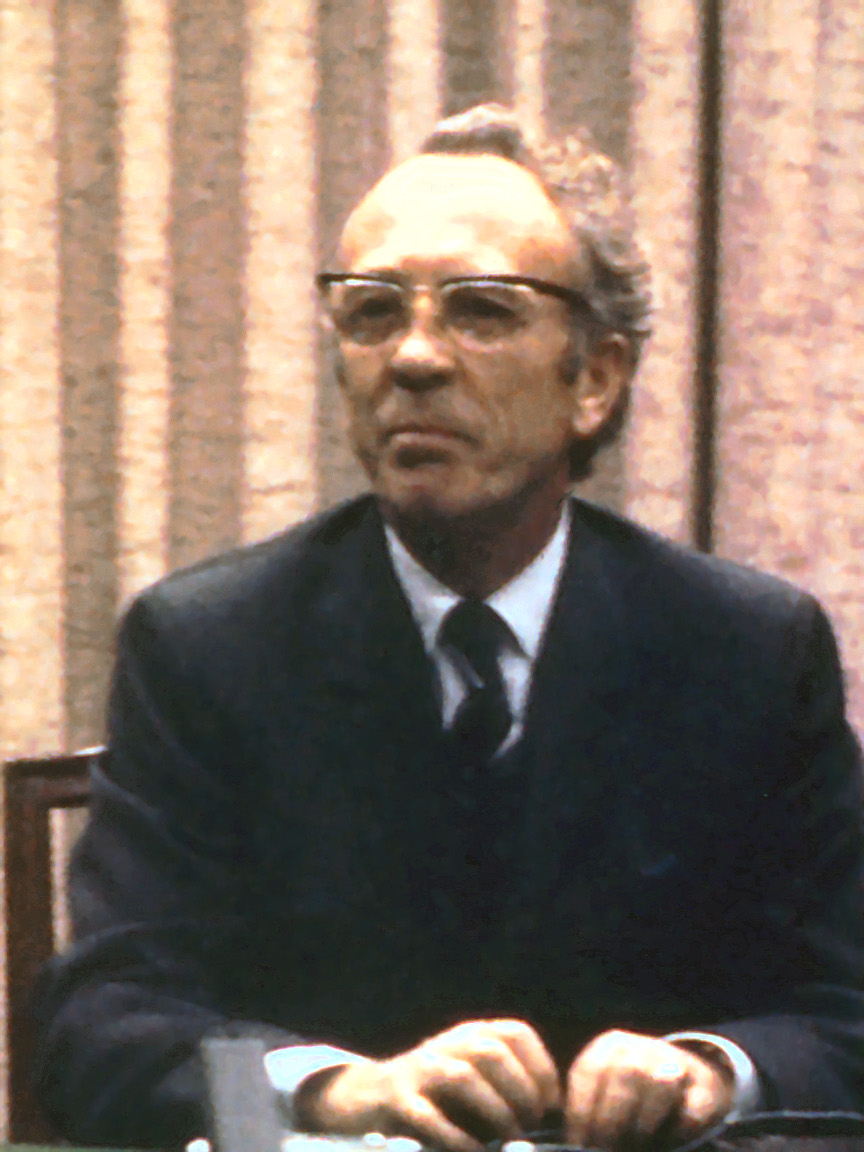
Douglas, c. 1971

This is the electoral history of Tommy Douglas, the seventh premier of Saskatchewan from 1944 to 1961.

In addition to his role as premier, Douglas was a Co-operative Commonwealth Federation (CCF) member of the Legislative Assembly of Saskatchewan during the same time period for the constituency of Weyburn. Having earlier served as a CCF member of the House of Commons of Canada for Weyburn from 1935 to 1944, Douglas re-entered federal politics in 1961 when he became the first leader of the newly-created New Democratic Party (NDP). He served as an NDP member of the House of Commons of Canada from 1962 to 1968 and 1969 to 1979, and he stepped down from the role of party leader in 1971.

== Overview ==
Electoral history of Tommy Douglas — Provincial and federal general elections
Year	Type	Party	Votes			Seats		Position
Year	Type	Party	Total	%	±%	Total	±	Position
1944	Provincial	Co-operative; Commonwealth	211,364	53.1%	+34.4%	47 / 52	+37	Majority government
1948	Provincial	Co-operative; Commonwealth	236,900	47.6%	−5.5%	31 / 52	−16	Majority government
1952	Provincial	Co-operative; Commonwealth	291,705	54.1%	+6.5%	42 / 53	+11	Majority government
1956	Provincial	Co-operative; Commonwealth	249,634	45.3%	−8.8%	36 / 53	−6	Majority government
1960	Provincial	Co-operative; Commonwealth	276,846	40.8%	−4.5%	37 / 54	+1	Majority government
1962	Federal	New Democratic	1,044,754	13.57%	N/A	19 / 265	N/A	Fourth party
1963	Federal	New Democratic	1,044,701	13.22%	−0.35%	17 / 265	−2	Fourth party
1965	Federal	New Democratic	1,381,658	17.91%	+4.69%	21 / 265	+4	Third party
1968	Federal	New Democratic	1,378,263	16.96%	−0.95%	22 / 264	+1	Third party

Electoral history of Tommy Douglas — Provincial and federal constituency elections
Year	Type	Riding	Party	Votes for Douglas				Result	Swing
Year	Type	Riding	Party	Total	%	P.	±%	Result	Swing
1934	Provincial general	Weyburn	Farmer–Labour	1,343	25.84%	3rd	N/A	Lost	Gain
1935	Federal general	Weyburn	Co-operative; Commonwealth	7,280	45.00%	1st	N/A	Elected	Gain
1940	Federal general	Weyburn	Co-operative; Commonwealth	8,509	52.10%	1st	+7.10%	Elected	Hold
1944	Provincial general	Weyburn	Co-operative; Commonwealth	5,605	61.63%	1st	N/A	Elected	Gain
1948	Provincial general	Weyburn	Co-operative; Commonwealth	6,273	56.31%	1st	−5.32%	Elected	Hold
1952	Provincial general	Weyburn	Co-operative; Commonwealth	6,020	59.86%	1st	+3.55%	Elected	Hold
1956	Provincial general	Weyburn	Co-operative; Commonwealth	4,930	48.17%	1st	−11.69%	Elected	Hold
1960	Provincial general	Weyburn	Co-operative; Commonwealth	5,054	48.43%	1st	+0.26%	Elected	Hold
1962	Federal general	Regina City	New Democratic	12,736	28.94%	2nd	N/A	Lost	Hold
1962	Federal by-election	Burnaby—Coquitlam	New Democratic	16,313	50.43%	1st	N/A	Elected	Hold
1963	Federal general	Burnaby—Coquitlam	New Democratic	19,067	46.37%	1st	−4.06%	Elected	Hold
1965	Federal general	Burnaby—Coquitlam	New Democratic	22,553	52.92%	1st	+6.55%	Elected	Hold
1968	Federal general	Burnaby—Seymour	New Democratic	17,753	44.89%	2nd	N/A	Lost	Gain
1969	Federal by-election	Nanaimo—Cowichan—The Islands	New Democratic	19,730	57.03%	1st	N/A	Elected	Hold
1972	Federal general	Nanaimo—Cowichan—The Islands	New Democratic	25,483	56.93%	1st	−0.10%	Elected	Hold

Electoral history of Tommy Douglas — party leadership elections
Year	Party	Votes	%	P.	Result
1942	Saskatchewan Co-operative Commonwealth	not announced		1st	Won
1943	Saskatchewan Co-operative Commonwealth	not announced		1st	Won
1961	Federal New Democratic Party	1,391	78.5%	1st	Won

== Provincial constituency elections ==
Douglas stood for election to the Legislative Assembly in six general elections, all in the constituency of Weyburn. He was defeated in his first election, in 1934, but was elected in the five general elections from 1944 to 1960.

=== 1934 general election ===
General Election, June 19, 1934: Weyburn
Party	Candidate	Popular Vote	%
Liberal	E Hugh Elliott Eaglesham	2,281	43.89%
Conservative	X Robert Sterritt Leslie	1,544	29.71%
Farmer–Labour	Tommy Douglas	1,343	25.84%
Independent	James Logan Coltart	29	0.56%
Total		5,197	100.00%
Source: Saskatchewan Archives — Election Results by Electoral Division

E Elected.
X Incumbent.

=== 1944 general election ===
General Election, June 15, 1944: Weyburn
Party	Candidate	Popular Vote	%
Co-operative Commonwealth Federation	E Tommy Douglas	5,605	61.63%
Liberal	James Weyburn Adolphe	3,489	38.37%
Total		9,094	100.00%
Source: Saskatchewan Archives — Election Results by Electoral Division

E Elected.

=== 1948 general election ===
General Election, June 24, 1948: Weyburn
Party	Candidate	Popular Vote	%
Co-operative Commonwealth Federation	E X Tommy Douglas	6,273	56.31%
Liberal-Progressive Conservative	Fergus Charles Eaglesham	4,228	37.96%
Social Credit	Isabel Paxman	638	5.73%
Total		11,139	100.00%
Source: Saskatchewan Archives — Election Results by Electoral Division

E Elected.
X Incumbent.

=== 1952 general election ===
General Election, June 11, 1952: Weyburn
Party	Candidate	Popular Vote	%
Co-operative Commonwealth Federation	E X Tommy Douglas	6,020	59.86%
Liberal	Donald Morrow	4,037	40.14%
Total		10,057	100.00%
Source: Saskatchewan Archives — Election Results by Electoral Division

E Elected.
X Incumbent.

=== 1956 general election ===
General Election, June 20, 1956: Weyburn
Party	Candidate	Popular Vote	%
Co-operative Commonwealth Federation	E X Tommy Douglas	4,930	48.17%
Liberal	Junior Herbert Staveley	4,234	41.37%
Social Credit	Gustav Theodore Froese	1,070	10.46%
Total		10,234	100.00%
Source: Saskatchewan Archives — Election Results by Electoral Division

E Elected.
X Incumbent.

=== 1960 general election ===
General Election, June 8, 1960: Weyburn
Party	Candidate	Popular Vote	%
Co-operative Commonwealth Federation	Yes X Tommy Douglas	5,054	48.43%
Liberal	Junior Herbert Staveley	4,453	42.67%
Progressive Conservative	Hugh McGillivray	621	5.95%
Social Credit	William Tabor	307	2.94%
Total		10,435	99.99%^{1}
Source: Saskatchewan Archives — Election Results by Electoral Division

X Elected.
X Incumbent.
^{1} Rounding error.

== Provincial general elections ==
Douglas led the CCF in five general elections: 1944, 1948, 1952, 1956 and 1960. He won a majority government each time.

=== 1944 general election ===
The 1944 election was one of the most lopsided in Saskatchewan history. The CCF won 47 seats in the Legislative Assembly, with the Liberals reduced to only five seats.

Saskatchewan general election: June 15, 1944
Party	Leaders	Seats Won	Popular Vote	Popular Vote Percentage
Co-operative Commonwealth Federation	Tommy Douglas^{1}	47	211,364	53.13%
Liberal	William John Patterson^{2}	5	140,901	35.42%
Progressive Conservative	Rupert Ramsay	0	42,511	10.69%
Labour Progressive	–	0	2,067	0.52%
Independent	–	0	705	0.18%
Social Credit	Joseph Needham	0	249	0.06%
Independent Liberal	–	0	5	0.00%^{3}
Total		52	397,802	100.0%
Source: Elections Saskatchewan — Elections Results — 1944

^{1} Member of the federal Parliament until shortly before the election was called; Premier after election.
^{2} Premier when election was called; Leader of the Opposition after election.
^{3} Rounds to zero.

=== 1948 general election ===
Douglas led the CCF in the 1948 election, and again won a majority, but with a much reduced seat count. The Liberals made significant comeback under a new leader, Walter Tucker, but remained the Official Opposition.

Saskatchewan general election: June 24, 1948
Party	Leaders	Seats Won	Popular Vote	Popular Vote Percentage
Co-operative Commonwealth Federation	Tommy Douglas^{1}	31	236,900	47.56%
Liberal	Walter Tucker^{2}	19	152,400	30.60%
Independent	–	1	11,088	2.23%
Conservative Liberal	–	1	5,251	1.05%
Social Credit	–	0	40,268	8.09%
Progressive Conservative	Rupert Ramsay	0	37,986	7.63%
Liberal-Progressive Conservative	–	0	9,574	1.92%
Independent Liberal	–	0	3,299	0.66%
Labour Progressive	–	0	1,301	0.26%
Total		52	498,067	100.00%
Source: Elections Saskatchewan — Elections Results — 1948

^{1} Premier when election was called; Premier after election.
^{2} Leader of the Opposition when election was called; Leader of the Opposition after election.

=== 1952 general election ===
In his third general election, Douglas again led the CCF to a majority government, with an increased seat count from the 1948 election. The Liberals remained the Official Opposition.

Saskatchewan general election: June 11, 1952
Party	Leaders	Seats Won	Popular Vote	Popular Vote Percentage
Co-operative Commonwealth Federation	Tommy Douglas^{1}	42	291,705	54.06%
Liberal	Walter Tucker^{2}	11	211,882	39.27%
Social Credit	–	0	21,045	3.90%
Progressive Conservative	Alvin Hamilton	0	10,648	1.97%
Independent Progressive Conservative	–	0	1,542	0.29%
Independent	–	0	1,517	0.28%
Labour Progressive	–	0	1,151	0.21%
Independent Liberal	–	0	103	0.02%
Total		53	539,593	100.00%
Source: Elections Saskatchewan — Elections Results — 1952

^{1} Premier when election was called; Premier after election.
^{2} Leader of the Opposition when election was called; Leader of the Opposition after election.

=== 1956 general election ===
In his fourth general election, Douglas again led the CCF to a majority government, with a reduced seat count from the 1952 election. The Liberals remained the Official Opposition, with a new leader, Alexander Hamilton McDonald.

Saskatchewan general election: June 20, 1956
Party	Leaders	Seats Won	Popular Vote	Popular Vote Percentage
Co-operative Commonwealth Federation	Tommy Douglas^{1}	36	249,634	45.25%
Liberal	Alexander Hamilton McDonald^{2}	14	167,427	30.34%
Social Credit	–	3	118,491	21.48%
Progressive Conservative	Alvin Hamilton	0	10,921	1.98%
Independent	–	0	4,714	0.85%
Labour Progressive	–	0	536	0.10%
Total		53	551,723	100.00%
Source: Elections Saskatchewan — Elections Results — 1956

^{1} Premier when election was called; Premier after election.
^{2} Leader of the Opposition when election was called; Leader of the Opposition after election.

=== 1960 general election ===
In his fifth and last general election, Douglas again led the CCF to a majority government. The Liberals remained the Official Opposition under a new leader, Ross Thatcher.

Saskatchewan general election: June 20, 1960
Party	Leaders	Seats Won	Popular Vote	Popular Vote Percentage
Co-operative Commonwealth Federation	Tommy Douglas^{1}	37	276,846	40.76%
Liberal	Ross Thatcher^{2}	17	221,932	32.67%
Progressive Conservative	Martin Pederson	0	94,737	13.95%
Social Credit	–	0	83,895	12.35%
Independent	–	0	1,417	0.21%
Communist	–	0	380	0.06%
Total		54	679,207	100.00%
Source: Elections Saskatchewan — Elections Results — 1960

^{1} Premier when election was called; Premier after election.
^{2} Leader of the Saskatchewan Liberal Party without seat in the Assembly when election called; Leader of the Opposition after election.

== Federal constituency elections ==
Douglas stood for election to the House of Common ten times, in two different provinces (Saskatchewan and British Columbia), and in five different ridings. He was elected eight times and defeated twice.

=== 1935 general election ===
Federal Election, 1935: Weyburn, Saskatchewan
Party	Candidate	Popular Vote	%
Co-operative Commonwealth Federation	E Tommy Douglas	7,280	45.0%
Liberal	X Edward James Young	6,979	43.14%
Communist	George Beischel	1,557	9.62%
Social Credit	Morton Allison Fletcher	362	2.24%
Total		16,178	100.00%
Source: Library of Parliament – Weyburn

E Elected.
X Incumbent.

=== 1940 general election ===
Federal Election, 1940: Weyburn, Saskatchewan
Party	Candidate	Popular Vote	%
Co-operative Commonwealth Federation	E X Tommy Douglas	8,509	52.10%
Liberal	Thomas Niddrie Metheral	7,554	46.25%
United Reform	John Harrison Hilton	269	1.65%
Total		16,332	100.00%
Source: Library of Parliament – Weyburn

E Elected.
X Incumbent.

=== 1962 general election ===
Federal Election, 1962: Regina City, Saskatchewan
Party	Candidate	Popular Vote	%
Progressive Conservative	E X Ken More	22,164	50.36%
New Democratic Party	Tommy Douglas	12,736	28.94%
Liberal	Frederick Johnson	7,529	17.11%
Social Credit	Arthur F. Boehme	1,583	3.60%
Total		44,012	100.01%^{1}
Source: Library of Parliament – Regina City

E Elected.
X Incumbent.
^{1} Rounding error.

=== 1962 by-election ===
Federal By-Election, October 22, 1962: Burnaby—Coquitlam, British Columbia
Party	Candidate	Popular Vote	%
New Democratic Party	E Tommy Douglas	16,313	50.43%
Liberal	Warren R. Clark	8,029	24.82%
Social Credit	René J. Gamache	5,282	16.33%
Progressive Conservative	Eric Greenwood	2,562	7.92%
Independent	George D. Burnham	162	0.50%
Total		32,348	100.00%
Source: Library of Parliament – Burnaby—Coquitlam

The by-election was triggered by the resignation of the incumbent NDP member, Erhart Regier, to allow Douglas, the party leader, to win a seat in the House of Commons.
E Elected.

=== 1963 general election ===
Federal Election, 1963: Burnaby—Coquitlam, British Columbia
Party	Candidate	Popular Vote	%
New Democratic Party	E X Tommy Douglas	19,067	46.37%
Liberal	Tom Kent	14,148	34.40%
Progressive Conservative	Lyn Morrow	3,990	9.70%
Social Credit	René J. Gamache	3,917	9.53%
Total		41,122	100.00%
Source: Library of Parliament – Burnaby—Coquitlam

E Elected.
X Incumbent.

=== 1965 general election ===
Federal Election, 1965: Burnaby—Coquitlam, British Columbia
Party	Candidate	Popular Vote	%
New Democratic Party	E X Tommy Douglas	22,553	52.92%
Liberal	Dick Hayes	12,090	28.37%
Social Credit	James Morris Kennedy	5,308	12.46%
Progressive Conservative	Mike Allen	2,662	6.25%
Total		42,613	100.00%
Source: Library of Parliament – Burnaby—Coquitlam

E Elected.
X Incumbent.

=== 1968 general election ===
Federal Election, 1968: Burnaby—Seymour, British Columbia
Party	Candidate	Popular Vote	%
Liberal	E Ray Perrault	17,891	45.23%
New Democratic Party	X Tommy Douglas	17,753	44.89%
Progressive Conservative	Charles MacLean	3,206	8.11%
Social Credit	Ron Price	702	1.77%
Total		39,552	100.00%
Source: Library of Parliament – Burnaby—Seymour

E Elected.
X Incumbent (before redistribution).

=== 1969 by-election ===
Federal By-election, February 10, 1969: Nanaimo—Cowichan—The Islands, British Columbia
Party	Candidate	Popular Vote	%
New Democratic Party	E Tommy Douglas	19,730	57.03%
Liberal	Eric W. Winch	12,897	37.28%
Progressive Conservative	Magdalenus Verbrugge	1,966	5.68%
Total		34,593	99.99%^{1}
Source: Library of Parliament – Nanaimo—Cowichan—The Islands

By-election was triggered by the death of the incumbent NDP member, Colin Cameron, on July 28, 1968.
E Elected.
^{1} Rounding error.

=== 1972 general election ===
Federal Election, 1972: Nanaimo—Cowichan—The Islands, British Columbia
Party	Candidate	Popular Vote	%
New Democratic Party	E X Tommy Douglas	25,483	56.93%
Progressive Conservative	George MacPherson	10,179	22.74%
Liberal	Bill Matthews	7,107	15.88%
Social Credit	Stockwell Day Sr.	1,868	4.17%
Independent	Ken Hasanen	125	0.28%
Total		44,762	100.00%
Source: Library of Parliament – Nanaimo—Cowichan—The Islands

E Elected.
X Incumbent.

== Federal general elections ==
In 1961, Douglas was elected the first leader of the federal New Democratic Party (NDP). He led the NDP in four federal general elections: 1962, 1963, 1965 and 1968. The NDP under his leadership was a smaller party in the House of Commons.

=== 1962 general election ===
In his first general election as leader of the NDP, Douglas more than doubled the seats won by the NDP, winning nineteen seats, compared to the eight seats won by the CCF in the 1958 election. Douglas was defeated in his own bid for a seat in Regina City, but won a by-election shortly afterwards in Burnaby—Coquitlam.

Canadian Federal Election, 1962
Party	Leaders	Seats Won	Popular Vote
Progressive Conservative	John Diefenbaker^{1}	116	37.2%
Liberal	Lester B. Pearson^{2}	99	37.0%
Social Credit	Robert N. Thompson	30	11.6%
New Democratic Party	Tommy Douglas	19	13.6%
Liberal–Labour	–	1	0.2%
Total		265	99.6%^{3}
Sources: Library of Parliament – 1962 General Election

^{1} Prime Minister when election was called; Prime Minister after election.
^{2} Leader of the Opposition when election was called; Leader of the Opposition after the election.
^{3} Table does not include parties which received votes but did not elect any members.

=== 1963 general election ===
Less than a year after the 1962 election, Diefenbaker's minority government fell on a motion of non-confidence, triggering the dissolution of Parliament and a general election. Douglas and the NDP held steady in their seat count.

Canadian Federal Election, 1963
Party	Leaders	Seats Won	Popular Vote
Liberal	Lester B. Pearson^{1}	128	41.5%
Progressive Conservative	John Diefenbaker^{2}	95	32.8%
Social Credit	Robert N. Thompson	24	11.9%
New Democratic Party	Tommy Douglas	17	13.2%
Liberal–Labour	–	1	0.2%
Total		265	99.6%^{3}
Sources: Library of Parliament – 1963 General Election

^{1} Leader of the Opposition when election was called; Prime Minister after election.
^{2} Prime Minister when election was called; Leader of the Opposition after the election.
^{3} Table does not include parties which received votes but did not elect any members.

=== 1965 general election ===
After two years of minority government, Pearson called an election. The result was another hung parliament. The NDP came third in the seat count.

Canadian Federal Election, 1965 — Parties, Leaders, Seats Won and Popular Vote
Party	Leaders	Seats Won	Popular Vote
Liberal	Lester B. Pearson^{1}	131	40.2%
Progressive Conservative	John Diefenbaker^{2}	97	32.4%
New Democratic Party	Tommy Douglas	21	17.9%
Ralliement créditiste	Réal Caouette	9	4.7%
Social Credit	Robert N. Thompson	5	3.7%
Independent	–	1	0.7%
Independent PC	–	1	0.2%
Total		265	99.8%^{3}
Sources: Library of Parliament – 1965 General Election

^{1} Prime Minister when election was called; Prime Minister after election.
^{2} Leader of the Opposition when election was called; Leader of the Opposition after the election.
^{3} Table does not include parties which received votes but did not elect any members.

=== 1968 general election ===
In his last general election as leader, the NDP held steady in seats, but Douglas was himself defeated in his own seat. He won a by-election shortly afterward in the riding of Nanaimo—Cowichan—The Islands and re-entered Parliament.

Canadian Federal Election, 1968 — Parties, Leaders, Seats Won and Popular Vote
Party	Leaders	Seats Won	Popular Vote
Liberal	Pierre Trudeau^{1}	154	45.4%
Progressive Conservative	Robert L. Stanfield^{2}	72	31.4%
New Democratic Party	Tommy Douglas	22	17.0%
Ralliement créditiste	Réal Caouette	14	4.4%
Independent	–	1	0.5%
Liberal-Labour	–	1	0.1%
Total		264	98.8%^{3}
Sources: Library of Parliament – 1968 General Election

^{1} Prime Minister when election was called; Prime Minister after election.
^{2} Leader of the Opposition when election was called; Leader of the Opposition after the election.
^{3} Table does not include parties which received votes but did not elect any members.

== Party leadership conventions ==
=== 1942 Saskatchewan CCF leadership convention ===
In 1942, Douglas challenged George Hara Williams, the leader of the Saskatchewan Section of the CCF for the provincial leadership. He defeated Williams and became provincial leader.

=== 1943 Saskatchewan CCF leadership challenge ===
In 1943, Douglas in turn was challenged for the leadership of the Saskatchewan CCF, by John Brockelbank. Douglas defeated the challenge.

=== 1961 Federal NDP leadership ===
In 1961, Douglas contested the leadership of the federal New Democratic Party, the successor to the CCF. He defeated Hazen Argue by a vote of 1,391 to 380, to become the first leader of the party.

Candidate	Votes	
Tommy Douglas	1,391	78.5%
Hazen Argue	380	12.5%
Total	43,652	100.0%
