= Moosomin-Montmartre =

Provincial electoral district in Saskatchewan, Canada

Coordinates: 50°18′N 102°25′W

Saskatchewan electoral district

Provincial electoral district
- Legislature: Legislative Assembly of Saskatchewan
MLA
Kevin Weedmark
Saskatchewan
- District created: 1905
- First contested: 1905
- Last contested: 2024

Demographics
- Electors: 10,345
- Census division(s): Division 5, 6
- Census subdivision: Moosomin

Moosomin-Montmartre is a provincial electoral district for the Legislative Assembly of Saskatchewan, Canada. Located in southeastern Saskatchewan, this constituency was one of 25 created for the 1st Saskatchewan general election in 1905 under the name Moosomin.

Formerly represented by speaker Don Toth, it is arguably one of the most conservative ridings in the province, having been in the hands of a centre-right party without interruption since 1975. It has never elected a member of the CCF or NDP, though the NDP came within 51 votes of winning it during its 1991 landslide.

The largest centre in the constituency is the town of Moosomin. Other towns in the district include Grenfell, Kipling, Montmartre, Broadview, Whitewood, Rocanville and Wolseley.

The riding was renamed Moosomin-Montmartre for the 2024 general election.

== Members of the Legislative Assembly ==
Legislature	Years	Member	Party
18th	1975–1978	Larry Birkbeck	Progressive Conservative
19th	1978–1982	Larry Birkbeck	Progressive Conservative
20th	1982–1986	Larry Birkbeck	Progressive Conservative
21st	1986–1991	Don Toth	Progressive Conservative
22nd	1991–1995	Don Toth	Progressive Conservative
23rd	1995–1997	Don Toth	Progressive Conservative
23rd	1997–1999	Don Toth	Saskatchewan Party
24th	1999–2003	Don Toth	Saskatchewan Party
25th	2003–2007	Don Toth	Saskatchewan Party
26th	2007–2011	Don Toth	Saskatchewan Party
27th	2011–2016	Don Toth	Saskatchewan Party
28th	2016–2020	Steven Bonk	Saskatchewan Party
29th	2020–2024	Steven Bonk	Saskatchewan Party
30th	2024–present	Kevin Weedmark	Saskatchewan Party

== Election results ==
2024 Saskatchewan general election
Party	Candidate	Votes	%	±%
Saskatchewan	Kevin Weedmark	5,291	66.10	-9.50
New Democratic	Chris Ball	1,911	23.87	+5.07
Saskatchewan United	Adam Erickson	609	7.61	–
Green	Remi Rheault	122	1.52	-0.68
Buffalo	Otis Ayre	72	0.90	–
Total valid votes		8,005	98.83	
Total rejected ballots		95	1.17	
Turnout		8,100	57.75	
Eligible voters		14,026		
Saskatchewan hold		Swing		
Source: Elections Saskatchewan

2020 provincial election redistributed results
Party	%
Saskatchewan	75.6
New Democratic	18.8
Green	2.2

2020 Saskatchewan general election: Moosomin
Party	Candidate	Votes	%	±%
Saskatchewan	Steven Bonk	5,467	77.78	+5.47
New Democratic	Ken Burton	1,143	16.26	+1.75
Progressive Conservative	Frank Serfas	248	3.53	-0.46
Green	Marjorie Graham	171	2.43	-1.00
Total valid votes		7,029	99.56	
Total rejected ballots		31	0.44	–
Turnout		7,060	–	–
Eligible voters		–		
Saskatchewan hold		Swing		–
Source: Elections Saskatchewan

2016 Saskatchewan general election: Moosomin
Party	Candidate	Votes	%	±%
Saskatchewan	Steven Bonk	5,142	72.31	-4.75
New Democratic	Ashlee Hicks	1,032	14.51	-5.42
Progressive Conservative	Lloyd Hauser	284	3.99	-
Green	Kate Ecklund	244	3.43	+0.42
Independent	Trevor Bearance	218	3.00	-
Liberal	Janice Palmer	191	2.68	-
Total valid votes		–	100.0	
Eligible voters		–		
Source: Elections Saskatchewan

2011 Saskatchewan general election: Moosomin electoral district
Party	Candidate	Votes	%	±%
Saskatchewan	Don Toth	4,810	77.06%	+4.74
NDP	Carol Morin	1,244	19.93%	-1.42
Green	Laura Forrester	188	3.01%	–
Total		6,242	100.00%	

2007 Saskatchewan general election: Moosomin electoral district
Party	Candidate	Votes	%	±%
Saskatchewan	Don Toth	5,101	72.32%	+12.46
NDP	Virginia Healey	1,506	21.35%	-9.49
Liberal	Randy Jeffries	446	6.33%	-0.56
Total		7,053	100.00%	

2003 Saskatchewan general election: Moosomin
Party	Candidate	Votes	%	±%
Saskatchewan	Don Toth	4,400	59.92%	+0.09
New Democratic	Robert Stringer	2,268	30.89%	+10.31
Liberal	Bryn Hirsch	506	6.89%	−12.81
Western Independence	Frank Serfas	169	2.30%	–
Total		7,343	100.00%	

1999 Saskatchewan general election: Moosomin electoral district
Party	Candidate	Votes	%	±%
Saskatchewan	Don Toth	4,669	59.77%	–
NDP	John M. McCormick	1,604	20.53%	-11.54
Liberal	John Van Eaton	1,539	19.70%	-6.42
Total		7,812	100.00%	

1995 Saskatchewan general election: Moosomin electoral district
Party	Candidate	Votes	%	±%
Progressive Conservative	Don Toth	3,314	41.81%	+1.39
NDP	Glen Gatin	2,542	32.07%	-7.67
Liberal	Vic Greenlaw	2,070	26.12%	+6.28
Total		7,926	100.00%	

1991 Saskatchewan general election: Moosomin electoral district
Party	Candidate	Votes	%	±%
Progressive Conservative	Don Toth	3,005	40.42%	-19.80
NDP	Mary McGuire	2,954	39.74%	+8.09
Liberal	Keith Lewis	1,475	19.84%	+11.71
Total		7,434	100.00%	

1986 Saskatchewan general election: Moosomin electoral district
Party	Candidate	Votes	%	±%
Progressive Conservative	Don Toth	4,622	60.22%	+9.44
NDP	William F. Sauter	2,429	31.65%	+1.46
Liberal	Myles Fuchs	624	8.13%	+5.08
Total		7,675	100.00%	

1982 Saskatchewan general election: Moosomin electoral district
Party	Candidate	Votes	%	±%
Progressive Conservative	Larry Birkbeck	4,165	50.78%	+8.50
NDP	Fred A. Easton	2,476	30.19%	-2.77
Western Canada Concept	Don Donaldson	1,311	15.98%	–
Liberal	Peter Semchuk	250	3.05%	-21.71
Total		8,202	100.00%	

1978 Saskatchewan general election: Moosomin electoral district
Party	Candidate	Votes	%	±%
Progressive Conservative	Larry Birkbeck	3,353	42.28%	+4.54
NDP	Fred A. Easton	2,614	32.96%	+6.86
Liberal	J. Sinclair Harrison	1,964	24.76%	-11.40
Total		7,931	100.00%	

1975 Saskatchewan general election: Moosomin electoral district
Party	Candidate	Votes	%	±%
Progressive Conservative	Larry Birkbeck	3,018	37.74%	-
Liberal	Ernest Gardner	2,891	36.16%	-15.64
NDP	Fred A. Easton	2,087	26.10%	-22.10
Total		7,996	100.00%	

1971 Saskatchewan general election: Moosomin electoral district
Party	Candidate	Votes	%	±%
Liberal	Ernest Gardner	4,003	51.80%	+8.91
NDP	Edward B. Shillington	3,724	48.20%	+16.53
Total		7,727	100.00%	

1967 Saskatchewan general election: Moosomin electoral district
Party	Candidate	Votes	%	±%
Liberal	Ernest Gardner	3,297	42.89%	+6.18
NDP	William F. Goodwin	2,435	31.67%	-2.48
Progressive Conservative	Andrew E. Bruce	1,956	25.44%	-3.70
Total		7,688	100.00%	

June 30, 1965 By-Election: Moosomin electoral district
Party	Candidate	Votes	%	±%
Liberal	Ernest Gardner	3,033	36.71%	-22.61
CCF	William F. Goodwin	2,821	34.15%	-6.53
Progressive Conservative	Andrew E. Bruce	2,407	29.14%	-
Total		8,261	100.00%	

1964 Saskatchewan general election: Moosomin electoral district
Party	Candidate	Votes	%	±%
Liberal	Alexander McDonald	4,523	59.32%	+19.17
CCF	William F. Goodwin	3,102	40.68%	+11.88
Total		7,625	100.00%	

1960 Saskatchewan general election: Moosomin electoral district
Party	Candidate	Votes	%	±%
Liberal	Alexander McDonald	3,245	40.15%	-4.30
CCF	Edwin Nystrom	2,328	28.80%	-1.72
Social Credit	Arthur E. Johnston	1,298	16.06%	-8.97
Progressive Conservative	Verlie McDonald	1,212	14.99%	-
Total		8,083	100.00%	

1956 Saskatchewan general election: Moosomin electoral district
Party	Candidate	Votes	%	±%
Liberal	Alexander McDonald	3,680	44.45%	-9.16
CCF	Alfred S. Swanson	2,527	30.52%	-15.87
Social Credit	William A. Thomas	2,072	25.03%	-
Total		8,279	100.00%	

1952 Saskatchewan general election: Moosomin electoral district
Party	Candidate	Votes	%	±%
Liberal	Alexander McDonald	4,639	53.61%	-6.80
CCF	Edwin Nystrom	4,014	46.39%	+6.80
Total		8,653	100.00%	

1948 Saskatchewan general election: Moosomin electoral district
Party	Candidate	Votes	%	±%
Conservative-Liberal	Alexander McDonald	5,251	60.41%	–
CCF	Ivan Burden	3,442	39.59%	-6.65
Total		8,693	100.00%	

1944 Saskatchewan general election: Moosomin electoral district
Party	Candidate	Votes	%	±%
Liberal	Arthur T. Procter	3,865	53.76%	+2.10
CCF	David A. Cunningham	3,324	46.24%	-
Total		7,189	100.00%	

1938 Saskatchewan general election: Moosomin electoral district
Party	Candidate	Votes	%	±%
Liberal	Arthur T. Procter	4,198	51.66%	+7.04
Conservative	Percy S. George	2,528	31.11%	-8.00
Social Credit	Joseph C. Richards	1,400	17.23%	–
Total		8,126	100.00%	

1934 Saskatchewan general election: Moosomin electoral district
Party	Candidate	Votes	%	±%
Liberal	Arthur T. Procter	2,812	44.62%	-
Conservative	Frederick Dennis Munroe	2,465	39.11%	-
Farmer-Labour	John Frederick Herman	1,025	16.27%	–
Total		6,302	100.00%	

October 7, 1929 By-Election: Moosomin electoral district
Party	Candidate	Votes	%	±%
Conservative	Frederick Dennis Munroe	Acclaimed	100.00%	
Total		Acclamation		

1929 Saskatchewan general election: Moosomin electoral district
Party	Candidate	Votes	%	±%
Conservative	Frederick Dennis Munroe	2,361	54.49%	-
Liberal	Arthur T. Procter	1,972	45.51%	-1.81
Total		4,333	100.00	

1925 Saskatchewan general election: Moosomin electoral district
Party	Candidate	Votes	%	±%
Independent	John Louis Salkeld	1,888	52.68%	+1.72
Liberal	George L. Martin	1,696	47.32%	-1.72
Total		3,584	100.00	

1921 Saskatchewan general election: Moosomin electoral district
Party	Candidate	Votes	%	±%
Conservative	John Louis Salkeld	1,892	50.96%	-2.06
Liberal	Daniel L. Oliver	1,821	49.04%	+2.06
Total		3,713	100.00	

1917 Saskatchewan general election: Moosomin electoral district
Party	Candidate	Votes	%	±%
Conservative	John Louis Salkeld	1,921	53.02%	+9.75
Liberal	Joseph Scott Goodman	1,702	46.98%	-9.75
Total		3,623	100.00	

1912 Saskatchewan general election: Moosomin electoral district
Party	Candidate	Votes	%	±%
Liberal	Alexander Smith Smith	1,146	56.73%	+5.15
Conservative	Edward Lindsey Elwood	874	43.27%	-5.15
Total		2,020	100.00	

1908 Saskatchewan general election: Moosomin electoral district
Party	Candidate	Votes	%	±%
Liberal	Alexander Smith Smith	1,026	51.58%	+2.58
Provincial Rights	Daniel David Ellis	963	48.42%	-2.58
Total		1,989	100.00	

1905 Saskatchewan general election: Moosomin electoral district
Party	Candidate	Votes	%	±%
Provincial Rights	Daniel David Ellis	915	51.00%	–
Liberal	Alexander Smith Smith	879	49.00%	–
Total		1,794	100.00	

== History ==
=== Members of the Legislative Assembly – Moosomin ===
#	MLA	Served	Party
1.	Daniel David Ellis	1905–1908	Provincial Rights
2.	Alexander Smith Smith	1908–1917	Liberal
3.	John Louis Salkeld	1917–1925	Conservative
4.	John Louis Salkeld	1925–1929	Independent
5.	Frederick Dennis Munroe	1929–1934	Conservative
6.	Arthur T. Procter	1934–1948	Liberal
7.	Alexander McDonald	1948–1965	Liberal
8.	Ernest Gardner	Sept. 1965 – 1975	Liberal
9.	Larry Birkbeck	1975–1986	Progressive Conservative
10.	Don Toth	1986–1997	Progressive Conservative
11.	Don Toth	1997–2016	Saskatchewan Party
12.	Steven Bonk	2016–present	Saskatchewan Party

== See also ==
- List of Saskatchewan provincial electoral districts
- List of Saskatchewan general elections
- Canadian provincial electoral districts
