= Don Toth =

Canadian politician (born 1948)

24th Speaker of the Legislative Assembly of Saskatchewan
- In office December 10, 2007 – October 10, 2011
- Preceded by: Myron Kowalsky
- Succeeded by: Dan D'Autremont

Member of the Legislative Assembly of Saskatchewan for Moosomin
- In office October 20, 1986 – April 4, 2016
- Preceded by: Larry Birkbeck
- Succeeded by: Steven Bonk

Personal details
- Born: May 31, 1948 (age 78) Kipling, Saskatchewan
- Party: Progressive Conservative (1980–1997); Saskatchewan Party (1997–present)
- Education: University of Saskatchewan; Eston College
- Occupation: Farmer

Donald James Toth (born May 31, 1948) is a Canadian retired provincial politician. He was Speaker of the Legislative Assembly of Saskatchewan during the first term of the Saskatchewan Party government of Premier Brad Wall, from 2007 to 2011. He represented the constituency of Moosomin in the Legislative Assembly of Saskatchewan from 1986 to 2016. While he was originally elected as a member of the Progressive Conservatives, he and some other Tories and Liberals co-founded the Saskatchewan Party in 1997. On December 10, 2007, he was elected Speaker by acclamation. Dan D'Autremont defeated him in the speakership election in the second term of the Wall government (2011–2016).

He was educated at the University of Saskatchewan and the Full Gospel Bible Institution in Eston (now Eston College).

Toth did not run for reelection in 2016. He was the last sitting legislator who had served during the Grant Devine government of the 1980s.
