= List of political parties in Saskatchewan =

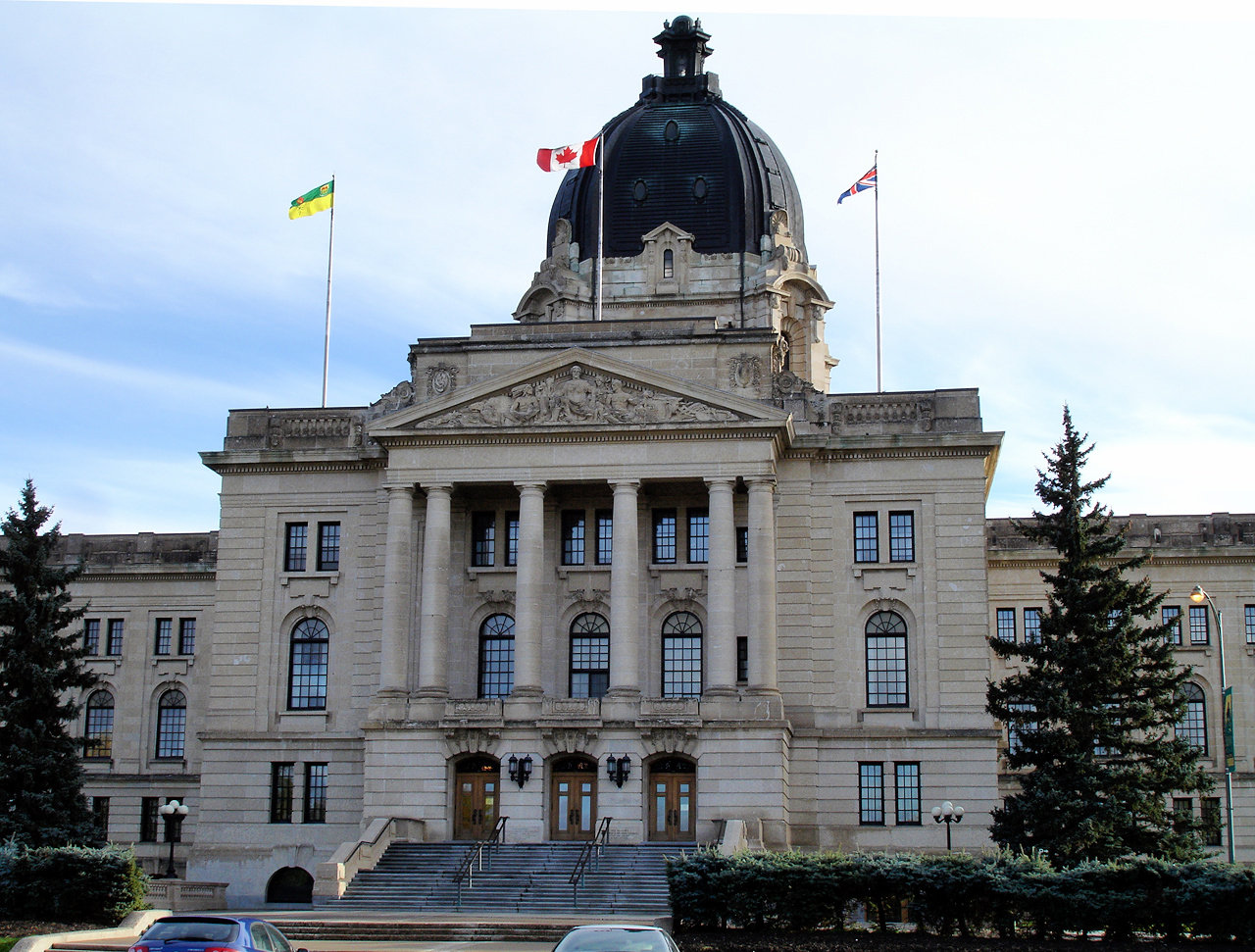
The Saskatchewan Legislative Building in Regina.

This is a list of political parties in Saskatchewan that have contested provincial general elections or have had representatives in the Legislative Assembly since the establishment of the province in 1905. In addition to the parties listed below, Saskatchewan elections have historically included candidates running as Independents, sometimes in coalitions or with affiliations to existing parties.

== Registered provincial parties ==
=== Parties represented in the Legislative Assembly ===
Name	Founded	Ideology	Leader	MLAs	Political position	Membership	Notes
New Democratic Party	1932	Social democracy	Carla Beck	27 / 61	Centre-left	7,294 (2022)	Successor to the Co-operative Commonwealth Federation (originally Farmer-Labour; became CCF-NDP in 1961 and NDP in 1967).
Saskatchewan Party	1997	Conservatism	Scott Moe	34 / 61	Centre-right to right-wing	27,125 (2017)	Founded by a coalition of Progressive Conservative and Liberal MLAs.

=== Other registered parties ===
Name	Founded	Ideology	Leader	Political position	Membership	Notes
Buffalo Party	2020	Conservatism	Phillip Zajac	Right-wing	>500 (2025)	Founded as Wexit Saskatchewan; promotes Western independence.
Green Party	1998	Green politics	Naomi Hunter	Centre-left		Founded as the New Green Alliance.
Progressive Conservative Party	1912	Conservatism	Rose Buscholl	Centre-right	80 (2018)	Founded as the Provincial Rights Party in 1905; the Conservative Party from 1912 to 1942.
Saskatchewan United Party	2022	Conservatism	Dwight Bunyan (interim)	Right-wing		Founded with former Saskatchewan Party MLA Nadine Wilson as leader.

== Historical provincial parties ==
Name	Founded	Ideology	Elections	Political position	Notes
Aboriginal People's Party	1982	Aboriginal rights	1982	Single-issue	
Communist Party	—	Communism	1938; 1944; 1948; 1952; 1956; 1960; 1964; 1971; 1986	Left-wing to far-left	Also ran candidates under the Unity and Labor-Progressive front banners, the latter when the Communist Party was banned in Canada.
Non-Partisan League	—	Social democracy	1917; 1921	Left-wing	Outgrowth of the Non-Partisan League of North Dakota; democratic socialist and agrarian.
Marijuana Party	2006	Anti-Prohibitionism	2007	Single-issue	
Progressive Party	1920	Agrarianism	1921; 1925; 1929	Left-wing	Joined a coalition government with the Conservatives in 1929.
Saskatchewan Liberal Party	1905	Liberalism	All provincial elections through 2024.	Centre to right-wing	Formed government ten times, most recently after the 1967 provincial election. Re-branded as the Saskatchewan Progress Party in 2023.
Social Credit Party	1935	Social credit	1938; 1944; 1948; 1952; 1956; 1960; 1964; 1967	Right-wing	Party promoting social credit monetary theory and reform.
Unionest Party	1980	Conservatism	—	Right-wing to far-right	Founded by former PC leader Dick Collver, who along with Dennis Ham, sat as Unionest MLAs until the party dissolved ahead of the 1982 election. The Unionests advocated for Western Canada to join the United States.
Western Canada Concept	1980	Conservatism	1982; 1986; 1991	Right-wing	Promoted Western independence.
Western Independence Party	2003	Libertarianism	2003; 2007; 2011; 2016	Right-wing	Promoted Western independence.

== See also ==
- Elections Saskatchewan
- Politics of Saskatchewan
