= List of Saskatchewan general elections =

This article provides a summary of results for the general elections to the Canadian province of Saskatchewan's unicameral legislative body, the Legislative Assembly of Saskatchewan. The number of seats has varied over time, from 25 for the first election in 1905 to a high of 66 for the 1991 election. There are currently 61 seats in the Legislature.

The charts on the right show the information graphically, with more recent elections on the right. They shows the popularity of the Liberal Party (red) before the Second World War and the subsequent rise of the Co-operative Commonwealth Federation, which was succeeded by the New Democratic Party (orange). The successes and failures of the Progressive Conservatives (blue) and the recent arrival of the Saskatchewan Party (green) as a new conservative party can also be seen.

== Results ==
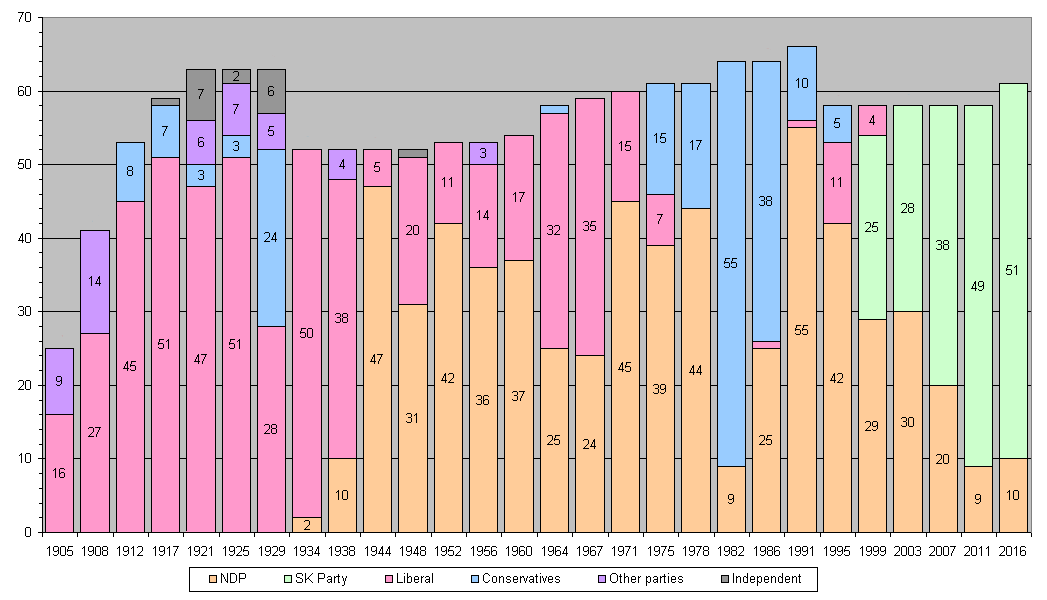
Number of seats won by major parties at each election: CCF / NDP / Liberal / Saskatchewan Party; Conservative / Other / Independent

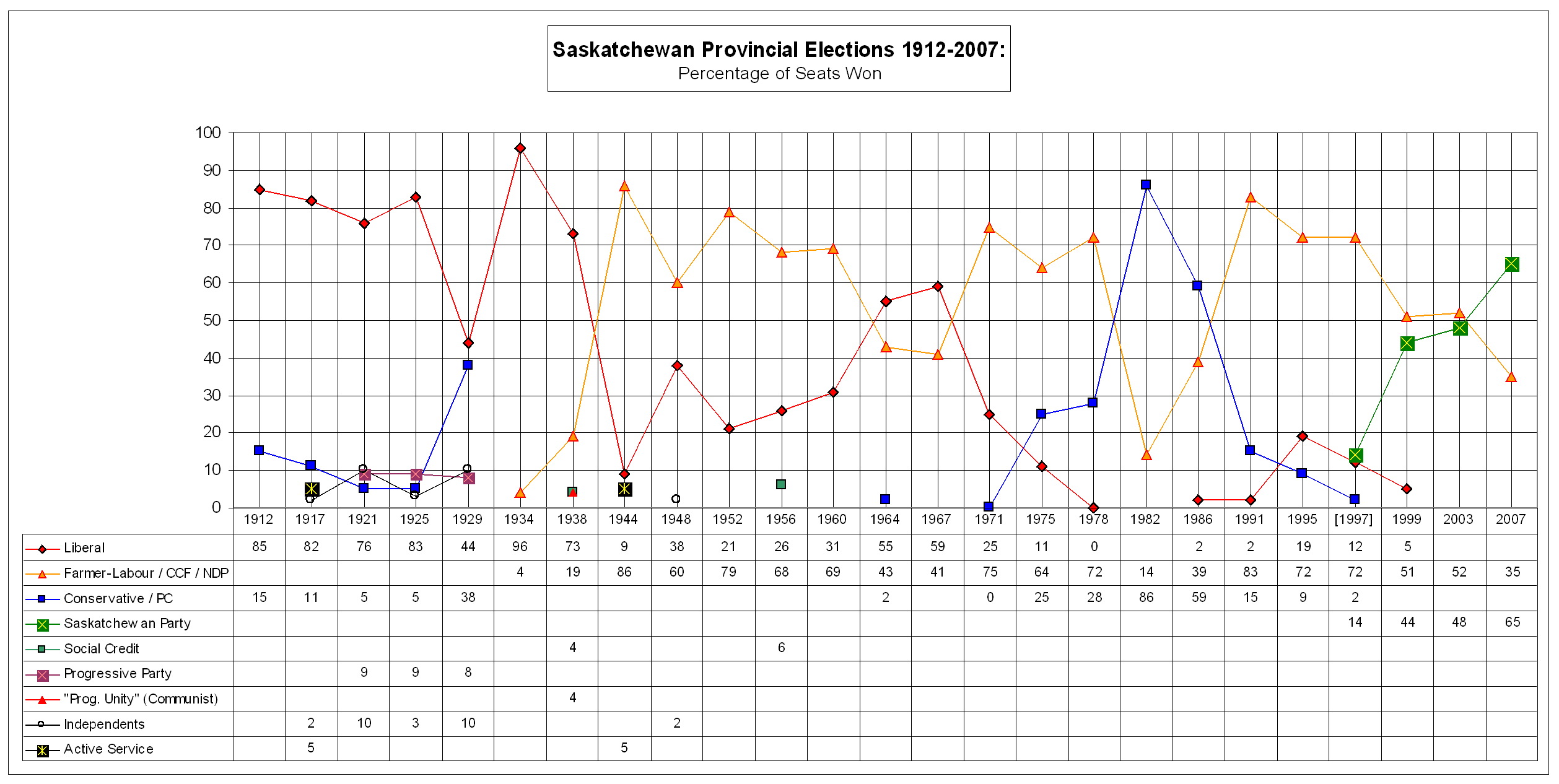
Electoral results by parties and independent MLAs (as a percentage of total Legislative Assembly seats) from 1912 to 2007. 1997 is shown due to the formation of the Saskatchewan Party.

The table below shows the total number of seats won by the major political parties at each election. The winning party's totals are shown in bold. Full details on any election are linked via the year of the election at the start of the row.

Year	Seats	Liberal^{[a]}		Progressive Conservative^{[b]}		CCF / NDP^{[c]}		Saskatchewan Party^{[d]}		Independent		Other parties	
Year	Seats	Seats	Vote (%)	Seats	Vote (%)	Seats	Vote (%)	Seats	Vote (%)	Seats	Vote (%)	Seats	Vote (%)
1905	25	**16**	**52.2**	9	47.5	—	—	—	—	0	0.3	—	—
1908	41	**27**	**50.8**	14	47.9	—	—	—	—	0	1.3	—	—
1912	53	**45**	**57.0**	8	42.0	—	—	—	—	0	1	—	—
1917	62	**51**	**52.8**	7	33.8	—	—	—	—	1	2.4	Soldier MLAs^{[e]} (3)	11.4
1921	63	**45**	**51.4**	2	3.9	—	—	—	—	9	31.8	Labour (1), Progressive (6)	12.9
1925	63	**50**	**51.5**	3	18.4	—	—	—	—	3	5.2	Progressive (6), Labour-Liberal (1)	24.9
1929	63	28	45.6	**24^{[f]}**	**36.4**	—	—	—	—	6	9.4	Progressive (5)	8.6
1934	55	**50**	**48.0**	0	26.8	5	24.0	—	—	0	0.7	0	0.6
1938	52	**38**	**45.5**	0	11.9	10	18.7	—	—	0	3.9	Unity (2), Social Credit (2)	20.1
1944	52	5	35.4	0	10.7	**47**	**53.1**	—	—	0	0.2	0	0.6
1948	52	20	33.6	0	7.6	**31**	**47.6**	—	—	1	2.9	0	8.4
1952	53	11	39.3	0	2.0	**42**	**54.1**	—	—	0	0.6	0	4.1
1956	53	14	30.3	0	2.0	**36**	**45.3**	—	—	0	0.9	Social Credit (3)	21.6
1960	54	17	32.7	0	14.0	**37**	**40.8**	—	—	0	0.2	0	12.4
1964	58	**32**	**40.4**	1	18.9	25	40.3	—	—	—	—	0	0.4
1967	59	**35**	**45.6**	0	9.8	24	44.4	—	—	—	—	0	0.3
1971	60	15	42.8	0	2.1	**45**	**55.0**	—	—	0	0.1	0	0.0
1975	61	15	31.7	7	27.6	**39**	**40.1**	—	—	0	0.6	—	—
1978	61	0	13.8	17	38.1	**44**	**48.1**	—	—	0	0.0	—	—
1982	64	0	4.5	**55**	**54.1**	9	37.6	—	—	0	0.3	0	3.5
1986	64	1	10.0	**38**	**44.6**	25	45.2	—	—	0	0.1	0	0.1
1991	66	1	23.3	10	25.5	**55**	**51.1**	—	—	0	0.1	0	0.0
1995	58	11	34.7	5	17.9	**42**	**47.2**	—	—	0	0.2	—	—
1999	58	4	20.2	0	0.4	**29**^{[g]}	**38.7**	25	39.6	0	0.1	0	1.0
2003	58	0	14.2	0	0.2	**30**	**44.7**	28	39.4	0	0.5	0	1.2
2007	58	0	9.4	0	0.2	20	37.2	**38**	**50.9**	—	—	0	2.3
2011	58	0	0.6	0	0.3	9	32.0	**49**	**64.3**	0	0.0	0	2.9
2016	61	0	3.6	0	1.3	10	30.3	**51**	**62.5**	0	0.4	0	1.9
2020	61	0	0.1	0	1.9	13	31.8	**48**	**61.1**	0	0.2	0	4.8
2024	61	0	0.2	0	1.0	27	40.4	**34**	**52.3**	0	0.1	0	6.4

=== Notes ===
^{a} Includes results as the Progress Party from 2023.
^{b} Includes results as the Provincial Rights Party from 1905 and 1908 and the Conservative Party from 1912 to 1944.
^{c} Includes results as the Farmer-Labour Group for 1934. The Co-operative Commonwealth Federation became the New Democratic Party; the party ran as the CCF-NDP in 1964 and as the NDP from 1967.
^{d} The Saskatchewan Party formed in 1997 with a merger of eight former Progressive Conservative and Liberal MLAs.
^{e} Three MLAs were elected to represent Saskatchewan residents serving overseas in Belgium, France, and England during the First World War.
^{f} The Liberals lost a confidence motion shortly after the election and government was formed by a Conservative coalition with Progressive and Independent members.
^{g} The NDP formed a coalition government with the Liberals.

== See also ==
- Politics of Saskatchewan
- List of political parties in Saskatchewan
