= 1948 Saskatchewan general election =

Canadian provincial election

← 1944	June 24, 1948	1952 →

52 seats in the Legislative Assembly of Saskatchewan 27 seats needed for a majority
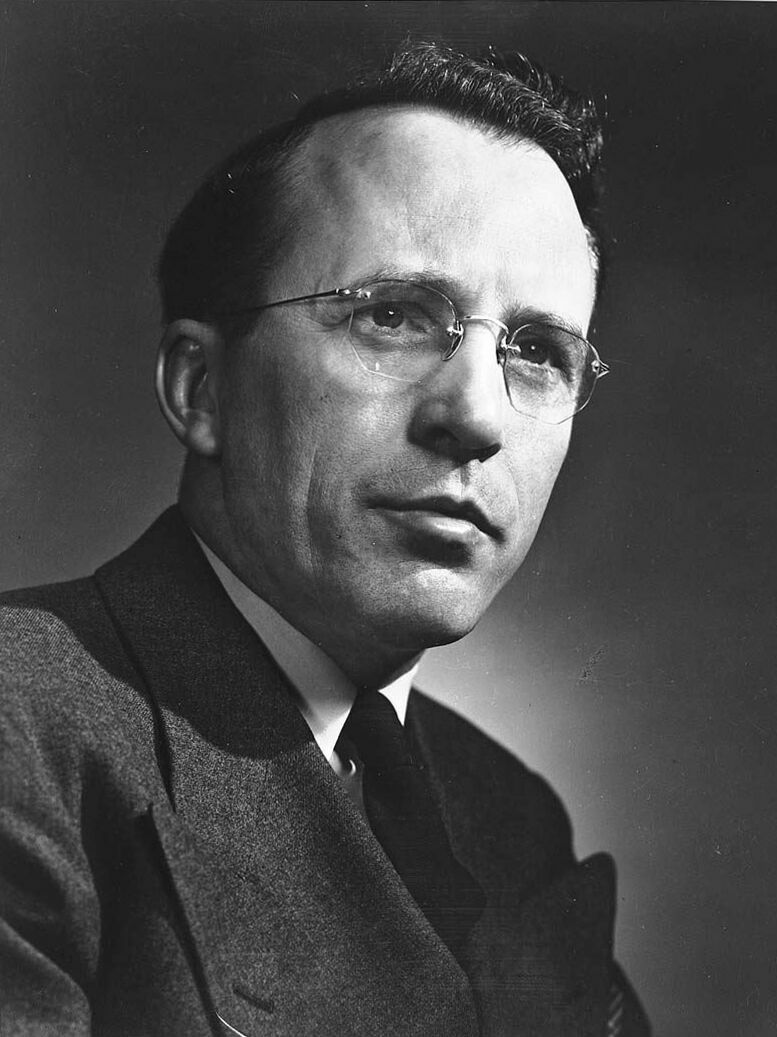

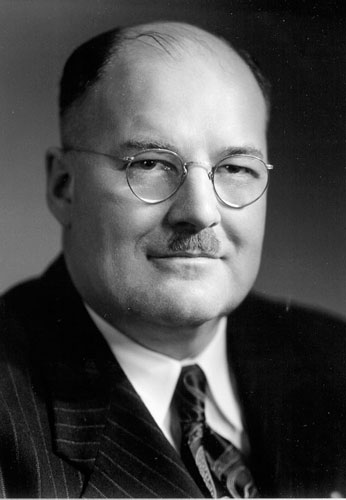

	First party	Second party
Leader	Tommy Douglas	Walter Tucker
Party	Co-operative Commonwealth	Liberal
Leader since	July 17, 1942	August 6, 1946
Leader's seat	Weyburn	Rosthern
Last election	47	5
Seats won	31	19
Seat change	▼16	▲14
Popular vote	236,900	152,400
Percentage	47.56%	30.60%
Swing	▼5.57pp	▼4.82pp
	Third party	Fourth party
Leader	Joshua Haldeman	Rupert Ramsay
Party	Social Credit	Progressive Conservative
Leader since	1946	February 15, 1944
Leader's seat	Ran in Yorkton (lost)	Ran in Saskatoon City (lost)
Last election	0	0
Seats won	0	0
Seat change	±0	±0
Popular vote	40,268	37,986
Percentage	8.09%	7.63%
Swing	▲8.03pp	▼3.06pp
Premier before election
Tommy Douglas
Co-operative Commonwealth
Premier after election
Tommy Douglas
Co-operative Commonwealth

The 1948 Saskatchewan general election, the eleventh in the history of the province, was held on June 24, 1948, to elect members of the Legislative Assembly of Saskatchewan. The Co-operative Commonwealth Federation government of Premier Tommy Douglas, first elected in 1944, was re-elected with a majority in the legislature.

== Summary ==
Tommy Douglas' Co-operative Commonwealth Federation (CCF) was re-elected with a reduced majority. While the CCF had won an outright majority of the popular vote in the 1944 election, the party won a large plurality in 1948, while seeing their seat share fall to 31 out of 51 in the Assembly.

Although the share of the popular vote won by Walter Tucker's Liberal Party fell by almost five percentage points, the party increased its representation in the legislature from 5 seats to 19.

The Social Credit Party, which had won 2 seats and 16% of the popular vote in the 1938 election—only to disappear in the 1944 election—returned to win over 8% of the vote, but no seats.

The Progressive Conservative Party, led by Rupert Ramsay, continued to decline, and was also shut out of the legislature.

In some ridings, the Progressive Conservatives and Liberals ran joint candidates in failed attempts to defeat the CCF. These candidates ran as Liberal-PC or Conservative Liberal candidates. The lone successful such candidate—Alex "Hammy" McDonald—immediately joined the Liberal caucus upon being sworn in as an MLA.

== Results ==
Party	Party Leader	# of candidates	Seats			Popular Vote		
Party	Party Leader	# of candidates	1944	Elected	% Change	#	%	% Change
Co-operative Commonwealth	Tommy Douglas	52	47	31	-34.0%	236,900	47.56%	-5.57%
Liberal	Walter Tucker	41	5	19	+280%	152,400	30.60%	-4.82%
Social Credit	Joshua Haldeman	36	–	–	–	40,268	8.09%	+8.03%
Independent		5	–	1	+1000%	11,088	2.23%	+2.05%
Conservative Liberal (Alexander H. McDonald)		1	*	1	*	5,251	1.05%	*
Progressive Conservative	Rupert Ramsay	9	–	–	–	37,986	7.63%	-3.06%
Liberal-PC		3	*	–	*	9,574	1.92%	*
Independent Liberal		1	*	–	*	3,299	0.66	*
Labor-Progressive		1	–	–	–	1,301	0.26%	-0.26%
Total		149	52	52	–	498,067	100%	
Source: Elections Saskatchewan

Note: * Party did not nominate candidates in previous election.

=== Percentages ===
Popular vote
CCF	47.56%
Liberal	30.60%
Social Credit	8.09%
PC	7.63%
Others	6.12%

Seats summary
CCF	59.62%
Liberal	36.54%
Others	3.85%

=== Ranking ===
Party	Seats	Second	Third	Fourth
Co-operative Commonwealth	31	20	1	0
Liberal	19	19	3	0
Independent/Other parties	2	6	3	0
Social Credit	0	2	31	3
Progressive Conservative	0	3	4	2

== Riding results ==
Names in bold represent cabinet ministers and the Speaker. Party leaders are italicized. The symbol " ** " indicates MLAs who are not running again.

=== Northwestern Saskatchewan ===
Electoral district	Candidates				Incumbent
Electoral district	CCF	Liberal	Social Credit	Other	Incumbent
Athabasca	Axel Olsen; 341			Louis M. Marion (Ind.) 628; Joseph D. Le Chasseur (Ind.) 225	Louis Marcien Marion
Cut Knife	Isidore Nollet; 3,027	William Bradley; 1,531	Fred F. Wilson; 1,642		Isidore Charles Nollet
Meadow Lake	Herschel Howell; 2,635	William Lofts; 3,307	John W. Evanishen; 1,081		Herschel Lee Howell
Redberry	Dmytro Lazorko; 2,357	Bernard Korchinski; 2,571		Robert C. Glen (PC) 643	Dmytro Matthew Lazorko
Rosthern	Wilbert S. Henschel; 959	Walter Tucker; 2,964	George W. Beilhartz; 1,736		Peter J. Hooge**
Shellbrook	Louis Larsen; 2,981	W.R. Vincent; 2,806	George J. Klein; 959		Guy Franklin Van Eaton**
The Battlefords	Alex Connon; 3,554	Paul Prince; 3,990			Alexander Duff Connon
Turtleford	Bob Wooff; 2,280	Leo Trippe; 2,462	Matthew Slager; 1,357		Robert Hanson Wooff

February 4, 1950 By-Election: The Battlefords
Party	Candidate	Votes	%	±%
Liberal	Hugh Maher	3,296	48.22%	-4.67
CCF	Alex Connon	3,158	46.20%	-0.91
Prog. Conservative	David J. Thiessen	381	5.58%	–
Total		6,835	100.00%	

=== Northeastern Saskatchewan ===
Electoral district	Candidates				Incumbent
Electoral district	CCF	Liberal	Social Credit	Other	Incumbent
Cumberland	Joseph Johnson; 425	Lorne Blanchard; 656		Joseph Maxim Buote (Ind.) 40	Les Walter Lee**
Humboldt	Ben Putnam; 2,657	Arnold Loehr; 2,689	Joseph A. Thauberger; 2,515		Ben Putnam
Kelvington	Peter Howe; 2,991	Gladstone Mansfield Ferrie; 2,639	Frederick A. Patrick; 1,225		Peter Anton Howe
Kinistino	William J. Boyle; 2,991	William C. Woods; 3,086			William James Boyle
Melfort	Oakland Valleau; 4,035	John Egnatoff; 4,065			Oakland Woods Valleau
Prince Albert	Larry McIntosh; 6,944	Charles McIntosh; 6,052	Ralph Ernst; 579		Lachlan Fraser McIntosh
Tisdale	John Hewgill Brockelbank; 5,242	Donald L.W. Hood; 3,980		William Lucas Hayes (PC) 1,171	John Hewgill Brockelbank
Torch River	John Denike; 2,260	Harold Guloien; 1,779	Leo Nile Nicholson; 1,448		John Bruce Harris**

=== West Central Saskatchewan ===
Electoral district	Candidates				Incumbent
Electoral district	CCF	Liberal	Social Credit	Other	Incumbent
Arm River	E.L. Heinrich; 2,263	Gustaf Herman Danielson; 3,400	Gabriel J. Giesinger; 689		Gustaf Herman Danielson
Biggar	Woodrow Lloyd; 3,695	Andrew S. Shaw; 2,987			Woodrow Stanley Lloyd
Hanley	Robert A. Walker; 2,417	Clayton L. Pascoe; 2,366	Frederick E. Roluf; 512	Emmett M. Hall (PC) 1,025	James Smith Aitken**
Kerrobert-Kindersley	John Wellbelove; 3,333	Fred Larson; 3,155	Norman Wildman; 1,063		John Wellbelove
Rosetown	John T. Douglas; 3,647			Alvin Hamilton (PC) 3,218	John Taylor Douglas
Watrous	James A. Darling; 2,968	Andrew William Michayluk; 2,829	Martin Kelln; 1,092		James Andrew Darling
Wilkie	Hans O. Hansen; 2,566	John W. Horsman; 3,143	George K. Nicholson; 1,110	O. Allen Bently (PC) 329	Hans Ove Hansen

=== East Central Saskatchewan ===
Electoral district	Candidates				Incumbent
Electoral district	CCF	Liberal	Social Credit	Other	Incumbent
Canora	Alex Kuziak; 3,104	Stephen T. Shabbits; 2,453	Stanley W. Gorchynski; 1,801		Myron Henry Feeley**
Last Mountain	Jacob Benson; 3,755	James Wilfrid Gardiner; 3,001	Godfrey Kelln; 1,219		Jacob Benson
Melville	George T. Webster; 4,690	Patrick Deshaye; 5,302	John W. Hauser; 1,014		Bill Arthurs**
Pelly	Dan Daniels; 2,476	John G. Banks; 2,646	John W. Kowalyshen; 1,020	William M. Berezowski (Labour Prog.) 1,301	Daniel Zederayko Daniels
Saltcoats	Joseph L. Phelps; 3,620	Asmundur Loptson; 3,945	George A. Dulmage; 807		Joseph Lee Phelps
Touchwood	**Tom Johnston**; 2,627	John Joseph Collins; 2,459	Harold Fletcher; 1,097		Tom Johnston
Wadena	Frederick Dewhurst; 4,218	Halldor K. Halldorson; 2,930	Denis Dunlop; 729		Frederick Arthur Dewhurst
Yorkton	Arthur Swallow; 3,795	Andrew M. Kindred; 3,256	Joshua N. Haldeman; 1,792		Arthur Percy Swallow

=== Southwest Saskatchewan ===
Electoral district	Candidates				Incumbent
Electoral district	CCF	Liberal	Social Credit	Other	Incumbent
Elrose	Maurice J. Willis; 4,153			Harry N. McKenzie (Ind. Liberal) 3,299	Maurice John Willis
Gravelbourg	Henry Houze; 2,525	Edward Culliton; 2,935	Milton A. Wilson; 404		Henry Edmund Houze
Gull Lake	Alvin C. Murray; 4,251		William E. Cowie; 936	Jonas A. Johnson (Liberal-PC) 2,983	Alvin Cecil Murray
Maple Creek	Beatrice J. Trew; 2,590	Alexander C. Cameron; 2,920	A.J. Miller; 2,491		Beatrice Janet Trew
Morse	James W. Gibson; 3,069	Ronald D. Miller; 2,465	Fred Erhardt; 694	John K. Rosa (PC) 481	James William Gibson
Notukeu-Willow Bunch	Niles Leonard Buchanan; 4,048	Hans Loken; 3,483			Niles Leonard Buchanan
Swift Current	Harry Gibbs; 5,273	Clarence J. Orton; 5,091			Harry Gibbs

November 10, 1949 By-Election: Gull Lake
Party	Candidate	Votes	%	±%
CCF	Thomas Bentley	3,627	51.36%	-0.67
Liberal	Harold M. Haney	2,792	39.54%	–
Prog. Conservative	Charles H. Howlett	643	9.10%	–
Total		7,062	100.00%	

July 10, 1951 By-Election: Gravelbourg
Party	Candidate	Votes	%	±%
CCF	Edward H. Walker	2,571	50.76%	+7.70
Liberal	Ronald A. MacLean	2,494	49.24%	-0.81
Total		5,065	100.00%	

=== Southeast Saskatchewan ===
Electoral district	Candidates				Incumbent
Electoral district	CCF	Liberal	Social Credit	Other	Incumbent
Bengough	Allan L.S. Brown; 3,599	Archie V. Wightman; 2,627	Arnold L. Meginbir; 705		Allan L. Samuel Brown
Cannington	Ralph Hjertaas; 3,422	William Patterson; 4,687	Peter Franchuk; 500		William John Patterson
Lumsden	William S. Thair; 2,876	Henry P. Mang; 2,220	Gustav D. Pelzer; 744	Arthur M. Pearson (PC) 1,003	William Sancho Thair
Milestone	Jacob Erb; 2,803		George M. Howell; 1,020	Lionel Aston (Liberal-PC) 2,363	Frank Keem Malcolm**
Moosomin	Ivan Burden; 3,442			Alex "Hammy" McDonald (Conservative-Liberal) 5,251	Arthur Thomas Procter**
Qu'Appelle-Wolseley	Warden Burgess; 3,903	Frederick M. Dundas; 4,470	Evert F. Josephson; 1,253		Warden Burgess
Souris-Estevan	Charles Cuming; 4,741	John E. McCormack; 4,924	John K. Strachan; 417		Charles David Cuming
Weyburn	**Tommy Douglas**; 6,273		Isabel Paxman; 638	F. Charles Eaglesham (Liberal-PC) 4,228	Tommy Douglas

November 10, 1949 By-Election: Cannington
Party	Candidate	Votes	%	±%
Liberal	Rosscoe A. McCarthy	4,200	54.06%	-0.38
CCF	Edward G. McCullough	3,569	45.94%	+6.19
Total		7,769	100.00%	

=== Urban constituencies ===
Electoral district	Candidates				Incumbent
Electoral district	CCF	Liberal	Social Credit	Other	Incumbent
Moose Jaw City	John Wesley Corman; 7,534 D. Henry R. Heming; 7,331			H. Gordon Young (Ind.) 5,240 J. Fraser McClellan (Ind.) 4,955	John Wesley Corman Dempster Henry R. Heming
Saskatoon City	John Henry Sturdy; 14,970 Arthur T. Stone; 14,295	L. Charles Sherman; 11,551	Malcolm J. Haver; 1,959	Rupert D. Ramsay (PC) 13,376	John Henry Sturdy Arthur T. Stone
Regina City	Charlie Williams; 20,475 Clarence Fines; 20,474	Wilfred G. Brown; 16,578	Walter E. Stowe; 1,049 Anthony E. Kovatch; 971	Allan W. Embury (PC) 16,740	Charles Cromwell Williams Clarence Melvin Fines

== See also ==
- List of Saskatchewan general elections
- List of Saskatchewan provincial electoral districts
- List of political parties in Saskatchewan
