= Ernest Franklin Gardner =

Canadian politician

Ernest Franklin "John" Gardner (January 5, 1923 – May 13, 1995) was a farmer, educator and political figure in Saskatchewan. He represented Moosomin from 1965 to 1975 in the Legislative Assembly of Saskatchewan as a Liberal.

He was born in Kennedy, Saskatchewan and was educated there and went on to study mechanical engineering at the University of Saskatchewan. During World War II, Gardner served as a pilot and navigator in the Royal Canadian Air Force. After the war, he worked as a selection officer in the Canadian civil service. Later, he farmed during the summer and taught at the University of Saskatchewan during the winter. Gardner also served on the council for the rural municipality of Wawken and as mayor of Kennedy. He was a member of the Kipling Hospital Board and the Cannington Home Care Board. Gardner served in the provincial cabinet as Minister of Public Works. He was first elected to the Saskatchewan assembly in a 1965 by-election held after Alexander Hamilton McDonald was named to the Senate of Canada. He was defeated by Larry Birkbeck when he ran for reelection to the assembly in 1975. After leaving politics, Gardner served as a member of the senate for the University of Saskatchewan. From 1988 to 1994, he was chairman for the Regina Rural Health Region.
