= Communist Party of Canada (Saskatchewan) =

- Former provincial party
- Ideology: Communism; Marxism–Leninism
- National affiliation: Communist Party of Canada

The Communist Party of Canada (Saskatchewan) was a communist party in the Canadian province of Saskatchewan. It was the Saskatchewan section of the Communist Party of Canada.

The party nominated candidates for the Legislative Assembly of Saskatchewan in provincial elections between 1938 and 1986. It ran three popular front candidates under the name "Unity" in 1938, electing two MLAs. It also ran two candidates under the Communist label, who failed to get elected. After the Communist Party was banned in the early years of World War II, it established the Labor-Progressive Party as its legal front, and ran candidates under that name throughout the 1940s and 1950s. It reverted to the Communist Party label in 1960. In 1982, it was removed from the Register of Political Parties after failing to nominate ten candidates to the general election.

== Electoral history ==
| Election | # of votes | % of popular vote | # of candidates | # elected |
Unity / Communist
| 1938 | 18,362 (Note: 9,848 Unity / 8,514 Communist) | 4.17 (Note: 2.24 Unity / 1.93 Communist) | 5 (Note: 3 Unity / 2 Communist) | 2 (Note: 2 Unity / 0 Communist) |
Labor-Progressive Party
| 1944 | 2,067 | 0.52 | 3 | 0 |
| 1948 | 1,301 | 0.26 | 1 | 0 |
| 1952 | 1,151 | 0.21 | 2 | 0 |
| 1956 | 536 | 0.1 | 2 | 0 |
Communist Party
| 1960 | 380 | 0.06 | 2 | 0 |
| 1964 | 68 | 0.01 | 1 | 0 |
| 1971 | 46 | 0.01 | 1 | 0 |
| 1986 | 73 | 0.01 | 1 | 0 |

== See also ==
- List of Canadian political parties
- Politics of Saskatchewan
