= Alexander Hamilton McDonald =

Canadian politician

Canadian Senator from Saskatchewan
- In office 1965–1980

Leader of the Opposition in Saskatchewan
- In office 1955–1960
- Preceded by: Asmundur Loptson
- Succeeded by: Ross Thatcher

Member of the Legislative Assembly of Saskatchewan for Moosomin
- In office 1952–1965
- Preceded by: Arthur Thomas Procter
- Succeeded by: Frank Gardner

Personal details
- Born: March 16, 1919 Fleming, Saskatchewan, Canada
- Died: March 31, 1980 (aged 61) Ottawa, Ontario, Canada
- Party: Saskatchewan Liberal Party
- Other political affiliations: Liberal Party of Canada
- Spouse: Madeleine Anne Casey

Alexander Hamilton (Hammy) McDonald (March 16, 1919 – March 31, 1980) was a Canadian politician from the province of Saskatchewan.

== Early life ==
Born in Fleming, Saskatchewan, he was the son of a Saskatchewan farm family and was the third generation of his family to farm in the Fleming area.

== Military service ==
During World War II, McDonald served overseas as a Flight Lieutenant in the Royal Canadian Air Force. He had learned to fly before the war. A doctor in the Fleming community in which he grew up had a plane and taught him and several other boys how to fly. By virtue of this fact, He was one of the very earliest pilots in the RCAF. Until 1944 he flew a Spitfire with real distinction. He was shot down several times, more than once in Europe, and made his way back through enemy territory to fly again.

Once, he was shot down in the English Channel and spent several hours in his Mae West. By sheer luck he was picked up by an English fishing boat and was flying again in Europe a week later. He came back from the war having won several medals including the Distinguished Flying Cross.

== Political career ==
Upon returning from the Second World War with his wife, the former Madeleine Anne Casey of Washington, D.C., McDonald went back to the 960-acre (3.9 km^{2}) Fleming farm originally settled by his grandfather in 1881. He didn't seek his first nomination; rather, he was pressed by families and neighbours to let his name stand. He ran as a "Liberal-Progressive Conservative" candidate in the provincial general election of 1948, having been nominated by a joint constituency convention of the two parties.

Soon after he took a seat in the Legislative Assembly of Saskatchewan, he devoted his political career solely to the Liberal Party and ran successfully as a Liberal candidate for the constituency of Moosomin in the 1952, 1956, 1960 and 1964 general elections. During his career in provincial politics, he rose rapidly in prominence in public life and within the Liberal Party, becoming the leader of the provincial party in 1954, a position which he held for five years. An article describing his career in this context noted, "The swift and dazzling rise of 37-year-old Alexander Hamilton McDonald to the leadership of the Liberal Party in Saskatchewan has no parallel in Canadian political history." From 1955 to 1960, he was the Leader of the Opposition and continued to hold responsible positions within the Liberal Party after his tenure as party leader. From 1964 to 1965, he served as Minister of Agriculture and Deputy Premier to Premier Ross Thatcher.

He resigned his seat in 1965 and later that year was appointed to the Senate of Canada representing the senatorial division of Moosomin, Saskatchewan. A Liberal, he was Deputy Leader of the Government in the Senate (appointed in 1968) and Government Whip in the Senate (appointed in 1970). Throughout his parliamentary career, McDonald was active in the affairs of the Commonwealth Parliamentary Association, the International Parliamentary Union and the NATO Parliamentary Assembly. He took part in community activities as a member of the Royal Canadian Legion, the United Services Institute and the Elks Lodge.

== Death ==
McDonald died in office in 1980. His funeral – held at the United Church in Moosomin, Saskatchewan – was overflowing with dignitaries from Ottawa, the provinces and many, many locals from within the constituency. He was remembered with real affection and was genuinely liked by both sides of the Saskatchewan Legislative Assembly. His honorary pallbearers included two Members elected under the NDP banner.
