= 31st Saskatchewan general election =

Canadian provincial election

- On or before October 30, 2028

61 seats in the Legislative Assembly of Saskatchewan 31 seats needed for a majority
- Opinion polls
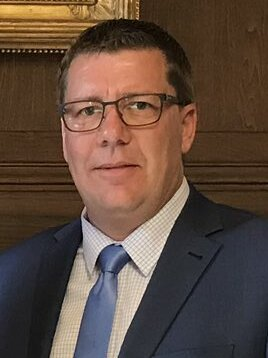

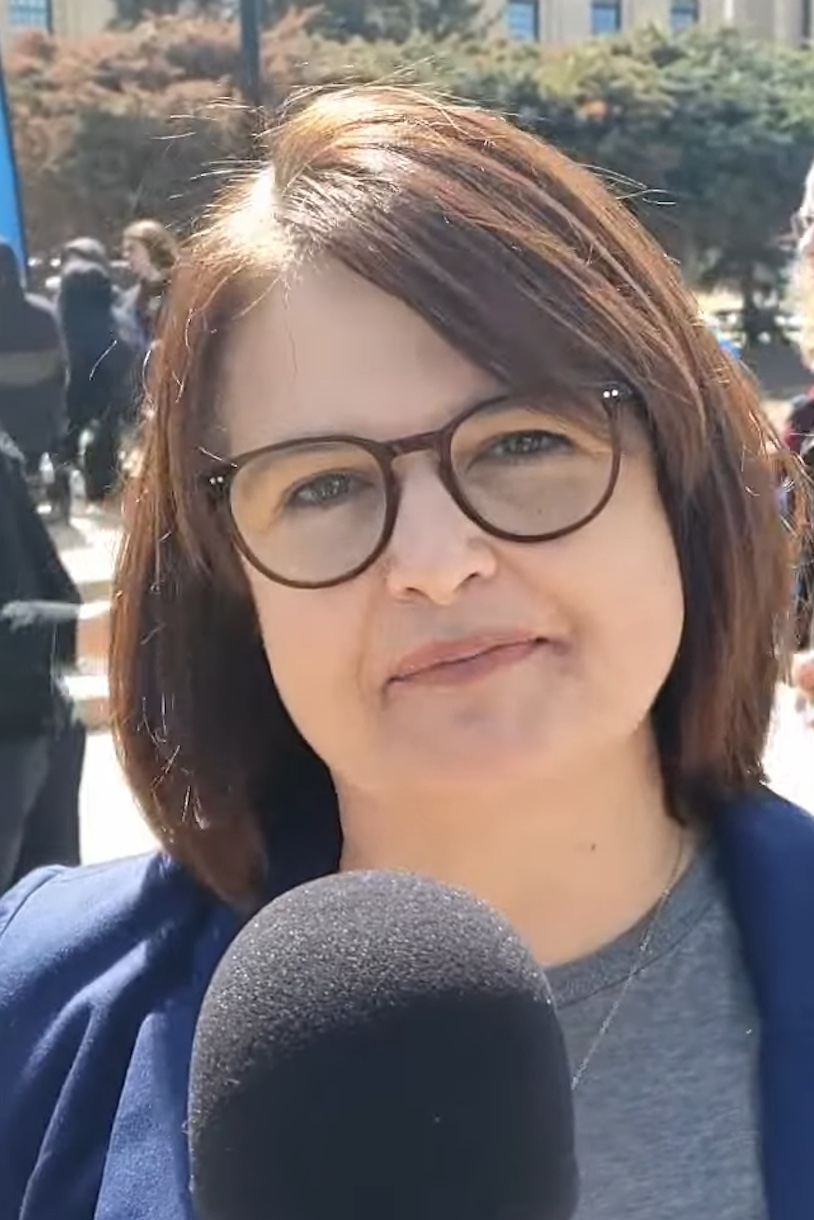
Leader	Scott Moe	Carla Beck
Party	Saskatchewan	New Democratic
Leader since	January 27, 2018	June 26, 2022
Leader's seat	Rosthern-Shellbrook	Regina Lakeview
Last election	34 seats, 52.3%	27 seats, 40.4%
Incumbent Premier
Scott Moe
Saskatchewan

The 31st Saskatchewan general election will elect members of the Legislative Assembly to serve in the 31st Saskatchewan Legislature. The Election Act requires that the election be held on October 30, 2028 but it may be called earlier.. The incumbent Saskatchewan Party government, led by Premier Scott Moe since 2018, will be seeking re-election to a sixth consecutive term.

== Background ==
Since 2007, the Saskatchewan Party has been the province's governing party.

Since 2010, the Legislative Assembly has had a fixed four-year term. According to the 2019 amendment to the Legislative Assembly Act, 2007, "the first general election after the coming into force of this subsection must be held on Monday, October 26, 2020." Subsequent elections, must occur "on the last Monday of October in the fourth calendar year after the last general election." However, the act also provides that if the election period would overlap with a federal election period, the provincial election is to be postponed until the first Monday of the following April; in this case: April 7, 2025. The fixed election law does not infringe on the Lieutenant Governor's right to dissolve the Legislative Assembly at an earlier date on the Premier's advice.

== Opinion polls ==
Opinion polls
Polling firm	Client	Dates conducted	Source	SK Party	NDP	United	Green	PC	Buffalo	Others	Margin of error	Sample size	Polling method	Lead
Angus Reid Institute	N/A	Oct 22–26, 2026		51%	40%	—	1%	—	—	8%	±4%	505	Online	11%
Abacus Data	N/A	Oct 5–13, 2026		48%	46%	—	—	—	—	6%	±3.1%	1,000	Online	2%
Insightrix	Saskatchewan NDP	Apr 2026		45%	45%	3%	2%	—	1%	4%	N/A	612	Online	Tie
Angus Reid Institute	N/A	Nov 26 – Dec 1, 2025		55%	39%	—	2%	—	—	5%	±5%	326	Online	16%
Angus Reid Institute	N/A	Aug 28 – Sep 5, 2025		54%	41%	—	1%	—	—	6%	±5%	296	Online	13%
Canadian Election Study	N/A	Apr 29 – May 13, 2025		46%	29%	—	2%	14%	2%	8%	N/A	314	Online	17%
2024 general election		Oct 28, 2024		52.3%	40.4%	3.9%	1.8%	1.0%	0.7%	0.3%	—N/a	—N/a	—N/a	11.9%
