= Frederick Dennis Munroe =

Canadian politician

Frederick Dennis Munroe (November 13, 1881 – November 21, 1955) was a physician and political figure in Saskatchewan. He represented Moosomin from 1929 to 1934 in the Legislative Assembly of Saskatchewan as a Conservative.

He was born in Moose Creek, Ontario, the son of David D. Munroe and Mary McRae, and was educated in Moose Creek, in Cornwall and at McGill University where he received his M.D. in 1906. Munroe moved to Welwyn, Saskatchewan in 1908 and practised medicine there for 22 years. He also served as chairman of the Welwyn School Board. In 1909, he married Frances Gardiner Jamieson. Munroe served in the provincial cabinet as Minister of Public Health. He was also chairman of the Saskatchewan Cancer Commission. Munroe helped establish a psychopathic ward, named the Munroe Wing in 1949, in the Regina General Hospital. He was defeated by Arthur T. Procter when he ran for reelection to the provincial assembly in 1934. After leaving politics, he practised medicine in Regina until 1954. He died in Regina at the age of 74.

The Canadian Cancer Society established the annual Munroe Lectures, named in his honour, in 1954.
