= Alexander S. Smith =

Canadian politician (1868–1916)

Alexander Smith Smith (August 24, 1868 – November 10, 1916) was a hardware merchant and political figure in Saskatchewan. He represented Moosomin from 1898 to 1905 in the Legislative Assembly of the Northwest Territories and then Moosomin in the Legislative Assembly of Saskatchewan from 1908 to 1916 as a Liberal.

He was born at sea off the Grand Banks of Newfoundland, the son of A.S. Smith, a native of Scotland, and was educated in St. Marys, Ontario. Smith came to Moosomin, Saskatchewan, establishing a tinsmithing and hardware business. He served on the town council and was the town's second mayor. In 1892, Smith married Kate R. Ross. He was defeated by Daniel David Ellis when he ran for election to the Saskatchewan assembly in 1905. Poor health later forced Smith to retire to Arizona for the winters.
