= Rupert Ramsay =

Professor and former leader of the Progressive Conservative Party of Saskatchewan

Leader of the Progressive Conservative Party of Saskatchewan
- In office February 15, 1944 – October 12, 1949
- Preceded by: H.E. Keown
- Succeeded by: Alvin Hamilton

Personal details
- Born: 1899, Toronto
- Died: 24 August 1962
- Education: University of Saskatchewan; University of Minnesota
- Profession: Professor

Rupert David Ramsay (1899 – 24 August 1962), born in Toronto, was a Canadian politician who served as the leader of the Progressive Conservative Party of Saskatchewan from 1944 to 1949.

Ramsay grew up in an agricultural environment and pursued agriculture professionally, serving in various positions before becoming a professor and department head at the University of Saskatchewan.

He led the Progressive Conservative Party in two elections: the 1944 Saskatchewan general election and the 1948 Saskatchewan general election. The party never achieved a single legislative position and performed poorly in both elections.

After officially resigning from the leadership position in 1949, following releasing an announcement in 1948, Ramsay continued to work at the University of Saskatchewan until his death in 1962.

== Early life and education ==
Ramsay was born in 1899 in Toronto, Ontario, and moved in 1905 to Bladworth, Saskatchewan with his father, who specialized in raising Clydesdale horses and farming seed grains.

Ramsay graduated from the University of Saskatchewan with a Bachelor's of Science and Arts degree in 1929. In 1932, he graduated from the University of Minnesota with a Master's of Science degree, specializing in animal nutrition.

== Before politics ==
Alongside working for the Industrial and Development Council of Canadian Meat Packers for a year, Ramsay additionally worked with the University of Saskatchewan's Agricultural Extension Department as a livestock specialist throughout the 1930s and early 1940s.

== Politics ==
=== Context ===
The Conservative Party of Saskatchewan faced a general decline in popularity during the 1930s due to the Great Recession, which started shortly after Conservative Premier J.T.M. Anderson took office. To be competitive against the new democratic socialist Co-operative Commonwealth Federation, the party adopted what was then considered a radical platform, which called for some policies the Conservatives traditionally opposed, including the provision of universal healthcare, and rebranded itself as the Progressive Conservative Party.

=== Leadership election ===
On February 15, 1944, H.E. Keown officially resigned from the leadership of the Progressive Conservative Party during the leadership convention that was to choose his successor. In his farewell address, Keown expressed a desire for his "successor as leader to be a man closely identified with agriculture." The leadership convention chose Ramsay, who was then a professor at the University of Saskatchewan, much to the delight of establishment members who desired an agricultural leader from Saskatoon. The Regina Leader-Post, which generally supported the Liberal Party at the time, spoke highly of Ramsay in an editorial.

As leader, Ramsay was heavily supported by the federal Progressive Conservative Party, which paid his salary as party leader since he simultaneously served as the Director of Organization in Saskatchewan for the federal party.

=== 1944 election ===
Liberal Premier William John Patterson called an election for June 15, 1944. Patterson had been in office for six years but was able to extend his government's mandate due to World War II. Ramsay's Progressive Conservatives ran a total of 39 candidates—not a full slate of 52. Ramsay's signature agricultural policy called for "fair prices for farm products by expanding trade by progressively lowering the barriers to trade." Despite this and many other novel platform commitments, the election was traded by voters as a two-way competition between the Liberal Party and the Co-operative Commonwealth Federation.

Tommy Douglas' Co-operative Commonwealth Federation overwhelmingly won the election with 53% of the popular vote, filling 47/52 legislature seats. In second place, the Liberals won 35% of the popular vote, filling the remaining seats. Ramsay's Progressive Conservatives won 12% of the popular vote and no seats—their third successive loss.

=== 1948 election ===
In the election of June 24, 1948, Ramsay faced now-Premier Tommy Douglas with his Co-operative Commonwealth Federation and the new leader of the Liberal Party, Walter Tucker, a former Member of Parliament. Tucker had sought to convince individual Progressive Conservative constituency associations not to run candidates against Liberal candidates to avert a vote-split. Ramsay refused to discuss Tucker's proposed formal coalition of the Liberal and Progressive Conservative campaigns.

Ramsay ran on a new platform that promised a wheat stabilization fund to provide security for farm income, and cooperation with the federal government as they developed a national universal healthcare plan. Ramsay's party only fielded nine candidates to run in the 52 ridings.

The Co-operative Commonwealth Federation was re-elected with 48% of the popular vote and 31/52 seats, while the Liberals won 31% of the popular vote and 19 seats. Both Ramsay's Progressive Conservatives and the new Social Credit Party won 8% of the vote and no seats.

=== Resignation ===
Following his loss in 1948, Ramsay announced that he would resign his leadership once a successor was found, although the party's executives delayed the leadership convention in hope that he would change his mind and continue to serve. In his final report to the party's executives, he wrote that he believed the "that Progressive Conservatives are through provincially in Saskatchewan."

Ramsay's favoured candidate, Alvin Hamilton, was elected to replace him on October 12, 1949.

== After politics ==
After resigning as party leader, Ramsay led the Memorial Union Building Fund at the University of Saskatchewan. Later, from 1951 to 1953, he served as the General Secretary of the Agricultural Institute of Canada in Ottawa. He then served as the Director of the University of Saskatchewan's Agricultural Extension Department until his death in 1962.

Ramsay advocated for a farmers' market in the suburbs of Saskatoon. He also helped to establish the University of Saskatchewan's Farm and Home Week and its Seed Fair, and contributed to revisions of the Guide for Farm Practice in Saskatchewan.
