= Kipling, Saskatchewan =

Town in Saskatchewan, Canada

Kipling
- Town
- Location of Kipling in Saskatchewan
- Coordinates: 50°6′5.36″N 102°37′56.64″W
- Country: Canada
- Province: Saskatchewan
- Rural municipality: Kingsley

Government
  - Mayor: Patricia Jackson

Population
  - Total: 1,140
- Time zone: UTC−6 (Central (CST))
- Website: http://www.townofkipling.ca/

Kipling is a town in southeast Saskatchewan, Canada. In provincial politics, Kipling is in the constituency of Moosomin. The town was named after the English author Rudyard Kipling who passed through the town on 4 October 1907. Kipling is accessed from Highway 48.

== History ==
Kipling sites classed as "heritage properties" include the former CN station, built in 1908–09, and the Kingsley rural municipality office, built in 1919. In addition, a major and highly interesting group of pioneer-era buildings can be viewed on the spacious sites belonging to the Kipling and District Historical Society Museum. The Kipling and District Museum (1903–59) is a Municipal Heritage Property on the Canadian Register of Historic Places.

In 2006, Canadian blogger Kyle MacDonald successfully parlayed one red paperclip via a series of trades into a house in Kipling. The town commemorates the story with the Guinness World Record certified World's Largest Paper Clip, 15 feet tall and weighing 3,043 pounds.

== Demographics ==
In the 2021 Census of Population conducted by Statistics Canada, Kipling had a population of 1,076 living in 464 of its 523 total private dwellings, a change of 0.2% from its 2016 population of 1,074. With a land area of 2.55 km^{2} (0.98 sq mi), it had a population density of 422.0/km^{2} (1,092.9/sq mi) in 2021.

== Government ==
As of 2017 Kipling is within the provincial constituency of Moosomin, and is represented in the Legislative Assembly of Saskatchewan by Steven Bonk of the Saskatchewan Party.

Federally, Kipling is in the riding of Souris—Moose Mountain, and is represented in the 42nd Parliament by Robert Kitchen, of the Conservative Party of Canada.

== Climate ==
Climate data for Kipling
Month	Jan	Feb	Mar	Apr	May	Jun	Jul	Aug	Sep	Oct	Nov	Dec	Year
Record high °C (°F)	6.7 (44.1)	11 (52)	20.6 (69.1)	31.7 (89.1)	36.7 (98.1)	36.7 (98.1)	38 (100)	38.3 (100.9)	35 (95)	31 (88)	21.7 (71.1)	9.5 (49.1)	38.3 (100.9)
Mean daily maximum °C (°F)	−11 (12)	−7.1 (19.2)	−0.5 (31.1)	9.5 (49.1)	17.5 (63.5)	22 (72)	24.5 (76.1)	23.4 (74.1)	17.2 (63.0)	9.9 (49.8)	−1.2 (29.8)	−8.6 (16.5)	8 (46)
Daily mean °C (°F)	−16.5 (2.3)	−12.5 (9.5)	−6 (21)	3.3 (37.9)	10.9 (51.6)	15.6 (60.1)	18 (64)	16.6 (61.9)	10.7 (51.3)	3.9 (39.0)	−5.9 (21.4)	−13.7 (7.3)	2 (36)
Mean daily minimum °C (°F)	−21.9 (−7.4)	−17.7 (0.1)	−11.4 (11.5)	−2.9 (26.8)	4.3 (39.7)	9.2 (48.6)	11.3 (52.3)	9.8 (49.6)	4.2 (39.6)	−2 (28)	−10.5 (13.1)	−18.6 (−1.5)	−3.9 (25.0)
Record low °C (°F)	−44.4 (−47.9)	−41.7 (−43.1)	−40 (−40)	−26.7 (−16.1)	−12.8 (9.0)	−3.3 (26.1)	1.7 (35.1)	−2 (28)	−8.9 (16.0)	−23 (−9)	−34.4 (−29.9)	−43 (−45)	−44.4 (−47.9)
Average precipitation mm (inches)	20.4 (0.80)	17.5 (0.69)	25.3 (1.00)	28.2 (1.11)	53.4 (2.10)	75.3 (2.96)	65.4 (2.57)	60.4 (2.38)	46.4 (1.83)	27.4 (1.08)	17.8 (0.70)	23.9 (0.94)	461.3 (18.16)
Source: Environment Canada

== Sports ==
The Kipling/Windthorst Oil Kings of the senior men's Big 6 Hockey League play in the local arena.

The Kipling Royals of the Saskota Baseball League play at the ball diamonds in Kipling.

== See also ==
- List of towns in Saskatchewan
- List of communities in Saskatchewan

== Other sources ==
- The Unforgiving Minute – A Life of Rudyard Kipling Harry Ricketts, Pimlico, 2000 ISBN 0-7126-6471-8
- What was he doing out?- The Province, Page A8, Vancouver BC Brett Popplewell, Canadian Press, August 3, 2006
