= Daniel David Ellis =

Canadian politician

Daniel David Ellis (January 6, 1860 – 1927) was a physician and political figure in Saskatchewan. He represented Moosomin in the Legislative Assembly of Saskatchewan from 1905 to 1908 as a Provincial Rights Party member.

He was born in Wallace, Canada West, the son of Elijah Ellis, a native of Ireland, and was educated there, in Listowel and at the University of Toronto. In 1899, Ellis married Wilhelmina, the daughter of John George Hess. Ellis served as medical health officer for Stratford, Ontario and was a surgeon for the Perth County militia. Ellis served as provincial Grand Master for the Orange Lodge in Saskatchewan. He was defeated by Alexander S. Smith when he ran for reelection to the Saskatchewan assembly in 1908.
