= Alexander Duff Connon =

Canadian politician

Alexander Duff "Alex" Connon (March 25, 1891 – December 17, 1975) was a Scottish-born railway conductor and political figure in Saskatchewan. He represented The Battlefords from 1944 to 1948 in the Legislative Assembly of Saskatchewan as a Co-operative Commonwealth Federation (CCF) member.

He was born in Aberdeen, the son of William Connon and Margaret Jane Dunbar, and was educated there and in Brandon, Manitoba. Connon came to Canada with his family in 1905. In 1914, he married Grace Olive Davis. Connon lived in North Battleford, Saskatchewan. He worked as a conductor for the Canadian National Railway. He was defeated by Paul Prince in 1948 when he ran for reelection to the provincial assembly and was unsuccessful again in a 1950 by-election held following Prince's death.
