= Kevin Weedmark =

Canadian journalist

Kevin Weedmark MLA

Member of the Saskatchewan Legislative Assembly for Moosomin-Montmartre
- Incumbent
- Assumed office October 28, 2024
- Preceded by: Steven Bonk

Personal details
- Born: 1966 (age 59–60)
- Party: Saskatchewan Party

Kevin Weedmark is the Saskatchewan Party Member of the Legislative Assembly representing the constituency of Moosomin-Montmartre. He was first elected in the 2024 Saskatchewan general election and currently serves as the deputy government whip.

Weedmark won a contested nomination over two other challengers to become the Saskatchewan Party candidate in 2024. It followed former MLA Steven Bonk's exit from provincial politics to seek the federal Conservative Party nomination in Souris-Moose Mountain.

Previously, Weedmark was editor of The World-Spectator, a weekly newspaper. The paper's current editor is Weedmark's wife, Kara Kinna. He also is a founding member of the Community Builders Alliance, which assists local businesses, and has volunteered with his local church, chamber of commerce, housing authority board, and economic development committee.
