= Brittney Senger =

Canadian politician

Brittney Senger MLA

Member of the Saskatchewan Legislative Assembly for Saskatoon Southeast
- Incumbent
- Assumed office October 28, 2024
- Preceded by: Don Morgan

Shadow Minister for Ethics and Democracy, Disabilities and Community-Based Organizations
- Incumbent
- Assumed office June 3, 2025
- Preceded by: Jacqueline Roy

Personal details
- Party: Saskatchewan NDP
- Education: University of Saskatchewan (B.A)

Brittney Senger is a Canadian politician who was elected to the Legislative Assembly of Saskatchewan in the 2024 general election, representing Saskatoon Southeast as a member of the New Democratic Party.
