= Steven Bonk =

Canadian politician

The Honourable Steven Bonk ECS MP

Member of Parliament for Souris—Moose Mountain
- Incumbent
- Assumed office April 28, 2025
- Preceded by: Robert Kitchen

Member of the Saskatchewan Legislative Assembly for Moosomin
- In office April 4, 2016 – October 1, 2024
- Preceded by: Don Toth
- Succeeded by: Kevin Weedmark

Personal details
- Party: Saskatchewan Party (provincial); Conservative Party of Canada (federal)

Steven Bonk MP is a Canadian politician, who was elected to the Legislative Assembly of Saskatchewan in the 2016 provincial election. He represented the electoral district of Moosomin as a member of the Saskatchewan Party until 2024.

In August 2024, he won the nomination for the Conservative Party of Canada for Souris—Moose Mountain in the 2025 Canadian federal election. He was elected.

At the time of the 2025 Canadian federal election, he lived in Wolseley, Saskatchewan.

== Electoral record ==
2025 Canadian federal election: Souris—Moose Mountain
Party	Candidate	Votes	%	±%	Expenditures
Conservative	Steven Bonk	34,793	83.7%		
Liberal	Aziz Mian	4,051	9.7%		
New Democratic	Sheena Muirhead Koops	1,888	4.5%		
Green	Remi Rheault	371	0.9%		
Canadian Future	Lyndon Dayman	304	0.7%		
Independent	Travis Patron	157	0.4%		
Total valid votes/expense limit					
Total rejected ballots					
Turnout		41,564			
Eligible voters					
Source: Elections Canada

2020 Saskatchewan general election: Moosomin
Party	Candidate	Votes	%	±%
Saskatchewan	Steven Bonk	5,467	77.78	+5.47
New Democratic	Ken Burton	1,143	16.26	+1.75
Progressive Conservative	Frank Serfas	248	3.53	-0.46
Green	Marjorie Graham	171	2.43	-1.00
Total valid votes		7,029	99.56	
Total rejected ballots		31	0.44	–
Turnout		7,060	–	–
Eligible voters		–		
Saskatchewan hold		Swing		–
Source: Elections Saskatchewan

2016 Saskatchewan general election: Moosomin
Party	Candidate	Votes	%	±%
Saskatchewan	Steven Bonk	5,142	72.31	-4.75
New Democratic	Ashlee Hicks	1,032	14.51	-5.42
Progressive Conservative	Lloyd Hauser	284	3.99	-
Green	Kate Ecklund	244	3.43	+0.42
Independent	Trevor Bearance	218	3.00	-
Liberal	Janice Palmer	191	2.68	-
Total valid votes		–	100.0	
Eligible voters		–		
Source: Elections Saskatchewan

== Cabinet positions ==
Saskatchewan provincial government of Brad Wall
Cabinet post (1)
Predecessor	Office	Successor
Jeremy Harrison	Minister of the Economy; August 30, 2017–February 2, 2018	Jeremy Harrison
