= Paul Prince =

Canadian politician

Paul Prince (February 23, 1897 – December 17, 1949) was a merchant and political figure in Saskatchewan. He represented The Battlefords from 1940 to 1944 and from 1948 to 1949 in the Legislative Assembly of Saskatchewan as a Liberal.

He was born in Battleford, Saskatchewan, the son of Benjamin Prince and Ernestine Brassard, and was educated there and at St. Boniface College in Manitoba. He served in the air force during World War I. In 1928, he married Leona Hennessy. Prince served as mayor of Battleford and as chairman of the local separate school board. He was first elected to the provincial assembly in a 1940 by-election held after John Gregory ran for election to the Canadian House of Commons. Prince was defeated when he ran for reelection to the assembly in 1944. He was elected again in 1948 but died in office the following year.
