= Larry Birkbeck =

Canadian politician

Larry Wayne Birkbeck (October 9, 1943 – August 29, 2016) is a consultant and former farmer and political figure in Saskatchewan. He represented Moosomin from 1975 to 1986 in the Legislative Assembly of Saskatchewan as a Progressive Conservative member.

He was born in Winnipeg, Manitoba, the son of James Birkbeck, and was educated in Welwyn and Rocanville. After completing his education, Birkbeck operated a dairy farm near Welwyn. He served as legislative secretary to government ministers Graham Taylor and Gordon Dirks. After retiring from politics in 1986, he established a consulting business. As of 2011, Birkbeck was living in Regina.

Larry died on August 29, 2016.
