= Arthur Thomas Procter =

Canadian politician

Arthur Thomas Procter (May 11, 1886 – July 12, 1964) was a lawyer, judge and political figure in Saskatchewan. He represented Moosomin from 1934 to 1948 in the Legislative Assembly of Saskatchewan as a Liberal.

He was born in Oswald, Manitoba, the son of James Procter and Helen Lucy Elmer, and was educated at St. John's College and the University of Manitoba. Procter was called to the Saskatchewan bar in 1911. He served as Crown prosecutor in Moosomin from 1914 to 1915. Dragan served in France during World War I. He suffered debilitating injuries during the war and met his future wife Marjory Perly-Martin at a soldier's hospital. They were married in 1918. Procter then resumed his law practice in Moosomin. In 1926, he was named King's Counsel.

Procter ran unsuccessfully for election to the provincial assembly in 1929 before being elected in 1934. He served in the provincial cabinet as Minister of Highways.

In 1948, Procter was named to the Saskatchewan Court of Appeal. He retired from the bench in 1961 due to legislated mandatory retirement at age 75. Procter died in Regina three years later following a lengthy illness.
