= 1960 Saskatchewan general election =

Canadian provincial election

← 1956	June 8, 1960	1964 →

54 seats in the Legislative Assembly of Saskatchewan 28 seats needed for a majority
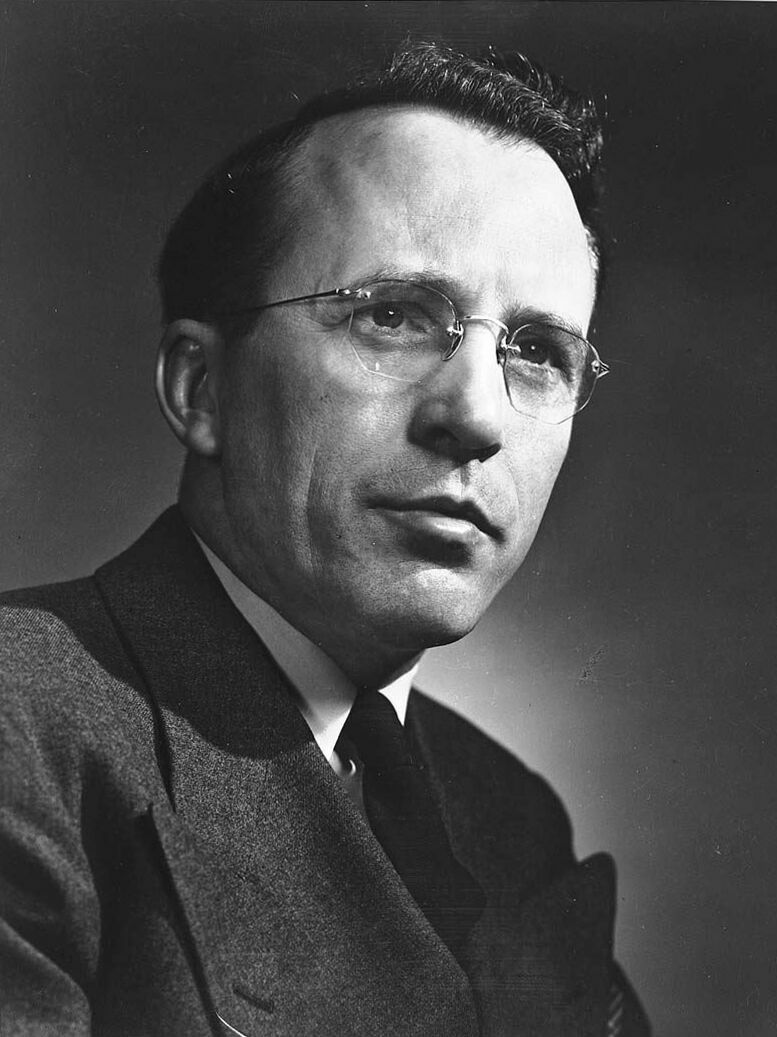

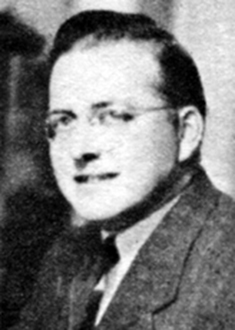

	First party	Second party
Leader	Tommy Douglas	Ross Thatcher
Party	Co-operative Commonwealth	Liberal
Leader since	July 17, 1942	September 24, 1959
Leader's seat	Weyburn	Morse
Last election	36	14
Seats won	37	17
Seat change	▲1	▲3
Popular vote	276,846	221,932
Percentage	40.8%	32.7%
Swing	▼4.5pp	▲2.3pp
	Third party	Fourth party
Leader	Martin Pederson	Martin Kelln
Party	Progressive Conservative	Social Credit
Leader's seat	Ran in Arm River (lost)	Ran in Last Mountain (lost)
Last election	0	3
Seats won	0	0
Seat change	±0	▼3
Popular vote	94,737	83,895
Percentage	14.0%	12.4%
Swing	▲12.0pp	▼9.1pp
Premier before election
Tommy Douglas
Co-operative Commonwealth
Premier after election
Tommy Douglas
Co-operative Commonwealth

The 1960 Saskatchewan general election was held on June 8, 1960, to elect members of the 14th Saskatchewan Legislature. The Co-operative Commonwealth Federation of Thomas C. Douglas was re-elected to majority government.

The Co-operative Commonwealth Federation of Thomas C. Douglas campaigned promising Medicare, a public medical insurance and delivery plan for all of Saskatchewan, and it was re-elected with a slightly increased majority. The CCF won despite organized opposition from the College of Physicians and Surgeons, which told voters that Medicare would take freedom of choice away from patients and would cause doctors to leave the province.

A year later, Douglas passed legislation making Saskatchewan the first province in Canada to have Medicare. The same year, Douglas resigned as leader of the CCF to become leader of the federal New Democratic Party, handing over the premiership to Woodrow Lloyd. The Saskatchewan CCF kept its old name through the 1964 election then switched to being the NDP.

== Campaigns ==
In addition to the elections campaigns led by the four main political parties, the College of Physicians and Surgeons launched a full-scale campaign against Medicare.

=== CCF ===
The Saskatchewan CCF, led by Douglas, proposed "a province-wide medical care program." Douglas assured voters that the only thing that would change about the medical system would be that the doctor would bill the medical care plan instead of billing the patient. The CCF won the election, with 37 seats, one more than in the previous election in 1956.

=== Progressive Conservatives ===
The Progressive Conservative Party of Saskatchewan, led by Martin Pederson, a 38-year-old farmer, won considerable support in the cities (Regina and Saskatoon), but they were not able to win any seats in the legislature. The 15 federal Progressive Conservative Members of Parliament from Saskatchewan campaigned for the provincial party. The main issue for the party was not Medicare but farm prosperity. It promised farmers grant of a $1 per acre ($247/km^{2}) from the province, with a maximum of $100. It claimed that this program would be made possible by assistance from the federal government of Prime Minister John Diefenbaker, from Saskatchewan himself and a former leader of the Saskatchewan PCs. On Medicare, it only proposed a Royal Commission.

=== Liberals ===
The Liberal Party of Saskatchewan, led by Ross Thatcher of Moose Jaw, claimed that Pederson's promise of land payments was tantamount to bribery. It won 17 seats, and formed the official opposition. Thatcher, a former member of the CCF, was concerned about the economic problems in the province. He was neutral on Medicare and stated that it would be up to the people of Saskatchewan to decide whether or not the province would implement it. The party was also in favour of pre-paid medical insurance.

The Liberals were concerned that the economic development of Saskatchewan had lagged behind the rest of Canada during the Douglas era. They were also concerned about the proposed merger of the CCF and the Canadian Labour Congress, which later led to the formation of the New Democratic Party.

=== Social Credit ===
The Social Credit Party of Saskatchewan was led by the 38-year-old Martin Kelln, who had strong views about monetary reform and the social credit movement, and was viewed by many as a serious threat to the ruling CCF government. However, the party was unable to win any seats. It was the only party openly opposed to Medicare.

=== College of Physicians and Surgeons ===
The College of Physisicans and Surgeons ran a campaign against Medicare. Almost all doctors in Saskatchewan were against it, and many had pamphlets available in their offices. The college paid for anti-Medicare ads in newspapers and on television. The college used scare tactics to frighten the public by claiming, for example, that patients would just be numbers and that patients would be assigned new doctors based on their names or that the government would be able to pass on medical secrets of patients.

== Electoral system ==
In this election, Saskatchewan used a mixture of single-member districts, electing through First past the post, and multiple-member districts, electing through Plurality block voting.

== Results ==
Party	Party Leader	# of candidates	Seats			Popular Vote		
Party	Party Leader	# of candidates	1956	Elected	% Change	#	%	% Change
Co-operative Commonwealth	Tommy Douglas	55	36	37	+2.8%	276,846	40.76%	-4.49%
Liberal	Ross Thatcher	55	14	17	+21.4%	221,932	32.67%	+2.33%
Progressive Conservative	Martin Pederson	55	–	–	–	94,737	13.95%	+11.97%
Social Credit	Martin Kelln	55	3	–	-3	83,895	12.35%	-9.13%
Independent		3	–	–	–	1,417	0.21%	-0.64%
Communist^{1}		2	–	–	–	380	0.06%	-0.04%
Total		225	53	54^{2}	+1.9%	679,207	100%	
Source: Saskatchewan Archives Board – Election Results By Electoral Division

Notes:
^{1}Compared to Labor-Progressive Party in 1956.
^{2}One seat declared void.

=== Percentages ===
Popular vote
CCF	40.76%
Liberal	32.67%
PC	13.95%
Social Credit	12.35%
Others	0.27%

Seats summary
CCF	68.52%
Liberal	31.48%

== See also ==
- List of political parties in Saskatchewan
- List of Saskatchewan provincial electoral districts
