= 1956 Saskatchewan general election =

Canadian provincial election

- June 20, 1956

53 seats in the Legislative Assembly of Saskatchewan 27 seats needed for a majority
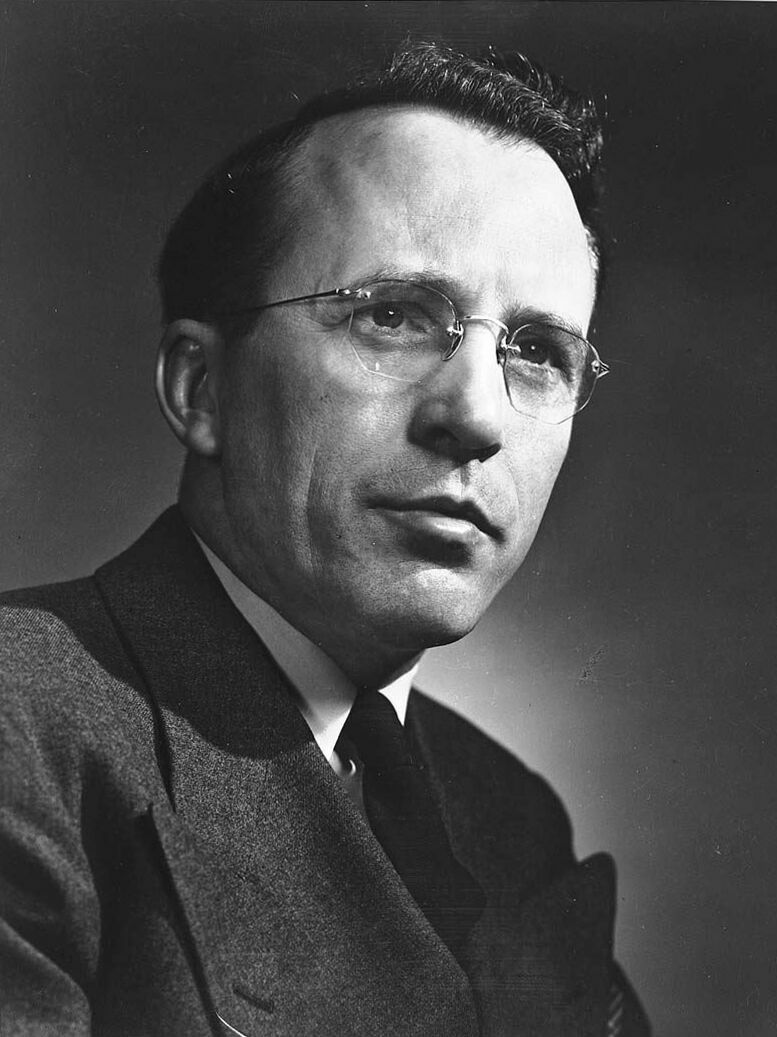
	First party	Second party	Third party
		LIB	SC
Leader	Tommy Douglas	Alexander McDonald	—
Party	Co-operative Commonwealth	Liberal	Social Credit
Leader since	July 17, 1942	November 26, 1954	—
Leader's seat	Weyburn	Moosomin	—
Last election	42	11	0
Seats won	36	14	3
Seat change	▼6	▲3	▲3
Popular vote	249,634	167,427	118,491
Percentage	45.3%	30.3%	21.5%
Swing	▼8.8pp	▼8.9pp	▲17.6pp
Premier before election
Tommy Douglas
Co-operative Commonwealth
Premier after election
Tommy Douglas
Co-operative Commonwealth

The 1956 Saskatchewan general election, the thirteenth in the province's history, was held on June 20, 1956, to elect members of the Legislative Assembly of Saskatchewan. The Co-operative Commonwealth Federation government of Premier Tommy Douglas was re-elected to a fourth consecutive majority government.

== Summary ==
Tommy Douglas' Co-operative Commonwealth Federation (CCF) secured a majority government, despite its share of the popular vote decreasing close to 10%. The party won 6 fewer seats than it had in the 1952 election. The election victory secured a fourth term in office.

The Liberal Party of Alexander H. McDonald also lost votes, but picked up an additional three seats.

The Social Credit Party rebounded from its poor results in previous elections, surging to win over 21% of the popular vote. However, because this vote was widely distributed across the province, the party won only 3 seats in the legislature under the first-past-the-post system.

== Results ==
Party	Party Leader	# of candidates	Seats			Popular Vote		
Party	Party Leader	# of candidates	1952	Elected	% Change	#	%	% Change
Co-operative Commonwealth	Tommy Douglas	53	42	36	-14.3%	249,634	45.25%	-8.81%
Liberal	Alexander McDonald	52	11	14	+27.3%	167,427	30.34%	-8.93%
Social Credit		53	–	3		118,491	21.48%	+17.58%
Progressive Conservative	Alvin Hamilton	9	–	–	–	10,921	1.98%	+0.01%
Independent		2	–	–	–	4,714	0.85%	+0.57%
Labor-Progressive		2	–	–	–	536	0.10%	-0.11%
Total		171	53	53	–	551,723	100%	
Source: Elections Saskatchewan

=== Percentages ===
Popular vote
CCF	45.25%
Liberal	30.34%
Social Credit	21.48%
PC	1.98%
Others	0.95%

Seats summary
CCF	67.92%
Liberal	26.42%
Social Credit	5.66%

== See also ==
- List of political parties in Saskatchewan
- List of Saskatchewan provincial electoral districts
