= Social Credit Party of Saskatchewan =

- Founded: 1935
- Dissolved: 1970s
- Ideology: Social credit Agrarianism; Christian right Economic liberalism Right-wing populism
- Political position: Right-wing
- Colours: Green
- Politics of Saskatchewan; Political parties; Former provincial party

The Social Credit Party of Saskatchewan, originally known as the Social Credit League of Saskatchewan, was a political party in the Canadian province of Saskatchewan that promoted social credit economic theories from the mid-1930s to the mid-1970s.

== History ==
Social Credit first appeared in Saskatchewan in the 1935 federal election, when the party received 20% of the popular vote and won two seats in Kindersley and The Battlefords. The party fought its first provincial campaign in the 1938 election. With Social Credit (Socreds) having taken power in neighbouring Alberta in 1935, the governing Liberals and opposition Co-operative Commonwealth Federation (CCF) both saw the Saskatchewan Socreds as a threat, and campaigned against the party, even characterizing Alberta Social Credit Premier William Aberhart as a "despot intent on ruling the province from Edmonton". In Saskatchewan, the Socreds, nominally under the leadership of Social Credit Member of Parliament Joseph Needham—Needham served as president of the Saskatchewan Party into the 1940s—earned 15.9% of the popular vote, but only two candidates were elected to the Legislature. The Liberals remained in power with the CCF in Opposition—it is likely that the success of the CCF, which largely represented the agrarian movement in Saskatchewan, tempered the prospects for Social Credit in the province. In fact, in the subsequent election in 1944, Social Credit virtually disappeared, nominating only one candidate, who received only 249 votes, while the CCF won a large majority government.

The Saskatchewan Socreds, led by Joshua Haldeman (later grandfather of Elon Musk), recovered somewhat in the 1948 provincial election. It nominated 36 candidates and received eight per cent of the popular vote, though no candidates were elected. The party surged in the 1956 provincial election, earning 22% of the popular vote and electing three members.

The Social Credit vote fell to 12.4% in the 1960 election. Although the party nominated a few candidates in the two subsequent elections, it could not win more than 0.4% of the popular vote or win a seat. The party did not contest elections after 1967.

=== Failed merger ===
Ed Nasserden, leader of the Progressive Conservative Party, called for a merger with Social Credit in November 1970, and the two parties entered into talks. The move was mostly supported by the Progressive Conservatives, but some members of the Social Credit Party were, according to former leader Lloyd Avram, "...skeptical of our ability to get our views of monetary reform across in a merged party." Social Credit members ultimately voted against the merger in February 1971. Following the vote, Social Credit emerged as a divided party, and did not contest the 1971 and 1975 provincial elections. During that period, Social Credit was without a leader, and chose to focus on educating the people of Saskatchewan about the party's beliefs and values. However, the party dissolved, never contesting another provincial election.

== Electoral performance ==
Social Credit contested every provincial election between 1938 and 1967, though the party ran only leader Joseph Needham in 1944. The party received the third highest vote share among parties on four occasions, achieving a high-water mark of 21.5% of the vote in 1956; however, only twice were any members elected to the Legislature—two in 1938, and three in 1956.

=== Legislative Assembly ===
Election	Leader	Votes	%	Seats	+/–	Position	Status
1938	Joseph Needham	70,084	15.9	2 / 52	▲2	▲3rd	Third party
1944	Joseph Needham	249	0.1	0 / 52	▼2	▼5th	No status
1948	Joshua Haldeman	40,268	8.1	0 / 52	0	▲3rd	No status
1952	Vacant	21,045	3.9	0 / 53	0	3rd	No status
1956	Vacant	118,491	21.5	3 / 53	▲3	3rd	Third party
1960	Martin Kelln	83,895	12.4	0 / 54	▼0	▼4th	No status
1964	Martin Kelln	2,621	0.4	0 / 59	0	4th	No status
1967	Vacant	1,296	0.3	0 / 59	0	4th	No status

== See also ==
- Canadian social credit movement
- Social Credit Party of Canada
- List of Saskatchewan political parties
- Politics of Saskatchewan
