= 1952 Saskatchewan general election =

Canadian provincial election

← 1948	June 11, 1952	1956 →

53 seats in the Legislative Assembly of Saskatchewan 27 seats needed for a majority
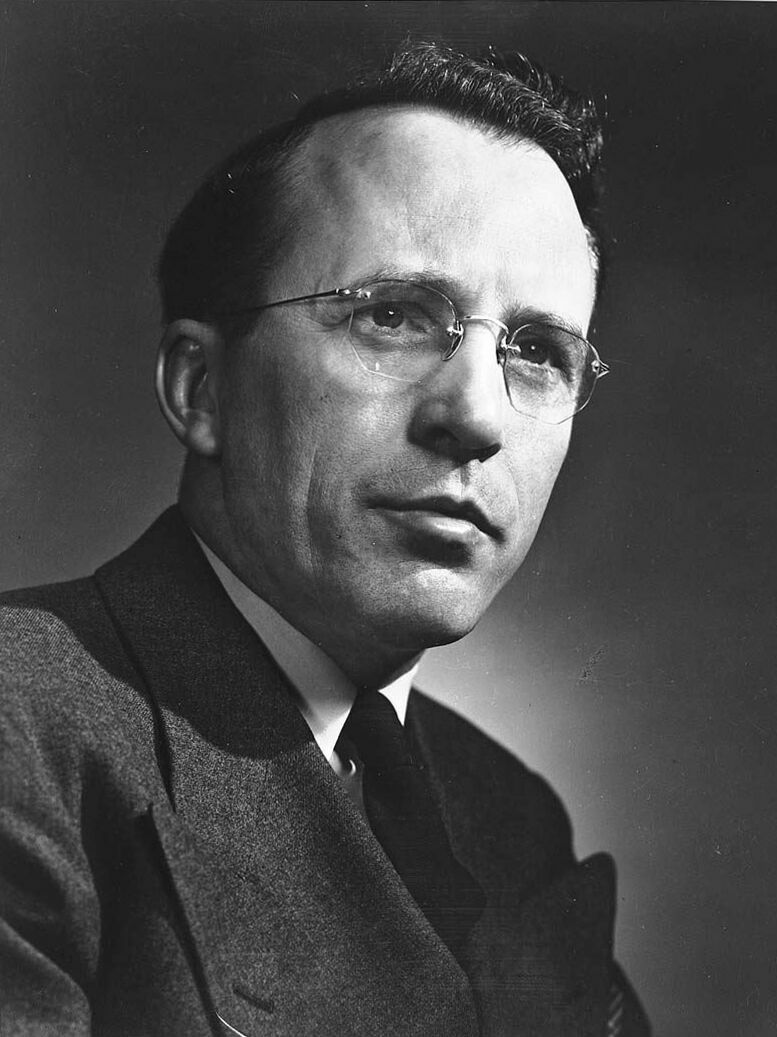

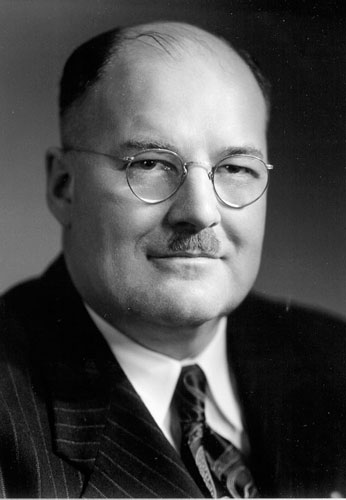
	First party	Second party
Leader	Tommy Douglas	Walter Tucker
Party	Co-operative Commonwealth	Liberal
Leader since	July 17, 1942	August 6, 1946
Leader's seat	Weyburn	Rosthern
Last election	31	19
Seats won	42	11
Seat change	▲11	▼8
Popular vote	291,705	211,882
Percentage	54.1%	39.3%
Swing	▲6.5pp	▲8.7pp
Premier before election
Tommy Douglas
Co-operative Commonwealth
Premier after election
Tommy Douglas
Co-operative Commonwealth

The 1952 Saskatchewan general election, the twelfth in the history of the province, was held on June 11, 1952, to elect members of the Legislative Assembly of Saskatchewan. The Co-operative Commonwealth Federation government of Premier Tommy Douglas was re-elected for a third term with a majority government.

== Summary ==
Tommy Douglas' Co-operative Commonwealth Federation (CCF) was re-elected with an increased majority and their highest share of the popular vote, an outright majority of 54.1%. This was the highest share of the vote won by any government since Thomas Walter Scott's Liberals took 57% of the vote in the 1912 election. After the 1952 election, the CCF held 42 of 53 seats in the Assembly.

The Liberal Party of Walter Tucker increased its share of the popular vote to almost 40%, but lost 9 of the seats it had held in the previous legislature.

The Social Credit and Progressive Conservative parties continued to lose support, securing less than 6% of the vote between them.

This election was held using a mixture of single-member districts and multi-member districts. Regina elected three members, while Saskatoon and Moose Jaw City elected two each. Every voter in those districts could cast as many votes as there were seats to fill in the district (Block Voting). Each multi-member district elected a one-party sweep of the district's seats. There was no proportionality.

== Results ==
Party	Party Leader	# of candidates	Seats			Popular Vote		
Party	Party Leader	# of candidates	1948	Elected	% Change	#	%	% Change
Co-operative Commonwealth	Tommy Douglas	53	31	42	+35.5%	291,705	54.06%	+6.50%
Liberal	Walter Tucker	53	20	11	-42.1%	211,882	39.27%	+8.67%
Social Credit		24	–	–	–	21,045	3.90%	-4.19%
Progressive Conservative	Alvin Hamilton	8	–	–	–	10,648	1.97%	-5.66%
Independent-Prog. Conservative		1	*	–	*	1,542	0.29%	*
Independent		3	1	–	-100%	1,517	0.28%	-1.95%
Labor–Progressive		2	–	–	–	1,151	0.21%	-0.05%
Independent Liberal		1	–	–	–	103	0.02%	-0.64%
Total		145	52	53	+1.9%	539,593	100%	
Source: Elections Saskatchewan

Note: * Party did not nominate candidates in previous election.

Popular vote
CCF	54.06%
Liberal	39.27%
Social Credit	3.90%
PC	1.97%
Others	0.80%

Seats summary
CCF	79.25%
Liberal	20.75%

== See also ==
- List of political parties in Saskatchewan
- List of Saskatchewan provincial electoral districts
