= Legislative Assembly of Saskatchewan =

Legislative chamber of the Saskatchewan Legislature

- 30th Saskatchewan Legislature

Type
- Type: Unicameral chamber of the Saskatchewan Legislature

History
- Founded: 1905
- Preceded by: North-West Legislative Assembly

Leadership
- Speaker: Todd Goudy, Saskatchewan Party since November 25, 2024
- Deputy Speaker: Blaine McLeod, Saskatchewan Party since November 26, 2024
- Premier: Scott Moe, Saskatchewan Party since February 2, 2018
- Leader of the Opposition: Carla Beck, New Democratic since June 26, 2022
- Government House Leader: Tim McLeod, Saskatchewan Party since November 7, 2024
- Opposition House Leader: Nicole Sarauer, New Democratic since October 5, 2022

Structure
- Seats: 61
- Political groups: Government of Saskatchewan: Saskatchewan (34); Official Opposition: New Democratic (26); Others: Independent (1)

Elections
- Last election: October 28, 2024
- Next election: On or before October 30, 2028

Meeting place
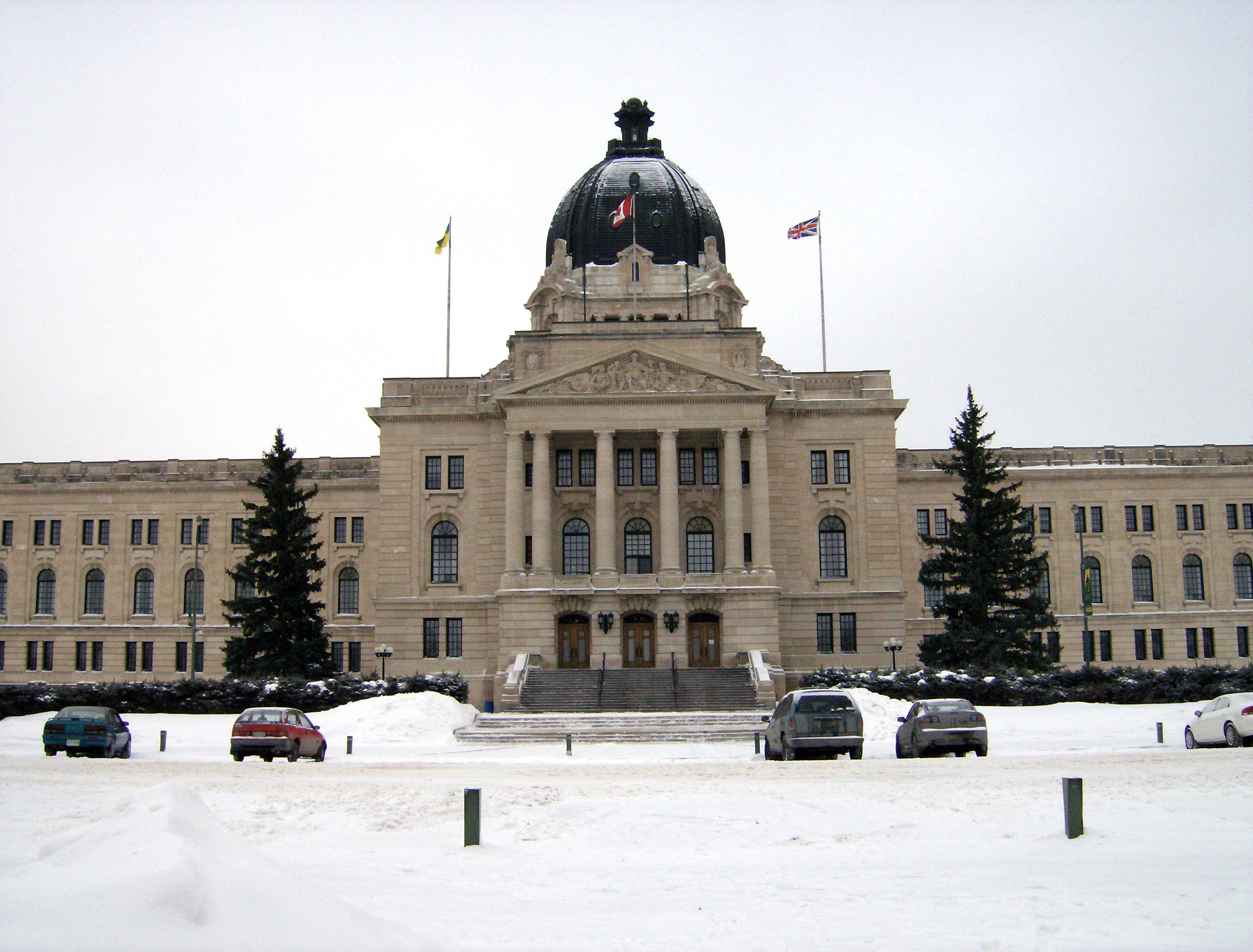
- Legislative Building, Regina, Saskatchewan, Canada

Website
- www.legassembly.sk.ca

The Legislative Assembly of Saskatchewan (French: Assemblée législative de la Saskatchewan) is the legislative chamber of the Saskatchewan Legislature in the province of Saskatchewan, Canada. Bills passed by the assembly are given royal assent by the lieutenant governor of Saskatchewan, in the name of the King of Canada. The assembly meets at the Saskatchewan Legislative Building in Regina.

There are 61 constituencies in the province, which elect members of the Legislative Assembly (MLAs). All are single-member districts, though the cities of Regina, Saskatoon and Moose Jaw were in the past represented through multi-member districts, with members elected through block voting.

The legislature has been unicameral since its establishment; there has never been a provincial upper house.

The 30th Saskatchewan Legislature was elected at the 2024 Saskatchewan general election.

== Assemblies ==
Legislature	Start	End	Premier	Opposition Leader
1st	1905	1908	Walter Scott	Frederick Haultain
2nd	1908	1912	Walter Scott	Frederick Haultain
3rd	1912	1917	Walter Scott	Wellington Willoughby
3rd	1912	1917	William Martin	Wellington Willoughby
4th	1917	1921	William Martin	Donald Maclean
5th	1921	1925	William Martin	John Maharg
5th	1921	1925	Charles Dunning	Harris Turner
6th	1925	1929	Charles Dunning	Charles Tran
6th	1925	1929	James Gardiner	James Anderson
7th	1929	1934	James Gardiner	James Anderson
7th	1929	1934	James Anderson	James Gardiner
8th	1934	1938	James Gardiner	George Williams
8th	1934	1938	William Patterson	George Williams
9th	1938	1944	William Patterson	George Williams
9th	1938	1944	William Patterson	John Brockelbank
10th	1944	1948	Tommy Douglas	William Patterson
11th	1948	1952	Tommy Douglas	Walter Tucker
12th	1952	1956	Tommy Douglas	Walter Tucker
12th	1952	1956	Tommy Douglas	Asmundur Loptson
12th	1952	1956	Tommy Douglas	Alexander McDonald
13th	1956	1960	Tommy Douglas	Alexander McDonald
14th	1960	1964	Tommy Douglas	Ross Thatcher
14th	1960	1964	Woodrow Lloyd	Ross Thatcher
15th	1964	1967	Ross Thatcher	Woodrow Lloyd
16th	1967	1971	Ross Thatcher	Woodrow Lloyd
16th	1967	1971	Ross Thatcher	Allan Blakeney
17th	1971	1975	Allan Blakeney	Ross Thatcher
17th	1971	1975	Allan Blakeney	David Steuart
18th	1975	1978	Allan Blakeney	David Steuart
18th	1975	1978	Allan Blakeney	Edward Malone
19th	1978	1982	Allan Blakeney	Richard Collver
19th	1978	1982	Allan Blakeney	Eric Berntson
20th	1982	1986	Grant Devine	Allan Blakeney
21st	1986	1991	Grant Devine	Allan Blakeney
21st	1986	1991	Grant Devine	Roy Romanow
22nd	1991	1995	Roy Romanow	Grant Devine
22nd	1991	1995	Roy Romanow	Rick Swenson
22nd	1991	1995	Roy Romanow	Bill Boyd
23rd	1995	1999	Roy Romanow	Lynda Haverstock
23rd	1995	1999	Roy Romanow	Ken Krawetz
24th	1999	2003	Roy Romanow	Elwin Hermanson
24th	1999	2003	Lorne Calvert	Elwin Hermanson
25th	2003	2007	Lorne Calvert	Elwin Hermanson
25th	2003	2007	Lorne Calvert	Brad Wall
26th	2007	2011	Brad Wall	Lorne Calvert
26th	2007	2011	Brad Wall	Dwain Lingenfelter
27th	2011	2016	Brad Wall	John Nilson
27th	2011	2016	Brad Wall	Cam Broten
28th	2016	2020	Brad Wall	Trent Wotherspoon
28th	2016	2020	Brad Wall	Nicole Sarauer
28th	2016	2020	Scott Moe	Ryan Meili
29th	2020	2024	Scott Moe	Ryan Meili
29th	2020	2024	Scott Moe	Carla Beck
30th	2024	current	Scott Moe	Carla Beck

== Party standings ==
The party standings in the Assembly are as follows:

Affiliation	Members
Saskatchewan Party	34
New Democratic Party	26
Independent	1
Total	61
Government Majority	7

== Members ==
Name	Party	Riding	First elected / previously elected	No.# of term(s)
Leroy Laliberte	New Democratic Party	Athabasca	2024	1st term
Darlene Rowden	Saskatchewan Party	Batoche	2024	1st term
**Daryl Harrison**	Saskatchewan Party	Cannington	2020	2nd term
Sean Wilson	Saskatchewan Party	Canora-Pelly	2024	1st term
Terri Bromm	Saskatchewan Party	Carrot River Valley	2024	1st term
Jordan McPhail	New Democratic Party	Cumberland	2024	1st term
James Thorsteinson	Saskatchewan Party	Cut Knife-Turtleford	2024	1st term
Doug Steele	Saskatchewan Party	Cypress Hills	2016	3rd term
Barret Kropf	Saskatchewan Party	Dakota-Arm River	2024	1st term
**Lori Carr**	Saskatchewan Party	Estevan-Big Muddy	2016	3rd term
Racquel Hilbert	Saskatchewan Party	Humboldt-Watrous	2024	1st term
Chris Beaudry	Saskatchewan Party	Kelvington-Wadena	2024	1st term
Kim Gartner	Saskatchewan Party	Kindersley-Biggar	2024	1st term
**Travis Keisig**	Saskatchewan Party	Last Mountain-Touchwood	2020	2nd term
Colleen Young	Saskatchewan Party	Lloydminster	2014	4th term
Blaine McLeod	Saskatchewan Party	Lumsden-Morse	2023	2nd term
Jamie Martens	Saskatchewan Party	Martensville-Blairmore	2024	1st term
**Jeremy Harrison**	Saskatchewan Party	Meadow Lake	2007	5th term
Todd Goudy^{†}	Saskatchewan Party	Melfort	2018	3rd term
**Warren Kaeding**	Saskatchewan Party	Melville-Saltcoats	2016	3rd term
**Tim McLeod**	Saskatchewan Party	Moose Jaw North	2020	2nd term
Megan Patterson	Saskatchewan Party	Moose Jaw Wakamow	2024	1st term
Kevin Weedmark	Saskatchewan Party	Moosomin-Montmartre	2024	1st term
Kevin Kasun	Saskatchewan Party	Prince Albert Carlton	2024	1st term
**Alana Ross**	Saskatchewan Party	Prince Albert Northcote	2020	2nd term
Noor Burki	New Democratic Party	Regina Coronation Park	2023	2nd term
Nicole Sarauer	New Democratic Party	Regina Douglas Park	2016	3rd term
Meara Conway	New Democratic Party	Regina Elphinstone-Centre	2020	2nd term
CARLA BECK	New Democratic Party	Regina Lakeview	2016	3rd term
Trent Wotherspoon	New Democratic Party	Regina Mount Royal	2007	5th term
Jacqueline Roy	New Democratic Party	Regina Northeast	2024	1st term
Bhajan Brar	New Democratic Party	Regina Pasqua	2024	1st term
Joan Pratchler	New Democratic Party	Regina Rochdale	2024	1st term
Aleana Young	New Democratic Party	Regina South Albert	2020	2nd term
Sally Housser	New Democratic Party	Regina University	2024	1st term
Jared Clarke	New Democratic Party	Regina Walsh Acres	2023	2nd term
Brent Blakley	New Democratic Party	Regina Wascana Plains	2024	1st term
**Jim Reiter**	Saskatchewan Party	Rosetown-Delisle	2007	5th term
**SCOTT MOE**	Saskatchewan Party	Rosthern-Shellbrook	2011	4th term
**Eric Schmalz**	Saskatchewan Party	Saskatchewan Rivers	2024	1st term
Betty Nippi-Albright	Independent	Saskatoon Centre	2020	2nd term
Don McBean	New Democratic Party	Saskatoon Chief Mistawasis	2024	1st term
Keith Jorgenson	New Democratic Party	Saskatoon Churchill-Wildwood	2024	1st term
Matt Love	New Democratic Party	Saskatoon Eastview	2020	2nd term
Vicki Mowat	New Democratic Party	Saskatoon Fairview	2017	3rd term
Nathaniel Teed	New Democratic Party	Saskatoon Meewasin	2022	2nd term
Erika Ritchie	New Democratic Party	Saskatoon Nutana	2020	2nd term
Kim Breckner	New Democratic Party	Saskatoon Riversdale	2024	1st term
Hugh Gordon	New Democratic Party	Saskatoon Silverspring	2024	1st term
Brittney Senger	New Democratic Party	Saskatoon Southeast	2024	1st term
Darcy Warrington	New Democratic Party	Saskatoon Stonebridge	2024	1st term
Tajinder Grewal	New Democratic Party	Saskatoon University-Sutherland	2024	1st term
April ChiefCalf	New Democratic Party	Saskatoon Westview	2024	1st term
**Ken Cheveldayoff**	Saskatchewan Party	Saskatoon Willowgrove	2003	6th term
**Everett Hindley**	Saskatchewan Party	Swift Current	2018	3rd term
**Jeremy Cockrill**	Saskatchewan Party	The Battlefords	2020	2nd term
**Terry Jenson**	Saskatchewan Party	Warman	2020	2nd term
Michael Weger	Saskatchewan Party	Weyburn-Bengough	2024	1st term
Brad Crassweller	Saskatchewan Party	White City-Qu'Appelle	2024	1st term
**Dave Marit**	Saskatchewan Party	Wood River	2016	3rd term
David Chan	Saskatchewan Party	Yorkton	2024	1st term

- Member in **BOLD CAPS** is the Premier of Saskatchewan.
- Members in **bold** are in the Cabinet of Saskatchewan.
- Members in italic are Legislative Secretaries to Cabinet Ministers.
- Member in CAPS is the Leader of the Opposition.

^{†} Speaker of the Assembly

== Current seating plan ==
		Jorgenson	Brar	Gordon	Warrington	Pratchler	Housser	Senger	Roy	McBean
		ChiefCalf	Grewal	Blakley	Conway	Sarauer	Breckner	McPhail	Laliberte	Clarke
		Ritchie	Burki	Nippi-	Mowat	BECK	Wotherspoon	Love	Teed	A. Young
Goudy
	D. Harrison	Kaeding	Marit	Cockrill	Reiter	MOE	Hindley	J. Harrison	Jenson	C. Young	Cheveldayoff	Keisig
	B. McLeod	Beaudry	Weedmark	Wilson	Carr	T. McLeod	Ross	Schmalz	Steele	Hilbert	Martens	Thorsteinson
				Crassweller	Kropf	Weger	Patterson	Bromm	Rowden	Chan	Gartner	Kasun

== Current Executive Council/Cabinet ==
For current cabinet see Executive Council of Saskatchewan.

== Officers ==
In September 2013 the assembly established the position of Usher of the Black Rod. Their role is functionally similar to the one for the Senate of Canada. Rick Mantey was the first person to hold the office. The current Usher of the Black Rod, as of 2014, is Ben Walsh.

The Black Rod was made by Scott Olson Goldsmith of Regina.

== See also ==
- List of Saskatchewan general elections
- Saskatchewan Legislative Building
- Monarchy in Saskatchewan
- Politics of Saskatchewan
- Saskatchewan Legislative Network
- Stopping the clock
- Hansard TV
