= 1934 Saskatchewan general election =

Canadian provincial election

- June 19, 1934

55 seats in the Legislative Assembly of Saskatchewan 28 seats needed for a majority
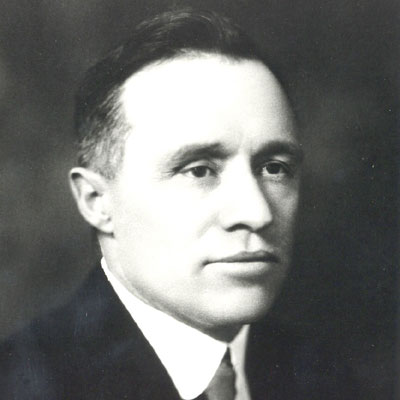

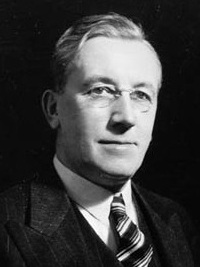

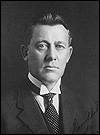
	First party	Second party	Third party
Leader	James Gardiner	Major James Coldwell	James Anderson
Party	Liberal	Farmer-Labour Group	Conservative
Leader since	February 25, 1926	July 27, 1932	March 25, 1924
Leader's seat	Melville	Ran in Regina City (lost)	Saskatoon City (lost re-election)
Last election	28	pre-creation	24
Seats won	50	5	0
Seat change	▲22	▲5	▼24
Popular vote	206,212	102,944	114,923
Percentage	48.00%	23.96%	26.75%
Swing	▲2.44pp	▲23.96pp	▼9.69pp
Premier before election
James Anderson
Conservative
Premier after election
James Gardiner
Liberal

The 1934 Saskatchewan general election was held on June 19, 1934, to elect members of the Legislative Assembly of Saskatchewan.

The Liberal Party of former premier James Gardiner was returned to power with a large majority – 50 of the 55 seats in the legislature – after the four year Conservative minority government interlude.

After forming a coalition government to oust the Liberals from power after the 1929 election, James T.M. Anderson's Conservative government had tried to use anti-Catholic and anti-French Canadian feeling in the province to win support. The Conservatives also had the support of the Ku Klux Klan, which was a significant force in the province at the time. The Tories also had to contend with the effects of the Great Depression and the prairie Dust Bowl, however; and although they won about a quarter of the popular vote, they won no seats in the legislature. The Conservatives remained a minor force in Saskatchewan politics for 40 years after this defeat.

The Tories' allies in the previous legislature – the Progressives – did not nominate candidates in this election, and were replaced by Farmer-Labour candidates as the voice of the Left in the province.

== Results ==
Party	Party leader	Candidates	Seats			Popular vote		
Party	Party leader	Candidates	1929	Elected	% Change	#	%	% Change
Liberal	James Gardiner	56	28	50	+78.6%	206,212	48.00%	+2.44%
Farmer–Labour	M.J. Coldwell	54	*	5	*	102,944	23.96%	*
Conservative	James Anderson	52	24	–	-100%	114,923	26.75%	-9.69%
Independent		3	6	–	-100%	2,949	0.69%	-8.37%
Labour	William G. Baker (default)	1	*	–	*	1,420	0.33%	*
United Front		3	*	–	*	1,053	0.24%	*
Independent Liberal		1	–	–	–	133	0.03%	-0.29%
Total		169	63	55	-12.7%	429,634	100%	
Source: Elections Saskatchewan

Note: * Party did not nominate candidates in previous election.

=== Percentages ===
Popular vote
Liberal	48.00%
Conservative	26.75%
Farmer–Labour	23.96%
Others	1.29%

Seats summary
Liberal	90.91%
Farmer–Labour	9.09%

=== Ranking ===
Party	Seats	Second	Third	Fourth
Liberal	50	6	0	0
Farmer–Labour	5	19	30	0
Conservative	0	30	21	1
Other parties	0	0	2	6

== Riding results ==
Names in bold represent cabinet ministers and the Speaker. Party leaders are italicized. The symbol " ** " indicates MLAs who are not running again.

=== Northwestern Saskatchewan ===
Electoral District	Candidates				Incumbent
Electoral District	Liberal	Farmer-Labour Group	Conservative	Other	Incumbent
Athabasca	Deakin Alexander Hall; 1,329			Jules Marion (Liberal) 970	New District
Cut Knife	Robert J. Gordon; 2,718	Andrew Macauley; 3,268	George McLean; 1,099		George John McLean
Meadow Lake	Donald MacDonald; 4,304	Charles Mycroft; 1,499	J.H. Storry; 1,281		New District
Rosthern	John Uhrich; 8,179	Philip J. Smith; 1,081	Donald Geo. McLean; 1,230		John Michael Uhrich
Shellbrook	Omer Demers; 5,238	Peter G. Makaroff; 2,332	Alexander F. Agnew; 2,209		Edgar Sidney Clinch**
The Battlefords	John Albert Gregory; 2,653	Hill Hamilton; 1,816	John Edmond McLarty; 1,600	Reginald James Jones (Ind. Liberal) 133	Samuel Wesley Huston**
Turtleford	Charles Ayre; 3,411	John Stegehuis; 1,489	Percival Whitman Farnsworth; 1,599		Charles Arthur Ayre
Wilkie	John Jardine; 3,702	George Jos. Hindley; 2,011	Alexander J. McLeod; 1,925		Alexander John McLeod

=== Northeastern Saskatchewan ===
Electoral District	Candidates				Incumbent
Electoral District	Liberal	Farmer-Labour Group	Conservative	Other	Incumbent
Humboldt	James Hogan; 5,345	Joe Burton; 2,771			Henry Mathies Therres**
Kelvington	George Ernest Dragan; 3,567	Robert Berkett Paterson; 1,628	John Robson Taylor; 981		New District
Kinistino	John Taylor; 2,772	Palmer Grambo; 1,835	R.E. Forbes; 1,074		John Richard Parish Taylor
Melfort	John D. MacFarlane; 3,972		Rupert J. Greaves; 3,252		Rupert James Greaves
Prince Albert	Thomas C. Davis; 5,474	Edward P. Spratt; 1,215	Samuel J.A. Branion; 2,007		Thomas Clayton Davis
Tisdale	Harvie J. Dorrance; 3,425	Jay Brice Ennis; 2,338	Walt C. Buckle; 2,407		Walter Clutterbuck Buckle
Wadena	Thorwald Berven; 3,069	George Williams; 3,890	Leonard Wreede; 738		John Robeson Taylor**

November 19, 1935 By-Election: Humboldt
Party	Candidate	Votes	%	±%
Liberal	Jim King	4,540	72.20%	+6.34%
Farmer–Labour	Joe Burton	1,748	27.80%	-6.34%
Total		6,288	100.00%	

=== West Central Saskatchewan ===
Electoral District	Candidates				Incumbent
Electoral District	Liberal	Farmer-Labour Group	Conservative	Other	Incumbent
Arm River	Gustaf Herman Danielson; 2,222	David James Christie; 912	Duncan Selby Hutcheon; 1,935		Duncan Selby Hutcheon
Biggar	Robert Pelham Hassard; 2,287	Warren Hart; 2,044	William Willoughby Miller; 1,296		William Willoughby Miller
Elrose	John A. Wilson; 2,213	Halvor Vindeg; 1,807	Donald Byron Grant; 1,390		James Cobban**
Hanley	Charles Agar; 2,843	Arthur J. Fahl; 1,405	John Thos. McOrmond; 1,703		Reginald Stipe**
Kerrobert	Donald Laing; 2,651	James Penberthy; 1,716	Robert Hanbidge; 1,788		Robert Leith Hanbidge
Kindersley	John C. Treleaven; 2,518	Louis H. Hantelman; 2,649	Robert H. Carruthers; 1,615		Ebenezer Samuel Whatley**
Rosetown	Neil McVicar; 2,433	Wilfrid A. Sibbald Tegart; 1,878	Nathan Given; 2,105		Nathaniel Given
Thunder Creek	Robert S. Donaldson; 1,608	C.A. Stuart; 1,003	H. Alexander Lilly; 1,396		Harold Alexander Lilly
Watrous	Bert Clement; 2,362	Alexander F. Murray; 1,829	Chester Cam. McClellan; 1,525		James Hogan

=== East Central Saskatchewan ===
Electoral District	Candidates				Incumbent
Electoral District	Liberal	Farmer-Labour Group	Conservative	Other	Incumbent
Last Mountain	Guy Hartsel Hummel; 2,732	Jacob Benson; 2,709	Allan Armstrong Peters; 1,338		Jacob Benson
Lumsden	Henry Phillip Mang; 2,352	Tom Johnston; 1,716	James Fraser Bryant; 1,070		James Fraser Bryant
Melville	**James G. Gardiner**; 4,989	Wilfrid Wass; 1,504	E. Forest Scharf; 1,930		New District
Pelly	Reginald J.M. Parker; 4,835	Andrew Danyleyko; 1,639	Frederick G. Garvin; 1,426	Walter E. Wiggins (United Front) 468	Reginald John Marsden Parker
Pheasant Hills	Asmundur A. Loptson; 4,310	H.J. Benson; 1,804	Chris Ness; 1,363		Charles Morton Dunn
Qu'Appelle-Wolseley	Frederick Middleton Dundas; 4,130	John H. Sturdy; 1,932	Stanley Withington Nichols; 2,627		Anton Huck**; South Qu'Appelle
Qu'Appelle-Wolseley	Frederick Middleton Dundas; 4,130	John H. Sturdy; 1,932	Stanley Withington Nichols; 2,627		Merged district
Qu'Appelle-Wolseley	Frederick Middleton Dundas; 4,130	John H. Sturdy; 1,932	Stanley Withington Nichols; 2,627		William George Bennett**; Wolseley
Touchwood	**John M. Parker**; 3,380	Edward Hamilton; 2,273	Caleb H. Fisher; 518	William J. Burak (Ind.) 1,845	John Mason Parker
Yorkton	Vincent R. Smith; 3,343	Llewellyn C. Fletcher; 992	Alan C. Stewart; 2,661		Alan Carl Stewart

December 9, 1935 By-Election: Melville
Party	Candidate	Votes	%	±%
Liberal	E. Walt Gerrand	Acclaimed	100.00%	
Total		Acclamation		

=== Southwest Saskatchewan ===
Electoral District	Candidates				Incumbent
Electoral District	Liberal	Farmer-Labour Group	Conservative	Other	Incumbent
Gravelbourg	Benjamin F. McGregor; 3,177	Richard Pennington Sinkinson; 1,065	Henry J. Coutu; 1,642		Benjamin Franklin McGregor
Gull Lake	Sydney J. Smith; 2,153	H. Henry Kemper; 2,404	John Frederick Frook; 1,725		New District
Maple Creek	John Mildenberger; 3,114	Jacob J. Hubenig; 1,140	James McDougald; 1,784		George Spence
Moose Jaw County	Thomas Waddell; 2,500	Henry Milne; 1,714		Sinclair Whittaker (Ind.) 1,075	Sinclair Alexander Whittaker
Morse	Neil J. MacDonald; 2,717	John McCaig; 1,430	Richard P. Eades; 1,752		Richard Percy Eades
Notukeu	George Spence; 2,196	Con. Rieder; 1,499	P.M. McKinnon; 1,560		Alexander Lothian Grant**
Shaunavon	Harry Ostlund; 1,911	Clarence Stork; 2,061	John Gryde; 1,470		John Edward Gryde
Swift Current	Jim Taggart; 2,531	Allan McCallum; 2,339	W.W. Smith; 2,337		William Wensley Smith
Willow Bunch	Charles W. Johnson; 2,448	Charles M. Wilkin Emery; 1,219	Edgar Burton Linnell; 1,445		Charles William Johnson

November 26, 1935 By-Election: Gravelbourg
Party	Candidate	Votes	%	±%
Liberal	Edward Culliton	3,312	68.90%	+14.91%
Farmer–Labour	Frank Keem Malcolm	1,495	31.10%	+13.00%
Total		4,807	100.00%	

=== Southeast Saskatchewan ===
Electoral District	Candidates				Incumbent
Electoral District	Liberal	Farmer-Labour Group	Conservative	Other	Incumbent
Bromhead	Norman L. McLeod; 2,416	Eric Oxelgren; 1,208	Francis Burden Smyth; 1,111		David McKnight**
Bengough	James Bidwell Smith; 2,122	William F. Jordan; 1,257	Herman Kersler Warren; 2,052		Herman Kersler Warren
Cannington	**William J. Patterson**; 4,222	Donald K. Cameron; 2,152	Samson Wallace Arthur; 2,075		Samson Wallace Arthur
Francis	Charles M. Dunn; 2,504	Robert E. Juby; 1,085	Samuel Norval Horner; 1,896		Samuel Norval Horner
Milestone	William Pedersen; 1,991	E. Blaine Moats; 1,108	Joseph V. Patterson; 1,365		Joseph Victor Patterson
Moosomin	Arthur T. Procter; 2,812	John F. Herman; 1,025	Frederick D. Munroe; 2,465		Frederick Dennis Munroe
Souris-Estevan	Jesse P. Tripp; 3,536	Herbert G. Gallaway; 1,215	William O. Fraser; 2,960		William Oliver Fraser; Souris
Souris-Estevan	Jesse P. Tripp; 3,536	Herbert G. Gallaway; 1,215	William O. Fraser; 2,960		Merged district
Souris-Estevan	Jesse P. Tripp; 3,536	Herbert G. Gallaway; 1,215	William O. Fraser; 2,960		Vacant; Estevan
Weyburn	Hugh E. Eaglesham; 2,281	Tommy Douglas; 1,343	**Robert S. Leslie**; 1,544	James L. Coltart (Ind.) 29	Robert Sterritt Leslie

=== Urban constituencies ===
Electoral District	Candidates				Incumbent
Electoral District	Liberal	Farmer-Labour Group	Conservative	Other	Incumbent
Moose Jaw City	William Gladstone Ross; 4,928 John Houston Laird; 4,403	Waldo D. Summers; 2,013 Hugh Gordon; 1,765	John Alexander Merkley; 2,440 James W. Hawthorne; 2,319	William George Baker (Labour) 1,420	John Alexander Merkley Robert Henry Smith**
Saskatoon City	James Wilfred Estey; 9,168 George Wesley Norman; 8,670	Gladys Isabel Salisbury; 3,098 John Johnson Egge; 2,797	James T.M. Anderson; 7,511 Howard McConnell; 6,797	William Taylor (United Front) 353	James T.M. Anderson Howard McConnell
Regina City	Percy McCuaig Anderson; 11,564 William Franklin Kerr; 11,512	Major J. Coldwell; 6,714 Garnet Nelson Menzies; 4,954	M. A. MacPherson; 9,082 James Grassick; 7,857	William Stokes (United Front) 232	Murdoch Alexander MacPherson James Grassick

December 2, 1935 By-Election: Regina City (1 member elected)
Party	Candidate	Votes	%	±%
Liberal	William Franklin Kerr (incumbent)	11,883	65.58%	–
Independent	Denis Sweeney	6,236	34.42%	–
Total		18,119	100.00%	

== See also ==
- List of political parties in Saskatchewan
- List of Saskatchewan provincial electoral districts
