= 1929 Saskatchewan general election =

Canadian provincial election

← 1925	June 6, 1929	1934 →

63 seats in the Legislative Assembly of Saskatchewan 32 seats needed for a majority
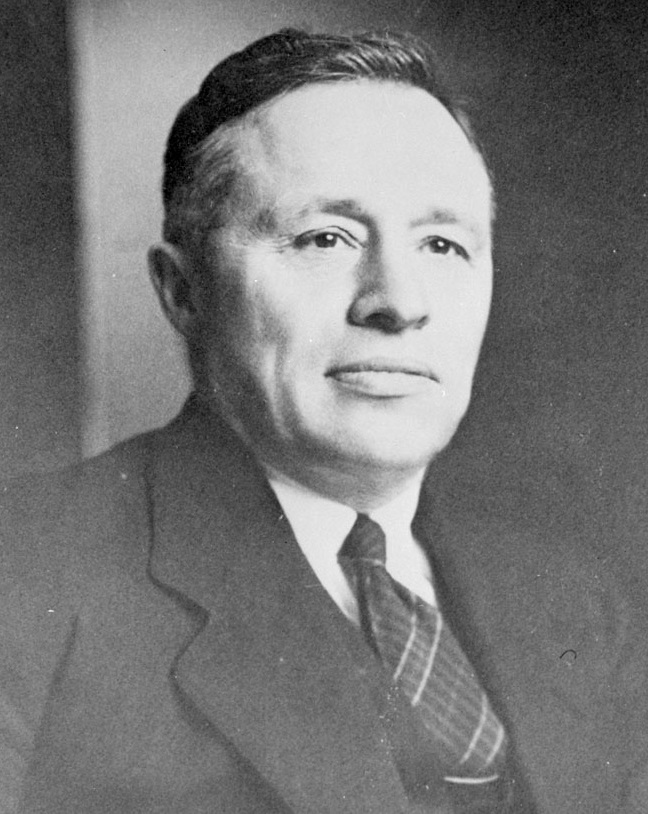

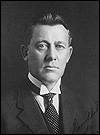
	First party	Second party	Third party
			PRO
Leader	James Gardiner	James Anderson	—
Party	Liberal	Conservative	Progressive
Leader since	February 25, 1926	March 25, 1924	—
Leader's seat	North Qu'Appelle	Saskatoon City	—
Last election	50	3	6
Seats won	28	24	5
Seat change	▼22	▲21	▼1
Popular vote	164,487	131,550	24,988
Percentage	45.6%	36.4%	6.9%
Swing	▼6.0pp	▲18.1pp	▼16.1pp
Premier before election
James Gardiner
Liberal
Premier after election
James Anderson
Conservative

The 1929 Saskatchewan general election was held on June 6, 1929 to elect members of the Legislative Assembly of Saskatchewan.

As a result of corruption scandals, the Liberal Party of Premier James Gardiner lost a significant share of its popular vote, but more important, lost twenty-two of the seats it had won in the 1925 election. While the Liberals held the largest number of seats in the legislature, they had only a minority. Gardiner tried to continue as a minority government, but was quickly defeated in a Motion of No Confidence, and resigned as premier.

The Conservative Party of James T.M. Anderson increased its representation in the legislature from three to twenty four seats. Following Gardiner's resignation, Anderson was able to form a coalition government with the support of the Progressive Party and some independents.

The Progressives had lost a large part of the popular vote it had won in 1925, but managed to retain five of the six seats it had won previously.

== Results ==
Party	Party Leader	# of candidates	Seats			Popular Vote		
Party	Party Leader	# of candidates	1925	Elected	% Change	Votes	%	% Change
Liberal	James Gardiner	62	50	28	-44%	164,487	45.56%	-5.95%
Conservative	James Anderson	40	3	24	+700%	131,550	36.44%	+18.09%
Independent		17	2	6	+200%	32,729	9.06%	+5.55%
Progressive		16	6	5	-18.3%	24,988	6.92%	-16.12%
Liberal-Labour		1	*	–	*	4,181	1.16%	
Economic Group		3	*	–	*	1,942	0.54%	*
Independent Liberal		1	1	–	-100%	1,160	0.32%	-0.75%
Total		140	63	63	–	361,037	100%	
Source: Elections Saskatchewan

Note: * Party did not nominate candidates in previous election.

=== Percentages ===
Popular vote
Liberal	45.56%
Conservative	36.44%
Progressive	6.92%
Others	11.08%

Seats summary
Liberal	44.44%
Conservative	38.10%
Progressive	7.94%
Others	9.52%

== Members elected ==
For complete electoral history, see individual districts

7th Saskatchewan Legislative Assembly
District	Member	Party
Arm River	Duncan Hutcheon	Conservative
Bengough	Herman Warren	Conservative
Biggar	William Miller	Conservative
Cannington	Samson Arthur	Independent
Canora	Anton Morken	Liberal
Cut Knife	George McLean	Independent
Cypress	John Gryde	Conservative
Elrose	James Cobban	Conservative
Estevan	Eleazer Garner	Liberal
Francis	Samuel Horner	Progressive
Gravelbourg	Benjamin McGregor	Liberal
Hanley	Reginald Stipe	Progressive
Happyland	Donald Strath	Liberal
Humboldt	Henry Therres	Liberal
Jack Fish Lake	Donald Finlayson	Liberal
Kerrobert	Robert Hanbidge	Conservative
Kindersley	Ebenezer Whatley	Progressive
Kinistino	Charles McIntosh	Liberal
Last Mountain	Jacob Benson	Progressive
Lloydminster	Robert J. Gordon	Liberal
Lumsden	James Bryant	Conservative
Maple Creek	George Spence	Liberal
Melfort	Rupert Greaves	Conservative
Milestone	Joseph Patterson	Independent
Moose Jaw City #1	John Merkley	Conservative
Moose Jaw City #2	Robert Henry Smith	Conservative
Moose Jaw County	Sinclair Whittaker	Conservative
Moosomin	Frederick Munroe	Conservative
Morse	Richard Eades	Conservative
North Qu'Appelle	James Garfield Gardiner	Liberal
Notukeu	Alexander Grant	Liberal
Pelly	Reginald Parker	Liberal
Pheasant Hills	Charles Dunn	Liberal
Pipestone	William John Patterson	Liberal
Prince Albert	Thomas Clayton Davis	Liberal
Redberry	George Cockburn	Liberal
Regina City #1	Murdoch MacPherson	Conservative
Regina City #2	James Grassick	Conservative
Rosetown	Nathaniel Given	Conservative
Rosthern	John Uhrich	Liberal
Saltcoats	Asmundur Loptson	Liberal
Saskatoon City #1	James Anderson	Conservative
Saskatoon City #2	Howard McConnell	Conservative
Saskatoon County	Charles Agar	Liberal
Shellbrook	Edgar Clinch	Liberal
Souris	William Oliver Fraser	Conservative
South Qu'Appelle	Anton Huck	Liberal
Swift Current	William Wensley Smith	Conservative
The Battlefords	Samuel Huston	Independent
Thunder Creek	Harold Lilly	Conservative
Tisdale	Walter Buckle	Conservative
Touchwood	John M. Parker	Liberal
Turtleford	Charles Ayre	Liberal
Vonda	James Hogan	Liberal
Wadena	John Robeson Taylor	Independent
Weyburn	Robert Leslie	Progressive
Wilkie	Alexander John McLeod	Conservative
Willow Bunch	Charles William Johnson	Liberal
Wolseley	William George Bennett	Conservative
Wynyard	Wilhelm Paulson	Liberal
Yorkton	Alan Carl Stewart	Independent

=== July 16, 1929 ===
District	Member	Party
Cumberland	Deakin Alexander Hall	Liberal

=== August 12, 1929 ===
District	Member	Party
Île-à-la-Crosse	Jules Marion	Liberal

== See also ==
- Ku Klux Klan in Canada
- List of political parties in Saskatchewan
- List of Saskatchewan provincial electoral districts
