= 1938 Saskatchewan general election =

Canadian provincial election

- June 8, 1938

52 seats in the Legislative Assembly of Saskatchewan 27 seats needed for a majority

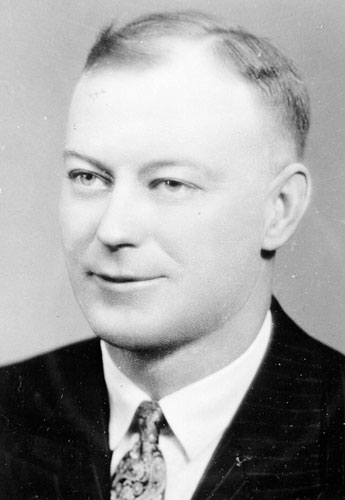

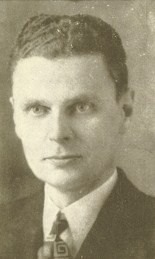
	First party	Second party	Third party
			SC
Leader	William John Patterson	George Hara Williams	Joseph Needham
Party	Liberal	Co-operative Commonwealth	Social Credit
Leader since	1935	July 17, 1936	1935
Leader's seat	Cannington	Wadena	Did not run
Last election	50	5	pre-creation
Seats won	38	10	2
Seat change	▼12	▲5	▲2
Popular vote	200,334	82,529	70,084
Percentage	45.45%	18.73%	15.90%
Swing	▼2.55pp	▼5.26pp	▲15.90pp
	Fourth party	Fifth party
	Unity
Leader	—	John Diefenbaker
Party	Unity	Conservative
Leader since	—	October 28, 1936
Leader's seat	—	Ran in Arm River (lost)
Last election	0	0
Seats won	2	0
Seat change	▲2	±0
Popular vote	9,848	52,315
Percentage	2.24%	11.87%
Swing	▲2.00pp	▼14.88pp
Premier before election
William John Patterson
Liberal
Premier after election
William John Patterson
Liberal

The 1938 Saskatchewan general election was held on June 8, 1938, to elect members of the Legislative Assembly of Saskatchewan.

The Liberal Party was returned to power under its new leader, William John Patterson, but it lost twelve of the seats it had held in the previous legislature. The Liberals faced several new forces in this election.

Six "Unity" candidates also ran in an attempt to create a popular front of the Communists, CCF supporters and various populists. Although two were elected, they received only a very small fraction of the overall vote.

== Results ==
Party	Party leader	Candidates	Seats				Popular vote		
Party	Party leader	Candidates	1934	Dissol.	Elected	% Change	#	%	% Change
Liberal	William Patterson	53	50	50	38	-24%	200,334	45.45%	-2.55%
Co-operative Commonwealth	George Williams	31	5	5	10	+100%	82,529	18.73%	-5.26%
Social Credit	Joseph Needham (default)	40	*	–	2	*	70,084	15.90%	*
Unity		3	–	–	2	–	9,848	2.24%	+2.00%
Conservative	John Diefenbaker	24	–	–	–	–	52,315	11.87%	-14.88%
Independent Labour		3	*	–	–	*	12,039	2.73%	+2.40%
Labour Progressive		2	*	–	–	*	8,514	1.93%	*
Independent		2	–	–	–	–	4,023	0.91%	+0.22%
Independent Conservative		1	*	–	–	*	828	0.19%	*
Independent Social Credit		1	*	–	–	*	228	0.05%	*
Total		160	55	55	52	-5.5%	440,742	100%	
Source: Elections Saskatchewan

Note: * Party did not nominate candidates in previous election.

=== Percentages ===
Popular vote
Liberal	45.45%
CCF	18.73%
Social Credit	15.90%
Conservative	11.87%
Unity	2.24%
Others	5.81%

Seats summary
Liberal	73.08%
CCF	19.23%
Social Credit	3.85%
Unity	3.85%

=== Ranking ===
Party	Seats	Second	Third	Fourth
Liberal	38	15	0	0
Co-operative Commonwealth	10	13	6	2
Social Credit	2	13	18	7
Unity	2	0	1	0
Conservative	0	9	9	6
Other parties	0	2	7	0

== Riding results ==
Names in bold represent cabinet ministers and the Speaker. Party leaders are italicized. The symbol " ** " indicates MLAs who are not running again.

=== Northwestern Saskatchewan ===
Electoral District	Candidates					Incumbent
Electoral District	Liberal	Co-operative Commonwealth Federation	Social Credit	Conservative	Other	Incumbent
Athabasca	Jules Marion; 642				William J. Windrum (Liberal) 628	Deakin Alexander Hall
Cut Knife	John A. Gordon; 2,379	Andrew Macauley; 1,766	Bill Roseland; 2,471			Andrew James Macauley
Meadow Lake	Donald MacDonald; 3,184	Robert C. Paul; 1,800	Judson B. Clark; 2,434			Donald MacDonald
Redberry	Orest Zerebko; 2,601		Sheridan P. Porter; 1,824		Arnold Larsen (Ind.) 1,572	New District
Rosthern	John Uhrich; 3,267		H. Henry Henschel; 1,735		Peter Peters (Ind. Social Credit) 228	John Michael Uhrich
Shellbrook	Omer Demers; 2,933	Albert Mansfield; 1,343	Virden Gable; 2,560			Omer Demers
The Battlefords	John Gregory; 3,119	Lloyd A. Gardiner; 1,287	Albert J. Tatchell; 2,085			John Albert Gregory
Turtleford	Bill Kerr; 2,925	John Stegehuis; 440	James Proctor; 2,759	Walter A. Hicks; 456		Charles Arthur Ayre**

June 26, 1940 By-Election: The Battlefords
Party	Candidate	Votes	%	±%
Liberal	Paul Prince	3,289	61.76%	+13.71%
CCF	Max Campbell	2,036	38.24%	+18.41%
Total		5,325	100.00%	

July 28, 1941 By-Election: Athabasca
Party	Candidate	Votes	%	±%
Liberal	Hubert Staines	Acclaimed	100.00%	
Total		Acclamation		

=== Northeastern Saskatchewan ===
Electoral District	Candidates				Incumbent
Electoral District	Liberal	Co-operative Commonwealth Federation	Social Credit	Conservative	Incumbent
Cumberland	Deakin A. Hall; 548			George W. Smith; 57	New District
Humboldt	Jim King; 3,636	Joe Burton; 3,446	John J. Lins; 385		James Chisholm King
Kelvington	James Marshall; 2,747	Peter Howe; 4,174			George Ernest Dragan
Kinistino	John Taylor; 2,866	William J. Boyle; 1,864	William H. Setka; 1,482	Andrew Fraser; 560	John Richard Parish Taylor
Melfort	John MacFarlane; 2,657	Oakland Woods Valleau; 3,024	Chrysostom J. Lewis; 1,029	Gilbert D. Eamer; 1,604	John Duncan MacFarlane
Prince Albert	Thomas Davis; 5,279	John J.F. McIsaac; 970	George Bzowey; 2,342	Kennedy H. Palmer; 2,227	Thomas Clayton Davis
Tisdale	Harvie Dorrance; 3,421	John Hewgill Brockelbank; 4,202	Robert M. Locker; 1,115	Garth F. Johnston; 654	Harvie James Dorrance
Torch River	Jim Kiteley; 1,992	Harry Fenster; 1,354	Herve Prince; 1,025	Conrad B. Euler; 366	New District

August 4, 1938 By-Election: Humboldt
Party	Candidate	Votes	%	±%
CCF	Joe Burton	3,909	50.90%	+4.75%
Liberal	Charles Dunn	3,771	49.10%	+0.41%
Total		7,680	100.00%	

October 16, 1939 By-Election: Prince Albert
Party	Candidate	Votes	%	±%
Liberal	Harry Fraser	Acclaimed	100.00%	
Total		Acclamation		

=== West Central Saskatchewan ===
Electoral District	Candidates				Incumbent
Electoral District	Liberal	Co-operative Commonwealth Federation	Social Credit	Conservative	Incumbent
Arm River	Gustaf Herman Danielson; 3,295			John Diefenbaker; 3,105	Gustaf Herman Danielson
Biggar	Bob Hassard; 3,196	John Young; 3,341	Henry A. Gardner; 841		Robert Pelham Hassard
Hanley	**Charles Agar**; 2,774		Frederick E. Roluf; 1,599	John A. Stewart; 1,623	Charles Agar
Kerrobert-Kindersley	Donald Laing; 3,298	Frank Jaenicke; 1,201	Robert M. Goodwin; 2,336		Donald Laing; Kerrobert
Kerrobert-Kindersley	Donald Laing; 3,298	Frank Jaenicke; 1,201	Robert M. Goodwin; 2,336		Merged district
Kerrobert-Kindersley	Donald Laing; 3,298	Frank Jaenicke; 1,201	Robert M. Goodwin; 2,336		Louis Henry Hantelman; Kindersley
Rosetown	Neil McVicar; 2,449	John T. Douglas; 1,941	William J. Loucks; 1,415	Andrew Wilson; 951	Neil McVicar
Watrous	Frank S. Krenn; 3,522	John Waldbillig; 2,181	Charles A. Schmeiser; 1,609	Julius W. Stechishin; 474	Bert Clement**
Wilkie	John C. Knowles; 4,053		Frank R. Beggs; 2,797		John Jardine**

=== East Central Saskatchewan ===
Electoral District	Candidates					Incumbent
Electoral District	Liberal	Co-operative Commonwealth Federation	Social Credit	Conservative	Other	Incumbent
Canora	George Dragan; 3,259	Myron Feeley; 3,504				New District
Last Mountain	Guy H. Hummel; 3,168	Jacob Benson; 3,299	William H. Schroder; 902	Alfred J. Dyer; 1,121		Guy Hartsel Hummel
Melville	Charles Dunn; 5,089		John Herman; 5,100			E. Walt Gerrand**
Pelly	Reginald J.M. Parker; 3,936	Gertrude S. Telford; 3,088				Reginald John Marsden Parker
Saltcoats	Asmundur A. Loptson; 3,114	Joseph L. Phelps; 3,409	Alexander E. Sahlmark; 1,003			New District
Touchwood	**John Parker**; 1,910	Tom Johnston; 2,301	Hugh H. Lyle; 1,268	John Hnatyshyn; 1,287		John Mason Parker
Wadena	Donald McCallum; 3,085	George Williams; 4,871	Harry W. Arnold; 345			George Hara Williams
Yorkton	Vincent Smith; 3,274				Alan Stewart (Unity) 4,955	Vincent Reynolds Smith

=== Southwest Saskatchewan ===
Electoral District	Candidates					Incumbent
Electoral District	Liberal	Co-operative Commonwealth Federation	Social Credit	Conservative	Other	Incumbent
Elrose	George B. Weiler; 2,676	Louis H. Hantelman; 3,164	Gilbert A.W. Gessel; 1,014	Henry T. Blackwell; 360		John Andrew Wilson**
Gravelbourg	Edward Culliton; 3,683		Andrew J. Miller; 2,202			Edward Milton Culliton
Gull Lake	Harvey McMahon; 3,901	Henry Kemper; 3,732				Herman Henry Kemper
Maple Creek	John Mildenberger; 4,058		Oliver Reid; 2,136		A.J. Mercer (Unity) 1,562	John Joseph Mildenberger
Morse	Benjamin T. Hyde; 2,861	Henry P. Thiessen; 1,808	William E. Armstrong; 1,416	Cliff B. Martin; 478		Neil John MacDonald**
Notukeu-Willow Bunch	Charles W. Johnson; 3,659	John E. Lidgett; 2,859	George W.S. Eisnor; 1,100			George Spence**; Notukeu
Notukeu-Willow Bunch	Charles W. Johnson; 3,659	John E. Lidgett; 2,859	George W.S. Eisnor; 1,100			Merged district
Notukeu-Willow Bunch	Charles W. Johnson; 3,659	John E. Lidgett; 2,859	George W.S. Eisnor; 1,100			Charles William Johnson; Willow Bunch
Swift Current	Jim Taggart; 4,953	Clarence Stork; 3,584	Alfred C. Butterworth; 1,097			James Gordon Taggart

=== Southeast Saskatchewan ===
Electoral District	Candidates					Incumbent
Electoral District	Liberal	Co-operative Commonwealth Federation	Social Credit	Conservative	Other	Incumbent
Bengough	James B. Smith; 3,158				Herman K. Warren (Unity) 3,331	James Bidwell Smith
Cannington	**William Patterson**; 4,473	Gladys Strum; 3,477				William John Patterson
Lumsden	Robert S. Donaldson; 2,596	McDirmid Rankin; 1,847	Thomas Allan McInnis; 624	Claude H.J. Burrows; 1,923		Henry Phillip Mang**
Milestone	William Pedersen; 2,820		Samuel Horton; 630		Samuel Norval Horner (Ind.) 2,451	William Pedersen
Moosomin	Arthur Procter; 4,198		Joseph C. Richards; 1,400	Percy S. George; 2,528		Arthur Thomas Procter
Qu'Appelle-Wolseley	Frederick M. Dundas; 4,871		Joseph Thauberger; 1,496	Stanley W. Nichols; 3,253		Frederick Middleton Dundas
Souris-Estevan	Norman McLeod; 4,383	W. Glenroy Allen; 3,467	Ernest W. Hinkson; 441			Jesse Pichard Tripp**
Weyburn	George L. Crane; 4,744	Frederick C. Williams; 4,167			John C. Burnside (Ind. Conservative) 828	Hugh Elliott Eaglesham**

=== Urban constituencies ===
Electoral District	Candidates					Incumbent
Electoral District	Liberal	Co-operative Commonwealth Federation	Social Credit	Conservative	Other	Incumbent
Moose Jaw City	William Gladstone Ross; 4,830 William George Baker; 4,728		John Wesley Corman; 2,689 William J. Passmore; 2,465	John Alexander Merkley; 2,137 Arthur W.E. Fawkes; 2,005		William Gladstone Ross William George Baker
Saskatoon City	James Wilfred Estey; 7,213 Robert Mitford Pinder; 6,893		Jacob Klassen; 4,339 John Harrison Hilton; 4,164	James T.M. Anderson; 5,006 Stephen N. MacEachern; 4,692	Robert Hunter (Independent Labour) 4,813	James Wilfred Estey George Wesley Norman**
Regina City	Percy McCuaig Anderson; 12,749 Bamm David Hogarth; 12,641		John Harold Crawford; 966	Hugh McGillivray; 7,934 Frederick Bertram Bagshaw; 6,576	Alban Cedric Ellison (Ind. Labour) 5,329 Samuel Barrington East (Lab. Prog.) 4,426 Thomas Gerald McManus (Lab. Prog.) 4,088 Alexander Duff Connon (Ind. Labour) 1,897	Percy McCuaig Anderson William Franklin Kerr

November 24, 1938 By-Election: Regina City (1 member elected)
Party	Candidate	Votes	%	±%
Liberal	Bernard J. McDaniel (elected)	10,197	49.52%	–
Conservative	Reginald M. Balfour	5,809	28.21%	–
CCF	Charles Cromwell Williams	4,298	20.87%	–
Social Credit – Farmer-Labour	J.B. McLeod	156	0.76%	–
Social Credit	Cornelius Rink	133	0.64%	–
Total		20,593	100.00%	

== See also ==
- List of political parties in Saskatchewan
- List of Saskatchewan provincial electoral districts
