= 1925 Saskatchewan general election =

Canadian provincial election

← 1921	June 2, 1925	1929 →

63 seats in the Legislative Assembly of Saskatchewan 32 seats needed for a majority
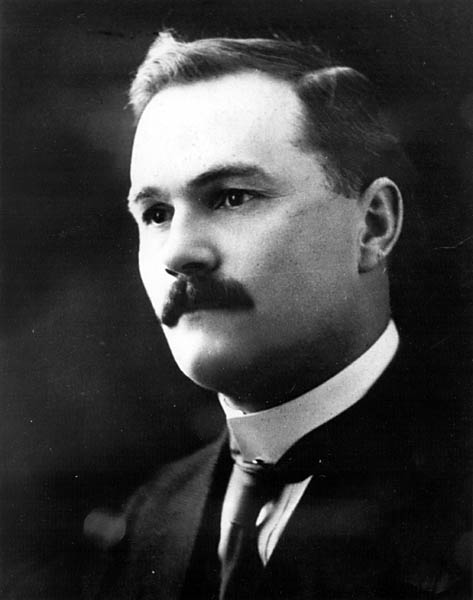

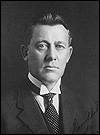
	First party	Second party	Third party
		PRO
Leader	Charles Dunning	Charles Tran	James Anderson
Party	Liberal	Progressive	Conservative
Leader since	1922	—	March 25, 1924
Leader's seat	Moose Jaw County	—	Saskatoon City
Last election	45	6	2
Seats won	50	6	3
Seat change	▲5	±0	▲1
Popular vote	127,751	57,142	45,515
Percentage	51.5%	23.0%	18.4%
Swing	▲0.1pp	▲15.5pp	▲14.4pp
Premier before election
Charles Dunning
Liberal
Premier after election
Charles Dunning
Liberal

The 1925 Saskatchewan general election was held on June 2, 1925, to elect members of the Legislative Assembly of Saskatchewan.

The Liberal Party of Saskatchewan – under its new leader, Charles A. Dunning – won its sixth consecutive victory, and continued to dominate the legislature.

The Progressive Party of Saskatchewan increased its share of the vote from 7.5% to over 23%, but failed to add to its six member caucus.

The Conservative Party of James Anderson also increased its vote by over 14%, but only increased its representation in the legislature from two to three members.

The increase in the Progressive and Conservative vote came from voters who had supported independent candidates in the 1921 election.

== Results ==
Elections to the 6th Legislative Assembly of Saskatchewan (1925)
Party	Leader	Candidates	Votes				Seats		
Party	Leader	Candidates	#	±	%	Change (pp)	1921	1925	±
Liberal	Charles Dunning	62	127,751	34,768▼	51.51	0.16	45	50 / 63	5▲
Progressive	Charles Tran	40	57,142	43,529▲	23.04	15.52	6	6 / 63	Steady
Conservative	James Anderson	18	45,515	38,382▲	18,35	14.41	2	3 / 63	1▲
Independent		6	8,703	37,853▼	3.51	-22.22	7	2 / 63	5▼
Liberal–Labour (Note: Compared to 1921 Labour totals)		1	4,704	1,330▼	1.90	-1.44	1	1 / 63	Steady
Independent Liberal		1	2,653	2,653▲	1.07	1.07	–	1 / 63	1▲
Independent Conservative		1	1,545	4,750▼	0.62	-2.86	1	0 / 63	1▼
Independent Pro-Government		Did not campaign					1	0 / 63	1▼
Total		129	248,013		100.00%				

== MLAs elected ==
Arm River: George A. Scott
Bengough: Thomas Gamble
Biggar: Robert Hassard
Cannington: Albert Steele
Canora: Joseph McClure
Cumberland: Deakin Hall
Cut Knife: William Dodds
Cypress: Henry Halvorson
Elrose: Wilbert Hagarty
Estevan: James Creighton
Francis: Walter Robinson
Gravelbourg: Benjamin McGregor
Hanley: Reginald Stipe
Happyland: John Keelan
Humboldt: Henry Therres (I-Lib)
Île-à-la-Crosse: Joseph Nolin
Jack Fish Lake: Donald Finlayson
Kerrobert: John Dowd
Kindersley: Ebenezer Whatley
Kinistino: Charles McIntosh
Last Mountain: Samuel Latta
Lloydminster: Robert J. Gordon
Lumsden: Hugh Miller
Maple Creek: Peter Hyde
Melfort: Olin Hill
Milestone: Frederick Lewis
Moose Jaw City: William George Baker (L-L)
Moose Jaw City: William Erskine Knowles
Moose Jaw County: Charles Dunning
Moosomin: John Salkeld
Morse: William MacLachlan
North Qu'Appelle: James Garfield Gardiner
Notukeu: George Spence
Pelly: Charles Tran
Pheasant Hills: James Arthur Smith
Pipestone: William John Patterson
Prince Albert: Thomas Clayton Davis
Redberry: George Cockburn
Regina City: Murdoch MacPherson
Regina City: Donald McNiven
Rosetown: John Andrew Wilson
Rosthern: John Uhrich
Saltcoats: George Sahlmark
Saskatoon City: James Anderson
Saskatoon City: Archibald Peter McNab
Saskatoon County: Charles Agar
Shellbrook: Edgar Clinch
Souris: Jesse Tripp
South Qu'Appelle: Anton Huck
Swift Current: David Sykes
The Battlefords: Allan Pickel
Thunder Creek: Robert Donaldson
Tisdale: Walter Buckle
Touchwood: John Parker
Turtleford: Archibald Gemmell
Vonda: James Hogan
Wadena: William Henry McKinnon
Weyburn: Charles Hamilton
Wilkie: Robert Nay
Willow Bunch: Abel Hindle
Wolseley: Thomas McAfee
Wynyard: Wilhelm Paulson
Yorkton: Thomas Garry

=== Single-member districts ===
Results by riding - 1925 Saskatchewan general election (single-member districts)
Riding	Winning party						Votes						
Name	1921	Party	Votes	Share	Margin #	Margin %	Lib	Prog	Con	Ind	I-Lib	I-Con	Total
Arm River	Lib	Lib	1,799	54.68%	308	9.36%	1,799	–	1,491	–	–	–	3,290
Bengough	Lib	Lib	1,813	61.65%	685	23.29%	1,813	1,128	–	–	–	–	2,941
Biggar	Prog	Lib	1,758	52.98%	198	5.97%	1,758	1,560	–	–	–	–	3,318
Cannington	Lib	Lib	1,666	63.23%	697	26.45%	1,666	–	–	969	–	–	2,635
Canora	Lib	Prog	1,993	62.50%	797	24.99%	1,196	1,993	–	–	–	–	3,189
Cumberland (Note: Election day deferred to July 21, 1925)	Lib	Lib	Acclamation										
Cut Knife	Lib	Lib	829	50.67%	22	1.34%	829	807	–	–	–	–	1,636
Cypress	Lib	Lib	1,760	77.16%	1,239	54.32%	1,760	521	–	–	–	–	2,281
Elrose	Lib	Lib	1,717	52.57%	168	5.14%	1,717	1,549	–	–	–	–	3,266
Estevan	Lib	Ind	2,153	55.91%	455	11.82%	1,698	–	–	2,153	–	–	3,851
Francis	Lib	Lib	1,641	54.05%	246	8.10%	1,641	1,395	–	–	–	–	3,036
Gravelbourg	Ind	Lib	2,832	74.59%	1,867	49.17%	2,832	965	–	–	–	–	3,797
Hanley	Lib	Prog	1,764	52.70%	181	5.41%	1,583	1,764	–	–	–	–	3,347
Happyland	Lib	Lib	2,427	52.88%	264	5.75%	2,427	–	2,163	–	–	–	4,590
Humboldt	Lib	I-Lib	2,653	62.12%	1,035	24.23%	1,618	–	–	–	2,653	–	4,271
Île-à-la-Crosse	Lib	Lib	591	61.31%	218	22.61%	591	–	–	373	–	–	964
Jack Fish Lake	Lib	Lib	1,006	63.51%	428	27.02%	1,006	578	–	–	–	–	1,584
Kerrobert	Lib	Lib	2,121	62.44%	845	24.87%	2,121	–	1,276	–	–	–	3,397
Kindersley	Prog	Prog	2,232	57.57%	587	15.14%	1,645	2,232	–	–	–	–	3,877
Kinistino	Lib	Lib	2,263	61.58%	851	23.16%	2,263	1,412	–	–	–	–	3,675
Last Mountain	Lib	Lib	2,503	55.06%	460	10.12%	2,503	–	2,043	–	–	–	4,546
Lloydminster	Lib	Lib	1,144	66.67%	572	33.33%	1,144	572	–	–	–	–	1,716
Lumsden	Lib	Lib	1,884	50.78%	58	1.56%	1,884	1,826	–	–	–	–	3,710
Maple Creek	Lib	Lib	Acclamation										
Melfort	Lib	Lib	1,469	40.51%	145	4.00%	1,469	1,324	833	–	–	–	3,626
Milestone	Lib	Lib	1,577	48.08%	714	21.77%	1,577	863	840	–	–	–	3,280
Moose Jaw County	Lib	Lib	2,094	71.49%	1,259	42.98%	2,094	835	–	–	–	–	2,929
Moosomin	Con	Ind	1,888	52.68%	192	5.36%	1,696	–	–	1,888	–	–	3,584
Morse	IPG	Lib	2,480	65.26%	1,160	30.53%	2,480	1,320	–	–	–	–	3,800
North Qu'Appelle	Lib	Lib	2,370	60.71%	836	21.41%	2,370	1,534	–	–	–	–	3,904
Notukeu	Lib	Lib	1,604	71.61%	968	43.21%	1,604	636	–	–	–	–	2,240
Pelly	Lib	Prog	1,946	53.58%	260	7.16%	1,686	1,946	–	–	–	–	3,632
Pheasant Hills	Lib	Lib	2,077	52.36%	187	4.71%	2,077	–	–	1,890	–	–	3,967
Pipestone	Lib	Lib	2,046	64.52%	921	29.04%	2,046	1,125	–	–	–	–	3,171
Prince Albert	Lib	Lib	3,164	63.50%	1,345	26.99%	3,164	1,819	–	–	–	–	4,983
Redberry	Ind	Prog	2,085	57.77%	561	15.54%	1,524	2,085	–	–	–	–	3,609
Rosetown	Lib	Lib	1,932	40.13%	359	7.46%	1,932	1,573	1,309	–	–	–	4,814
Rosthern	Lib	Lib	Acclamation										
Saltcoats	Lib	Lib	2,376	62.41%	945	24.82%	2,376	1,431	–	–	–	–	3,807
Saskatoon County	Prog	Prog	1,314	51.07%	55	2.14%	1,259	1,314	–	–	–	–	2,573
Shellbrook	Lib	Lib	2,421	54.92%	434	9.85%	2,421	1,987	–	–	–	–	4,408
Souris	Con	Lib	1,409	51.86%	101	3.72%	1,409	–	1,308	–	–	–	2,717
South Qu'Appelle	Ind	Lib	1,589	50.70%	44	1.40%	1,589	–	–	–	–	1,545	3,134
Swift Current	Ind	Lib	1,862	58.57%	545	17.14%	1,862	–	1,317	–	–	–	3,179
The Battlefords	Lib	Lib	1,694	54.23%	264	8.45%	1,694	–	–	1,430	–	–	3,124
Thunder Creek	Prog	Lib	905	38.14%	152	6.41%	905	715	753	–	–	–	2,373
Tisdale	Lib	Con	1,349	48.09%	83	2.96%	1,266	190	1,349	–	–	–	2,805
Touchwood	Lib	Lib	1,737	51.33%	90	2.66%	1,737	1,647	–	–	–	–	3,384
Turtleford	Lib	Lib	1,118	58.63%	329	17.25%	1,118	789	–	–	–	–	1,907
Vonda	Lib	Lib	2,181	65.09%	1,011	30.17%	2,181	1,170	–	–	–	–	3,351
Wadena	Prog	Lib	1,524	52.90%	167	5.80%	1,524	1,357	–	–	–	–	2,881
Weyburn	Lib	Lib	2,351	59.61%	758	19.22%	2,351	–	1,593	–	–	–	3,944
Wilkie	Prog	Lib	2,281	69.69%	1,289	39.38%	2,281	992	–	–	–	–	3,273
Willow Bunch	Lib	Lib	2,949	58.28%	838	16.56%	2,949	2,111	–	–	–	–	5,060
Wolseley	Ind	Lib	2,559	51.84%	182	3.69%	2,559	–	2,377	–	–	–	4,936
Wynyard	Ind	Lib	2,167	52.09%	174	4.18%	2,167	1,993	–	–	–	–	4,160
Yorkton	Lib	Lib	2,272	51.55%	137	3.11%	2,272	2,135	–	–	–	–	4,407

= Open seat
= winning candidate was in previous Legislature
= Incumbent had switched allegiance
= Previously incumbent in another riding
= Not incumbent; was previously elected to the Legislature
= Incumbency arose from by-election gain
= other incumbents renominated
= previously an MP in the House of Commons of Canada
= Multiple candidates

=== Multiple-member districts ===
Results by riding - 1925 Saskatchewan general election (multiple-member districts)
Riding		Winning party		Votes				
Name	MLAs	1921	1925	Lib	Prog	Con	L-Lab	Total
Moose Jaw City	2	1 1	1 1	4,095	–	2,809	4,704	14,330
Moose Jaw City	2	1 1	1 1	–	–	2,722	–	14,330
Regina City	2	2	1 1	7,889	–	7,611	–	29,649
Regina City	2	2	1 1	7,516	–	6,633	–	29,649
Saskatoon City	2	1 1	1 1	5,249	3,786	5,001	–	22,155
Saskatoon City	2	1 1	1 1	3,869	–	4,250	–	22,155

= winning candidate

== See also ==
- List of political parties in Saskatchewan
- List of Saskatchewan provincial electoral districts
