= 1921 Saskatchewan general election =

Canadian provincial election

← 1917	June 9, 1921	1925 →

63 seats in the Legislative Assembly of Saskatchewan 32 seats needed for a majority
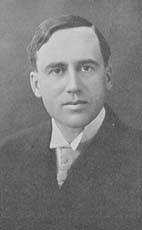
	First party	Second party	Third party
		PRO	CON
Leader	William Martin	—	—
Party	Liberal	Progressive	Conservative
Leader since	1916	—	—
Leader's seat	Regina City	—	—
Last election	51	pre-creation	7
Seats won	45	6	2
Seat change	▼6	▲6	▼5
Popular vote	92,983	13,613	7,133
Percentage	51.4%	7.5%	3.9%
Swing	▼5.3pp	▲7.5pp	▼32.4pp
Premier before election
William Martin
Liberal
Premier after election
William Martin
Liberal

The 1921 Saskatchewan general election was held on June 9, 1921, to elect members of the Legislative Assembly of Saskatchewan.

The Liberal Party of Saskatchewan of Premier William M. Martin was re-elected – although with a diminished share of the popular vote, and a reduced caucus in the legislature.

Donald McLean resigned as leader of the Conservative Party in April 1921, and the party convention decided to only form a committee to make arrangements for the coming election. There were only four candidates who were considered to have a chance of success, of which only two seats were retained. Its share of the popular vote fell from about 36% to less than 4%.

Harris Turner was instrumental in calling a meeting of Conservatives and separate school supporters to form an Independent Movement for the coming election. At a meeting held in Saskatoon in May 1921, it was decided not to establish a party structure, but to organize a central committee to field candidates. John Maharg, president of the Saskatchewan Grain Growers' Association and Minister of Agriculture in the Liberal government, would later accuse the movement of being engineered from the office of John Reid, the federal Minister of Railways. It appeared that the movement was effectively led by W.T. Badger, who was ostensibly campaigning as an Independent Conservative in Rosetown. Candidates in the movement included four Conservative, four Labour and four Non-Partisan figures.

The Independent and Independent Conservative candidates won over 29% of the vote, and voters elected a total of eight Members of the Legislative Assembly (MLAs) under these banners.

The Progressive Party of Saskatchewan made its first appearance, winning six of the seven ridings that it contested.

== Expansion of Legislative Assembly ==
An Act was passed in 1920 providing for an increase of seats from 59 to 63, upon the next election. Moose Jaw City, Regina City and Saskatoon City now returned two members, using block voting. Previously they had each elected one MLA, who had been elected using the first-past-the-post voting election system. The multi-seat districts were used until the 1960s.

The following other changes were also made:

Abolished ridings	New ridings
Renaming of districts
Moose Mountain	Wolseley
Drawn from other ridings
	Gravelbourg

== Results ==
Elections to the 5th Legislative Assembly of Saskatchewan (1921)
Party	Leader	Candidates	Votes				Seats		
Party	Leader	Candidates	#	±	%	Change (pp)	1917	1921	±
Liberal	William Martin	60	92,983	13,569▼	51.39	-5.29	51	45 / 63	6▼
Independent		35	46,556	42,116▲	25.73	23.37	1	7 / 63	6▲
Progressive		7	13,613	13,613▲	7.52	7.52	–	6 / 63	6▲
Conservative		4	7,133	61,110▼	3.94	-32.36	7	2 / 63	5▼
Independent Conservative		3	6,295	6,295▲	3.48	3.48	–	1 / 63	1▲
Labour		3	6,034	4,560▲	3.34	2.55	–	1 / 63	1▲
Independent Pro-Government		1	Acclamation				–	1 / 63	1▲
Nonpartisan League		3	3,735	3,532▼	2.06	-1.81			
Independent Labour		1	1,690	1,690▲	0.93	New			
Government		1	1,510	1,510▲	0.84	New			
Independent Non-Partisan League		1	1,400	1,400▲	0.77	New			
Total		119	180,949		100.00%				

== MLAs elected ==
Arm River: George A. Scott
Bengough: Thomas Gamble
Biggar: John Meikle
Cannington: Robert Douglas
Canora: Albert Hermanson
Cumberland: George Langley
Cut Knife: William Dodds
Cypress: Henry Halvorson
Elrose: Wilbert Hagarty
Estevan: Robert Dunbar
Francis: Walter Robinson
Gravelbourg: William Cummings
Hanley: Ernest Ketcheson
Happyland: Stephen Morrey
Humboldt: Henry Therres
Île-à-la-Crosse: Joseph Nolin
Jack Fish Lake: Donald Finlayson
Kerrobert: John Dowd
Kindersley: William Harvey
Kinistino: John R. Taylor
Last Mountain: Samuel Latta
Lloydminster: Robert J. Gordon
Lumsden: William Vancise
Maple Creek: Peter Hyde
Melfort: George B. Johnston
Milestone: Bernard Larson
Moose Jaw City: William George Baker
Moose Jaw City: James Pascoe (I-Con)
Moose Jaw County: Charles Dunning
Moosomin: John Salkeld
Morse: John Maharg (IPG)
North Qu'Appelle: James Garfield Gardiner
Notukeu: George Spence
Pelly: Sarah Ramsland
Pheasant Hills: James Arthur Smith
Pipestone: William John Patterson
Prince Albert: Charles M. McDonald
Redberry: George Cockburn
Regina City: James Albert Cross
Regina City: William Martin
Rosetown: John Andrew Wilson
Rosthern: John Uhrich
Saltcoats: George Sahlmark
Saskatoon City: Archibald Peter McNab
Saskatoon City: Harris Turner
Saskatoon County: Charles Agar
Shellbrook: Edgar Clinch
Souris: John Patrick Gordon
South Qu'Appelle: Donald H. McDonald
Swift Current: David Sykes
The Battlefords: Allan Pickel
Thunder Creek: William J. F. Warren
Tisdale: Hugh Jones
Touchwood: John M. Parker
Turtleford: Archibald Gemmell
Vonda: James Hogan
Wadena: William Henry McKinnon
Weyburn: Charles Hamilton
Wilkie: Sidney Bingham
Willow Bunch: Abel Hindle
Wolseley: William George Bennett
Wynyard: George Wilson Robertson
Yorkton: Thomas Garry

=== Single-member districts ===
Results by riding - 1921 Saskatchewan general election (single-member districts)
Riding	Winning party						Votes									
Name	1917	Party	Votes	Share	Margin #	Margin %	Lib	Ind	Prog	Con	I-Con	Lab	NPL	Govt	INP	Total
Arm River	Lib	Lib	Acclamation													
Bengough	Lib	Lib	1,595	67.67%	833	35.34%	1,595	762	–	–	–	–	–	–	–	2,357
Biggar	Lib	Prog	2,293	60.18%	776	20.37%	1,517	–	2,293	–	–	–	–	–	–	3,810
Cannington	Lib	Lib	1,606	64.65%	728	29.31%	1,606	878	–	–	–	–	–	–	–	2,484
Canora	Lib	Lib	1,597	43.55%	197	5.37%	1,597	670	–	–	–	–	–	–	1,400	3,667
Cumberland (Note: Election day deferred to August 9, 1921)	Lib	Lib	Acclamation													
Cut Knife	Lib	Lib	931	57.47%	242	14.94%	931	689	–	–	–	–	–	–	–	1,620
Cypress	Lib	Lib	Acclamation													
Elrose	Lib	Lib	1,957	52.49%	256	6.87%	1,957	1,771	–	–	–	–	–	–	–	3,728
Estevan	Lib	Lib	Acclamation													
Francis	Lib	Lib	1,456	54.25%	228	8.49%	1,456	1,228	–	–	–	–	–	–	–	2,684
Gravelbourg	New	Ind	2,582	52.77%	271	5.54%	2,311	2,582	–	–	–	–	–	–	–	4,893
Hanley	Lib	Lib	1,953	68.57%	1,058	37.15%	1,953	895	–	–	–	–	–	–	–	2,848
Happyland	Lib	Lib	2,603	77.82%	1,861	55.64%	2,603	742	–	–	–	–	–	–	–	3,345
Humboldt	Lib	Lib	Acclamation													
Île-à-la-Crosse	Lib	Lib	384	57.92%	105	15.84%	384	279	–	–	–	–	–	–	–	663
Jack Fish Lake	Lib	Lib	Acclamation													
Kerrobert	Lib	Lib	2,468	65.92%	1,192	31.84%	2,468	1,276	–	–	–	–	–	–	–	3,744
Kindersley	Lib	Prog	3,054	72.73%	1,909	45.46%	1,145	–	3,054	–	–	–	–	–	–	4,199
Kinistino	Lib	Lib	1,902	52.32%	169	4.65%	1,902	1,733	–	–	–	–	–	–	–	3,635
Last Mountain	Lib	Lib	Acclamation													
Lloydminster	Lib	Lib	Acclamation													
Lumsden	Lib	Lib	1,878	64.07%	825	28.15%	1,878	1,053	–	–	–	–	–	–	–	2,931
Maple Creek	Lib	Lib	1,910	59.89%	631	19.79%	1,910	1,279	–	–	–	–	–	–	–	3,189
Melfort	Lib	Lib	1,846	61.76%	703	23.52%	1,846	1,143	–	–	–	–	–	–	–	2,989
Milestone	Lib	Lib	Acclamation													
Moose Jaw County	Lib	Lib	Acclamation													
Moosomin	Con	Con	1,892	50.96%	71	1.91%	1,821	–	–	1,892	–	–	–	–	–	3,713
Morse	Lib	IPG	Acclamation													
North Qu'Appelle	Lib	Lib	Acclamation													
Notukeu	Lib	Lib	Acclamation													
Pelly	Lib	Lib	1,457	33.64%	419	9.67%	1,457	925	–	–	911	–	1,038	–	–	4,331
Pheasant Hills	Lib	Lib	1,590	46.27%	538	15.66%	1,590	1,846	–	–	–	–	–	–	–	3,436
Pipestone	Lib	Lib	1,624	47.95%	94	2.78%	1,624	1,763	–	–	–	–	–	–	–	3,387
Prince Albert	Lib	Lib	Acclamation													
Redberry	Lib	Ind	1,837	53.65%	250	7.30%	1,587	1,837	–	–	–	–	–	–	–	3,424
Rosetown	Con	Lib	2,735	52.65%	275	5.29%	2,735	–	–	–	2,460	–	–	–	–	5,195
Rosthern	Lib	Lib	Acclamation													
Saltcoats	Lib	Lib	Acclamation													
Saskatoon County	Lib	Prog	1,330	52.14%	109	4.27%	1,221	–	1,330	–	–	–	–	–	–	2,551
Shellbrook	Lib	Lib	1,900	59.94%	630	19.87%	1,900	1,270	–	–	–	–	–	–	–	3,170
Souris	Con	Con	1,260	50.58%	29	1.16%	1,231	–	–	1,260	–	–	–	–	–	2,491
South Qu'Appelle	Con	Ind	1,883	57.36%	483	14.71%	1,400	1,883	–	–	–	–	–	–	–	3,283
Swift Current	Ind	Ind	1,595	44.38%	85	2.37%	–	1,595	–	–	–	489	–	1,510	–	3,594
The Battlefords	Lib	Lib	Acclamation													
Thunder Creek	Con	Prog	730	51.48%	42	2.96%	–	–	730	688	–	–	–	–	–	1,418
Tisdale	Lib	Lib	1,314	54.25%	206	8.51%	1,314	1,108	–	–	–	–	–	–	–	2,422
Touchwood	Lib	Lib	1,734	58.50%	504	17.00%	1,734	–	–	–	–	–	1,230	–	–	2,964
Turtleford	Lib	Lib	1,186	52.73%	123	5.47%	1,186	1,063	–	–	–	–	–	–	–	2,249
Vonda	Lib	Lib	2,672	78.08%	1,922	56.17%	2,672	750	–	–	–	–	–	–	–	3,422
Wadena	Lib	Prog	1,979	61.50%	740	23.00%	1,239	–	1,979	–	–	–	–	–	–	3,218
Weyburn	Lib	Lib	2,368	88.39%	2,057	76.78%	2,368	311	–	–	–	–	–	–	–	2,679
Wilkie	Lib	Prog	1,694	51.51%	99	3.01%	1,595	–	1,694	–	–	–	–	–	–	3,289
Willow Bunch	Lib	Lib	3,040	54.55%	507	9.10%	3,040	–	2,533	–	–	–	–	–	–	5,573
Wolseley	Lib	Ind	2,322	54.51%	384	9.01%	1,938	2,322	–	–	–	–	–	–	–	4,260
Wynyard	Lib	Ind	2,197	59.03%	672	18.05%	1,525	2,197	–	–	–	–	–	–	–	3,722
Yorkton	Lib	Lib	2,116	59.06%	649	18.11%	2,116	–	–	–	–	–	1,467	–	–	3,583

= Open seat
= winning candidate was in previous Legislature
= Incumbent had switched allegiance
= Previously incumbent in another riding
= Not incumbent; was previously elected to the Legislature
= Incumbency arose from by-election gain
= other incumbents renominated
= previously an MP in the House of Commons of Canada
= Multiple candidates

=== Multiple-member districts ===
Results by riding - 1921 Saskatchewan general election (multiple-member districts)
Riding		Winning party		Votes							
Name	MLAs	1917	1921	Lib	Ind	Prog	Con	I-Con	Lab	I-Lab	Total
Moose Jaw City	2	1	1 1	2,921	733	–	–	2,924	3,132	–	11,851
Moose Jaw City	2	1	1 1	2,141	–	–	–	–	–	–	11,851
Regina City	2	1	2	7,540	3,500	–	–	–	2,413	–	21,206
Regina City	2	1	2	5,952	1,801	–	–	–	–	–	21,206
Saskatoon City	2	1	1 1	4,198	4,672	–	3,293	–	–	1,690	17,732
Saskatoon City	2	1	1 1	3,879	–	–	–	–	–	–	17,732

= winning candidate

== See also ==
- List of political parties in Saskatchewan
- List of Saskatchewan provincial electoral districts
