= Harris Turner =

Canadian journalist, WWI soldier and politician

Leader of the Opposition (Saskatchewan)
- In office 1924–1925
- Preceded by: John Archibald Maharg
- Succeeded by: James Thomas Milton Anderson; Charles Tran

Member of the Legislative Assembly of Saskatchewan for Active Service Voters in France and Belgium (two members)
- In office 1917–1921 Serving with Capt. Frederick Bertram Bagshaw
- Preceded by: None; new position
- Succeeded by: None; position abolished

Member of the Legislative Assembly of Saskatchewan for Saskatoon City (two members)
- In office 1921–1925 Serving with Archibald Peter McNab
- Preceded by: Donald Maclean
- Succeeded by: James Thomas Milton Anderson; Archibald Peter McNab

Member of the Saskatoon City Council
- In office 1929–1930

Personal details
- Born: October 3, 1887 Markdale, Ontario, Canada
- Died: August 12, 1972 (aged 84) Victoria, British Columbia, Canada
- Party: Provincial : Independent (1917–1925); Progressives (1925); Federal : Unionist
- Spouse: Alice M. Moyer (m. 1919)
- Children: 2
- Education: University of Toronto
- Profession: Journalist; publisher

Military service
- Allegiance: Canada
- Branch/service: Canadian Expeditionary Force
- Years of service: 1915–1917
- Rank: Private
- Unit: 1st University Company (Saskatchewan), attached to Princess Patricia's Canadian Light Infantry
- Battles/wars: Sanctuary Wood (1916)

Harris Turner (October 3, 1887 – August 12, 1972) was a Canadian journalist, soldier, publisher, and politician in Saskatchewan. In 1915, he joined the Canadian military and went overseas with the Canadian Expeditionary Force. He fought in the battle at Sanctuary Wood in 1916, where he was wounded, losing his sight.

In the 1917 Saskatchewan general election, he was elected as a member of the Legislative Assembly representing Saskatchewan soldiers on active service in France and Belgium. He was re-elected in the 1921 Saskatchewan general election, representing the Saskatoon City riding. During the legislative sessions of 1924 and 1925, he was the leader of the opposition in the Assembly, although sitting as an independent member. Defeated in the 1925 election, he sat briefly on the Saskatoon City Council (1929–1930), before retiring for health reasons.

Turner was one of the founders of the farm newspaper, The Western Producer, which is still in operation, a century later.

Turner moved to British Columbia for health reasons in 1931. He worked for ten years with the Canadian National Institute for the Blind, finally retiring in 1945.

== Early life ==
Turner was born in Markdale, Ontario on October 3, 1887, the son of Adam Turner and Mary E. Black, and was educated in Orangeville. He studied liberal arts at the University of Toronto. At some point, Turner came west and worked as a journalist in different locations, including in New Westminster, British Columbia. By 1904, he had arrived in Saskatoon and was working in a bank. In 1913, he began writing a humour column for The Daily Star, entitled "Star Beams".

== Military service ==
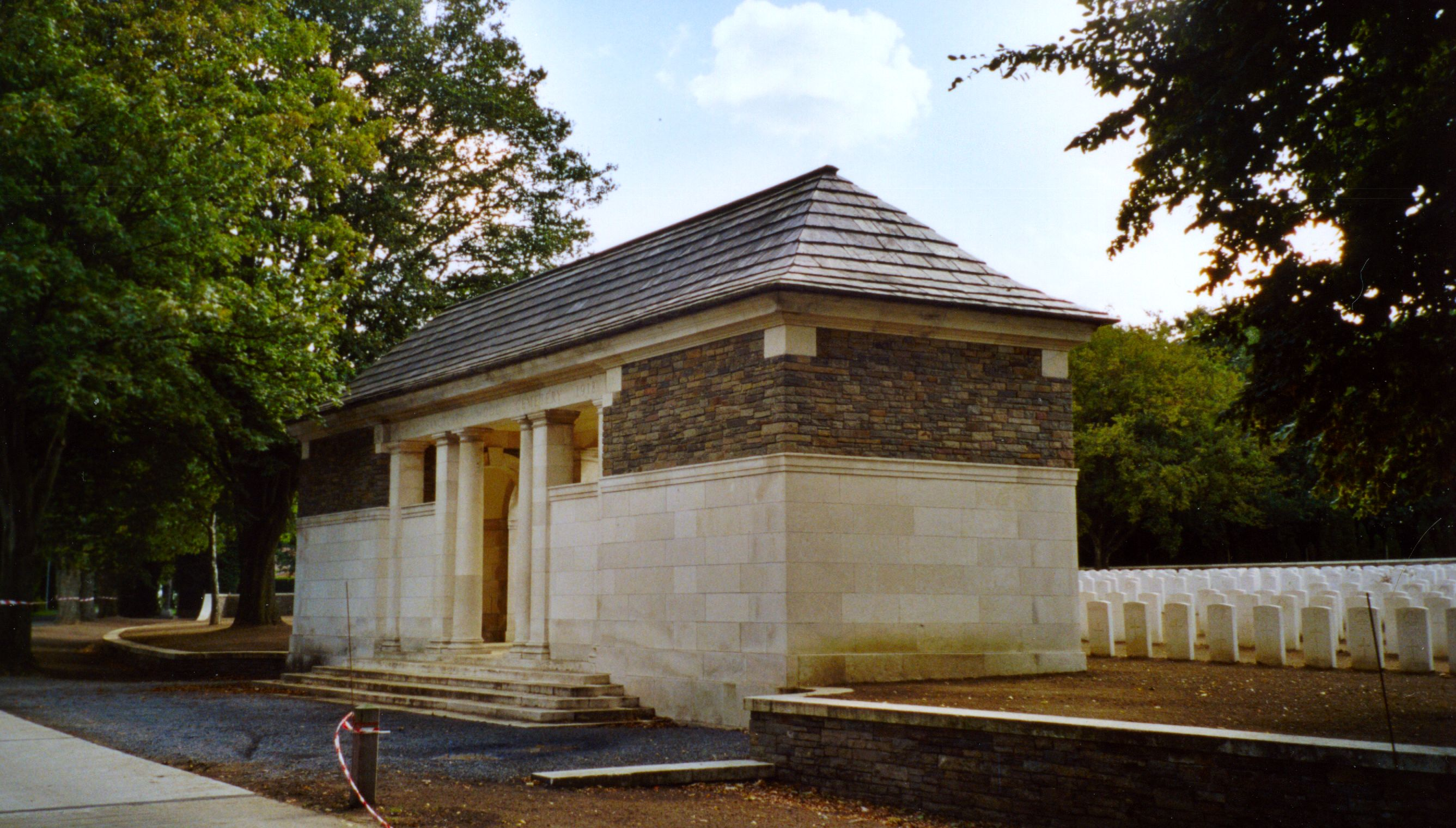
Entrance pavilion to the Sanctuary Wood Cemetery

In 1915, Turner joined the 1st University Company, Saskatchewan, which was attached to the Canadian Expeditionary Force as part of the Princess Patricia's Canadian Light Infantry. He was engaged in the battle of Sanctuary Wood in 1916, part of the Battle of Mont Sorrel along the Ypres Salient. Turner was wounded, permanently losing the sight in both eyes, an injury attributed to "shell shock".

On his return to Saskatchewan, Turner was active in the Great War Veterans Association of Canada, one of the predecessors of the Royal Canadian Legion. At a provincial meeting on November 2, 1917, he was elected as a vice-president of the Saskatchewan Provincial Command. The Association passed several resolutions, urging the provincial government to take measures to support veterans, particularly disabled veterans, and to encourage the federal government to ensure soldiers on leave in Canada returned to the battlefields.

== Family ==
Before joining the military, Turner was engaged to be married to Alice M. Moyer, daughter of a doctor in Saskatoon. After he returned to Saskatoon, Turner and Moyer married, in 1919. Alice's support was a key factor in his successes. The couple had two sons, Harris and Thomas.

== Provincial political career ==
=== Soldiers' representative ===
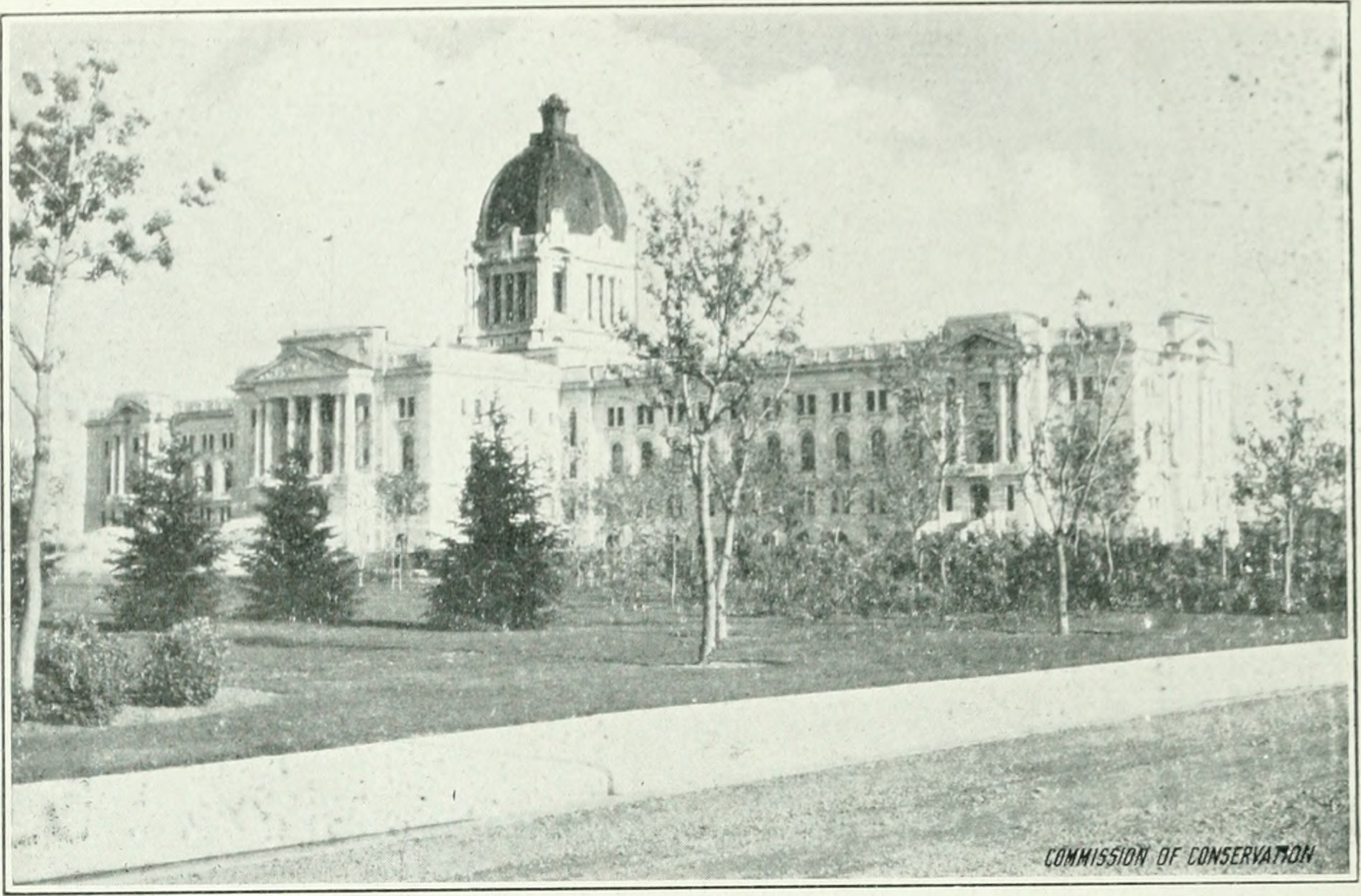
Saskatchewan Legislature building, c. 1920

In 1917, Saskatchewan held a wartime provincial election. Prior to the election, the Legislature enacted The Soldiers' Representation Act, which provided that Saskatchewan soldiers overseas would have the right to vote for their own representatives in the Legislative Assembly. Three special soldier seats were created: a single-member constituency for Saskatchewan soldiers in Britain at the time of the election, and a two-member constituency for Saskatchewan soldiers in France and Belgium. Only Saskatchewan soldiers who had served overseas were eligible to be candidates. These three seats were in addition to the normal fifty-nine seats in the Legislative Assembly.

Although he was now blind, Turner stood for election as one of the two members to be elected from the Saskatchewan soldiers in France and Belgium. He won by a resounding vote, coming in first, with almost half the total votes cast. The second member elected from France and Belgium was Captain Frederick Bagshaw, a lawyer from Regina, while Lieutenant Colonel James Albert Cross, another Regina lawyer, was elected to represent soldiers in Great Britain.

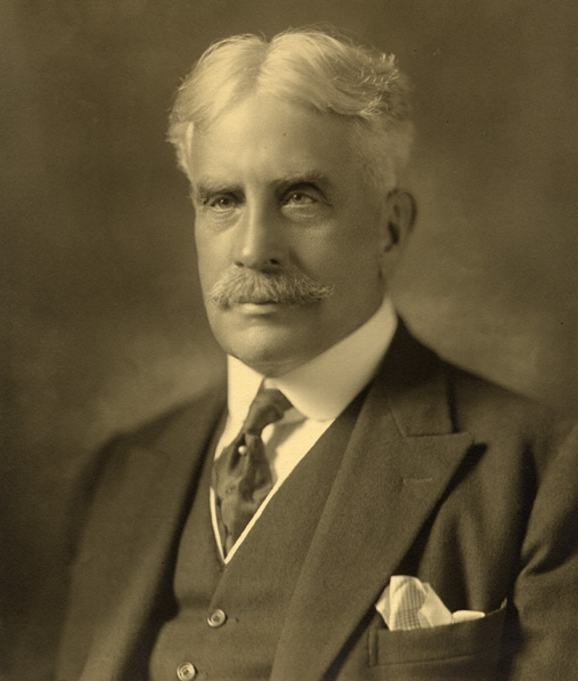
Prime Minister Borden, whom Turner supported in the conscription crisis

Turner had returned to Saskatchewan by the time of the bitterly contested federal election of 1917. Turner was active in the federal campaign, which was fought over the conscription crisis. The Unionist party, led by Prime Minister Sir Robert Borden as a coalition of the federal Conservative party and some members of the federal Liberal party, supported conscripting troops for the war effort. Another wing of the Liberal party, led by Sir Wilfrid Laurier, opposed conscription. The conscription issue split the country, with most English-Canadians supporting conscription, and most French-Canadians opposing it, particularly in Quebec. Turner campaigned throughout Saskatchewan in support of the Unionist party and conscription. In December 1917, the Unionist party won a strong majority in the federal Parliament, including sweeping all sixteen of Saskatchewan's seats, with four acclamations.

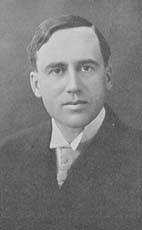
Premier Martin, who defeated Turner's motion calling for more public servants to be released for military duty

The Saskatchewan Legislature met in November 1917. Although the soldiers' vote had been held as a non-partisan vote, when Turner was introduced in the Assembly it was to cheers from the Conservative opposition, which some took as an indication that he supported that party. Turner participated in the debate on the throne speech, but his main activity in the session was to introduce a motion calling on the Liberal provincial government to release all able-bodied men in the provincial public service for military service. Premier William Martin replied that while over two hundred men in the public service had already joined the military, the government had granted exemptions from military service for a number of men deemed necessary to the public service. Martin moved an amendment to Turner's motion, approving the government's policy. The amended motion passed, with only Turner voting against it.

In 1920, the Assembly faced the issue of alcohol prohibition, which had originally been introduced during the war. The government introduced a bill which would continue prohibition, with greater restrictions on the ability of pharmacists to issue prescriptions for alcohol, along with a provision for a plebiscite on the issue. Turner spoke against the bill, arguing that it would be better to end prohibition. The bill nonetheless passed by a vote of 40 to 6, with Turner voting against the bill.

=== Re-election and opposition leader ===
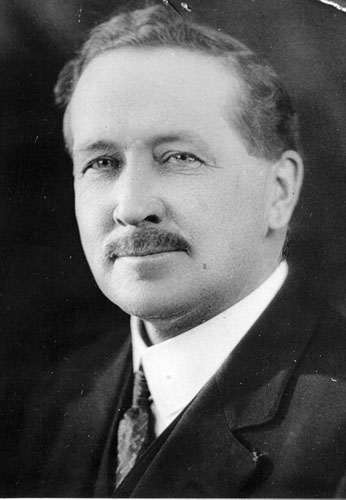
John Maharg, whom Turner succeeded as leader of the opposition

The next provincial general election was in 1921. Turner stood for re-election, this time as one of the two members from the city of Saskatoon. In preparing for the election, he was the chair of a loosely organised central committee for independent members. At an organising convention in Saskatoon prior to the election, Turner spoke against the need for a party system at all:

So far as I know, these candidates have only one thing in common and that is that they believe that the time has come when party government is no longer necessary in this province. They hold that the men or women sitting in the legislature should have only one interest before them and that is the best interest of the province as a whole; they cannot see why it should be necessary for a candidate to recognize a duty to a party as well as to his province. They believe that the time has come when the party system is a detriment to good government, if it were ever anything else.

The 1921 election had one of the most confusing set of party labels in the province's history. The Liberals had sixty candidates, for an Assembly with sixty-three seats. There were fifty-nine other candidates representing a variety of positions: thirty-five Independents, seven Progressives, four Conservatives, three Independent Conservatives, three Labour, three Nonpartisan, one Independent Labour, one Government, one Independent Nonpartisan, and one Independent Pro-government. It is not clear how many of the Independent candidates were affiliated to some degree with the co-ordinating committee chaired by Turner.

In the Saskatoon City riding, Turner again topped the poll, coming in first of the five candidates, with 26% of the total votes cast. However, the Liberals won a landslide overall, taking forty-six of the sixty-three seats in the Assembly. The remaining seats were divided between seven Independents (including Turner), six Progressives, two Conservatives, one Independent Conservative, and one Independent Pro-Government. Because they disavowed the concept of party politics, the Independents and Progressives had no party leaders. That meant there was initially no leader of the opposition for the sessions of 1921 and 1922. However, by 1924 Turner was the leader of the opposition, the result of a complicated political falling-out between Premier Martin and the Minister of Agriculture, John Maharg.

Maharg had been a Progressive member in the federal House of Commons. In the run-up to the 1921 Saskatchewan election, Premier Martin recruited him to provincial politics, bringing with him his strong farm support. Maharg did not run as a Liberal in the provincial election, but rather as the sole Independent Pro-Government candidate. Following the election, Martin appointed Maharg as Minister of Agriculture, with a seat in the Cabinet. It was a short-lived arrangement, because in the fall of 1921, Premier Martin supported a Liberal candidate in the federal election, and criticised the policies of the federal Progressives. Angered by Martin's position, Maharg resigned from Cabinet in December 1921, and crossed the floor. In 1923, he became the leader of the opposition.

Speaking in the Assembly, Turner argued that the episode showed the need for the complete abolition of the party system. He suggested that the entire principle of confidence votes should be eliminated and that each member should have complete freedom to bring matters forward in the Assembly.

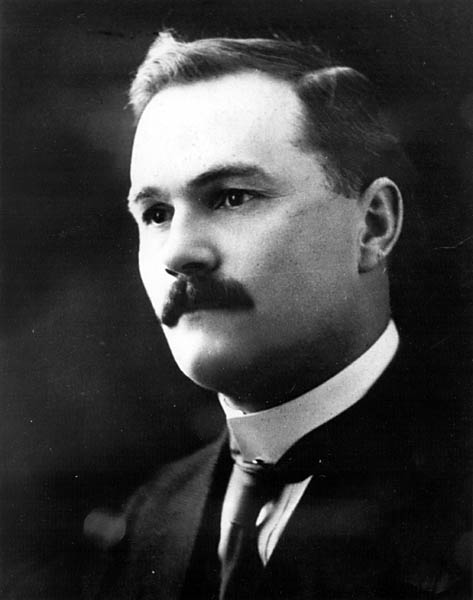
Premier Dunning, Martin's successor, whom Turner described as the spokesperson for a "menacing machine"

The episode had ongoing ramifications, resulting in Martin's resignation as premier in 1922, to be replaced as Liberal leader and premier by Charles Dunning. Speaking at a political meeting in 1923, Turner again stated that the episode showed the major defects in the party system. He acknowledged that Dunning was an admirable man, but stated that every time Dunning rose to speak in the Assembly, one could "visualize behind him the cogs, wheels, pistons and pinions of a menacing machine".

The Martin-Maharg episode continued to reverberate in Saskatchewan politics. In 1923, Maharg in turn left politics and resigned his position as leader of the opposition. In this unusual political situation, there was no clear party leader to be the leader of the opposition. The members of the opposition unanimously chose Turner to be the leader of the opposition, accepting his condition that he would only be the opposition house leader, not the leader of the opposition members as a group. He served in that position for the sessions in 1924 and 1925, until the Assembly was dissolved for the next general election in 1925.

In the session of the Assembly held in the fall of 1924, the government introduced new amendments to expand access to liquor, following the plebiscite which had favoured reduction in prohibition. Turner spoke against the bill, stating that it still was based on the policy which had caused prohibition in the first place. He argued that beer, at least, should be readily available in licensed premises, but was unsuccessful in seeking changes to the bill.

Overall, Turner appeared to have been the strongest critic of the Liberal government during the last two years before the 1925 election.

=== Progressive Party and the 1925 election ===
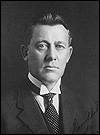
James Thomas Milton Anderson, the Conservative candidate who defeated Turner in the 1925 election

The Martin-Maharg split had created a break in farm support for the Liberal government. The result was the creation of the Progressive Party of Saskatchewan, in time for the 1925 general election. In spite of his personal distrust of the party system, Turner participated in the formation of the new party, and when he stood for election again in 1925, it was as a member of the Progressive Party. One of his campaign planks was against the Liberal party "machine", arguing that it was wrong that civil servants had to belong to the Liberal party, and that those seeking government contracts had to be Liberal supporters. He also denied suggestions from the Liberals that the Progressives had reached an agreement with the Conservatives not to nominate candidates in certain ridings, to avoid three-cornered contests between the Liberals, the Progressives, and the Conservatives.

Again campaigning in Saskatoon in a field of five candidates for two seats, this time he came in last, only earning 17% of the vote. Five of his fellow Independents in the Assembly were also defeated, likely a symptom of the lack of a strong party organisation. His successor in the Assembly was James Anderson, who went on to become premier of the province in 1929.

== Co-founder of The Western Producer ==
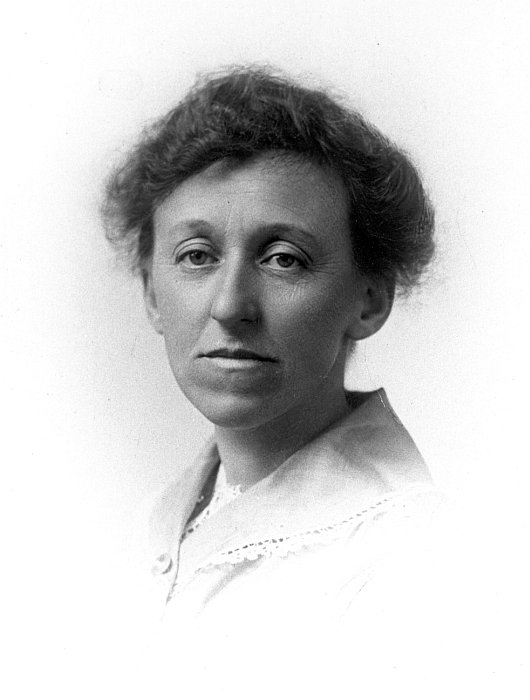
Violet McNaughton, farm and feminist activist, who gave significant editorial direction to the early editions of The Western Producer

In 1918, Turner and another returned veteran, A.P. "Pat" Waldron, had joined forces to begin a newspaper, Turner's Weekly. Subsequently described as "lively but short-lived", it addressed issues of interest to war veterans. The paper was initially successful, with a print run of 6,000, but it folded after a few years. Turner and Waldron then began a new paper with a different approach, focussing on farm issues. The new paper was first issued in 1923 under the name The Progressive, and strongly supported the wheat pool movement. In turn, the paper got significant support from farm organisations, including financial support from the Saskatchewan Grain Growers' Association, which strongly favoured wheat pools.

When the Saskatchewan Wheat Pool was established in 1924, Turner and Waldron renamed the paper The Western Producer. In 1925, they hired Violet McNaughton, one of the best known women farm activists in Saskatchewan, as the first woman editor. She was a strong advocate for wheat pools, and was involved in the internal politics of the Saskatchewan Grain Growers Association, as part of a "ginger group" which successfully forced Maharg out of his leadership position with the Association. McNaughton had significant influence in the editorial direction of the new paper, particularly through weekly columns addressing issues of interest to farm women.

Turner sold the paper to the Saskatchewan Wheat Pool in 1931, when he retired due to health concerns and the paper was experiencing financial difficulties during the Great Depression. The paper is still in business as of 2024, in both print and online versions.

== Saskatoon municipal politics ==
Turner was elected by acclamation to the Saskatoon City Council in a by-election in 1929, to fill a vacancy on city council. He was re-elected in the regular election for the 1930–1931 term. He again topped the poll, this time in a field of ten candidates for five positions on council. One of the candidates he defeated was a rising young lawyer, Emmett Hall, who later became a judge of the Supreme Court of Canada. However, Turner was experiencing health issues. In April 1930, the council granted him a leave of absence for three months. He was granted another three-month leave in July, but finally had to resign his seat for health reasons in October 1930.

== Later life and death ==
After resigning from Saskatoon City Council due to ill health, Turner and his family moved to Vancouver, British Columbia, where he worked for ten years for the Canadian National Institute for the Blind. He retired in 1945, and moved to Victoria, British Columbia. He made headlines in 1947 when he participated in a golf tournament for the blind at Toronto.

Turner continued to write freelance, and had a regular column in The Western Producer, called "Southeast Corner", until the late 1950s. In 1969, the Star-Phoenix erroneously reported that he had died, based on a tip from a family friend, but he in fact lived for three more years. He died on August 12, 1972, at the Veterans' Hospital in Victoria.

== Provincial electoral record ==
=== 1917 General election ===
1917 Saskatchewan general election: Active Service Voters – Belgium and France – October 3–13, 1917
Candidate	Popular vote	%
Pte. Harris Turner E	3,938	42.46%
Capt. Frederick Bertram Bagshaw E	1,791	19.31%
Lt. Col. Alexander Ross	978	10.54%
Pte. Kenneth Branaman Crawford	798	8.60%
Sgt. William Elijah Reade	577	6.22%
Spr. John Arthur Gibson	379	4.09%
Major Robert Henry Smith	365	3.94%
Sgt. Major William Harry Wilson	233	2.51%
Lt. Alfred William Haigh	216	2.33%
Total	9,275	100.00%
Source: Saskatchewan Archives

E Elected.

=== 1921 General election: Saskatoon City ===
Saskatchewan general election, June 9, 1921: Saskatoon City (two members)
Party	Candidate	Popular vote	%
Independent	Harris Turner E X	4,672	26.35%
Liberal	Archibald Peter McNab E X	4,198	23.67%
Liberal	John Alexander Valens	3,879	21.88%
Conservative	George Arthur Cruise	3,293	18.57%
Independent Labour	Alexander Melville Eddy	1,690	9.53%
Total		17,732	100.00%
Source: Saskatchewan Archives

E Elected
X Incumbent

=== 1925 general election: Saskatoon City ===
Saskatchewan general election, June 2, 1925: Saskatoon City (two members)
Party	Candidate	Popular vote	%
Liberal	Archibald Peter McNab E X	5,249	23.69%
Conservative	James T. M. Anderson E	5,001	22.57%
Conservative	George Arthur Cruise	4,250	19.18%
Liberal	Gilbert Harrison Yule	3,869	17.46%
Progressive	Harris Turner X	3,786	17.09%
Total		22,155	99.99%^{1}
Source: Saskatchewan Archives

E Elected
X Incumbent
^{1} Rounding error.

== Saskatoon municipal electoral record ==
=== 1929 By-election ===
Turner stood for election in a by-election in 1929 to fill a vacancy on the city council. He was elected by acclamation.

=== 1929 General election ===
1929 Saskatoon city council elections
Candidate	Popular vote	%
Harris Turner E	4,571	17.39%
W.A. Carrothers E	3,826	14.56%
Robert Mitford Pinder E	3,233	12.30%
John McDougall E	3,159	12.02%
John Sproule Mills E	3,084	11.73%
C.A. Needham	2,904	11.05%
J.J. McGrath	1,774	6.75%
F.E. Guppy	1,518	5.78%
Emmett Hall	1,476	5.62%
Robert Battersby	736	2.80%
Total	26,281	100.00%
Source: Saskatoon City Archives

E Elected
