= Gladys Strum =

Canadian politician

Gladys Grace Mae Strum
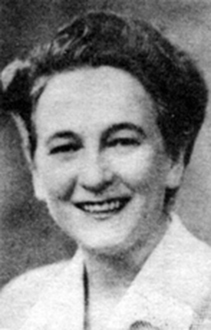

Member of the Canadian Parliament for Qu'Appelle
- In office 1945–1949
- Preceded by: Ernest Perley
- Succeeded by: Austin Edwin Dewar

Member of the Legislative Assembly of Saskatchewan for Saskatoon City
- In office 1960–1964

Personal details
- Born: February 4, 1906 Gladstone, Manitoba
- Died: August 15, 2005 (aged 99) Penticton, British Columbia
- Party: CCF
- Other political affiliations: Saskatchewan New Democratic Party
- Spouse: Warner Strum

Gladys Grace Mae Strum (February 4, 1906 – August 15, 2005) was a Canadian politician.

== Early life ==
Born in Gladstone, Manitoba, she moved to Saskatchewan when she was 16 to teach.

== Career ==
She ran unsuccessfully for a seat in the Legislative Assembly of Saskatchewan in 1938 and again in 1944. In 1944, she became president of the Saskatchewan Co-operative Commonwealth Federation (CCF), the first woman to occupy the position for a provincial party in Canada. She was elected to the House of Commons of Canada in 1945 for the riding of Qu'Appelle. She was only the fifth woman ever elected to the House of Commons and the only woman in the 20th Canadian parliament. She was defeated in 1949 and 1953.

In 1960, she was elected Saskatoon's first woman in the Saskatchewan legislature.

Gladys was a fierce proponent for Canada taking in more European refugees affected by World War II, especially children. She would often state these views during meetings in the House of Commons, and publicly denounced the significantly lower number of refugees Canada housed in comparison to Great Britain, who faced more grievances than Canada did during the war.

== Personal life ==
Gladys married school board chairman Warner Strum in 1929 at Vanguard, Saskatchewan. She was a mother to 11 children. She had only one biological child, Carol Elaine, who by 1947 was an undergraduate in architecture at the Manitoba University. The other ten children, two from Spain and eight from Czechoslovakia, were all refugees adopted through the USC Canada (now SeedChange) between the years 1945 and 1947.

== Electoral record ==
1949 Canadian federal election: Qu'Appelle
| Party | Candidate | Votes | % | ±% |
|---|---|---|---|---|
| Liberal | Austin Edwin Dewar | 9,017 | 44.7 | +15.1 |
| Co-operative Commonwealth | Gladys Strum | 7,629 | 37.8 | +0.4 |
| Progressive Conservative | Rhys Graham Williams | 3,519 | 17.5 | -15.5 |
| Total valid votes | | 20,165 | 100.0 | |

1945 Canadian federal election: Qu'Appelle
| Party | Candidate | Votes | % | ±% |
|---|---|---|---|---|
| Co-operative Commonwealth | Gladys Strum | 6,146 | 37.4 | |
| Progressive Conservative | Ernest Perley | 5,415 | 33.0 | -21.9 |
| Liberal | Gen. Andrew George Latta McNaughton | 4,871 | 29.6 | -15.5 |
| Total valid votes | | 16,432 | 100.0 | |

Note: Progressive Conservative vote is compared to "National Government" vote in 1940 election. Social Credit vote is compared to New Democracy vote in 1940 election.

Legislative Assembly of Saskatchewan
| Preceded by John H. Sturdy | Member of the Legislative Assembly for Saskatoon City; 1960–1964; Served alongside: Arthur T. Stone and Alexander Malcolm Nicholson | Succeeded by John Edward Brockelbank, Wesley A. Robbins, Sally Merchant, and Harry D. Link |
