= James Wilfred Estey =

Canadian politician (1889–1956)

The Honourable James Wilfred Estey
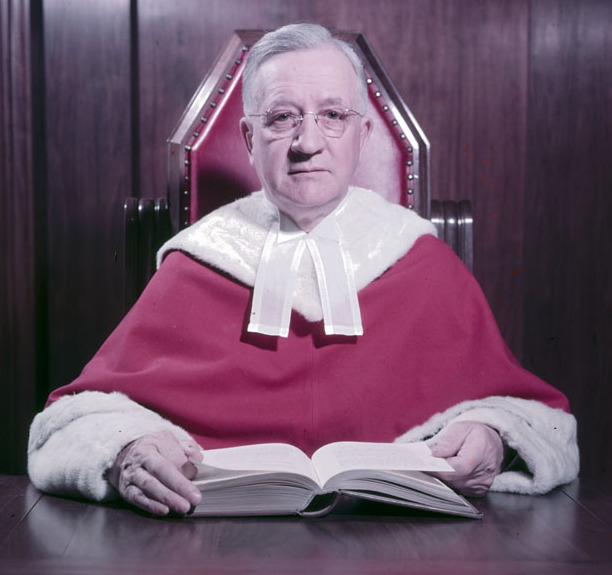
- Estey, c. 1949

Puisne Justice of the Supreme Court of Canada
- In office October 6, 1944 – January 22, 1956
- Nominated by: William Lyon Mackenzie King
- Preceded by: Henry Hague Davis
- Succeeded by: Henry Grattan Nolan

Personal details
- Born: December 1, 1889 Keswick Ridge, New Brunswick
- Died: January 22, 1956 (aged 66) Ottawa, Ontario
- Children: Willard Estey
- Education: University of New Brunswick (BA); Harvard Law School (LLB)
- Profession: Lawyer

James Wilfred (Bill) Estey (December 1, 1889 – January 22, 1956) was a Canadian lawyer, politician, and jurist.

== Early life ==
James Wilfred Estey was born in Keswick Ridge, New Brunswick, the son of Byron Leslie Estey and Sarah Ann Kee. He attended the University of New Brunswick, where he graduated with a Bachelor of Arts in 1910. In 1915, he received a Bachelor of Laws from Harvard University. In 1917, he was called to the Saskatchewan bar. He later founded Estey, Moxon, Schmitt & McDonald, which continues today as Robertson Stromberg LLP. From 1915 to 1921, Estey was assistant to the Saskatoon Crown prosecutor, and from 1921 to 1929, he acted as the local agent in Saskatoon for the provincial attorney general. He also taught law and economics at the University of Saskatchewan.

== Political career ==
In 1934, Estey was elected to the Legislative Assembly of Saskatchewan as a Liberal in Saskatoon City, which elected two members. He was elected alongside Liberal George Wesley Norman. Estey and Norman defeated the Conservative incumbents, James Thomas Milton Anderson and Howard McConnell, and Estey was re-elected alongside Liberal Robert Mitford Pinder in the 1938 general election.

Estey served in cabinet as Minister of Education from 1934 to 1941 in the Gardiner and Patterson governments, and as the Attorney General from 1939 to 1944. In the 1944 Saskatchewan general election, the Co-operative Commonwealth Federation, led by Tommy Douglas, swept into power. Estey and Pinder were defeated in Saskatoon City by John Henry Sturdy and Arthur Thomas Stone.

== Justice of the Supreme Court of Canada ==
On October 6, 1944, Prime Minister William Lyon Mackenzie King appointed Estey to the Supreme Court of Canada at the age of 54, filling the western Canadian vacancy created by the retirement of Lyman Duff. He was the second Saskatchewan judge of the Supreme Court after John Henderson Lamont. Historians Snell and Vaughan note that Estey's appointment followed King's patronage blueprint for Court appointments, prior judicial experience was not required, and instead service to the Liberal Party and influential political connections were important factors. The western vacancy filled by Estey was contested by representatives from British Columbia, Alberta, and Saskatchewan. British Columbia was largely ignored because Duff had represented the province for over 37 years, and calls from Alberta Senator Aristide Blais were insufficient to overcome Saskatchewan's influence in King's cabinet and the Liberal Party. Minister of Agriculture James Garfield Gardiner led the Saskatchewan campaign with other members of parliament, and proposed Estey, Thomas Clayton Davis, and Chief Justice of Saskatchewan William Melville Martin.

In Canadian Wheat Board v Manitoba Pool Elevators (1950), Estey and Patrick Kerwin both dissented in the 5–2 decision. They would have upheld the federal government’s price-setting and compulsory acquisition scheme, enacted under an Order in Council, on the basis that the relevant legislation was broad enough to authorize the government's actions. (Note: Canadian Wheat Board v Nolan et al, 1950 CanLII 47, [1951] SCR 81 (20 November 1950), Supreme Court (Canada)) On appeal to the Privy Council, Lord Radcliffe overturned the Supreme Court majority, holding that the Order in Council was valid because the statute clearly and unambiguously conferred the necessary authority. (Note: Canadian Wheat Board v Manitoba Pool Elevators [1952] UKPC 336, [1952] AC 427, 1952 CanLII 336 (20 May 1952), P.C. (on appeal from Canada))

Estey served until his death on January 22, 1956 at Ottawa Civic Hospital. Prime Minister St. Laurent appointed Henry Grattan Nolan as his replacement.

== Personal life ==
He is the father of Willard Estey, also a justice of the Supreme Court of Canada. He was a Baptist and a teetotaller.

Legislative Assembly of Saskatchewan
Preceded by James Thomas Milton Anderson and Howard McConnell	Member of the Legislative Assembly for Saskatoon City; 1934–1944; Served alongside: Robert Mitford Pinder	Succeeded by John H. Sturdy and Arthur T. Stone
