= John Edward Brockelbank =

Canadian politician (1931–2020)

The Honourable John Edward Brockelbank ECS

Member of the Legislative Assembly of Saskatchewan
- In office 1967–1982
- In office 1986–1991

Saskatchewan Minister of Public Works
- In office 1972–1972

Saskatchewan Minister of Government Services and Minister of Telephones
- In office 1972–1975

John Edward Brockelbank (February 23, 1931 – February 3, 2020) was an instrument technician and former political figure in Saskatchewan, Canada. He represented Saskatoon City from 1964 to 1967, Saskatoon Mayfair from 1967 to 1975 and Saskatoon Westmount from 1975 to 1982 and 1986 to 1991 as a member of the NDP.

He was born in Tisdale, Saskatchewan, in 1931, the son of John Hewgill Brockelbank and Ellen Buchanan Bell, and was educated in Steen, Regina and Westminster, England. In 1954, he married Ina Marie Boyle. He was Minister of Public Works in 1972 and Minister of Government Services and Minister of Telephones from 1972 to 1975. Brockelbank served as speaker for the Saskatchewan assembly from 1975 to 1982. He died on February 3, 2020, at the age of 88.

Legislative Assembly of Saskatchewan
Preceded by Arthur T. Stone and Gladys Strum	Member of the Legislative Assembly for Saskatoon City; 1964–1967; Served alongside: Alexander Malcolm Nicholson, Wesley A. Robbins, Sally Merchant, and Harry D. Link	Riding abolished
New district	Member of the Legislative Assembly for Saskatoon Mayfair; 1967–1975	Succeeded by Beverly Milton Dyck
New district	Member of the Legislative Assembly for Saskatoon Westmount; 1975–1982	Succeeded by Gay Caswell
Preceded by Gay Caswell	Member of the Legislative Assembly for Saskatoon Westmount; 1986–1991	Succeeded by Janice MacKinnon
