= James Thomas Milton Anderson =

5th Premier of Saskatchewan (1929–1934)

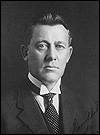
- Anderson, c. 1930

5th Premier of Saskatchewan
- In office September 9, 1929 – July 19, 1934
- Monarch: George V
- Lieutenant Governor: Henry William Newlands; Hugh Edwin Munroe
- Preceded by: James Garfield Gardiner
- Succeeded by: James Garfield Gardiner

Member of the Legislative Assembly of Saskatchewan for Saskatoon City
- In office June 2, 1925 – June 19, 1934 Serving with Archibald Peter McNab, Howard McConnell
- Preceded by: Harris Turner
- Succeeded by: James Wilfred Estey; George Wesley Norman

Personal details
- Born: July 23, 1878 Fairbank, Ontario (now a neighbourhood of Toronto)
- Died: December 29, 1946 (aged 68) Saskatoon, Saskatchewan
- Party: Conservative
- Profession: Lawyer

James Thomas Milton Anderson (July 23, 1878 – December 29, 1946) was the fifth premier of Saskatchewan and the first Conservative to hold the office.

== Early career ==
Anderson was chosen as leader of the Conservatives in 1924 and was one of the party's three Members of the Legislative Assembly elected in the 1925 election.

== Premiership ==
In the 1929 election, the Conservatives were able to exploit patronage scandals surrounding the Liberal government of Saskatchewan Premier James Garfield Gardiner to achieve a major breakthrough by winning 24 seats. The Liberals won 28 seats, with 5 going to the Progressive Party and the remaining 4 to independents. The Liberals tried to form a minority government but were defeated in a motion of no confidence, which allowed Anderson to form a co-operative government, a coalition between the Conservatives, Progressives and Independents.

Anderson was accused of working closely with the Ku Klux Klan, which was a major force in the province in the late 1920s and the early 1930s with an estimated 25,000 members. Pat Emmons, a senior Klan defector, alleged that Anderson and Klan officials regularly met, and the Liberals accused the Conservatives of being a front for the Klan. With few Blacks in the province, and First Nations largely confined to Indian reserves under the informal pass system, the focus of the Klan was against immigration, Catholics, and francophones; as well as opposition to the Gardiner Liberals, who were seen as supporting all three of those groups.

Anderson denied the allegations, but upon gaining power, he took the portfolio of Minister of Education while he was premier and proposed amendments to the Schools Act to ban the instruction of French in public schools and to outlaw the display of religious symbols in all schools, including the Catholic separate school system. The Klan supported those changes and worked hard to elect and defend the Conservative-dominated government.

== Loss of office ==
The Anderson government also had to face the onset of the Great Depression and the Dust Bowl, which destroyed the province's agrarian economy. Anderson also had to deal with labour unrest culminating in the Estevan Riot of 1931. The government formed the Saskatchewan Relief Commission to try to help those affected by the drought and massive unemployment. Those efforts were insufficient, and in the 1934 elections, the Conservatives lost every seat in the legislature and remained a minor party for 40 years.

== Electoral history ==
=== Saskatchewan general elections, 1925 to 1934 ===
Anderson led the Conservative Party in three general elections, in 1925, 1929 and 1934. They came in third in seats in 1925, formed a minority government in 1929, and were completely eliminated from the Assembly in the 1934 election.

==== 1925 General election ====
In his first general election, Anderson and the Conservatives came in third, although he managed to win a seat in the Legislative Assembly.

Saskatchewan General Election: June 2, 1925
Party	Leaders	Seats Won	Popular Vote	Popular Vote Percentage
Liberal	Charles Avery Dunning^{1}	50	127,751	51.51%
Progressive	Charles Tran^{2}	6	57,142	23.04%
Conservative	James T. M. Anderson^{2}	3	45,515	18.35%
Independent	–	2	8,703	3.51%
Labour–Liberal	–	1	4,704	1.90%
Independent Liberal	–	1	2,653	1.07%
Independent Conservative	–	0	1,545	0.62%
Total		63	248,013	100.00%
Source: Elections Saskatchewan — Elections Results — 1925

^{1} Premier when election was called; Premier after the election.
^{2} Co-Leaders of the Opposition after the election.

==== 1929 General election ====
Anderson led the Conservatives to a much improved result in the 1929 election, being only eight seats short of a majority in a hung parliament. Premier Gardiner and the Liberals had four more seats than the Conservatives. Gardiner chose to face the Assembly in hopes of obtaining sufficient support from some of the opposition members to maintain his government. Anderson organized a vote on a confidence motion which defeated the government. Gardiner resigned and Anderson became Premier.

Saskatchewan General Election: June 6, 1929
Party	Leaders	Seats Won	Popular Vote	Popular Vote Percentage
Liberal	James Garfield Gardiner^{1}	28	164,487	45.56%
Conservative	James T. M. Anderson^{2}	24	131,550	36.44%
Independent	–	6	32,729	9.06%
Progressive	–	5	24,988	6.92%
Liberal–Labour	–	0	4,181	1.16%
Economic Group	–	0	1,942	0.54%
Independent Liberal	–	0	1,160	0.32%
Total		63	361,037	100.00%
Source: Elections Saskatchewan — Elections Results — 1929

^{1} Premier when election was called; lost confidence motion in the Assembly after the election; resigned as Premier and became Leader of the Opposition.
^{2} Co-Leader of the Opposition when the election was called; became Premier after successful vote of non-confidence in the Gardiner government.

==== 1934 General election ====
Anderson was Premier for almost five years and led the Conservatives into the 1934 election, at the depths of the Great Depression and Dirty Thirties. The Conservatives were routed, losing every seat, although they came in second in the popular vote. The Liberals under Gardiner won a massive majority, with all but five seats in the Legislative Assembly. The Farmer-Labour Party formed the Opposition.

Saskatchewan General Election: June 19, 1934
Party	Leaders	Seats Won	Popular Vote	Popular Vote Percentage
Liberal	James Garfield Gardiner^{1}	50	206,212	48.00%
Farmer-Labour	M. J. Coldwell^{2}	5	102,944	23.96%
Conservative	James T. M. Anderson^{3}	0	114,923	26.75%
Independent	–	0	2,949	0.69%
Labour	–	0	1,420	0.33%
United Front	–	0	1,053	0.24%
Independent Liberal	–	0	133	0.03%
Total		55	429,634	100.00%
Source: Elections Saskatchewan — Elections Results — 1934

^{1} Leader of the Opposition when election was called; Premier after the election.
^{2} Party leader during the election, but failed to win seat; role as Leader of the Opposition taken by George Hara Williams.
^{3} Premier when election was called; lost seat in the election and resigned as Premier.

=== Saskatchewan constituency elections ===
Anderson stood for election five times, all in the riding of Saskatoon City, which returned two members. After becoming Premier after the 1929 general election, he was required by the electoral law at that time to be re-elected in a by-election, which he won by acclamation. He won two contested elections and lost two.

==== 1925 General election: Saskatoon City ====
Saskatchewan General Election, June 2, 1925: Saskatoon City (Two Members)
Party	Candidate	Popular Vote	%
Liberal	E X Archibald Peter McNab	5,249	23.69%
Conservative	E James T. M. Anderson	5,001	22.57%
Conservative	George Arthur Cruise	4,250	19.18%
Liberal	Gilbert Harrison Yule	3,869	17.46%
Progressive	X Harris Turner	3,786	17.09%
Total		22,155	99.99%^{1}
Source: Saskatchewan Archives — Election Results by Electoral Division — Saskatoon City

E Elected.
X Incumbent.
^{1} Rounding error.

==== 1929 General election: Saskatoon City ====
Saskatchewan General Election, June 2, 1929: Saskatoon City (Two Members)
Party	Candidate	Popular Vote	%
Conservative	E X Howard McConnell	10,141	31.77%
Conservative	E X James T. M. Anderson	9,668	30.29%
Liberal	James Wilfred Estey	6,092	19.09%
Liberal	Charles Wesley McCool	6,017	18.85%
Total		31,918	100.00%
Source: Saskatchewan Archives — Election Results by Electoral Division — Saskatoon City

E Elected.
X Incumbent.

==== 1929 By-election: Saskatoon City ====
Saskatchewan Ministerial By-election, September 30, 1929: Saskatoon City
Party	Candidate	Popular Vote	%
Conservative	E X James T. M. Anderson	Acclaimed	–
Conservative	E X Howard McConnell	Acclaimed	–
Total		–	–
Source: Saskatchewan Archives — Election Results by Electoral Division — Saskatoon City

E Elected.
X Incumbent.

==== 1934 General election: Saskatoon City ====
Saskatchewan General Election, June 19, 1934: Saskatoon City (Two Members)
Party	Candidate	Popular Vote	%
Liberal	E James Wilfred Estey	9,168	23.88%
Liberal	E George Wesley Norman	8,670	22.58%
Conservative	X James T. M. Anderson	7,511	19.56%
Conservative	X Howard McConnell	6,797	17.70%
Farmer–Labour	Gladys Isabel Salisbury	3,098	8.07%
Farmer–Labour	John Johnson Egge	2,797	7.28%
United Farmers	William Taylor	353	0.92%
Total		38,394	99.9%^{1}
Source: Saskatchewan Archives — Election Results by Electoral Division — Saskatoon City

E Elected.
X Incumbent.
^{1} Rounding error.

==== 1938 General election: Saskatoon City ====
Saskatchewan General Election, June 8, 1938: Saskatoon City (Two Members)
Party	Candidate	Popular Vote	%
Liberal	E Robert Mitford Pinder	7,213	19.43%
Liberal	E X James Wilfred Estey	6,893	18.57%
Conservative	James T. M. Anderson	5,006	13.48%
Independent Labour	Robert Hunter	4,813	12.97%
Conservative	Stephen N. MacEachern	4,692	12.64%
Social Credit	Jacob Klassen	4,339	11.69%
Social Credit	John Harrison Hilton	4,164	11.22%
Total		37,120	100.00%
Source: Saskatchewan Archives — Election Results by Electoral Division — Saskatoon City]

E Elected.
X Incumbent.

== Sources ==
- Encyclopedia of Saskatchewan
- The Canadian Encyclopedia
- Saskatchewan Archives Board – Saskatchewan Election Results By Electoral Division

Party political offices
Preceded by Donald Maclean	Leader of the Conservative Party of Saskatchewan; 1924–1936	Succeeded by John Diefenbaker
