= Samuel Huston =

Samuel Huston may refer to:

- Samuel B. Huston (1858–1920), American politician and lawyer
- Samuel Wesley Huston (1873–1933), politician in Saskatchewan, Canada
- Samuel Huston of Marengo, Iowa who helped establish Samuel Huston College

== See also ==
- Sam Houston (1793–1863), American politician and soldier
