= Austin Edwin Dewar =

Canadian politician

Member of Parliament for Qu'Appelle
- In office June 1949 – June 1953
- Preceded by: Gladys Strum
- Succeeded by: Henry Mang

Personal details
- Born: 24 April 1912 Indian Head, Saskatchewan, Canada
- Died: 15 December 1985 (aged 73) Indian Head, Saskatchewan, Canada
- Party: Liberal
- Spouse(s): Mildred N. Bjorndahl m. 29 June 1940
- Profession: agent, contractor, farmer, grain merchant, hotelier

Austin Edwin Dewar (24 April 1912 – 15 December 1985) was a Liberal party member of the House of Commons of Canada. He was born in Indian Head, Saskatchewan and became an insurance agent, contractor, farmer, grain merchant and hotelier by career.

He was first elected to Parliament at the Qu'Appelle riding in the 1949 general election. After serving in the 21st Canadian Parliament, Dewar did not seek another federal term in the 1953 election.

1949 Canadian federal election: Qu'Appelle
Party	Candidate	Votes	%	±%
Liberal	Austin Edwin Dewar	9,017	44.7	+15.1
Co-operative Commonwealth	Gladys Strum	7,629	37.8	+0.4
Progressive Conservative	Rhys Graham Williams	3,519	17.5	-15.5
Total valid votes		20,165	100.0	
