= Saskatoon City (provincial electoral district) =

Former provincial electoral district in Saskatchewan, Canada

Coordinates: 52°07′17″N 106°39′50″W

Saskatoon City was a provincial electoral division in the Canadian province of Saskatchewan. This constituency existed from 1908 to 1967. It was the riding of Premier James T.M. Anderson.

The riding was created for the 1908 election to separate the rapidly growing city of Saskatoon from the original riding of Saskatoon, which was renamed Saskatoon County. During the 15th Saskatchewan Legislative Assembly (from 1964 to 1967), an amendment to the Representation Act divided Saskatoon City into several electoral divisions:

- Saskatoon City Park-University
- Saskatoon Mayfair
- Saskatoon Nutana Centre
- Saskatoon Nutana South
- Saskatoon Riversdale

From 1921 to 1967 Saskatoon City was one of three districts in the province that elected more than one representative to the Legislature. (The others were Regina and Moose Jaw.) Unlike its neighbours, Alberta and Manitoba, Saskatchewan elected members in multi-seat districts using plurality block voting. In almost all cases, a single party took all the seats in a district. Thus, multiple MLAs elected from this constituency will be noted in bold type.

== Election results ==
1908 Saskatchewan general election: Saskatoon City electoral district
Party	Candidate	Votes	%	±%
Liberal	Archibald Peter McNab	794	52.55%	–
Provincial Rights	James R. Wilson	717	47.45%	–
Total		1,511	100.00%	

24 December 1908 By-Election: Saskatoon City electoral district
Party	Candidate	Votes	%	±%
Liberal	Archibald Peter McNab	Acclaimed	100.00%	
Total		Acclamation		

1912 Saskatchewan general election: Saskatoon City electoral district
Party	Candidate	Votes	%	±%
Liberal	Archibald Peter McNab	1,460	51.79%	-
Conservative	Hugh Edwin Munroe	1,359	48.21%	-
Total		2,819	100.00%	

1917 Saskatchewan general election: Saskatoon City electoral district
Party	Candidate	Votes	%	±%
Conservative	Donald Maclean	2,592	52.23%	+4.02
Liberal	Philip Edward Mackenzie	1,895	38.18%	-13.61
Labour	Alexander Melville Eddy	476	9.59%	–
Total		4,963	100.00%	

1921 Saskatchewan general election: Saskatoon City – 2 members elected
Party	Candidate	Votes	%	±%
Independent	**Harris Turner**	4,672	26.35%	–
Liberal	**Archibald Peter McNab**	4,198	23.67%	-
Liberal	John Alexander Valens	3,879	21.88%	-
Conservative	George Arthur Cruise	3,293	18.57%	-
Independent Labour	Alexander Melville Eddy	1,690	9.53%	-
Total		17,732	100.00%	

1925 Saskatchewan general election: Saskatoon City – 2 members elected
Party	Candidate	Votes	%	±%
Liberal	**Archibald Peter McNab**	5,249	23.69%	-
Conservative	**James Thomas Milton Anderson**	5,001	22.58%	-
Conservative	George Arthur Cruise	4,250	19.18%	-
Liberal	Gilbert Harrison Yule	3,869	17.46%	-
Progressive	Harris Turner	3,786	17.09%	–
Total		22,155	100.00%	

21 January 1927 By-Election: Saskatoon City - Seat #1
Party	Candidate	Votes	%	±%
Conservative	**Howard McConnell**	5,288	55.09%	-
Liberal	John McDougal	4,311	44.91%	-
Total		9,599	100.00%	

1929 Saskatchewan general election: Saskatoon City – 2 members elected
Party	Candidate	Votes	%	±%
Conservative	**Howard McConnell**	10,141	31.77%	-
Conservative	**James Thomas Milton Anderson**	9,668	30.29%	-
Liberal	James Wilfred Estey	6,092	19.09%	-
Liberal	Charles Wesley McCool	6,017	18.85%	-
Total		31,918	100.00%	

30 September 1929 By-Election: Saskatoon City – 2 members elected
Party	Candidate	Votes	%	±%
Conservative	James Thomas Milton Anderson	Acclaimed		
Conservative	Howard McConnell	Acclaimed		
Total		Acclamation		

1934 Saskatchewan general election: Saskatoon City – 2 members elected
Party	Candidate	Votes	%	±%
Liberal	**James Wilfred Estey**	9,168	23.88%	-
Liberal	**George Wesley Norman**	8,670	22.58%	-
Conservative	James Thomas Milton Anderson	7,511	19.56%	-
Conservative	Howard McConnell	6,797	17.70%	-
Farmer-Labour	Gladys Isabel Salisbury	3,098	8.07%	–
Farmer-Labour	John Johnson Egge	2,797	7.29%	–
United Front	William Taylor	353	0.92%	–
Total		38,394	100.00%	

1938 Saskatchewan general election: Saskatoon City – 2 members elected
Party	Candidate	Votes	%	±%
Liberal	**Robert Mitford Pinder**	7,213	19.43%	-
Liberal	**James Wilfred Estey**	6,893	18.57%	-
Conservative	James Thomas Milton Anderson	5,006	13.49%	-
Independent Labour	Robert Hunter	4,813	12.96%	-
Conservative	Stephen N. MacEachern	4,692	12.64%	-
Social Credit	Jacob Klassen	4,339	11.69%	–
Social Credit	John Harrison Hilton	4,164	11.22%	–
Total		37,120	100.00%	

1944 Saskatchewan general election: Saskatoon City – 2 members elected
Party	Candidate	Votes	%	±%
CCF	**John H. Sturdy**	9,375	26.16%	-
CCF	**Arthur T. Stone**	7,792	21.75%	-
Prog. Conservative	Rupert D. Ramsay	5,368	14.98%	-
Liberal	James Wilfred Estey	5,084	14.19%	-
Liberal	Robert Mitford Pinder	3,924	10.95%	-
Prog. Conservative	Henry O. Wright	3,171	8.85%	-
Labor-Progressive	F. Nelson Clarke	797	2.22%	–
Independent	Russell Hartney	200	0.56%	-
Independent	John Harrison Hilton	121	0.34%	-
Total		35,832	100.00%	

1948 Saskatchewan general election: Saskatoon City – 2 members elected
Party	Candidate	Votes	%	±%
CCF	**John H. Sturdy**	14,970	26.66%	-
CCF	**Arthur T. Stone**	14,295	25.46%	-
Prog. Conservative	Rupert D. Ramsay	13,376	23.82%	-
Liberal	L. Charles Sherman	11,551	20.57%	-
Social Credit	Malcolm J. Haver	1,959	3.49%	-
Total		56,151	100.00%	

1952 Saskatchewan general election Approx. 35,000 voters cast votes in this election

1952 Saskatchewan general election: Saskatoon City – 2 members elected
Party	Candidate	Votes	%	±%
CCF	**John H. Sturdy**	16,546	29.63%	-
CCF	**Arthur T. Stone**	16,228	29.06%	-
Liberal	Jessie Caldwell	8,315	14.89%	-
Liberal	James L. Robertson	7,716	13.82%	-
Prog. Conservative	John Hnatyshyn	2,947	5.28%	-
Prog. Conservative	Percy H. Maguire	2,869	5.14%	-
Social Credit	Malcolm J. Haver	661	1.18%	-
Social Credit	Fred E. Roluf	559	1.00%	-
Total		55,841	100.00%	

1956 Saskatchewan general election Approx. 35,000 voters cast votes in this election

1956 Saskatchewan general election: Saskatoon City – 2 members elected
Party	Candidate	Votes	%	±%
CCF	**John H. Sturdy**	15,368	27.11%	-
CCF	**Arthur T. Stone**	15,014	26.49%	-
Liberal	Robert A. Heggie	6,393	11.28%	-
Liberal	Marion M. Graham	5,846	10.32%	-
Social Credit	Robert J. Soberg	4,143	7.31%	-
Social Credit	Joseph R. Fernets	3,982	7.03%	-
Prog. Conservative	Alvin Hamilton	3,534	6.23%	-
Prog. Conservative	Lillie F. Bowman	2,280	4.02%	-
Labor-Progressive	Lorne Lynn	117	0.21%	-
Total		56,677	100.00%	

1960 Saskatchewan general election Approx. 40,000 voters cast votes in this election

1960 Saskatchewan general election: Saskatoon City – 3 members elected
Party	Candidate	Votes	%	±%
CCF	**Arthur T. Stone**	16,159	14.63%	-
CCF	**Alex M. Nicholson**	15,877	14.38%	-
CCF	**Gladys Strum**	15,782	14.29%	-
Liberal	Herbert C. Pinder	11,582	10.49%	-
Liberal	William Loran	11,346	10.28%	-
Liberal	Robert A. Heggie	11,244	10.18%	-
Prog. Conservative	Lewis Brand	7,042	6.38%	-
Prog. Conservative	Edward M. Hughes	6,972	6.31%	-
Prog. Conservative	Thomas Park	5,676	5.14%	-
Social Credit	Earle Williams	3,032	2.75%	-
Social Credit	Morris Chernetsky	2,949	2.67%	-
Social Credit	John K. Rodine	2,767	2.50%	-
Total		110,428	100.00%	

1964 Saskatchewan general election Approx. 50,000 voters cast votes in this election

1964 Saskatchewan general election: Saskatoon City – 5 members elected
Party	Candidate	Votes	%	±%
CCF	**Alex M. Nicholson**	16,701	7.83%	-
CCF	**Ed Brockelbank**	16,559	7.76%	-
CCF	**Wes Robbins**	16,126	7.56%	-
Liberal	**Sally Merchant**	16,068	7.53%	-
CCF	**Harry D. Link**	16,041	7.52%	-
Liberal	Clarence L. B. Estey	15,761	7.39%	-
CCF	Gladys Strum	15,741	7.38%	-
Liberal	Keith M. Crocker	15,661	7.34%	-
Liberal	Joseph J. Charlebois	15,542	7.28%	-
Liberal	Victor C. Hession	14,770	6.92%	-
Prog. Conservative	Lewis Brand	11,401	5.34%	-
Prog. Conservative	W. Hugh Arscott	11,344	5.32%	-
Prog. Conservative	Ray Hnatyshyn	10,874	5.09%	-
Prog. Conservative	Henry C. Rees	10,543	4.94%	-
Prog. Conservative	Irving Goldenberg	10,240	4.80%	-
Total		213,372	100.00%	

== See also ==
- List of Saskatchewan provincial electoral districts
- List of Saskatchewan general elections
- Canadian provincial electoral districts
