= James Fraser Bryant =

Canadian politician

James Fraser Bryant (May 19, 1877 – September 18, 1945) was a lawyer, judge and political figure in Saskatchewan, Canada. He represented Lumsden in the Legislative Assembly of Saskatchewan from 1929 to 1934 as a Conservative.

He was born in Glen Allan, Ontario, the son of Reverend James Bryant and Dora McGill, and was educated at Upper Canada College, Queen's University and the University of Manitoba. He articled in law in Regina, Saskatchewan, was called to the bar in 1906 and set up practice in Regina. In 1908, he married Mabel Myra Boyd. Bryant served as chairman of the Regina public school board and president of the Saskatchewan School Trustees. He ran unsuccessfully for a seat in the Saskatchewan assembly in 1925. He served briefly as Speaker of the Legislative Assembly of Saskatchewan in September 1929. Bryant was Minister of Public Works, and Telephones and Telegraphs in the provincial cabinet from 1929 to 1934. He was defeated when he ran for reelection in 1934. Bryant was named a judge in the Saskatoon district court, serving until his death at the age of 68.
