= Gay Caswell =

Canadian politician (1948–2025)

Gay Caswell (née White; May 30, 1948 – January 2, 2025) was a Canadian writer and politician in Saskatchewan. She represented Saskatoon Westmount from 1982 to 1986 in the Legislative Assembly of Saskatchewan as a Progressive Conservative.

== Life and career ==
Caswell was born as Gay White at Davidson, Saskatchewan in 1948, the daughter of Eric W. White and Ann Patricia Foster. In 1971, she married John R. Caswell of Saskatoon. The couple had six children. She was defeated by John Edward Brockelbank when she ran for reelection to the Saskatchewan assembly in 1986.

In September 2009, senior Saskatchewan Crown prosecutor Wayne Buckle was awarded damages of $50,000 for comments posed on Caswell's blog; Caswell was also ordered to remove all internet postings about Buckle. As of 2009, Caswell was living in Brabant Lake. Gay Caswell died in Prince Albert, Saskatchewan on January 2, 2025 at age 76.
