= Charles Tran =

Canadian politician

Charles Ernest Tran

MLA for Pelly
- In office 1925–1929
- Preceded by: Sarah Ramsland
- Succeeded by: Reginald Parker

Personal details
- Born: January 29, 1878 Barrie, Ontario, Canada
- Died: March 24, 1934 (aged 56) Kamsack, Saskatchewan
- Party: Progressive
- Occupation: physician

Charles Ernest Tran (January 29, 1878 – March 24, 1934) was a Canadian physician and politician in the province of Saskatchewan. He represented Pelly from 1925 to 1929 in the Legislative Assembly of Saskatchewan as a Progressive Party member.

He was born in Barrie, Ontario, the son of William Tran and Mary English, and was educated in Barrie and at The Western University of London, Ontario (now the University of Western Ontario). Tran came west, settling in Kamsack, Saskatchewan. In 1912, he married Louise McGale. Tran served in the Canadian Medical Corps during World War I. He was mayor of Kamsack from 1914 to 1916 and in 1919, 1921, 1923 and 1926. Tran also owned a pharmacy in Kamsack. From 1925 to 1929, as leader of the Progressive Party, he shared the position of leader of the opposition in the provincial assembly with James Thomas Milton Anderson, the leader of the Conservative party.

Tran retired from politics in 1929 but continued to practise medicine. He died in Kamsack on March 24, 1934, following a stroke, at the age of 56.
