= Louis Henry Hantelman =

Canadian politician and farmer

Louis Henry "Lou" Hantelman (May 20, 1884 – January 6, 1966) was a Saskatchewan farmer and politician.

Born and raised in Dubuque, Iowa, Hantelman came to Rouleau, Saskatchewan in 1905 to farm. During World War I he joined the 46th Battalion of the Canadian Expeditionary Force and served in France where he rose to the rank of lieutenant.

He resumed farming near Plato after the war. He became active in agrarian politics and was elected to the Saskatchewan legislature in the 1934 general election as a member of the Farmer-Labour Group which subsequently became the Saskatchewan CCF. He served for two terms before retiring in 1944. He subsequently served on the Board of Governors of the University of Saskatchewan and as chair of the university's hospital board.
