= Frederick Bagshaw =

Canadian politician (1878–1966)

Frederick Bertram Bagshaw (August 15, 1878 – June 19, 1966) was an English-born lawyer and political figure in Saskatchewan. He was a soldier's representative in the Legislative Assembly of Saskatchewan from 1917 to 1921.

He was born in Southport, Lancashire. Bagshaw served overseas with the Canadian Cavalry and was wounded twice during World War I.

Bagshaw represented Saskatchewan soldiers serving in Belgium in the assembly. From 1941 to 1945, he was enforcement counsel for the Wartime Prices and Trade Board. Bagshaw was awarded the OBE. He worked with the Canadian National Institute for the Blind and the Great War Veterans' Association. Bagshaw was named to the Regina Library Board in 1941 and served for 21 years.

Bagshaw Place in Regina was named in his honour.
