= S. N. MacEachern =

Stephen Neil MacEachern (February 9, 1894 – December 26, 1974) was a politician in Saskatchewan, Canada. He served as mayor of Saskatoon from 1941 to 1943.

The son of Archibald A. McEachern and Kate Gillis, he was born in Grand Mira, Nova Scotia and studied law at Dalhousie University. In 1921, he moved to Saskatoon. MacEachern taught at Nutana Collegiate from 1921 to 1940. He served on Saskatoon city council from 1934 to 1940. In 1938, he ran unsuccessfully for the Saskatoon City seat in the provincial assembly. MacEachern resigned as mayor in 1943 to become Saskatoon Board of Trade commissioner. In 1946, he became manager for the Saskatoon Exhibition. He resigned from the Board of Trade in 1959 to concentrate on the Saskatoon Exhibition. He also served on the board of governors for the University of Saskatchewan and on the Saskatoon Separate School Board. MacEachern died at the age of 80.

MacEachern Avenue in Saskatoon was named in his honour and the administration building for the Saskatoon Exhibition was renamed the Steve MacEachern Building in 1975.
