= Robert Mitford Pinder =

Canadian politician

Robert Mitford Pinder (December 14, 1890 – August 1, 1946) was a pharmacist, entrepreneur and political figure in Saskatchewan, Canada. He represented Saskatoon City in the Legislative Assembly of Saskatchewan from 1938 to 1944 as a Liberal. Pinder was mayor of Saskatoon from 1935 to 1938.

Born in North Toronto, Ontario, the son of Abraham Pinder and Polly Savage – who came to Canada from Yorkshire, England – he was educated in Elgin, Manitoba and at the Pharmacy College in Winnipeg; then moved to Saskatoon in 1914. He worked for the Saskatoon Drug and Stationery Company, eventually becoming part owner and then sole owner. In 1916, Pinder married Helen Rose. He served on the city council for Saskatoon from 1928 to 1933.

The company he established, Pinder's Drugs, continued to be operated by the Pinder family until 1992 when it was sold to Shoppers Drug Mart.

His son Herbert Charles Pinder also served in the Saskatchewan assembly. In recognition of his contributions to the city of Saskatoon, Pinder Crescent in the city's Avalon neighbourhood was named in his honor.

An ice hockey player in his 20s, Pinder later coached the Saskatoon Sheiks of the Western Canada Hockey League during the 1921–22 season. He was the grandfather of ice hockey players Gerry and Herb Pinder through his son Herbert Pinder, Sr.

Legislative Assembly of Saskatchewan
Preceded by George Wesley Norman	Member of the Legislative Assembly for Saskatoon City; 1938–1944; Served alongside: James Wilfred Estey	Succeeded by John H. Sturdy and Arthur T. Stone
