= Allan Pickel =

Canadian politician

Allan Demetrius Pickel (1878 – 1955) was a general merchant and political figure in Saskatchewan. He represented The Battlefords in the Legislative Assembly of Saskatchewan from 1917 to 1929 as a Liberal.

He was born in Darlingford, Manitoba, the son of Sidney James Pickel and Catherine Blair, and was educated in Morden. Pickel moved to Saskatchewan in 1903. He started a business in Battleford the following year and moved to North Battleford in 1905. Pickel married Flora Mae Struther.
