= Harry David Link =

Canadian politician

Harry David Link (January 28, 1918 – February 4, 2002) was a salesman and political figure in Saskatchewan. He represented Saskatoon City from 1964 to 1967 in the Legislative Assembly of Saskatchewan as a New Democratic Party (NDP) member.

He was born in Hodgeville, Saskatchewan, the son of Fred Link and Mary Knack, both natives of Germany, and was educated in Beechy. Link served in the Royal Canadian Air Force during World War II. He married Joan Hutchby in 1944. In 1954, Link became the owner of Capital Real Estate and later served as president of the Saskatchewan Real Estate Association. He was a director for the Saskatoon Co-op and also served as provincial president for the Saskatchewan CCF. Link was defeated by George Loken when he ran for the Rosetown seat in the provincial assembly in 1967.
