= George Ernest Dragan =

Canadian politician

George Ernest Dragan (February 22, 1898 – January 29, 1965) was a physician and political figure in Saskatchewan. He represented Kelvington from 1934 to 1938 in the Legislative Assembly of Saskatchewan as a Liberal.

He was born in Pleasant Home, Manitoba, the son of Stefan Dragan and Anna Luikas, both Ukrainian immigrants, and was educated in Manitoba, at the agricultural college in Winnipeg, at the University of Manitoba and McGill University. In 1925, he married Rose Lazarek. Dragan established his medical practice in Saskatoon in 1926. He helped promote Ukrainian culture in Saskatchewan and, through his photographs, documented the development of Ukrainian communities in the province. Dragan was defeated when he ran in the Canora provincial riding in 1938.
