= John Louis Salkeld =

Canadian politician

John Louis Salkeld (January 21, 1858 – 1941) was a farmer and political figure in Saskatchewan. He represented Moosomin in the Legislative Assembly of Saskatchewan from 1917 to 1925 as a Conservative and from 1925 to 1929 as an independent member.

He was born in Stratford, Canada West, the son of Joseph Salkeld and Eliza Seegmiller, and was educated there. In 1884, Salkeld married Ida Lang. He served as reeve of Spy Hill, Saskatchewan for four years.
