= Howard McConnell =

Canadian politician

Howard McConnell (January 27, 1886 – October 9, 1957) was a lawyer and political figure in Saskatchewan, Canada. He represented Saskatoon City in the Legislative Assembly of Saskatchewan from 1927 to 1934 as a Conservative.

He was born in Springbrook, Ontario and taught school for a short time before joining his parents in Saskatoon in 1907. McConnell continued his studies at the University of Saskatchewan and Osgoode Hall, was called to the Saskatchewan bar in 1916 and practised law in Saskatoon. In 1929, he was named King's Counsel. McConnell was mayor of Saskatoon in 1922 and 1923. He was first elected to the provincial assembly in a 1927 by-election. He served in the province's Executive Council as Provincial Treasurer and Minister of Municipal Affairs. McConnell was defeated when he ran for reelection in 1934 and returned to his law practice. He served for 23 years in the senate for the University of Saskatchewan. He died in Saskatoon at the age of 71. McConnell Avenue in Saskatoon's Avalon community is named in his honour.

Legislative Assembly of Saskatchewan
Preceded by Archibald Peter McNab	Member of the Legislative Assembly for Saskatoon City; 1927–1934; Served alongside: James Thomas Milton Anderson	Succeeded by James Wilfred Estey and George Wesley Norman
