= James Grassick =

Canadian politician

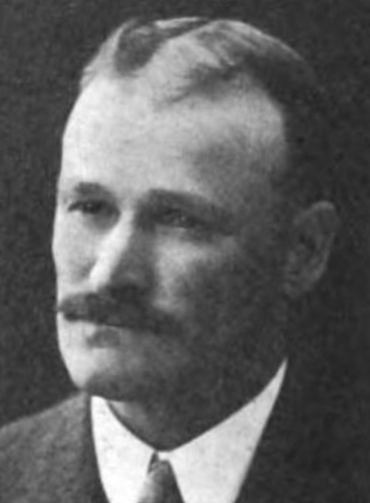

Member of the Legislative Assembly of Saskatchewan
- In office 1929–1934
- Constituency: Regina City

Personal details
- Born: March 2, 1868; Fergus, Ontario
- Died: August 4, 1956 (aged 88); Regina, Saskatchewan
- Political party: Conservative
- Spouse: Jessie Beattie (m. 1897)
- Occupation: Businessman, politician

James Grassick (March 2, 1868 – August 4, 1956) was a businessman and political figure in Saskatchewan, Canada. He represented Regina City in the Legislative Assembly of Saskatchewan from 1929 to 1934 as a Conservative.

== Biography ==
He was born in Fergus, Ontario, the son of George Grassick and Ann Jane Bell, both natives of Scotland, and moved to Manitoba with his parents in 1878. The family settled in Regina, Saskatchewan four years later. Grassick worked in the delivery business for a time before establishing the Capital Ice Company. He was also an agent for the Imperial Oil Company. In 1897, he married Jessie Beattie. Grassick served on Regina town council from 1900 to 1904 and was mayor from 1920 to 1922 and again from 1940 to 1941.

He died when he was hit by the driver of a vehicle at the age of 88. There are two parks and a street named in his honor in the city of Regina. There is also a lake in northern Saskatchewan named after him.

His daughter Marion married Justin Cyril Malone, parents of Edward Cyril Malone.
