= George Wesley Norman =

Canadian printer and politician

George Wesley Norman (October 14, 1883 – November 12, 1970) was a printer and political figure in Saskatchewan. He represented Saskatoon City in the Legislative Assembly of Saskatchewan from 1934 to 1938 as a Liberal.

He was born in Alliston, Ontario in 1883. Norman came to Saskatoon in 1902 to help his brother publish the Phoenix. In 1904, he established a commercial printing business. Norman was mayor of Saskatoon from 1927 to 1929. He retired from business in 1947 and moved to Vancouver, where he died in 1970 at the age of 87. Norman was buried in Woodlawn Cemetery in Saskatoon. Norman Crescent in Saskatoon's Avalon community is named in his honour.

He was an Alderman on Saskatoon city council in 1916 until 1926. (Saskatoon Star Phoenix Dec 9 1921 page 11, Saskatoon Star Phoenix Dec 12 1923). George came in second place in votes for Mayor in December 1926. Due to error with ballot counting a re-election was held in January 1927 and this time Norman won. The story was covered almost daily for two months in the Saskatoon newspaper Star-Phoenix. (Saskatoon Star Phoenix 1926 Dec 10 p3, 1926 Dec 15 p3, 1926 Dec 21 p3, 1927 Jan 15 p3, 1927 Jan 16 p3, 1927 Jan 25 p3, 1927 Jan 28 p3, 1927 Jan 31 p3, 1927 Feb 7 p3, 1927 Feb 8 p3, 1927 Feb 14 p3, 1927 Feb 15 p3)

Legislative Assembly of Saskatchewan
Preceded by James Thomas Milton Anderson and Howard McConnell	Member of the Legislative Assembly for Saskatoon City; 1934–1938; Served alongside: James Wilfred Estey	Succeeded by Robert Mitford Pinder
