= Henry Mang =

Canadian politician

Member of the Legislative Assembly of Saskatchewan for Lumsden
- In office 1934–1938

Member of Parliament for Qu'Appelle
- In office August 1953 – June 1957
- Preceded by: Austin Edwin Dewar
- Succeeded by: Alvin Hamilton

Personal details
- Born: Henry Philip Mang; 11 December 1897 Edenwold, Northwest Territories
- Died: 30 March 1987 (aged 89) Regina, Saskatchewan, Canada
- Party: Liberal
- Profession: dentist, farmer, teacher, principal

Henry Philip Mang (11 December 1897 – 30 March 1987) was a Liberal party member of the House of Commons of Canada. He was born in Edenwold, Northwest Territories, which is now in Saskatchewan.

Mang trained in Toronto at the Royal College of Dentistry at the University of Toronto where he also took a one-year honours course in Philosophy, English and History. He participated in World War I under the Royal Flying Corps. Eventually, his jobs included farming and teaching and became a school principal.

Between 1934 and 1938, Mang was a Liberal member of the Legislative Assembly of Saskatchewan for the Lumsden riding.

He was first elected to Parliament at the Qu'Appelle riding in the 1953 general election then after one term was defeated by Alvin Hamilton of the Progressive Conservative party in the 1957 election.

== Archives ==
There is a Henry Mang fonds at Library and Archives Canada. Archival reference number is R5818.

== Electoral record ==
1957 Canadian federal election: Qu'Appelle
Party	Candidate	Votes	%	±%
Progressive Conservative	Alvin Hamilton	6,217	34.2	+7.1
Liberal	Henry Philip Mang	5,512	30.4	-8.1
Co-operative Commonwealth	Norman Kennedy	4,279	23.6	-7.3
Social Credit	David Isman	2,150	11.8	+8.3
Total valid votes		18,158	100.0	

1953 Canadian federal election: Qu'Appelle
Party	Candidate	Votes	%	±%
Liberal	Henry Philip Mang	6,988	38.5	-6.3
Co-operative Commonwealth	Lawrence Irwin Hockley	5,612	30.9	-7.0
Progressive Conservative	Alvin Hamilton	4,930	27.1	+9.7
Social Credit	Anton Edward Kovatch	644	3.5	
Total valid votes		18,174	100.0	
