= Archibald Peter McNab =

Canadian politician

The Honourable Archibald Peter McNab
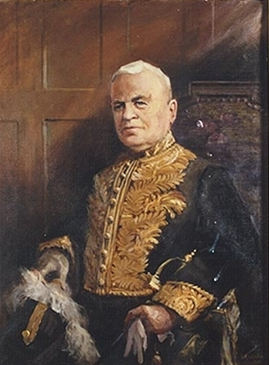
- Archibald Peter McNab during his time as Lieutenant Governor of Saskatchewan

6th Lieutenant Governor of Saskatchewan
- In office September 10, 1936 – February 27, 1945
- Monarchs: Edward VIII; George VI
- Governors General: The Lord Tweedsmuir; The Earl of Athlone
- Premier: William John Patterson; Tommy Douglas
- Preceded by: Hugh Edwin Munroe
- Succeeded by: Thomas Miller

Member of the Legislative Assembly of Saskatchewan for Saskatoon City
- In office August 14, 1908 – June 26, 1917
- Preceded by: District established
- Succeeded by: Donald Maclean
- In office June 9, 1921 – November 10, 1926 Serving with Harris Turner, J.T.M. Anderson
- Preceded by: Donald Maclean
- Succeeded by: Howard McConnell

Personal details
- Born: May 29, 1864 Glengarry County, Canada West
- Died: April 29, 1945 (aged 80) Regina, Saskatchewan, Canada
- Party: Liberal
- Spouse: Edith Wilson Todd (m. 1892)
- Children: Ernest McNab
- Occupation: Farmer, grain buyer, businessmen
- Profession: Politician
- Cabinet: Commissioner of municipal affairs (1912-1922); Minister of Public Works (1912-1922); Minister of Telephones (1922-1926)

Archibald Peter McNab (May 29, 1864 – April 29, 1945) was the sixth lieutenant governor of Saskatchewan from 1936 until 1945. He was the last lieutenant-governor of the province to live in Government House.

He was born in Glengarry County, Canada West, the son of Malcolm McNab and Margaret McCrimmon, and moved to Winnipeg in 1882 with his twin brother before establishing a homestead in Virden, Manitoba.

Years of drought forced him to give up farming and in 1887 he became a grain buyer for Ogilvie Flour Mills. In 1892, McNab married Edith Wilson Todd.

In 1902, the company transferred him to Rosthern, Saskatchewan where he invested in two grain elevators. After selling them, he moved to Saskatoon with his wife and children and established the Dominion Elevator Company. He also helped found the Saskatchewan Central Railway Company and the Saskatchewan Power Company.

He entered politics and was elected to the Saskatchewan legislature in the 1908 general election as a Liberal MLA representing Saskatoon City. In government, he was appointed commissioner of municipal affairs and became Minister of Public Works in 1912. One of his accomplishments was helping acquire the University of Saskatchewan for Saskatoon. In 1922, he was also named Minister of Telephones.

McNab retired from the legislature when he was appointed to the local government board in 1926 but was forced to resign in 1930 due to allegations of impropriety.

In 1936, he was appointed lieutenant governor of Saskatchewan. As lieutenant governor, he hosted King George VI and Queen Elizabeth at Government House during their 1939 royal visit to Canada.

The Saskatchewan Co-operative Commonwealth Federation was elected to government in the 1944 general election and closed Government House in September 1944 as an austerity measure making McNab its last occupant. He was moved to the Hotel Saskatchewan, where his successors as lieutenant governor also had their offices and lived.

In ill health, he resigned as lieutenant-governor on February 26, 1945. He died of pneumonia two months later.

His uncle Archibald McNab was a member of the Canadian House of Commons. His son Ernest McNab was a fighter pilot with the Royal Canadian Air Force during the Second World War, and led No. 1 Squadron during the Battle of Britain.
