= John Robeson Taylor =

Canadian politician

- Born: 1889; Scotland
- Died: May 26, 1976 (aged 86–87)
- Education: Brandon College
- Occupation: Politician

John Robeson Taylor (1889 – May 26, 1976) was a Scottish-born implement dealer and political figure in Saskatchewan. He represented Wadena from 1929 to 1934 in the Legislative Assembly of Saskatchewan as an independent member.

He moved to Canada at the age of 17, studied at Brandon College and then settled on a homestead in the Kelvington-Nut Mountain area in 1908. Taylor served in the Canadian Expeditionary Force during World War I and in the Canadian Veterans Guard during World War II. He served on the village council for Invermay, Saskatchewan and was a member of the local school board. Taylor ran unsuccessfully for the Mackenzie seat in the Canadian House of Commons in 1945.
