= Hugh Elliott Eaglesham =

Canadian politician

Hugh Elliott Eaglesham (June 3, 1873 – 12 October 1938) was a Canadian physician and political figure in Saskatchewan. He represented Weyburn from 1934 to 1938 in the Legislative Assembly of Saskatchewan as a Liberal.

He was born in Clifford, Ontario, the son of Hugh Eaglesham and Margaret Marshall, and was educated in Harriston and at Trinity Medical College. In 1896, he married Mary Fletcher. Eaglesham served as president of the Saskatchewan Medical Council and was coroner for Weyburn, Saskatchewan. Eaglesham defeated Tommy Douglas to win his seat in the provincial assembly in 1934.
