= Ebenezer Whatley =

Canadian politician

Ebenezer Samuel Whatley (December 26, 1878 – 1933) was an English-born farmer and political figure in Saskatchewan. He represented Kindersley in the Legislative Assembly of Saskatchewan from 1925 to 1933 as a Progressive Party member.

He was born in Overton, the son of Samuel Horder Whatley and Elizabeth Fry, and was educated in Cirencester. Whatley served with the British in South Africa from 1900 to 1901. He came to Canada in 1903. In 1912, Whatley married Agnes Ellen Lawrence. He lived in Kindersley, Saskatchewan. Whatley died in office in 1933.
