= George Cockburn (Saskatchewan politician) =

Canadian politician

George Cockburn (March 27, 1876 – March 6, 1966) was a farmer and political figure in Saskatchewan. He represented Redberry in the Legislative Assembly of Saskatchewan from 1921 to 1934 as an independent, then as a member of the Progressive Party and finally as a Liberal member.

He was born in London, Ontario, the son of George Cockburn and Margaret Hunter, both natives of Scotland, and was educated in London. He came to Manitoba in 1895 before moving to Saskatchewan. In 1899, Cockburn married Isabel MacHardy. He served as reeve of the Rural Municipality of Great Bend No. 405 and was chairman of the local school board. Cockburn lived in Borden, Saskatchewan.
