= Benjamin Franklin McGregor =

Canadian politician

Benjamin Franklin McGregor (January 1, 1885 – 1935) was a farmer and political figure in Saskatchewan. He represented Gravelbourg from 1925 to 1935 in the Legislative Assembly of Saskatchewan as a Liberal.

He was born in Milton, Ontario, the son of Charles McGregor and Sarah Johnston. He served as reeve of the rural municipality of Whiska Creek and chairman of the local school board. McGregor lived in Vanguard, Saskatchewan. He died in office in 1935.
