= Samuel Wesley Huston =

Canadian politician

Samuel Wesley Huston (October 28, 1873 – May 25, 1933) was a political figure in Saskatchewan. He represented The Battlefords from 1929 to 1933 in the Legislative Assembly of Saskatchewan as an independent member.

He was born in St. Marys, Ontario, the son of Samuel Huston, a native of Ireland, and Jane Adair, and was educated there. In 1908, Huston married Ester May Sproat. Huston and his family came to the East Hill area of Saskatchewan in 1918. He died in office in 1933.
