= John Henry Sturdy =

Canadian educator and politician from Saskatchewan (1893–1966)

John Henry Sturdy (January 27, 1893 – September 20, 1966) was an educator and political figure in Saskatchewan. He represented Saskatoon City from 1944 to 1960 in the Legislative Assembly of Saskatchewan as a Co-operative Commonwealth Federation (CCF) member.

He was born in Goderich, Ontario and came to Saskatoon, Saskatchewan in 1912. Educated at the University of Saskatchewan and the Saskatoon Normal School, he taught school briefly and then served in France with the Canadian Expeditionary Force during World War I. After the war, he farmed for a while and then became a school principal in Fort Qu'Appelle. In 1934, Sturdy was an unsuccessful Farmer-Labour candidate for the Qu'Appelle-Wolseley seat in the provincial assembly. The following year, he was elected to the executive of the Saskatchewan Teachers' Federation. In 1940, he became the overseas assistant director of educational services for the Royal Canadian Legion.

Sturdy served in the provincial cabinet as Minister of Reconstruction and Rehabilitation, as Minister of Social Welfare and as minister without portfolio. In 1956, he chaired the Committee on Indian Affairs, which recommended giving First Nations people in Saskatchewan the rights to vote in provincial elections, to live outside of reserves and to purchase liquor. After retiring from politics in 1960, Sturdy moved to Victoria, British Columbia. He later died there at the age of 73.
