= Edgar Sidney Clinch =

Canadian politician

Edgar Sidney Clinch (August 4, 1866 – 1937) was a farmer, grain dealer, rancher and political figure in Saskatchewan. He represented Shellbrook in the Legislative Assembly of Saskatchewan from 1915 to 1934 as a Liberal.

He was born in Anoka, Minnesota, the son of Edward Stanley Clinch and Anna Brockway, and was educated there. He worked as superintendent for logging operations in Minnesota and then, after coming to Canada in 1906, in northern Saskatchewan. He married Scleda Burnham Sproul. Clinch served as president of the Shellbrook Agricultural Association. He was first elected to the provincial assembly in a 1915 by-election held after Samuel James Donaldson ran for a seat in the Canadian House of Commons.
