= Arthur Thomas Stone =

Canadian politician

Arthur Thomas Stone (October 18, 1897 – December 31, 1988) was an English-born machinist, trade unionist and political figure in Saskatchewan, Canada. He represented Saskatoon City from 1944 to 1964 in the Legislative Assembly of Saskatchewan as a Co-operative Commonwealth Federation (CCF) member.

He was born in Croydon, the son of George Thomas Stone and Jane Webb, and was educated there. Stone migrated to Canada in 1913 and was employed by the Grand Truck Railway (Pacific) which later became part of the Canadian National Railway. He became active in the railroad machinists' union. In 1921, he married Kathleen Walkling. Stone was president of the State Hospital and Medical League, an organization formed in 1936 to lobby for publicly funded healthcare, and played an important role in the implementation of medicare in Saskatchewan. He retired from the railway in 1960 and from politics in 1964.

His daughter, Barbara (Turnbull) Danaher (née Stone), was a noted amateur golfer.
