= List of Saskatchewan by-elections =

The list of Saskatchewan by-elections includes every by-election held in the Canadian province of Saskatchewan. By-elections occur whenever there is a vacancy in the Legislative Assembly, although an imminent general election may allow the vacancy to remain until the dissolution of parliament.

== Causes ==
A by-election occurs whenever there is a vacancy in the Saskatchewan legislature. Vacancies can occur for the following reasons:

- Death of a member.
- Resignation of a member.
- Voided results
- Expulsion from the legislature.
- Ineligibility to sit.
- Appointment to the cabinet. Incumbent members were required to recontest their seats upon being appointed to Cabinet. These Ministerial by-elections were almost always uncontested. This requirement was amended in 1930 to exempt members if they were appointed within six months of a general election. This requirement was abolished completely in 1936.

== 29th Legislative Assembly of Saskatchewan (2020–2024) ==
By-election	Date	Incumbent	Party	Winner	Party	Cause	Retained
Regina Walsh Acres	August 10, 2023	Derek Meyers	Saskatchewan Party	Jared Clarke	New Democratic	Death	No
Lumsden-Morse	August 10, 2023	Lyle Stewart	Saskatchewan Party	Blaine McLeod	Saskatchewan Party	Resignation	Yes
Regina Coronation Park	August 10, 2023	Mark Docherty	Saskatchewan Party	Noor Burki	New Democratic	Resignation	No
Saskatoon Meewasin	September 26, 2022	Ryan Meili	New Democratic	Nathaniel Teed	New Democratic	Resignation	Yes
Athabasca	February 15, 2022	Buckley Belanger	New Democratic	Jim Lemaigre	Saskatchewan Party	Resigned to run federally in Desnethé—Missinippi—Churchill River as a Liberal; defeated.	No

== 28th Legislative Assembly of Saskatchewan (2016–2020) ==
By-election	Date	Incumbent	Party	Winner	Party	Cause	Retained
Regina Northeast	September 12, 2018	Kevin Doherty	Saskatchewan Party	Yens Pedersen	New Democratic	Resignation	No
Swift Current	March 1, 2018	Brad Wall	Saskatchewan Party	Everett Hindley	Saskatchewan Party	Resignation	Yes
Melfort	March 1, 2018	Kevin Phillips	Saskatchewan Party	Todd Goudy	Saskatchewan Party	Death	Yes
Kindersley	March 1, 2018	Bill Boyd	Independent	Ken Francis	Saskatchewan Party	Resignation	No*
Saskatoon Fairview	September 7, 2017	Jennifer Campeau	Saskatchewan Party	Vicki Mowat	New Democratic	Resigned to accept a job with mining company Rio Tinto in British Columbia.	No
Saskatoon Meewasin	March 2, 2017	Roger Parent	Saskatchewan Party	Ryan Meili	New Democratic	Death	No

* Boyd was expelled from Saskatchewan Party caucus due to conflict-of-interest allegations four days before resignation from legislature took effect.

== 27th Legislative Assembly of Saskatchewan (2011–2016) ==
By-election	Date	Incumbent	Party	Winner	Party	Cause	Retained
Lloydminster	November 13, 2014	Tim McMillan	Saskatchewan Party	Colleen Young	Saskatchewan Party	Resignation	Yes

== 26th Legislative Assembly of Saskatchewan (2007–2011) ==
By-election	Date	Incumbent	Party	Winner	Party	Cause	Retained
Saskatoon Northwest	October 18, 2010	Serge LeClerc	Independent	Gordon Wyant	Saskatchewan Party	Resignation	No*
Saskatoon Riversdale	September 21, 2009	Lorne Calvert	New Democratic	Danielle Chartier	New Democratic	Resignation	Yes
Regina Douglas Park	September 21, 2009	Harry Van Mulligen	New Democratic	Dwain Lingenfelter	New Democratic	Resignation to provide a seat for Lingenfelter	Yes
Cumberland	June 25, 2008	Joan Beatty	New Democratic	Doyle Vermette	New Democratic	Resignation to run federally	Yes

*LeClerc was a former member of the Saskatchewan Party

== 25th Legislative Assembly of Saskatchewan (2003–2007) ==
By-election	Date	Incumbent	Party	Winner	Party	Cause	Retained
Martensville	March 5, 2007	Ben Heppner	Saskatchewan Party	Nancy Heppner	Saskatchewan Party	Death	Yes
Weyburn-Big Muddy	June 19, 2006	Brenda Bakken-Lackey	Saskatchewan Party	Dustin Duncan	Saskatchewan Party	Resignation	Yes

== 24th Legislative Assembly of Saskatchewan (1999–2003) ==
By-election	Date	Incumbent	Party	Winner	Party	Cause	Retained
Carrot River Valley	June 26, 2003	Carl Kwiatkowski	Saskatchewan Party	Allan Kerpan	Saskatchewan Party	Death	Yes
Saskatoon Fairview	March 17, 2003	Chris Axworthy	New Democratic	Andy Iwanchuk	New Democratic	Resignation	Yes
Battleford-Cut Knife	March 17, 2003	Rudi Peters	Saskatchewan Party	Wally Lorenz	Saskatchewan Party	Death	Yes
Kindersley	October 4, 2002	Bill Boyd	Saskatchewan Party	Jason Dearborn	Saskatchewan Party	Resignation	Yes
Saskatoon Idylwyld	November 8, 2001	Janice MacKinnon	New Democratic	David Forbes	New Democratic	Resignation	Yes
Saskatoon Riversdale	March 19, 2001	Roy Romanow	New Democratic	Lorne Calvert	New Democratic	Resignation	Yes
Regina Elphinstone	February 26, 2001	Dwain Lingenfelter	New Democratic	Warren McCall	New Democratic	Resignation	Yes
Wood River	June 26, 2000	Glen McPherson	Liberal	Yogi Huyghebaert	Saskatchewan Party	Void Election	No

== 23rd Legislative Assembly of Saskatchewan (1995–1999) ==
By-election	Date	Incumbent	Party	Winner	Party	Cause	Retained
Saskatoon Fairview	June 28, 1999	Bob Mitchell	New Democratic	Chris Axworthy	New Democratic	Resignation	Yes
Regina Dewdney	June 28, 1999	Edwin Tchorzewski	New Democratic	Kevin Yates	New Democratic	Resignation to become Chief of Staff to Alexa McDonough	Yes
Cypress Hills	June 28, 1999	Jack Goohsen	Independent*	Wayne Elhard	Saskatchewan Party	Resignation	No
Athabasca	October 26, 1998	Buckley Belanger	Liberal	Buckley Belanger	New Democratic	Sought reelection upon change of party affiliation	No
Saskatoon Eastview	June 24, 1998	Bob Pringle	New Democratic	Judy Junor	New Democratic	Resignation	Yes
North Battleford	November 19, 1996	Douglas Anguish	New Democratic	Jack Hillson	Liberal	Resignation	No

*Goohsen was a former Progressive Conservative.

== 22nd Legislative Assembly of Saskatchewan (1991–1995) ==
By-election	Date	Incumbent	Party	Winner	Party	Cause	Retained
Regina North West	February 4, 1994	John Solomon	New Democratic	Anita Bergman	Liberal	Resignation to run federally	No

== 21st Legislative Assembly of Saskatchewan (1986–1991) ==
By-election	Date	Incumbent	Party	Winner	Party	Cause	Retained
Assiniboia-Gravelbourg	December 15, 1988	Ralph Goodale	Liberal	John Thomas Wolfe	Progressive Conservative	Resignation to run federally	No
Saskatoon Eastview	May 4, 1988	Pierre Raymond Martineau	Progressive Conservative	Bob Pringle	New Democratic	Resignation	No
Regina Elphinstone	May 4, 1988	Allan Blakeney	New Democratic	Dwain Lingenfelter	New Democratic	Resignation	Yes

== 20th Legislative Assembly of Saskatchewan (1982–1986) ==
By-election	Date	Incumbent	Party	Winner	Party	Cause	Retained
Regina North East	November 25, 1985	Russell Sutor	Progressive Conservative	Edwin Tchorzewski	New Democratic	Resignation	No
Thunder Creek	March 27, 1985	Colin Thatcher	Progressive Conservative	Richard Swenson	Progressive Conservative	Seat declared vacant following Thatcher's conviction for murder	Yes
Prince Albert-Duck Lake	February 21, 1983	Jerome Hammersmith	New Democratic	Sid Dutchak	Progressive Conservative	Void Election	No

== 19th Legislative Assembly of Saskatchewan (1978–1982) ==
By-election	Date	Incumbent	Party	Winner	Party	Cause	Retained
The Battlefords	November 26, 1980	Eiling Kramer	New Democratic	David Manly Miner	New Democratic	Resignation	Yes
Kelsey-Tisdale	November 26, 1980	John Rissler Messer	New Democratic	Neal Herbert Hardy	Progressive Conservative	Resignation	No
Estevan	November 26, 1980	Robert Austin Larter	Progressive Conservative	John Otho Chapman	New Democratic	Resignation (Ill-health)	No
Regina North West	October 17, 1979	Edward Charles Whelan	New Democratic	John Solomon	New Democratic	Resignation	Yes

== 18th Legislative Assembly of Saskatchewan (1975–1978) ==
By-election	Date	Incumbent	Party	Winner	Party	Cause	Retained
Pelly	June 8, 1977	Leonard Larson	New Democratic	Norm Lusney	New Democratic	Death	Yes
Saskatoon Sutherland	March 2, 1977	Evelyn Edwards	Liberal	Harold Lane	Progressive Conservative	Death	No
Prince Albert-Duck Lake	March 2, 1977	David Steuart	Liberal	Garnet Norman Wipf	Progressive Conservative	Appointed to the Senate	No

== 17th Legislative Assembly of Saskatchewan (1971–1975) ==
By-election	Date	Incumbent	Party	Winner	Party	Cause	Retained
Regina Lakeview	December 5, 1973	Donald Mighton McPherson	Liberal	Edward Cyril Malone	Liberal	Death	Yes
Athabasca	September 27, 1972	Allan Ray Guy	Liberal	Allan Ray Guy	Liberal	Void Election	Yes
Souris-Estevan	December 1, 1971	Russell Brown	New Democratic	Kim Thorson	New Democratic	Death	Yes
Morse	December 1, 1971	Ross Thatcher	Liberal	Jack Wiebe	Liberal	Death	Yes

== 16th Legislative Assembly of Saskatchewan (1967–1971) ==
By-election	Date	Incumbent	Party	Winner	Party	Cause	Retained
Kelvington	June 25, 1969	Bryan Harvey Bjarnason	Liberal	Neil Erland Byers	New Democratic	Void Election	No

== 15th Legislative Assembly of Saskatchewan (1964–1967) ==
By-election	Date	Incumbent	Party	Winner	Party	Cause	Retained
Bengough	February 16, 1966	Samuel Karnarvon Asbell	Liberal	Alexander Mitchell	Liberal	Death	Yes
Moosomin	June 30, 1965	Alexander Hamilton McDonald	Liberal	Ernest Franklin Gardner	Liberal	Appointed to the Senate	Yes
Hanley	December 16, 1964	Robert Alexander Walker	CCF-NDP	Robert Alexander Walker	CCF-NDP	Sought reelection having won seat in a judicial recount by two votes	Yes

== 14th Legislative Assembly of Saskatchewan (1960–1964) ==
By-election	Date	Incumbent	Party	Winner	Party	Cause	Retained
Prince Albert	November 14, 1962	Lachlan Fraser McIntosh	CCF-NDP	David Steuart	Liberal	Death	No
Weyburn	December 13, 1961	Tommy Douglas	CCF	Junior Herbert Staveley	Liberal	Resignation upon being elected first leader of the Federal NDP	No
Turtleford	February 22, 1961	Bob Wooff	CCF	Frank Foley	Liberal	Void Election	No

== 13th Legislative Assembly of Saskatchewan (1956–1960) ==
By-election	Date	Incumbent	Party	Winner	Party	Cause	Retained
Kinistino	June 3, 1959	Henry Begrand	CCF	Arthur Thibault	CCF	Death	Yes

== 12th Legislative Assembly of Saskatchewan (1952–1956) ==
By-election	Date	Incumbent	Party	Winner	Party	Cause	Retained
Souris-Estevan	October 28, 1953	John Edward McCormack	Liberal	Robert Kohaly	Progressive Conservative	Death	No
Rosthern	October 28, 1953	Walter Tucker	Liberal	Samuel Henry Carr	Liberal	Resignation to run federally	Yes

== 11th Legislative Assembly of Saskatchewan (1948–1952) ==
By-election	Date	Incumbent	Party	Winner	Party	Cause	Retained
Gravelbourg	July 10, 1951	E. M. Culliton	Liberal	Edward Hazen Walker	CCF	Appointed a judge	No
The Battlefords	February 8, 1950	Paul Prince	Liberal	Hugh James Maher	Liberal	Death	Yes
Gull Lake	November 10, 1949	Alvin Cecil Murray	CCF	Thomas John Bentley	CCF	Death	Yes
Cannington	November 10, 1949	William John Patterson	Liberal	Rosscoe Arnold McCarthy	Liberal	Resignation upon appointment to the federal Board of Transport Commissioners	Yes

== 10th Legislative Assembly of Saskatchewan (1944–1948) ==
By-election	Date	Incumbent	Party	Winner	Party	Cause	Retained
Morse	June 27, 1946	Sidney Merlin Spidell	CCF	James William Gibson	CCF	Resignation	Yes
Wadena	November 21, 1945	George Hara Williams	CCF	Frederick Arthur Dewhurst	CCF	Death	Yes
Shellbrook	June 29, 1945	Albert Victor Sterling	CCF	Guy Franklin Van Eaton	CCF	Death	Yes

== 9th Legislative Assembly of Saskatchewan (1938–1944) ==
By-election	Date	Incumbent	Party	Winner	Party	Cause	Retained
Athabasca	July 28, 1941†	Jules Marion	Liberal	Hubert Staines	Liberal	Death	Yes
The Battlefords	June 26, 1940	John Gregory	Liberal	Paul Prince	Liberal	Resignation to run federally	Yes
Prince Albert	October 16, 1939†	Thomas Clayton Davis	Liberal	Harold John Fraser	Liberal	Appointed a judge	Yes
Regina City	November 24, 1938	Percy McCuaig Anderson	Liberal	Bernard J. McDaniel	Liberal	Appointed a judge	Yes
Humboldt	August 4, 1938	James Chisholm King	Liberal	Joseph William Burton	CCF	Resignation to provide a seat for CM Dunn	No

† Won by acclamation

== 8th Legislative Assembly of Saskatchewan (1934–1938) ==
By-election	Date	Incumbent	Party	Winner	Party	Cause	Retained
Melville	December 9, 1935†	James Garfield Gardiner	Liberal	Ernest Walter Gerrand	Liberal	Appointed to the federal cabinet	Yes
Regina City	December 2, 1935	William Franklin Kerr	Liberal	William Franklin Kerr	Liberal	Sought reelection upon appointment as Minister of Natural Resources	Yes
Gravelbourg	November 26, 1935	Benjamin Franklin McGregor	Liberal	E. M. Culliton	Liberal	Death	Yes
Humboldt	November 19, 1935	James Hogan	Liberal	James Chisholm King	Liberal	Death	Yes

† Won by acclamation

== 7th Legislative Assembly of Saskatchewan (1929–1934) ==
By-election	Date	Incumbent	Party	Winner	Party	Cause	Retained
Kinistino	May 22, 1933	Charles McIntosh	Liberal	John Richard Parish Taylor	Liberal	Sought reelection upon appointment as Minister of Natural Resources	Yes*
Estevan	December 23, 1930	Eleazer Garner	Liberal	David McKnight	Conservative	Resignation	No
Estevan	December 23, 1930	David McKnight	Conservative	Norman Leslie McLeod	Liberal	McLeod declared elected due to ballot tampering on February 9, 1931. Results Voided November 7, 1932. No by-election held.	No
Yorkton	October 7, 1929†	Alan Carl Stewart	Independent	Alan Carl Stewart	Independent	Sought reelection upon appointment as Minister of Highways	Yes
Tisdale	October 7, 1929†	Walter Clutterbuck Buckle	Conservative	Walter Clutterbuck Buckle	Conservative	Sought reelection upon appointment as Minister of Agriculture	Yes
Moosomin	October 7, 1929†	Frederick Dennis Munroe	Conservative	Frederick Dennis Munroe	Conservative	Sought reelection upon appointment as Minister of Public Health	Yes
Saskatoon City	September 30, 1929†	James Thomas Milton Anderson	Conservative	James Thomas Milton Anderson	Conservative	Sought reelection upon appointment as Premier and Minister of Education and Natural Resources	Yes
Saskatoon City	September 30, 1929†	Howard McConnell	Conservative	Howard McConnell	Conservative	Sought reelection upon appointment as Provincial Treasurer and Minister of Municipal Affairs	Yes
Regina City	September 30, 1929†	Murdoch Alexander MacPherson	Conservative	Murdoch Alexander MacPherson	Conservative	Sought reelection upon appointment as Attorney General	Yes
Moose Jaw City	September 30, 1929†	John Alexander Merkley	Conservative	John Alexander Merkley	Conservative	Sought reelection upon appointment as Provincial Secretary and Minister of Railways, Labour and Industries	Yes
Lumsden	September 30, 1929†	James Fraser Bryant	Conservative	James Fraser Bryant	Conservative	Sought reelection upon appointment as Minister of Public Works and Minister of Telephones and Telegraphs	Yes

† Won by acclamation

*McIntosh was a Liberal who became a coalition government supporter in 1932 and was defeated when he sought reelection upon entering the cabinet

== 6th Legislative Assembly of Saskatchewan (1925–1929) ==
By-election	Date	Incumbent	Party	Winner	Party	Cause	Retained
Arm River	October 25, 1928	George Adam Scott	Liberal	Thomas Frederick Waugh	Liberal	Resignation upon appointment as an income tax inspector	Yes
Maple Creek	December 1, 1927	Peter Lawrence Hyde	Liberal	George Spence	Liberal	Resignation	Yes
Morse	August 15, 1927†	William Paris MacLachlan	Liberal	Duncan Morris Robertson	Liberal	Death	Yes
Moose Jaw City	May 17, 1927	William Erskine Knowles	Liberal	William Gladstone Ross	Liberal	Appointed a judge	Yes
Saskatoon City	January 21, 1927	Archibald Peter McNab	Liberal	Howard McConnell	Conservative	Appointed to the local government board	No
Kerrobert	November 9, 1926	John Albert Dowd	Liberal	Donald Laing	Liberal	Resignation	Yes
Notukeu	June 1, 1926	George Spence	Liberal	Alexander Lothian Grant	Liberal	Resignation to run federally	Yes
Moose Jaw County	May 25, 1926†	Charles Avery Dunning	Liberal	Thomas Waddell	Liberal	Resignation to run federally	Yes
Île-à-la-Crosse	April 26, 1926	Joseph Nolin	Liberal	Jules Marion	Liberal	Death	Yes
Prince Albert	March 18, 1926†	Thomas Clayton Davis	Liberal	Thomas Clayton Davis	Liberal	Sought reelection upon appointment as Minister of Municipal Affairs	Yes
Pipestone	March 18, 1926†	William John Patterson	Liberal	William John Patterson	Liberal	Sought reelection upon appointment as Provincial Treasurer	Yes
Willow Bunch	August 31, 1925†	Abel James Hindle	Liberal	James Albert Cross	Liberal	Resignation to provide a seat for Cross	Yes

† Won by acclamation

== 5th Legislative Assembly of Saskatchewan (1921–1925) ==
By-election	Date	Incumbent	Party	Winner	Party	Cause	Retained
Wynyard	October 20, 1924	George Wilson Robertson	Independent	Wilhelm Paulson	Liberal	Resignation to become Secretary of the Saskatchewan Wheat Pool	No
Cannington	June 9, 1924†	Robert Douglas	Liberal	Albert Edward Steele	Liberal	Death	Yes
Milestone	October 29, 1923	Bernard Larson	Liberal	Frederick Birthall Lewis	Liberal	Death	Yes
Regina City	September 19, 1922†	William Melville Martin	Liberal	Donald McNiven	Liberal	Appointed a judge	Yes
Cumberland	August 21, 1922	George Langley	Liberal	Deakin Hall	Liberal	Resignation	Yes
Happyland	June 26, 1922	Stephen Morrey	Liberal	Franklin Robert Shortreed	Liberal	Death	Yes
Rosthern	June 5, 1922†	John Michael Uhrich	Liberal	John Michael Uhrich	Liberal	Sought reelection upon appointment as Provincial Secretary	Yes
North Qu'Appelle	June 5, 1922†	James Garfield Gardiner	Liberal	James Garfield Gardiner	Liberal	Sought reelection upon appointment as Minister of Highways	Yes
Regina City	April 25, 1922†	James Albert Cross	Liberal	James Albert Cross	Liberal	Sought reelection upon appointment as Attorney General	Yes

† Won by acclamation

== 4th Legislative Assembly of Saskatchewan (1917–1921) ==
By-election	Date	Incumbent	Party	Winner	Party	Cause	Retained
Weyburn	June 15, 1920†	Charles McGill Hamilton	Liberal	Charles McGill Hamilton	Liberal	Sought reelection upon appointment as Minister of Agriculture	Yes
Kindersley	November 13, 1919†	William Richard Motherwell	Liberal	Wesley Harper Harvey	Independent Farmer	Resignation in protest of the Liberals pro-conscription stance	No
Pelly	July 29, 1919	Max Ramsland	Liberal	Sarah Ramsland	Liberal	Death	Yes
Weyburn	July 22, 1919†	Robert Menzies Mitchell	Liberal	Charles McGill Hamilton	Liberal	Resignation to become superintendent of the provincial mental hospital	Yes
Estevan	October 24, 1918	George Alexander Bell	Liberal	Robert Dunbar	Liberal	Resignation to become chairman of the Local Government Board	Yes
Saltcoats	July 11, 1918	James Alexander Calder	Liberal	George William Sahlmark	Liberal	Resignation to run federally	Yes
Moose Jaw City	June 10, 1918	Wellington Willoughby	Conservative	William Erskine Knowles	Liberal	Appointed to the Senate	No
Last Mountain	November 6, 1917†	Samuel John Latta	Liberal	Samuel John Latta	Liberal	Sought reelection upon appointment as Minister of Highways	Yes

† Won by acclamation

== 3rd Legislative Assembly of Saskatchewan (1912–1917) ==
By-election	Date	Incumbent	Party	Winner	Party	Cause	Retained
Moose Jaw County	December 5, 1916	John Albert Sheppard	Liberal	John Edwin Chisholm	Conservative	Sought reelection in order to "give him the opportunity of vindicating his character by an appeal to the people"	No
Regina City	November 13, 1916†	James Franklin Bole	Liberal	William Melville Martin	Liberal	Appointed Saskatchewan liquor commissioner	Yes
Kinistino	November 13, 1916†	Edward Devline	Liberal	Charles Avery Dunning	Liberal	Resignation upon conviction for forgery	Yes
Shellbrook	May 10, 1915	Samuel James Donaldson	Conservative	Edgar Sidney Clinch	Liberal	Resignation to run federally	No
Rosthern	June 25, 1914	Gerhard Ens	Liberal	William Benjamin Bashford	Liberal	Resignation to become Inspector of Public Institutions	Yes
North Qu'Appelle	June 25, 1914	John Archibald McDonald	Conservative	James Garfield Gardiner	Liberal	Resignation after admitting to "corrupt practices on the part of his agent"	No
Cumberland	September 8, 1913	Vacant	n/a	Deakin Hall	Liberal	Void Election	n/a
Hanley	June 28, 1913	James Walter MacNeill	Liberal	Macbeth Malcolm	Liberal	Resignation to travel abroad and study mental diseases	Yes
South Qu'Appelle	December 4, 1912	Frederick W. A. G. Haultain	Conservative	Joseph Glenn	Conservative	Appointed a judge	Yes
Redberry	September 5, 1912†	George Langley	Liberal	George Langley	Liberal	Sought reelection upon appointment as Minister of Municipal Affairs	Yes
Estevan	September 5, 1912†	George Alexander Bell	Liberal	George Alexander Bell	Liberal	Sought reelection upon appointment as Provincial Treasurer	Yes

† Won by acclamation

== 2nd Legislative Assembly of Saskatchewan (1908–1912) ==
By-election	Date	Incumbent	Party	Winner	Party	Cause	Retained
Saskatoon City	December 24, 1908†	Archibald Peter McNab	Liberal	Archibald Peter McNab	Liberal	Sought reelection upon appointment as Commissioner of Municipal Affairs	Yes
Saltcoats	December 7, 1908	Thomas MacNutt	Liberal	James Alexander Calder	Liberal	Resignation to run federally	Yes
Humboldt	December 7, 1908	David Bradley Neely	Liberal	William Richard Motherwell	Liberal	Resignation to run federally	Yes

† Won by acclamation

== 1st Legislative Assembly of Saskatchewan (1905–1908) ==
By-election	Date	Incumbent	Party	Winner	Party	Cause	Retained
Prince Albert City	October 12, 1907	John Henderson Lamont	Liberal	William Ferdinand Alphonse Turgeon	Liberal	Appointed a judge	Yes

== See also ==
- List of federal by-elections in Canada
