= 2nd Saskatchewan Legislature =

The 2nd Legislative Assembly of Saskatchewan was elected in the Saskatchewan general election held in August 1908. The assembly sat from December 10, 1908, to June 15, 1912. The Liberal Party led by Walter Scott formed the government. The Provincial Rights Party led by Frederick Haultain formed the official opposition.

William Charles Sutherland served as speaker for the assembly.

== Members of the Assembly ==
The following members were elected to the assembly in 1908:

Electoral district	Member	Party	First elected / previously elected	No.# of term(s)
Arm River	George Adam Scott	Liberal	1908	1st term
Athabasca	Joseph Octave Nolin	Liberal	1908	1st term
Battleford	Sydney Seymour Simpson	Liberal	1908	1st term
Cannington	John Duncan Stewart	Liberal	1905	2nd term
Canora	John Duff Robertson	Liberal	1908	1st term
Duck Lake	William Ferdinand Alphonse Turgeon	Liberal	1907	2nd term
Estevan	George Alexander Bell	Liberal	1908	1st term
Francis	John James Stevenson	Liberal	1908	1st term
Hanley	James Walter MacNeill	Liberal	1908	1st term
Humboldt	David Bradley Neely	Liberal	1905	2nd term
Humboldt	William Richard Motherwell (1908)	Liberal	1905, (Note: North Qu'Appelle) 1908	2nd term*
Kinistino	George Balfour Johnston	Provincial Rights	1908	1st term
Last Mountain	Thomas Arnold Anderson	Provincial Rights	1908	1st term
Lloydminster	Henry Claud Lisle	Liberal	1908	1st term
Maple Creek	David James Wylie	Provincial Rights	1905	2nd term
Milestone	Albert Eugene Whitmore	Provincial Rights	1908	1st term
Moose Jaw City	John Henry Wellington	Provincial Rights	1905	2nd term
Moose Jaw County	John Albert Sheppard	Liberal	1905	2nd term
Moose Mountain	William Elliot	Provincial Rights	1905	2nd term
Moosomin	Alexander Smith Smith	Liberal	1908	1st term
North Battleford	Donald M. Finlayson	Liberal	1908	1st term
North Qu'Appelle	John Archibald McDonald	Provincial Rights	1908	1st term
Pelly	John Kenneth Johnston	Liberal	1908	1st term
Pheasant Hills	Henry Hayes Willway	Provincial Rights	1908	1st term
Pipestone	Archibald Beaton Gillis	Provincial Rights	1905	2nd term
Prince Albert City	John Ernest Bradshaw	Provincial Rights	1908	1st term
Prince Albert County	Samuel James Donaldson	Provincial Rights	1907	2nd term
Redberry	George Langley	Liberal	1905	2nd term
Regina City	James Franklin Bole	Liberal	1905	2nd term
Regina County	Frederick Clarke Tate	Provincial Rights	1908	1st term
Rosthern	Gerhard Ens	Liberal	1905	2nd term
Saltcoats	Thomas MacNutt	Liberal	1905	2nd term
Saltcoats	James Alexander Calder (1908)	Liberal	1905, (Note: South Regina) 1908	2nd term*
Saskatoon City	Archibald Peter McNab	Liberal	1908	1st term
Saskatoon County	William Charles Sutherland	Liberal	1905	2nd term
Souris	Archibald W. Riddell	Provincial Rights	1908	1st term
South Qu'Appelle	Frederick William Gordon Haultain	Provincial Rights	1905	2nd term
Swift Current	Walter Scott	Liberal	1905	2nd term
Touchwood	George Maitland Atkinson	Liberal	1908	1st term
Vonda	Albert Frederick Totzke	Liberal	1908	1st term
Wadena	Herbert Chandler Pierce	Liberal	1908	1st term
Weyburn	Robert Menzies Mitchell	Liberal	1908	1st term
Yorkton	Thomas Henry Garry	Liberal	1905	2nd term

== Party Standings ==
Affiliation	Members
Liberal	27
Provincial Rights	14
Total	41
Government Majority	13

== By-elections ==
By-elections were held to replace members for various reasons:

Electoral district	Member elected	Party	Election date	Reason
Humboldt	William Richard Motherwell	Liberal	December 7, 1908	David Bradley Neely resigned his seat to run for a House of Commons seat
Saltcoats	James Alexander Calder	Liberal	December 7, 1908	Thomas MacNutt resigned his seat to run for a House of Commons seat
Saskatoon City	Archibald Peter McNab	Liberal	December 24, 1908	McNab resigned his seat after being named to cabinet and was reelected by acclamation
