= William George Baker =

Canadian politician

William George Baker (January 16, 1885 – April 9, 1960) was a railway conductor and political figure in Saskatchewan. He represented Moose Jaw City in the Legislative Assembly of Saskatchewan from 1921 to 1929 as a Labour and then Liberal-Labour member and then from 1938 to 1944 as a Liberal.

He was born in Owen Sound, Ontario, and was the son of Wesley Baker and Mary McTavish. William George Baker was educated in his birthplace of Owen Sound, Ontario. In 1912, Baker married Pearl Green. He worked for the Canadian Pacific Railway as a conductor. Baker ran unsuccessfully for a seat in the provincial assembly in 1917 and in a 1918 by-election before being elected in 1921. He was defeated when he ran for reelection in 1929, 1934 and 1944.

== Electoral results (partial) ==
1925 Saskatchewan general election: Moose Jaw City
Party	Candidate	Votes	%	Elected
Labour–Liberal	William George Baker	4,704	32.83%	✓
Liberal	William Erskine Knowles	4,095	28.58%	✓
Conservative	James Pascoe	2,809	19.60%	
Conservative	Netson Ross Craig	2,722	18.99%	
Total		14,330	100.00%	

1934 Saskatchewan general election: Moose Jaw City
Party	Candidate	Votes	%	Elected
Liberal	William Gladstone Ross	4,928	25.55%	✓
Liberal	John Houston Laird	4,403	22.83%	✓
Conservative	John Alexander Merkley	2,440	12.65%	
Conservative	James W. Hawthorne	2,319	12.02%	
Farmer–Labour	Waldo D. Summers	2,013	10.44%	
Farmer–Labour	Hugh Gordon	1,765	9.15%	
Labour	William George Baker	1,420	7.36%	
Total		19,288	100.00%	
