= Lloyd Emmett Johnson =

Canadian politician

MLA for Turtleford Shellbrook-Spiritwood (1995-1999)
- In office 1975–1982
- Preceded by: Michael Feduniak
- Succeeded by: Colin Maxwell

Personal details
- Born: January 22, 1945 (age 81) North Battleford, Saskatchewan
- Party: Saskatchewan New Democratic Party
- Occupation: farmer

Lloyd Emmett Johnson (born January 22, 1945) was a Canadian politician. He served in the Legislative Assembly of Saskatchewan from 1975 to 1982, as a NDP member for the constituency of Turtleford. He is a farmer.

He also represented Shellbrook-Spiritwood from 1995 to 1999.
