= Deakin Hall (politician) =

Canadian politician (1884–1957)

Deakin Alexander Hall (September 25, 1884 – July 16, 1957) was a politician from Saskatchewan, Canada.

Deakin was a long-standing member of the Legislative Assembly of Saskatchewan serving for the Saskatchewan Liberal Party from 1913 to 1944.

Preceded by New District	MLA Cumberland; 1913-1921	Succeeded by George Langley
Preceded by George Langley	MLA Cumberland; 1922-1934; 1938-1944	Succeeded by Leslie Walter Lee
Preceded by Joseph Nolin	MLA Athabasca; 1934-1938	Succeeded by Jules Marion
