= Charles McGill Hamilton =

Canadian politician (1878–1952)

Charles McGill Hamilton (January 17, 1878 – May 3, 1952) was a farmer and political figure in Saskatchewan. He represented Weyburn in the Legislative Assembly of Saskatchewan from 1919 to 1929 as a Liberal.

He was born in Whitechurch, Ontario, and came to Saskatchewan with his family in 1895. Hamilton taught school for four years and then, in 1901, he settled on a homestead near Weyburn. He was president of the local chapter of the Saskatchewan Grain Growers Association and of the Saskatchewan Association of Regional Municipalities. Hamilton was for a short time a director for the Canadian National Railway.

He was first elected to the provincial assembly in a 1919 by-election held after Robert Menzies Mitchell resigned his seat. Hamilton served in the provincial cabinet as Minister of Agriculture, Minister of Municipal Affairs, Minister of Highways, and Minister of the Child Welfare Act. He was defeated by Robert Sterritt Leslie when he ran for reelection to the assembly in 1929. He then served on the Board of Grain Commissioners for 19 years, retiring in January 1948. He died in Winnipeg at the age of 74.
