= Charles Ayre =

Charles Ayre may refer to:

- Charles R. Ayre (1819–1889), English-born merchant and political figure in Newfoundland
- Charles Arthur Ayre (1890–1974), English-born merchant, civil official and political figure in Saskatchewan
