= Charles William Johnson =

Canadian politician

Charles William Johnson MLA

Member of the Saskatchewan Legislative Assembly for Willow Bunch
- In office 1929–1944
- Preceded by: James Albert Cross
- Succeeded by: Niles Leonard Buchanan

Personal details
- Born: May 19, 1891 East Lexham, Norfolk, England
- Died: April 10, 1985 (aged 93) Victoria, British Columbia, Canada
- Party: Liberal Party

Charles William Johnson (May 19, 1891 – April 10, 1985) was a Canadian politician from the province of Saskatchewan.

== Political career ==
Johnson was elected in Willow Bunch at the 1929 Saskatchewan general election as a Liberal. He was re-elected in 1934.

When his constituency was abolished in 1938, he sat for Notukeu-Willow Bunch until 1944

== Electoral record ==
1929 Saskatchewan general election: Willow Bunch electoral district
Party	Candidate	Votes	%	±%
Liberal	Charles William Johnson	4,423	50.61%	-
Conservative	William James Gibbins	4,316	49.39%	-
Total		8,739	100.00%	

1934 Saskatchewan general election: Willow Bunch electoral district
Party	Candidate	Votes	%	±%
Liberal	Charles William Johnson	2,448	47.88%	-2.73
Conservative	Edgar B. Linnell	1,445	28.27%	-21.12
Farmer-Labour	Charles Morley W. Emery	1,219	23.85%	–
Total		5,112	100.00%	

1938 Saskatchewan general election: Notukeu-Willow Bunch
Party	Candidate	Votes	%	±%
Liberal	Charles William Johnson	3,659	48.03%	–
CCF	John E. Lidgett	2,859	37.53%	–
Social Credit	George W.S. Eisnor	1,100	14.44%	–
Total		7,618	100.00%	
