= Lorne Hepworth =

Canadian politician

Lorne Henry Hepworth CM SOM (born December 20, 1947) is a farmer, veterinarian and former political figure in Saskatchewan, Canada. He represented Weyburn from 1982 to 1991 in the Legislative Assembly of Saskatchewan as a Progressive Conservative.

He was born in Assiniboia, Saskatchewan and studied veterinary medicine at the University of Saskatchewan. In 1970, he married Fern Presber. Hepworth operated a farm near Assiniboia and was a veterinarian in Weyburn. He served in the provincial cabinet as Minister of Public Participation, as Minister of Agriculture, as Minister of Energy and Mines, as Minister of Advanced Education and Manpower, as Minister of Education and as Minister of Finance. He was defeated by Ronald Wormsbecker when he ran for reelection to the Saskatchewan assembly in 1991.

Hepworth was previously the president of CropLife Canada and is a former chair of the board of Genome Canada. He lives in London, Ontario.

Hepworth was appointed to the Saskatchewan Order of Merit in 2020.

He was appointed as a Member of the Order of Canada in 2023.
