= Joseph Victor Patterson =

Canadian politician

Joseph Victor Patterson (July 12, 1882 – 1968) was a farmer and political figure in Saskatchewan. He represented Milestone in the Legislative Assembly of Saskatchewan from 1929 to 1934 as an independent member.

He was born in Paisley, Ontario, the son of Hugh Patterson and Mary Ann Herron, both natives of Ireland, and was educated there. In 1907, Patterson married Mary A. McRorie. He was a director of the Saskatchewan Grain Growers' Association. Patterson lived in Hearne, Saskatchewan. He was an unsuccessful candidate as a Progressive for a seat in the provincial assembly in a by-election held in 1923. He later won the seat of Milestone in the 1929 election running as an independent. Patterson was defeated by William Pedersen when he ran for reelection in 1934 as a Conservative.
