= Colin Maxwell =

Colin Maxwell may refer to:

- Col Maxwell (1917–2001), Australian rugby player
- Colin Maxwell (politician) (1943-2018), politician in Saskatchewan, Canada
