= Dempster Heming =

Canadian politician

Dempster Henry Ratcliffe Heming (November 30, 1885 – April 20, 1967) was an English-born political figure in Saskatchewan. He represented Moose Jaw City from 1944 to 1960 in the Legislative Assembly of Saskatchewan as a Co-operative Commonwealth Federation (CCF) member.

He was born in London and was educated at Westminster School and King's College London. Heming came to Canada in 1905, settling on a homestead near Arcola, Saskatchewan. He was also working for the Canadian Pacific Railway at the same time and sold his farm in 1912 to become a full-time employee of the railway at Moose Jaw. He helped organize the Labour Representative League there in 1916, which led to the election of William George Baker to the provincial assembly in 1921. Heming was elected to Moose Jaw City Council in 1937, serving until 1947. He retired from politics in 1960 and died in Moose Jaw at the age of 81.
