= Allan Ray Guy =

Canadian politician (1926–2025)

The Honourable Allan R. Guy ECS

Member of the Saskatchewan Legislative Assembly for Athabasca
- In office 1960–1975
- Preceded by: John James Harrop
- Succeeded by: Frederick John Thompson

Personal details
- Born: May 18, 1926 Senlac, Saskatchewan, Canada
- Died: July 12, 2025 (aged 99)
- Party: Saskatchewan Liberal Party
- Education: University of Saskatchewan
- Profession: educator

Allan Ray Guy (May 18, 1926 – July 12, 2025) was a Canadian educator and politician in Saskatchewan. He represented Athabasca from 1960 to 1975 in the Legislative Assembly of Saskatchewan as a Liberal. After leaving politics in 1975, Guy became principal at Prud'Homme Central School.

== Background ==
Guy was born on May 18, 1926 and educated in Senlac, Saskatchewan, the son of John Guy. He worked on the family farm. Guy continued his studies at the Saskatoon Teacher's College and the University of Saskatchewan. He taught school for several years and then was school principal in La Ronge. Guy was married twice: first to Sylvia Evangeline Harach in 1951 and then to Marjorie Hastings in 1967. He died on July 12, 2025, at the age of 99.

== Political career ==
Guy served in the provincial cabinet as Minister of Public Works, as Minister of Municipal Affairs and as Minister of Indian and Métis Affairs. His election in 1971 was overturned after a judicial recount but he won the by-election that followed in 1972. Guy was an unsuccessful candidate for the Rosthern seat in the provincial assembly in 1975, losing to Ralph Katzman.
