= Weyburn (provincial electoral district) =

Former provincial electoral district in Saskatchewan, Canada

Weyburn was a former provincial electoral district for the Legislative Assembly of the Canadian province of Saskatchewan, from 1908 to 1995. The district was created for the second Saskatchewan general election in 1908. It contained the town of Weyburn and extended into the surrounding countryside.

The district was dissolved in the redistribution following the 1991 federal census. It was combined with parts of the Bengough-Milestone district to become Weyburn-Big Muddy, for the 1995 general election. From 1944 to 1961, Premier Tommy Douglas was the Member of the Legislative Assembly for the Weyburn riding.

== Members of the Legislative Assembly ==
Members of the Legislative Assembly for Weyburn, 1908–1995
#	Member	Years served	Party
1.	Robert Menzies Mitchell	1908–1919	Liberal
2.	Charles McGill Hamilton	1919–1929	Liberal
3.	Robert Sterritt Leslie	1929-1934	Progressive
4.	Hugh Elliott Eaglesham	1934–1938	Liberal
5.	George Levi Crane	1938-1944	Liberal
6.	Tommy Douglas	1944–1961	Co-operative Commonwealth Federation
7.	Junior Herbert Staveley	1961–1964	Liberal
8.	James Auburn Pepper	1964–1982	Co-operative Commonwealth Federation / New Democratic Party
9.	Lorne Henry Hepworth	1982-1991	Progressive Conservative
10.	Ronald Wormsbecker	1991-1995	New Democratic Party
Source: Saskatchewan Archives: Election Results by Electoral Division

== Election results ==
=== 1908 ===
1908 Saskatchewan general election
Party	Candidate	Popular vote	%
Liberal	Yes Robert Menzies Mitchell	760	50.9%
Provincial Rights	George Beischel	732	49.1%
Total		1,492	100.0%
Source: Saskatchewan Archives - Election Results by Electoral Division - Weyburn

Yes Elected.

=== 1912 ===
1912 Saskatchewan general election
Party	Candidate	Popular vote	%
Liberal	Yes X Robert Menzies Mitchell	1,433	61.3%
Conservative	Ormond Skinner Mitchell	904	38.7%
Total		2,337	100.0%
Source: Saskatchewan Archives - Election Results by Electoral Division - Weyburn

Yes Elected.
X Incumbent.

=== 1917 ===
1917 Saskatchewan general election
Party	Candidate	Popular vote	%
Liberal	Yes X Robert Menzies Mitchell	2,619	59.0%
Conservative	George McKenzie Bowman	1,820	41.0%
Total		4,439	100.0%
Source: Saskatchewan Archives - Election Results by Electoral Division - Weyburn

Yes Elected.
X Incumbent.

=== 1919 by-election ===
July 22, 1919 by-election
Party	Candidate	Popular vote	%
Liberal	Yes Charles McGill Hamilton	Acclaimed	–
Total		–	–
Source: Saskatchewan Archives - Election Results by Electoral Division - Weyburn

The by-election was called when the incumbent, Robert Menzies Mitchell, resigned to take the position of superintendent of the Saskatchewan Hospital in Weyburn.
Yes Elected.

=== 1920 by-election ===
June 25, 1920 by-election,
Party	Candidate	Popular vote	%
Liberal	Yes X Charles McGill Hamilton	Acclaimed	–
Total		–	–
Source: Saskatchewan Archives - Election Results by Electoral Division - Weyburn

The by-election was called when Hamilton accepted the position of Minister of Agriculture in the Cabinet of Premier Martin, an office of profit under the Crown, on April 26, 1920.
Yes Elected.
X Incumbent.

=== 1921 ===
1921 Saskatchewan general election
Party	Candidate	Popular vote	%
Liberal	Yes X Charles McGill Hamilton	2,368	88.4%
Independent	Thompson McClelland	311	11.6%
Total		2,679	100.0%
Source: Saskatchewan Archives - Election Results by Electoral Division - Weyburn

Yes Elected.
X Incumbent.

=== 1925 ===
1925 Saskatchewan general election
Party	Candidate	Popular vote	%
Liberal	Yes X Charles McGill Hamilton	2,351	59.6%
Conservative	Morton Allison Fletcher	1,593	40.4%
Total		3,944	100.0%
Source: Saskatchewan Archives - Election Results by Electoral Division - Weyburn

Yes Elected.
X Incumbent.

=== 1929 ===
1929 Saskatchewan general election
Party	Candidate	Popular vote	%
Progressive	Yes Robert Sterritt Leslie	3,288	51.6%
Liberal	X Charles McGill Hamilton	3,088	48.4%
Total		6,376	100.0%
Source: Saskatchewan Archives - Election Results by Electoral Division - Weyburn

Yes Elected.
X Incumbent.

=== 1934 ===
1934 Saskatchewan general election
Party	Candidate	Popular vote	%
Liberal	Yes Hugh Elliott Eaglesham	2,281	43.9%
Progressive	X Robert Sterritt Leslie	1,544	29.7%
Farmer–Labour	Tommy Douglas	1,343	25.8%
Independent	James Logan Coltart	29	0.6%
Total		5,197	100.0%
Source: Saskatchewan Archives - Election Results by Electoral Division - Weyburn

Yes Elected.
X Incumbent.

=== 1938 ===
1938 Saskatchewan general election
Party	Candidate	Popular vote	%
Liberal	Yes George Levi Crane	4,744	48.7%
Co-operative Commonwealth Federation	Frederick Claude Williams	4,167	42.8%
Independent Conservative	John Charles Burnside	828	8.5%
Total		9,739	100.0%
Source: Saskatchewan Archives - Election Results by Electoral Division - Weyburn

Yes Elected.
X Incumbent.

=== 1944 ===
1944 Saskatchewan general election
Party	Candidate	Popular vote	%
Co-operative Commonwealth Federation	Yes Tommy Douglas	5,605	61.6%
Liberal	James Weyburn Adolphe	3,489	38.4%
Total		9,094	100.0%
Source: Saskatchewan Archives - Election Results by Electoral Division - Weyburn

Yes Elected.

=== 1948 ===
1948 Saskatchewan general election
Party	Candidate	Popular vote	%
Co-operative Commonwealth Federation	Yes X Tommy Douglas	6,273	56.3%
Liberal-Progressive Conservative	Fergus Charles Eaglesham	4,228	38.0%
Social Credit	Isabel Paxman	638	5.7%
Total		11,139	100.0%
Source: Saskatchewan Archives - Election Results by Electoral Division - Weyburn

Yes Elected.
X Incumbent.

=== 1952 ===
1952 Saskatchewan general election
Party	Candidate	Popular vote	%
Co-operative Commonwealth Federation	Yes X Tommy Douglas	6,020	59.9%
Liberal	Donald Morrow	4,037	40.1%
Total		10,057	100.0%
Source: Saskatchewan Archives - Election Results by Electoral Division - Weyburn

Yes Elected.
X Incumbent.

=== 1956 ===
1956 Saskatchewan general election
Party	Candidate	Popular vote	%
Co-operative Commonwealth Federation	Yes X Tommy Douglas	4,930	48.2%
Liberal	Junior Herbert Staveley	4,234	41.4%
Social Credit	Gustav Theodore Froese	1,070	10.5%
Total		10,234	100.1%^{1}
Source: Saskatchewan Archives - Election Results by Electoral Division - Weyburn

Yes Elected.
X Incumbent.
^{1} Rounding error.

=== 1960 ===
1960 Saskatchewan general election
Party	Candidate	Popular vote	%
Co-operative Commonwealth Federation	Yes X Tommy Douglas	5,054	48.4%
Liberal	Junior Herbert Staveley	4,453	42.7%
Progressive Conservative	Hugh McGillivray	621	6.0%
Social Credit	William Tabor	307	2.9%
Total		10,435	100.0%^{1}
Source: Saskatchewan Archives - Election Results by Electoral Division - Weyburn

Yes Elected.
X Incumbent.
^{1} Rounding error.

=== 1961 by-election ===
December 13, 1961 by-election
Party	Candidate	Popular vote	%
Liberal	Yes Junior Herbert Staveley	5,379	54.4%
Co-operative Commonwealth Federation	Oran Reiman	4,505	45.6%
Total		9,884	100.0%
Source: Saskatchewan Archives - Election Results by Electoral Division - Weyburn

The by-election was called when the incumbent, Premier Douglas, resigned from the provincial Legislative Assembly to enter federal politics.
Yes Elected.

=== 1964 ===
1964 Saskatchewan general election
Party	Candidate	Popular vote	%
Co-operative Commonwealth Federation	Yes James Auburn Pepper	4,453	44.4%
Liberal	X Junior Herbert Staveley	4,347	43.3%
Progressive Conservative	Jean Benson	1,234	12.3%
Total		10,034	100.0%
Source: Saskatchewan Archives - Election Results by Electoral Division - Weyburn

Yes Elected.
X Incumbent.

=== 1967 ===
1967 Saskatchewan general election
Party	Candidate	Popular vote	%
New Democratic Party	Yes X James Auburn Pepper	4,876	46.7%
Liberal	Junior Herbert Staveley	4,693	45.0%
Progressive Conservative	Jean Benson	865	8.3%
Total		10,434	100.0%
Source: Saskatchewan Archives - Election Results by Electoral Division - Weyburn

Yes Elected.
X Incumbent.

=== 1971 ===
1971 Saskatchewan general election
Party	Candidate	Popular vote	%
New Democratic Party	Yes X James Auburn Pepper	5,795	56.0%
Liberal	William Erle Roger	3,837	37.1%
Progressive Conservative	Ray L. Bailey	719	6.9%
Total		10,351	100.0%
Source: Saskatchewan Archives - Election Results by Electoral Division - Weyburn

Yes Elected.
X Incumbent.

=== 1975 ===
1975 Saskatchewan general election
Party	Candidate	Popular vote	%
New Democratic Party	Yes X James Auburn Pepper	2,971	38.1%
Progressive Conservative	John Whitell	2,522	32.4%
Liberal	Norm Flaten	2,299	29.5%
Total		7,792	100.0%
Source: Saskatchewan Archives - Election Results by Electoral Division - Weyburn

Yes Elected.
X Incumbent.

=== 1978 ===
1978 Saskatchewan general election
Party	Candidate	Popular vote	%
New Democratic Party	Yes X James Auburn Pepper	3,517	38.1%
Progressive Conservative	Glen Dods	3,449	32.4%
Liberal	Ron Chapdelaine	981	29.5%
Total		7,947	100.0%
Source: Saskatchewan Archives - Election Results by Electoral Division - Weyburn

Yes Elected.
X Incumbent.

=== 1982 ===
1982 Saskatchewan general election
Party	Candidate	Popular vote	%
Progressive Conservative	Yes Lorne Henry Hepworth	5,426	60.7%
New Democratic Party	Elaine Driver	3,088	34.6%
Liberal	David J.R. Wright	422	4.7%
Total		8,936	100.0%
Source: Saskatchewan Archives - Election Results by Electoral Division - Weyburn

Yes Elected.

=== 1986 ===
1986 Saskatchewan general election
Party	Candidate	Popular vote	%
Progressive Conservative	Yes X Lorne Henry Hepworth	4,596	52.6%
New Democratic Party	Harry-Jae Elder	3,220	36.9%
Liberal	W.F. (Bill) Rudachyk	859	9.8%
Western Canada Concept	Edwin W. Appenheimer	55	0.6%
Total		8,730	99.9%^{1}
Source: Saskatchewan Archives - Election Results by Electoral Division - Weyburn

Yes Elected.
X Incumbent.
^{1} Rounding error.

=== 1991 ===
1991 Saskatchewan general election
Party	Candidate	Popular vote	%
New Democratic Party	Yes Ronald Wormsbecker	3,883	45.3%
Progressive Conservative	X Lorne Henry Hepworth	2,725	31.8%
Liberal	W.F. (Bill) Rudachyk	1,920	22.4%
Independent	Edwin W. Appenheimer	47	0.5%
Total		8,575	100.0%
Source: Saskatchewan Archives - Election Results by Electoral Division - Weyburn

Yes Elected.
X Incumbent
^{1} Rounding error

== See also ==
- List of Saskatchewan provincial electoral districts
- List of Saskatchewan general elections
- Canadian provincial electoral districts
