= James Pascoe =

British politician and farmer (1863–1931)

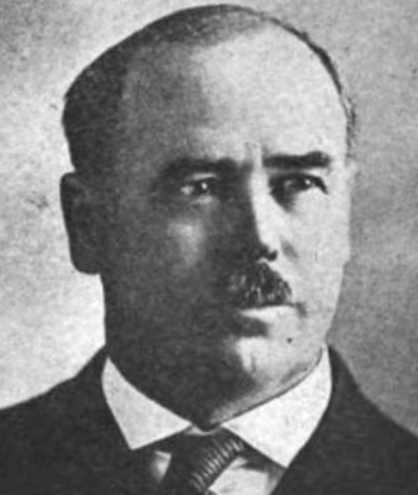

Member of the Legislative Assembly of Saskatchewan
- In office 1921–1925
- Constituency: Moose Jaw City

Mayor of Moose Jaw
- In office 1913–1915

Personal details
- Born: November 29, 1863 Cornwall, England
- Died: September 7, 1931 (aged 67) Moose Jaw, Saskatchewan
- Spouse: Mary Olton (m. 1887)
- Occupation: Farmer, politician

James Pascoe (November 29, 1863 – September 7, 1931) was an English-born farmer and political figure in Saskatchewan. He represented Moose Jaw City in the Legislative Assembly of Saskatchewan from 1921 to 1925 as an independent Conservative.

== Biography ==
He was born in Cornwall on November 29, 1863, the son of John Pascoe and Marjorie Wills, and came to Canada around 1870. The family first settled in North Dorchester, Ontario; in 1892, his parents moved to a homestead near Moose Jaw, Saskatchewan where they spent the rest of their lives. Pascoe acquired his own homestead near Regina around 1883. After four years, he moved to Michigan and then back to Ontario; during this time, he was involved in the lumber business. Pascoe married Mary Olton in 1887. In 1891, he travelled west again, settling on his own homestead near Moose Jaw. He served as chairman of the Local Improvement District surrounding Moose Jaw and then, after he moved his residence to Moose Jaw, as a member of Moose Jaw City Council. Pascoe was mayor of Moose Jaw from 1913 to 1915. He was defeated when he ran for reelection to the provincial assembly in 1925 as a Conservative. Pascoe served as mayor of Moose Jaw again from 1929 until his death in 1931. He died at the age of 67 of a heart attack in a Moose Jaw suburb while attempting to shovel away sand that had been blown around his car by the wind.

His son James Ernest was also a Moose Jaw mayor and served in the Canadian House of Commons.

== Electoral results (partial) ==
1925 Saskatchewan general election: Moose Jaw City
Party	Candidate	Votes	%	Elected
Labour–Liberal	William George Baker	4,704	32.83%	✓
Liberal	William Erskine Knowles	4,095	28.58%	✓
Conservative	James Pascoe	2,809	19.60%	
Conservative	Netson Ross Craig	2,722	18.99%	
Total		14,330	100.00%	

== See also ==
- James Pascoe Group
