= Jules Marion =

Canadian politician

Arthur Jules Marion
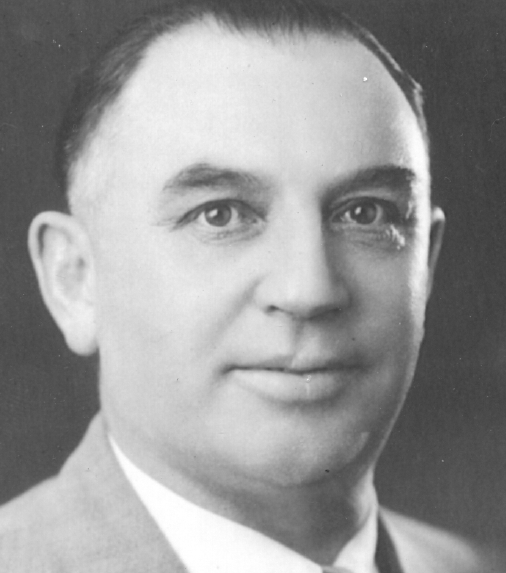

MLA for Athabasca and Île-à-la-Crosse
- In office 1926–1941
- Preceded by: Deakin Alexander Hall
- Succeeded by: Hubert Staines

Personal details
- Born: November 19, 1884 Duck Lake, North-West Territories
- Died: April 5, 1941 (aged 56) Meadow Lake, Saskatchewan
- Party: Liberal
- Spouse: Victorine Boucher
- Occupation: Politician, businessman

Arthur Jules Marion (November 19, 1884 - April 5, 1941) was a Métis politician and businessman. He was first elected as a Liberal MLA in the district of Île-à-la-Crosse in a by-election held in April 1926 after incumbent Joseph Octave Nolin died in office in December 1925. Marion would later be re-elected in the then-recently redrawn district of Athabasca in 1938. Notably, he had been earlier defeated in 1934 by Deakin Alexander Hall, who was also running Liberal.

In July 1941, a by-election was held to fill to the seat left vacant by Marion's own death in office in April 1941. Liberal Hubert Staines was elected to replace him. Marion's son Louis Marcien Marion successfully ran in the next Saskatchewan general election, and served as MLA in Athabasca from 1944 to 1952.

Marion was the brother-in-law of federal Liberal Senator William Albert Boucher.
