= Louis Marcien Marion =

Canadian trader and politician

Louis Marcien Marion (August 12, 1906 – April 6, 1979) was a trader and political figure in Saskatchewan. He represented Athabasca from 1944 to 1952 in the Legislative Assembly of Saskatchewan as a Liberal and then Independent member.

He was the son of A. Jules Marion, who represented the same provincial riding from 1938 to 1941, and Victorine Boucher. Marion was born in Bellevue, Saskatchewan and was educated in Battleford and Edmonton, Alberta. He was a telegraph operator in Île-à-la-Crosse and later operated a trading store there. In 1931, Marion married Constance G. Wright.
