= John Wesley Corman =

Canadian politician

John Wesley Corman (August 2, 1884 – April 29, 1969) was a lawyer and political figure in Saskatchewan. He represented Moose Jaw City from 1944 to 1956 in the Legislative Assembly of Saskatchewan as a Co-operative Commonwealth Federation (CCF) member.

He was born in Stoney Creek, Ontario (now Hamilton, Ontario), the son of William Corman, and studied political science at the University of Toronto. After receiving his B.A. in 1912, he moved west, studying law in Moose Jaw, Saskatchewan, and was called to the Saskatchewan bar in 1915. In 1914, he married Mabel "Con" Conner. Corman practised law in Moose Jaw and was active in the Liberal Party. However, he became dissatisfied with the Liberals during the Great Depression.

He was elected to Moose Jaw City Council in 1937 and was mayor from 1939 to 1944. Corman ran unsuccessfully for a seat in the provincial assembly in 1938 as a Social Credit candidate. He served in the provincial cabinet as Attorney General from 1944 to 1956, when he retired from politics. During his time as Attorney General, the Farm Security Act was passed in 1944 and the Saskatchewan Bill of Rights was passed in 1947. He also hosted the radio show Your Attorney General Speaks from 1946 to 1950.

Corman died in Moose Jaw at the age of 84.
