= Frederick John Thompson =

Canadian boxer and politician (1935–2010)

Member of the Saskatchewan Legislative Assembly for Athabasca
- In office 1960–1975
- Preceded by: Allan Ray Guy
- Succeeded by: Buckley Belanger

Personal details
- Born: May 21, 1935 Big River, Saskatchewan, Canada
- Died: July 7, 2010 (aged 75) Saskatoon, Saskatchewan, Canada
- Party: Saskatchewan New Democratic Party
- Profession: commercial fisherman, trapper

Frederick John Thompson (May 21, 1935 – July 7, 2010) was a commercial fisherman, trapper and political figure in Saskatchewan. He represented Athabasca from 1975 to 1995 in the Legislative Assembly of Saskatchewan as a New Democratic Party (NDP) member.

He was born in Big River, Saskatchewan and later moved to Buffalo Narrows, where he fished, trapped and operated a mink ranch. He was a three-time Saskatchewan boxing champion and coached hockey, baseball and gymnastics. Later in life, Thompson was a professional golf instructor.

He served in the Saskatchewan cabinet as Minister of Economic Development. Thompson was defeated by Buckley Belanger when he ran for reelection to the provincial assembly in 1995.

He died on July 7, 2010 in Saskatoon.
