= Leo Trippe =

Canadian politician

Leonard Lawton Trippe (November 20, 1891 – 1964) was an American-born Canadian hardware merchant, farm implement dealer and political figure in Saskatchewan. He represented Turtleford from 1948 to 1952 in the Legislative Assembly of Saskatchewan as a Liberal.

He was born in Schuyler, Nebraska, the son of Dr. E.R. Trippe, and was educated in the United States. In 1917, Trippe married Maude Wright. He served in the Canadian Expeditionary Force during World War I. He was defeated by Bob Wooff when he ran for reelection in 1952.
