= Turtleford (electoral district) =

Former provincial electoral district in Saskatchewan, Canada

Coordinates: 53°30′N 109°05′W

Turtleford was a provincial electoral district for the Legislative Assembly of the province of Saskatchewan, Canada, centred on the town of Turtleford.

Created before the 4th Saskatchewan general election in 1917, this constituency was dissolved and combined with the Cut Knife district (as "Battleford-Cut Knife") before the 23rd Saskatchewan general election in 1995. It is now part of the ridings of Cut Knife-Turtleford and Rosthern-Shellbrook.

== Members of the Legislative Assembly ==
#	MLA	Served	Party
1.	Archibald B. Gemmell	1917–1929	Liberal
2.	Charles A. Ayre	1929–1938	Liberal
3.	Bill Kerr	1938–1944	Liberal
4.	Bob Wooff	1944–1948	CCF
5.	Leo Trippe	1948–1952	Liberal
6.	Bob Wooff	1952–1956	CCF
7.	Frank Foley	1956–1960	Liberal
8.	Bob Wooff	1960 – Jan. 1961	CCF
9.	Frank Foley	March 1961 – 1964	Liberal
10.	Bob Wooff	1964–1971	CCF-NDP
11.	Michael Feduniak	1971–1975	New Democrat
12.	Lloyd Johnson	1975–1982	New Democrat
13.	Colin Maxwell	1982–1991	Progressive Conservative
14.	Lloyd Johnson	1991–1995	New Democrat

== Election results ==
1917 Saskatchewan general election: Turtleford electoral district
Party	Candidate	Votes	%	±%
Liberal	Archibald B. Gemmell	1,149	53.34%	
Nonpartisan League	John Fleetwood Burns	581	26.97%	
Conservative	Hugh Lockhart	424	19.69%	
Total		2,154	100.00%	

1921 Saskatchewan general election: Turtleford electoral district
Party	Candidate	Votes	%	±%
Liberal	Archibald B. Gemmell	1,186	52.73%	-0.61
Independent	Frederick Webb	1,063	47.27%	–
Total		2,249	100.00%	

1925 Saskatchewan general election: Turtleford electoral district
Party	Candidate	Votes	%	±%
Liberal	Archibald B. Gemmell	1,118	58.63%	+5.90
Progressive	Louis de Montarnal	789	41.37%	–
Total		1,907	100.00%	

1929 Saskatchewan general election: Turtleford electoral district
Party	Candidate	Votes	%	±%
Liberal	Charles A. Ayre	1,628	50.39%	-8.24
Independent	Percival Whitman Farnsworth	1,603	49.61%	-
Total		3,231	100.00%	

1934 Saskatchewan general election: Turtleford electoral district
Party	Candidate	Votes	%	±%
Liberal	Charles A. Ayre	3,411	52.49%	+2.10
Conservative	Percival Whitman Farnsworth	1,599	24.60%	-25.01
Farmer-Labour	John Stegehuis	1,489	22.91%	–
Total		6,499	100.00%	

1938 Saskatchewan general election: Turtleford electoral district
Party	Candidate	Votes	%	±%
Liberal	Bill Kerr	2,925	44.45%	-8.04
Social Credit	James Proctor	2,759	41.93%	–
Conservative	Walter Arnold Hicks	456	6.93%	-17.67
CCF	John Stegehuis	440	6.69%	-16.22
Total		6,580	100.00%	

1944 Saskatchewan general election: Turtleford electoral district
Party	Candidate	Votes	%	±%
CCF	Bob Wooff	2,506	53.65%	+46.96
Liberal	Bill Kerr	1,766	37.81%	-6.64
Prog. Conservative	Chester Hicks	399	8.54%	+1.61
Total		4,671	100.00%	

1948 Saskatchewan general election: Turtleford electoral district
Party	Candidate	Votes	%	±%
Liberal	Leo Trippe	2,462	40.37%	+2.56
CCF	Bob Wooff	2,280	37.38%	-16.27
Social Credit	Matthew Slager	1,357	22.25%	-
Total		6,099	100.00%	

1952 Saskatchewan general election: Turtleford electoral district
Party	Candidate	Votes	%	±%
CCF	Bob Wooff	2,893	46.36%	+8.98
Liberal	Leo Trippe	2,461	39.44%	-0.93
Social Credit	Milton A. Wilson	886	14.20%	-8.05
Total		6,240	100.00%	

1956 Saskatchewan general election: Turtleford electoral district
Party	Candidate	Votes	%	±%
Liberal	Frank Foley	2,322	40.17%	+0.73
CCF	Bob Wooff	2,311	39.98%	-6.38
Social Credit	F.W. Coxson	1,147	19.85%	+5.65
Total		5,780	100.00%	

1960 Saskatchewan general election: Turtleford electoral district
Party	Candidate	Votes	%	±%
CCF	Bob Wooff	2,074	37.28%	-2.70
Liberal	Frank Foley	2,062	37.06%	-3.11
Prog. Conservative	Harvey S. Scott	871	15.65%	-
Social Credit	William E. Shier	557	10.01%	-9.84
Total		5,564	100.00%	

February 22, 1961 By-election: Turtleford electoral district
Party	Candidate	Votes	%	±%
Liberal	Frank Foley	3,126	55.40%	+18.34
CCF	Bob Wooff	2,517	44.60%	+7.32
Total		5,643	100.00%	

1964 Saskatchewan general election: Turtleford electoral district
Party	Candidate	Votes	%	±%
CCF	Bob Wooff	2,221	37.99%	-6.61
Liberal	Frank Foley	2,123	36.32%	-19.08
Prog. Conservative	William E. Armstrong	1,502	25.69%	-
Total		5,846	100.00%	

1967 Saskatchewan general election: Turtleford electoral district
Party	Candidate	Votes	%	±%
NDP	Bob Wooff	2,152	42.28%	+4.29
Liberal	John Flack	2,125	41.75%	+5.43
Prog. Conservative	Hugh E. Konsmo	813	15.97%	-9.72
Total		5,090	100.00%	

1971 Saskatchewan general election: Turtleford electoral district
Party	Candidate	Votes	%	±%
NDP	Michael Feduniak	3,092	55.20%	+12.92
Liberal	George E. Cashmore	2,509	44.80%	+3.05
Total		5,601	100.00%	

1975 Saskatchewan general election: Turtleford electoral district
Party	Candidate	Votes	%	±%
NDP	Lloyd Johnson	2,405	39.65%	-15.55
Liberal	Cyril Fransoo	1,994	32.88%	-11.92
Progressive Conservative	Gordon Mayer	1,666	27.47%	-
Total		6,065	100.00%	

1978 Saskatchewan general election: Turtleford electoral district
Party	Candidate	Votes	%	±%
NDP	Lloyd Johnson	2,983	51.51%	+11.86
Progressive Conservative	Charlie Wells	2,188	37.78%	+10.31
Liberal	Pauline H. Cadrain	620	10.71%	-22.17
Total		5,791	100.00%	

1982 Saskatchewan general election: Turtleford electoral district
Party	Candidate	Votes	%	±%
Progressive Conservative	Colin Maxwell	3,825	56.39%	+18.61
NDP	Lloyd Johnson	2,803	41.32%	-10.19
Liberal	Pauline H. Cadrain	155	2.29%	-8.42
Total		6,783	100.00%	

1986 Saskatchewan general election: Turtleford electoral district
Party	Candidate	Votes	%	±%
Progressive Conservative	Colin Maxwell	3,403	50.13%	-6.26
NDP	Chris Sorenson	2,968	43.73%	+2.41
Liberal	Lucien Briere	417	6.14%	+3.85
Total		6,788	100.00%	

1991 Saskatchewan general election: Turtleford electoral district
Party	Candidate	Votes	%	±%
NDP	Lloyd Johnson	3,269	49.97%	+6.24
Prog. Conservative	Jerry Spenst	2,034	31.09%	-19.04
Liberal	Neil Currie	1,239	18.94%	+12.80
Total		6,542	100.00%	

== See also ==
- List of Saskatchewan provincial electoral districts
- List of Saskatchewan general elections
- Canadian provincial electoral districts
