= Abel James Hindle =

Canadian politician

Abel James Hindle (1870–1954) was a farmer and political figure in Saskatchewan. He represented Willow Bunch in the Legislative Assembly of Saskatchewan from 1917 to 1925 as a Liberal.

He was born in Churchill, Ontario, the son of Abel James Hindle and Mary Ann McKay, and was educated in Owen Sound. His grandparents had come to Canada from Lancashire, England. In 1898, Hindle married Minnie Sinclair. He operated a large farm west of Owen Sound until 1911, when the Hindles moved to Saskatchewan. They settled on a homestead west of Moose Jaw. Hindle was reeve of the rural municipality of Stonehenge from 1914 and 1915. He resigned his seat in 1925 to allow James Albert Cross to be elected to the provincial assembly. He later moved to Regina.
