= Samuel Norval Horner =

Canadian politician (1882–1979)

Samuel Norval Horner (April 2, 1882 – April 25, 1979) was a farmer and political figure in Saskatchewan. He represented Francis from 1929 to 1934 in the Legislative Assembly of Saskatchewan as a Progressive Party member.

He was born in North Clarendon, Quebec, the son of William Horner and Sarah Argue, was educated there and in Shawville, and came to the Creelman, Saskatchewan area around 1909. Horner operated a mixed farm until retiring in 1960. In 1911, he married Jessie F. Alexander. Horner was reeve of the rural municipality of Fillmore for 14 years. He also served as chairman of the Weyburn-Estevan Health Unit.

He ran unsuccessfully for a seat in the provincial assembly in 1921 and 1925 before being elected in 1929. Horner was defeated when he ran for reelection as a Conservative in 1934. He was an unsuccessful candidate running as an independent in the provincial riding of Milestone in 1938. Two years later, Horner ran as a CCF candidate in the federal riding of Assiniboia.

He served on the senate for the University of Saskatchewan from 1949 to 1952 and on the University's board of governors from 1952 to 1958.
