= Anton Huck =

Canadian politician

Anton Huck (September 5, 1881 – 1951) was a general merchant and political figure in Saskatchewan. He represented South Qu'Appelle in the Legislative Assembly of Saskatchewan from 1925 to 1934 as a Liberal.

He was born in South Russia, the son of Anton Huck and Rose Veck, both of German descent, and came to Canada in 1892. In 1903, Huck married Annie Fink. He ran unsuccessfully for a seat in the provincial assembly in 1921 before being elected in 1925. Huck was president of Western Printing. He lived in Vibank, Saskatchewan. Huck owned general stores in Vibank, Odessa and Kendal, a grain elevator in Vibank and lumberyards in Vibank and Kendal. In 1938, he was named to the Saskatchewan Debt Adjustment Board.
