= James Ripley (Canadian politician) =

Canadian politician

James Ripley (December 28, 1913 – February 1, 2002) was a political figure in Saskatchewan. He represented Athabasca from 1952 to 1956 in the Legislative Assembly of Saskatchewan as a Liberal.

He was born in Redcliff, Alberta and moved with his family to Brandon, Manitoba and then Winnipeg. Ripley was educated in Winnipeg and at the University of Manitoba. During World War II, he worked as an aircraft engineer in an aircraft maintenance plant and then joined the Canadian Army in 1945 but did not serve overseas. In 1948, he married Eve Kozier. After the war, Ripley served as a commercial pilot for Central Northern Airways, based in Flin Flon. He also worked as a prospector, contractor, general merchant, mink rancher and a commercial fisherman. From the 1950s to 1975, Ripley operated a fur trading post in Sandy Bay. He also served on the village council for Sandy Bay. Ripley retired to Flin Flon in 1975.
