= Archibald Gemmell =

Canadian politician

Archibald B. "Archie" Gemmell (September 26, 1869 – January 1, 1945) was a farmer and political figure in Saskatchewan. He represented Turtleford in the Legislative Assembly of Saskatchewan from 1917 to 1929 as a Liberal.

He was born in Richmond, Ontario, the son of Robert Gemmell and Christina McFarlane, and was educated there. In 1905, Gemmell married Mabel K. Stewart in Manitoba; he had previously been married to Dorcas McFarlane in Ontario. They settled in Saskatchewan; the village was later named Mervin after Gemmell's son from his first marriage. He was a justice of the peace and served as the first postmaster for Mervin, Saskatchewan. Gemmell retired from politics in 1929 due to a heart condition. He served as supervisor of the Northern Settlers Re-establishment Branch from 1935 until his death of a heart attack in 1945.
