= William Pedersen (politician) =

Canadian politician

William Pedersen (February 28, 1883 – January 31, 1970) was an American-born farmer, rancher and political figure in Saskatchewan. He represented Milestone in the Legislative Assembly of Saskatchewan from 1934 to 1944 as a Liberal.

He was born in Rorbeck, Iowa, the son of Peter Pederson and Anna C. Yarby, both natives of Denmark, and came to Canada in 1907. Pederson was educated in Des Moines and at the Agricultural College in Ames. In 1907, he married Sarah Rebecca Christenson. He served as reeve of the rural municipality of Caledonia from 1925 to 1934. Pederson was also a Mason, president of the Milestone Agricultural Society and president of the Saskatchewan Cattle Breeders' Association. Pederson was defeated by Frank Keem Malcolm when he ran for reelection to the assembly in 1944.
