= Sharon Murrell =

Canadian politician

MLA for Battleford-Cut Knife
- In office 1995–1999
- Preceded by: first member
- Succeeded by: Rudi Peters

Personal details
- Born: 1946 (age 79–80)
- Party: New Democratic Party

Sharon Murrell (born 1946) is a Canadian politician. She represented the electoral district of Battleford-Cut Knife in the Legislative Assembly of Saskatchewan from 1995 to 1999.

She was elected in the 1995 provincial election as a New Democratic Party MLA. In the 1999 election, however, she was defeated by Saskatchewan Party challenger Rudi Peters.

== Biography ==
Elected in 1995, she failed to be re-elected in 1999 when she was defeated by Rudi Peters of the Saskatchewan Party.
