= Jacob Walter Erb =

Canadian politician, educator, and farmer

Jacob Walter Erb (January 16, 1909 – January 1, 1990) was an educator, farmer and political figure in Saskatchewan. He represented Milestone from 1948 to 1964 in the Legislative Assembly of Saskatchewan as a Co-operative Commonwealth Federation (CCF) and then Liberal member.

He was born near Lang, Saskatchewan, the son of Ferdinand Erb and Rosa Wagner, and was educated at Luther College in Regina, at the University of Manitoba and the Chicago Conservatory of Music. After going on a concert tour in the United States, Erb returned to Regina, where he taught music and was dean of boys at Luther College. He married Edna Helsa in 1938. In 1946, he left the college to take up farming in the Lang district. Erb served in the provincial cabinet as Minister of Public Health from 1956 to 1961 and as Minister of Public Works from 1961 to 1962. In 1962, he resigned from cabinet and sat as a Liberal member. Erb was an unsuccessful Liberal candidate for the Regina East seat in the provincial assembly in 1964. After leaving politics, he served as chairman of the Workmen's Compensation Board. He died in Los Angeles, California at the age of 80.
