= Walter George Robinson =

Canadian politician

Walter George Robinson (July 19, 1873 – 1949) was an insurance and loan agent and political figure in Saskatchewan, Canada. He represented Francis in the Legislative Assembly of Saskatchewan from 1912 to 1929 as a Liberal.

Robinson was born at Mascouche Rapids, Quebec, the son of Thomas Robinson and Sarah Jane McCurdy. He was educated in Listowel, Owen Sound and Regina. In 1903, Robinson married Bessie Cameron. He served as speaker for the Saskatchewan assembly from 1925 to 1929. Robinson lived in Francis.
