= Willow Bunch (provincial electoral district) =

Former provincial electoral district in Saskatchewan, Canada

Coordinates: 49°25′N 106°00′W

Willow Bunch is a former provincial electoral division for the Legislative Assembly of the province of Saskatchewan, Canada, centred on the Rural Municipality of Willow Bunch No. 42. This district was created before the 3rd Saskatchewan general election in 1912. The constituency was dissolved and combined with the Notukeu district (as Notukeu-Willow Bunch) before the 9th Saskatchewan general election in 1938.

It is now part of the Wood River constituency. A federal electoral district in the same area called "Willow Bunch" existed from 1924 until 1935.

== Members of the Legislative Assembly ==
#	MLA	Served	Party
1.	William W. Davidson	1912 – 1917	Conservative
2.	Abel James Hindle	1917 – 1925	Liberal
3.	James Albert Cross	Sept. 1925 – 1929	Liberal
4.	Charles William Johnson	1929 – 1938	Liberal

== Election results ==
1912 Saskatchewan general election: Willow Bunch electoral district
Party	Candidate	Votes	%	±%
Conservative	William W. Davidson	825	50.46%	–
Liberal	S.C. Wright	810	49.54%	–
Total		1,635	100.00%	

1917 Saskatchewan general election: Willow Bunch electoral district
Party	Candidate	Votes	%	±%
Liberal	Abel James Hindle	2,701	66.84%	+17.30
Conservative	James Lambe	1,340	33.16%	-17.30
Total		4,041	100.00%	

1921 Saskatchewan general election: Willow Bunch electoral district
Party	Candidate	Votes	%	±%
Liberal	Abel James Hindle	3,040	54.55%	-12.29
Progressive	John Henry Wallace	2,533	45.45%	–
Total		5,573	100.00%	

1925 Saskatchewan general election: Willow Bunch electoral district
Party	Candidate	Votes	%	±%
Liberal	Abel James Hindle	2,949	58.28%	+3.73
Progressive	James Henry Stewart	2,111	41.72%	-3.73
Total		5,060	100.00%	

August 31, 1925 By-Election: Willow Bunch electoral district
Party	Candidate	Votes	%	±%
Liberal	James Albert Cross	Acclaimed	100.00%	
Total		Acclamation		

1929 Saskatchewan general election: Willow Bunch electoral district
Party	Candidate	Votes	%	±%
Liberal	Charles William Johnson	4,423	50.61%	-
Conservative	William James Gibbins	4,316	49.39%	-
Total		8,739	100.00%	

1934 Saskatchewan general election: Willow Bunch electoral district
Party	Candidate	Votes	%	±%
Liberal	Charles William Johnson	2,448	47.88%	-2.73
Conservative	Edgar B. Linnell	1,445	28.27%	-21.12
Farmer-Labour	Charles Morley W. Emery	1,219	23.85%	–
Total		5,112	100.00%	

== See also ==
- List of Saskatchewan provincial electoral districts
- List of Saskatchewan general elections
- Canadian provincial electoral districts
