= Ronald Wormsbecker =

Canadian politician

MLA for Weyburn
- In office 1991–1995

Personal details
- Born: April 17, 1948 (age 78)
- Party: Saskatchewan New Democratic Party
- Occupation: lawyer

Ronald Joseph Wormsbecker (born April 17, 1948) was a Canadian politician who served in the Legislative Assembly of Saskatchewan from 1991 to 1995, as a NDP member for the constituency of Weyburn.
