= Frank Foley (politician) =

Canadian politician

Franklin Edward "Frank" Foley (April 1, 1922 – October 8, 1981) was an educator and political figure in Saskatchewan. He represented Turtleford from 1956 to 1960 and from 1961 to 1964 in the Legislative Assembly of Saskatchewan as a Liberal.

He was born in Saskatoon, Saskatchewan and was educated in Marsden, at St. Thomas College in Battleford and at the Teacher's College in Moose Jaw. Foley served in the Royal Canadian Air Force during World War II. He received his BEd from the University of Saskatchewan in 1951. Foley later was principal of the high school in Glaslyn. He ran for the leadership of the provincial Liberal party in 1959. He was defeated by Bob Wooff when he ran for reelection to the provincial assembly in 1960; that election was subsequently overturned after an appeal and Foley was elected in a by-election held the following year. After leaving politics, Foley served as superintendent for the Kerrobert School Unit.
