= Rudi Peters =

Canadian politician

MLA for Battleford-Cut Knife
- In office 1999–2002
- Preceded by: Sharon Murrell
- Succeeded by: Wally Lorenz

Personal details
- Born: January 30, 1939 Rabbit Lake, Saskatchewan
- Died: 30 November 2002 (aged 63) North Battleford, Saskatchewan
- Party: Saskatchewan Party
- Occupation: farmer

Rudi Peters (born January 30, 1939 - November 30, 2002) was a Canadian politician who served in the Legislative Assembly of Saskatchewan from 1995 to 1999, as a Saskatchewan Party member for the constituency of Battleford-Cut Knife.

Near the end of his first term as a member of the Saskatchewan Legislative Assembly, Peters died at the age of 63, succumbing to cancer.
