= Joseph Glenn =

Canadian politician

Joseph Glenn (August 29, 1860 – April 20, 1931) was a farmer and political figure in Saskatchewan. He represented South Qu'Appelle in the Legislative Assembly of Saskatchewan from 1912 to 1921 as a Conservative.

He was born in Chatworth, Canada West, and came to Indian Head, District of Assiniboia, North West Territories, in 1882. Glenn established a feed and livery stable there and also imported work horses from Ontario. He served as a dispatch rider during the North-West Rebellion of 1885. Glenn later delivered mail in the region for several years. In 1886, he married Christina Gordon. From 1906 to 1920, Glenn built and operated grain elevators in Indian Head, Odessa, Grand Coulee and Milestone. He served overseas as lieutenant-colonel in charge of the Canadian Forestry Division during World War I. Glenn was first elected to the provincial assembly in a 1912 by-election held after Frederick W. A. G. Haultain was named a judge.
