= William Gladstone Ross =

Canadian politician

William Gladstone Ross (January 14, 1889 – January 14, 1948) was a lawyer and political figure in Saskatchewan. He represented Moose Jaw City from 1927 to 1929 and from 1934 to 1944 in the Legislative Assembly of Saskatchewan as a Liberal.

Ross was born near Moose Jaw, the son of George M. Ross and Flora McGillivray, and was educated there and at Queen's University. Ross then studied law and was called to the Saskatchewan bar in 1915. In the same year, he married Dorothea L. Scott. He served on the Moose Jaw City Council. In 1917, Ross ran unsuccessfully for a seat in the provincial assembly. He was first elected in a 1927 by-election held after William Erskine Knowles was named a judge; he was defeated when he ran for reelection in 1929. Ross was president of the Moose Jaw Red Cross Society and served on the board of governors for the Moose Jaw General Hospital. After leaving politics, Ross was named to the Saskatchewan Court of King's Bench. He died of cancer in Rochester, Minnesota.
