= Francis (electoral district) =

Former provincial electoral district in Saskatchewan, Canada

Coordinates: 50°06′30″N 103°52′30″W

Francis is a former provincial electoral division for the Legislative Assembly of the province of Saskatchewan, Canada, centred on the town of Francis, Saskatchewan. This district was created before the 2nd Saskatchewan general election in 1908. The riding was dissolved and combined with the Milestone and Qu'Appelle-Wolseley districts before the 9th Saskatchewan general election in 1938. It is now part of the constituency of Indian Head-Milestone.

== Members of the Legislative Assembly ==
#	MLA	Served	Party
1.	John James Stevenson	1908–1912	Liberal
2.	Walter George Robinson	1912–1929	Liberal
3.	Samuel Norval Horner	1929–1934	Progressive
4.	Charles Morton Dunn	1934–1938	Liberal

== Election results ==
1908 Saskatchewan general election: Francis electoral district
Party	Candidate	Votes	%	±%
Liberal	John James Stevenson	976	52.67%	–
Provincial Rights	John Wesley Mahan	877	47.33%	–
Total		1,853	100.00%	

1912 Saskatchewan general election: Francis electoral district
Party	Candidate	Votes	%	±%
Liberal	Walter George Robinson	1,087	60.83%	+8.16
Conservative	John Wesley Mahan	700	39.17%	-8.16
Total		1,787	100.00%	

1917 Saskatchewan general election: Francis electoral district
Party	Candidate	Votes	%	±%
Liberal	Walter George Robinson	1,858	60.21%	-0.62
Conservative	Franklin William James	1,228	39.79%	+0.62
Total		3,086	100.00%	

1921 Saskatchewan general election: Francis electoral district
Party	Candidate	Votes	%	±%
Liberal	Walter George Robinson	1,456	54.25%	-5.96
Independent	Samuel Norval Horner	1,228	45.75%	–
Total		2,684	100.00%	

1925 Saskatchewan general election: Francis electoral district
Party	Candidate	Votes	%	±%
Liberal	Walter George Robinson	1,641	54.05%	-0.20
Progressive	Samuel Norval Horner	1,395	45.95%	+0.20
Total		3,036	100.00%	

1929 Saskatchewan general election: Francis electoral district
Party	Candidate	Votes	%	±%
Progressive	Samuel Norval Horner	2,485	58.10%	+12.15
Liberal	Walter George Robinson	1,792	41.90%	-12.15
Total		4,277	100.00%	

1934 Saskatchewan general election: Francis electoral district
Party	Candidate	Votes	%	±%
Liberal	Charles Morton Dunn	2,504	45.65%	+3.75
Conservative	Samuel Norval Horner	1,896	34.57%	-23.53
Farmer-Labour	Robert Ernest Juby	1,085	19.78%	-
Total		5,485	100.00%	

== See also ==
- List of Saskatchewan provincial electoral districts
- List of Saskatchewan general elections
- Canadian provincial electoral districts
