= Athabasca (Saskatchewan provincial electoral district) =

Provincial electoral district in Saskatchewan, Canada

Saskatchewan electoral district

Provincial electoral district
- Legislature: Legislative Assembly of Saskatchewan
MLA
Leroy Laliberte
New Democratic
- District created: 1908
- First contested: 1908
- Last contested: 2024

Demographics
- Population (2001): 13,041
- Electors (2003): 7,146
- Census division: Division No. 18
- Census subdivision(s): Beauval, Buffalo Narrows, Buffalo River Dene Nation 193, Canoe Lake 165, Chicken 224, Chicken 225, Clearwater River Dene 222, Clearwater River Dene Band 223, Cole Bay, Division No. 18, Unorganized, Dore Lake, Fond du Lac 227, Green Lake, Île-à-la-Crosse, Jans Bay, La Loche, La Plonge 192, Michel Village, Patuanak, Pinehouse, St. George's Hill, Stony Rapids, Turnor Lake, Wapachewunak 192D

Athabasca is a provincial electoral district for the Legislative Assembly of Saskatchewan, Canada. It is located in the extreme northwest corner of the province. The major industries are tourism, mineral extraction, forestry, commercial fishing, and trapping. The Cluff Lake uranium mine is located in this constituency, as well as the Athabasca Sand Dunes Provincial Park and the Clearwater River Provincial Park. The major communities are La Loche, Île-à-la-Crosse and Buffalo Narrows with populations of 2,136, 1,268, and 1,137 respectively.

The district was most recently contested in the 2020 general election, during which incumbent NDP MLA Buckley Belanger was re-elected, but a by-election is scheduled for February 15, 2022 to replace Belanger who resigned to run (unsuccessfully) for the Liberal Party of Canada in the riding of Desnethé—Missinippi—Churchill River during the 2021 Canadian federal election.

The original Athabasca electoral district was created before the 1908 general election out of parts of Battleford, Redberry, Prince Albert and Kinistino, and consisted of the sparsely populated northern half of Saskatchewan. For the 1912 general election, the electoral district was divided in half, with the eastern half becoming Cumberland. The district's southern border was slightly altered before the 1917 general election, and was renamed Île-à-la-Crosse. Île-à-la-Crosse and Cumberland were re-joined prior to the 1934 general election, and the new combined riding was given the name Athabasca. Cumberland was split off again prior to the 1938 general election. Prior to the 1952 general election, Athabasca was shifted to the northeastern corner of the province, with most of its previous incarnation being transferred to Meadow Lake, with small parts transferred to the new Athabasca riding and Cumberland. This arrangement lasted until the 1971 general election, when the northern half of Meadow Lake was added back to the district. Finally, prior to the 1975 general election, the riding moved back to the northwestern corner of the province, adding back most of the territory in Meadow Lake, while losing it eastern half to Cumberland. The riding has remained in this configuration ever since.

== History ==
In 1995 Buckley Belanger was elected, winning by 159 votes. Belanger left the Liberals, putting his seat on the line to run as a New Democrat. In the by-election, he defeated the Liberal candidate by 2,050 votes (94% of the popular vote), the second-largest majority in the history of the province. Belanger was subsequently re-elected in every general election since then, most recently in 2016. He resigned in 2021 to run as a Liberal in the 2021 Canadian federal election, but failed to be elected to the federal riding of Desnethé—Missinippi—Churchill River. After his defeat, he declined to seek re-election to his provincial seat. In the subsequent by-election, the Saskatchewan Party's Jim Lemaigre, defeating NDP candidate Georgina Jolibois. This was considered an upset, as the NDP has held the predominantly-indigenous riding almost continuously since 1975.

Along with the neighbouring northern riding of Cumberland, Athabasca is considered one of the safest New Democratic seats in Saskatchewan, although candidates for the centre-right Saskatchewan Party have polled somewhat better results in the 21st century compared to SP and Progressive Conservative candidates in previous elections.

== Member of the Legislative Assembly ==
This riding has elected the following members of the Legislative Assembly:

Legislature	Years	Member	Party
Athabasca
2nd	1908–1912	Joseph Nolin	Liberal
3rd	1912–1917	Joseph Nolin	Liberal
Île-à-la-Crosse
4th	1917–1921	Joseph Nolin	Liberal
5th	1921–1925	Joseph Nolin	Liberal
6th	1925–1926	Joseph Nolin	Liberal
6th	1926–1929	A. Jules Marion	Liberal
7th	1929–1934	A. Jules Marion	Liberal
Athabasca
8th	1934–1938	Deakin Hall	Liberal
9th	1938–1941	Jules Marion	Liberal
9th	1941–1944	Hubert Staines	Liberal
10th	1944–1948	Louis Marcien Marion	Liberal
11th	1948–1952	Louis Marcien Marion	Independent
12th	1952–1956	James Ripley	Liberal
13th	1956–1960	John James Harrop	Co-operative Commonwealth
14th	1960–1964	Allan Ray Guy	Liberal
15th	1964–1967	Allan Ray Guy	Liberal
16th	1967–1971	Allan Ray Guy	Liberal
17th	1971–1972	Allan Ray Guy	Liberal
17th	1972–1975	Allan Ray Guy	Liberal
18th	1975–1978	Frederick John Thompson	New Democratic
19th	1978–1982	Frederick John Thompson	New Democratic
20th	1982–1986	Frederick John Thompson	New Democratic
21st	1986–1991	Frederick John Thompson	New Democratic
22nd	1991–1995	Frederick John Thompson	New Democratic
23rd	1995–1998	Buckley Belanger	Liberal
23rd	1998–1999	Buckley Belanger	New Democratic
24th	1999–2003	Buckley Belanger	New Democratic
25th	2003–2007	Buckley Belanger	New Democratic
26th	2007–2011	Buckley Belanger	New Democratic
27th	2011–2016	Buckley Belanger	New Democratic
28th	2016–2020	Buckley Belanger	New Democratic
29th	2020–2021	Buckley Belanger	New Democratic
29th	2022–2024	Jim Lemaigre	Saskatchewan
30th	2024–Present	Leroy Laliberte	New Democratic

== Election results ==
=== Athabasca, 1934–present ===
2024 Saskatchewan general election
Party	Candidate	Votes	%	±%
New Democratic	Leroy Laliberte	1,823	62.80	+22.40
Saskatchewan	Jim Lemaigre	1,035	35.65	-15.65
Green	Raven Reid	45	1.55	–
Total valid votes		2,903	99.15	
Total rejected ballots		25	0.85	+0.10
Turnout		2,928	31.45	+7.03
Eligible voters		9,310		
New Democratic gain from Saskatchewan		Swing		+18
Source: Elections Saskatchewan

Saskatchewan provincial by-election, 15 February 2022 Resignation of Buckley Belanger
Party	Candidate	Votes	%	±%
Saskatchewan	Jim Lemaigre	1,163	51.3	+14.79
New Democratic	Georgina Jolibois	916	40.4	-16.40
Independent	Darwin Roy	157	6.9	-
Buffalo	Clint Arnason	12	0.5	-
Total valid votes		2,248	99.1	
Total rejected ballots		17	0.8	-0.05
Turnout		2,265	24.42	-9.21
Eligible voters		9,277		
Saskatchewan gain from New Democratic		Swing		+15.6
Source: Elections Saskatchewan

2020 Saskatchewan general election
Party	Candidate	Votes	%	±%
New Democratic	Buckley Belanger	1,730	56.80	-7.88
Saskatchewan	Kelly Kwan	1,112	36.51	+12.79
Green	Leroy Laliberte	204	6.70	+4.75
Total valid votes		3,046	99.14	
Total rejected ballots		26	0.85	+0.44
Turnout		3,072	33.63	+0.22
Eligible voters		9,136		
New Democratic hold		Swing		-10.33
Source: Elections Saskatchewan

2016 Saskatchewan general election
Party	Candidate	Votes	%	±%
New Democratic	Buckley Belanger	1,756	64.68	+0.88
Saskatchewan	Philip Elliott	644	23.72	-11.16
Liberal	Michael Wolverine	262	9.65	–
Green	Max C.D. Morin	53	1.95	+0.62
Total valid votes		2,715	99.60	
Total rejected ballots		11	0.40	+0.10
Turnout		2,726	33.40	-12.17
Eligible voters		8,161		
New Democratic hold		Swing		+5.98
Source: Elections Saskatchewan, Global News

2011 Saskatchewan general election
Party	Candidate	Votes	%	±%
New Democratic	Buckley Belanger	1,888	63.83	+4.42
Saskatchewan	Bobby Woods	1,030	34.82	+2.93
Green	George Durocher	40	1.35	–1.86
Total valid votes		2,958	99.70	
Total rejected ballots		9	0.30	-0.20
Turnout		2,967	45.57	-9.56
Eligible voters		6,511		
New Democratic hold		Swing		+0.75

2007 Saskatchewan general election
Party	Candidate	Votes	%	±%
New Democratic	Buckley Belanger	1,885	59.41	–11.26
Saskatchewan	Phil Elliott	1,012	31.89	+9.18
Liberal	Malvina Iron	174	5.48	–0.49
Green	Sean Gilchrist	102	3.21	–
Total valid votes		3,173	99.50	
Total rejected ballots		16	0.50	+0.03
Turnout		3,189	55.13	-7.79
Eligible voters		5,785		
New Democratic hold		Swing		–10.22

2003 Saskatchewan general election
Party	Candidate	Votes	%	±%
New Democratic	Buckley Belanger	2,508	70.67	–13.71
Saskatchewan	Greg Ross	806	22.71	+20.16
Liberal	Philip Durocher	212	5.97	–7.09
Progressive Conservative	Sean Gilchrist	23	0.54	–
Total valid votes		3,549	99.52	
Total rejected ballots		17	0.48	-0.09
Turnout		3,566	62.91	+12.70
Eligible voters		5,668		
New Democratic hold		Swing		–16.94

1999 Saskatchewan general election
Party	Candidate	Votes	%	±%
New Democratic	Buckley Belanger	2,512	84.38	–9.27
Liberal	Allan Adam	389	13.07	+8.85
Saskatchewan	Bert Roach	76	2.55	+0.42
Total valid votes		2,977	99.43	
Total rejected ballots		17	0.57	-0.12
Turnout		2,994	50.21	+8.50
Eligible voters		5,963		
New Democratic hold		Swing		–9.06

Saskatchewan provincial by-election, 26 October 1998 Resignation of Buckley Belanger
Party	Candidate	Votes	%	±%
New Democratic	Buckley Belanger	2,153	93.65	+53.43
Liberal	Winston McKay	97	4.22	–41.38
Saskatchewan	Tyson Delorme	49	2.13	+1.16
Total valid votes		2,299	99.31	
Total rejected ballots		16	0.69	-0.28
Turnout		2,315	41.71	-6.76
Eligible voters		5,550		
New Democratic gain from Liberal		Swing		+47.41
Source: Elections Saskatchewan,

^ Saskatchewan Party change compared to Progressive Conservative

1995 Saskatchewan general election
Party	Candidate	Votes	%	±%
Liberal	Buckley Belanger	1,347	45.60	+40.86
New Democratic	Fred Thompson	1,188	40.22	–43.58
Independent	Jimmy Montgrand	390	13.20	–
Progressive Conservative	Clay Poupart	29	0.98	–7.54
Total valid votes		2,954	99.03	
Total rejected ballots		29	0.97	-1.59
Turnout		2,983	48.47	-22.23
Eligible voters		6,154		
Liberal gain from New Democratic		Swing		+42.22

1991 Saskatchewan general election
Party	Candidate	Votes	%	±%
New Democratic	Fred Thompson	3,253	83.80	+28.60
Progressive Conservative	Frank Petit	331	8.53	–2.18
Liberal	Darren McKee	184	4.74	–29.36
Independent	Mike Daley	114	2.94	–
Total valid votes		3,882	97.44	
Total rejected ballots		102	2.56	+1.82
Turnout		3,984	70.70	+2.51
Eligible voters		5,635		
New Democratic hold		Swing		+15.39

1986 Saskatchewan general election
Party	Candidate	Votes	%	±%
New Democratic	Fred Thompson	2,357	55.20	+16.04
Liberal	Jim Durocher	1,456	34.10	+30.51
Progressive Conservative	Pat Cardinal	457	10.70	–17.63
Total valid votes		4,270	99.26	
Total rejected ballots		32	0.74	-0.44
Turnout		4,302	68.19	+3.26
Eligible voters		6,309		
New Democratic hold		Swing		–7.24

1982 Saskatchewan general election
Party	Candidate	Votes	%	±%
New Democratic	Frederick J. Thompson	1,606	39.16	–19.08
Progressive Conservative	Bruce Clarke	1,162	26.33	–1.03
Independent	Rod Bishop	976	23.80	–
Aboriginal People's	Vital Morin	210	5.10	–
Liberal	Willard Quewezance	147	3.58	–8.81
Total valid votes		4,101	98.82	
Total rejected ballots		49	1.18	+0.07
Turnout		4,150	64.92	-3.38
Eligible voters		6,392		
New Democratic hold		Swing		–9.02

1978 Saskatchewan general election
Party	Candidate	Votes	%	±%
New Democratic	Fred Thompson	2,340	58.24	+20.11
Progressive Conservative	Frank Petit	1,180	29.37	+18.55
Liberal	Hal Coupland	498	12.39	–17.35
Total valid votes		4,018	98.89	
Total rejected ballots		45	1.11	+0.39
Turnout		4,063	68.31	-10.29
Eligible voters		5,948		
New Democratic hold		Swing		+0.78

1975 Saskatchewan general election
Party	Candidate	Votes	%	±%
New Democratic	Fred Thompson	1,483	38.12	–4.39
Liberal	Ben Siemens	1,157	29.74	–13.70
Independent	Rod Bishop	829	21.31	–
Progressive Conservative	Roy Simpson	421	10.82	+9.64
Total valid votes		3,890	99.29	
Total rejected ballots		28	0.71	
Turnout		3,918	78.60	
Eligible voters		4,985		
New Democratic gain from Liberal		Swing		+4.66

Saskatchewan provincial by-election, 27 September 1972 On the election being overturned by judicial recount
Party	Candidate	Votes	%	±%
Liberal	Allan Ray Guy	1,398	43.44	–6.73
New Democratic	Robert Dalby	1,368	42.51	–7.32
Independent	Ray Jones	414	12.87	–
Progressive Conservative	William Howard McGill	38	1.18	–
Total valid votes		3,218	100.0	
Liberal hold		Swing		+0.30
Source: Saskatchewan Archives,

1971 Saskatchewan general election
Party	Candidate	Votes	%	±%
Liberal	Allan Ray Guy	1,770	50.17	+0.58
New Democratic	Robert Dalby	1,758	49.83	+28.46
Total valid votes		3,528	100.0	
Liberal hold		Swing		–13.94

1967 Saskatchewan general election
Party	Candidate	Votes	%	±%
Liberal	Allan Ray Guy	1,397	49.59	+9.28
Progressive Conservative	Harry J. Houghton	818	29.04	–5.02
New Democratic	Tony Wood	602	21.37	–4.26
Total valid votes		2,817	100.0	
Liberal hold		Swing		+7.15

1964 Saskatchewan general election
Party	Candidate	Votes	%	±%
Liberal	Allan Ray Guy	1,076	40.31	+6.41
Progressive Conservative	Harry J. Houghton	909	34.06	+12.36
Co-operative Commonwealth	John M. Stonehocker	684	25.63	–2.31
Total valid votes		2,669	100.0	
Liberal hold		Swing		–2.98

1960 Saskatchewan general election
Party	Candidate	Votes	%	±%
Liberal	Allan Ray Guy	972	33.90	–9.81
Co-operative Commonwealth	Allan Quant	801	27.94	–21.44
Progressive Conservative	Harry J. Houghton	622	21.70	–
Social Credit	Dana Spence	472	16.46	+9.55
Total valid votes		2,867	100.0	
Liberal gain from Co-operative Commonwealth		Swing		+5.82

1956 Saskatchewan general election
Party	Candidate	Votes	%	±%
Co-operative Commonwealth	John James Harrop	836	49.38	+10.74
Liberal	Frederick Alexander Matheson	740	43.71	–17.65
Social Credit	John I. Bondoreff	117	6.91	–
Total valid votes		1,693	100.0	
Co-operative Commonwealth gain from Liberal		Swing		+14.19

1952 Saskatchewan general election
Party	Candidate	Votes	%	±%
Liberal	James Ripley	543	61.36	–
Co-operative Commonwealth	C.L. MacLean	342	38.64	+10.08
Total valid votes		885	100.0	
Liberal gain from Independent		Swing		+56.98

1948 Saskatchewan general election
Party	Candidate	Votes	%	±%
Independent	Louis Marcien Marion	628	52.60	–28.18
Co-operative Commonwealth	Axel Olsen	341	28.56	+21.20
Independent	Joseph David Le Chasseur	225	18.84	–
Total valid votes		1,194	100.0	
Independent notional gain from Liberal		Swing		–24.69

1944 Saskatchewan general election
Party	Candidate	Votes	%
Liberal	Louis Marcien Marion	626	80.77
Independent	Errick Guttormur Erickson	78	10.06
Co-operative Commonwealth	Pierre Ephrem Ayotte	57	7.35
Progressive Conservative	Alexander Fred De Laronde	9	1.16
Independent Liberal	Francis Xavier Poitras	5	0.65
Total valid votes		775	100.0

Saskatchewan provincial by-election, 28 July 1941 On the death of Jules Marion, 5 April 1941
Party	Candidate	Votes
Liberal	Hubert Staines	acclaimed

1938 Saskatchewan general election
Party	Candidate	Votes	%	±%
Liberal	Jules Marion	642	50.55	+8.36
Liberal	William J. Windrum	628	49.45	–
Total valid votes		1,270	100.0	
Liberal gain from Liberal		Swing		+20.54

1934 Saskatchewan general election
Party	Candidate	Votes	%	±%
Liberal	Deakin Hall	1,329	57.81	
Liberal	Jules Marion	970	42.19	-24.63
Total valid votes		2,299	100.0	
Liberal gain from Liberal		Swing		+41.22

=== Île-à-la-Crosse, 1917–1934 ===
1929 Saskatchewan general election
Party	Candidate	Votes	%	±%
Liberal	A. Jules Marion	862	66.82	+2.52
Conservative	Albert A. Bock	428	33.18	
Total valid votes		1,290	100.0	
Liberal hold		Swing		-15.33

Saskatchewan provincial by-election, 6 April 1926 Death of Joseph Octave Nolin
Party	Candidate	Votes	%	±%
Liberal	A. Jules Marion	652	64.30	+2.99
Liberal	Joseph Eugene Burnouf	362	35.70	
Total valid votes		1,014	100.0	
Liberal hold		Swing		-16.35
Source: Saskatchewan Archives,

1925 Saskatchewan general election
Party	Candidate	Votes	%	±%
Liberal	Joseph Octave Nolin	591	61.31	+3.39
Independent	F. M. Clark	373	38.69	
Total valid votes		964	100.0	
Liberal hold		Swing		-17.65

1921 Saskatchewan general election
Party	Candidate	Votes	%	±%
Liberal	Joseph Octave Nolin	384	57.92	-13.08
Independent	Joseph Eugene Burnouf	279	42.08	
Total valid votes		663	100.0	
Liberal hold		Swing		-27.58

1917 Saskatchewan general election
Party	Candidate	Votes	%	±%
Liberal	Joseph Octave Nolin	328	71.00	-9.30
Independent	Leon Sergeant	134	29.00	
Total valid votes		462	100.0	
Liberal hold		Swing		-19.15

=== Athabasca, 1908–1917 ===
1912 Saskatchewan general election
Party	Candidate	Votes	%	±%
Liberal	Joseph Nolin	163	80.30	–16.26
Progressive Conservative	George Robert Russel	40	19.70	+16.26
Total valid votes		203	100.0	
Liberal hold		Swing		–16.26

^ Progressive Conservative change from Provincial Rights

1908 Saskatchewan general election
Party	Candidate	Votes	%
Liberal	Joseph Nolin	252	96.55
Provincial Rights	Aime T. Besnard	9	3.45
Total valid votes		261	100.0
Liberal pickup new district.			

== See also ==
- List of Saskatchewan provincial electoral districts
- Canadian provincial electoral districts
- List of Saskatchewan general elections
