= John Stevenson (Saskatchewan politician) =

Canadian politician

John James Stevenson (May 11, 1873 – September 21, 1956) was a Saskatchewan politician and Canadian Senator.

He was born in Russell, Ontario, but subsequently moved west where he worked as a farmer and lumber merchant in Saskatchewan. He made his home in Waskesiu, the only town in Prince Albert National Park.

Stevenson was elected to the Legislative Assembly of Saskatchewan in the 1908 provincial election, the new province's second general election. Stevenson represented the electoral district of Francis for four years as a Liberal MLA before choosing not to run for re-election in 1912.

Stevenson was prominent as an organizer for the Liberal Party of Canada in the province. In 1940, he was appointed to the Senate of Canada by Prime Minister William Lyon Mackenzie King and represented the Senatorial division of Prince Albert, Saskatchewan until his death in 1956.
