= Michael Feduniak =

Canadian politician

Michael Feduniak (June 1, 1914 – August 30, 1989) was a businessman and political figure in Saskatchewan. He represented Turtleford from 1971 to 1975 in the Legislative Assembly of Saskatchewan as a New Democratic Party (NDP) member.

He was born in Fairholme, Saskatchewan and was educated in Saskatoon and Hamilton, Ontario. During World War II, he worked as a machinist in the armaments industry in the Hamilton area. In 1942, he married Eva Crocker. In 1945, he opened a general store in Glaslyn; he later operated a farm implement dealership. Feduniak served on the village council for Glaslyn. After retiring from politics in 1975, he moved to North Battleford. He died in Saskatoon at the age of 75.
