= Hubert Staines =

Canadian politician

Hubert Staines (November 23, 1893 – September 26, 1970) was an English-born educator and political figure in Saskatchewan. He represented Athabasca from 1941 to 1944 in the Legislative Assembly of Saskatchewan as a Liberal.

He was born in Essex, the son of William Staines and Sarah Mary Olstead, and came to Canada in 1913. He was educated at Brandon College and at the normal school in Regina. During World War I, he served overseas in a field ambulance unit. Staines taught at Moose Jaw College from 1924 to 1927 and then was principal of a public school and high school in Rosetown. In 1927, he married Lillian Mary Dale. Before entering provincial politics, Staines was a history teacher at Prince Albert Collegiate. He was elected to the provincial assembly in a 1941 by-election held following the death of A. Jules Marion. Staines served in the provincial cabinet as Minister of Education. After retiring from the legislature, he continued to serve as adviser to provincial Liberal Party leaders. Staines was also statistician for the Saskatchewan Liberal Party until 1965. He was named executive director for the Saskatchewan Centennial Corporation in 1964. Staines died in Regina at the age of 76.
