= John Henry Wellington =

Canadian politician

John Henry Wellington (February 3, 1861 – March 24, 1937) was a railway worker, coal merchant and political figure in Saskatchewan. He represented Moose Jaw City in the Legislative Assembly of Saskatchewan from 1905 to 1912 as a Provincial Rights Party member.

He was born in Forest, Canada West, the son of John Wellington, and was educated in Forest and in Saginaw City, Michigan. Wellington worked as a fireman on the Grand Trunk Railway and as an engineer for the Canadian Pacific Railway. He was married twice: first to Emma Ward in 1880 and then to Margaret McPherson in 1905. Wellington lived in Moose Jaw, moving there in 1893. He retired from railway work in 1905. Wellington served as a member of the school board and police commission and as an alderman for Moose Jaw. He died at home in Moose Jaw at the age of 76.
