= Charles Arthur Ayre =

Canadian politician

Charles Arthur Ayre (November 24, 1890 – February 1, 1974) was a British-born merchant, civil official and political figure in Saskatchewan. He represented Turtleford in the Legislative Assembly of Saskatchewan from 1929 to 1938 as a Liberal.

He was born in Wellingborough, Northamptonshire, the son of the Reverend George James Ayre and Margaret Mary Burgess, and was educated in Bath, Somersetshire and at Hymers College in Hull, Yorkshire. Ayre was the grandson of Newfoundland politician Charles Robert Ayre. He came to Luxembourg, Saskatchewan in 1910 as a student minister, staying there until June 1911 when he moved to Maidstone.

Ayre left the ministry in the summer of the following year and moved to Mervin, where he worked in a general store. Ayre established himself as a notary public and also served as a justice of the peace. In 1914, he began work at a store in Turtleford, also working as a notary public and selling insurance. Ayre married Edith Mary Davis in 1915. In 1917, he became the franchise owner for farm equipment sold by International Harvester, McCormick-Deering and Petrolia Wagon Works. Ayre also served on the village council for Turtleford and on the local public school board.

After leaving politics, he moved to Regina, where he worked in the office of the Executive Council and then in the parliamentary library from 1939 to 1944. In 1949, Ayre and his wife moved to Petrolia, Ontario.
