= John Houston Laird =

Canadian politician

John Houston Laird (September 18, 1874 – 1959) was a railway conductor and political figure in Saskatchewan. He represented Moose Jaw City from 1934 to 1938 in the Legislative Assembly of Saskatchewan as a Liberal.

He was born in Cavendish, Prince Edward Island, the son of James Laird and Margaret Houston, and was educated at Prince of Wales College. In 1904, Laird married a Miss Derront. He worked for the Canadian Pacific Railway. He was also a Mason of a high degree and a member of the Order of Railway Conductors. Laird lived in Moose Jaw.
