= John James Harrop =

Canadian politician and accountant

John James Harrop (1910 – September 22, 1988) was an accountant and political figure in Saskatchewan. He represented Athabasca from 1956 to 1960 in the Legislative Assembly of Saskatchewan as a Co-operative Commonwealth Federation (CCF) member.

He was born in Alameda, Saskatchewan. He worked for the Saskatchewan Wheat Pool. Harrop married Myrtle Salter in 1938. During World War II, he served in the Royal Canadian Air Force. In 1953, he moved to Uranium City where he was employed as a hotel manager, later as a mine manager. Harrop moved to Timmins, Ontario in 1960 where he managed a mine. Less than 6-months later, he returned to Regina, Saskatchewan, where he worked for the Saskatchewan Power Corporation until he retired in 1975.
