= Albert Eugene Whitmore =

Canadian politician

Albert Eugene Whitmore (May 7, 1876 – January 8, 1949) was a merchant, rancher and political figure in Saskatchewan. He represented Milestone in the Legislative Assembly of Saskatchewan from 1908 to 1912 as a Provincial Rights Party member.

He was born in Dunnville, Ontario, the son of John Albert Whitemore, and was educated in Regina, Saskatchewan and at Upper Canada College in Toronto. Whitmore came to Regina with his family in 1880. His father served as postmaster for Regina until his death in 1904. Whitmore ranched near Yellowgrass from 1898 to 1903. In 1901, with his brothers, he established Whitmore Bros. Ltd., which operated a steam laundry and a pharmacy in Regina and were coal merchants, as well as being involved in other areas of business. In 1906, he married Florence Helen Marsh. Whitmore served as president for the Regina Board of Trade in 1908. He organized a mounted rifle squadron and served as its major.

The Whitmore Park area in Regina was formerly the site of the family farm. Regina Whitmore Park was a former provincial electoral district in Saskatchewan.
