= Bob Wooff =

Canadian politician

Robert Hanson Wooff (May 7, 1900 – March 23, 1992) was an English-born farmer and political figure in Saskatchewan. He represented Turtleford from 1944 to 1948, from 1952 to 1956, from 1960 to 1961 and from 1964 to 1971 in the Legislative Assembly of Saskatchewan as a Co-operative Commonwealth Federation (CCF) and then New Democratic Party (NDP) member.

He was born in Dunoops Bridge, Yorkshire, the son of Isaac Wooff and Ann Brennand, and came to Canada with his family in 1906. Wooff was educated in Emmaville, Saskatchewan and went on to study agriculture at the University of Saskatchewan. In 1930, he married Elin Larson. He farmed in the Turtleford district.

Wooff was defeated by Leo Trippe when he ran for reelection to the provincial assembly in 1948; he defeated Trippe in the general election that followed in 1952. He was defeated by Frank Foley when he ran for reelection in 1956. Wooff was reelected in the 1960 general election but that election was overturned after an appeal and he was defeated in the by-election that followed in 1961.

Wooff retired from politics in 1971 and from farming in 1974. He died in Turtleford at the age of 91.
