= South Qu'Appelle =

Former provincial electoral district in Saskatchewan, Canada

South Qu'Appelle is a former provincial electoral division for the Legislative Assembly of the province of Saskatchewan, Canada. The district was created before the 1st Saskatchewan general election in 1905, and abolished before the 8th Saskatchewan general election in 1934 into Qu'Appelle-Wolseley and parts of Lumsden and Francis. It was the riding of former Premier of the North-West Territories and Saskatchewan Opposition leader Frederick Haultain.

It is now part of the constituencies of Indian Head-Milestone and Regina Wascana Plains.

== Members of the Legislative Assembly ==
#	MLA	Served	Party
1.	Frederick Haultain	1905 – 1912	Provincial Rights, Conservative
2.	Joseph Glenn	Dec. 1912 – 1921	Conservative
3.	Donald H. McDonald	1921 – 1925	Independent - Conservative
4.	Anton Huck	1925 – 1934	Liberal

== Election results ==
1905 Saskatchewan general election: South Qu'Appelle
Party	Candidate	Votes	%	±%
Provincial Rights	Frederick William Gordon Haultain	1,568	58.55%	–
Liberal	Frank B. Moffet	1,110	41.45%	–
Total		2,678	100.00%	

1908 Saskatchewan general election: South Qu'Appelle
Party	Candidate	Votes	%	±%
Provincial Rights	Frederick William Gordon Haultain	1,056	58.54%	-0.01
Liberal	Eli W. Williamson	748	41.46%	+0.01
Total		1,804	100.00%	

1912 Saskatchewan general election: South Qu'Appelle
Party	Candidate	Votes	%	±%
Conservative	Frederick William Gordon Haultain	753	51.72%	-6.82
Liberal	David Railton	703	48.28%	+6.82
Total		1,456	100.00%	

December 4, 1912 By-Election: South Qu'Appelle
Party	Candidate	Votes	%	±%
Conservative	Joseph Glenn	759	50.53%	-1.19
Liberal	David Railton	743	49.47%	+1.19
Total		1,502	100.00%	

1917 Saskatchewan general election: South Qu'Appelle
Party	Candidate	Votes	%	±%
Conservative	Joseph Glenn	1,524	56.36%	+5.83
Liberal	David Railton	1,180	43.64%	-5.83
Total		2,704	100.00%	

1921 Saskatchewan general election: South Qu'Appelle
Party	Candidate	Votes	%	±%
Independent	Donald H. McDonald	1,883	57.36%	+1.00
Liberal	Anton Huck	1,400	42.64%	-1.00
Total		3,283	100.00%	

1925 Saskatchewan general election: South Qu'Appelle
Party	Candidate	Votes	%	±%
Liberal	Anton Huck	1,589	50.70%	+8.06
Independent Conservative	Donald H. McDonald	1,545	49.30%	-8.06
Total		3,134	100.00%	

1929 Saskatchewan general election: South Qu'Appelle
Party	Candidate	Votes	%	±%
Liberal	Anton Huck	1,879	57.23%	+6.53
Conservative	William Levi Wait	1,404	42.77%	-6.53
Total		3,283	100.00%	

== See also ==
- List of Saskatchewan provincial electoral districts
- List of Saskatchewan general elections
- Canadian provincial electoral districts
- South Qu'Appelle — North-West Territories territorial electoral district (1870–1905)
