= George Levi Crane =

American physician

- Born: George Levi Crane; 24 May 1891; Wisconsin
- Died: September 8, 1952 (aged 61)
- Occupation: Doctor

George Levi Crane (May 24, 1891 – September 8, 1952) was an American-born medical doctor and political figure in Saskatchewan. He represented Weyburn from 1938 to 1944 in the Legislative Assembly of Saskatchewan as a Liberal.

He was born in Wisconsin, the son of George W. Crane and Mary Elizabeth Clement, came to Canada in 1903 and received his M.D. from the University of Manitoba. Crane served with the Princess Patricia's Canadian Light Infantry during World War I and was wounded. In 1923, he married a Miss Kathleen Lambe. Dr. Crane lived in Radville, Saskatchewan. After leaving politics, he served as chief pension examiner for the federal department of Veterans Affairs.
