= Frank Keim Malcolm =

Canadian politician and farmer

Frank Keim Malcolm (April 3, 1893 – June 19, 1973) was a farmer and political figure in Saskatchewan. He represented Milestone from 1944 to 1948 in the Legislative Assembly of Saskatchewan as a Co-operative Commonwealth Federation (CCF) member.

He was born in Toronto, Ontario, the son of John A. Malcolm and Mary J. Walton, and was educated in London, Ontario and St. Thomas. In 1916, Malcolm married Ethel M. Dean. He also worked as a plumber, a probation officer and was a minister. Malcolm ran unsuccessfully as a Farmer-Labour candidate for the Gravelbourg seat in the provincial assembly in a 1935 by-election.
