= William Franklin Kerr =

Canadian politician

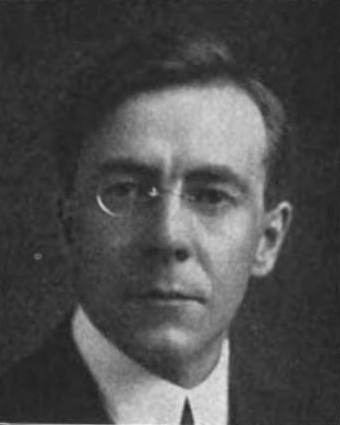

Member of the Legislative Assembly of Saskatchewan
- In office 1938–1944
- Constituency: Turtleford

Member of the Legislative Assembly of Saskatchewan
- In office 1934–1938
- Constituency: Regina City

Personal details
- Born: October 25, 1876 Goderich, Ontario
- Died: March 11, 1968 (aged 91) Regina, Saskatchewan
- Political party: Liberal
- Spouse: Sara W. Sharman (m. 1904)
- Occupation: Journalist, politician

William Franklin Kerr (October 25, 1876 – March 11, 1968) was a journalist and political figure in Saskatchewan. He represented Regina City from 1934 to 1938 and Turtleford from 1938 to 1944 in the Legislative Assembly of Saskatchewan as a Liberal.

== Biography ==
He was born in Goderich, Ontario, the son of Dawson Kerr and Frances E. Hale, and was educated in St. Thomas, Ontario. He began work as a telegraph delivery boy for the Canadian Pacific Railway and later worked in the telegraph office for the Canadian House of Commons. In 1898, Kerr went west and worked for three years with the Winnipeg Free Press, before moving to Regina, Saskatchewan in 1902 to become editor of the Weekly Leader. In 1904, he married Sara W. Sharman. The Post became a daily in 1905. In the same year, Kerr became owner of the newspaper and retained control until August 1920. At that time, he was named commissioner for the Canadian Red Cross in Saskatchewan. In 1924, he became Legislative Librarian and Commissioner of Publications for Saskatchewan. Kerr served in the provincial cabinet as Minister of Natural Resources and Minister of Highways and Transportation. He was defeated when he ran for reelection to the assembly in 1944.

After leaving politics, he served on the local boards of various organizations including the Young Men's Christian Association (YMCA), the Boy Scouts and the Canadian Institute for the Blind. Kerr died in Regina at the age of 91.
