= Bernard Larson =

Canadian politician

Bernard Larson (also known as Bernhard; December 3, 1859 – January 13, 1923) was a Swedish-born farmer and political figure in Saskatchewan, Canada. He represented Milestone in the Legislative Assembly of Saskatchewan from 1912 to 1923 as a Liberal.

He was born in Goerlof, Sweden, the son of Andrew Larson and Hannah Anderson. Larson served five years in the Swedish Army. He moved to Dakota Territory, USA in 1878. In 1882 he married Minnie Hendrickson. Larson moved to Canada in 1902 and settled on a farm near the current location of Lang, Saskatchewan. He is generally considered the founder of Lang because he was able to convince the Canadian Pacific Railway to locate a railway siding on his land. After his death, he was interred in the Larson Mausoleum, now designated a municipal heritage property by the province.
