= Wally Lorenz =

Canadian politician

MLA for Battleford-Cut Knife
- In office 2003
- Preceded by: Rudi Peters
- Succeeded by: last member

Personal details
- Party: Saskatchewan Party
- Occupation: Real Estate Agent

Wally Lorenz is a former Canadian politician who served in the Legislative Assembly of Saskatchewan in 2003 as a Saskatchewan Party member for the constituency of Battleford-Cut Knife.

== Career ==
Lorenz was elected to represent the riding of Battleford-Cut Knife as a member of the Saskatchewan Party in a by-election on March 17, 2003. The riding had been left vacant following the death of Rudi Peters. However, the riding was redistributed and he lost his party's nomination in the new electoral district of Cut Knife-Turtleford to Michael Chisholm. Lorenz holds the distinction of having the shortest term as an MLA, as he served only six months in the position.

Lorenz also served as the mayor of Wilkie, Saskatchewan. He is currently working as a real estate agent.
