= John Alexander Merkley =

Canadian politician

John Alexander Merkley (June 16, 1877 – 1946) was a political figure in Saskatchewan. He represented Moose Jaw City in the Legislative Assembly of Saskatchewan from 1929 to 1934 as a Conservative.

He was born in Iroquois, Ontario, the son of Charles Merkley and Elizabeth Irvine, and was educated there. In 1906, Merkley married Gertrude Mary Milne. He was an employee of the Canadian Pacific Railway. Merkley served in the provincial cabinet as Provincial Secretary and Minister of Railways, Labour and Industries. He was defeated when he ran for reelection to the Saskatchewan assembly in 1934.
