= William Erskine Knowles =

Canadian politician

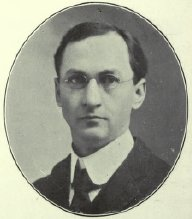

Member of the Canada Parliament for Assiniboia West
- In office 1906–1908
- Preceded by: Thomas Walter Scott

Member of the Canada Parliament for Moose Jaw
- In office 1908–1917
- Succeeded by: James Alexander Calder

Member of the Legislative Assembly of Saskatchewan for Moose Jaw City
- In office 1918–1921
- In office 1925–1927

Personal details
- Born: November 28, 1872 Alliston, Ontario, Canada
- Died: July 17, 1951 (aged 78)
- Party: Liberal
- Other political affiliations: Saskatchewan Liberal Party
- Cabinet: Minister of Telephones (1919-1921); Provincial Secretary (1918-1921)

William Erskine Knowles (November 28, 1872 – July 17, 1951) was a Canadian politician.

Born in Alliston, Ontario, Knowles was educated at Osgoode Hall Law School in Toronto, Ontario. A lawyer by profession, he was first elected to the House of Commons of Canada for the electoral district of Assiniboia West in a by-election held on February 6, 1906. A Liberal, he was re-elected in 1908 and 1911 for the electoral district of Moose Jaw. He did not run in 1917. From 1918 to 1927, he was a member of the Legislative Assembly of Saskatchewan. From 1918 to 1921, he was the Provincial Secretary and from 1919 to 1921 he was the Minister of Telephones. He attempted a federal comeback in the 1921 and 1923 elections but was defeated.

Knowles resigned his seat in the Saskatchewan assembly in 1927 after he was named a judge.

== Electoral results (partial) ==
1925 Saskatchewan general election: Moose Jaw City
Party	Candidate	Votes	%	Elected
Labour–Liberal	William George Baker	4,704	32.83%	✓
Liberal	William Erskine Knowles	4,095	28.58%	✓
Conservative	James Pascoe	2,809	19.60%	
Conservative	Netson Ross Craig	2,722	18.99%	
Total		14,330	100.00%	

By-election: On Mr. Scott's resignation to enter provincial politics in Saskatchewan, 29 August 1905.

By-election on 6 February 1906
Party	Candidate	Votes
Liberal	William Erskine Knowles	acclaimed
