= Robert Sterritt Leslie =

Canadian politician

Robert Sterritt Leslie (April 25, 1875 – 1958) was a Presbyterian minister and political figure in Saskatchewan, Canada. He represented Weyburn in the Legislative Assembly of Saskatchewan from 1929 to 1934 as a member of the Progressive Party.

He was born in St. Marys, Ontario, the son of John Leslie and Mary Standish, and was educated at St. Mary's College and the University of Manitoba. In 1905, he married Mattie Cross. Leslie was speaker for the Saskatchewan assembly from 1930 to 1934.

He served as pastor for Knox Presbyterian Church in Weyburn.
