= Battleford-Cut Knife =

Former provincial electoral district in Saskatchewan, Canada

Coordinates: 52°38′N 109°07′W

Battleford-Cut Knife was a provincial electoral district for the Legislative Assembly of Saskatchewan, Canada. This constituency was created by the merging of parts of the Cut Knife-Lloydminster and The Battlefords electoral districts before the 1995 Saskatchewan general election. The Representation Act, 2002 (Saskatchewan) redistributed this riding into the Cut Knife-Turtleford and a revived The Battlefords electoral districts for the 2003 Saskatchewan general election.

== Member of the Legislative Assembly ==
#	MLA	Served	Party
1.	Sharon Murrell	1995 – 1999	New Democratic Party
2.	Rudi Peters	1999 – 2003	Saskatchewan Party
3.	Wally Lorenz	2003	Saskatchewan Party

== Election results ==
Saskatchewan General Election 1995: Battleford-Cut Knife
Party	Candidate	Votes	%	±%
New Democratic	Sharon Murrell	2,961	40.90	–
Liberal	Jock MacNell	2,184	30.16	–
Prog. Conservative	Eileen Sword	1,940	26.79	–
Independent	Leona Tootoosis	154	2.12	–
Total		7,239	100.00	

Saskatchewan General Election 1999: Battleford-Cut Knife
Party	Candidate	Votes	%	±%
Saskatchewan	Rudi Peters	3,107	45.77	–
New Democratic	Sharon Murrell	2,438	35.92	-4.98
Liberal	Gary B. McArthur	1,242	18.29	-11.87
Total		6,787	100.00	

March 17, 2003 By-Election: Battleford-Cut Knife
Party	Candidate	Votes	%	±%
Saskatchewan	Wally Lorenz	2,946	58.45	-
New Democratic	Gordon Yarde	1,609	31.93	-
Liberal	Larry Ingram	485	9.62	-
Total		5,040	48.92	

== See also ==
- List of Saskatchewan provincial electoral districts
- List of Saskatchewan general elections
- Canadian provincial electoral districts
