= Colin Maxwell (politician) =

Canadian politician

Colin Maxwell (December 16, 1943 – July 6, 2018) is a Scottish-born former educator and political figure in Saskatchewan, Canada. He represented Turtleford from 1982 to 1990 in the Legislative Assembly of Saskatchewan as a Progressive Conservative.

He was born in Tillicoultry and was educated at the Scottish School of Physical Education, the Jordanhill College of Education and the University of Regina, where he received a BEd. In 1966, he married Cherry Harvey and came to Canada soon afterwards. Maxwell taught elementary school, lectured at university and was a high school principal. He also served as mayor of Spiritwood.

Maxwell served in the Saskatchewan cabinet as Minister of Advanced Education and Manpower, as Minister of Culture and Recreation and as Minister of Parks and Renewable Resources. While he held the latter post, more than 1.75 million acres of Crown land were designated under the Critical Wildlife Habitat Protection Act. Maxwell resigned from cabinet in 1990 and resigned from the assembly soon afterwards.

He then moved to Ottawa, where he became executive vice-president of the Canadian Wildlife Federation (CWF). Maxwell retired as CWF executive vice-president in 2007.
