= Moose Jaw City =

Former provincial electoral district in Saskatchewan, Canada

Coordinates: 50°23′45″N 105°32′05″W

Moose Jaw City was a provincial electoral district in the Canadian province of Saskatchewan. This constituency existed from 1905 to 1967 when it was divided into Moose Jaw North and Moose Jaw South (Wakamow). It was the riding of Opposition leader Wellington Willoughby.

From 1921 to 1967 Moose Jaw City elected two representatives to the Legislature. Plurality block voting was used in this period.

== Election results ==
For years with multiple winners, names of successful candidates are in bold.

1905 Saskatchewan general election: Moose Jaw City electoral district
Party	Candidate	Votes	%	±%
Provincial Rights	John Henry Wellington	464	53.15%	–
Liberal	Oswald Baynes Fysh	409	46.85%	–
Total		873	100.00%	

1908 Saskatchewan general election: Moose Jaw City electoral district
Party	Candidate	Votes	%	±%
Provincial Rights	John Henry Wellington	763	50.49%	-2.66
Liberal	John Robert Green	682	45.14%	-1.71
Independent	Oswald Baynes Fysh	66	4.37%	–
Total		1,511	100.00%	

1912 Saskatchewan general election: Moose Jaw City electoral district
Party	Candidate	Votes	%	±%
Conservative	Wellington Willoughby	951	52.83%	+2.34
Liberal	Edward Charles Matthews	791	43.95%	-1.19
Independent	Harry Peters	58	3.22%	-1.15
Total		1,800	100.00%	

1917 Saskatchewan general election: Moose Jaw City electoral district
Party	Candidate	Votes	%	±%
Conservative	Wellington Willoughby	1,621	41.07%	-11.76
Liberal	William Gladstone Ross	1,328	33.65%	-10.30
Labour	William George Baker	998	25.28%	–
Total		3,947	100.00%	

June 10, 1918 By-Election: Moose Jaw City electoral district
Party	Candidate	Votes	%	±%
Liberal	William Erskine Knowles	1,958	56.12%	+22.47
Labour	William George Baker	1,531	43.88%	+18.60
Total		3,489	100.00%	

1921 Saskatchewan general election: Moose Jaw City - 2 members elected
Party	Candidate	Votes	%	±%
Labour	**William George Baker**	3,132	26.43%	
Independent Conservative	**James Pascoe**	2,924	24.67%	
Liberal	Edward Murray Thompson	2,921	24.65%	
Liberal	Harold Fletcher	2,141	18.07%	
Independent	Hugh McKellar	733	6.18%	
Total		11,851	100.00%	

1925 Saskatchewan general election
Party	Candidate	Votes	%	Elected
Labour–Liberal	William George Baker	4,704	32.83%	✓
Liberal	William Erskine Knowles	4,095	28.58%	✓
Conservative	James Pascoe	2,809	19.60%	
Conservative	Netson Ross Craig	2,722	18.99%	
Total		14,330	100.00%	

May 17, 1927 By-Election: Moose Jaw City - Seat #2
Party	Candidate	Votes	%	±%
Liberal	**William Gladstone Ross**	3,922	62.96%	-
Conservative	Robert Henry Smith	2,307	37.04%	-
Total		6,229	100.00%	

1929 Saskatchewan general election: Moose Jaw City - 2 members elected
Party	Candidate	Votes	%	±%
Conservative	**John Alexander Merkley**	4,372	26.12%	
Conservative	**Robert Henry Smith**	4,209	25.14%	
Liberal-Labour	William George Baker	4,181	24.97%	–
Liberal	William Gladstone Ross	3,980	23.77%	
Total		16,742	100.00%	

September 30, 1929 By-Election: Moose Jaw City - Seat #1
Party	Candidate	Votes	%	±%
Conservative	John Alexander Merkley	Acclaimed	100.00%	
Total		Acclamation		

1934 Saskatchewan general election
Party	Candidate	Votes	%	Elected
Liberal	William Gladstone Ross	4,928	25.55%	✓
Liberal	John Houston Laird	4,403	22.83%	✓
Conservative	John Alexander Merkley	2,440	12.65%	
Conservative	James W. Hawthorne	2,319	12.02%	
Farmer–Labour	Waldo D. Summers	2,013	10.44%	
Farmer–Labour	Hugh Gordon	1,765	9.15%	
Labour	William George Baker	1,420	7.36%	
Total		19,288	100.00%	

1938 Saskatchewan general election: Moose Jaw City - 2 members elected
Party	Candidate	Votes	%	±%
Liberal	**William Gladstone Ross**	4,830	25.62%	-
Liberal	**William George Baker**	4,728	25.08%	-
Social Credit	John W. Corman	2,689	14.26%	–
Social Credit	William J. Passmore	2,465	13.07%	–
Conservative	John Alexander Merkley	2,137	11.34%	-
Conservative	Arthur W. E. Fawkes	2,005	10.63%	-
Total		18,854	100.00%	

1944 Saskatchewan general election: Moose Jaw City - 2 members elected
Party	Candidate	Votes	%	±%
CCF	**John W. Corman**	6,296	30.69%	-
CCF	**D. Henry R. Heming**	5,894	28.73%	-
Liberal	Harold W. Pope	2,887	14.07%	-
Liberal	William George Baker	2,881	14.05%	-
Prog. Conservative	Russell L. Brownridge	1,271	6.20%	-
Prog. Conservative	Hugh A. Tiers	1,036	5.05%	-
Social Credit	Frank E. Talbot	249	1.21%	-
Total		20,514	100.00%	

1948 Saskatchewan general election: Moose Jaw City - 2 members elected
Party	Candidate	Votes	%	±%
CCF	**John W. Corman**	7,534	30.06%	-
CCF	**D. Henry R. Heming**	7,331	29.26%	-
Independent	H. Gordon Young	5,240	20.91%	-
Independent	J. Fraser McClellan	4,955	19.77%	-
Total		25,060	100.00%	

1952 Saskatchewan general election: Moose Jaw City - 2 members elected
Party	Candidate	Votes	%	±%
CCF	**John W. Corman**	7,555	33.67%	-
CCF	**D. Henry R. Heming**	7,527	33.54%	-
Liberal	Alfred J. Wickens	3,718	16.57%	-
Liberal	Boris Dubinsky	3,640	16.22%	-
Total		22,440	100.00%	

1956 Saskatchewan general election: Moose Jaw City - 2 members elected
Party	Candidate	Votes	%	±%
CCF	**D. Henry R. Heming**	6,936	24.99%	-
CCF	**William Davies**	6,756	24.34%	-
Independent	Richard N. Lillico	4,522	16.29%	-
Liberal	Kay E. Moffat	3,742	13.48%	-
Social Credit	Sydney Smith	2,404	8.66%	-
Social Credit	John W. Vail	2,188	7.88%	-
Prog. Conservative	C. T. McConnell	1,017	3.67%	-
Independent	W. E. Rogers	192	0.69%	-
Total		27,757	100.00%	

1960 Saskatchewan general election: Moose Jaw City - 2 members elected
Party	Candidate	Votes	%	±%
CCF	**William Davies**	6,794	22.44%	-
CCF	**Gordon Snyder**	6,610	21.83%	-
Liberal	Louis J. Genesove	4,001	13.21%	-
Liberal	Patrick H. McCormick	3,491	11.53%	-
Prog. Conservative	Ralph Bamford	3,253	10.74%	-
Prog. Conservative	Daniel J. Patterson	2,804	9.26%	-
Social Credit	Ralph Forge	1,664	5.50%	-
Social Credit	Ralph Parr	1,661	5.49%	-
Total		30,278	100.00%	

1964 Saskatchewan general election: Moose Jaw City - 2 members elected
Party	Candidate	Votes	%	±%
CCF	**William Davies**	7,749	24.55%	-
CCF	**Gordon Snyder**	7,550	23.92%	-
Prog. Conservative	Daniel J. Patterson	7,115	22.54%	-
Liberal	E. A. Astell	5,455	17.28%	-
Prog. Conservative	Gordon A. Hume	3,697	11.71%	-
Total		31,566	100.00%	

== See also ==
- List of Saskatchewan provincial electoral districts
- List of Saskatchewan general elections
- Canadian provincial electoral districts
- Moose Jaw — North-West Territories territorial electoral district (1870–1905)
