= George Langley (politician) =

Canadian politician

George Langley (November 10, 1852 – August 26, 1933) was an English-born farmer and political figure in Saskatchewan. He represented Redberry from 1905 to 1921 and Cumberland from 1921 to 1922 in the Legislative Assembly of Saskatchewan as a Liberal.

He was born in Essex and came to Canada in 1893, settling near Rosthern, Saskatchewan. Langley later established a farm in the Maymont area. He served on the executive of the Saskatchewan Grain Growers Association from 1910 to 1917 and was also a member of the executive for the Saskatchewan Cooperative Elevator Company, serving as president from 1921 to 1924. He was also a strong supporter of the Canadian Wheat Board. Langley was defeated when he ran for reelection in 1921 but was elected in a deferred election for Cumberland held later that year. He served in the provincial cabinet as Minister of Municipal Affairs from 1912 to 1921. Langley resigned from cabinet in 1921 at the request of Premier William Martin after Langley attempted to put pressure on a Saskatchewan magistrate. He resigned from the assembly in 1922. He ran unsuccessfully as an independent Liberal in 1929. Langley died on his farm near Maymont at the age of 80.
