= Robert Menzies Mitchell =

Canadian politician

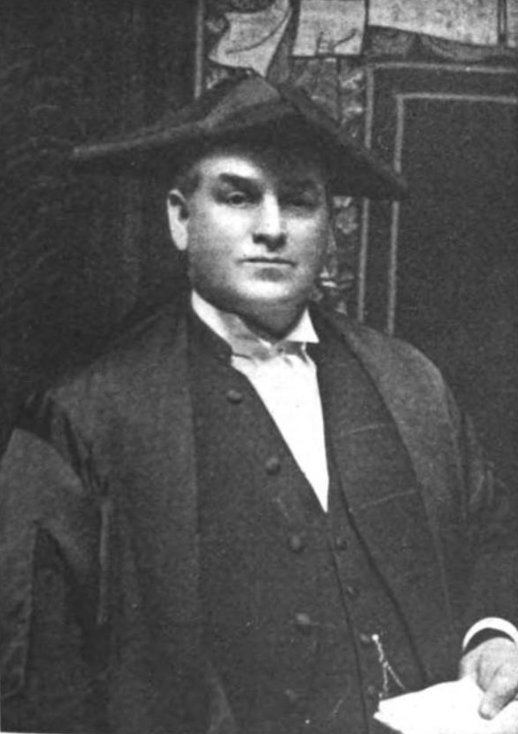

Member of the Legislative Assembly of Saskatchewan
- In office 1908–1919
- Constituency: Weyburn

Personal details
- Born: October 28, 1865 Pickering, Canada West
- Died: February 6, 1932 (aged 66) Weyburn, Saskatchewan
- Party: Liberal
- Spouse: Margaret McKinnon (m. 1902)
- Education: Trinity University
- Occupation: Physician, politician

Robert Menzies Mitchell (October 28, 1865 – February 6, 1932) was a physician and political figure in Saskatchewan, Canada. He represented Weyburn in the Legislative Assembly of Saskatchewan from 1908 to 1919 as a Liberal.

== Biography ==
He was born in Pickering, Canada West, the son of James Mitchell and Elizabeth Rogers, and was educated in Orangeville and at Trinity University in Toronto, where he received an M.D. in 1892. Mitchell practised seven years in Dundalk. In 1899, he came to Indian Head, Saskatchewan, later setting up practice in Weyburn. Mitchell also opened a drug store. He also served as quarantine inspector along the Soo Line from 1901 to 1902. In 1902, he married Margaret McKinnon. Mitchell was mayor of Weyburn from 1904 to 1907. He also served as chairman of the school board. He retired from practice in 1907. Mitchell served as Speaker of the Legislative Assembly of Saskatchewan from 1917 to 1919. He was named superintendent of the provincial mental hospital at Weyburn Mental Hospital in 1919.

He died at his office in Weyburn on February 6, 1932.
