= Milestone (electoral district) =

Former provincial electoral district in Saskatchewan, Canada

Coordinates: 50°00′N 104°45′W

Milestone is a former provincial electoral district for the Legislative Assembly of the province of Saskatchewan, Canada, south of Regina. Originally named "South Regina", this constituency was one of 25 created for the 1st Saskatchewan general election in 1905; although a riding of that name had been contested in the North-West Territories since 1888. It was dissolved and merged with the Bengough district (as Bengough-Milestone) and parts of Thunder Creek and Qu'Appelle before the 18th Saskatchewan general election in 1975.

It is now part of the constituency of Indian Head-Milestone.

== Members of the Legislative Assembly ==
#	MLA	Served	Party
1.	James Alexander Calder	1905 – 1908	Liberal
2.	Albert Eugene Whitmore	1908 – 1912	Provincial Rights
3.	Bernard Larson	1912 – 1923	Liberal
4.	Frederick Lewis	Nov. 1923 – 1929	Liberal
5.	Joseph Patterson	1929 – 1934	Independent, Conservative
6.	William Pedersen	1934 – 1944	Liberal
7.	Frank Malcolm	1944 – 1948	CCF
8.	Jacob Erb	1948 – 1964	CCF
9.	Cyril MacDonald	1964 – 1975	Liberal

== Election results ==
1905 Saskatchewan general election: South Regina electoral district
Party	Candidate	Votes	%	±%
Liberal	James Alexander Calder	872	52.15%	–
Provincial Rights	James Benjamin Hawkes	800	47.85%	–
Total		1,672	100.00%	

1908 Saskatchewan general election: Milestone electoral district
Party	Candidate	Votes	%	±%
Provincial Rights	Albert Eugene Whitmore	1,097	51.55%	+3.70
Liberal	James Alexander Calder	1,031	48.45%	-3.70
Total		2,128	100.00%	

1912 Saskatchewan general election: Milestone electoral district
Party	Candidate	Votes	%	±%
Liberal	Bernard Larson	1,050	54.95%	+3.40
Conservative	Thomas John How	861	45.05%	-3.40
Total		1,911	100.00%	

1917 Saskatchewan general election: Milestone electoral district
Party	Candidate	Votes	%	±%
Liberal	Bernard Larson	1,779	53.18%	-1.77
Independent	James Balfour	1,566	46.82%	–
Total		3,345	100.00%	

1921 Saskatchewan general election: Milestone electoral district
Party	Candidate	Votes	%	±%
Liberal	Bernard Larson	Acclaimed	100.00%	
Total		Acclamation		

October 29, 1923 By-Election: Milestone electoral district
Party	Candidate	Votes	%	±%
Liberal	Frederick Lewis	1,816	56.12%	-
Progressive	Joseph Patterson	1,420	43.88%	–
Total		3,236	100.00%	

1925 Saskatchewan general election: Milestone electoral district
Party	Candidate	Votes	%	±%
Liberal	Frederick Lewis	1,577	48.08%	-8.04
Progressive	Anthony McClelland	863	26.31%	-17.57
Conservative	Arthur Edward Westbrook	840	25.61%	-
Total		3,280	100.00%	

1929 Saskatchewan general election: Milestone electoral district
Party	Candidate	Votes	%	±%
Independent	Joseph Patterson	2,913	59.80%	-
Liberal	William Pedersen	1,958	40.20%	-7.88
Total		4,871	100.00%	

1934 Saskatchewan general election: Milestone electoral district
Party	Candidate	Votes	%	±%
Liberal	William Pedersen	1,991	44.60%	+4.40
Conservative	Joseph Patterson	1,365	30.58%	-29.22
Farmer-Labour	E. Blaine Moats	1,108	24.82%	–
Total		4,464	100.00%	

1938 Saskatchewan general election: Milestone electoral district
Party	Candidate	Votes	%	±%
Liberal	William Pedersen	2,820	47.79%	+3.19
Independent	Sam Horner	2,451	41.53%	-
Social Credit	Sam Horton	630	10.68%	–
Total		5,901	100.00%	

1944 Saskatchewan general election: Milestone electoral district
Party	Candidate	Votes	%	±%
CCF	Frank Malcolm	3,302	59.94%	-
Liberal	William Pedersen	2,207	40.06%	-7.73
Total		5,509	100.00%	

1948 Saskatchewan general election: Milestone electoral district
Party	Candidate	Votes	%	±%
CCF	Jacob Erb	2,803	45.31%	-14.63
Liberal-Progressive Conservative	Lionel Aston	2,363	38.20%	–
Social Credit	George M. Howell	1,020	16.49%	-
Total		6,186	100.00%	

1952 Saskatchewan general election: Milestone electoral district
Party	Candidate	Votes	%	±%
CCF	Jacob Erb	3,558	51.63%	+6.32
Liberal	John M. Heffley	2,982	43.28%	-
Social Credit	John R. Schmidt	351	5.09%	-11.40
Total		6,891	100.00%	

1956 Saskatchewan general election: Milestone electoral district
Party	Candidate	Votes	%	±%
CCF	Jacob Erb	2,839	44.00%	-7.63
Liberal	Bernard Murphy	2,410	37.35%	-5.93
Social Credit	Zack Geib	1,203	18.65%	+13.56
Total		6,452	100.00%	

1960 Saskatchewan general election: Milestone electoral district
Party	Candidate	Votes	%	±%
CCF	Jacob Erb	2,397	40.72%	-3.28
Liberal	Cyril MacDonald	2,159	36.67%	-0.68
Social Credit	Garth Boesch	928	15.76%	-2.89
Prog. Conservative	John R. McMorris	403	6.85%	-
Total		5,887	100.00%	

1964 Saskatchewan general election: Milestone electoral district
Party	Candidate	Votes	%	±%
Liberal	Cyril MacDonald	2,568	46.16%	+9.49
CCF	James M. Hubbs	1,972	35.45%	-5.27
Prog. Conservative	Leonard F. Westrum	1,023	18.39%	+11.54
Total		5,563	100.00%	

1967 Saskatchewan general election: Milestone electoral district
Party	Candidate	Votes	%	±%
Liberal	Cyril MacDonald	2,491	49.61%	+3.45
NDP	Fred F. Petruic	1,920	38.24%	+2.79
Prog. Conservative	J.K. Glenn	610	12.15%	-6.24
Total		5,021	100.00%	

1971 Saskatchewan general election: Milestone electoral district
Party	Candidate	Votes	%	±%
Liberal	Cyril MacDonald	2,671	52.75%	+3.14
NDP	Edna Bradley	2,393	47.25%	+9.01
Total		5,064	100.00%	

== See also ==
- List of Saskatchewan provincial electoral districts
- List of Saskatchewan general elections
- Canadian provincial electoral districts
- South Regina — North-West Territories territorial electoral district (1870–1905).
- Milestone, Saskatchewan
