= James Albert Cross =

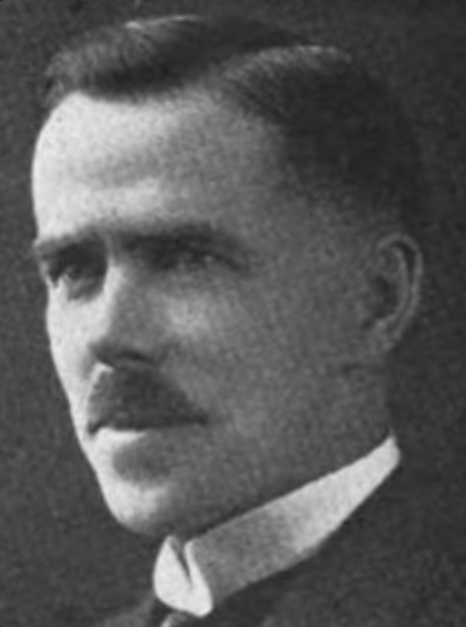

Member of the Legislative Assembly of Saskatchewan
- In office 1925–1929
- Constituency: Willow Bunch

Member of the Legislative Assembly of Saskatchewan
- In office 1921–1925
- Constituency: Regina City

Personal details
- Born: December 11, 1876; Caledonia Springs, Ontario
- Died: March 1, 1952 (aged 75); Ottawa, Ontario
- Political party: Liberal
- Occupation: Lawyer, politician

James Albert Cross, CMG, DSO, QC (December 11, 1876 – March 1, 1952) was a lawyer and political figure in Saskatchewan. He was a soldier's representative in the Legislative Assembly of Saskatchewan from 1917 to 1921, then represented Regina City from 1921 to 1925 and Willow Bunch from 1925 to 1929 in the Saskatchewan assembly as a Liberal.

== Biography ==
He was born in Caledonia Springs, Ontario and went to Regina, Saskatchewan in 1898, studying law with James Balfour and Frederick Haultain. Cross was called to the Saskatchewan bar in 1905 and was named King's Counsel in 1916. He served four years on the Regina Public School board including one year as chairman. Cross served overseas during World War I and was awarded the Distinguished Service Order. He returned to the practice of law in 1919.

He was elected to the Saskatchewan Legislature in 1921 as one of two MLAs to sit for the Regina City provincial constituency. Cross served in the provincial cabinet as Attorney-General.

He was defeated when he ran for reelection in 1925 but was elected for Willow Bunch in a by-election held later that year.

From 1939 to 1948, Cross was chief commissioner for the Air Transport Board. He was appointed a Companion of the Order of St Michael and St George in 1946.

He died in Ottawa on March 1, 1952.
