= Joseph Nolin =

Canadian politician

Member of the Legislative Assembly of Saskatchewan for Athabasca
- In office 1908–1917

Member of the Legislative Assembly of Saskatchewan for Île-à-la-Crosse
- In office 1917–1925

Personal details
- Born: Joseph Octave Nolin; 1868 Bottineau, Dakota Territory
- Died: December 1925 (aged 56–57) Regina, Saskatchewan
- Party: Liberal Party of Saskatchewan

Joseph Octave Nolin (1868 – December 1925) was a Canadian provincial politician and one of Saskatchewan's first Metis MLAs.

He was the Liberal member of the Legislative Assembly of Saskatchewan for the constituencies of Île-à-la-Crosse and Athabasca, the latter only existing from 1908 to 1917—making Nolin the only representative of the former electoral district. From 1917 until 1925 he represented the riding of Île-à-la-Crosse.

== Life ==
He was born to Joseph Nolin and Marianne Gaudry in Bottineau, Dakota Territory; however, the family later moved to Manitoba. Joseph and his brother Norbert settled in Battleford, Saskatchewan. Nolin was fluent in French, English and Cree.

In 1891, he married Marie Villeneuve. Nolin was a farmer and rancher at Meota and Jackfish Lake. He worked on the construction of Saskatchewan Highway 4 and served as captain for the Battleford Steam Ferry until a bridge was built across the North Saskatchewan River.

He died in office in Regina.
