= 5th Saskatchewan Legislature =

The 5th Legislative Assembly of Saskatchewan was elected in the Saskatchewan general election held in June 1921. The assembly sat from December 8, 1921, to May 9, 1925. The Liberal Party led by William Melville Martin formed the government. After Martin retired in 1922, Charles Avery Dunning became Liberal party leader and Premier. The former leader of the Conservative Party, Donald Maclean had left politics to serve as a judge shortly before the election. The opposition in the assembly was unorganized and there was no official opposition leader in 1921 or 1922. Independent member John Archibald Maharg served as leader of the opposition in 1923 and Harris Turner, also independent, served as opposition leader in 1924 and 1925.

George Adam Scott served as speaker for the assembly.

== Members of the Assembly ==
The following members were elected to the assembly in 1921:

| Electoral district | Member | Party | First elected / previously elected | No.# of term(s) |
|---|---|---|---|---|
| Arm River | George Adam Scott | Liberal | 1908 | 4th term |
| Bengough | Thomas Evan Gamble | Liberal | 1917 | 2nd term |
| Biggar | John Meikle | Progressive | 1921 | 1st term |
| Cannington | Robert Douglas | Liberal | 1921 | 1st term |
| Cannington | Albert Edward Steele (1924) | Liberal | 1924 | 1st term |
| Canora | H.P. Albert Hermanson | Liberal | 1912 | 3rd term |
| Cumberland | George Langley (Note: Langley was acclaimed on August 9, 1921) | Liberal | 1905, (Note: Redberry) 1922 | 5th term* |
| Cumberland | Deakin Hall (1922) | Liberal | 1913, 1922 | 3rd term* |
| Cut Knife | William Hamilton Dodds | Liberal | 1917 | 2nd term |
| Cypress | Henry Theodore Halvorson | Liberal | 1921 | 1st term |
| Elrose | Wilbert Hagarty | Liberal | 1921 | 1st term |
| Estevan | Robert Dunbar | Liberal | 1918 | 2nd term |
| Francis | Walter George Robinson | Liberal | 1912 | 3rd term |
| Gravelbourg | William James Cummings | Independent | 1921 | 1st term |
| Hanley | Ernest Redford Ketcheson | Liberal | 1921 | 1st term |
| Happyland | Stephen Morrey | Liberal | 1917 | 2nd term |
| Happyland | Franklin Shortreed (1922) | Liberal | 1922 | 1st term |
| Humboldt | Henry Mathies Therres | Liberal | 1921 | 1st term |
| Île-à-la-Crosse (Note: date of polling was August 18, 1921) | Joseph Octave Nolin | Liberal | 1908 | 4th term |
| Jack Fish Lake | Donald M. Finlayson | Liberal | 1908 | 4th term |
| Kerrobert | John Albert Dowd | Liberal | 1917 | 2nd term |
| Kindersley | Wesley Harper Harvey | Progressive | 1919 | 2nd term |
| Kinistino | John Richard Parish Taylor | Liberal | 1917 | 2nd term |
| Last Mountain | Samuel John Latta | Liberal | 1912 | 3rd term |
| Lloydminster | Robert James Gordon | Liberal | 1917 | 2nd term |
| Lumsden | William John Vancise | Liberal | 1917 | 2nd term |
| Maple Creek | Peter Lawrence Hyde | Liberal | 1921 | 1st term |
| Melfort | George Balfour Johnston | Liberal | 1908 | 4th term |
| Milestone | Bernard Larson | Liberal | 1912 | 3rd term |
| Milestone | Frederick Birthall Lewis (1923) | Liberal | 1923 | 1st term |
| Moose Jaw City | William George Baker | Labour | 1921 | 1st term |
| Moose Jaw City | James Pascoe | Independent Conservative | 1921 | 1st term |
| Moose Jaw County | Charles Avery Dunning | Liberal | 1916 | 3rd term |
| Moosomin | John Louis Salkeld | Conservative | 1917 | 2nd term |
| Morse | John Archibald Maharg | Independent pro-Government | 1921 | 1st term |
| North Qu'Appelle | James Garfield Gardiner | Liberal | 1914 | 3rd term |
| Notukeu | George Spence | Liberal | 1917 | 2nd term |
| Pelly | Sarah Katherine Ramsland | Liberal | 1919 | 2nd term |
| Pheasant Hills | James Arthur Smith | Liberal | 1917 | 2nd term |
| Pipestone | William John Patterson | Liberal | 1921 | 1st term |
| Prince Albert | Charles M. McDonald | Liberal | 1917 | 2nd term |
| Redberry | George Cockburn | Independent | 1921 | 1st term |
| Regina City | William Melville Martin | Liberal | 1916 | 3rd term |
| Regina City | James Albert Cross | Liberal | 1917 | 2nd term |
| Regina City | Donald McNiven (1922) | Liberal | 1922 | 1st term |
| Rosetown | John Andrew Wilson | Liberal | 1921 | 1st term |
| Rosthern | John Michael Uhrich | Liberal | 1921 | 1st term |
| Saltcoats | George William Sahlmark | Liberal | 1918 | 2nd term |
| Saskatoon City | Harris Turner | Independent | 1917 | 2nd term |
| Saskatoon City | Archibald Peter McNab | Liberal | 1908 | 4th term |
| Saskatoon County | Charles Agar | Progressive | 1921 | 1st term |
| Shellbrook | Edgar Sidney Clinch | Liberal | 1915 | 3rd term |
| Souris | John Patrick Gordon | Conservative | 1921 | 1st term |
| South Qu'Appelle | Donald Hogarth McDonald | Independent | 1921 | 1st term |
| Swift Current | David John Sykes | Independent | 1917 | 2nd term |
| The Battlefords | Allan Demetrius Pickel | Liberal | 1917 | 2nd term |
| Thunder Creek | William John Finley Warren | Progressive | 1921 | 1st term |
| Tisdale | Hugh Evan Jones | Liberal | 1917 | 2nd term |
| Touchwood | John Mason Parker | Liberal | 1917 | 2nd term |
| Turtleford | Archibald B. Gemmell | Liberal | 1917 | 2nd term |
| Vonda | James Hogan | Liberal | 1917 | 2nd term |
| Wadena | William Henry McKinnon | Progressive | 1921 | 1st term |
| Weyburn | Charles McGill Hamilton | Liberal | 1919 | 2nd term |
| Wilkie | Sidney Bingham | Progressive | 1921 | 1st term |
| Willow Bunch | Abel James Hindle | Liberal | 1917 | 2nd term |
| Wolseley | William George Bennett | Independent | 1921 | 1st term |
| Wynyard | George Wilson Robertson | Independent | 1921 | 1st term |
| Yorkton | Thomas Garry | Liberal | 1905 | 5th term |
| Yorkton | Wilhelm Hans Paulson (1924) | Liberal | 1912, 1924 | 3rd term* |

== Party standings ==
| Affiliation | Members |
|---|---|
| Liberal | 45 |
| Independent | 7 |
| Progressive | 6 |
| Conservative Party of Saskatchewan | 2 |
| Independent Conservative | 1 |
| Independent pro-Government | 1 |
| Labour | 1 |
| Total | 63 |
| Government Majority | 27 |

== By-elections ==
By-elections were held to replace members for various reasons:

| Electoral district | Member elected | Party | Election date | Reason |
|---|---|---|---|---|
| Regina City | James Albert Cross | Liberal | April 25, 1922 | Ran for reelection after being named to cabinet |
| North Qu'Appelle | James Garfield Gardiner | Liberal | June 5, 1922 | Ran for reelection after being named to cabinet |
| Rosthern | John Michael Uhrich | Liberal | June 5, 1922 | Ran for reelection after being named to cabinet |
| Happyland | Franklin Robert Shortreed | Liberal | June 26, 1922 | Stephen Morrey died in office |
| Cumberland | Deakin Alexander Hall | Liberal | August 21, 1922 | George Langley resigned seat |
| Regina City | Donald Alexander McNiven | Liberal | September 19, 1922 | William Melville Martin named a judge |
| Milestone | Frederick Birthall Lewis | Liberal | October 29, 1923 | Bernard Larson died in office |
| Cannington | Albert Edward Steele | Liberal | June 9, 1924 | Robert Douglas died in office |
| Wynyard | Wilhelm Hans Paulson | Liberal | October 20, 1924 | George Wilson Robertson retired to become Secretary of the Saskatchewan Wheat Pool |
