= 1917 Saskatchewan general election =

Canadian provincial election

| ← 1912 | June 26, 1917 | 1921 → |

62 seats in the Legislative Assembly of Saskatchewan 32 seats needed for a majority
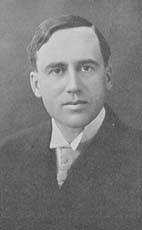
| | First party | Second party |
|---|---|---|
| | | CON |
| Leader | William Martin | Wellington Willoughby |
| Party | Liberal | Conservative |
| Leader since | 1916 | 1912 |
| Leader's seat | Regina City | Moose Jaw City |
| Last election | 45 | 8 |
| Seats won | 51 | 7 |
| Seat change | ▲6 | ▼1 |
| Popular vote | 106,552 | 68,243 |
| Percentage | 56.7% | 36.3% |
| Swing | ▼0.3pp | ▼5.7pp |
Premier before election
William Martin
Liberal
Premier after election
William Martin
Liberal

The 1917 Saskatchewan general election was held on June 26, 1917, to elect members of the Legislative Assembly of Saskatchewan.

After replacing Walter Scott as leader of the Liberal Party of Saskatchewan and premier of the province, William M. Martin led the party to its fourth consecutive victory, winning all but 8 of the 59 seats in the legislature.

The Conservative Party of Wellington Willoughby continued to lose popular support.

This was the first Saskatchewan election in which women were allowed to vote and run for office. However, none were declared elected in this election. The first Saskatchewan woman MLA was elected in a 1918 by-election.

The Non-Partisan League, forerunner of the Progressive Party of Saskatchewan, ran candidates in this election but none were successful. Labour candidates also appeared for the first time.

David John Sykes became the first Independent to sit in the Saskatchewan legislature. He was nominated by the Liberal, Conservative and Non-Partisan League organizations, and was acclaimed to the seat this election.

A separate army ("service") vote was held from October 3 to October 13, 1917 to elect three soldier MLAs. All service candidates were Independent (not affiliated), and those MLAs were elected to represent Saskatchewan residents stationed in France, Belgium and the United Kingdom of Great Britain and Ireland.

== Results ==
| Party | Party Leader | # of candidates | Seats | | | Popular Vote |
| Party | Party Leader | # of candidates | 1912 | Elected | % Change | Votes | % | % Change |
|---|---|---|---|---|---|---|---|---|
| Liberal | William M. Martin | 58 | 46 | 51 | +13.3% | 106,552 | 56.68% | -0.28% |
| Conservative | Wellington Willoughby | 53 | 7 | 7 | – | 68,243 | 36.30% | -5.68% |
| Independent | | 10 | – | 1 | +100% | 4,440 | 2.36% | +1.30% |
| Nonpartisan League | | 7 | * | – | * | 7,267 | 3.87% | * |
| Labour | William Geo. Baker (default) | 2 | * | – | * | 1,474 | 0.79% | * |
| Sub-total | | 130 | 53 | 59 | – | 187,976 | 100% |
| Soldiers' vote (Province at large) | | 14 | * | 3 | * | 13,655 | 6.77% | * |
| Total | | 144 | 53 | 62 | +11.3% | 201,631 | 100% |
Source: Elections Saskatchewan

Note:* Party did not nominate candidates in previous election.

=== Percentages ===
Popular vote
| Liberal | 56.68% |
| Conservative | 36.30% |
| Others | 7.02% |

Seats summary
| Liberal | 82.26% |
| Conservative | 11.29% |
| Others | 6.45% |

== Members of the Legislative Assembly elected ==
For complete electoral history, see individual districts

4th Saskatchewan Legislative Assembly
| District | Member | Party |
|---|---|---|
| Arm River | George A. Scott | Liberal |
| Bengough | Thomas Gamble | Liberal |
| Biggar | George H. Harris | Liberal |
| Cannington | John D. Stewart | Liberal |
| Canora | Albert Hermanson | Liberal |
| Cumberland | Deakin Alexander Hall | Liberal |
| Cut Knife | William Dodds | Liberal |
| Cypress | Isaac Stirling | Liberal |
| Elrose | Archibald McNab | Liberal |
| Estevan | George Bell | Liberal |
| Francis | Walter Robinson | Liberal |
| Hanley | Macbeth Malcolm | Liberal |
| Happyland | Stephen Morrey | Liberal |
| Humboldt | William Turgeon | Liberal |
| Île-à-la-Crosse | Joseph Nolin | Liberal |
| Jack Fish Lake | Donald Finlayson | Liberal |
| Kerrobert | John Dowd | Liberal |
| Kindersley | William R. Motherwell | Liberal |
| Kinistino | John R. Taylor | Liberal |
| Last Mountain | Samuel Latta | Liberal |
| Lloydminster | Robert J. Gordon | Liberal |
| Lumsden | William Vancise | Liberal |
| Maple Creek | Alexander Colquhoun | Liberal |
| Melfort | George B. Johnston | Liberal |
| Milestone | Bernard Larson | Liberal |
| Moose Jaw City | Wellington Willoughby | Conservative |
| Moose Jaw County | Charles Dunning | Liberal |
| Moose Mountain | Robert Magee | Liberal |
| Moosomin | John Salkeld | Conservative |
| Morse | Malcolm L. Leitch | Liberal |
| North Qu'Appelle | James Garfield Gardiner | Liberal |
| Notukeu | George Spence | Liberal |
| Pelly | Magnus Ramsland ^{1} | Liberal |
| Pheasant Hills | James Arthur Smith | Liberal |
| Pipestone | Richard Phin | Liberal |
| Prince Albert | Charles M. McDonald | Liberal |
| Redberry | George Langley | Liberal |
| Regina City | William Martin | Liberal |
| Rosetown | William Badger | Conservative |
| Rosthern | William Bashford | Liberal |
| Saltcoats | James Alexander Calder | Liberal |
| Saskatoon City | Donald Maclean | Conservative |
| Saskatoon County | Murdo Cameron | Liberal |
| Shellbrook | Edgar Clinch | Liberal |
| Souris | William Fraser | Conservative |
| South Qu'Appelle | Joseph Glenn | Conservative |
| Swift Current | David Sykes | Independent |
| The Battlefords | Allan Pickel | Liberal |
| Thunder Creek | Andrew Gallaugher | Conservative |
| Tisdale | Hugh Jones | Liberal |
| Touchwood | John M. Parker | Liberal |
| Turtleford | Archibald Gemmell | Liberal |
| Vonda | James Hogan | Liberal |
| Wadena | John MacMillan | Liberal |
| Weyburn | Robert Mitchell | Liberal |
| Wilkie | Reuben Martin | Liberal |
| Willow Bunch | Abel Hindle | Liberal |
| Wynyard | Wilhelm Paulson | Liberal |
| Yorkton | Thomas Garry | Liberal |

=== Notes ===
^{1} Magnus Ramsland died in 1918. In the resulting by-election, he was succeeded by his widow Sarah Ramsland, the first woman ever elected to the Legislative Assembly of Saskatchewan.

== October 13, 1917 service vote results ==
Like other provinces Saskatchewan held a service vote – actually two separate votes – for Saskatchewan residents in the Canadian armed services fighting during World War I. The first vote was for France and Belgium – two members were elected in a block vote; the top member represented France and the second member elected represented Belgium. Another member was also elected to represent troops in Great Britain. Three seats in the Legislature were set aside for these soldier-MLAs.

=== France and Belgium ===
| Candidate | Votes | % | elected |
|---|---|---|---|
| Private Harris Turner | 3,938 | | France |
| Captain Frederick Bagshaw | 1,791 | | Belgium |
| Lt. Col. Alexander Ross | 978 | | |
| Private Kenneth Crawford | 798 | | |
| Sergeant William Reade | 577 | | |
| Sapper John Arthur Gibson | 379 | | |
| Major Robert Henry Smith | 365 | | |
| Sgt. Major William Harry Wilson | 233 | | |
| Lieutenant Alfred Haigh | 216 | | |

=== Great Britain ===
| Candidate | Votes | % |
|---|---|---|
| Lt. Col. James Albert Cross | 2,698 | |
| Captain Alfred Manville | 691 | |
| Sergeant Arthur Eaton | 504 | |
| Sergeant Samuel Barraclough | 273 | |
| Captain Daniel Lochead | 214 | |

== See also ==
- List of political parties in Saskatchewan
- List of Saskatchewan provincial electoral districts
