= 8th Saskatchewan Legislature =

The 8th Legislative Assembly of Saskatchewan was elected in the Saskatchewan general election held in June 1934. The assembly sat from November 15, 1934, to May 14, 1938. The Liberal Party led by James Garfield Gardiner formed the government. After Gardiner resigned to join the federal cabinet in November 1935, William John Patterson became party leader and premier. The Farmer-Labour Group, subsequently known as the Co-operative Commonwealth Federation and led by George Hara Williams, formed the official opposition.

John Mason Parker served as speaker for the assembly.

== Members of the Assembly ==
The following members were elected to the assembly in 1934:

Electoral district	Member	Party	First elected / previously elected	No.# of term(s)
Arm River	Gustaf Herman Danielson	Liberal	1934	1st term
Athabasca (Note: Election held July 24, 1934)	Deakin Alexander Hall	Liberal	1913, 1922	6th term*
Bengough	James Bidwell Smith	Liberal	1934	1st term
Biggar	Robert Pelham Hassard	Liberal	1925, 1934	2nd term*
Bromhead	Norman Leslie McLeod	Liberal	1931	2nd term
Cannington	William John Patterson	Liberal	1921	4th term
Cut Knife	Andrew James Macauley	Farmer-Labour Group	1934	1st term
Elrose	John Andrew Wilson	Liberal	1921, (Note: Rosetown) 1934	3rd term*
Francis	Charles Morton Dunn	Liberal	1929	2nd term
Gravelbourg	Benjamin Franklin McGregor	Liberal	1925	3rd term
Gravelbourg	Edward Milton Culliton (1935)	Liberal	1935	1st term
Gull Lake	Herman Henry Kemper	Farmer-Labour Group	1934	1st term
Hanley	Charles Agar	Liberal	1921	4th term
Humboldt	James Hogan	Liberal	1917	5th term
Humboldt	James Chisholm King (1935)	Liberal	1935	1st term
Kelvington	George Ernest Dragan	Liberal	1934	1st term
Kerrobert	Donald Laing	Liberal	1926, 1934	2nd term*
Kindersley	Louis Henry Hantelman	Farmer-Labour Group	1934	1st term
Kinistino	John Richard Parish Taylor	Liberal	1917, 1933	4th term*
Last Mountain	Guy Hartsel Hummel	Liberal	1934	1st term
Lumsden	Henry Phillip Mang	Liberal	1934	1st term
Maple Creek	John Joseph Mildenberger	Liberal	1934	1st term
Meadow Lake	Donald MacDonald	Liberal	1934	1st term
Melfort	John Duncan MacFarlane	Liberal	1934	1st term
Melville	James Garfield Gardiner	Liberal	1914	6th term
Melville	Ernest Walter Gerrand (1935)	Liberal	1935	1st term
Milestone	William Pedersen	Liberal	1934	1st term
Moose Jaw City	William Gladstone Ross	Liberal	1927, 1934	2nd term*
Moose Jaw City	John Houston Laird	Liberal	1934	1st term
Moose Jaw County	Thomas Waddell	Liberal	1926, 1934	2nd term*
Moosomin	Arthur Thomas Procter	Liberal	1934	1st term
Morse	Neil John MacDonald	Liberal	1934	1st term
Notukeu	George Spence	Liberal	1917, 1927	6th term*
Pelly	Reginald John Marsden Parker	Liberal	1929	2nd term
Pheasant Hills	Asmundur Loptson	Liberal	1929	2nd term
Prince Albert	Thomas Clayton Davis	Liberal	1925	3rd term
Qu'Appelle-Wolseley	Frederick Middleton Dundas	Liberal	1934	1st term
Regina City	Percy McCuaig Anderson	Liberal	1934	1st term
Regina City	William Franklin Kerr	Liberal	1934	1st term
Rosetown	Neil McVicar	Liberal	1934	1st term
Rosthern	John Michael Uhrich	Liberal	1921	4th term
Saskatoon City	James Wilfred Estey	Liberal	1934	1st term
Saskatoon City	George Wesley Norman	Liberal	1934	1st term
Shaunavon	Clarence Stork	Farmer-Labour Group	1934	1st term
Shellbrook	Omer Alphonse Demers	Liberal	1934	1st term
Souris-Estevan	Jesse Pichard Tripp	Liberal	1925, 1934	2nd term*
Swift Current	James Gordon Taggart	Liberal	1934	1st term
The Battlefords	John Albert Gregory	Liberal	1934	1st term
Thunder Creek	Robert Scott Donaldson	Liberal	1925, 1934	2nd term*
Tisdale	Harvie James Dorrance	Liberal	1934	1st term
Touchwood	John Mason Parker	Liberal	1917	5th term
Turtleford	Charles Arthur Ayre	Liberal	1929	2nd term
Wadena	George Hara Williams	Farmer-Labour Group	1934	1st term
Watrous	Bertram Gilroy Clement	Liberal	1934	1st term
Weyburn	Hugh Elliott Eaglesham	Liberal	1934	1st term
Wilkie	John Jardine	Liberal	1934	1st term
Willow Bunch	Charles William Johnson	Liberal	1929	2nd term
Yorkton	Vincent Reynolds Smith	Liberal	1934	1st term

== Party Standings ==
Affiliation	Members
Liberal	50
Farmer-Labour Group	5
Total	55
Government Majority	45

== By-elections ==
By-elections were held to replace members for various reasons:

Electoral district	Member elected	Party	Election date	Reason
Humboldt	James Chisholm King	Liberal	November 19, 1935	J Hogan died in January, 1935
Gravelbourg	Edward Milton Culliton	Liberal	November 26, 1935	B F McGregor died in 1935
Regina City	William Franklin Kerr	Liberal	December 2, 1935	WF Kerr ran for reelection after being named to cabinet
Melville	Ernest Walter Gerrand	Liberal	December 9, 1935	JG Gardiner named to federal cabinet
