= John Andrew Wilson =

Canadian politician

Member of the Saskatchewan Legislative Assembly for Elrose
- In office 1934–1938
- Preceded by: James Cobban
- Succeeded by: Louis Henry Hantelman

Member of the Saskatchewan Legislative Assembly for Rosetown
- In office 1921–1929
- Preceded by: William Thompson Badger
- Succeeded by: Nathaniel Given

Personal details
- Party: Liberal

John Andrew Wilson was a Canadian politician from the province of Saskatchewan. He represented Elrose and Rosetown as a Liberal on the Legislative Assembly from 1921 to 1938.

Wilson defeated Conservative MPP William Thompson Badger in the 1921 Saskatchewan general election.

== See also ==
- 5th Saskatchewan Legislature
- 6th Saskatchewan Legislature
- 8th Saskatchewan Legislature
