= Shortreed =

Shortreed is a surname. Notable people with the surname include:

- Franklin Robert Shortreed (1875–1954), Canadian politician
- Susan Shortreed, American biostatistician

== See also ==
- Shortreed Elementary School, in Langley, British Columbia, Canada
