= Progressive Conservative Party of Saskatchewan leadership elections =

This page shows the results of leadership elections in the Progressive Conservative Party of Saskatchewan, Canada, (known as the Conservative Party of Saskatchewan until the mid-1940s). The 1994 convention was determined by a "one member, one vote" system of balloting; all previous conventions were determined by delegated conventions.

== 1905 Provincial Rights leadership convention ==
(Held on August 23, 1905.)

- Frederick W. A. G. Haultain acclaimed

== 1924 Conservative leadership convention ==
(Held on March 25, 1924.)

- James T. M. Anderson acclaimed

== 1936 Conservative leadership convention ==
(Held on October 28, 1936.)

- John Diefenbaker acclaimed

== 1942 Conservative leadership convention ==
(Held on June 18, 1942.)

- KEOWN H.E. elected
- BURROWS, C.H.J.

(Note: The vote totals do not appear to have been announced.)

== 1944 Progressive Conservative leadership convention ==
(Held on February 15, 1944.)

- Rupert Ramsay acclaimed

== 1949 Progressive Conservative leadership convention ==
(Held on October 12, 1949.)

- Alvin Hamilton
- HUDSON, Ed

(Note: The vote totals were not announced, although Hamilton is believed to have won in a landslide.)

== 1958 Progressive Conservative leadership convention ==
(Held on October 28, 1958).

First ballot:

- Martin Pederson 369
- Gib Eamer 283
- M.A. Sandy MacPherson 238

Second ballot:

- Martin Pederson 536
- Gib Eamer 313

== 1970 Progressive Conservative leadership convention ==
(Held on February 28, 1970.)

- Ed Nasserden
- Martin Clary

(Note: The vote totals were not released. 250 votes were cast, in total.)

== 1973 Progressive Conservative leadership convention ==
(Held on March 18, 1973.)

- Dick Collver
- Roy Bailey

(Note: The vote totals were not released, and there were wildly conflicting unofficial reports as to the size of Collver's victory (ranging from 67% ballot support to a mere 16-vote difference). A total of 495 ballots were cast in total.)

== 1979 Progressive Conservative leadership convention ==
(Held on November 9, 1979.)

- Grant Devine 418
- Graham Taylor 201
- Paul Emile Rousseau 74

== 1994 Progressive Conservative leadership convention ==
A leadership election was held on Saturday, November 19, 1994, to elect a replacement for party leader Grant Devine. The election was held by computerized telephone, with the system being developed by the Maritime Telegraph and Telephone Company. Farmer and legislative freshman Bill Boyd won the leadership election against attorney and former cabinet minister Grant Schmidt with 60% of the vote on a platform of restoring the party's right-wing values and condemning the previous leader Devine's government.

Boyd received endorsements from five of the nine other Progressive Conservative MLAs (John Edwin Britton, Dan D'Autremont, Jack Goohsen, Harold Martens, and William Neudorf), three did not disclose their support (Gerald Muirhead, Richard Swenson, and former Premier Grant Devine), and Don Toth was undecided as of November 18.

=== Results ===
Candidate	Votes	%
Bill Boyd	1,985	60.17%
Grant Schmidt	1,313	39.81%
Total	3,298	100.00%

36.05% of the party's 9,146 members participated in the election.

=== Aftermath ===
At the next general election in 1995, the Progressive Conservatives won 17.92% of the vote, cutting their seat count down to just five, losing its status as the Official Opposition to the Liberals. Boyd himself won a majority of 2,042 in his riding of Kindersley. This was the last leadership election before the formation of the modern Saskatchewan Party.

== See also ==
- Progressive Conservative Party of Saskatchewan
- Leadership convention
