= Charles Agar (politician) =

Canadian politician

Member of the Saskatchewan Legislative Assembly for Hanley
- In office 1934–1944
- Preceded by: Reginald Stipe
- Succeeded by: Jim Aitken

Member of the Saskatchewan Legislative Assembly for Saskatoon County
- In office 1921–1934
- Preceded by: Murdo Cameron

Personal details
- Born: September 5, 1882 Belfast, Ontario, Canada
- Died: January 4, 1962 (aged 79) Saskatoon, Saskatchewan, Canada
- Party: Liberal; Progressive Party of Saskatchewan
- Occupation: Farmer

Charles Durnin Agar (September 5, 1882 – January 4, 1962) was a farmer and political figure in Saskatchewan, Canada. He represented Saskatoon County from 1921 to 1934 as a Progressive Party member then as a Liberal and Hanley from 1934 to 1944 as a Liberal in the Legislative Assembly of Saskatchewan.

== Biography ==
Agar was born in Belfast, Ontario, (located in what is now Ashfield-Colborne-Wawanosh), was educated in Ontario and came to Saskatchewan in 1905. He was Speaker of the Legislative Assembly of Saskatchewan from 1938 to 1944. Agar was defeated when he ran for reelection in the 1944 Saskatchewan election that brought Tommy Douglas and the Saskatchewan CCF to power.

He died in Saskatoon at the age of 79.
