= Wynyard (provincial electoral district) =

Former provincial electoral district in Saskatchewan, Canada

Coordinates: 51°45′N 104°05′W

Wynyard is a former provincial electoral district for the Legislative Assembly of the province of Saskatchewan, Canada, centred on the town of Wynyard. The district was created before the 3rd Saskatchewan general election in 1912 as "Quill Plains". Renamed "Wynyard" in 1917, the constituency was abolished before the 8th Saskatchewan general election in 1934. It is now part of the Arm River-Watrous and Kelvington-Wadena constituencies.

In the 1924 Wynyard by-election, Dr. T.A. Patrick campaigned for the Progressive Party, with a platform that included a "Saskatchewan first" position and the party having no formal tie to either major party. He also called for the use of single transferable voting, Senate reform, and the completion of the Hudsons Bay railway.

== Members of the Legislative Assembly ==
| # | MLA | Served | Party |
|---|---|---|---|
| 1. | Wilhelm H. Paulson | 1912–1921 | Liberal |
| 2. | George W. Robertson | 1921–1924 | Independent |
| 3. | Wilhelm H. Paulson | Oct. 20, 1924 – 1934 | Liberal |

== Election results ==
1912 Saskatchewan general election: Quill Plains electoral district
| Party | Candidate | Votes | % | ±% |
|---|---|---|---|---|
| Liberal | Wilhelm H. Paulson | 1,281 | 57.68% | – |
| Conservative | Alfred E. Bence | 940 | 42.32% | – |
| Total | | 2,221 | 100.00% | |

1917 Saskatchewan general election: Wynyard electoral district
| Party | Candidate | Votes | % | ±% |
|---|---|---|---|---|
| Liberal | Wilhelm H. Paulson | 2,271 | 59.06% | +1.38 |
| Conservative | John Veum | 1,126 | 29.29% | -13.03 |
| Independent | Benjamin Franklin Bray | 448 | 11.65% | – |
| Total | | 3,845 | 100.00% | |

1921 Saskatchewan general election: Wynyard electoral district
| Party | Candidate | Votes | % | ±% |
|---|---|---|---|---|
| Independent | George W. Robertson | 2,197 | 59.03% | +47.38 |
| Liberal | David B. Musselman | 1,525 | 40.97% | -18.09 |
| Total | | 3,722 | 100.00% | |

October 20, 1924 By-Election: Wynyard electoral district
| Party | Candidate | Votes | % | ±% |
|---|---|---|---|---|
| Liberal | Wilhelm H. Paulson | 2,697 | 61.32% | +20.35 |
| Independent | Egill Jensson Laxdal | 1,701 | 38.68% | -20.35 |
| Total | | 4,398 | 100.00% | |

1925 Saskatchewan general election: Wynyard electoral district
| Party | Candidate | Votes | % | ±% |
|---|---|---|---|---|
| Liberal | Wilhelm H. Paulson | 2,167 | 52.09% | +9.23 |
| Progressive | William Jopling Paul | 1,993 | 47.91% | – |
| Total | | 4,160 | 100.00% | |

1929 Saskatchewan general election: Wynyard electoral district
| Party | Candidate | Votes | % | ±% |
|---|---|---|---|---|
| Liberal | Wilhelm H. Paulson | 2,596 | 49.83% | -2.26 |
| Progressive | Oli Julius Halldorson | 1,491 | 28.62% | -19.29 |
| Conservative | John Janusson | 1,123 | 21.55% | - |
| Total | | 5,210 | 100.00% | |

== See also ==
- List of Saskatchewan provincial electoral districts
- List of Saskatchewan general elections
- Canadian provincial electoral districts
