= John Lyle =

John Lyle may refer to:

- John Lyle (assemblyman), Wisconsin State Assemblyman
- John E. Lyle, Jr. (1910–2003), U.S. Representative from Texas
- John M. Lyle (1872–1945), Canadian architect
- John Percival Lyle (1878–1968), politician in Saskatchewan, Canada
- John Lyle (pilot), U.S. Army Air Force Officer, fighter pilot with the Tuskegee Airmen
- John T. Lyle, professor of landscape architecture at Cal Poly Pomona

== See also ==
- John Lyall, footballer
