= Saskatoon County =

Former provincial electoral district in Saskatchewan, Canada

Coordinates: 52°15′N 106°50′W

Saskatoon County was a provincial electoral division for the Legislative Assembly of the province of Saskatchewan, Canada. Created as "Saskatoon" before the 1st Saskatchewan general election in 1905, the district encompassed the three communities that merged to form the city in 1906. A new urban riding was created for the rapidly growing city in 1908, with the existing rural constituency being redrawn and renamed Saskatoon County for the 2nd Saskatchewan general election. The riding was abolished into the districts of Rosthern and Hanley before the 8th Saskatchewan general election in 1934.

It is now part of the constituencies of Martensville, Saskatoon Southeast, and Rosetown-Elrose.

== Members of the Legislative Assembly ==
#	MLA	Served	Party
1.	William Charles Sutherland	1905 – 1917	Liberal
2.	Murdo Cameron	1917 – 1921	Liberal
3.	Charles Agar	1921 – 1929	Progressive
4.	Charles Agar	1929 – 1934	Liberal

== Election results ==
1905 Saskatchewan general election: Saskatoon
Party	Candidate	Votes	%	±%
Liberal	William Charles Sutherland	957	54.37%	–
Provincial Rights	Hugh Edwin Munroe	803	45.63%	–
Total		1,760	100.00%	

1908 Saskatchewan general election: Saskatoon County
Party	Candidate	Votes	%	±%
Liberal	William Charles Sutherland	781	50.48%	-3.89
Provincial Rights	Paul L. Sommerfeld	766	49.52%	+3.89
Total		1,547	100.00%	

1912 Saskatchewan general election: Saskatoon County
Party	Candidate	Votes	%	±%
Liberal	William Charles Sutherland	922	64.84%	+14.36
Conservative	W.H. Bulmer	500	35.16%	-14.36
Total		1,422	100.00%	

1917 Saskatchewan general election: Saskatoon County
Party	Candidate	Votes	%	±%
Liberal	Murdo Cameron	1,381	64.59%	-0.25
Conservative	Reuben Alfred Locke	757	35.41%	+0.25
Total		2,138	100.00%	

1921 Saskatchewan general election: Saskatoon County
Party	Candidate	Votes	%	±%
Progressive	Charles Agar	1,330	52.14%	–
Liberal	Murdo Cameron	1,221	47.86%	-16.73
Total		2,551	100.00%	

1925 Saskatchewan general election: Saskatoon County
Party	Candidate	Votes	%	±%
Progressive	Charles Agar	1,314	51.07%	-1.07
Liberal	M.D. Worden	1,259	48.93%	+1.07
Total		2,573	100.00%	

1929 Saskatchewan general election: Saskatoon County
Party	Candidate	Votes	%	±%
Liberal	Charles Agar	1,910	47.55%	-1.38
Conservative	George Miller Huffman	1,499	37.31%	-
Progressive	John L. Dobie	608	15.14%	-35.93
Total		4,017	100.00%	

== See also ==
- List of Saskatchewan provincial electoral districts
- List of Saskatchewan general elections
- Canadian provincial electoral districts
- Saskatoon — North-West Territories territorial electoral district (1870–1905)
