= Happyland (provincial electoral district) =

Former provincial electoral district in Saskatchewan, Canada

Coordinates: 50°40′N 109°31′W

Happyland is a former provincial electoral division for the Legislative Assembly of the province of Saskatchewan, Canada. Centred on the town of Leader, this district was named after the Happyland rural municipality.

Created before the 4th Saskatchewan general election in 1917, this constituency was divided and combined with the districts of Kindersley (later Kerrobert-Kindersley) in the north and Maple Creek in the south before the 8th Saskatchewan general election in 1934. This area is now part of the constituencies of Cypress Hills and Kindersley.

== Members of the Legislative Assembly ==
#	MLA	Served	Party
1.	Stephen Morrey	1917–1922	Liberal
2.	Franklin Robert Shortreed	June 26, 1922 – 1925	Liberal
3.	John Joseph Keelan	1925–1929	Liberal
4.	Donald McPherson Strath	1929–1934	Liberal

== Election results ==
1917 Saskatchewan general election: Happyland electoral district
Party	Candidate	Votes	%	±%
Liberal	Stephen Morrey	2,052	48.87%	–
Nonpartisan League	Nichol McVean	1,230	29.29%	–
Conservative	Wilfred Steer	917	21.84%	–
Total		4,199	100.00%	

1921 Saskatchewan general election: Happyland electoral district
Party	Candidate	Votes	%	±%
Liberal	Stephen Morrey	2,603	77.82%	+28.95
Independent	Amos Edwin Botsford Denovan	742	22.18%	–
Total		3,345	100.00%	

June 26, 1922 By-Election: Happyland electoral district
Party	Candidate	Votes	%	±%
Liberal	Franklin Robert Shortreed	2,464	54.34%	-23.48
Independent	A. Edward Duffy	2,070	45.66%	+23.48
Total		4,534	100.00%	

1925 Saskatchewan general election: Happyland electoral district
Party	Candidate	Votes	%	±%
Liberal	John Joseph Keelan	2,427	52.88%	-1.46
Progressive	Thomas L. Baldwin	2,163	47.12%	-
Total		4,590	100.00%	

1929 Saskatchewan general election: Happyland electoral district
Party	Candidate	Votes	%	±%
Liberal	Donald McPherson Strath	2,436	51.27%	-1.61
Independent	William Richard Ducie	2,315	48.73%	-
Total		4,751	100.00%	

== See also ==
- List of Saskatchewan provincial electoral districts
- List of Saskatchewan general elections
- Canadian provincial electoral districts
