= Robert Andrew Heggie =

Canadian politician

Robert Andrew Heggie, QC (May 13, 1915 – July 23, 2000) was a lawyer, judge and political figure in Saskatchewan. He represented Hanley from 1967 to 1971 in the Legislative Assembly of Saskatchewan as a Liberal.

He was born in Strasbourg, Saskatchewan and was educated in Kelliher and at the Regina Normal School. Heggie taught school in Punnichy and Raymore. In 1938, he married Evelyn Rutherford. He served as a radar technician with the Royal Canadian Air Force during World War II. Heggie then attended the University of Saskatchewan, receiving a law degree, and was called to the Saskatchewan bar in 1950. He practised law in Saskatoon and then served as a judge in the Magistrate Court. From 1954 to 1963, he was an alderman for Saskatoon. In 1963, Heggie was named Queen's Counsel. He ran unsuccessfully for one of the Saskatoon City district seats in the Saskatchewan assembly in 1956 and 1960 before being elected for Hanley in 1967. He was defeated by Paul Mostoway when he ran for reelection to the assembly in 1971. In 1979, Heggie moved to the Fraser Valley area where he was a disciplinary court judge in the federal penitentiary system. He died in Abbotsford, British Columbia at the age of 85.
