= Park Manor =

Manor house in Isle of Wight, United Kingdom

Park Manor is a manor house in the parish of Brading on the Isle of Wight.

== History ==
Park is a 300–400 acre holding lying on the north-east boundary of the parish and partly in St. Helens, which came in the 16th century to be termed a manor. It was held with Ruttleston at the close of the 13th century by William de Nevill and his wife Muriel as half a fee of William Russell, lord of Yaverland, and was perhaps the same holding which Amice de Insula (Lisle) granted to William and Muriel in 1271–2. At the beginning of the 14th century Thomas Gatcombe is given as owner of Park. This name should perhaps be Daccombe, as in 1346 John Daccombe and his coparceners were holding half a knight's fee at Park, which had formerly belonged to Thomas 'Lacombe.' In 1428 Elizabeth Lisle was in possession of this estate, which three years later had passed to Henry Lisle. The manor has since followed the same descent as Nettlestone in St. Helens. The courts from the time of Edward VI were held for Park and Nettlestone together.
