= Allan Leonard Frederick Stevens =

Canadian politician

Allan Leonard Frederick Stevens (August 30, 1919 – July 15, 2011) was a farmer and political figure in Saskatchewan, Canada. He represented Rosetown from 1960 to 1964 in the Legislative Assembly of Saskatchewan as a Co-operative Commonwealth Federation (CCF) member.

Stevens was born in Saskatoon, Saskatchewan, the son of William Albert Stevens and Helen Isabel McMann, and was educated in Harris. During World War II, Stevens served overseas with the Royal Canadian Army Service Corps in the Netherlands, Belgium and Germany. In 1945, he married Emily Steinun Strong. Stevens lived in Harris and served as a school trustee and as a member of the village council for Harris. He was defeated by George Loken when he ran for reelection to the provincial assembly in 1964.
