= Kropf =

Kropf is a surname. Notable people with the surname include:

- Barret Kropf, Canadian politician
- Jason Kropf, American politician
- Jeff Kropf (born 1959), American politician
