= Wilbert McIvor =

Canadian politician

Wilbert McIvor (January 11, 1915 – March 22, 1987) was a Canadian farmer and provincial politician. He was the Liberal member of the Legislative Assembly of Saskatchewan for the constituency of Arm River, from 1967 until 1971. As representative of the Arm River riding, he was preceded by Progressive Conservative party leader Martin Pederson and followed by New Democrat Donald Leonard Faris.

He was born on the family homestead near Craik, Saskatchewan and farmed near Girvin. In 1940, McIvor married Faere Old. McIvor was reeve for the rural municipality of Arm River from 1956 to 1968. He also served as vice-president of the Saskatchewan Standard Bred Association. and was defeated by Donald Leonard Faris when he ran for reelection to the provincial assembly in 1971. McIvor died on his farm at the age of 72.
