= Ernest Redford Ketcheson =

Canadian politician

Ernest Redford Ketcheson (November 30, 1875 – August 22, 1938) was a farmer, merchant, civil official and political figure in Saskatchewan. He represented Hanley in the Legislative Assembly of Saskatchewan from 1921 to 1925 as a Liberal.

He was born in Consecon, Ontario, the son of Gilbert Isaac Ketcheson and Eva Derbyshire, and was educated in Ontario and Manitoba. In 1902, he married Lulu Harpold. Ketcheson served as municipal clerk. He lived in Young, Saskatchewan. He was defeated by Reginald Stipe when he ran for reelection to the provincial assembly in 1925.
