= Herb Pinder =

Canadian businessman and politician (1923–2014)

Herbert Charles Pinder Sr., CM (April 26, 1923 — October 30, 2014) was a Canadian business owner, developer and political figure in Saskatchewan. He served as Minister of Industry and Information in the Saskatchewan cabinet from May 1964 to December 1964.

He was born in Saskatoon, the son of Robert Mitford Pinder and Mary Helen Charlotte Rose, and was educated in Saskatoon, at the University of Saskatchewan and the Harvard Graduate School of Business Administration. With his brother Robert Ross, he took over the operation of the family drug store business, Pinder's Drugs, following his father's death. In 1947, he married Shirley Jean Hughes. Pinder was president of the Saskatoon Trading Company and a director of the Saskatoon Drug and Stationery Company. He also was a director of the Royal Bank of Canada, TransCanada PipeLines, Canadian National Railways and John Labatt Ltd. and chair of the Saskatchewan Power Corporation. During World War II, he served in the Royal Canadian Navy Volunteer Reserve, reaching the rank of lieutenant commander. Pinder was a member of the board of governors for the University of Saskatchewan, serving as chairman from 1961 to 1963. He was named to the Order of Canada in 1997.

Pinder ran unsuccessfully for election in Saskatoon City in the 1960 provincial election. Although he was named to the provincial cabinet by Ross Thatcher in 1964, he was narrowly defeated by Robert Walker when he ran for election in Hanley in the 1964 provincial election and in a by-election held for Hanley in December that year.

His son Herbert Jr. later took over the operation of the family business. Pinder's Drugs was sold to Shoppers Drug Mart in 1992. Another son, Gerry Pinder, played professional ice hockey in the NHL and the WHA.
