= Arthur Marcotte =

Canadian politician

Arthur Marcotte (March 8, 1873 – August 18, 1958) was a lawyer and political figure in Saskatchewan, Canada. He sat for Ponteix division in the Senate of Canada from 1931 to 1958 as a Conservative.

He was born in Sault-au-Récolle near Montreal, the son of Hormisdas Marcotte and Célina Beauchamp, and was educated at the Séminaire de Ste-Thérèse and the Université de Montréal. In 1894, he married Hermine Germain. Marcotte served as the secretary to Guillaume-Alphonse Nantel from 1896 to 1897 and then was an accountant in the Quebec Department of Crown Lands until 1904. He was amateur billiards champion of Canada in 1901 and represented Canada in the World Billiards Championship held in New York City. He founded the Académie de Billard Marcotte in Montreal in 1904. Marcotte came to Saskatchewan in 1910 and was admitted to the Regina bar in 1914. He ran unsuccessfully for the Notukeu seat in the provincial assembly in 1912 and 1917 and in the federal riding of Willow Bunch in 1926. Marcotte was president of the Association des professionnels Canadiens-français de la Saskatchewan and vice-president of the Association Franco-canadienne. He died in office at the age of 85. He had been appointed to the Senate by Prime Minister R.B. Bennett.
