= Duncan Selby Hutcheon =

Canadian politician

Duncan Selby Hutcheon (February 16, 1879 – January 11, 1954) was a Canadian provincial politician.

== Early life and career ==
He was born in Alton, Ontario to David Wilton and May (McPhedion) Hutcheon. David Wilton Hutcheon was treasurer of Haultain, Ontario. In 1902, Duncan moved to Pense, Saskatchewan where he farmed for a year before settling in Davidson, Saskatchewan to homestead. However, in 1905 he rented his farm and moved into Davidson. In Davidson, he opened and operated the first Wells Land & Cattle Company elevator, which he operated for five years. He then purchased a hardware store which he ran for three years. In 1913, he became Secretary-Treasurer of the Rural Municipality of Willner, while also selling insurance. He held the office of mayor of Davidson from 1914 until 1922. He also served on the school board and hospital board

Hutcheon was elected as the Conservative member of the Legislative Assembly of Saskatchewan for the constituency of Arm River for a single term, from 1929 until 1934. As representative of the Arm River riding, he was preceded by Liberal Thomas Frederick Waugh and followed by Liberal Gustaf Herman Danielson.

== Personal life ==
Hutcheon married Ruby Sanderson in 1910, and had three children, David, Mary Isabella, and Robert Donald. He was a Mason, a member of the Order of Odd Fellows, and a member of the Union Church.

== Death ==
Hutcheon died in Vancouver on January 11, 1954.

| Preceded by Thomas Frederick Waugh | MLA Arm River; 1929–1934 | Succeeded by Gustaf Herman Danielson |
