= Cephas Mark =

Canadian politician

Cephas Barker Mark (July 31, 1872 – January 5, 1942) was a druggist and political figure in Saskatchewan. He represented Rosetown in the Legislative Assembly of Saskatchewan, from 1912 to 1917, as a Liberal.

Mark was born in Little Britain, Ontario, the son of Joseph Mark and Philippa Netherton. He was educated in Lindsay and at the Toronto School of Pharmacy. In 1904, Cephas Barker Mark married Elizabeth Edith Swain in Mariposa Township, Ontario.

The 1906 Census shows Mark living in Minnedosa, Manitoba. The 1911 Census of Canada shows Mark working as a druggist in Rosetown, Saskatchewan. Mark served one term in the Saskatchewan Legislature and did not run for a second term in the October, 1917 election.

Mark returned to Ontario before 1921 where he farmed and eventually retired.
