= Mariposa Township, Ontario =

Former township in southern Ontario, Canada

Coordinates: 44°19′N 78°53′W

Mariposa Township within Kawartha Lakes

The Township of Mariposa was a municipality located in the southwest corner of the former Victoria County, now the city of Kawartha Lakes, in the Canadian province of Ontario. The other municipal neighbours of Mariposa are Ops and Fenelon on the east, Eldon on the north, Brock on the west, and Scugog on the south, with the latter two located in the Durham Regional Municipality. The former township includes the communities of Little Britain, Manilla, Mariposa, Valentia, and Oakwood. Today, most of the former township is represented in the City of Kawartha Lakes by the Ward 8 Councillor, John Pollard, and Ward 4 Councillor Andrew Veale.

== History ==
Mariposa is the Spanish word for "butterfly" (see mariposa). No record or even legend persists to explain through what whim of early officialdom a backwoods township was so named. The Mariposa township was surveyed in 1820 and formally attached to Durham County, Newcastle District in 1821. In shape, it was originally a rectangle, nine miles from east to west and fifteen from north to south. There was added to it later, however, a broken southern front on Lake Scugog, now known as concessions A, B, C, and D, Mariposa, but formerly attached to the township of Cartwright, which now lies entirely on the south side of the lake. Its superficial area is 75,102 acres. The land surface is moderately undulating, with a very immature drainage system. The chief stream, the Mariposa Brook, (also known variously as Big Creek, Black Creek, Davidson's Creek, and West Cross Creek) rises in swamps near Manilla on the western boundary, flows eight miles northeast to about Lot 18, Concession 13, then turns directly south until it passes Little Britain on Concession 4, and finally turns, east to pass out of the township on the 3rd Concession and empty into the Scugog River in Ops. The meagre flow and gentle current of even this main stream and the consequent lack of any considerable water power is beyond doubt the explanation for the absence of any outstanding village in Mariposa. The soil, however has always surpassed in richness that of any other township in Victoria. Once the heavy timber had been removed, it held, as it still holds, an easy leadership in agricultural prosperity in the former Victoria County.

This well-known fertility of the township resulted in the blocking of general settlement until nearly a decade after the major immigration into Emily. For the Canada Company secured large concessions here; George Strange Boulton of Port Hope, the Family Compact member for Durham, arranged for a rich grant to himself.

For many years, Mariposa was visited annually by these economic parasites, who came in to inspect and invest for speculation, but not to occupy the land. At last in 1827, S. Patterson, of Markham, Ontario, settled near the modern Manilla. Others who located prior to 1830 on land near Manilla which they purchased from the Canada Company at from $1.50 to $2.00 per acre were the Ewings, McLeods, Houghs, McPhersons, Pillings, and Winters. Just before and during 1831, a large contingent of Scotch settlers, chiefly from Argyleshire, poured in along the Eldon boundary on the north. Amongst the families who overflowed on the south side of the line were the Blacks, Calkins, Campbells, Charltons, Copelands, Grants, Irishes, Kinnells, McCrimmons, McCuaigs, McGinnisses, McLeans, Ringlands, Spences and Wicks. In 1831, also, the Edwards and Williams families took up land along the western boundary and one Samuel Dix built his cabin in the hardwood forest near the site of modern Oakwood. His nearest neighbours on the east were at Purdy's Mills (now Lindsay), nearly nine miles away. In this same year, when actual settlers began to increase and set about the improvement of the land, the swarm of speculators became so 'numerous and importunate that the Land Office refused to grant any further locations without an express pledge of settlement. Fortunately, men were not lacking to undertake such pledges. For the next three years, there was a steady immigration of settlers of the very best type, chiefly Canadian born pioneers of the second generation whose fathers had hewn out prosperity in the front townships of Northumberland County and in the former Ontario County townships of Whitchurch and Markham. Most of these families settled in the centre of the township, along the Mariposa Brook. Amongst them were the Armitages, Bacons, Bunnells, Davidsons, DeGeers, Delongs, Dundases, Haights, Hubbells, Lakes, Lloyds, Marks, Minthorns, McNeils, McWilliams, O'Brien's, Penroses, Piersons, Pogues, Readers, Richardsons, Roadhouses, Taylors, Tifts, Waites and Weldons. From 1834 to 1837 a few more families drifted in each year. Prominent amongst those who settled in the eastern part of the township were William Brown, William Bowes, and John Cruse, a Quaker. For many years yet there was little or no communication between the Canadian born settlers in the centre of Mariposa and their Scotch neighbours on the northern border, for a deep tract of difficult forest, held by speculators, intervened. There were likewise very few early settlers in the extreme south of the township.

These pioneers in Mariposa came in from the south and southwest and not via Peterborough, Cavan, or Emily. Supplies were first obtained from Newmarket, then from Prince Albert, on Lake Scugog, and finally from Port Perry. Trade was not opened up with Lindsay until very much later. In the beginning, the nearest post office for the receipt and despatch of mails was at Butcher's Point on Lake Simcoe. Then Prince Albert was for a short time the closest centre for mail, until "Mariposa" post office was opened at what is now Manilla.

By 1850 the population of the township had risen to 1863, only 269 fewer than in 1920. The harvest of that year included 70,000 bushels of wheat, 41,000 bushels of oats, 14,000 bushels of peas, 33,000 bushels of potatoes, 31,000 bushels of turnips, 38,900 pounds (ca. 18 t) of maple sugar, 10,500 pounds (ca. 5 t) of wool, and 4,000 pounds (1.81 t) of butter. This represented, however, only a small portion of the effort of that day, for the great task of each farmer was still the conquest of a virgin forest of oak and maple. Such crops as were exported were teamed in the winter time south to a village (now deserted) called Port Hoover, on the north shore of Lake Scugog, thence across the lake to Caesarea, in Scugog, and south by road to Port Whitby, on Lake Ontario.

Municipal organization in the early thirties was very slight. Louis Winters was the first tax collector and E. R. Irish the first Township Clerk. The personnel of the Magistrate's Court for Mariposa and Eldon combined comprised Messrs. Irish, Ewing, Williams, and Calkins. Samuel Davidson represented Mariposa at Peterborough on the first Council of Colborne District in 1842.

The first Township Council after the Municipal Act of 1849 included:

- Reeve, John Jacobs;
- Councillors, Samuel Davidson, Obadiah Rogers, Robert Whiteside, and William Ramsey;
- Clerk, A. A. McLaughlin;
- Treasurer, James Thorndyke.

A Business Directory of Canada published in 1850, gives the following names in Mariposa:

Coulter's Corners (now Manilla)

- Mary Douglas, Postmistress;
- George Smith, merchant;
- L. McKinnon, carpenter;
- D. McLean, carpenter

Oakwood

- A. A. McLauchlin, Postmaster and inn keeper;
- Thomas Marks, inn keeper.

The Dominion census of 1911 throws interesting light on the population of Mariposa. The chief racial strains represented were:

- English, 2,321
- Irish, 733
- Scottish, 646

The denominational subdivisions were as follows:

- Methodists, 2,678
- Presbyterians, 757
- Anglicans, 125
- Christians, 114
- Baptists, 43
- Roman Catholics, 28

The population of Mariposa has fallen off remarkably during the last generation. From 1871 to 1920, it dropped from 5363 to 3132, a loss of 2231 or over 41 per cent.

The assessed value of real and personal property within the township was set at $2,480,675 in 1886 and at $3,722,995 in 1920. This latter figure is greater than the assessment of Eldon and Emily combined, and more than twice the total value of Somerville, Bexley, Laxton, Carden, Digby, Dalton and Longford.

== Communities ==
Mariposa is easily the most fertile township in Kawartha Lakes. It lacks, however, two of the most efficient factors in the development of village life. There is no abundance of waterpower and no focusing of railroads. The old Indian portage of Onigoning at the rapids in the Scugog River in Ops has had both and has therefore become the site of Lindsay, the only town in the county.

In Mariposa, on the contrary, there have been three small villages, Manilla, Oakwood and Little Britain, none of them incorporated, which have grown up around a post office, a township hall and a small mill respectively. Woodville is an incorporated village on the Eldon boundary but is usually reckoned as belonging to the latter township, even though part of its population has spilled over on the 15th concession of Mariposa. Linden Valley in the northeast, Glandine on the Ops boundary, Valenta in the southeast and Fingerboard in the southwest are former postal hamlets with little more than a church and a smithy. Cresswell is a hamlet on the Whitby-Lindsay division just south of Manilla Junction. Grass Hill is a station on the Coboconk division at the Eldon boundary. A grain warehouse is its chief ornament.

=== Manilla ===
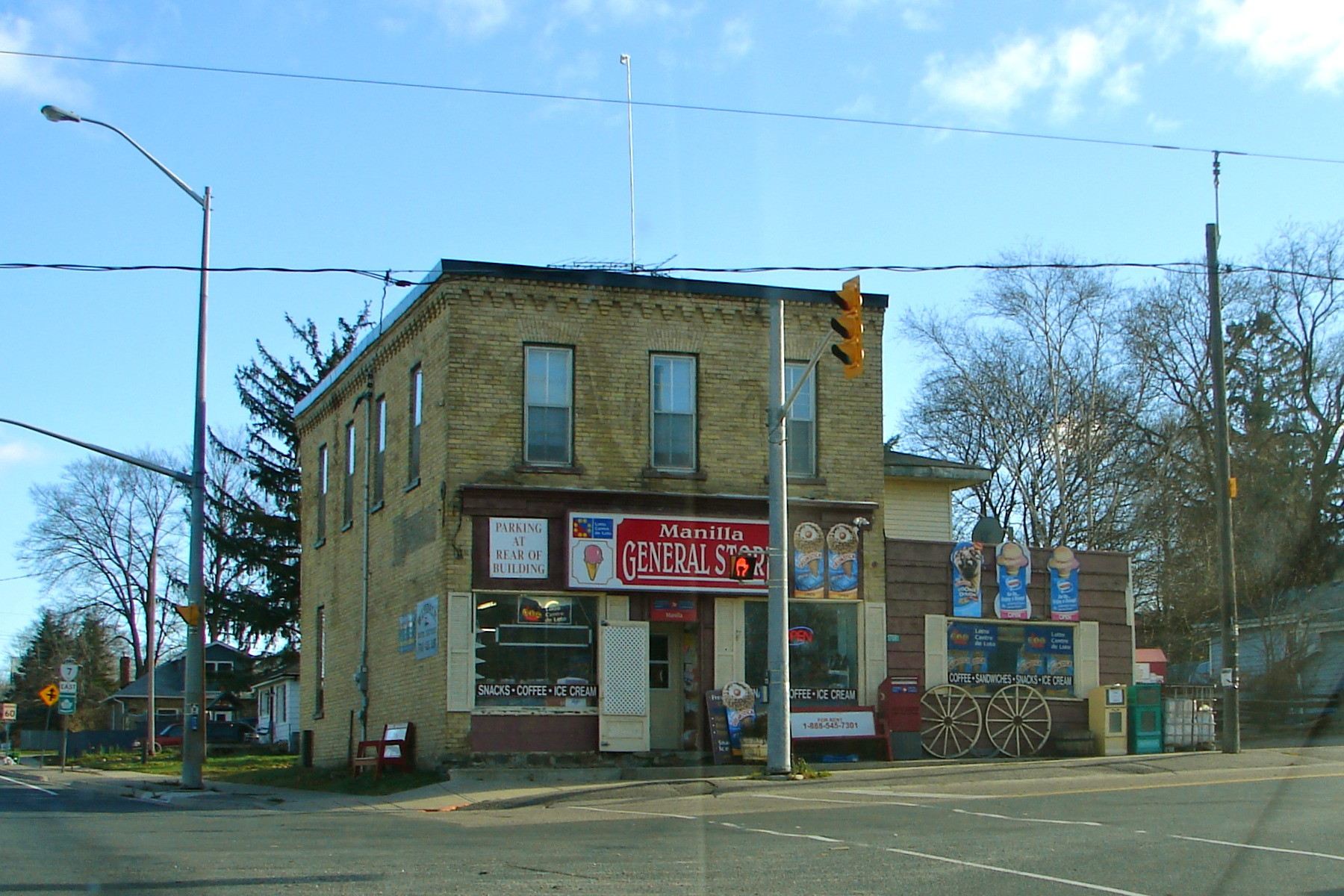
Manilla

Manilla straddles the boundary between Durham Region and the City of Kawartha Lakes on the line between the 8th and 9th Concessions of Mariposa. The beginnings of present village was due to the Post Office that opened up here in 1837 in the log store of Jacob Ham. For six years this was the only Post Office for the township. Soon afterwards the Bible Christians built a church, which was rebuilt of brick in 1871. The Presbyterians built in 1853, the Baptists in 1856, the Congregationalists in 1860, and the Methodists about 1870. A certain amount of trade and industry also gathered about this centre. In 1881 the village boasted a flour mill, run by steam because of the absence of waterpower, a rake factory, and half a dozen stores.

The community went through a succession of names: Ham's Corners after Jacob Ham, the first merchant; Mariposa in 1836; Coulthard's Corners after Thomas Coulthard, who platted a subdivision; and Monticello after a local bible camp. Finally in 1851, a public meeting chose to name the town after Manilla, Indiana.

=== Oakwood ===
Oakwood is situated on blocks off lots 15 and 16 in concessions 8 and 9. The name is derived from the heavy forest of oak which originally covered this neighbourhood. James Tift settled here about 1833 and may therefore be regarded as the father of the village.

In 1843 a Post Office was established with A. McLauchlin as Postmaster. Peter Perry of Whitby opened a store in 1844 and in the following year a Township Hall was built. The Hall has been rebuilt once since that time, but has never ceased to be the municipal focus of the former township. The first tavern or hotel at Oakwood was run by Thomas Marks Banks, who carried on the business for nearly twenty years. The first church was built by the Bible Christians in 1850.

The Episcopal Methodists built five years later, the Canada Methodists in 1858, and the Anglicans in 1860. Oakwood reached the peak of its prosperity in the 1880s. In 1888 its population was about 330. Of that number, there were 75 children between the ages of seven and eleven and 127 between the ages of five and twenty-one. Oakwood took just pride in her young people in those days.

The chief business firm in 1888 was the general store of Hogg Bros., with which was associated a 30,000 bushel grain elevator at Mariposa Station, a mile to the south from the village. To this elevator came Mariposa's export trade in cereals, and its clover seed, which has gained a wide reputation. Hogg Bros. also managed the Post Office and telegraph office.

Other units in the commercial aggregate were A. Cameron's general store, M. N. Anderson's tailor shop, William Brunker's hotel, Alfred Lake's machinery depot, Thomas Staples' blacksmith and carriage works, Nicholas Hill's blacksmith and carriage works, George Humphrey's carriage works, W. H. Harper's harness shop, and Robert Broad's hardware store. Prominent citizens of that day were, James Thorndyke, J. F. Cunnings, Robert Webster Sr., William Webster, Jesse Weldon Sr., W. A. Silverwood, John Coad, David King, Richard Hancock, and A. Lake.

The first mile of concession road east from the village is bisected at right angles by Mariposa Brook at what is known as East Oakwood. The neighbourhood of this intersection, was once busy with tanning and gristing, but by 1888 a brick yard and a livery stable were all its boast. The next cross roads to the east again was known as Taylor's Corners. Here the Hon. S. C. Wood, before the days of his political bloom, did business in "The Stone Store." In the eighties John Maunder and William Wakeley manufactured wagons and carriages here.

=== Little Britain ===
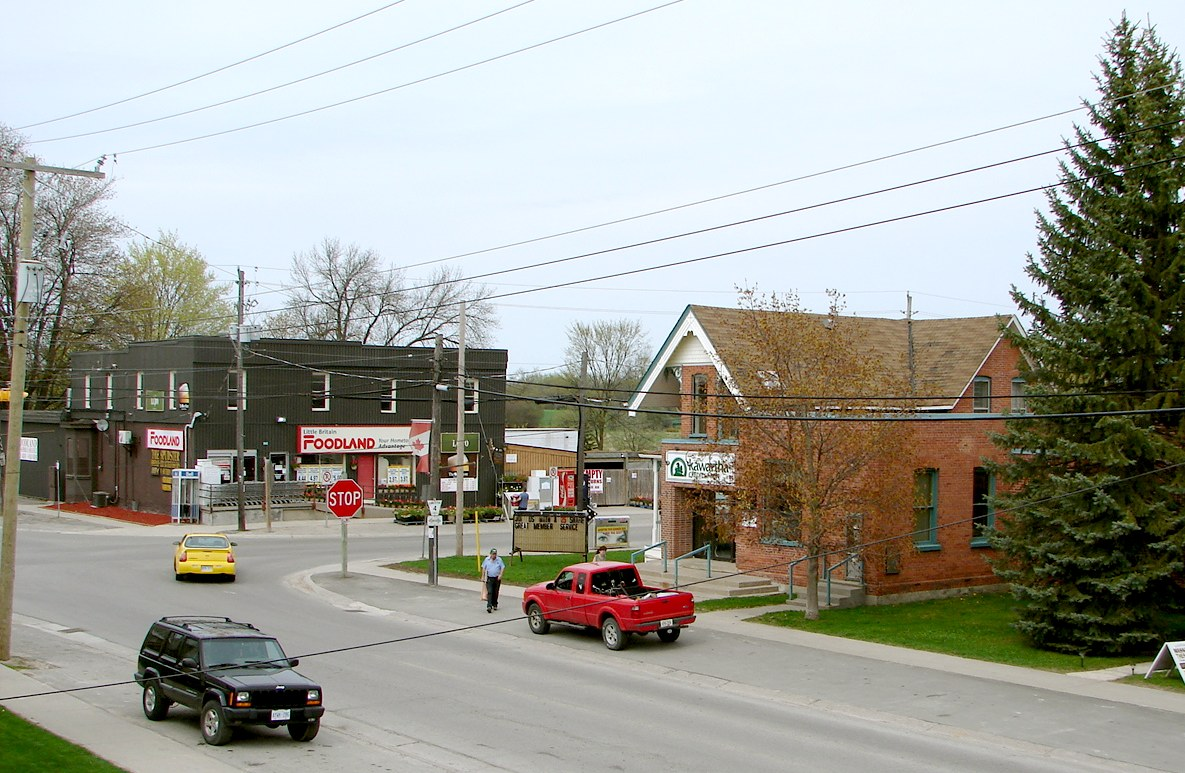
Little Britain

Little Britain is on lots 15 and 16, concessions 4 and 5, four miles straight south of Oakwood on the old grain route to Port Hoover. It is built almost at the intersection of Mariposa Brook and a small tributary which flows through the village from the west. It was founded by Harrison Haight, who settled here in 1834 and three years later built the first mill in Mariposa. This mill, which was not demolished until 1910, required the efforts of nearly the whole country side for its erection, for its beams and posts were of ponderous white oak. (Two living examples of these gigantic original trees still living can be seen today on Salem Road around lot 13).

In the mid 19th century there was no bridge over the creek and no road between Little Britain and Oakwood. Robert F. Whiteside was the village's chief merchant and leading citizen during the pioneer period. In 1850 the Christians opened a church and in 1852 the Bible Christians followed suit. A Post Office was not opened until 1853. The year 1888 saw Little Britain the largest business centre in the township.

The chief industries were: Joseph Maunder's carriage and blacksmithing works; Wm. Burden's carriage and blacksmithing works; Maunder's sash, door and planing factory and shingle mill; Edwin Mark's foundry and implement works; Isaac Finley's steam roller flour mill, and Davidson's flour mill. W. H. Pogue, S. H. Metherell, J. Weldon, and T. H. Morton ran general stores. T. H. Morton also had the Post Office. H. C. Wills owned a grocery store and also ran the stage to Mariposa Station. A. M. Rusland had a tinware store, R. Smith a furniture store, S. Champion a tailor shop, and both Wm. Rodd and John Eck harness shops. Joseph Jenkins ran the village hotel. The chief sanctuaries were the large Methodist church on Mill Street West, presided over by the Rev. William Briden and his assistant, the Rev. S. H. Anderson, and the Christian church, tended by the Rev. J. C. Pilkie. Prominent among the pioneer names in and about Little Britain are those of Broad, Cory, Davidson, Dix, Eakins, Glass, Glennie, Greenaway, Hall, Henderson, Johnston, King, Marks, Metherell, Netherton, Parkinson, Prouse, Rays, Rodman, Siemmon, Stewart, Wallis, Webster, Whiteside, and Wickett.

None of these three villages, Manilla, Oakwood, and Little Britain, have attained dimensions sufficient to command incorporation. The reason, as already suggested, lies in the absence of power for industry and in the fact that no railway station has been placed within a mile of their borders.

Whether this represents the balanced result of village plotting and counter plotting in the days of railway construction, or whether the railway builders were inadequately bonused, or whether the present route of the Whitby-Lindsay division was the necessary choice of civil engineers, is somewhat uncertain. In any case, the railway has contributed nothing to the growth of these centres.

=== Mariposa ===
The township centre was located by the Victoria/Kawartha Lakes Road 6 (Eldon Road) and the former Grand Trunk Railway. The CBD was home to the centrally located Mariposa Station between Oakwood and Little Britain. It was formerly part of Victoria County, it is currently part of the one-tier City of Kawartha Lakes. Until the creation of Kawartha Lakes and the consequent disbandment of Victoria County and its constituent municipalities, Mariposa Township was also a political as well as a geographical township.

== In popular culture ==
Stephen Leacock, McGill University political economy professor and humorist, spent about a decade of his childhood in Egypt in Georgina Township about 20 kilometres away from Mariposa. After being hired at McGill, he also bought a summer home across Lake Simcoe in Orillia which was near Mariposa Beach.

When Leacock wrote Sunshine Sketches of a Little Town, the subject matter was provided by Orillia and thinly disguised. He named his fictional town Mariposa, inspired by some or all of the real Mariposas he had been acquainted with. The Mariposa Folk Festival is named after the fictional town and not any of the real places. Thus, the fictional meaning has almost completely supplanted the original meaning of what had been real places.

== Notable people ==
- W. G. Hardy (1895 – 1979), Born in Peniel, near Oakwood. Canadian professor, writer, and ice hockey administrator, Member of the Order of Canada.
- C.B. Mark (1872 – 1942), M.P.P. Sask (Lib) 1912–1917. Born in Little Britain, pharmacist.

== See also ==
- List of townships in Ontario
