= Dana Skoropad =

Canadian politician

The Honourable Dana Skoropad ECS

Member of the Saskatchewan Legislative Assembly for Arm River
- In office October 26, 2020 – October 1, 2024
- Preceded by: Greg Brkich
- Succeeded by: Barret Kropf

Personal details
- Party: Saskatchewan Party
- Occupation: Teacher; Insurance agent
- Website: https://www.danaskoropad.ca

Dana Skoropad is a Canadian politician who was elected to the Saskatchewan Legislative Assembly in the 2020 general election. He represented Arm River as a member of the Saskatchewan Party for one term and did not stand for re-election. On May 31, 2022, Skoropad was appointed to cabinet as Minister of Environment. In August 2023, Skoropad announced that he would not be running in the next election, and he was shuffled out of cabinet on August 29.

Skoropad grew up on a family farm south of Chamberlain. He obtained an education degree from the University of Saskatchewan. He further completed a business program in Lethbridge, Alberta in the late 1990s.

Saskatchewan provincial government of Scott Moe
Cabinet post (1)
Predecessor	Office	Successor
Warren Kaeding	Minister of Environment; May 31, 2022–August 29, 2023	Christine Tell
