= Harvey McLane =

Canadian politician

Harvey McLane (born June 10, 1949) was a Canadian provincial politician. He was the Liberal member of the Legislative Assembly of Saskatchewan for the constituency of Arm River, from 1995 until 1999. As representative of the Arm River riding, he was preceded by Progressive Conservative Gerald Muirhead and followed by Saskatchewan Party member Greg Brkich.
