= Thomas Frederick Waugh =

Canadian politician

Dr. Thomas Frederick Waugh (1871–1956) was a Canadian provincial politician. He was born in Warwick, Ontario. He attended school at Watford, Ontario, followed by Detroit Medical School, graduating in 1898. After graduation, he moved to Park River, North Dakota. In 1907 he briefly moved to Saskatoon, Saskatchewan, working as a doctor as part of a partnership, before moving back to Park River. In 1911 he moved to Imperial, Saskatchewan, practicing as the village doctor. He also served as the first Overseer of the village when it was incorporated in 1911.

He was elected as the Liberal member of the Legislative Assembly of Saskatchewan for the constituency of Arm River, from 1928 until 1929. He was elected in a by-election, replacing long-time Liberal MLA and former Speaker of the Legislative Assembly George Adam Scott, but only served for seven months before the legislature was dissolved. In the next general election he lost out to the Conservative candidate, Duncan Selby Hutcheon.

In the 1930s he moved to Mankota, Saskatchewan where he practiced as municipal doctor for a few years. He then retired, moving first to Victoria, BC, then to New York City. He was married to Mary Wadge, and had two daughters: Vera (Hartley), a dietician for the Misacordia Hospital in New York; and Helen (Binkley), a registered nurse.

Preceded by George Adam Scott	MLA Arm River; 1928-1929	Succeeded by Duncan Selby Hutcheon
