= John Taylor Douglas =

Canadian politician and farmer

John Taylor Douglas (October 28, 1892 – February 19, 1976) was a farmer and political figure in Saskatchewan. He represented Rosetown from 1944 to 1960 in the Legislative Assembly of Saskatchewan as a Co-operative Commonwealth Federation (CCF) member.

He was born in Cumberland, Ontario, the son of John Douglas and Anne Welch, was educated there and came west with his family in 1906, settling in the Laura district of Saskatchewan. Douglas studied agriculture at the University of Saskatchewan and went on to farm near Laura.

He was campaign manager for Major James Coldwell in 1935, when Coldwell was elected to the Canadian House of Commons for the CCF. He married Eva Hopkins in 1940. In 1941, Douglas became provincial organizer for the CCF.

He unsuccessfully challenged Liberal MLA Neil McVicar in Rosetown at the 1938 general election, but was elected in 1944

He served in the provincial cabinet as Minister of Highways and Transportation and as Minister of Public Works. Douglas retired from politics in 1960.
