= Franklin Robert Shortreed =

Canadian politician

Member of the Legislative Assembly of Saskatchewan for Happyland
- In office June 26, 1922 – 1925
- Preceded by: Stephen Morrey
- Succeeded by: John Joseph Keelan

Personal details
- Born: September 18, 1875; Salem, Ontario, Canada
- Died: February 11, 1954 (aged 78)
- Political party: Liberal
- Children: 4

Franklin Robert Shortreed (September 18, 1875 – February 11, 1954) was a Canadian political figure in Saskatchewan. He represented Happyland in the Legislative Assembly of Saskatchewan from 1922 to 1925 as a Liberal.

== Early life ==
Shortreed was born in Salem, Ontario, and educated in Morden, Manitoba.

== Career ==
In 1903, Shortreed moved from Manitoba to Tantallon, Saskatchewan, where he served as postmaster and operated a lumber and implement business. He moved with his family to the Maple Creek area, where he settled on a farm, in 1909. Shortreed later served as reeve for the local municipality. He was first elected to the provincial assembly in a 1922 by-election held following the death of Stephen Morrey.
