= Donald Leonard Faris =

Canadian politician

Donald Leonard Faris (born 18 November 1936) is a Canadian United Church minister and former provincial politician. He was born in Vancouver, British Columbia, Canada and grew up and was educated there. Faris received his BA degree from the University of BC and his BD degree from Union College of BC (now part of the Vancouver School of Theology). In 1967 he received his PhD in Christian Doctrine from New College, University of Edinburgh, Scotland. He was the New Democrat member of the Legislative Assembly of Saskatchewan for the constituency of Arm River from 1971 until 1978. As representative of the Arm River riding, he was preceded by Liberal Wilbert McIvor and followed by Progressive Conservative Gerald Muirhead.

Faris was Minister of Continuing Education from 1976 to 1978, and Minister of Education from 1977 to 1978. He was defeated by Gerald Muirhead when he ran for reelection to the assembly in 1978.
