= Hanley (Saskatchewan electoral district) =

Former provincial electoral district in Saskatchewan, Canada

Coordinates: 51°40′N 106°37′W

Hanley is a former provincial electoral division for the Legislative Assembly of the province of Saskatchewan, Canada, centred on the town of Hanley. This district was created before the 2nd Saskatchewan general election in 1908. The riding was dissolved and combined with the Arm River, Rosthern, Kinistino, Saskatoon Buena Vista, Saskatoon Eastview, Saskatoon Sutherland and Biggar districts before the 18th Saskatchewan general election in 1975.

It is now part of the constituencies of Arm River-Watrous, Rosetown-Elrose, and Saskatoon Southeast.

== Members of the Legislative Assembly ==
#	MLA	Served	Party
1.	James Walter MacNeill	1908–1913	Liberal
2.	Macbeth Malcolm	June 28, 1913 – 1921	Liberal
3.	Ernest Redford Ketcheson	1921–1925	Liberal
4.	Reginald Stipe	1925–1934	Progressive
5.	Charles Agar	1934–1944	Liberal
6.	Jim Aitken	1944–1948	CCF
7.	Robert Walker	1948–1967	CCF-NDP
8.	Robert Heggie	1967–1971	Liberal
9.	Paul Mostoway	1971–1975	New Democrat

== Election results ==
1908 Saskatchewan general election: Hanley electoral district
Party	Candidate	Votes	%	±%
Liberal	James Walter MacNeill	704	51.69%	–
Provincial Rights	Peder Myhre Henricks	658	48.31%	–
Total		1,362	100.00%	

1912 Saskatchewan general election: Hanley electoral district
Party	Candidate	Votes	%	±%
Liberal	James Walter MacNeill	1,138	61.65%	+9.96
Conservative	John R. Hamilton	708	38.35%	-9.96
Total		1,846	100.00%	

June 28, 1913 By-Election: Hanley electoral district
Party	Candidate	Votes	%	±%
Liberal	Macbeth Malcolm	1,084	61.14%	-0.51
Conservative	Tobias Nelson Bjorndahl	689	38.86%	+0.51
Total		1,773	100.00%	

1917 Saskatchewan general election: Hanley electoral district
Party	Candidate	Votes	%	±%
Liberal	Macbeth Malcolm	Acclaimed	100.00%	
Total		Acclamation		

1921 Saskatchewan general election: Hanley electoral district
Party	Candidate	Votes	%	±%
Liberal	Ernest Redford Ketcheson	1,953	68.57%	-
Independent	Paul G. Henricks	895	31.43%	–
Total		2,848	100.00%	

1925 Saskatchewan general election: Hanley electoral district
Party	Candidate	Votes	%	±%
Progressive	Reginald Stipe	1,764	52.70%	–
Liberal	Ernest Redford Ketcheson	1,583	47.30%	-21.27
Total		3,347	100.00%	

1929 Saskatchewan general election: Hanley electoral district
Party	Candidate	Votes	%	±%
Progressive	Reginald Stipe	2,909	60.53%	+7.83
Liberal	James Alexander Sandilands	1,897	39.47%	-7.83
Total		4,806	100.00%	

1934 Saskatchewan general election: Hanley electoral district
Party	Candidate	Votes	%	±%
Liberal	Charles Agar	2,843	47.77%	+8.30
Conservative	John Thomas McOrmond	1,703	28.62%	-
Farmer-Labour	Arthur John Fahl	1,405	23.61%	–
Total		5,951	100.00%	

1938 Saskatchewan general election: Hanley electoral district
Party	Candidate	Votes	%	±%
Liberal	Charles Agar	2,774	46.26%	-1.51
Conservative	John A. Stewart	1,623	27.07%	-1.55
Social Credit	Frederick E. Roluf	1,599	26.67%	–
Total		5,996	100.00%	

1944 Saskatchewan general election: Hanley electoral district
Party	Candidate	Votes	%	±%
CCF	Jim Aitken	2,272	45.99%	-
Liberal	Charles Agar	1,775	35.93%	-10.33
Prog. Conservative	James H. Cannon	893	18.08%	-8.99
Total		4,940	100.00%	

1948 Saskatchewan general election: Hanley electoral district
Party	Candidate	Votes	%	±%
CCF	Robert Walker	2,417	38.24%	-7.75
Liberal	Clayton L. Pascoe	2,366	37.44%	+1.51
Prog. Conservative	Emmett M. Hall	1,025	16.22%	-1.86
Social Credit	Frederick E. Roluf	512	8.10%	-
Total		6,320	100.00%	

1952 Saskatchewan general election: Hanley electoral district
Party	Candidate	Votes	%	±%
CCF	Robert Walker	2,977	50.78%	+12.54
Liberal	Winston E. Stewart	2,431	41.46%	+4.02
Prog. Conservative	Martin P. Pederson	455	7.76%	-8.46
Total		5,863	100.00%	

1956 Saskatchewan general election: Hanley electoral district
Party	Candidate	Votes	%	±%
CCF	Robert Walker	2,957	45.63%	-5.15
Liberal	Clayton L. Pascoe	1,680	25.93%	-15.53
Social Credit	Clarence Eberts	1,587	24.49%	-
Prog. Conservative	Alfred V. "Al" Svoboda	256	3.95%	-3.81
Total		6,480	100.00%	

1960 Saskatchewan general election: Hanley electoral district
Party	Candidate	Votes	%	±%
CCF	Robert Walker	3,348	44.36%	-1.27
Liberal	Isaac Thiessen	2,217	29.37%	+3.44
Prog. Conservative	Roxwell Sekulich	1,059	14.03%	+10.08
Social Credit	Clarence Eberts	924	12.24%	-12.25
Total		7,548	100.00%	

1964 Saskatchewan general election: Hanley electoral district
Party	Candidate	Votes	%	±%
CCF	~~Robert Walker~~	~~3,940~~	~~37.59%~~	~~-6.77~~
Liberal	~~Herbert C. Pinder~~	~~3,938~~	~~37.58%~~	~~+8.21~~
Prog. Conservative	~~Hans Taal~~	~~2,602~~	~~24.83%~~	~~+10.80~~
Total		~~10,480~~	~~100.00%~~	

Re-run of voided election

December 16, 1964 By-Election: Hanley electoral district
Party	Candidate	Votes	%	±%
CCF	Robert Walker	4,608	45.14%	+7.55
Liberal	Herbert C. Pinder	3,864	37.86%	+0.28
Prog. Conservative	W. Hugh Arscott	1,735	17.00%	-7.83
Total		10,207	100.00%	

1967 Saskatchewan general election: Hanley electoral district
Party	Candidate	Votes	%	±%
Liberal	Robert Heggie	2,282	51.50%	+13.64
NDP	Robert Walker	2,149	48.50%	+3.36
Total		4,431	100.00%	

1971 Saskatchewan general election: Hanley electoral district
Party	Candidate	Votes	%	±%
NDP	Paul Mostoway	3,270	55.07%	+6.57
Liberal	Robert Heggie	2,668	44.93%	-6.57
Total		5,938	100.00%	

== See also ==
- List of Saskatchewan provincial electoral districts
- List of Saskatchewan general elections
- Canadian provincial electoral districts
