= Gustaf Herman Danielson =

Canadian politician

Gustaf Herman Danielson (1883 – July 1971) was a Canadian provincial politician. He was born in Sweden, immigrated to the United States in 1901, and then to Saskatchewan in 1904. In Saskatchewan he homesteaded south of Elbow. He was active in many organizations: he was a Saskatchewan Wheat Pool delegate, served on the board of the Davidson Co-operative Association for more than forty years, was elected to Rural Municipality council for fifteen years, the last eight as reeve, the school board for seven years, and the Davidson Hospital Board for thirty-eight years.

He was elected as the Liberal member of the Legislative Assembly of Saskatchewan for the constituency of Arm River, from 1934 until 1964, serving seven terms. In 1938, he defeated Conservative leader and future Prime Minister of Canada John Diefenbaker. In 1944 he was one of only five Liberals to be elected. As representative of the Arm River riding, he was preceded by Conservative Duncan Selby Hutcheon and followed by the first leader of the Progressive Conservative Party of Saskatchewan, Martin Peder Pederson. While his thirty years in the Legislature makes him its longest-serving member, his defeat in 1964 was ironic in that it was the election which saw the Liberals return to power after twenty years in opposition. Danielson Provincial Park (located near Saskatchewan's Lake Diefenbaker and Gardiner Dam) was named after him.

Preceded by Duncan Selby Hutcheon	MLA Arm River; 1934-1964	Succeeded by Martin Peder Pederson
