= Lloydminster (former Saskatchewan electoral district) =

Former provincial electoral district in Saskatchewan, Canada

Coordinates: 53°17′N 109°35′W

Lloydminster is a former provincial electoral district for the Legislative Assembly of the province of Saskatchewan, Canada. This constituency was created before the 2nd Saskatchewan general election in 1908. Abolished in 1934, the riding was incorporated into the district of Cut Knife.

This constituency was reconstituted for the 23rd Saskatchewan general election in 1995.

== Members of the Legislative Assembly ==
#	MLA	Served	Party
1.	Henry Claud Lisle	1908–1912	Liberal
2.	John Percival Lyle	1912–1917	Liberal
3.	Robert James Gordon	1917–1934	Liberal

== Election results ==
1908 Saskatchewan general election: Lloydmnster electoral district
Party	Candidate	Votes	%	±%
Liberal	Henry Claud Lisle	680	51.36%	–
Provincial Rights	Henry Robert Miles	644	48.64%	–
Total		1,324	100.00%	

1912 Saskatchewan general election: Lloydminster electoral district
Party	Candidate	Votes	%	±%
Liberal	John Percival Lyle	606	39.74%	-11.62
Conservative	Oscar H. Price	517	33.90%	-14.74
Independent	Ambrose H. Longton	402	26.36%	–
Total		1,525	100.00%	

1917 Saskatchewan general election: Lloydminster electoral district
Party	Candidate	Votes	%	±%
Liberal	Robert James Gordon	1,257	59.80%	+20.06
Conservative	James A. Hill	845	40.20%	+6.30
Total		2,102	100.00%	

1921 Saskatchewan general election: Lloydminster electoral district
Party	Candidate	Votes	%	±%
Liberal	Robert James Gordon	Acclaimed	100.00%	
Total		Acclamation		

1925 Saskatchewan general election: Lloydminster electoral district
Party	Candidate	Votes	%	±%
Liberal	Robert James Gordon	1,144	66.67%	-
Progressive	Robert M. Armstrong	572	33.33%	–
Total		1,716	100.00%	

1929 Saskatchewan general election: Lloydminster electoral district
Party	Candidate	Votes	%	±%
Liberal	Robert James Gordon	1,510	43.62%	-23.05
Progressive	William Albert Gardiner	1,003	28.97%	-4.36
Conservative	James Hetherington	949	27.41%	-
Total		3,462	100.00%	

== See also ==
- List of Saskatchewan provincial electoral districts
- List of Saskatchewan general elections
- Canadian provincial electoral districts
