= Macbeth Malcolm =

Canadian politician

Macbeth Malcolm (May 16, 1878 – July 19, 1941) was a farmer, businessman and political figure in Saskatchewan. He represented Hanley in the Legislative Assembly of Saskatchewan from 1913 to 1921 as a Liberal.

He was born in Teeterville, Norfolk County, Ontario and moved to Devils Lake, North Dakota, before homesteading in the Hanley and Kenaston districts of Saskatchewan in 1902. Malcolm married Elizabeth MacLennan. He served as the first reeve for the Regional Municipality of Rosedale No. 283 from 1910 to 1912. Malcolm was provincial president of the United Grain Growers. He imported horses from Ontario for sale to local homesteaders and also sold real estate. For several years, Malcolm operated the Cockshutt and J.I. Case Machine company in Hanley. He also helped organize the construction of a new curling rink there. Malcolm served in the Canadian army during World War I and was wounded in the Battle of the Somme in 1916.

He was first elected to the provincial assembly in a 1913 by-election held after James Walter MacNeill resigned from his seat.
