= Greg Brkich =

Canadian provincial politician

The Honourable Greg Brkich ECS

Member of the Saskatchewan Legislative Assembly for Arm River Arm River-Watrous (2003-2016)
- In office August 16, 1999 – September 29, 2020
- Preceded by: Harvey McLane
- Succeeded by: Dana Skoropad

Leader of the Government in the Legislative Assembly of Saskatchewan
- In office August 30, 2017 – August 13, 2019
- Premier: Brad Wall; Scott Moe
- Preceded by: Paul Merriman
- Succeeded by: Jeremy Harrison

Personal details
- Born: December 5, 1958 (age 67) Bladworth, Saskatchewan
- Party: Saskatchewan Party (former), Saskatchewan United Party (starting 2024)

Greg Brkich (/ˈbɜːrkiːtʃ/ BUR-keetch; born December 5, 1958) is a Canadian provincial politician, currently a member of the Saskatchewan United Party. He served as a Saskatchewan Party member of the Legislative Assembly of Saskatchewan for the constituency of Arm River (known as Arm River-Watrous from 2003 to 2016). He was first elected as a Member of the Legislative Assembly in 1999 and was re-elected in 2003, 2007, 2011, and 2016. He did not seek re-election in 2020.

While in government, Brkich served as Deputy Speaker and Chair of the Committee of the Whole from 2007 to 2011, and as Government House Leader from 2017 to 2019. He also served as Legislative Secretary to the Minister of Agriculture, Agriculture Programs Innovation Initiative, Vice-Chair of the caucus’ Standing Policy Committee on Intergovernmental Affairs and Justice and is a member of both the Legislature's Standing Committee on Intergovernmental Affairs and Justice and the Private Bills committee.

== Saskatchewan United Party ==
In September 2024, it was announced that Brkich would be a candidate in the 2024 Saskatchewan election under the Saskatchewan United Party banner in the Saskatoon Southeast constituency.
