= William Charles Sutherland =

Canadian politician (1865–1940)

Speaker of the Legislative Assembly of Saskatchewan
- In office December 10, 1908 – June 15, 1912
- Preceded by: Thomas MacNutt
- Succeeded by: John Albert Sheppard

Personal details
- Born: June 7, 1865
- Died: March 2, 1940 (aged 74)
- Party: Liberal
- Profession: Rancher, Farmer, Lawyer
- Cabinet: Speaker of the Legislative Assembly of Saskatchewan
- Portfolio: Member of the Legislative Assembly

William Charles Sutherland (June 7, 1865 – March 2, 1940) was the second Speaker of the Legislative Assembly of Saskatchewan (1908–1912), i.e., the presiding officer of the legislature. Sutherland was a Liberal Member of the Legislative Assembly who was first elected in the first general election on December 13, 1905, to the first legislature of the newly formed Province of Saskatchewan.

Sutherland represented the electoral district of Saskatoon, and served with Premier Walter Scott. He was re-elected in the 1908 and 1912 elections to represent Saskatoon County. On May 23, 1906, Sutherland introduced a resolution to move the capital of the province from Regina to Saskatoon, but the motion was defeated by a vote of 21–2 in the legislature. He died on March 2, 1940.

== Saskatoon Club ==
Sutherland, Fred Engen, F. S. Cahill, H.L. Jordan and James Straton were the first members of the executive committee for the Saskatoon Club. The Saskatoon Club was established as a club for social purposes to serve business, professional and community leaders as a supplement the role of the Board of Trade in Saskatoon and Saskatchewan.

== A Legacy Honored, A Life Remembered ==
- On the 30th day of August 1909 Sutherland, Saskatchewan was officiated a village incorporated under the namesake of William Charles Sutherland. This, in honor of the Sutherland's pioneering political role of service as community councilman in 1906, during the early phases of the neighbourhood formation.
- He was an area rancher who later farmed, and practised law in the Saskatoon area. Jno Henry, Charles Willoughby, Wm Richardson, Wm Chas Sutherland, Frederick Engen, and Albert Herman Hanson owned the land at Section 29 Township 36 Ramge 5 West of the Third Meridian.
- According to the City of Saskatoon archives, William Charles Sutherland "helped to secure the University of Saskatchewan for Saskatoon."
