= Neil McVicar (politician) =

Canadian politician

Neil McVicar MLA

Member of the Saskatchewan Legislative Assembly for Rosetown
- In office 1944–1934
- Preceded by: Nathaniel Given
- Succeeded by: John Taylor Douglas

Personal details
- Party: Liberal Party

Neil McVicar was a Canadian politician from the province of Saskatchewan. He represented Rosetown as a Liberal on the Legislative Assembly from 1934 to 1944.

== See also ==
- 8th Saskatchewan Legislature
- 9th Saskatchewan Legislature
