= John Edward Gryde =

Canadian politician

John Edward Gryde (April 17, 1882 – 1952) was an American-born general merchant and political figure in Saskatchewan. He represented Cypress from 1929 to 1934 in the Legislative Assembly of Saskatchewan as a Conservative.

He was born in Grafton, Walsh County, North Dakota, the son of Kittel K. Gryde and Ireborg Torgeson, both natives of Norway. In 1912, Gryde married Genna Dorine Nyhus. Gryde was postmaster for Waldville, Saskatchewan and served on the town council for Climax, also serving as mayor. He had moved his house from Waldville to Climax in 1923. Gryde was defeated by Clarence Stork when he ran for reelection to the provincial assembly in 1934. He died in a car crash in 1952.
