= Barret Kropf =

Canadian politician

Barrett Kropf MLA

Member of the Saskatchewan Legislative Assembly for Dakota-Arm River
- Incumbent
- Assumed office October 28, 2024
- Preceded by: Dana Skoropad

Personal details
- Party: Saskatchewan Party

Barret Kropf is a Canadian politician who was elected to the Legislative Assembly of Saskatchewan in the 2024 general election, representing Dakota-Arm River as a member of the Saskatchewan Party. He currently serves as the legislative secretary for education.

Kropf was born and raised in Estevan before studying at Trinity Western University and graduating with a Bachelor of Arts in Leadership. He then worked in the sports industry for over 30 years, managing and coaching teams as diverse as hockey, cycling, and football on the domestic and international stage. He worked with Hockey Ministries International from 1998-2003 as a hockey chaplaincy coordinator for Western Canada. After coaching the Briercrest Clippers from 2003-2006, he was the chaplain for the Saskatchewan Roughriders. He coached the Trinity Western University Spartans hockey team from 2013-2021. He won the BCIHL Coach of Year in the 2013-14, 2014-15, and 2017-18 season.

He currently lives in Caronport with his wife, Bridget. Together, they have three sons.
