= Dakota-Arm River =

Provincial electoral district in Saskatchewan, Canada

Coordinates: 51°10′N 105°45′W

Saskatchewan electoral district

Provincial electoral district
- Legislature: Legislative Assembly of Saskatchewan
MLA
Barret Kropf
Saskatchewan
- First contested: 1908
- Last contested: 2024

Dakota-Arm River is a provincial electoral district for the Legislative Assembly of Saskatchewan, Canada. This constituency is located in south central Saskatchewan. The district was created as Arm River for the 1908 Saskatchewan general election, and it was last contested in the 2020 election. Grain farming and cattle ranching are the major economic activities of the area. The two largest towns in the constituency are Davidson and Outlook. Much of the Highway 11 corridor connecting Regina and Saskatoon lies within the constituency.

== History ==
Arm River was originally created before the 2nd Saskatchewan general election in 1908 and has existed ever since. It was named for the Arm River which flows roughly through the middle of the district.

The riding's boundaries have changed many times over the years due to redistribution. Between 2003 and 2016, the district was called Arm River-Watrous as the riding had included much of the former Watrous constituency. The riding's name was changed back to Arm River for the 2016 general election.

For the 2024 general election, the riding was renamed Dakota-Arm River due to significant boundary shifts. The district lost significant territory to Lumsden-Morse, Humboldt-Watrous, Kelvington-Wadena and Last Mountain-Touchwood, while gaining a much smaller (but more densely populated) area from Saskatoon Stonebridge-Dakota.

== Members of the Legislative Assembly ==
| Legislature | Years | Member | Party |
|---|---|---|---|
Arm River
| 2nd | 1908–1912 | George Adam Scott | Liberal |
| 3rd | 1912–1917 | George Adam Scott | Liberal |
| 4th | 1917–1921 | George Adam Scott | Liberal |
| 5th | 1921–1925 | George Adam Scott | Liberal |
| 6th | 1925–1928 | George Adam Scott | Liberal |
| 6th | 1928–1929 | Thomas Frederick Waugh | Liberal |
| 7th | 1929–1934 | Duncan Selby Hutcheon | Progressive Conservative |
| 8th | 1934–1938 | Gustaf Herman Danielson | Liberal |
| 9th | 1938–1944 | Gustaf Herman Danielson | Liberal |
| 10th | 1944–1948 | Gustaf Herman Danielson | Liberal |
| 11th | 1948–1952 | Gustaf Herman Danielson | Liberal |
| 12th | 1952–1956 | Gustaf Herman Danielson | Liberal |
| 13th | 1956–1960 | Gustaf Herman Danielson | Liberal |
| 14th | 1960–1964 | Gustaf Herman Danielson | Liberal |
| 15th | 1964–1967 | Martin Peder Pederson | Progressive Conservative |
| 16th | 1967–1971 | Wilbert McIvor | Liberal |
| 17th | 1971–1975 | Donald Leonard Faris | New Democratic Party |
| 18th | 1975–1978 | Donald Leonard Faris | New Democratic Party |
| 19th | 1978–1982 | Gerald Muirhead | Progressive Conservative |
| 20th | 1982–1986 | Gerald Muirhead | Progressive Conservative |
| 21st | 1986–1991 | Gerald Muirhead | Progressive Conservative |
| 22nd | 1991–1995 | Gerald Muirhead | Progressive Conservative |
| 23rd | 1995–1999 | Harvey McLane | Liberal |
| 24th | 1999–2003 | Greg Brkich | Saskatchewan Party |
Arm River-Watrous
| 25th | 2003–2007 | Greg Brkich | Saskatchewan Party |
| 26th | 2007–2011 | Greg Brkich | Saskatchewan Party |
| 27th | 2011–2016 | Greg Brkich | Saskatchewan Party |
Arm River
| 28th | 2016–2020 | Greg Brkich | Saskatchewan Party |
| 29th | 2020–2024 | Dana Skoropad | Saskatchewan Party |
Dakota-Arm River
| 30th | 2024–present | Barret Kropf | Saskatchewan Party |

== Election results ==
=== Dakota-Arm River (2024–present) ===
2024 Saskatchewan general election
| Party | Candidate | Votes | % | ±% |
|---|---|---|---|---|
| Saskatchewan | Barret Kropf | 5,027 | 57.45 | -19.35 |
| New Democratic | Jordan Wiens | 2,114 | 24.16 | +7.46 |
| Saskatchewan United | Darren Ebenal | 1,074 | 12.27 | – |
| Progressive Conservative | Raymond L. Carrick | 443 | 5.06 | +0.01 |
| Green | Joseph Reynolds | 92 | 1.05 | -1.25 |
| Total valid votes | | 8,750 | 99.43 | |
| Total rejected ballots | | 50 | 0.57 | |
| Turnout | | 8,800 | 65.18 | |
| Eligible voters | | 13,502 | | |
| Saskatchewan hold | | Swing | | |
Source: Elections Saskatchewan

2020 provincial election redistributed results
| Party | % |
|---|---|
| Saskatchewan | 76.8 |
| New Democratic | 16.7 |
| Green | 2.3 |
| Buffalo | 1.3 |

=== Arm River (2016-2024) ===
2020 Saskatchewan general election: Arm River
| Party | Candidate | Votes | % | ±% |
|---|---|---|---|---|
| Saskatchewan | Dana Skoropad | 6,569 | 76.98 | +3.59 |
| New Democratic | Cam Goff | 1,336 | 15.66 | -1.62 |
| Progressive Conservative | Steve Forbes | 431 | 5.05 | +1.04 |
| Green | Tiffany Giesbrecht | 197 | 2.31 | -0.55 |
| Total valid votes | | 8,533 | 99.59 | |
| Total rejected ballots | | 35 | 0.41 | |
| Turnout | | 8,568 | – | |
| Eligible voters | | – | | |
| Saskatchewan hold | | Swing | | – |
Source: Elections Saskatchewan

2016 Saskatchewan general election: Arm River
| Party | Candidate | Votes | % | ±% |
|---|---|---|---|---|
| Saskatchewan | Greg Brkich | 6,187 | 73.39 | -0.36 |
| New Democratic | Denise Leduc | 1,457 | 17.28 | -6.59 |
| Progressive Conservative | Raymond Carrick | 338 | 4.01 | - |
| Green | Dale Dewar | 241 | 2.86 | +0.40 |
| Liberal | Russ Collicott | 207 | 2.46 | - |
| Total valid votes | | 8,430 | 99.86 | |
| Total rejected ballots | | 12 | 0.14 | |
| Turnout | | 8,442 | 67.33 | |
| Eligible voters | | 12,539 | | |
| Saskatchewan hold | | Swing | | – |
Source: Elections Saskatchewan

=== Arm River-Watrous (2003-2016) ===
2011 Saskatchewan general election
| Party | Candidate | Votes | % | ±% |
|---|---|---|---|---|
| Saskatchewan | Greg P. Brkich | 5,061 | 73.67 | +15.75 |
| New Democratic | Eric Skonberg | 1,640 | 23.87 | -4.75 |
| Green | Orest Shasko | 169 | 2.46 | +0.46 |
| Total | | 6,870 | 100 | |

2007 Saskatchewan general election
| Party | Candidate | Votes | % | ±% |
|---|---|---|---|---|
| Saskatchewan | Greg P. Brkich | 4,683 | 57.92 | +9.91 |
| New Democratic | Gordon MacMurchy | 2,314 | 28.62 | -9.61 |
| Liberal | Lou Coderre | 762 | 9.43 | -1.61 |
| Progressive Conservative | Gordon Pederson | 164 | 2.03 | +0.09 |
| Green | Arnold Taylor | 162 | 2.00 | – |
| Total | | 8,085 | 100 | |

2003 Saskatchewan general election
| Party | Candidate | Votes | % | ±% |
|---|---|---|---|---|
| Saskatchewan | Greg P. Brkich | 4,009 | 48.01 | – |
| New Democratic | Carol Rowan | 3,193 | 38.23 | – |
| Liberal | Steven Barlow | 922 | 11.04 | – |
| Western Independence | Gord Anderson | 162 | 1.94 | – |
| Independent | Gord Pederson | 65 | 0.78 | – |
| Total | | 8,351 | 100 | |

=== Arm River (1905-2003) ===
1999 Saskatchewan general election: Arm River
| Party | Candidate | Votes | % | ±% |
|---|---|---|---|---|
| Saskatchewan | Greg P. Brkich | 3,696 | 43.84 | - |
| Liberal | Harvey McLane | 2,624 | 31.13 | −17.68 |
| New Democratic | Ron Bishoff | 2,110 | 25.03 | −11.04 |
| Total | | 8,430 | 100 | |

1995 Saskatchewan general election: Arm River
| Party | Candidate | Votes | % | ±% |
|---|---|---|---|---|
| Liberal | Harvey McLane | 4,093 | 48.81 | +19.70 |
| New Democratic | Bob Robertson | 3,025 | 36.07 | +3.96 |
| Progressive Conservative | Everett Ritson | 1,268 | 15.12 | -23.08 |
| Total | | 8,386 | 100 | |

1991 Saskatchewan general election: Arm River
| Party | Candidate | Votes | % | ±% |
|---|---|---|---|---|
| Progressive Conservative | Gerald Muirhead | 3,019 | 38.20 | -19.46 |
| New Democratic | Bob Robertson | 2,538 | 32.11 | -3.11 |
| Liberal | David Ashdown | 2,301 | 29.11 | +22.72 |
| Independent | Hilton J. Spencer | 46 | 0.58 | -0.15 |
| Total | | 7,904 | 100 | |

1986 Saskatchewan general election: Arm River
| Party | Candidate | Votes | % | ±% |
|---|---|---|---|---|
| Progressive Conservative | Gerald Muirhead | 4,826 | 57.66 | -5.68 |
| New Democratic | Bob Robertson | 2,948 | 35.22 | +4.51 |
| Liberal | Kim Gleim | 535 | 6.39 | +4.27 |
| Western Canada Concept | Hilton J. Spencer | 61 | 0.73 | -3.10 |
| Total | | 8,370 | 100 | |

1982 Saskatchewan general election: Arm River
| Party | Candidate | Votes | % | ±% |
|---|---|---|---|---|
| Progressive Conservative | Gerald Muirhead | 5,608 | 63.34 | +19.08 |
| New Democratic | Donald Leonard Faris | 2,719 | 30.71 | -11.11 |
| Western Canada Concept | Jim Cross | 339 | 3.83 | - |
| Liberal | Marjorie Towstego | 188 | 2.12 | -11.80 |
| Total | | 8,854 | 100 | |

1978 Saskatchewan general election: Arm River
| Party | Candidate | Votes | % | ±% |
|---|---|---|---|---|
| Progressive Conservative | Gerald Muirhead | 3,501 | 44.26 | +18.53 |
| New Democratic | Donald Leonard Faris | 3,308 | 41.82 | +4.62 |
| Liberal | Greg Wensel | 1,101 | 13.92 | -23.14 |
| Total | | 7,910 | 100 | |

1975 Saskatchewan general election: Arm River
| Party | Candidate | Votes | % | ±% |
|---|---|---|---|---|
| New Democratic | Donald Leonard Faris | 2,854 | 37.21 | -9.13 |
| Liberal | Ron Thorstad | 2,834 | 37.06 | -6.32 |
| Progressive Conservative | Ron McLelland | 1,974 | 25.73 | +15.45 |
| Total | | 7,671 | 100 | |

1971 Saskatchewan general election: Arm River
| Party | Candidate | Votes | % | ±% |
|---|---|---|---|---|
| New Democratic | Donald Leonard Faris | 2,343 | 46.33 | +22.23 |
| Liberal | Wilbert McIvor | 2,193 | 43.38 | +5.09 |
| Progressive Conservative | Orin N. Sather | 520 | 10.29 | -27.33 |
| Total | | 5,055 | 100 | |

1967 Saskatchewan general election: Arm River
| Party | Candidate | Votes | % | ±% |
|---|---|---|---|---|
| Liberal | Wilbert McIvor | 1,929 | 38.29 | +4.03 |
| Progressive Conservative | Martin Peder Pederson | 1,895 | 37.61 | -1.84 |
| New Democratic | Merle Snustead | 1,214 | 24.10 | -2.19 |
| Total | | 5,038 | 100 | |

1964 Saskatchewan general election: Arm River
| Party | Candidate | Votes | % | ±% |
|---|---|---|---|---|
| Progressive Conservative | Martin Peder Pederson | 2,326 | 39.45 | +13.89 |
| Liberal | Gustaf Herman Danielson | 2,020 | 34.26 | +0.78 |
| Co-operative Commonwealth | Emanuel Lang | 1550 | 26.29 | -3.16 |
| Total | | 5,896 | 100 | |

1960 Saskatchewan general election: Arm River
| Party | Candidate | Votes | % | ±% |
|---|---|---|---|---|
| Liberal | Gustaf Herman Danielson | 1,989 | 33.48 | -7.36 |
| Co-operative Commonwealth | Eugene E. Lockwood | 1,749 | 29.44 | -7.64 |
| Progressive Conservative | Martin Peder Pederson | 1,518 | 25.56 | - |
| Social Credit | Louis Rands | 684 | 11.52 | -10.56 |
| Total | | 5,940 | 100 | |

1956 Saskatchewan general election: Arm River
| Party | Candidate | Votes | % | ±% |
|---|---|---|---|---|
| Liberal | Gustaf Herman Danielson | 2,417 | 40.85 | -7.37 |
| Co-operative Commonwealth | Eugene E. Lockwood | 2,194 | 37.08 | -10.11 |
| Social Credit | Malcolm J. Haver | 1,306 | 22.07 | - |
| Total | | 5,917 | 100 | |

1952 Saskatchewan general election: Arm River
| Party | Candidate | Votes | % | ±% |
|---|---|---|---|---|
| Liberal | Gustaf Herman Danielson | 2,670 | 48.22 | -5.31 |
| Co-operative Commonwealth | Eugene E. Lockwood | 2,613 | 47.19 | +11.57 |
| Independent | John W. Dixon | 254 | 4.59 | - |
| Total | | 5,537 | 100 | |

1948 Saskatchewan general election: Arm River
| Party | Candidate | Votes | % | ±% |
|---|---|---|---|---|
| Liberal | Gustaf Herman Danielson | 3,400 | 53.53 | +12.18 |
| Co-operative Commonwealth | E. L. Heinrich | 2,263 | 35.63 | -4.18 |
| Social Credit | Gabriel J. Giesinger | 689 | 10.85 | - |
| Total | | 6,352 | 100 | |

1944 Saskatchewan general election: Arm River
| Party | Candidate | Votes | % | ±% |
|---|---|---|---|---|
| Liberal | Gustaf Herman Danielson | 2,343 | 41.34 | -10.14 |
| Co-operative Commonwealth | William R. Fansher | 2,256 | 39.81 | - |
| Progressive Conservative | Thomas Alfred Homersham | 1,068 | 18.85 | -29.67 |
| Total | | 5,667 | 100 | |

1938 Saskatchewan general election: Arm River
| Party | Candidate | Votes | % | ±% |
|---|---|---|---|---|
| Liberal | Gustaf Herman Danielson | 3,295 | 51.48 | +7.65 |
| Conservative (historical) | John Diefenbaker | 3,105 | 48.52 | +10.34 |
| Total | | 6,400 | 100 | |

1934 Saskatchewan general election: Arm River
| Party | Candidate | Votes | % | ±% |
|---|---|---|---|---|
| Liberal | Gustaf Herman Danielson | 2,222 | 43.84 | -0.32 |
| Conservative (historical) | Duncan Selby Hutcheon | 1,935 | 38.17 | -17.67 |
| Farmer–Labour | David James Christie | 912 | 17.99 | - |
| Total | | 5,069 | 100 | |

1929 Saskatchewan general election: Arm River
| Party | Candidate | Votes | % | ±% |
|---|---|---|---|---|
| Conservative (historical) | Duncan Selby Hutcheon | 3,243 | 55.85 | +6.39 |
| Liberal | Thomas Frederick Waugh | 2,564 | 44.15 | -6.39 |
| Total | | 5,807 | 100 | |

Saskatchewan provincial by-election, October 25, 1928: Arm River
| Party | Candidate | Votes | % | ±% |
|---|---|---|---|---|
| Liberal | Thomas Frederick Waugh | 2,764 | 50.54 | -4.14 |
| Conservative (historical) | Stewart Adrain | 2,705 | 49.46 | +4.14 |
| Total | | 5,469 | 100 | |

1925 Saskatchewan general election: Arm River
| Party | Candidate | Votes | % | ±% |
|---|---|---|---|---|
| Liberal | George Adam Scott | 1,799 | 54.68 | -1.31 |
| Conservative (historical) | Stewart Adrain | 1,491 | 45.32 | +1.31 |
| Total | | 3,290 | 100 | |

1921 Saskatchewan general election: Arm River
| Party | Candidate | Votes | % | ±% |
|---|---|---|---|---|
| Liberal | George Adam Scott | - | - | - |
| Acclaimation | | - | - | |

1917 Saskatchewan general election: Arm River
| Party | Candidate | Votes | % | ±% |
|---|---|---|---|---|
| Liberal | George Adam Scott | 1,968 | 55.99 | -4.38 |
| Conservative (historical) | James Henry Middagh | 1,547 | 44.01 | +17.38 |
| Total | | 3,515 | 100 | |

1912 Saskatchewan general election: Arm River
| Party | Candidate | Votes | % | ±% |
|---|---|---|---|---|
| Liberal | George Adam Scott | 1,138 | 60.37 | +7.33 |
| Conservative (historical) | Clement Whitelock | 502 | 26.63 | -20.33 |
| Independent | John Gibson | 245 | 13.00 | - |
| Total | | 1,885 | 100 | |

1908 Saskatchewan general election: Arm River
| Party | Candidate | Votes | % | ±% |
|---|---|---|---|---|
| Liberal | George Adam Scott | 777 | 53.04 | - |
| Provincial Rights | B. J. Bott | 688 | 46.96 | - |
| Total | | 1,445 | 100 | |

== See also ==
- List of Saskatchewan provincial electoral districts
- List of Saskatchewan general elections
- Canadian provincial electoral districts
