= George Fredrick Loken =

Canadian politician

George Fredrick Loken (August 9, 1906 – August 25, 1975) was a business owner and political figure in Saskatchewan. He represented Rosetown from 1964 to 1975 in the Legislative Assembly of Saskatchewan as a Liberal.

He was born in Elstow, Saskatchewan and was educated there. Loken worked in a bank from 1923 to 1927, then worked in the real estate business until 1931 and, following that, operated a farm implement and automobile dealership until 1964. He served on the town council for Rosetown and was a member of the local Chamber of Commerce.
