= Rosetown (provincial electoral district) =

Former provincial electoral district in Saskatchewan, Canada

Coordinates: 51°33′N 107°59′W

Rosetown was a provincial electoral district for the Legislative Assembly of the province of Saskatchewan, Canada, centred on the community of Rosetown.

Created before the 3rd Saskatchewan general election in 1912, this district was dissolved and combined with the Elrose constituency (as Rosetown-Elrose) before the 18th Saskatchewan general election in 1975. It is now part of a revived Rosetown-Elrose constituency.

== Members of the Legislative Assembly ==
#	MLA	Served	Party
1.	Cephas Barker Mark	1912 – 1917	Liberal
2.	William Thompson Badger	1917 – 1921	Conservative
3.	John Andrew Wilson	1921 – 1929	Liberal
4.	Nathaniel Given	1929 – 1934	Conservative
5.	Neil McVicar	1934 – 1944	Liberal
6.	John T. Douglas	1944 – 1960	CCF
7.	Allan Stevens	1960 – 1964	CCF
8.	George Loken	1964 – 1975	Liberal

== Election results ==
1912 Saskatchewan general election: Rosetown electoral district
Party	Candidate	Votes	%	±%
Liberal	Cephas Barker Mark	997	55.36%	–
Conservative	Carnaby Willis Ferry	804	44.64%	–
Total		1,801	100.00%	

1917 Saskatchewan general election: Rosetown electoral district
Party	Candidate	Votes	%	±%
Conservative	William Thompson Badger	2,151	45.46%	+0.82
Liberal	John Andrew Wilson	2,080	43.95%	-11.41
Independent	Thomas Alexander Sterling Campbell	501	10.59%	–
Total		4,732	100.00%	

1921 Saskatchewan general election: Rosetown electoral district
Party	Candidate	Votes	%	±%
Liberal	John Andrew Wilson	2,735	52.65%	+8.70
Independent Conservative	William Thompson Badger	2,460	47.35%	+1.89
Total		5,195	100.00%	

1925 Saskatchewan general election: Rosetown electoral district
Party	Candidate	Votes	%	±%
Liberal	John Andrew Wilson	1,932	40.13%	-12.52
Progressive	Harry W. Ellis	1,573	32.68%	–
Conservative	James Cobban	1,309	27.19%	-20.16
Total		4,814	100.00%	

1929 Saskatchewan general election: Rosetown electoral district
Party	Candidate	Votes	%	±%
Conservative	Nathaniel Given	3,440	53.05%	+25.86
Liberal	John Andrew Wilson	2,212	34.12%	-6.01
Economic Group	Wilfrid Albert Sibbald Tegart	832	12.83%	
Total		6,484	100.00%	

1934 Saskatchewan general election: Rosetown electoral district
Party	Candidate	Votes	%	±%
Liberal	Neil McVicar	2,433	37.92%	+3.80
Conservative	Nathaniel Given	2,105	32.81%	-20.24
Farmer-Labour	Wilfrid Albert Sibbald Tegart	1,878	29.27%	+16.44
Total		6,416	100.00%	

1938 Saskatchewan general election: Rosetown electoral district
Party	Candidate	Votes	%	±%
Liberal	Neil McVicar	2,449	36.25%	-1.67
CCF	John T. Douglas	1,941	28.73%	-0.54
Social Credit	William J. Loucks	1,415	20.94%	-
Conservative	Andrew Wilson	951	14.08%	-18.73
Total		6,756	100.00%	

1944 Saskatchewan general election: Rosetown electoral district
Party	Candidate	Votes	%	±%
CCF	John T. Douglas	3,168	52.12%	+23.39
Liberal	William Leith	1,864	30.67%	-5.58
Prog. Conservative	John Wilbert Stewart	1,046	17.21%	+3.13
Total		6,078	100.00%	

1948 Saskatchewan general election: Rosetown electoral district
Party	Candidate	Votes	%	±%
CCF	John T. Douglas	3,647	53.12%	+1.00
Prog. Conservative	Alvin Hamilton	3,218	46.88%	+29.67
Total		6,865	100.00%	

1952 Saskatchewan general election: Rosetown electoral district
Party	Candidate	Votes	%	±%
CCF	John T. Douglas	3,922	64.07%	+10.95
Liberal	M.A. Longworth	2,199	35.93%	-
Total		6,121	100.00%	

1956 Saskatchewan general election: Rosetown electoral district
Party	Candidate	Votes	%	±%
CCF	John T. Douglas	3,250	53.52%	-10.55
Liberal	Peter Donald McGregor	1,756	28.91%	-7.02
Social Credit	James Clifford Hamel	1,067	17.57%	–
Total		6,073	100.00%	

1960 Saskatchewan general election: Rosetown electoral district
Party	Candidate	Votes	%	±%
CCF	Allan Stevens	2,657	40.39%	-13.13
Liberal	James Peter Cheyne	2,014	30.61%	+1.70
Prog. Conservative	Raymond Michael Reilly	1,291	19.62%	-
Social Credit	Wilbert Gordon Jeffery	617	9.38%	-8.19
Total		6,579	100.00%	

1964 Saskatchewan general election: Rosetown electoral district
Party	Candidate	Votes	%	±%
Liberal	George Loken	2,573	40.61%	+10.00
CCF	Allan Stevens	2,367	37.36%	-3.03
Prog. Conservative	Les Patterson Hickson	1,396	22.03%	+2.41
Total		6,336	100.00%	

1967 Saskatchewan general election: Rosetown electoral district
Party	Candidate	Votes	%	±%
Liberal	George Loken	2,951	47.15%	+6.54
NDP	Harry David Link	2,446	39.08%	+1.72
Prog. Conservative	Earl Keeler	862	13.77%	-8.26
Total		6,259	100.00%	

1971 Saskatchewan general election: Rosetown electoral district
Party	Candidate	Votes	%	±%
Liberal	George Loken	3,078	49.48%	+2.33
NDP	Robert D. Loewen	2,953	47.48%	+8.40
Independent	Dale R. Skelton	189	3.04%	-10.73
Total		6,220	100.00%	

== See also ==
- List of Saskatchewan provincial electoral districts
- List of Saskatchewan general elections
- Canadian provincial electoral districts
