= John Joseph Keelan =

Canadian politician (1888–1946)

John Joseph Keelan (November 27, 1888 – 1946) was a lawyer and political figure in Saskatchewan. He represented Happyland from 1925 to 1929 in the Legislative Assembly of Saskatchewan as a Liberal.

He was born in Mildmay, Ontario, the son of Harry Keelan and Amelia Kerringer, and was educated there, in Walkterton and at Manitoba University. In 1918, Keelan married Florence Axford. He lived in Prelate, Saskatchewan. Keelan did not run for reelection in 1929 due to ill health. In 1937, he was hired as a solicitor by the provincial Income and Education Tax Department. Keelan died in Regina at the age of 57.
