= Daniel Cameron Lochead =

Canadian politician

Daniel Cameron Lochead (January 19, 1878 – March 14, 1946) was a physician, farmer and political figure in Saskatchewan. He represented Gull Lake from 1912 to 1917 as a Liberal.

He was born in Almonte, Ontario and educated at Trinity College and the Toronto Medical School, receiving his M.D. Lochead moved to Wales, North Dakota, where he practised medicine from 1906 to 1910. In 1910, he moved to Saskatchewan, settling north of Gull Lake. Lochead married Mrs. Ann Hill (née Frank). He raised pigs on his farm. Lochead served in the army during World War I. In 1921, he moved to Minnesota. Lochead served as deputy medical commissioner of health for Rochester from 1924 to 1937, working with Dr. Charles Horace Mayo, and became health officer for the city in 1937, serving until his retirement in 1944.
