= John Percival Lyle =

Canadian politician

John Percival Lyle (July 14, 1878 – 1968) was a United Kingdom-born farmer, rancher, real estate agent and political figure in Saskatchewan. He represented Lloydminster in the Legislative Assembly of Saskatchewan from 1912 to 1917 as a Liberal.

He was born in Barnstable, Devonshire, the son of Samuel Lyle, was educated in England, and came to Canada in 1903. In 1905, he married Marie Lynch. Lyle was a lieutenant and quartermaster with the 22nd Saskatchewan Light Horse from 1908 to 1911. He settled in Lloydminster, Saskatchewan.
