= James Smith Aitken =

Canadian politician

James Smith Aitken (7 November 1881 – 29 July 1964) was a Scottish-born farmer and political figure in Saskatchewan, Canada. He represented Hanley from 1944 to 1948 in the Legislative Assembly of Saskatchewan as a Co-operative Commonwealth Federation (CCF) member.

Aitken was born in Pencaitland, East Lothian, Scotland to William Aitken and Jane Smith Aitken. He emigrated to Scotland in 1905, when he purchased a farm near Cheviot, Saskatchewan in 1905. Aitken married Elizabeth Goodale. After his wife's death in 1937, he spent some time in Scotland and New Zealand before returning to Saskatchewan. After leaving politics, Aitken spent his winters in Victoria, British Columbia.
