= Henry Lisle =

Canadian politician

Henry Claud Lisle (12 December 1848 – 1916) was an English-born lawyer and political figure in Saskatchewan, Canada. He represented Lloydminster in the Legislative Assembly of Saskatchewan from 1908 to 1912 as a Liberal.

He was born in Audlem, Cheshire, the son of Claud Lewis Lisle, and educated in Norwich, Norfolk. In 1870, Lisle married Elizabeth Corfield. He lived in Lloydminster, Saskatchewan.
