= Paul Peter Mostoway =

Canadian politician

Paul Peter Mostoway (October 16, 1929 – March 19, 2012) was an educator and political figure in Saskatchewan. He represented Hanley from 1971 to 1975 and Saskatoon Centre from 1975 to 1982 in the Legislative Assembly of Saskatchewan as a New Democratic Party (NDP) member.

He was born in Mayfair, Saskatchewan and was educated in Saskatoon. Mostoway worked as a sailor on the Great Lakes, as a construction worker in Kemano, British Columbia and as an auto worker for General Motors plant in Oshawa, Ontario. He then attended the University of Saskatchewan, receiving a BEd. From 1956 to 1988, Mostoway taught school in Kandahar, Allan and Clavet. He also served on Saskatoon city council from 1988 to 1994, was a member of the Saskatoon Catholic School Board and was a member of the senate for the University of Saskatchewan. He was defeated by Jack Sandberg when he ran for reelection to the provincial assembly in 1982. Mostoway died in Saskatoon at the age of 82.
