= Henry Theodore Halvorson =

Canadian politician (1883–1943)

Henry Theodore Halvorson (June 27, 1883 – June 27, 1943) was a lumber salesman and political figure in Saskatchewan. He represented Cypress in the Legislative Assembly of Saskatchewan from 1921 to 1929 as a Liberal.

He was born in Rushford, Minnesota, the son of Halvor Halvorson and Alena Thompson, both natives of Norway, and was educated at the University of Minnesota. Halvorson came to Canada in 1910. He served in France with the Canadian Machine Gun Corps during World War I. In 1922, Halvorson married Iona Jonasson. They lived in Eastend until 1928, when Halvorson moved to Regina to become head of the Child Welfare Bureau.
