= Clarence Stork =

Canadian politician

MLA for Shaunavon
- In office 1934–1938
- Preceded by: John Edward Gryde
- Succeeded by: riding abolished

Personal details
- Born: 9 October 1896 London, England
- Died: 3 February 1970 (aged 73) Ontario
- Party: Farmer-Labour Group
- Spouse(s): Louise Smith; Jean Sturdy

Clarence Stork (9 October 1896 – 3 February 1970) was an English-born farmer and political figure in Saskatchewan. He represented Shaunavon from 1934 to 1938 in the Legislative Assembly of Saskatchewan as a Farmer-Labour Group member.

He was born in London and came to Canada in 1913, finding employment as a railway worker. Stork served overseas with the Canadian Army during World War I and received the Distinguished Service Order. He married Louise Smith in London in 1918. In 1919, Stork bought a homestead near Eastend. His first wife died in 1936 and he married Jean Sturdy in 1938.

Stork was defeated when he ran for reelection in the Swift Current provincial riding in 1938. In October 1938, he refused to stand for nomination in the federal Maple Creek riding after his name was put forward. By the following year, he had become an organizer for the Liberal party.

Stork moved to Regina, where he was involved in the oil business, and later moved to Calgary. After the death of his second wife in 1958, he moved to London, Ontario, still employed in the oil industry. Stork became seriously ill in 1968 and died two years later.
