= James Cobban (politician) =

Canadian politician

James Cobban (November 24, 1870 – March 19, 1934) was a rancher and political figure in Saskatchewan. He represented Elrose from 1929 to 1934 in the Legislative Assembly of Saskatchewan as a Conservative.

He was born in Middlemiss, Ontario (near London), the son of Alexander Cobban and Rebecca Plain, and came to western Canada in 1890. Cobham married Annie Campbell in 1902. Cobham ran unsuccessfully for the Middlesex West seat in the Canadian House of Commons in 1911 and the Rosetown seat in the provincial assembly in 1925 before being elected for Elrose in 1929. He became ill while shipping cattle in the fall of 1933 and spent the winter in the hospital in Rosetown. Cobham travelled to Regina for the opening of the 1934 session in March but he died soon afterwards.
