= William Thompson Badger =

Canadian politician

William Thompson Badger (May 2, 1884 – August 6, 1926) was a farmer and political figure in Saskatchewan. Born in Manitoba he was the son of William Badger and Maggie Thompson, in 1908 he married Anna Isabelle McKerlie.

His political career began in 1914 when he served as mayor of Outlook, Saskatchewan. He then represented Rosetown in the Legislative Assembly of Saskatchewan from 1917 to 1921 as a Conservative MPP until he was defeated by John Andrew Wilson.
