= Notukeu (electoral district) =

Former provincial electoral district in Saskatchewan, Canada

Coordinates: 49°35′N 106°55′W

Notukeu (/ˈnɒtəkjuː/) was a provincial electoral division for the Legislative Assembly of the province of Saskatchewan, Canada, located south of Old Wives Lake. This district was created before the 3rd provincial election in 1912 as "Pinto Creek", after the rural municipality and the creek that flows through it. Redrawn and renamed "Notukeu" for the 1917 provincial election, the constituency was dissolved and combined with the Willow Bunch district (as Notukeu-Willow Bunch) before the 9th provincial election in 1938.

It is now part of the Wood River constituency.

== Members of the Legislative Assembly ==
#	MLA	Served	Party
1.	Samuel Robert Moore	1912–1917	Liberal
2.	George Spence	1917–1926	Liberal
3.	Alexander Lothian Grant	June 1, 1926 – 1934	Liberal
4.	George Spence	1934–1938	Liberal

== Election results ==
1912 Saskatchewan general election: Pinto Creek electoral district
Party	Candidate	Votes	%	±%
Liberal	Samuel Robert Moore	440	57.00%	–
Conservative	Joseph Arthur Marcotte	332	43.00%	–
Total		772	100.00%	

1917 Saskatchewan general election: Notukeu electoral district
Party	Candidate	Votes	%	±%
Liberal	George Spence	1,285	41.09%	-15.91
Nonpartisan League	William Stuart Simpson	970	31.02%	–
Conservative	Joseph Arthur Marcotte	872	27.89%	-15.11
Total		3,127	100.00%	

1921 Saskatchewan general election: Notukeu electoral district
Party	Candidate	Votes	%	±%
Liberal	George Spence	Acclaimed	100.00%	
Total		Acclamation		

1925 Saskatchewan general election: Notukeu electoral district
Party	Candidate	Votes	%	±%
Liberal	George Spence	1,604	71.61%	-
Progressive	John Wesley Orr	636	28.39%	-
Total		2,240	100.00%	

June 1, 1926 By-Election: Notukeu electoral district
Party	Candidate	Votes	%	±%
Liberal	Alexander Lothian Grant	2,078	66.73%	-4.88
Independent	Andrew Graham McCaw	1,036	33.27%	–
Total		3,114	100.00%	

1929 Saskatchewan general election: Notukeu electoral district
Party	Candidate	Votes	%	±%
Liberal	Alexander Lothian Grant	2,761	54.63%	-12.10
Conservative	John Wilkinson	2,293	45.37%	-
Total		5,054	100.00%	

1934 Saskatchewan general election: Notukeu electoral district
Party	Candidate	Votes	%	±%
Liberal	George Spence	2,196	41.79%	-12.84
Conservative	P. M. McKinnon	1,560	29.69%	-15.68
Farmer-Labour	Conrad Rieder	1,499	28.52%	–
Total		5,255	100.00%	

== See also ==
- List of Saskatchewan provincial electoral districts
- List of Saskatchewan general elections
- Canadian provincial electoral districts
