= Wilhelm Paulson =

Canadian politician

Wilhelm Hans Paulson (August 14, 1857 – April 25, 1935) was a Canadian provincial politician. He was a Liberal member of the Legislative Assembly of Saskatchewan.

Paulson was born in Iceland, the son of Paul Erlendson Paulson, and came to Canada in 1883. He was educated at home by his parents and also self-taught. In 1897, he married Anna Kristin Johnson. Paulson was a hardware merchant. He ran unsuccessfully for the Gimli seat in the Manitoba assembly in 1910. Paulson worked as a Canadian government official promoting colonization of the Canadian West from 1896 to 1905.

First elected in 1912 for Quill Plains, he was re-elected in 1917, 1924, 1925, and 1929 in Wynyard, a new name for the same electoral district.
