= Nathaniel Given =

Canadian politician

Nathaniel Given (September 13, 1875 – August 8, 1950) was a businessman and political figure in Saskatchewan. He represented Rosetown in the Legislative Assembly of Saskatchewan from 1929 to 1934 as a Conservative.

He was born near Ballinafad, Ontario, the son of John Given and Mary A. Kirkwood, and was educated in Georgetown. He came west in 1906. In 1910, Given married Christina Buttrey. He lived in Delisle, Saskatchewan. Given was defeated by Neil McVicar when he ran for reelection to the Saskatchewan assembly in 1934. He served as provincial grand master for the Orange Lodge.
