= Isaac Stirling =

Canadian politician

Isaac Stirling (April 8, 1866 – October, 1935) was a rancher and political figure in Saskatchewan. He represented Cypress in the Legislative Assembly of Saskatchewan from 1917 to 1921 as a Liberal.

He was born in Clinton, Canada West, the son of Robert Sterling and Christina Gardiner, and came to Manitoba during the 1890s. Around 1899, he settled in the Cypress Hills area, where he established a homestead and raised cattle. Stirling operated a post office on Battle Creek from 1903 to 1907. In 1908, he moved south of Consul. He died at the age of 69 and was buried in the Consul cemetery.
