= Susan Shortreed =

American biostatistician

Susan Marlene Shortreed is an American biostatistician whose research focuses on analyzing complex longitudinal data from electronic health records in order to develop treatment strategies in personalized medicine. She is a senior investigator for the Kaiser Permanente Washington Health Research Institute, and an affiliate professor of biostatistics at the University of Washington.

== Education and career ==
Shortreed majored in statistics as an undergraduate at the University of Michigan, graduating in 2001. She continued her studies in statistics at the University of Washington, where she received a master's degree in 2004 and completed her Ph.D. in 2006. Her doctoral dissertation, Learning in Spectral Clustering, was supervised by Marina Meilă.

After postdoctoral research at Monash University in Australia and McGill University in Canada, she joined the Group Health Research Institute in Seattle as an assistant investigator in 2010. Group Health was acquired by Kaiser Permanente in 2017, with its research institute becoming the Kaiser Permanente Washington Health Research Institute; meanwhile, Shortreed became an associate investigator in 2014 and senior investigator in 2019. She has held an affiliate faculty position with the University of Washington since 2013.

== Recognition ==
Shortreed was named as a Fellow of the American Association for the Advancement of Science in 2020, and as a Fellow of the American Statistical Association in 2022.
