= George Wilson Robertson =

Canadian politician

George Wilson Robertson (1889 – 1963) was a Scottish-born farmer and political figure in Saskatchewan. He represented Wynyard in the Legislative Assembly of Saskatchewan from 1921 to 1924 as an independent member.

He was born in Dumfries and was educated there. He came to Canada in 1909 and settled near Wynyard, Saskatchewan in 1914. Robertson resigned his seat in the provincial assembly in 1924 to become secretary for the Saskatchewan Wheat Pool and served in that post until 1958. He represented Canadian wheat growers at international conferences in Rome, London, Washington and Geneva. Robertson was part of the Canadian delegation at the conference which led to the signing of the first International Wheat Agreement. He also served on the board of governors of the University of Saskatchewan and was a public school trustee for Regina.
