= James Walter MacNeill =

Dr. James MacNeill (March 24, 1873 – July 1, 1945) was the first superintendent of Saskatchewan Hospital, North Battleford for mentally ill patients in the province of Saskatchewan.

He was born in Prince Edward Island, educated at Prince of Wales College and McGill University, where he received an MD degree in 1901. He practiced in New Brunswick and then moved to Hanley, Saskatchewan in 1906 where he practiced as family physician until 1912. He was elected to the Saskatchewan Legislature in 1908 as a Liberal member until 1913. He traveled to England and the USA in 1913, where he studied the administration mental hospitals for his new role as the medical superintendent of Saskatchewan Hospital. He served in this position until 1945.

At Saskatchewan Hospital, he changed the organization and program delivery from that of a prison and asylum to that of a modern (for the time) mental health hospital. He valued moral therapy - the use of productive work for its therapeutic value. During his tenure, a farm project and golf course were built on the hospital grounds. He established a 2-year attendant training program in 1930 and at the Weyburn Mental Hospital, where the province's second mental health hospital was built in 1921.

His other contributions were reform of housing for the mentally handicapped in Saskatchewan and building of the Moose Jaw Training School. He died shortly following his retirement in June 1945. He had received an honorary degree from the University of Saskatchewan in 1941. The child and youth mental health clinic in Saskatoon was named MacNeill Clinic from the 1950s to 1994, when the Saskatoon Health Region absorbed all community mental health services into Saskatoon City Hospital and Royal University Hospital.
