= Gerald Muirhead =

Canadian politician (1931–2020)

Gerald Stanley Muirhead (April 8, 1931 – 23 May 2020) was a Canadian provincial politician. He was the Progressive Conservative member of the Legislative Assembly of Saskatchewan for the constituency of Arm River, from 1978 until 1995. As representative of the Arm River riding, he was preceded by New Democrat Donald Leonard Faris and followed by Liberal Harvey McLane. He died May 23, 2020, at the age of 89.
