= Cypress (former Saskatchewan provincial electoral district) =

Former provincial electoral district in Saskatchewan, Canada

Coordinates: 49°36′N 108°46′W

Cypress is a former provincial electoral district for the Legislative Assembly of the province of Saskatchewan, Canada. This district was created before the 3rd Saskatchewan general election in 1912 as "Gull Lake". Since the district encompassed most of the Saskatchewan side of the Cypress Hills, the riding was renamed "Cypress" in 1917. Redrawn and renamed "Shaunavon" before 1934, the constituency was abolished before the 9th Saskatchewan general election in 1938.

It is now part of the Cypress Hills and Wood River constituencies.

== Members of the Legislative Assembly ==
#	MLA	Served	Party
1.	Daniel C. Lochead	1912–1917	Liberal
2.	Isaac Stirling	1917–1921	Liberal
3.	Henry T. Halvorson	1921–1929	Liberal
4.	John Edward Gryde	1929–1934	Conservative
5.	Clarence Stork	1934–1938	Farmer-Labour

== Election results ==
=== Gull Lake (1912–1917) ===
1912 Saskatchewan general election: Gull Lake electoral district
Party	Candidate	Votes	%	±%
Liberal	Daniel C. Lochead	637	51.08%	–
Conservative	James Beck Swanston	610	48.92%	–
Total		1,247	100.00%	

=== Cypress (1917–1934) ===
1917 Saskatchewan general election: Cypress electoral district
Party	Candidate	Votes	%	±%
Liberal	Isaac Stirling	1,929	53.60%	+2.52
Conservative	James Beck Swanston	1,670	46.40%	-2.52
Total		3,599	100.00%	

1921 Saskatchewan general election: Cypress electoral district
Party	Candidate	Votes	%	±%
Liberal	Henry T. Halvorson	Acclaimed	100.00%	
Total		Acclamation		

1925 Saskatchewan general election: Cypress electoral district
Party	Candidate	Votes	%	±%
Liberal	Henry T. Halvorson	1,760	77.16%	-
Progressive	Robert James Masters	521	22.84%	–
Total		2,281	100.00%	

1929 Saskatchewan general election: Cypress electoral district
Party	Candidate	Votes	%	±%
Conservative	John Edward Gryde	2,947	66.42%	-
Liberal	Lucien Tourigny	1,490	33.58%	-43.58
Total		4,437	100.00%	

=== Shaunavon (1934–1938) ===
1934 Saskatchewan general election: Shaunavon electoral district
Party	Candidate	Votes	%	±%
Farmer-Labour	Clarence Stork	2,061	37.87%	-
Liberal	Harry Ostlund	1,911	35.12%	+1.54
Conservative	John Edward Gryde	1,470	27.01%	-39.41
Total		5,442	100.00%	

== See also ==
- List of Saskatchewan provincial electoral districts
- List of Saskatchewan general elections
- Canadian provincial electoral districts
