= Murdo Cameron =

Canadian politician

Murdo Cameron (February 24, 1863 – February 17, 1938) was a Scottish-born farmer and political figure in Saskatchewan. He represented Saskatoon County in the Legislative Assembly of Saskatchewan from 1917 to 1921 as a Liberal.

He was born in Sutherland county, the son of John Cameron and Henrietta McKay, and was educated in Scotland. Cameron served as tutor for an English family and then served 18 years in the British civil service. He married Ellen Collins in 1888. In 1903, he came to Canada, settling in Saskatoon, Saskatchewan, where he became involved in farming. Cameron served as president of the Saskatchewan Association of Rural Municipalities. He was named chairman for the Saskatchewan Assessment Commission in 1922 and retired from the Commission in 1934. He served as an alderman for Regina City Council in 1935 and was chairman of the board of governors for Regina General Hospital.
