= Kindersley (former provincial electoral district) =

Former provincial electoral district in Saskatchewan, Canada

Coordinates: 51°17′N 109°30′W

Kindersley is a former provincial electoral district for the Legislative Assembly of the province of Saskatchewan, Canada. This constituency was created before the 3rd Saskatchewan general election in 1912. The district was dissolved and combined with the Kerrobert riding (as Kerrobert-Kindersley) before the 9th Saskatchewan general election in 1938.

It is now part of the present-day Kindersley constituency.

== Members of the Legislative Assembly ==
#	MLA	Served	Party
1.	William Richard Motherwell	1912–1919	Liberal
2.	Wesley Harper Harvey	Nov. 13, 1919–1925	Farmer–Ind., Progressive
3.	Ebenezer Whatley	1925–1933	Progressive
4.	Louis Henry Hantelman	1934–1938	Farmer-Labour

== Election results ==
1912 Saskatchewan general election: Kindersley electoral district
Party	Candidate	Votes	%	±%
Liberal	William Richard Motherwell	1,004	52.32%	–
Conservative	James Melvin Toombs	915	47.68%	–
Total		1,919	100.00%	

1917 Saskatchewan general election: Kindersley electoral district
Party	Candidate	Votes	%	±%
Liberal	William Richard Motherwell	2,595	52.61%	+0.29
Conservative	Edward George Walker	2,338	47.39%	-0.29
Total		4,933	100.00%	

November 13, 1919 By-Election: Kindersley electoral district
Party	Candidate	Votes	%	±%
Farmer-Independent	Wesley Harper Harvey	Acclaimed		
Total		Acclaimation		

1921 Saskatchewan general election: Kindersley electoral district
Party	Candidate	Votes	%	±%
Progressive	Wesley Harper Harvey	3,054	72.73%	-
Liberal	Raymond Buggs Jones	1,145	27.27%	-
Total		4,199	100.00%	

1925 Saskatchewan general election: Kindersley electoral district
Party	Candidate	Votes	%	±%
Progressive	Ebenezer Whatley	2,232	57.57%	-15.16
Liberal	A.H. Shannon	1,645	42.43%	+15.16
Total		3,877	100.00%	

1929 Saskatchewan general election: Kindersley electoral district
Party	Candidate	Votes	%	±%
Progressive	Ebenezer Whatley	3,558	60.65%	+3.08
Liberal	Charles R.S. Stewart	2,308	39.35%	-3.08
Total		5,866	100.00%	

1934 Saskatchewan general election: Kindersley electoral district
Party	Candidate	Votes	%	±%
Farmer–Labour	Louis Henry Hantelman	2,649	39.06%	–
Liberal	John Clifford Treleaven	2,518	37.13%	-2.22
Conservative	Robert Henry Carruthers	1,615	23.81%	-
Total		6,782	100.00%	

== See also ==
- List of Saskatchewan provincial electoral districts
- List of Saskatchewan general elections
- Canadian provincial electoral districts
