= Reginald Stipe =

Canadian politician

Reginald Stipe (1883 – 1976) was a physician and political figure in Saskatchewan. He represented Hanley from 1925 to 1934 in the Legislative Assembly of Saskatchewan as a Progressive Party member.

He was educated at Toronto University and came to Watrous, Saskatchewan in 1908. Stipe became a member of the first town council the following year. He practised medicine there from 1909 until 1916, when he joined the British Medical Corps, serving overseas during World War I. He and Dr Ernest Hixon had established the first hospital in Watrous in 1914.

Stipe returned to Watrous in 1919 and resumed practice in partnership with Dr. Hixon. He served in the provincial cabinet as a minister without portfolio.

Stipe retired from the practice of medicine in 1949. With his wife Mary, he retired to Victoria, British Columbia. They moved to Duncan in 1956. After the death of his first wife, Stipe married Mabel Laing. He later moved to Vancouver.
