= Stephen Morrey =

Canadian politician

Stephen Morrey (1880–1921) was an English-born merchant, farmer and political figure in Saskatchewan. He represented Happyland in the Legislative Assembly of Saskatchewan from 1917 to 1921 as a Liberal.

Morrey owned a hardware business in Market Drayton, Shropshire. He married Amy Alice Young in England in 1905. In 1909, they came to Canada, because it was felt that drier air in Canada would help Morrey's lung problems, and settled on a homestead south of Shackleton, Saskatchewan. In 1913, with a partner, Morrey opened a hardware store in Shackleton. He served five years as reeve for the Regional Municipality of Miry Creek. Morrey organized the telephone company in Shackleton, helped organize the local school and worked with the Grain Growers. He was reelected in 1921 but died in office later that year from complications associated with lung disease.
