= Martin Pederson =

Saskatchewan politician and leader of the PC Party

Martin Pederson (December 5, 1921 – September 1, 2001) was a Canadian farmer, business owner and politician, who was leader of the Progressive Conservative Party of Saskatchewan from 1958 to 1968.

He was born on the family farm near Hawarden, Saskatchewan. Pederson served in the Royal Air Force during World War II. He was provincial president and national vice-president of the Young Conservative Association and president of the Saskatchewan Progressive Conservative Association before becoming provincial party leader. Pederson operated trucking and insurance companies as well as farming.

In the 1960 election, the first in which Pederson led the party, they won no seats in the Legislative Assembly of Saskatchewan. In the 1964 election, Pederson himself was the only PC MLA elected to the legislature. He was defeated in the 1967 election. He retired from the leadership the following year, and was succeeded by Ed Nasserden.

Pederson was chair of the Saskatchewan Liquor Board from 1983 to 1987.
