= Progressive Party of Saskatchewan =

- Founded: 1920s
- Dissolved: mid-1930s
- Ideology: Agrarianism; Progressivism; Social democracy
- Colours: Green

The Progressive Party of Saskatchewan was a provincial section of the Progressive Party of Canada, and was active from the beginning of the 1920s to the mid-1930s. The Progressives were an agrarian social democratic political movement. Dedicated to political and economic reform, the Progressive movement challenged economic policies that favoured the financial and industrial interests in Central Canada over agrarian and, to a lesser extent, labour interests. Like its federal counterpart, it favoured free trade over protectionism. The movement can be considered the first partisan expression of western alienation in Canada.

In Saskatchewan, the Progressive Party contested three general elections. In its final election in 1929, the party had five members elected, who joined a coalition government with J. T. M. Anderson's Conservative Party. In the mid-1930s, the agrarian social democratic mantle was taken up by the Co-operative Commonwealth Federation, which many Progressives joined.

== The Progressive movement ==
The Progressive movement grew out of farmer agitation across the Prairies for greater economic control and better economic conditions, including free trade and nationalization of the railways. Organized farmers issued "Farmers' Platforms" ahead of the 1911 and 1917 federal elections, and increasingly the agrarian pronouncements became animated with anti-capitalist and social gospel principles. By the end of the 1910s, dissatisfied with responses from the Liberal and Conservative parties, farmers became increasingly resolved to enter the political arena themselves.

Despite the dominance of agriculture in Saskatchewan, the Progressive Party of Saskatchewan was never able to match the success it and the United Farmers movement had in other provinces such as Alberta, where the United Farmers of Alberta governed from 1921 to 1935, Manitoba, where the Progressive Party of Manitoba was able to form government, or even Ontario, where the United Farmers of Ontario took power in 1919. This was largely because while in other provinces farmers organizations were increasingly alienated from mainline political parties, in Saskatchewan the ruling provincial Liberal Party made extra effort to ally itself with farmers' interests and worked closely with the Saskatchewan Grain Growers Association (SGGA) in particular, which, in turn, resisted efforts to create a farmers' party in the province. The Saskatchewan Liberal government itself had throughout the first decades of the twentieth century many members who were farmers, and the Liberals made a habit of consulting the SGGA about farm policy and of appointing prominent farm activists to cabinet such as Charles Dunning and John Maharg. Even so, a Saskatchewan Progressive Party was established, and throughout the 1920s its presence would prove consequential in provincial politics.

== Electoral participation ==
The Progressives ran seven candidates for the first time in the 1921 general election, and had six members elected to the Saskatchewan legislature despite the absence of a strong provincial organization due to the reluctance of the SGGA to break with the Liberal Party. The Liberals were re-elected with a large majority of 46 of 63 seats. However, local affinity for the Liberals did not extend to the federal arena, and Premier William Melville Martin created a political crisis when he explicitly campaigned against the federal Progressive Party in support of the Liberals ahead of the 1921 federal election. Progressive candidates won 15 of 16 Saskatchewan seats in the election. Agriculture Minister John Maharg, a former SGGA president, resigned from the Cabinet in response to Martin's campaigning and crossed the floor to sit as an Independent and become Leader of the Opposition. Martin himself was forced to step down in the aftermath.

The SGGA subsequently authorized the creation of local political action committees across the province to assist Progressive organization, but Progressives were unable to build significantly on the 1921 breakthrough. The SGGA did not sustain its commitment to independent political action, particularly after Premier Martin was replaced as Liberal leader and Premier by Charles Avery Dunning, a former SGGA activist and managing director of the Saskatchewan Co-operative Elevator Company. Dunning was able to regain the confidence of the official farmers movement and re-establish the Liberal Party's credentials as a farmer's party and in 1924 the SGGA decided again to withdrawal from electoral politics. Moreover, farming proved prosperous in the 1920s, blunting demands for extensive reform. The Progressives fielded just six candidates in the 1925 provincial election; however, all were elected and managed to capture nearly a quarter of the popular vote, earning Official Opposition status.

=== Coalition government ===
By 1929, Saskatchewan had seen more than two decades of continuous Liberal rule, the only governing party in provincial history. For the first time, anti-government forces coordinated in the 1929 election, with Progressive and Conservatives generally opting not to run candidates in the same districts. One group of "more militant Progressives" ran three candidates under the banner of the "Economic Group", borrowing elements from both the Progressive and Conservative platforms; none of the three candidates were elected. However, after running a distinctly nativist campaign buoyed by the support of the Ku Klux Klan, the Conservatives under leader James Anderson surged to second party status, winning 24 seats. The Liberals won 28 seats, leaving them short of a majority. On September 6, 1929, the five Progressive members joined the Conservatives in defeating the Liberals through a motion of non-confidence, and subsequently in a coalition government, allowing Anderson to become premier. One Progressive, Reginald Stipe, was appointed to Anderson's cabinet. The government, termed the "Co-operative government", was almost immediately faced with the onset of the Great Depression, which was particularly severe on the Canadian prairies.

== Collapse of the Progressives ==
While the Progressives moved to the right in supporting the Conservatives, farmers once again became radicalized and moved to the left due to the Depression. The SGGA had amalgamated with the Farmers' Union of Canada to form the United Farmers of Canada (Saskatchewan Section) in 1926. As a result of the Dust Bowl farm crisis during the Depression, the UFC became politicized and adopted a socialist platform. In 1930, in response to the Progressive-Conservative coalition, the UFC, under the leadership of George Hara Williams, decided to form a new political party. The decision signaled the demise of the Progressives.

In 1932, Williams' party joined with the Independent Labour Party to form the Farmer-Labour Group. Progressive MLA Jacob Benson joined the new party, while Charles Agar joined the opposition Liberals. Other Progressive MLAs either joined the Conservative Party or left politics. In the 1934 provincial election, the FLG had five MLAs elected to the legislature and became the Official Opposition, subsequently becoming the Saskatchewan section of the Co-operative Commonwealth Federation—FLG had been a founding component of the Co-operative Commonwealth Federation in 1932.

== Election results ==
The Saskatchewan Progressives contested three provincial elections, twice attaining second party status, and in 1929 holding the balance of power in a coalition government with the Conservative Party.

Election	Seats	Change	Place	Votes	%	Position
1921	6 / 63	▲6	▲3	13,613	7.5%	Second party
1925	6 / 63	6	2	57,142	23%	Official Opposition
1929	5 / 63	▼1	▼3	24,988	6.9%	Third party Coalition with Conservatives
