= 9th Saskatchewan Legislature =

The 9th Legislative Assembly of Saskatchewan was elected in the Saskatchewan general election held in June 1938. The assembly sat from January 19, 1939, to May 10, 1944. The Liberal Party led by William John Patterson formed the government. The Co-operative Commonwealth Federation (CCF) led by George Hara Williams formed the official opposition. After Williams resigned his seat to serve in the army in 1941, John Hewgill Brockelbank became house leader for the CCF.

Charles Agar served as speaker for the assembly.

== Members of the Assembly ==
The following members were elected to the assembly in 1938:

Electoral district	Member	Party	First elected / previously elected	No.# of term(s)
Arm River	Gustaf Herman Danielson	Liberal	1934	2nd term
Athabasca (Note: Election held July 28, 1938)	A. Jules Marion	Liberal	1926, 1938	3rd term*
Athabasca	Hubert Staines (1941)	Liberal	1941	1st term
Bengough	Herman Kersler Warren	Unity	1929, (Note: First elected as Conservative) 1938	2nd term*
Bengough	Herman Kersler Warren	Independent	1929, 1938	2nd term*
Biggar	John Allan Young	Co-operative Commonwealth	1938	1st term
Cannington	William John Patterson	Liberal	1921	5th term
Canora	Myron Henry Feeley	Co-operative Commonwealth	1938	1st term
Cumberland	Deakin Alexander Hall	Liberal	1913, 1922	7th term*
Cut Knife	William Roseland	Social Credit	1938	1st term
Elrose	Louis Henry Hantelman	Co-operative Commonwealth	1934	2nd term
Gravelbourg	Edward Milton Culliton	Liberal	1935	2nd term
Gull Lake	Harvey Harold McMahon	Liberal	1938	1st term
Hanley	Charles Agar	Liberal	1921	5th term
Humboldt	James Chisholm King	Liberal	1935	2nd term
Humboldt	Joseph William Burton (1938)	Co-operative Commonwealth	1938	1st term
Kelvington	Peter Anton Howe	Co-operative Commonwealth	1938	1st term
Kerrobert-Kindersley	Donald Laing	Liberal	1926, 1934	3rd term*
Kinistino	John Richard Parish Taylor	Liberal	1917, 1933	5th term*
Last Mountain	Jacob Benson	Co-operative Commonwealth	1929, (Note: First elected as Progressive) 1938	2nd term*
Lumsden	Robert Scott Donaldson	Liberal	1925, (Note: Thunder Creek) 1934	2nd term*
Maple Creek	John Joseph Mildenberger	Liberal	1934	2nd term
Meadow Lake	Donald MacDonald	Liberal	1934	2nd term
Melfort	Oakland Woods Valleau	Co-operative Commonwealth	1938	1st term
Melville	John Frederick Herman	Social Credit	1938	1st term
Milestone	William Pedersen	Liberal	1934	2nd term
Moose Jaw City	William Gladstone Ross	Liberal	1927, 1934	3rd term*
Moose Jaw City	William George Baker	Liberal	1921, (Note: First elected as a Labour) 1938	3rd term*
Moosomin	Arthur Thomas Procter	Liberal	1934	2nd term
Morse	Benjamin Thomas Hyde	Liberal	1938	1st term
Notukeu-Willow Bunch	Charles William Johnson	Liberal	1929	3rd term
Pelly	Reginald John Marsden Parker	Liberal	1929	3rd term
Prince Albert	Thomas Clayton Davis	Liberal	1925	4th term
Qu'Appelle-Wolseley	Frederick Middleton Dundas	Liberal	1934	2nd term
Qu'Appelle-Wolseley	Harold John Fraser (1939)	Liberal	1939	1st term
Redberry	Orest Zerebko	Liberal	1938	1st term
Regina City	Percy McCuaig Anderson	Liberal	1934	2nd term
Regina City	Bamm David Hogarth	Liberal	1938	1st term
Regina City	Bernard J. McDaniel (1938)	Liberal	1938	1st term
Rosetown	Neil McVicar	Liberal	1934	2nd term
Rosthern	John Michael Uhrich	Liberal	1921	5th term
Saltcoats	Joseph Lee Phelps	Co-operative Commonwealth	1938	1st term
Saskatoon City	James Wilfred Estey	Liberal	1934	2nd term
Saskatoon City	Robert Mitford Pinder	Liberal	1938	1st term
Shellbrook	Omer Alphonse Demers	Liberal	1934	2nd term
Souris-Estevan	Norman Leslie McLeod	Liberal	1931	3rd term
Swift Current	James Gordon Taggart	Liberal	1934	2nd term
The Battlefords	John Albert Gregory	Liberal	1934	2nd term
The Battlefords	Paul Prince (1940)	Liberal	1940	1st term
Tisdale	John Hewgill Brockelbank	Co-operative Commonwealth	1938	1st term
Torch River	James Archibald Kiteley	Liberal	1938	1st term
Touchwood	Tom Johnston	Co-operative Commonwealth	1938	1st term
Turtleford	William Franklin Kerr	Liberal	1929	3rd term
Wadena	George Hara Williams	Co-operative Commonwealth	1934	2nd term
Watrous	Frank Stephen Krenn	Liberal	1938	1st term
Weyburn	George Levi Crane	Liberal	1938	1st term
Wilkie	John Cunningham Knowles	Liberal	1938	1st term
Yorkton	Alan Carl Stewart	Unity	1929, (Note: First elected as Independent/Conservative) 1938	2nd term*
Yorkton	Alan Carl Stewart	Independent	1929, 1938	2nd term*

== Party Standings ==
Affiliation	Members
Liberal	38
Co-operative Commonwealth	10
Social Credit	2
Unity	2
Total	52
Government Majority	24

== By-elections ==
By-elections were held to replace members for various reasons:

Electoral district	Member elected	Party	Election date	Reason
Humboldt	Joseph William Burton	Co-operative Commonwealth	August 4, 1938	JC King resigned seat to allow CM Dunn to run for an assembly seat
Regina City	Bernard J. McDaniel	Liberal	November 24, 1938	PM Anderson named a judge
Prince Albert	Harold John Fraser	Liberal	October 16, 1939	TC Davis named a judge
The Battlefords	Paul Prince	Liberal	June 26, 1940	J Gregory ran for federal seat
Athabasca	Hubert Staines	Liberal	July 28, 1941	AJ Marion died in 1941
