= Allan Blakeney =

Premier of Saskatchewan from 1971 to 1982

The Honourable Allan Blakeney PC OC SOM QC FRSC
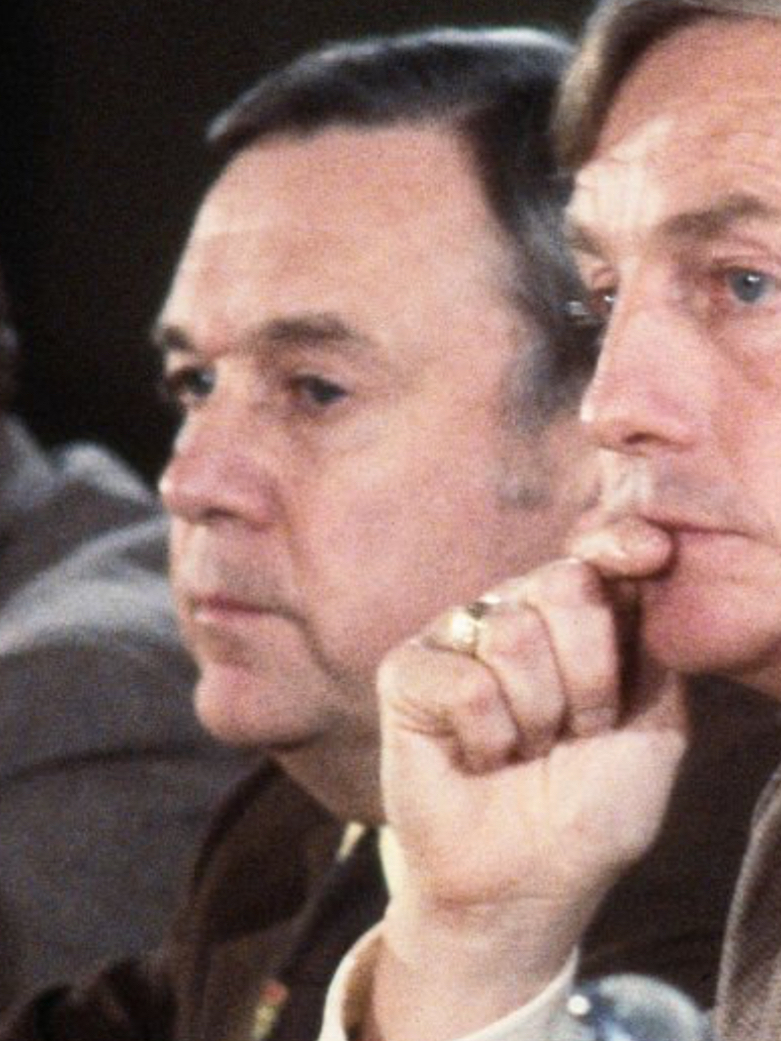
- Blakeney in 1980

10th Premier of Saskatchewan
- In office June 30, 1971 – May 8, 1982
- Monarch: Elizabeth II
- Lieutenant Governor: Stephen Worobetz; George Porteous; Irwin McIntosh
- Preceded by: Ross Thatcher
- Succeeded by: Grant Devine

Leader of the Opposition (Saskatchewan)
- In office July 4, 1970 – June 30, 1971
- Preceded by: Woodrow Lloyd
- Succeeded by: David Steuart
- In office May 8, 1982 – November 7, 1987
- Preceded by: Eric Berntson
- Succeeded by: Roy Romanow

Member of the Legislative Assembly of Saskatchewan for Regina City
- In office June 8, 1960 – April 22, 1964 Serving with Charles C. Williams, Marjorie Cooper, Edward C. Whelan
- Preceded by: Clarence Melvin Fines
- Succeeded by: District divided

Member of the Legislative Assembly of Saskatchewan for Regina West
- In office April 22, 1964 – October 11, 1967 Serving with Marjorie Cooper
- Preceded by: District divided
- Succeeded by: District abolished

Member of the Legislative Assembly of Saskatchewan for Regina Centre
- In office October 11, 1967 – June 11, 1975
- Preceded by: District created
- Succeeded by: District renamed

Member of the Legislative Assembly of Saskatchewan for Regina Elphinstone
- In office June 11, 1975 – March 21, 1988
- Preceded by: District renamed
- Succeeded by: Dwain Lingenfelter

President of the New Democratic Party
- In office 1969–1971
- Preceded by: James Renwick
- Succeeded by: Donald C. MacDonald

Personal details
- Born: Allan Emrys Blakeney; September 7, 1925 Bridgewater, Nova Scotia, Canada
- Died: April 16, 2011 (aged 85) Saskatoon, Saskatchewan, Canada
- Party: New Democratic Party
- Spouse: Anne Gorham
- Children: 4
- Education: Dalhousie University; Queens College, Oxford

Allan Emrys Blakeney PC OC SOM QC FRSC (September 7, 1925 – April 16, 2011) was a Canadian politician who served as the tenth premier of Saskatchewan from 1971 to 1982. Originally from Bridgewater, Nova Scotia, Blakeney moved to Regina, Saskatchewan, and worked in the province's civil service before running for office with the Co-operative Commonwealth Federation (CCF) under Tommy Douglas. Blakeney became leader of the Saskatchewan New Democratic Party (NDP) in 1970. Altogether, he was a member of the Legislative Assembly of Saskatchewan from 1960 to 1988.

Before he was premier, Blakeney played a key role in the implementation of the first Canadian public health insurance program (Medicare) in 1962. As premier, Blakeney's government nationalized the potash industry, created a range of new crown corporations such PotashCorp and SaskOil, and fought with the federal government over resource rights and taxation. Blakeney's NDP reformed labour legislation and introduced the Saskatchewan Human Rights Commission. Blakeney was also a key figure in the negotiations surrounding Patriation of the Canadian Constitution in the early 1980s, and in the development of the Constitution's Charter of Rights and Freedoms. After retiring from politics, Blakeney taught and wrote about constitutional law for more than two decades.

== Early life and career ==
Blakeney was born in Bridgewater, Nova Scotia on September 7, 1925. He attended Dalhousie University in Halifax and earned a degree in history and political science, followed by a law degree from Dalhousie Law School, winning a gold medal. He was awarded a Rhodes Scholarship and attended Queen's College, Oxford, where he played for the Oxford University Ice Hockey Club, making an appearance at the 1948 Spengler Cup tournament. At Oxford, he earned a bachelor's degree, second class, in politics, philosophy. and economics. Although he grew up in a conservative household—his father worked as an election scrutineer for the Conservatives in Nova Scotia—Blakeney's time in law school, the events of the Second World War, and his experience in postwar England, where Clement Attlee's Labour government was actively building the British welfare state, all inclined him towards government intervention in meeting the needs of citizens. His eventual embrace of the CCF is said to have caused a "mild scandal in Bridgewater."

After graduating from Oxford, Blakeney returned to Canada and passed the Nova Scotia bar exam in 1950. That same year he married and took a job with the Saskatchewan civil service, prompting a move to Regina. Blakeney was attracted to the province due to the innovation of Tommy Douglas' CCF administration, which in 1944 had become the first social democratic government elected in North America. Blakeney later stated that he initially intended to stay in Saskatchewan for only a couple of years, explaining that "Saskatchewan was the end of the Earth to me in 1950". However, he found the work engaging, and during the 1950s he became a senior civil servant. His first wife, Molly, with whom he had two children, died suddenly in 1957. He married his second wife, Anne, in 1959, and the couple would raise four children altogether.

== Early political career (1960–1971) ==
=== CCF/NDP MLA ===
By the end of the 1950s, Blakeney decided to enter politics himself. He first ran as a CCF candidate in the 1960 election at a time when electoral districts elected multiple members for the Legislative Assembly (MLAs). Blakeney was one of four MLAs elected for Regina City—he would go on to represent a Regina-based riding without interruption until his retirement in 1988, including Regina Elphinstone from 1975 onward.

Blakeney served as a cabinet minister in the governments of Douglas and—when Douglas resigned to become leader of the federal New Democratic Party—Woodrow Lloyd, until the government was defeated in the 1964 election. In cabinet, he served as minister of education, provincial treasurer, and most prominently as minister of health. In that role, he helped implement Medicare in the province, including helping to resolve the 1962 Saskatchewan doctors' strike.

In 1969, Blakeney was elected national president of the federal NDP, succeeding James Renwick. He held the position until 1971, when he was succeeded by Donald MacDonald.

=== NDP leadership ===
In 1964, the party was defeated by Ross Thatcher's Liberals after five consecutive terms in government. The defeat, coming on the heels of the protracted Medicare battle, prompted a transition period for the party, now in Opposition. In 1967, the party fully adopted the NDP name. Around the same time, the party—both provincially and nationally—became gripped with a factional dispute with a growing left-wing movement called "The Waffle". The Waffle advocated for a return to the party's socialist roots, including through the nationalization of key industries. The movement had a strong base in Saskatchewan, the historic NDP stronghold. However, it was divisive. While its Manifesto for an Independent Socialist Canada was defeated in a vote at the 1969 federal NDP convention, Woodrow Lloyd voted in support of it, believing in the manifesto's potential to revitalize debate in the party. That episode, and resistance to Lloyd's willingness to open the party to debate, contributed to Lloyd's decision to resign as leader in 1970. Blakeney decided to run in the 1970 leadership election to succeed Lloyd.

Blakeney was joined in the race by young lawyer Roy Romanow, who had joined the caucus in 1967; Waffle candidate Don Mitchell; and labour candidate George Taylor. Blakeney's motivation was principally to continue the legacy of the CCF in building and maintaining the welfare state. While Mitchell had a strong showing in the leadership election, Blakeney ultimately defeated Romanow on the final ballot. The result was seen as a victory for the party establishment over the Waffle. However, once he became leader, a priority for Blakeney was uniting the party and he would prove open to some of the movement's proposals.

== Premier of Saskatchewan (1971–1982) ==
Blakeney's first election platform as leader was titled "A New Deal for People", and it offered an ambitious social democratic agenda premised on state intervention in the economy and strong support for organized labour, and promising expanded health and social programs, including drug and children's dental programs, housing development, and increased supports for the poor and elderly. In the 1971 provincial election, Blakeney defeated Thatcher's Liberals and led the NDP to power with their highest ever share of the popular vote at 55%.

One of Blakeney's key priorities was putting together a strong cabinet and building a robust civil service, which had been significantly weakened by Thatcher, who had prioritized a smaller government. Blakeney believed in evidence-based policy and relied heavily on the professional civil service and delegation to cabinet ministers. In terms of policy, the government quickly enacted extensive labour reforms, for example making it easier for workers to organize and guaranteeing the right to collectively bargain. The NPD also established legal aid and the Saskatchewan Human Rights Commission.

One of the NDP's earliest and most controversial initiatives was the creation of a Land Bank for agricultural land. An attempt to address rural decline, driven in part through agricultural consolidation and the weakening of the family farm, the Bank could purchase available land and then lease it to young farmers, guaranteeing them tenure but also providing the option to purchase the land after a five-year term. Blakeney also introduced programs to stabilize crop prices, retain transportation links, and modernize rural life. Blakeney later stated that he looked back "ruefully" on the government's uneven efforts to stem the tide of corporatization in agriculture, citing the extremely high costs—such as those borne by many European states—as a barrier to true success.

Blakeney's government was resource nationalist, and he saw mineral resource development as a key to achieving the government's goals. The advent of the Energy Crisis in the 1970s, which resulted in a rapid rise in energy commodity prices, made resource development a priority, and Blakeney relied on a state-led model of development. Above all, Blakeney believed that the primary beneficiaries of resource development in the province needed to be its citizens rather than the corporate sector. The NDP created new crown corporations such as SaskOil, a relatively small enterprise mainly concerned with exploration, and the Saskatchewan Mining Development Corporation, which became a key developer of the province's significant uranium reserves. The province also went to court with the federal government over resource taxation, and joined with Alberta in its opposition to the federal National Energy Program, which exacerbated a new wave of western alienation sentiment. The province's most significant decision was to nationalize the potash industry in 1976. These developments were not without controversy. The potash industry was initially shocked by nationalization, but the province managed to arrange purchase agreements and never had to expropriate any mines. Uranium development, meanwhile, proved contentious within the NDP as environmental and peace activists favoured a moratorium on the resource. However, the Blakeney government also created a Department of the Environment, introduced environmental assessment standards, and held a number of public inquiries into resource projects.

Like CCF premiers Douglas and Lloyd, Blakeney placed an emphasis on sound fiscal management. The government's significant spending on social programs was largely offset by its new ventures in resource development along with high royalties. Blakeney not only presented a succession of surplus budgets, but established a Heritage fund for the province, saving surplus resource revenues for future economic challenges. With this record, Blakeney's NDP were comfortably re-elected in the 1975 and 1978 provincial elections.

=== Patriation negotiations ===
Given his legal background, Blakeney was intensely interested in constitutional matters, and he played an important role in the federal-provincial negotiations that led to the 1982 Patriation of the Canadian Constitution. One priority was ensuring the recognition of provincial rights over natural resources in the Constitution; to this end, Blakeney worked closely with Alberta premier Peter Lougheed to negotiate those rights, which were ultimately enshrined in Section 92A of the Constitution. Blakeney was also instrumental in the development of Section 33 of the Charter of Rights and Freedoms, which enshrined the notwithstanding clause and thus preserved a preeminent role in legislation for elected governments over appointed courts. After an initial draft without it was agreed to, Blakeney and his team also ensured the ultimate inclusion of Section 35, which enshrined Indigenous rights in the Constitution. This was achieved when other negotiators insisted on changes to ensure that sexual equality rights could not be subject to the notwithstanding clause; Blakeney stated that he would agree to such a change only if Section 35 was re-inserted.

== Late political career (1982–1988) ==
Blakeney sought a fourth consecutive term in the 1982 provincial election. However, his government was defeated by Grant Devine's Progressive Conservatives. The scope of the defeat was surprising: the NDP lost 35 of its 44 seats, its 9 elected members marking the smallest presence for the party since the 1930s. The result has been attributed to a variety of factors. The national economy was struggling. Public fatigue with constitutional matters made the NDP vulnerable to charges that they had lost touch with issues on the ground in Saskatchewan. The party also lost significant union support—normally a bulwark for the NDP—ahead of the election due both to its support for federal wage and price controls and for conflicts with organized labour late in its term, including legislating hospital staff back to work in 1982. It has also been noted that the NDP saw a significant decrease in support among female voters, which could be attributable to its labour dispute with the female-dominated hospital workers, constitutional negotiations, or, as has been speculated, a lack of female representation in the NDP government. In addition, Devine and his PCs ran an aggressive campaign on the slogan, "There's so much more we can be", promising more private business opportunities along with tax and interest relief.

Despite the defeat, Blakeney decided to stay on as Opposition leader. Blakeney led the party into the 1986 provincial election, and particularly after a string of deficit budgets from the PCs, reversing the 1982 result appeared possible. In the election, the NDP narrowly edged the PCs in the popular vote. However, the PCs—who secured a $1 billion farming aid package from Brian Mulroney's federal Progressive Conservative government on the eve of the election—managed to ride a dominant performance in rural Saskatchewan into a second term. Although the NDP more than doubled its seat-count to 25, it was a disappointing result for Blakeney. In 1987, he announced that he would be resigning as party leader and MLA when a new leader was chosen. In November of that year, Romanow was acclaimed as Blakeney's successor. In March 1988, Dwain Lingenfelter held Blakeney's former Regina Elphinstone seat for the NDP in a by-election.

== After politics ==
After retiring from politics, Blakeney took a two-year chair teaching constitutional law at Osgoode Hall at Toronto's York University. He then accepted the inaugural Law Foundation Chair at the University of Saskatchewan School of Law in Saskatoon, and remained a visiting scholar there. Blakeney served as a consultant to the Romanow government in the 1990s, and served on a number of boards, including the board of Cameco, a uranium company formed by the merger of the former Saskatchewan Mining Development Corporation and the former federal Eldorado crown corporation. Blakeney was a past president of the Canadian Civil Liberties Association.

In the 1990s, Blakeney worked on an International Development Research Centre project advising the African National Congress in South Africa. The project mainly entailed discussions ahead of the 1994 national elections, and Blakeney helped to advise on the nuances of federal political systems. The same decade, Blakeney spent time in the former Soviet republics of Russia and Kyrgyzstan—Cameco operated one of the largest gold mines in the latter—advising legislators and government.

Blakeney co-authored Political Management in Canada with Sandford Borins, with whom he worked at Osgoode Hall. The book, released in 1992, offers Blakeney's perspective and experience on governance and social democracy. Blakeney published his memoirs in 2008.

=== Death ===
Blakeney died on April 16, 2011, at his home in Saskatoon of complications from cancer. Federal NDP leader Jack Layton dedicated his 2011 federal election campaign to Blakeney after he died halfway through the campaign. Approximately 600 people attended his memorial, including federal NDP leaders Layton and Ed Broadbent, former provincial premiers Roy Romanow, Lorne Calvert, Peter Lougheed, Ed Schreyer, Bill Davis, and Bob Rae, as well as Saskatchewan premier Brad Wall.

=== Honours ===
On April 30, 1992, Blakeney was appointed as an Officer of the Order of Canada for his work as premier, his contribution to the field of public administration, and for his role as a key player in introducing the first comprehensive public medical health care plan in Canada. In 2000, he was awarded the Saskatchewan Order of Merit, and in 2001, he was made a Fellow of the Royal Society of Canada. He received honorary degrees from the University of Saskatchewan, the University of Regina, York University, Mount Allison University, and Western University.

In 2017, Regina's adult campus, where adults aged 18 to 21 who did not complete high school can obtain secondary school credits, was renamed the Allan Blakeney Adult Campus in his honour. There is also a memorial plinth for Blakeney in Wascana Centre, near the Saskatchewan Legislative Building.

== Legacy ==
Blakeney was closely involved in Saskatchewan government and politics from the 1950s into the 1990s, actually sitting in government for nearly the entirety of the 1960s through the 1980s. As such, he played a significant role in the province's political and social development, while his influence also extended beyond the province. Within Saskatchewan, Blakeney's government has been seen as the last truly social democratic government in the CCF tradition, whose "progressive creativity" helped to shape the province's political institutions. This legacy is clearly seen in the province's continued tradition of supporting its crown corporations, which were a major focus of Blakeney's government. Blakeney's government has been called "the most innovative in Canadian history."

Beyond Saskatchewan, Blakeney's legacy has been widely acknowledged, especially in health care and constitutional matters. Although Blakeney was first elected as a CCF MLA in 1960 in what was effectively a referendum election on public health insurance in the province, he played a critical role in navigating the doctors' strike that nearly derailed the legislation and in implementing the program in its aftermath as the Minister of Health. Only a few years later, Canada implemented Medicare nationwide. Blakeney was also critical in negotiations leading to Patriation of the Canadian Constitution in 1982. His legacy is noted especially in Sections 35 and 92a, as well as Section 33 of the Charter of Rights and Freedoms. The notwithstanding clause remains controversial in Canada. For his part, Blakeney argued that it was an important check on appointed courts by democratically elected governments; while courts could rule on certain legal rights, they had less purview to rule on moral rights—such as the right to healthcare—that can only be enacted and enforced by governments. In essence, Blakeney asserted that certain rights should not be given precedence over others because they were included in the Charter. Overall, Blakeney saw the Charter as incomplete for protecting only individual and not collective rights.

== Electoral record ==
Electoral history of NDP under Allan Blakeney
Year	Party	Votes			Seats		Position
Year	Party	Total	%	±%	Total	±	Position
1971	NDP	248,978	55%	+10.6%	45 / 60	+21	Majority government
1975	NDP	180,700	40.1%	−14.9%	39 / 61	−6	Majority government
1978	NDP	228,791	48.1%	+8.1%	44 / 61	+5	Majority government
1982	NDP	201,390	37.6%	−10.4%	9 / 64	−35	Official Opposition
1986	NDP	247,683	45.2%	+7.6%	25 / 64	+16	Official Opposition

Constituency elections

1986 Saskatchewan general election: Regina Elphinstone
Party	Candidate	Votes	%
New Democratic	Allan Blakeney	5,288	70.90
Progressive Conservative	Al Empringham	1,678	22.50
Liberal	Don McGregor	492	6.60
Total number of valid votes		7,458	100.00
Source: Saskatchewan Archives - Election Results by Electoral Division

1982 Saskatchewan general election: Regina Elphinstone
Party	Candidate	Votes	%
New Democratic	Allan Blakeney	4,139	55.48
Progressive Conservative	J. Ross Reibling	3,066	41.10
Liberal	Glenn Caleval	255	3.42
Total number of valid votes		7,460	100.00
Source: Saskatchewan Archives - Election Results by Electoral Division

1978 Saskatchewan general election: Regina Elphinstone
Party	Candidate	Votes	%
New Democratic	Allan Blakeney	4,390	70.40
Progressive Conservative	Christine Whitaker	1,250	20.04
Liberal	R. Lawson Wilde	596	9.56
Total number of valid votes		6,236	100.00
Source: Saskatchewan Archives - Election Results by Electoral Division

1975 Saskatchewan general election: Regina Elphinstone
Party	Candidate	Votes	%
New Democratic	Allan Blakeney	4,096	58.98
Liberal	Donna Welke	1,474	21.23
Progressive Conservative	Arthur Cropley	1,374	19.79
Total number of valid votes		6,944	100.00
Source: Saskatchewan Archives - Election Results by Electoral Division

1971 Saskatchewan general election: Regina Centre
Party	Candidate	Votes	%
New Democratic	Allan Blakeney	9,804	69.7
Liberal	Ben Freitag	4,252	30.3
Total number of valid votes		14,056	100.0
Source: Saskatchewan Archives - Election Results by Electoral Division

1967 Saskatchewan general election: Regina Centre
Party	Candidate	Votes	%
New Democratic	Allan Blakeney	4,363	57.1
Liberal	Pat McKerral	2,442	31.9
Progressive Conservative	Les Youngson	698	9.1
Social Credit	Nelson Falkowsky	142	1.9
Total number of valid votes		7,645	100.0
Source: Saskatchewan Archives - Election Results by Electoral Division

1964 Saskatchewan general election: Regina West
Party	Candidate	Votes	%	Elected
Co-operative Commonwealth	Allan Blakeney	9,076	24.71	✓
Co-operative Commonwealth	Marjorie Alexandra Cooper	8,413	22.90	✓
Liberal	Alex Cochrane	7,770	21.15	
Liberal	Betty Sear	6,981	19.00	
Progressive Conservative	Donald K. MacPherson	4,495	12.23	
Total number of valid votes		36,735	100.00	
Source: Saskatchewan Archives - Election Results by Electoral Division

1960 Saskatchewan general election: Regina City
Party	Candidate	Votes	%	Elected
Co-operative Commonwealth	Charles Cromwell Williams	23,425	11.14	✓
Co-operative Commonwealth	Allan Blakeney	22,382	10.64	✓
Co-operative Commonwealth	Marjorie Alexandra Cooper	22,205	10.56	✓
Co-operative Commonwealth	Ed Whelan	21,806	10.37	✓
Liberal	Frederick William Johnson	16,662	7.92	
Liberal	Leslie Charles Sherman	16,316	7.76	
Liberal	James Gillis Collins	15,578	7.41	
Liberal	Mavis Jeanne Adams	14,589	6.94	
Progressive Conservative	John Leishman	7,944	3.78	
Social Credit	Henry Austin Hunt	7,652	3.64	
Social Credit	Bert Louis Iannone	7,206	3.43	
Progressive Conservative	M. A. MacPherson	7,194	3.42	
Social Credit	G. Lindsay Bower	7,103	3.38	
Social Credit	William G. Gemlin	7,058	3.36	
Progressive Conservative	Donald Bowman	6,358	3.02	
Progressive Conservative	Walter Schmidt	5,175	2.46	
Independent	Leslie Hibbs	698	0.33	
Independent	Herbert Kenneth Cooper	624	0.30	
Communist	William C. Beeching	345	0.16	
Total number of valid votes		210,237	100.00	
Source: Saskatchewan Archives - Election Results by Electoral Division

== See also ==
- List of premiers of Saskatchewan

== References and further reading ==
- Blakeney, Allan (2008). An Honourable Calling: Political Memoirs. Toronto: University of Toronto Press. ISBN 978-0-8020-9891-7. OCLC 227928829
- Gruending, Dennis (1990). Promises to Keep: A political biography of Allan Blakeney. Saskatoon, Sask.: Western Producer Prairie Books. ISBN 0-88833-324-2. OCLC 28115877.
- McGrane, David; Whyte, John D.; Romanow, Roy; and Isinger, Russell, eds. (2019). Back to Blakeney: Revitalizing the Democratic State. Regina, Sask.: University of Regina Press. ISBN 9780889776821 OCLC 1090178443
