= William Wensley Smith =

Canadian politician

William Wensley Smith (1888–1955) was a Canadian who founded W.W. Smith Insurance Ltd., one of the oldest insurance brokerages in Saskatchewan, Canada. It is located in the city of Swift Current, where it had its beginnings in 1913.

When William Wensley Smith, an Englishman from Woolwich, immigrated to Canada in 1903 as a teenager, he didn't have much more than the shirt on his back and a few shillings in his pocket. However, he did have a letter of introduction from his pastor, vouching for him as a hard-working fellow of good character. Smith used that letter to get started in his new, adopted homeland, and eventually became very successful in life and business.

William Wensley Smith, or WW as he was better known, worked as a farm labourer in Manitoba before settling in Qu'Appelle, Saskatchewan, where he spent a few years as an employee in a general store. From there he made his way to Regina, where he worked in the life insurance business with the Confederation Life Association. Smith arrived in Swift Current in 1913, just a year before it was incorporated as a city. It was a unique time in Saskatchewan's history. Agriculture was very dominant, and the period was marked by rapid population growth, surpassing neighbouring Alberta during the 1920s.

When he arrived in Swift Current, Smith formed a partnership with an acquaintance, Alexander Wallace, and the two became official agents of Confederation Life. Their company, known then as Wallace & Smith, later expanded into buying and selling real estate.

In 1914, Smith married Islay Fyffe, the daughter of a staff sergeant in the Royal North-West Mounted Police, and they eventually had four children: Elizabeth, Jack, William Jr., and Jerry. They settled into one of Swift Current's finest homes. In 1920, Smith's association with Wallace ended, and Smith partnered with John Paisley to establish W.W. Smith Agency, a general insurance agency.

The company continued to offer life insurance, and also became an agent for a Winnipeg-based savings and loan association, later representing the Crescent Finance Corporation of Saskatoon, specializing in farming loans. "Through the loan business, he gave lots of people their start around here", said Gord Smith, Smith's grandson. According to Jerry Smith, W.W. Smith was an outstanding life insurance salesman and one of the top agents in the area: "He sold a million dollars' worth of life insurance at one point during the 1920s, which was quite a feat at the time". Smith remembers his father as very friendly and someone who genuinely liked people. He'd go out of his way to meet them. "During the later years, when I joined the firm, he liked to stand outside the office and greet everybody...and he never really retired, he just slowed up a bit."

In the 1920s, he served four years as an alderman and later became Swift Current's mayor for two years. In 1929, the year of the stock market crash and the advent of the Depression, Smith moved up the political ladder. He was elected to the Legislative Assembly of Saskatchewan as a Conservative member. "He was known as Machine-Gun Smith in the legislature for his rapid-fire speaking style", Gord Smith said. Smith served in the government of James Thomas Milton Anderson during a time of severe economic hardship, social upheaval, and bitter political rivalries. Drought brought the province to its knees, striking a severe blow to agriculture.

Smith was passionate about the outdoors and enjoyed hunting upland game birds. In 1931, he helped persuade the government to create and fund the Cypress Hills Interprovincial Park, located almost next door to Swift Current. Today, the park is a destination point for tourists and campers.

Cypress Hills, which straddles the Alberta-Saskatchewan border and is the highest point between Labrador and the Rocky Mountains, is an area similar to that of the Black Hills of South Dakota, where prairie suddenly meets pine. There are small lakes, streams, and majestic, soaring hills. It became Canada's only interprovincial park when space in Alberta was designated as parkland in the 1950s, and is adjacent to historic Fort Walsh, the North-West Mounted Police post established in 1878.

William Wensley Smith died in 1955 at the age of 67. A diabetic, the illness probably shortened his life. His wife Islay survived him for another 30 years. She died in 1985, at the age of 94.

Preceded by David Sykes	MLA Swift Current; 1929-1934	Succeeded by James Taggart
