= John Penner =

Canadian politician

John Penner (December 12, 1931 – March 5, 2003) was an educator and political figure in Saskatchewan. He represented Swift Current from 1991 to 1995 in the Legislative Assembly of Saskatchewan as a New Democratic Party (NDP) member.

He was born in Swift Current, Saskatchewan and grew up on the family farm. Penner received a BA and BEd from the University of Saskatchewan. He taught school for over 30 years and was vice-principal and principal in a Swift Current high school. After retiring from teaching, Penner operated the Parkside Memorial Funeral Home in Swift Current. He also served 12 years as president of the Western Credit Union Board. Penner was an alderman for the city of Swift Current before entering provincial politics. He ran unsuccessfully for a seat in the provincial assembly in 1986, losing to Patricia Anne Smith, before being elected in 1991. Penner served in the Saskatchewan cabinet as Minister of Energy and Mines and as Associate Minister of Finance. He retired from cabinet in February 1995 after suffering a mild heart attack and undergoing bypass surgery. He did not run for reelection. He died at home in Swift Current of heart failure at the age of 71.
