= William John Finley Warren =

Canadian politician

William John Finley Warren (December 14, 1873 – 1963) was a farmer, rancher and political figure in Saskatchewan. He represented Thunder Creek in the Legislative Assembly of Saskatchewan from 1921 to 1925 as a Progressive Party member.

He was born in Balderson near Perth, Ontario, the son of Richard Warren and Margaret James, and was educated at the Saskatchewan Agricultural College. He settled in Balbeck, Saskatchewan in 1906. In 1911, Warren married Annie M. James. He was president of the Moose Jaw Agricultural Society, of the Saskatchewan Registered Seed Grower's Association and of the Saskatchewan Agricultural Societies' Association. Warren was defeated by Robert Scott Donaldson when he ran for reelection to the provincial assembly in 1925.
