= 1970 Saskatchewan New Democratic Party leadership election =

- July 4, 1970
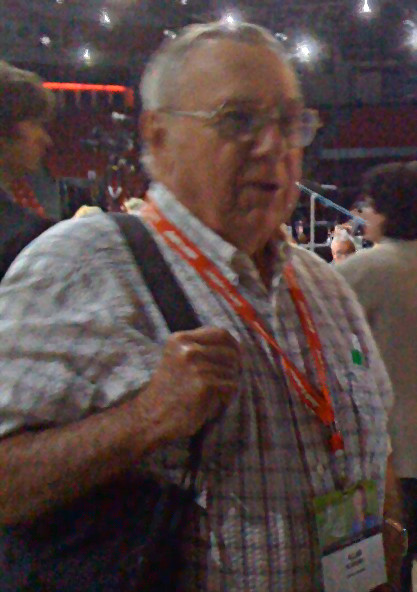

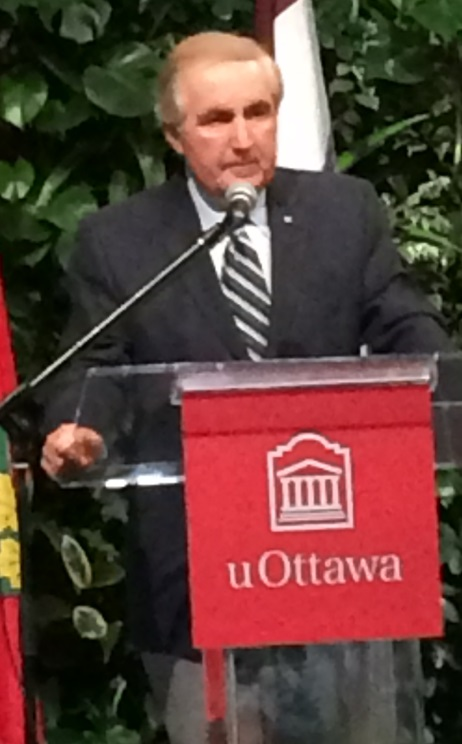
Candidate	Allan Blakeney	Roy Romanow	Don Mitchell
Riding	Regina Centre	Saskatoon Riversdale	None
Final ballot	407 (53.84%)	349 (46.16%)	Eliminated
Second ballot	311 (36.59%)	320 (37.65%)	219 (25.67%)
First ballot	286 (33.61%)	300 (35.35%)	187 (21.97%)
Candidate	George Taylor
Riding	None
Final ballot	Eliminated
Second ballot	Eliminated
First ballot	78 (9.17%)
Leader before election
Woodrow Lloyd
Elected Leader
Allan Blakeney

1970 Saskatchewan New Democratic Party leadership election
- Date: July 4, 1970
- Convention: Regina Armoury, Regina
- Resigning leader: Woodrow Lloyd
- Won by: Allan Blakeney
- Ballots: 3
- Candidates: 4

The 1970 Saskatchewan New Democratic Party leadership election was held on July 4, 1970, to elect a successor to Woodrow Lloyd as leader of the Saskatchewan New Democratic Party. The election was necessary because Lloyd had announced his intention to step down as leader in March 1970 after concluding he had lost the support of much of the New Democratic caucus. Allan Blakeney won on the third ballot, defeating Roy Romanow.

== Background ==
Woodrow Lloyd had led the Saskatchewan NDP in the previous two provincial elections in 1964 and 1967, finishing second both times. Lloyd's politics subsequently began to shift to the left as the 1960s progressed; notably, he was one of the most high-profile New Democrats to support the Manifesto for an Independent Socialist Canada. This prompted ideological tensions within the party, which combined with Lloyd's failure to win government in 1964 and 1967, caused his support within the party's caucus to erode. After a particularly contentious caucus meeting in March 1970, he offered his resignation, effective once a new leader was elected.

Allan Blakeney was considered to be the front runner from the outset of the leadership race. He was a political veteran, and had previously served as Minister of Health and Minister of Education under both Tommy Douglas and Lloyd.

Roy Romanow was a relative political newcomer, at just 30 years old and serving his first term in the Legislative Assembly of Saskatchewan. He was considered the most centrist of the candidates.

Both Don Mitchell and George Taylor represented the socialist left wing of the party. Mitchell was the youngest candidate, and was associated with NDP's Waffle faction. Meanwhile Taylor was a former member of the Communist Party and had been a supporter of Lloyd during his turn to the left.

During the leadership vote, Mitchell declined to endorse a candidate in the final round; with him and many of his supporters choosing to abstain. Taylor opted to support Blakeney in the final round.

== Candidates ==
=== Allan Blakeney ===
Allan Blakeney was the MLA for Regina Centre. He was first elected in the 1960 provincial election. Blakeney was also concurrently serving as the president of the federal New Democratic Party, a role he had assumed in 1969. Before entering politics, he was a civil servant.

=== Roy Romanow ===
Roy Romanow was the MLA for Saskatoon Riversdale. He was first elected in the 1967 provincial election. Before entering politics, he was a lawyer.

=== George Taylor ===
George Taylor was a member of Saskatoon City Council, having been elected in 1965. He was previously the NDP candidate for Saskatoon—Humboldt in the 1968 federal election. Before entering politics, he was a labour lawyer and had also served in the Mackenzie–Papineau Battalion during the Spanish Civil War.

== Ballot results ==
First Ballot
Candidate	Votes	Percentage
Roy Romanow	300	35.25
Allan Blakeney	286	33.61
Don Mitchell	187	21.97
George Taylor	78	9.17
Total	851	100.00

Second Ballot
Candidate	Weighted Votes	Percentage	+/-
Roy Romanow	320	37.65	+2.40
Allan Blakeney	311	36.59	+2.98
Don Mitchell	219	25.67	+3.70
Total	850	100.00	

Third Ballot
Candidate	Weighted Votes	Percentage	+/-
Allan Blakeney	407	53.84	+17.25
Roy Romanow	349	46.16	+8.51
Total	756	100.00	
