= Harold Lilly =

Harold Lilly may refer to:

- Harold Alexander Lilly (1885–1936), farmer, car dealer and political figure in Saskatchewan
- Harold Lilly (songwriter), American songwriter
