= Harry Gibbs (politician) =

Canadian politician

Harry Gibbs (January 27, 1893 – 1966) was an English-born boilermaker and political figure in Saskatchewan. He represented Swift Current from 1944 to 1956 in the Legislative Assembly of Saskatchewan as a Co-operative Commonwealth Federation (CCF) member.

He was born in Rochdale, Lancashire, the son of Thomas Edward Gibbs and Hannah Townsend, and came to Canada in 1911. Gibbs served in the Canadian Expeditionary Force during World War I. In 1917, he married Grace May Fordham. Gibbs served on the council for Swift Current, Saskatchewan.
