= John Wall (Canadian politician) =

Canadian politician (1938–2010)

John Vern Wall (March 13, 1938 – April 22, 2010) was an educator and political figure in Saskatchewan. He represented Swift Current from 1995 to 1999 in the Legislative Assembly of Saskatchewan as a New Democratic Party (NDP) member.

He was born in Swift Current, Saskatchewan and was educated at the Moose Jaw Normal School and at the University of Saskatchewan, receiving a BEd in 1968. Wall taught elementary school from 1957 to 1967 and then was a junior high principal until his retirement in 1988. He was defeated by Brad Wall (no relation) when he ran for reelection to the assembly in 1999. He died in 2010.
