= Swift Current (provincial electoral district) =

Provincial electoral district in Saskatchewan, Canada

Coordinates: 50°22′N 107°48′W

Saskatchewan electoral district

Provincial electoral district
- Legislature: Legislative Assembly of Saskatchewan
MLA
Everett Hindley
Saskatchewan
- District created: 1908
- First contested: 1908
- Last contested: 2024

Demographics
- Population (2016): 16,604
- Electors: 10,911
- Communities: Swift Current

Swift Current is a provincial electoral district for the Legislative Assembly of Saskatchewan, Canada. Located in southwestern Saskatchewan, it was created for the 2nd Saskatchewan general election in 1908. The riding consists almost entirely of the city of Swift Current, except for a rural area bordering the west side of the city.

Two Saskatchewan premiers have been elected from this constituency — Thomas Walter Scott, the first premier of the province; and Brad Wall, the 14th premier.

== Members of the Legislative Assembly ==
Legislature	Years	Member	Party
2nd	1908–1912	Thomas Walter Scott	Liberal
3rd	1912–1917	Thomas Walter Scott	Liberal
4th	1917–1921	David John Sykes	Independent
5th	1921–1925	David John Sykes	Independent
6th	1925–1929	David John Sykes	Liberal
7th	1929–1934	William Wensley Smith	Progressive Conservative
8th	1934–1938	James Gordon Taggart	Liberal
9th	1938–1944	James Gordon Taggart	Liberal
10th	1944–1948	Harry Gibbs	Co-operative Commonwealth Federation
11th	1948–1952	Harry Gibbs	Co-operative Commonwealth Federation
12th	1952–1956	Harry Gibbs	Co-operative Commonwealth Federation
13th	1956–1960	Everett Irvine Wood	Co-operative Commonwealth Federation
14th	1960–1964	Everett Irvine Wood	Co-operative Commonwealth Federation
15th	1964–1967	Everett Irvine Wood	Co-operative Commonwealth Federation
16th	1967–1971	Everett Irvine Wood	New Democratic Party
17th	1971–1975	Everett Irvine Wood	New Democratic Party
18th	1975–1978	Dennis Marvin Ham	Progressive Conservative
19th	1978–1980	Dennis Marvin Ham	Progressive Conservative
19th	1980–1982	Dennis Marvin Ham	Unionest Party
20th	1982–1986	Patricia Anne Smith	Progressive Conservative
21st	1986–1991	Patricia Anne Smith	Progressive Conservative
22nd	1991–1995	John Penner	New Democratic Party
23rd	1995–1999	John Wall	New Democratic Party
24th	1999–2003	Brad Wall	Saskatchewan Party
25th	2003–2007	Brad Wall	Saskatchewan Party
26th	2007–2011	Brad Wall	Saskatchewan Party
27th	2011–2016	Brad Wall	Saskatchewan Party
28th	2016–2018	Brad Wall	Saskatchewan Party
28th	2018–2020	Everett Hindley	Saskatchewan Party
29th	2020–2024	Everett Hindley	Saskatchewan Party
30th	2024–present	Everett Hindley	Saskatchewan Party

== Election results (1908–present) ==
2024 Saskatchewan general election
Party	Candidate	Votes	%	±%
Saskatchewan	Everett Hindley	4,849	66.42	-12.02
New Democratic	Jay Kimball	2,137	29.27	+9.44
Buffalo	Constance P Maffenbeier	216	2.96	–
Green	George Watson	98	1.34	-0.39
Total valid votes		7,300	98.10	
Total rejected ballots		141	1.89	+1.22
Turnout		7,441	–	–
Eligible voters		12,594		
Saskatchewan hold		Swing		–
Source: Elections Saskatchewan

2020 Saskatchewan general election
Party	Candidate	Votes	%	±%
Saskatchewan	Everett Hindley	5,620	78.44	+4.91
New Democratic	Stefan Rumpel	1,421	19.83	-4.38
Green	George Watson	124	1.73	+0.43
Total valid votes		7,165	99.33	
Total rejected ballots		48	0.67	+0.46
Turnout		7,213	–	–
Eligible voters		–		
Saskatchewan hold		Swing		–
Source: Elections Saskatchewan

Saskatchewan provincial by-election, March 1, 2018
Party	Candidate	Votes	%	±%
Saskatchewan	Everett Hindley	3,776	73.53	-8.91
New Democratic	Stefan Rumpel	1,243	24.21	+9.11
Green	Maria Rose Lewans	67	1.30	-0.09
Liberal	Aidan Roy	49	0.95	-0.10
Total valid votes		5,135	99.79	
Total rejected ballots		11	0.21	-0.23
Turnout		5,146	42.12	-18.43
Eligible voters		12,218		
Saskatchewan hold		Swing		-9.01

2016 Saskatchewan general election
Party	Candidate	Votes	%
Saskatchewan	Brad Wall	6,071	82.44
New Democratic	Hailey Clark	1,112	15.10
Green	George Watson	103	1.40
Liberal	Glenn D. Smith	78	1.06
Total valid votes		7,364	99.55
Total rejected ballots		33	0.45
Turnout		7,397	60.55
Eligible voters		12,216	
Source: Elections Saskatchewan

2011 Saskatchewan general election: Swift Current
Party	Candidate	Votes	%	±%
Saskatchewan	Brad Wall	6,021	80.97	+10.10
NDP	Aaron Ens	1,223	16.45	-6.95
Green	Amanda Huxted	192	2.58	+0.40
Total valid votes		7,436	99.79	
Total rejected ballots		16	0.21	-0.03
Turnout		7,452	68.30	-6.59
Eligible voters		10,911		
Saskatchewan hold		Swing		+8.52
Source: Elections Saskatchewan

2007 Saskatchewan general election: Swift Current
Party	Candidate	Votes	%	±%
Saskatchewan	Brad Wall	6,006	70.88	+12.51
NDP	Robert Hale	1,983	23.40	-13.24
Liberal	Justin Orthner	300	3.54	-1.45
Green	Gail Schroh	185	2.18	–
Total valid votes		8,474	99.75	
Total rejected ballots		21	0.25	+0.03
Turnout		8,495	74.89	+8.23
Eligible voters		11,343		
Saskatchewan hold		Swing		+12.88
Source: Elections Saskatchewan

2003 Saskatchewan general election
Party	Candidate	Votes	%
Saskatchewan	Brad Wall	4,312	58.36
NDP	Dean Smith	2,707	36.64
Liberal	Mike Burton	369	4.99
Total valid votes		7,388	99.78
Total rejected ballots		16	0.22
Turnout		7,404	66.66
Eligible voters		11,107	
Source: Elections Saskatchewan

1999 Saskatchewan general election: Swift Current
Party	Candidate	Votes	%	±%
Saskatchewan	Brad Wall	4,600	54.72%	–
NDP	John Wall	2,538	30.19%	-12.53
Liberal	Rhonda Thompson	1,269	15.09%	-10.88
Total		8,407	100.00%	

1995 Saskatchewan general election: Swift Current
Party	Candidate	Votes	%	±%
NDP	John Wall	3,515	42.72%	-8.24
Progressive Conservative	Allan Bridal	2,576	31.31%	-0.32
Liberal	Terry Brodziak	2,137	25.97%	+8.56
Total		8,228	100.00%	

1991 Saskatchewan general election: Swift Current
Party	Candidate	Votes	%	±%
NDP	John Penner	4,399	50.96%	+7.77
Progressive Conservative	Lawrence Bergreen	2,731	31.63%	-19.08
Liberal	Archie Green	1,503	17.41%	+11.87
Total		8,633	100.00%	

1986 Saskatchewan general election: Swift Current
Party	Candidate	Votes	%	±%
Progressive Conservative	Patricia Anne Smith	4,444	50.71%	-3.34
NDP	John Penner	3,785	43.19%	+9.77
Liberal	Archie Green	486	5.54%	+1.95
Western Canada Concept	Orland McInnes	49	0.56%	-8.38
Total		8,764	100.00%	

1982 Saskatchewan general election: Swift Current
Party	Candidate	Votes	%	±%
Progressive Conservative	Patricia Anne Smith	4,756	54.05%	+7.90
NDP	Spencer Wooff	2,941	33.42%	-8.50
Western Canada Concept	Henry Banman	787	8.94%	–
Liberal	Anna Patricia White	316	3.59%	-8.34
Total		8,800	100.00%	

1978 Saskatchewan general election: Swift Current
Party	Candidate	Votes	%	±%
Progressive Conservative	Dennis Ham	3,620	46.15%	+0.66
NDP	Spencer Wooff	3,288	41.92%	+9.99
Liberal	Stew Tasche	936	11.93%	-10.65
Total		7,844	100.00%	

1975 Saskatchewan general election: Swift Current
Party	Candidate	Votes	%	±%
Progressive Conservative	Dennis Ham	3,494	45.49%	-
NDP	Murray Walter	2,452	31.93%	-27.45
Liberal	Len Stein	1,734	22.58%	-18.04
Total		7,680	100.00%	

1971 Saskatchewan general election: Swift Current
Party	Candidate	Votes	%	±%
NDP	Everett Wood	6,423	59.38%	+9.28
Liberal	Jackson A. Running	4,394	40.62%	+5.67
Total		10,817	100.00%	

1967 Saskatchewan general election: Swift Current
Party	Candidate	Votes	%	±%
NDP	Everett Wood	4,825	50.10%	-2.89
Liberal	T. Lawrence Salloum	3,366	34.95%	-12.06
Progressive Conservative	Donald McGowan	1,439	14.95%	-
Total		9,630	100.00%	

1964 Saskatchewan general election: Swift Current
Party	Candidate	Votes	%	±%
CCF	Everett Wood	5,238	52.99%	+8.22
Liberal	T. Lawrence Salloum	4,647	47.01%	+19.56
Total		9,885	100.00%	

1960 Saskatchewan general election: Swift Current
Party	Candidate	Votes	%	±%
CCF	Everett Wood	4,292	44.77%	+1.53
Liberal	Edmund MacKenzie	2,631	27.45%	-3.39
Progressive Conservative	Thomas Garland	1,683	17.56%	-
Social Credit	Benjamin Letkeman	980	10.22%	-15.70
Total		9,586	100.00%	

1956 Saskatchewan general election: Swift Current
Party	Candidate	Votes	%	±%
CCF	Everett Wood	4,593	43.24%	-10.38
Liberal	Robert C. Dahl	3,276	30.84%	-7.15
Social Credit	Raymond Miller	2,753	25.92%	+17.53
Total		10,622	100.00%	

1952 Saskatchewan general election: Swift Current
Party	Candidate	Votes	%	±%
CCF	Harry Gibbs	5,171	53.62%	+2.74
Liberal	Charles Lee	3,663	37.99%	-11.13
Social Credit	John W. MacPherson	809	8.39%	-
Total		9,643	100.00%	

1948 Saskatchewan general election: Swift Current
Party	Candidate	Votes	%	±%
CCF	Harry Gibbs	5,273	50.88%	-2.56
Liberal	Clarence J. Orton	5,091	49.12%	+14.03
Total		10,364	100.00%	

1944 Saskatchewan general election: Swift Current
Party	Candidate	Votes	%	±%
CCF	Harry Gibbs	4,756	53.44%	+16.24
Liberal	James G. Taggart	3,123	35.09%	-16.32
Progressive Conservative	Bryan M. Hill	1,021	11.47%	-
Total		8,900	100.00%	

1938 Saskatchewan general election: Swift Current
Party	Candidate	Votes	%	±%
Liberal	James G. Taggart	4,953	51.41%	+16.29
CCF	Clarence Stork	3,584	37.20%	+4.75
Social Credit	Alfred C. Butterworth	1,097	11.39%	–
Total		9,634	100.00%	

1934 Saskatchewan general election: Swift Current
Party	Candidate	Votes	%	±%
Liberal	James G. Taggart	2,531	35.12%	-13.62
Farmer-Labour	Allan McCallum	2,339	32.45%	-
Conservative	William Wensley Smith	2,337	32.43%	-18.83
Total		7,207	100.00%	

1929 Saskatchewan general election: Swift Current
Party	Candidate	Votes	%	±%
Conservative	William Wensley Smith	2,851	51.26%	+9.83
Liberal	David John Sykes	2,711	48.74%	-9.83
Total		5,562	100.00%	

1925 Saskatchewan general election: Swift Current
Party	Candidate	Votes	%	±%
Liberal	David John Sykes	1,862	58.57%	+14.19
Conservative	Thomas Graham	1,317	41.43%	-
Total		3,179	100.00%	

1921 Saskatchewan general election: Swift Current
Party	Candidate	Votes	%	±%
Independent	David John Sykes	1,595	44.38%	–
Government	Roy T. Graham	1,510	42.01%	–
Labour	Allan McCallum	489	13.61%	–
Total		3,594	100.00%	

1917 Saskatchewan general election: Swift Current
Party	Candidate	Votes	%	±%
Independent	David John Sykes	Acclaimed	100.00%	
Total		Acclamation		

1912 Saskatchewan general election: Swift Current
Party	Candidate	Votes	%	±%
Liberal	Walter Scott	768	57.61%	-5.94
Conservative	Frank G. Forster	565	42.39%	+5.94
Total		1,333	100.00%	

1908 Saskatchewan general election: Swift Current
Party	Candidate	Votes	%	±%
Liberal	Walter Scott	699	63.55%	–
Provincial Rights	William Oswald Smyth	401	36.45%	–
Total		1,100	100.00%	

== See also ==
- List of Saskatchewan provincial electoral districts
- List of Saskatchewan general elections
- Canadian provincial electoral districts
