= Bernard J. McDaniel =

Canadian politician

Bernard J. McDaniel (May 26, 1886 – April 2, 1947) was a lawyer and political figure in Saskatchewan. He represented Regina City from 1938 to 1944 in the Legislative Assembly of Saskatchewan as a Liberal.

He was born in Margaree, Nova Scotia, the son of Peter McDaniel and Anne Oodey, and was educated at St. Francis Xavier University. In 1917, McDaniel married Beatrice Marshall. He served with the Canadian Expeditionary Force during World War I. McDaniel was a Grand Knight in the Knights of Columbus. He was first elected to the Saskatchewan assembly in a 1938 by-election held after Percy McCuaig Anderson was named a judge. McDaniel was defeated when he ran for reelection in 1944.
