= David John Sykes =

Canadian politician

David John Sykes (October 10, 1865 – 1941) was a farmer and political figure in Saskatchewan. He represented Swift Current in the Legislative Assembly of Saskatchewan from 1917 to 1929 as an independent and then Liberal member.

He was born in Carleton County, Ontario, the son of Thomas Sykes and Nancy Hawkins, and was educated in Carleton County, in Pembroke and in Chicago. In 1888, Sykes married Esther McGenegal. He was ordained a Presbyterian minister in the United States. Sykes came to Saskatchewan in 1904. He lived in Swift Current. Sykes was defeated by William Wensley Smith when he ran for reelection to the provincial assembly in 1929.
