= Everett Hindley =

Canadian politician

The Honourable Everett Hindley ECS MLA

Member of the Saskatchewan Legislative Assembly for Swift Current
- Incumbent
- Assumed office March 1, 2018
- Preceded by: Brad Wall

Personal details
- Party: Saskatchewan Party

Everett Hindley is a Canadian politician, who was elected to the Legislative Assembly of Saskatchewan in a by-election on March 1, 2018. He represents the electoral district of Swift Current as a member of the Saskatchewan Party.

Hindley grew up on a farm near Melfort, Saskatchewan, as the oldest of four children. He graduated from the Western Academy Broadcasting College in Saskatoon. He was the morning news announcer and news director for the local radio stations for three and a half years and the colour commentator for the Swift Current Broncos hockey broadcasts.

In 1999, he began working as the constituency assistant of then-MLA Brad Wall. After Wall became the Saskatchewan premier in 2007, Hindley served as his executive assistant until Wall left the premier post in 2017.

== Cabinet positions ==
Saskatchewan provincial government of Scott Moe
Cabinet posts (4)
Predecessor	Office	Successor
Jeremy Cockrill	Minister of Education; November 7, 2024–	Incumbent
Paul Merriman	Minister of Health; August 29, 2023–November 7, 2024	Jeremy Cockrill
Warren Kaeding	Minister of Seniors and Rural and Remote Health; November 9, 2020–August 29, 2023	Tim McLeod
Portfolio established	Minister of Mental Health and Addictions; November 9, 2020–August 29, 2023	Tim McLeod
