= Regina Centre =

Former provincial electoral district in Saskatchewan, Canada

Coordinates: 50.456°N 104.619°W

Regina Centre is a former provincial electoral division in the Canadian province of Saskatchewan, created in the redistribution prior to the 1967 election out of parts of Regina West and Regina North. It was abolished prior to the 2003 general election and is now part of Regina Elphinstone-Centre. It was the riding of Premier Allan Blakeney.

== 1967 provincial election: Regina Centre ==
General Election, October 11, 1967
Party	Candidate	Popular Vote	%
New Democratic Party	Yes X Allan Blakeney	4,363	57.1%
Liberal	Pat McKerral	2,442	31.9%
Progressive Conservative	Les Youngson	698	9.1%
Social Credit	Nelson Falkowsky	142	1.9%
Total		7,645	100.0%
Source: Saskatchewan Archives - Election Results by Electoral Division - Regina Centre

Yes Elected.
X Incumbent.

== 1971 provincial election: Regina Centre ==
General Election, June 23, 1971
Party	Candidate	Popular Vote	%
New Democratic Party	Yes X Allan Blakeney	9,804	69.7%
Liberal	Ben Freitag	4,252	30.3%
Total		14,056	100.0%
Source: Saskatchewan Archives - Election Results by Electoral Division - Regina Centre

Yes Elected.
X Incumbent.

== 1975 provincial election: Regina Centre ==
General Election, June 11, 1975
Party	Candidate	Popular Vote	%
New Democratic Party	Yes Ned Shillington	3,603	47.3%
Liberal	Les Hammond	2,417	31.7%
Progressive Conservative	Keith Jeal	1,500	19.7%
Independent	William C. Beeching	98	1.3%
Total		7,618	100.0%
Source: Saskatchewan Archives - Election Results by Electoral Division - Regina Centre

Yes Elected.
X Incumbent.

== See also ==
- List of Saskatchewan provincial electoral districts
- List of Saskatchewan general elections
- Canadian provincial electoral districts
