= Charles Cromwell Williams =

Canadian politician

Member of the Legislative Assembly of Saskatchewan from Regina City
- In office 1944–1964

Mayor of Regina
- In office 1942–1944

Personal details
- Born: February 9, 1896 Moosomin, Saskatchewan, Canada
- Died: January 31, 1975 (aged 78) Vancouver, British Columbia, Canada
- Party: Co-operative Commonwealth Federation
- Education: Brandon College

Charles Cromwell Williams (February 9, 1896 – January 31, 1975) was a railway worker and political figure in Saskatchewan, Canada. He represented Regina City in the Legislative Assembly of Saskatchewan as a Co-operative Commonwealth Federation (CCF) member from 1944 to 1964.

Williams was born in Moosomin, Saskatchewan and was educated in Wapella and at Brandon College. He was hired as a telegraph operator in Manitoba for the Canadian Pacific Railway. He was wounded while serving in the Canadian Army during World War I. On his return, he worked as a station agent for the Grand Trunk Railway in the Canadian prairies, moving to Regina in 1931. He was elected to city council in 1937 and defeated in 1939.

Williams ran unsuccessfully for a seat in the provincial assembly in a 1938 by-election. He was an unsuccessful candidate for mayor of Regina in 1940 and then served as mayor from 1942 to 1944. He was Minister of Labour in the province's Executive Council and a city councilor from 1965 to 1973. He died during a vacation in Vancouver at the age of 78.
