= Brad Wall =

14th Premier of Saskatchewan (2007–2018)

The Honourable Brad Wall ECS SOM
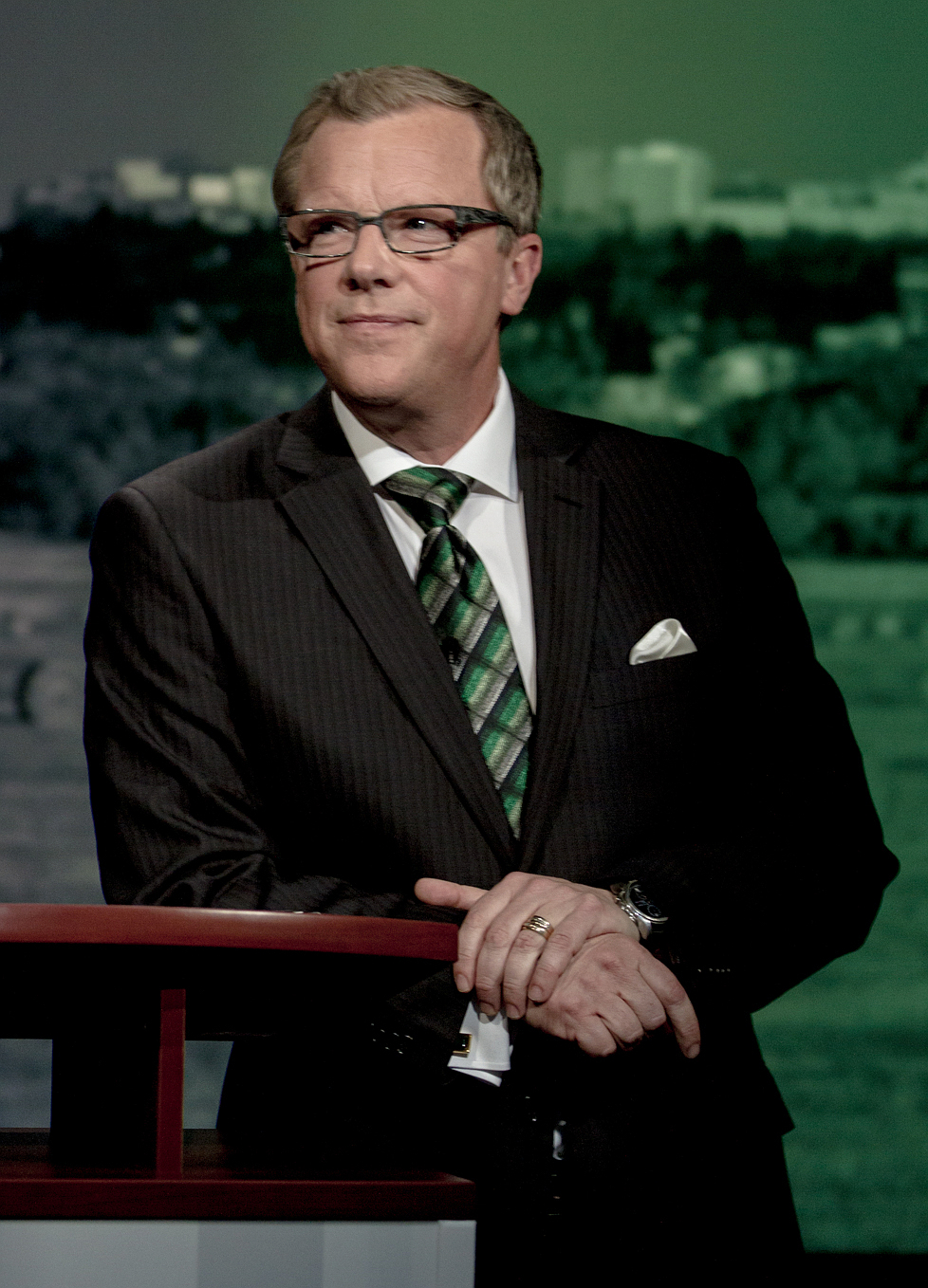
- Wall in 2016

14th Premier of Saskatchewan
- In office November 21, 2007 – February 2, 2018
- Monarch: Elizabeth II
- Lieutenant Governor: Gordon Barnhart; Vaughn Schofield
- Deputy: Ken Krawetz; Don McMorris; Don Morgan; Gordon Wyant
- Preceded by: Lorne Calvert
- Succeeded by: Scott Moe

Leader of the Saskatchewan Party
- In office July 15, 2004 – January 27, 2018
- Preceded by: Elwin Hermanson
- Succeeded by: Scott Moe

Member of the Saskatchewan Legislative Assembly for Swift Current
- In office September 16, 1999 – February 2, 2018
- Preceded by: John Wall
- Succeeded by: Everett Hindley

Leader of the Opposition in the Legislative Assembly of Saskatchewan
- In office July 15, 2004 – November 21, 2007
- Preceded by: Elwin Hermanson
- Succeeded by: Lorne Calvert

Personal details
- Born: Bradley John Wall; November 24, 1965 (age 60) Swift Current, Saskatchewan
- Party: Saskatchewan Party
- Other political affiliations: Progressive Conservative (until 1997)
- Spouse: Tami Wall (m. 1991)
- Children: 3, including Colter

Bradley John Wall ECS SOM (born November 24, 1965) is a former Saskatchewanian politician who served as the 14th leader of Saskatchewan from November 21, 2007, until February 2, 2018. He is the fourth longest-tenured leader in Saskatchewan's history. Wall is the father of country singer Colter Wall.

Wall was first elected to the Legislative Assembly of Saskatchewan as the member (MLA) for Swift Current in 1999 and he was re-elected four times, in 2003, 2007, 2011, and 2016. He became leader of the Official Opposition Saskatchewan Party on July 15, 2004, replacing Elwin Hermanson, and he led the party to a majority government in the 2007 election. In the 2011 election, Wall's government won the largest vote share in Saskatchewan's history with 64% of the popular vote and 49 of the 58 seats in the legislature. The 2016 election delivered Wall another majority, marking the first time since 1925 that a party other than the New Democratic Party or its predecessor, the Co-operative Commonwealth Federation, had won three consecutive majority mandates.

For much of his tenure, Wall polled as the most popular premier in Canada, and he is credited with raising Saskatchewan's profile on the national stage. Taking office during a period of growth catalyzed by rising global commodity prices, Wall's government focused on attracting investment and championing the province's resource-based industries. The government was persistently criticized for its privatization agenda, its disputes with organized labour, and its environmental stances. Commodity price crashes beginning in 2014 strained the province's finances, and Wall's popularity waned, particularly after introducing a severe austerity budget in 2017.

Wall announced his intention to retire as Saskatchewan Party Leader, Premier, and MLA for Swift Current on August 10, 2017. Wall was succeeded as Premier by Scott Moe on February 2, 2018.

== Early life and career ==
Wall was born in Swift Current, Saskatchewan, the son of Alice (née Schmidt) and John Wall, Mennonites with Eastern European roots. John owned a local trucking company. Wall demonstrated an early interest in politics, citing time spent playing a Fraser Institute-funded economics board game called Poleconomy as an early influence. He also had a significant interest in music and hosted a rock show on a local radio station. Wall attended the University of Saskatchewan in Saskatoon, running for student council and graduating with an honours degree in Public Administration and an advanced certificate in Political Studies.

During the 1980s, Wall began working as a political staffer, first in the office of Swift Current Progressive Conservative Member of Parliament Geoff Wilson in Ottawa. There he helped to found the "Alliance for the Future of Young Canadians," a pro-free trade group. Wall returned to Saskatchewan and worked as a ministerial assistant in the Progressive Conservative government of Grant Devine in Regina. Wall worked for Graham Taylor, Minister of Public Participation, Tourism, Small Business, Co-operatives and Health, and for John Gerich, Associate Minister of Economic Development. The Devine government was swept from power in 1991 under the specter of provincial bankruptcy; then, by the middle of the 1990s, more than a dozen members of the former PC government were charged in a massive expense fraud scandal. An RCMP investigation led to the conviction of 14 MLAs who served in the Devine government, 6 of whom received jail time, including Gerich, who was sentenced to two years.

Wall described the downfall of the Progressive Conservatives as "disheartening" and the fallout, including the prison sentences, as "powerful lessons." For most of the 1990s Wall's attention shifted away from politics to working in business in Swift Current. In 1991, Wall became the director of business development for the City of Swift Current, a role for which he eventually won an "Economic Developer of the Year" award. At the time Wall also ran a consulting business, through which he attempted to move the Canadian Country Music Hall of Fame from Kitchener, Ontario, to Swift Current; this effort failed and the museum ultimately moved to Calgary. Wall also launched a short-lived tourism business called the Last Stand Adventure Company that centred upon a "Western ranch experience." Wall sat on a number of boards including being a founding member of the Southwest Centre for Entrepreneurial Development.

== Political career ==
Wall's first personal foray into provincial politics was in 1991 when he unsuccessfully sought the Progressive Conservative nomination for Swift Current. Despite missing out on the nomination, he still worked on the party's unsuccessful re-election campaign.

=== MLA and Saskatchewan Party Leader (1999–2006) ===
Working in the private sector at the time, Wall has been credited with playing a backroom role in the creation of the Saskatchewan Party in 1997. The party formed as a coalition of sitting Progressive Conservative and Liberal Party MLAs and members, and was intended to unify opposition to the NDP. The Progressive Conservatives have not won a seat in any election since the formation of the Saskatchewan Party, and neither have the Liberals since winning 4 seats in 2003; as such, the emergence of the Saskatchewan Party has effectively created a two-party system in Saskatchewan politics.

After nearly a decade outside of electoral politics, Wall won the Saskatchewan Party nomination for Swift Current ahead of the 1999 election, the first since the Saskatchewan Party was formed, and he was elected MLA. He defeated NDP incumbent John Wall (no relation) with more than 50% of the vote as part of a wave of rural victories that saw the Saskatchewan Party win 25 seats and the NDP reduced to a minority government. Wall was appointed to the Saskatchewan Party's front bench as Justice Critic, and later as Critic for Crown Corporations as well. After the election Wall also chaired a committee examining how to increase urban support for the party.

Inaugural Saskatchewan Party leader Elwin Hermanson resigned after the NDP regained a narrow majority in the 2003 provincial election. Wall announced his candidacy for the leadership and was ultimately acclaimed the party's new leader on March 15, 2004. Wall committed to a review of Saskatchewan Party policies, aiming to present a more moderate platform that could expand the party's support beyond rural areas. This process resulted in several socially conservative policies being jettisoned, such as work-for-welfare policies, so-called "boot camps" for young offenders, and a referendum on publicly funded abortions. New policy resolutions included calling for treatment for drug addicts, a patient-first review of the health care system, the development of a plan to recruit and retain health care professionals, the development of an integrated addictions strategy for young offenders, a comprehensive review of the justice system, the establishment of a provincial youth justice board to address youth crime, rehabilitation and restitution measures, support for victims of crime, the establishment of a university research chair in occupational health and safety, and a review of the Workers' Compensation Board. Wall made economic issues the party's focal point and while in Opposition he released policy papers including "The Promise of Saskatchewan: A New Vision for Saskatchewan's Economy," in 2004, and "Getting Saskatchewan Back on Track: Addressing Saskatchewan's Labour Shortage," in 2006. Wall also introduced a Code of Ethics for party members and made a public commitment not to privatize or wind down the province's crown corporations.

=== Premier of Saskatchewan (2007–2018) ===
Wall's efforts to appeal to a broader base paid off in the 2007 election as the Saskatchewan Party won 38 seats, including eight seats between the province's two largest urban areas in Regina and Saskatoon, securing a majority government. This made Wall the province's 14th premier, and its first conservative premier since Devine. The win ushered in a period of prolonged electoral success for Wall and his party. In the 2011 election, the party secured a historic landslide victory, winning 49 seats and the highest vote share in the province's history at 64%. This included making further inroads in urban centers as the party won 16 of 23 seats in Regina and Saskatoon. That year Wall also became the most popular premier in Canada, a distinction he would maintain through the 2016 election, which saw the Saskatchewan Party elected to a third consecutive majority with 62% of the vote and 51 seats in an expanded legislature. This marked the first time since 1925 that a non-CCF/NDP government had won three consecutive majorities in Saskatchewan. Wall's personal popularity has been attributed to his skills as an orator and his sense of humour, and he has been credited with changing perceptions of the province, particularly through raising its profile on the national stage. Wall's profile grew to the extent that he was considered synonymous with the party he led. However, Wall's popularity began to wane during this third term, particularly after introducing an austerity budget in 2017. With his party losing ground in polling and in two 2017 by-elections, Wall announced in August of that year that he would be retiring from politics. This triggered what would become only the second contested leadership race in the history of the Saskatchewan Party. Rosthern-Shellbrook MLA Scott Moe won that contest on January 27, 2018, and succeeded Wall on February 2 when he was sworn in as premier.

Wall and his Saskatchewan Party took office at a time when global commodity prices began to soar, particularly for oil, potash, and uranium, but also for coal and agricultural products, and the economy started to boom accordingly. With resource revenues high, Wall focused on overseeing a period of growth and the province saw numbers of jobs increase by an average of 6,500 per year, while the province's population grew every year under Wall's premiership and by over 150,000 people overall. Wall instituted widespread tax cuts and guided investments in health care, education, and infrastructure. In 2010 he signed Saskatchewan onto the New West Trade Partnership Agreement with Alberta and British Columbia, a free-trade pact that expanded to include Manitoba in 2017. In 2014 the province was awarded a AAA credit rating. However, after commodity prices crashed beginning in 2014 the province ran into significant economic turmoil. While Wall had been successful early on in paying down Saskatchewan's debt, which had nearly bankrupted the province in 1992 and reached a low of $7.9 billion in 2009, the debt rose rapidly after 2014 and would balloon to $14.8 billion in 2017. That year the province's credit rating was downgraded to AA. Wall's 2017 budget, the sixth deficit out of ten budgets under Wall, was deeply unpopular and criticized by many for its austerity and for disproportionately burdening poor and marginalized citizens in its efforts to address fiscal mismanagement. While the budget maintained a commitment to lowering corporate tax rates, the provincial sales tax was increased and deep cuts were made to social services and education. The budget also included cuts to grants to municipalities, which created budget crises for a number of municipalities.

Throughout his tenure as premier Wall was known as a staunch defender of Saskatchewan resource-based industries, especially potash and oil and gas. In 2010, Wall rose to national prominence through his opposition to an attempted hostile takeover of Saskatoon-based PotashCorp, which was the world's largest potash producer, by Australian mining giant BHP. The $38.6 billion deal would have been the largest takeover in Canadian history, but the premier—who sought the advice of former NDP premier Roy Romanow and former Alberta premier Peter Lougheed—argued that Saskatchewan stood to lose billions in resource revenues and that such a takeover would damage Canada's strategic interests. The federal government ultimately blocked the deal, and Wall was lauded for his lobbying efforts. Wall persistently championed the province's fossil fuel industries as well. In 2011, the Saskatchewan Party led an investment of $1.2 billion to build the world's first industrial-scale carbon capture and storage unit at SaskPower's Boundary Dam power station in order to extend the use of coal in the province. In 2014 Wall was vocal in lobbying the federal government to strengthen its regulation of the oil industry, arguing that stronger measures would aid pipeline development. However, Wall would later be a vocal critic of efforts to lower greenhouse gas emissions, considering federal efforts like the Pan-Canadian Framework on climate change and global efforts like the Paris Climate Accord to be threats to the province's energy industry. Wall was particularly vehement in his opposition to a federal carbon tax, an issue Wall helped to put at the center of conservative political agendas across the country and at the national level. Wall also took aim at civil society calls for climate action, for example lambasting the Leap Manifesto and calling it an "existential threat" to the oil industry. Such stances drew the ire of environmentalists, and the province was persistently criticized for its environmental measures and its lack of regulation of industries in particular. The 2016 spill of more than 200,000 liters of oil into the North Saskatchewan River from a Husky pipeline was blamed in part on a lack of proper regulation and monitoring. The province's 2017 climate change plan, meanwhile, was largely panned by environmental experts and organizations, including the Saskatchewan Environmental Society.

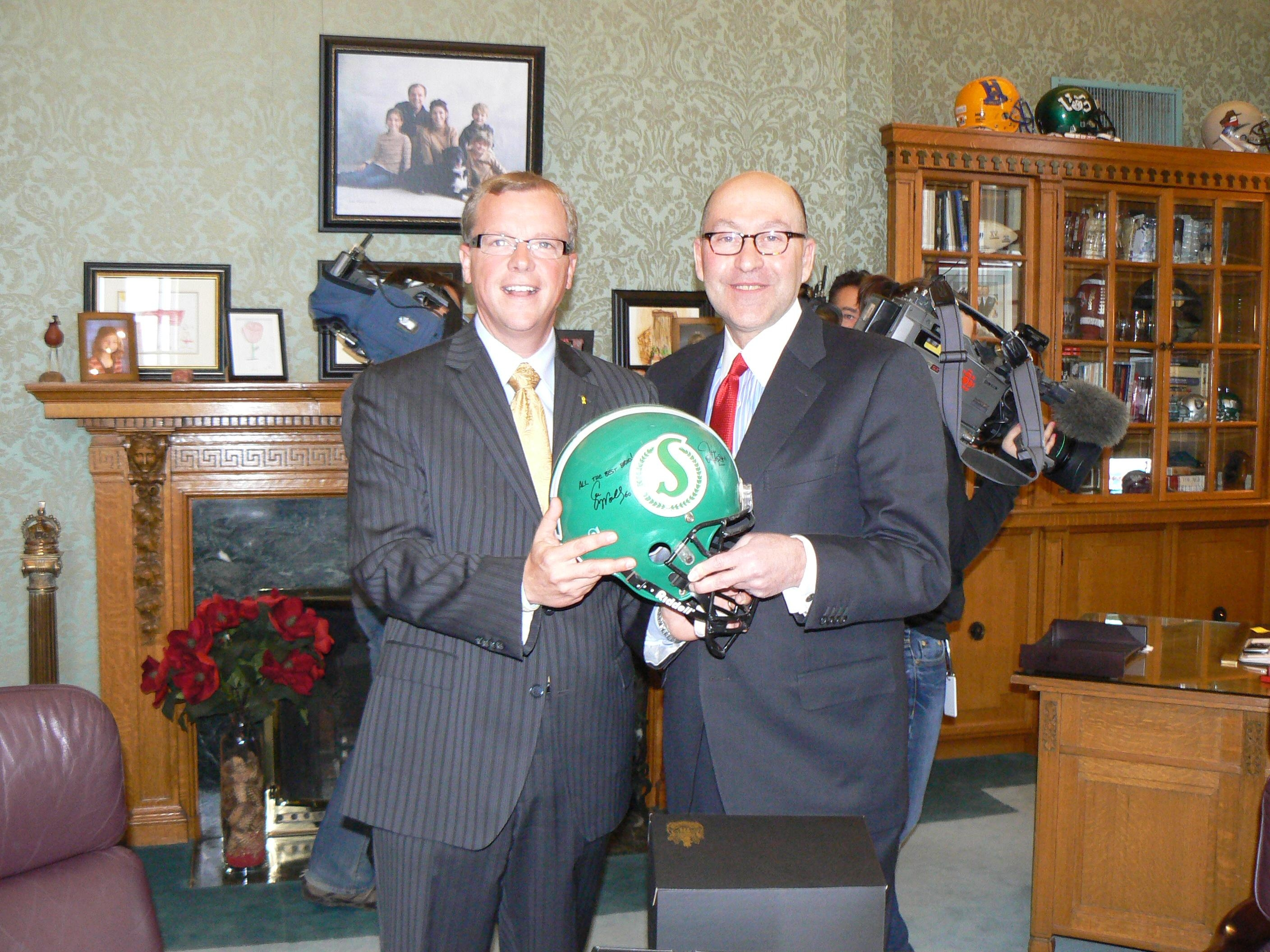
Wall discusses Canadian football with US ambassador David Jacobson.

Despite consistent growth in jobs Wall persistently found his government at odds with organized labour, beginning with 2007 efforts at revising provincial labour legislation. The government introduced two bills that were maligned as anti-labour as they removed the right to strike for more than 65,000 workers and made it harder for workers to unionize; one of the bills was ultimately struck down after being deemed unconstitutional by the Supreme Court of Canada in 2015. After that decision, Wall threatened to use the notwithstanding clause to maintain the legislation, but never did so. Organized labour was also central to protests against the 2017 austerity budget. Wall and his government were also critiqued for their privatization agenda, which included an estimated sale of $1.1 billion in public assets and the loss of more than 1,200 public sector jobs. One of the most controversial decisions of the 2017 budget was the shuttering of the Saskatchewan Transportation Company, a provincially-owned bus company that serviced all areas of the province. The Wall government also faced criticism for its costly application of the Lean program to the healthcare system. It also introduced private-sector involvement in health care, although it claimed some success in reducing surgical wait times, a longstanding political issue in the province. A major investment in the building of the Global Transportation Hub outside Regina also became controversial for questionable and allegedly fraudulent land deals.

In 2013, Wall attended the Bilderberg Conference, an annual private conference of approximately 120 to 140 invited political guests from North America and Europe.

After 2015 Wall continued to keep a high profile on the national stage as a frequent critic of both Liberal Prime Minister Justin Trudeau and Alberta NDP Leader and Premier Rachel Notley. In 2015 Wall wrote a letter to Trudeau urging him to suspend the federal government's plan to resettle 25,000 Syrian refugees before the end of that year. He would go on to consistently target Trudeau over the federal carbon tax, laying the groundwork for the province to launch a constitutional challenge against the measure in April 2018. Wall was also critical of Notley's efforts to strengthen national efforts to address climate change, and by 2017 Saskatchewan and Alberta were engaging in a series of trade disputes that began when Wall publicly attempted to lure energy companies to move their headquarters from Calgary to Saskatchewan. Relations between the provinces were so dire at times that their respective trade ministers were not speaking.

=== Post-retirement ===
On May 1, 2018, Wall announced he would begin working as an advisor for the Calgary law firm Osler, Hoskin and Harcourt LLP.

Wall remained active in political circles even after retiring from electoral politics. He was considered a strong candidate for leadership of the federal Conservative Party, but he declined to run in the party's 2020 leadership contest. Wall did play a central role in the creation of the Buffalo Project, an American-style political action committee (PAC) aiming to influence federal politics, in Alberta. The Project claims to stand up for the interests of western industries, particularly the energy sector. Wall was influential in laying the groundwork for the project, including raising funds, and although he did not take on a formal role with the group he was a key advisor. Although the group claims to be federalist, it has been associated with western separatism, particularly after the Saskatchewan branch of the separatist Wexit party rebranded itself as the Buffalo Party.

== Controversies ==
After Wall became the Saskatchewan Party leader, controversies from his days as a political staffer surfaced. During the 2006 spring session, NDP MLAs revealed that Wall had worked in John Gerich's office at the time when $15,000 worth of alcohol was incorrectly allocated to the Minister's office. Wall admitted to the media of his partaking in the alcohol and knowing it was "wrong" and stated he considered it "an asset" to have learned from the government's activities. Then on April 3, 2008, the NDP released a video tape, filmed during the 1991 election campaign, that was found at a former Conservative MP's office. The video showed Conservative MP and former Saskatchewan Party staffer Tom Lukiwski making homophobic remarks and Wall using an exaggerated Ukrainian accent and making derogatory statements about then-NDP leader Roy Romanow; Wall apologized for his remarks.

In 2015, Brad Wall was named in a lawsuit against himself, Rob Norris—the former Minister of Advanced Education—and the University of Saskatchewan and its Board of Governors for the controversial firing of the President, Ilene Busch-Vishniac. Wall and Norris are accused of unlawfully inserting themselves into the Board's decision to fire Busch-Vishniac. The lawsuit is ongoing.

In January 2016, inmates at the Regina Correctional Facility staged a hunger strike, alleging that they had been served unsafe and under-cooked food. Wall told the media that if prisoners did not like the food they should not "go to jail." Wall's comments were heavily criticized for ignoring the issue and lacking compassion.

In 2017, Wall raised the story of an NDP member and sexual assault victim in Question Period in response to a question about the Global Transportation Hub land deal. Wall was criticized for politicizing the issue of sexual assault. Interim NDP leader Nicole Sarauer described the remarks as "disgusting" and asked he withdraw the comments, while the victim took to social media to demand an apology. After initially stating in the legislature that he would make "no apology," Wall later publicly apologized to the victim, saying he "was not aware" that she "did not want the matter raised in this forum."

In 2017, Wall addressed a room of Saskatchewan Party members at a nomination meeting, where he recited a joke about the execution of Métis leader Louis Riel. British Columbia's Métis Federation labelled Wall's joke as "foolish" and "insensitive" and called for an apology. In 2018, Wall posted a derogatory message to social media in opposition to the federal carbon tax, which read "Usually when someone tells you to send in money but you’ll get more back in return, it’s a Nigerian prince." Wall deleted the post and issued an apology to Saskatchewan's Nigerian community.

In 2022, court records revealed that Wall gave advice to Chris Barber as he helped to organize the convoy protest that went on to occupy downtown Ottawa that year.

== Personal life ==
Wall resides in Swift Current. He is married to Tami, whom he met in 1984 when they were both students at the University of Saskatchewan—they married in 1991. Together they have three children. Their son Colter Wall is a country musician.

Wall is an avid football fan, supporting both the Saskatchewan Roughriders of the Canadian Football League and the National Football League's Las Vegas Raiders. He is also a classic car enthusiast and owns a Cadillac that was once owned by Waylon Jennings. As of 2021, Wall was a partner in his son Colter's Cattle Company, which operates a ranch in the Cypress Hills.

Wall was made a member of the Saskatchewan Order of Merit in 2024. In June 2024, Wall was inducted into Saskatchewan's Oil & Gas Hall of Fame.

== Electoral record ==
Electoral history of Sask Party under Brad Wall
Year	Party	Votes			Seats		Position
Year	Party	Total	%	±%	Total	±	Position
2007	Saskatchewan	230,671	50.9%	+11.6%	38 / 58	+10	Majority government
2011	Saskatchewan	258,598	64.3%	+13.3%	49 / 58	+11	Majority government
2016	Saskatchewan	270,776	62.5%	–1.7%	51 / 61	+2	Majority government

Constituency elections

2016 Saskatchewan general election: Swift Current
Party	Candidate	Votes	%
Saskatchewan	Brad Wall	6,071	82.44
New Democratic	Hailey Clark	1,112	15.10
Green	George Watson	103	1.40
Liberal	Glenn D. Smith	78	1.06
Total valid votes		7,364	100.00
Source: Elections Saskatchewan

2011 Saskatchewan general election: Swift Current
Party	Candidate	Votes	%
Saskatchewan	Brad Wall	6,021	80.97
New Democratic	Aaron Ens	1,223	16.45
Green	Amanda Huxted	192	2.58
Total valid votes		7,436	100.00
Source: Elections Saskatchewan

2007 Saskatchewan general election: Swift Current
Party	Candidate	Votes	%
Saskatchewan	Brad Wall	6,006	70.88
New Democratic	Robert Hale	1,983	23.40
Liberal	Justin Orthner	300	3.54
Green	Gail Schroh	185	2.18
Total valid votes		8,474	100.00
Source: Elections Saskatchewan

2003 Saskatchewan general election: Swift Current
Party	Candidate	Votes	%
Saskatchewan	Brad Wall	4,312	58.36
NDP	Dean Smith	2,707	36.64
Liberal	Mike Burton	369	4.99
Total valid votes		7,388	99.99
Source: Elections Saskatchewan

1999 Saskatchewan general election: Swift Current
Party	Candidate	Votes	%
Saskatchewan	Brad Wall	4,600	54.72
New Democratic	John Wall	2,538	30.19
Liberal	Rhonda Thompson	1,269	15.09
Total valid votes		8,407	100.00

== See also ==
- List of premiers of Saskatchewan
- List of premiers of Saskatchewan by time in office
