= Clarence Fines =

Canadian politician, teacher and union leader

Clarence Melvin Fines (August 16, 1905 – October 27, 1993) was a Canadian politician, teacher and union leader. He was provincial treasurer of the province of Saskatchewan during the Tommy Douglas era, and also served as Deputy Premier.

Born in Darlington, Manitoba, Fines was educated at both the University of Saskatchewan and the University of Manitoba and received a BA. He became a teacher and principal in Regina, and would later serve three years as the President of the Regina Teachers' Association. He then served two years as the President of the Regina Branch of the Saskatchewan Teachers' Federation.

While serving as an assistant principal at the same school as Major James Coldwell, Fines became involved with the Independent Labour Party (ILP), which Coldwell headed. In 1931, Fines was elected president of the ILP, at the Western Conference of Labour Political Parties. He strived to merge the farmer and the labour political movements under one party. In July 1932, he succeeded in merging the two movements into the Saskatchewan Farmer-Labour Party. In August, he helped organize the founding meeting of the Co-operative Commonwealth Federation (CCF) in Calgary.

Fines served as a Regina City Councillor from 1934 to 1939 and from 1942 to 1944. During this time he was the chair of the Regina General Hospital, director of the Regina Exhibition Board, and a member of the parks board.

Fines was first elected to the Legislative Assembly of Saskatchewan in the June 15, 1944 Saskatchewan general election that saw the CCF sweep the province, becoming Canada's first Social Democratic government. He represented the Regina City constituency continuously from 1944 to 1960.

Fines had a tremendous influence over the reforms made by the CCF government over the following years. As treasurer, Fines made sure that these reforms were made while producing balanced budgets. In 1944, Saskatchewan had a debt of $218 million, 38% of Saskatchewan's GDP. With successive balanced budgets, Fines brought this number down to $70 million by 1949. In 1953, Saskatchewan was debtless. For the next 16 years, all of Fines' budgets had surpluses. During his tenure as an MLA, Fines also served as the minister responsible for the Bureau of Publications, Queen's Printer Office, Government Purchasing Agency, the Liquor Board, and Saskatchewan Government Insurance.

In 1960, he retired and became a corporate financial advisor, eventually going to Grenada. In 1963 he moved to Fort Lauderdale, Florida where he lived the rest of his life. When he died there on October 27, 1993, he was the last surviving member of Douglas's first cabinet. In 2006, Fines appeared as a prominent character in the Canadian Broadcasting Corporation's docu-drama mini-series Prairie Giant: The Tommy Douglas Story, and was portrayed by Canadian actor Don McKellar.

The C.M. Fines Building is named in his honour.

== Bibliography ==
- Johnson, Albert Wesley; Rosemary Proctor (2004). Dream no little dreams: a biography of the Douglas Government of Saskatchewan, 1944-1961. Toronto: University of Toronto Press. ISBN 978-0-8020-8633-4.
- McLeod, Thomas; Ian McLeod (2004). The Road to Jerusalem (2 ed.). Calgary: Fifth House. ISBN 1-894856-48-1.
- Shackleton, Doris French (1975). Tommy Douglas. Toronto: McClelland & Stewart. ISBN 0-7710-8116-2.
- Stewart, Walter (2000). M.J.: The Life and times of M.J. Coldwell. Toronto, Ontario: Stoddart Publishing Co. Ltd. ISBN 0-7737-3232-2.
- Stewart, Walter (2003). Tommy: the life and politics of Tommy Douglas. Toronto: McArthur & Company. ISBN 1-55278-382-0.
- Young, Walter D. (1969). The anatomy of a party: the national CCF 1932–61. Toronto: University of Toronto Press. ISBN 0-8020-5221-5.
