= Thunder Creek (1912–1938 electoral district) =

Former provincial electoral district in Saskatchewan, Canada

Coordinates: 50°35′N 106°10′W

Thunder Creek is a former provincial electoral district for the Legislative Assembly of the province of Saskatchewan, Canada. This district was created before the 3rd Saskatchewan general election in 1912. The constituency was dissolved and combined with the Arm River, Morse, and Lumsden districts before the 9th Saskatchewan general election in 1938.

This district was revived for the 18th Saskatchewan general election in 1975.

== Members of the Legislative Assembly ==
#	MLA	Served	Party
1.	Alexandre Beaudreau	1912 – 1917	Liberal
2.	Andrew Dunn Gallaugher	1917 – 1921	Conservative
3.	William J. Finley Warren	1921 – 1925	Progressive
4.	Robert Scott Donaldson	1925 – 1929	Liberal
5.	Harold Alexander Lilly	1929 – 1934	Conservative
6.	Robert Scott Donaldson	1934 – 1938	Liberal

== Election results ==
1912 Saskatchewan general election: Thunder Creek electoral district
Party	Candidate	Votes	%	±%
Liberal	Alexandre Beaudreau	1,244	55.07%	–
Conservative	Andrew Dunn Gallaugher	1,015	44.93%	–
Total		2,259	100.00%	

1917 Saskatchewan general election: Thunder Creek electoral district
Party	Candidate	Votes	%	±%
Conservative	Andrew Dunn Gallaugher	2,165	45.72%	+0.79
Liberal	Alexander Beaudreau	1,959	41.37%	-13.70
Nonpartisan League	Zoa Haight	611	12.91%	–
Total		4,735	100.00%	

1921 Saskatchewan general election: Thunder Creek electoral district
Party	Candidate	Votes	%	±%
Progressive	William J. Finley Warren	730	51.48%	-
Conservative	Andrew Dunn Gallaugher	688	48.52%	+2.80
Total		1,418	100.00%	

1925 Saskatchewan general election: Thunder Creek electoral district
Party	Candidate	Votes	%	±%
Liberal	Robert Scott Donaldson	905	38.14%	-
Conservative	John A. Stinson	753	31.73%	-16.79
Progressive	William J. Finley Warren	715	30.13%	-21.35
Total		2,373	100.00%	

1929 Saskatchewan general election: Thunder Creek electoral district
Party	Candidate	Votes	%	±%
Conservative	Harold Alexander Lilly	1,892	61.73%	+30.00
Liberal	Robert Scott Donaldson	1,173	38.27%	+0.13
Total		3,065	100.00%	

1934 Saskatchewan general election: Thunder Creek electoral district
Party	Candidate	Votes	%	±%
Liberal	Robert Scott Donaldson	1,608	40.13%	+1.86
Conservative	Harold Alexander Lilly	1,396	34.84%	-26.89
Farmer-Labour	C. A. Stuart	1,003	25.03%	–
Total		4,007	100.00%	

== See also ==
- List of Saskatchewan provincial electoral districts
- List of Saskatchewan general elections
- Canadian provincial electoral districts
- Thunder Creek
