= Regina City (provincial electoral district) =

Former provincial electoral district in Saskatchewan, Canada

Coordinates: 50.434°N 104.604°W

Regina City is a former provincial electoral division in the Canadian province of Saskatchewan that was in use from 1905 to 1964.

Regina City elected a single MLA 1905 to 1917. It elected two members 1921 to 1948, three members in 1952 and 1956, and four members in 1960. In each election where Regina elected multiple MLAs, each voter could cast as many votes as there were seats to be filled (block voting).

Its MLA 1916–1922 was Premier William Melville Martin.

The district of Regina City existed from 1905 to 1964 when it was divided into:

- Regina East (2 members)
- Regina North
- Regina South
- Regina West (2 members)

== MLAs ==
1. James Franklin Bole, Liberal (1905–1916)
2. William Melville Martin, Liberal (1916–1922)
3. James Albert Cross, Liberal (1921–1925)
4. Donald Alexander McNiven, Liberal (1922–1929)
5. M. A. MacPherson, Conservative (1925–1934)
6. James Grassick, Conservative (1929–1934)
7. Percy McCuaig Anderson, Liberal (1934–1944)
8. William Franklin Kerr, Liberal (1934–1938)
9. Bamm David Hogarth, Liberal (1938)
10. Bernard J. McDaniel, Liberal (1938–1944)
11. Charles Cromwell Williams, CCF (1944–1964)
12. Clarence Melvin Fines, CCF (1944–1960)
13. Marjorie Alexandra Cooper, CCF (1952–1964)
14. Allan Emrys Blakeney, CCF (1960–1964)
15. Edward Charles Whelan, CCF (1960–1964)

== Election results ==
1960 Saskatchewan general election
Party	Candidate	Votes	%	Elected
Co-operative Commonwealth	Charles Cromwell Williams	23,425	11.14	✓
Co-operative Commonwealth	Allan Blakeney	22,382	10.64	✓
Co-operative Commonwealth	Marjorie Alexandra Cooper	22,205	10.56	✓
Co-operative Commonwealth	Ed Whelan	21,806	10.37	✓
Liberal	Frederick William Johnson	16,662	7.92	
Liberal	Leslie Charles Sherman	16,316	7.76	
Liberal	James Gillis Collins	15,578	7.41	
Liberal	Mavis Jeanne Adams	14,589	6.94	
Progressive Conservative	John Leishman	7,944	3.78	
Social Credit	Henry Austin Hunt	7,652	3.64	
Social Credit	Bert Louis Iannone	7,206	3.43	
Progressive Conservative	M. A. MacPherson	7,194	3.42	
Social Credit	G. Lindsay Bower	7,103	3.38	
Social Credit	William G. Gemlin	7,058	3.36	
Progressive Conservative	Donald Bowman	6,358	3.02	
Progressive Conservative	Walter Schmidt	5,175	2.46	
Independent	Leslie Hibbs	698	0.33	
Independent	Herbert Kenneth Cooper	624	0.30	
Communist	William C. Beeching	345	0.16	
Total number of valid votes		210,237	100.00	
Eligible voters		63,391		
Source: Canadian Elections Database

1956 Saskatchewan general election
Party	Candidate	Votes	%	Elected
Co-operative Commonwealth	Charles Cromwell Williams	23,771	17.55	✓
Co-operative Commonwealth	Marjorie Alexandra Cooper	23,389	16.53	✓
Co-operative Commonwealth	Clarence Melvin Fines	21,658	15.99	✓
Liberal	Leslie Charles Sherman	11,984	8.85	
Liberal	George Alexander Jupp	11,905	8.79	
Liberal	John M. Riffel	11,612	8.58	
Social Credit	Frederick William Mullin	10,629	7.85	
Social Credit	Les Hammond	10,588	7.82	
Social Credit	Henry Austin Hunt	10,455	7.72	
Labor–Progressive	Frederick Nelson Clarke	419	0.31	
Total number of valid votes		136,859	100.00	
Eligible voters		55,101		
Source: Canadian Elections Database

1952 Saskatchewan general election
Party	Candidate	Votes	%	Elected
Co-operative Commonwealth	Charles Cromwell Williams	25,774	19.97	✓
Co-operative Commonwealth	Clarence Melvin Fines	25,018	19.39	✓
Co-operative Commonwealth	Marjorie Alexandra Cooper	24,706	19.15	✓
Liberal	Garnet Nelson Menzies	16,232	12.58	
Liberal	Harry Grayson Robert Walker	15,833	12.27	
Liberal	John Cunningham Knowles	15,328	11.88	
Independent Progressive Conservative	George Alexander Jupp	1,542	1.19	
Social Credit	William C. Gamelin	1,446	1.12	
Social Credit	Nick Iannoue	1,329	1.03	
Social Credit	Anthony E. Kovatch	1,259	0.98	
Labor–Progressive	William C. Beeching	579	0.45	
Total number of valid votes		128,467	100.00	
Eligible voters		48,645		
Source: Canadian Elections Database

1948 Saskatchewan general election
Party	Candidate	Votes	%	Elected
Co-operative Commonwealth	Charles Cromwell Williams	20,475	26.84	✓
Co-operative Commonwealth	Clarence Melvin Fines	20,474	26.84	✓
Progressive Conservative	Allan Williams Embury	16,740	21.94	
Liberal	Wilfred George Brown	16,578	21.73	
Social Credit	Walter E. Stowe	1,049	1.38	
Social Credit	Anthony E. Kovatch	971	1.27	
Total number of valid votes		76,287	100.00	
Source: Canadian Elections Database

1944 Saskatchewan general election
Party	Candidate	Votes	%	Elected
Co-operative Commonwealth	Charles Cromwell Williams	14,784	25.89	✓
Co-operative Commonwealth	Clarence Melvin Fines	14,129	24.75	✓
Liberal	Charles Roberts Davidson	10,982	19.23	
Liberal	Bernard J. McDaniel	10,551	18.48	
Progressive Conservative	Hugh McGillivray	3,536	6.19	
Progressive Conservative	Claude H. J. Burrows	3,114	5.45	
Total number of valid votes		57,906	100.00	
Source: Canadian Elections Database

1938 Saskatchewan general election
Party	Candidate	Votes	%	Elected
Liberal	Percy McCuaig Anderson	12,749	22.52	✓
Liberal	Bamm David Hogarth	12,641	22.33	✓
Conservative	Hugh McGillivray	7,934	14.02	
Conservative	Frederick Bertram Bagshaw	6,576	11.62	
Independent Labor	Alban Cedric Ellison	5,329	9.41	
Labor–Progressive	Samuel Barrington East	4,426	7.82	
Labor–Progressive	Thomas Gerald McManus	4,088	7.22	
Independent Labor	Alexander Duff Connon	1,897	3.35	
Social Credit	John Harold Crawford	966	1.71	
Total number of valid votes		56,606	100.00	
Source: Canadian Elections Database

== See also ==
- List of Saskatchewan provincial electoral districts
- List of Saskatchewan general elections
- Canadian provincial electoral districts
