= Robert Scott Donaldson =

Canadian politician

Robert Scott Donaldson (1875–1944) was a Canadian politician who represented Lumsden on the Legislative Assembly of the province of Saskatchewan during the 9th sitting.

He also represented Thunder Creek from 1925 to 1929, and 1934 to 1938.

== Career ==
He defeated Harold Alexander Lilly in 1934.

== Electoral history ==
1938 Saskatchewan general election: Lumsden electoral district
Party	Candidate	Votes	%	±%
Liberal	Robert S. Donaldson	2,596	37.14%	-8.64
Conservative	Claude H.J. Burrows	1,923	27.51%	-5.89
CCF	McDirmid Rankin	1,847	26.42%	+5.60
Social Credit	Thomas Allan McInnis	624	8.93%	–
Total		6,990	100.00%	
