= Bamm David Hogarth =

Canadian politician

Bamm David Hogarth (October 24, 1887 – November 13, 1966) was a lawyer, judge and political figure in Saskatchewan. He represented Regina City from 1938 to 1944 in the Legislative Assembly of Saskatchewan as a Liberal.

He was born in Minnedosa, Manitoba, the son of George A. Hogarth, of Scottish descent, and was educated in Manitoba and Saskatchewan. Hogarth was first employed as a newspaper delivery boy for the Winnipeg Free Press. He came to Regina, Saskatchewan in 1906. Hogarth was called to the Saskatchewan bar in 1913 and practised law in Regina. He married Mabel Melrose Scott. In 1935, he was named King's Counsel. Hogarth was a lecturer at Wetmore Hall law school in Regina until it became part of the University of Saskatchewan. He represented the Canadian government and the RCMP at the Royal Commission that investigated the Regina riot of 1935. In 1944, he was named to the District Court for Regina. Hogarth retired from the bench in October 1962. He died in a Toronto hospital at the age of 79 following an operation.
