= Harold Alexander Lilly =

Canadian politician

Harold Alexander Lilly (April 3, 1885 – 1936) was a farmer, car dealer and political figure in Saskatchewan. He represented Thunder Creek in the Legislative Assembly of Saskatchewan from 1929 to 1934 as a Conservative.

He was born in Beeton, Ontario, the son of William Lilly and Eleanor Beatty, and was educated in Beeton and Owen Sound. He came to Saskatchewan in 1905. In 1910, Lilly married Olivia Johnston. He lived in Caron, Saskatchewan. Lilly was defeated by Robert Scott Donaldson when he ran for reelection to the Saskatchewan assembly in 1934. He married Margaret MacKay following the death of his first wife.

His son Alexander John Lilly was inducted into Canada's Aviation Hall of Fame in 1984.
