= Regina West (provincial electoral district) =

Former provincial electoral district in Saskatchewan, Canada

Regina West was a provincial electoral district in the Canadian Province of Saskatchewan. It was created prior to the election of 1964, when the four member Regina City constituency was broken up into two constituencies with two members each, Regina West and Regina East. Regina West was dissolved prior to the election of 1967, when multi-member constituencies were abolished.

== Election results ==
1964 Saskatchewan general election
Party	Candidate	Popular Vote	%
Co-operative Commonwealth Federation	Yes X Allan Blakeney	9,076	24.7%
Co-operative Commonwealth Federation	Yes X Marjorie Alexandra Cooper	8,413	22.9%
Liberal	Alex Cochrane	7,770	21.2%
Liberal	Betty Sear	6,981	19.0%
Progressive Conservative	Donald K. MacPherson	4,495	12.2%
Total		36,735	100.0%
Source: Saskatchewan Archives - Election Results by Electoral Division - Regina West

Yes Elected
X Incumbent

== See also ==
- List of Saskatchewan provincial electoral districts
- List of Saskatchewan general elections
- Canadian provincial electoral districts
