= Marjorie Cooper =

Canadian politician

Marjorie Alexandra Cooper
- Born: Marjorie Alexandra Lovering; May 28, 1902; Winnipeg, Manitoba
- Died: September 12, 1984 (aged 82); Regina, Saskatchewan
- Occupations: Educator, civil servant, and politician
- Spouses: Ed Cooper; Wilfred Hunt
- Parents: Henry Langston Lovering (father); Annie Jane Boselly (mother)

Marjorie Alexandra Cooper (May 28, 1902 – September 12, 1984) was an educator, civil servant, and political figure in Saskatchewan, Canada. She represented Regina City from 1952 to 1964 and Regina West from 1964 to 1967 in the Legislative Assembly of Saskatchewan as a Co-operative Commonwealth Federation (CCF) member. She was the third woman elected to the Saskatchewan assembly and the longest sitting female member of the assembly.

Born Marjorie Alexandra Lovering in Winnipeg, Manitoba, she was the daughter of Ontario-born parents Henry Langston Lovering and Annie Jane Boselly. Her family moved to Regina, Saskatchewan in 1907.

Cooper taught school in McCord from 1919 to 1925, when she married Ed Cooper. She was president of the Regina YWCA from 1941 to 1943 and president of the Regina Council of Women from 1946 to 1948. In 1945, she was named to the Saskatchewan Labour Relations Board and, in 1951, to the Saskatchewan Public Service Commission. After the death of her first husband, she married Wilfred Hunt in 1967. She died in Regina at the age of 82.
