= Patricia Anne Smith =

Canadian politician

Patricia Anne "Pat" Smith (born January 29, 1943) is a former political figure in Saskatchewan, Canada. She represented Swift Current from 1982 to 1991 in the Legislative Assembly of Saskatchewan as a Progressive Conservative.

She was born Patricia Anne Chalmers in Cabri, Saskatchewan, the daughter of Arthur W. Chalmers and Martha Shiels, and was educated in Swift Current, Saskatchewan. In 1960, she married Edward Harvey Smith. In 1980, Smith became the first female president of the Saskatchewan School Trustees Association. With her husband, she also managed Sam's General Trucking Ltd. She and Joan Duncan became the first female members of a Saskatchewan cabinet in 1982. Smith served as Minister of Social Services, as Minister of Education, as Minister of Energy and Mines, as Minister of Urban Affairs and as Minister of Culture, Multiculturalism and Recreation. She also served as deputy Premier for Saskatchewan. She resigned from cabinet for health reasons in 1990 and retired from politics the following year.

As of 2006, Smith was living in Swift Current.
