= Percy McCuaig Anderson =

Canadian politician (1879-1948)

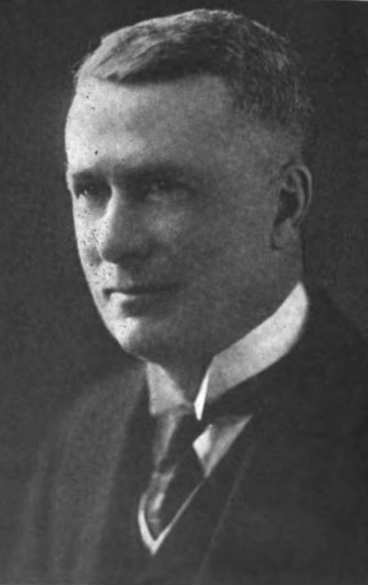

Member of the Legislative Assembly of Saskatchewan
- In office 1934–1938
- Constituency: Regina City

Personal details
- Born: January 9, 1879; Paisley, Ontario
- Died: November 19, 1948 (aged 69); Regina, Saskatchewan
- Political party: Liberal
- Spouse: Edith Leslie (m. 1911)
- Education: Queen's University
- Occupation: Jurist, politician

Percy McCuaig Anderson (January 9, 1879 – November 19, 1948) was a lawyer, judge and political figure in Saskatchewan. He represented Regina City from 1934 to 1938 in the Legislative Assembly of Saskatchewan as a Liberal.

He was born in Paisley, Ontario and was educated in Uxbridge, in Belleville and at Queen's University. He studied law in Winnipeg, Manitoba and then moved to Saskatchewan, working with a law firm in Regina. In 1911, he married Edith Leslie. Anderson was named King's Counsel in 1919. He was president of the Regina Board of Trade from 1920 to 1921. He served as chairman of the Saskatchewan war labor mobilization board during World War II. In November 1938, he resigned his seat in the assembly when he was named to the Saskatchewan Court of King's Bench. In 1946, Anderson was appointed to the Saskatchewan Court of Appeal.

He died in Regina on November 19, 1948.
