= James Gordon Taggart =

Canadian politician

James Gordon Taggart CBE (September 28, 1892 – June 11, 1974) was a civil servant, educator and political figure in Saskatchewan. He represented Swift Current from 1934 to 1944 as a Liberal.

He was born in Parrsboro, Nova Scotia and raised in River Hebert. He received his primary and junior matriculation at the local grade school in River Hebert, followed by post-secondary studies at the Nova Scotia Agricultural College and then the Ontario Agricultural College. Taggart was principal of the School of Agriculture in Vermilion, Alberta before entering the federal public service and becoming superintendent of the Swift Current Dominion Experimental Farm for the Department of Agriculture.

Taggart was elected to the Legislative Assembly of Saskatchewan under the ministry of Premier William John Patterson and served in the provincial cabinet as Minister of Agriculture. Following his tenure in provincial politics, Taggart served as Deputy Minister for the federal Department of Agriculture from 1949 to 1959. He was invested as a Commander of the Order of the British Empire. He died in Toronto. In 1976, Taggart has been named to the Saskatchewan Agricultural Hall of Fame.
