= Saskatchewan Highway 1 =

Highway in Saskatchewan, Canada

Highway 1
- Trans–Canada Highway
- Highway 1 highlighted in red

Route information
- Maintained by Ministry of Highways and Infrastructure & Transport Canada
- Length: 653.6 km (406.1 mi)

Major junctions
- West end: Highway 1 (TCH) at the Alberta border near Walsh
- Highway 21 near Maple Creek; Highway 4 in Swift Current; Highway 2 in Moose Jaw; Highway 39 near Moose Jaw; Highway 11 in Regina; Highway 6 / CanAm Highway in Regina; Highway 10 at Balgonie; Highway 35 at Qu'Appelle; Highway 9 at Whitewood; Highway 8 at Moosomin
- East end: PTH 1 (TCH) at the Manitoba border near Fleming

Location
- Country: Canada
- Province: Saskatchewan
- Rural municipalities: Maple Creek No. 111, Piapot No. 110, Gull Lake No. 139, Webb No. 138, Swift Current No. 138, Excelsior No. 166, Morse No. 165, Chaplin No. 164, Wheatlands No. 163, Caron No. 162, Moose Jaw Mo. 161, Pense No. 160, Sherwood No. 159, Edenwold No. 158, South Qu'appelle No. 157, Indian Head No. 156, Wolseley No. 155, Elcapo No. 154, Willowdale No. 153, Silverwood No. 123, Martin No. 122, Moosomin No. 121
- Major cities: Regina, Moose Jaw, Swift Current

Highway system
- Provincial highways in Saskatchewan
← Highway 999	→ Highway 2

Highway 1 is Saskatchewan's section of the Trans-Canada Highway mainland route. The total distance of the Trans-Canada Highway in Saskatchewan is 654 kilometres (406 mi). The highway traverses Saskatchewan from the western border with Alberta, west of Swift Current, to the Manitoba border east of Moosomin, Saskatchewan, where the highway continues as Manitoba Highway 1 to Winnipeg. The Trans-Canada Highway Act was passed on December 10, 1949. The Saskatchewan segment was completed August 21, 1957, and completely twinned on November 6, 2008. The speed limit along the majority of the route is 110 kilometres per hour (70 mph) with urban area thoroughfares slowing to a speed of 80–100 kilometres per hour (50–62 mph). Portions of the highway; the section through Swift Current, an 8-kilometre (5.0 mi) section east of Moose Jaw, and a 44-kilometre (27 mi) section between the West Regina Bypass and Balgonie, are controlled-access. Highway 1 serves as a major east–west transport route for commercial traffic. It is the main link between southern Saskatchewan's largest cities, and also serves as the province's main link to the neighbouring provinces of Alberta (to the west) and Manitoba (to the east).

The four-lane divided highway passes through three major urban centres of Saskatchewan: Regina, Moose Jaw, and Swift Current. A site in the Western Hemisphere Shorebird Reserve Network, an internationally acclaimed shorebird conservation strategy, is at the village of Chaplin approximately equal distance between Swift Current and Moose Jaw. Located southwest of the Trans-Canada is the Cypress Hills Interprovincial Park, which features Fort Walsh and the highest elevation of Saskatchewan. Highway 1 traverses ranch lands, the Missouri Coteau topographical area, and rolling prairie agricultural plains.

The highway generally runs west to east along the route, following parallel with the transcontinental Canadian Pacific Railway route. The Trans-Canada Highway traverses historical settlement areas. The transcontinental railroad of 1885 brought settlers to southern Saskatchewan. Commemorative historical sites along the Trans-Canada Highway mark the historical changes of the 72 years since the CPR came through.

On November 9, 2011, the section of Highway 1 between Moose Jaw and Regina was designated as "Saskatchewan's Highway of Heroes" to honour province's soldiers who died in service.

== Origins ==
The Minister of Mines and Resources held the first Federal-Provincial Conference regarding the Trans-Canada Highway in December 1948. With consent from all provinces, the Trans-Canada Highway Act was passed on December 10, 1949. Following this a second Federal–Provincial Conference was held to bring together the final details for the agreement. The Highway Act aims for the completion of the Trans-Canada Highway route by December 1956. The third Federal–Provincial Conference hold April 25, 1950, saw Ontario, Manitoba, British Columbia, Prince Edward Island, Saskatchewan, and Alberta sign the agreement which provided federal funding for the proposed transcontinental highway. The shortest and most practical routes could be chosen by each province respectively, given that provinces adjacent to one another agree on the meeting locations. The transcontinental hard-surfaced two lane highway was to have pavement widths of 22 feet (6.7 m) and 24 feet (7.3 m); shoulder widths, low gradients and curvature; bridge clearances and sight distances; few railway grade crossings; and be able to bear load capacities of 9 tons an axle. As of 1950, 4,119 miles (6,629 km) have been agreed to. By 1955, the Trans-Canada Highway program had only seen 4,580 mi (7,371 km) of highway completed in areas outside of Quebec. 1,523 mi (2,451.0 km) of the paved 2,853 mi (4,591.5 km) of the Canadian highway Trans-Canada highway system had been completed by November 1, 1955, to Trans-Canada Highway standards. Premier T.C. Douglas presided over the opening ceremonies on August 21, 1957, opening the 403.9-mile (650 km) Saskatchewan segment of the Trans-Canada Highway.

The Special Projects Branch of the Department of Resources and Development administers the Trans-Canada highway Act checking specifications, and prior construction. The contributions from the Dominion Government to the provinces may be up to 50 per cent of the cost of construction approved by the Governor in council. The actual construction is controlled by each Provincial Highway Department respectively. The estimated length of mileage for Saskatchewan is 461 mi (741.9 km) of the total 4,933 mi (7,939 km).

The Saskatchewan portion of the Trans-Canada Highway come to completion in 1957; it was the first province to finish its section. The year 1962 saw the entire Canadian 4,860-mile (7,821 km) highway completed which came to a total expenditure of $1.4 billion (about $18.26 billion today). The last of the highway between Moosomin and Wapella was twinned and opened on November 6, 2008, providing a completely twinned corridor. The total cost of twinning was $217 million with the Canadian government contributing $59 million.

== History ==
A First Nation trail used by fur traders, and Red River carts pulling settlers effects was the first path between Moosomin and Fort Ellice, Manitoba. The transcontinental CPR paralleled this trail when coming through in the late 19th and early 20th centuries.

Provincial Highway 4, the precursor of the Trans-Canada Saskatchewan Highway 1 followed the surveyed grade of the transcontinental CPR between the Alberta and Manitoba border. Travel along Provincial Highway 4 before the 1940s would have been travelling on the square following the township road allowances, barbed wire fencing and rail lines. As the surveyed township roads were the easiest to travel, the first highway was designed on 90 degree right angle corners as the distance traversed the prairie along range roads and township roads. Two horse then eight horse scrapers maintained these early dirt roads.

One of the problems that came about was when the Manitoba survey met the Saskatchewan survey. The Manitoba survey allowed for 100 feet (30 m) road allowances placed east and west every 1 mile (1.6 km). This system was followed west of Manitoba until just north of Indian Head. Whereas, the Saskatchewan survey conducted in 1887, allowed for 66 feet (20 m) road allowances and placed roads east and west every 2 miles (3.2 km). The two surveys needed a 2-mile (3.2 km) correction which took years to smooth out.

Agriculture is Saskatchewan's main industry and taking grain to elevators was first accomplished by horse and cart, to be replaced around World War I by truck travel. Long haul trucking flourished between 1950 and 1970, and the Trans-Canada was completed across Canada by 1970. Since the 1970s, 17 times the number of grain trucks and 95 per cent of goods transported now are hauled by truck across the Saskatchewan.

== Speed limits ==
From the Alberta border (eastbound from Medicine Hat and Calgary), Highway 1 is a four-lane divided highway with a speed limit of 110 kilometres per hour (70 mph). (Short stretches through the infrequent urban areas are at 90–100 kilometres per hour (55–60 mph) though). Moose Jaw has 4 lane traffic bypassing the main portion of the city with an enforced 80-kilometre-per-hour (50 mph) speed limit with photo radar. At Regina, the official course is via the Regina Bypass, a controlled-access highway located south of the city that opened in October 2019, and has a speed limit of 100 kilometres per hour (60 mph). After Regina, Highway 1 continues onward to Brandon, Portage la Prairie, and Winnipeg.

== Communities ==
=== Alberta to Swift Current ===
Aerial view of Highway 1 crossing the rolling prairie of the Maple Creek Plain

Travelling west along the highway on the Alberta side, Highway 1 reaches Medicine Hat, Brooks, and Calgary. Travelling east, the highway begins near Walsh, Alberta, and crosses into Saskatchewan, entering into the Rural Municipality of Maple Creek No. 111, which was established December 10, 1917. Maple Creek, a town of 2,198 residents (2006 census), was established in 1883 and is located 8 kilometres south of the Trans-Canada Highway 1 via Highway 21.

The next RM is Piapot No. 110 and a ghost town of Sidewood an early ranching area of Saskatchewan. Sidewood served residents between 1911 and 1952. Piapot No. 110 first provided infrastructure improvements for this rural area in 1913 and is now an administrative division for a rural population of 392 residents. The small village of Piapot has a southerly access to Highway 1 also via Highway 614.

The village of Tompkins, and the town of Gull Lake are among the communities of Gull Lake No 139. Both Tompkins with its 173 residents and Gull Lake serving 965 residents have their own municipal government. Gull Lake is an older community establishing its post office April 1, 1889. The south Saskatchewan region, an early ranching area was home to the 76 Ranch. The ranch house, constructed in 1888, is now the Gull Lake School Division office. Within Gull Lake No 139, which was created in 1913, are several wind turbine generators that can be seen when traversing the Trans-Canada Highway.

In 1913 the road system consisted of miles of prairie trails. The roads gradually improved with the assistance of jointly funded Provincial and Municipal road programs such as the Grid Road program, the Main Farm Access program, and the Super Grid system, which led to the eventual formation of Municipal Maintenance Areas. The RM's of Gull Lake, Carmichael, and Webb formed Maintenance Area No. 1, the first in the Province.

— Sask Biz Piapot No. 110

A neighbouring village of Webb with its population of 44 is situated within the next Rural Municipality of Webb No. 138, just 2 kilometres (1.2 mi) south of Highway 1.

=== Swift Current to Moose Jaw ===
Swift Current No 137 becomes the next RM to travel through and here the unincorporated areas of Beverley and Java are the next communities along the route. Both of these communities are enumerated as a part of the RM bringing its population to 1,587 residents. The highway runs through three cities on the way from Alberta to Manitoba, of which Swift Current is the first. Swift Current was first established in the North-West Territories in 1883 and has risen to a population of 14,946.

The original route of this highway was via Chaplin Street through Swift Current. The Trans-Canada became a four lane expressway in 1968, and the new route went past Swift Current to the north. Motels, shopping malls and fast food enterprises are located along the highway route. Subdivisions and neighbourhoods now extend past the highway, so again highway 1 traverses Swift Current.

Excelsior No 166 R.M. is the next rural governing body out of Swift Current that encompasses the community of Waldeck directly on Highway 1 at the junction of Saskatchewan Highway 628. Rush Lake is 4 kilometres north of the highway. 1903 first saw Rush Lake become established, soon followed in 1906 by Waldeck, and 1909 for the RM in this area.

The town of Herbert with its post office established in 1904 has 742 residents now. Herbert once renowned as having 'The World's Choicest Wheat Lands' is at the junction of the Trans–Canada and Saskatchewan Highway 612. Morse, as well as Ernfold are unincorporated areas, which adds their populations to the 435 residents of R.M. Morse No 165. Morse is immediately north of Highway 1 at the intersection with Highway 644. The Morse Museum and Cultural Center celebrates pioneer history in a 1912 brick school house. Saskatchewan's third biggest grain marketing point in Saskatchewan as of 1912, continued on this route by setting a record for shipping 2-1/4 million bushels of wheat in 1915. Morse has erected large cattails for their roadside attraction. Ernfold is at the western edge of the separation of the east and west bound lanes of the Trans–Canada. The western route is about 15.3 km (9.5 mi) in length, and the eastern route is about 14.7 km (9.1 mi) long, before the highway comes together again.

Uren is the first community arrived at within Chaplin No 164. Uren bustled between 1911 and 1961. Chaplin, at the intersection of Route 1 and Highways 19 and 58, was established in 1907. It is an unincorporated area that adds its population to the 138 residents (2006 census) of Chaplin No 164. An American Avocet as well as Piping Plover are large statues built by the roadside commemorating the world-famous bird sanctuary at Chaplin, Saskatchewan. Valjean, and Secretan are also too small to have their own municipal governments and they are located along the highway proper. Valjean supported a post office between 1912 and 1968, whereas Secretan's post office survived from 1911 to 1970.

Wheatlands No 163 established in 1909 features the communities of Parkbeg as well as Mortlach. Parkbeg, an unincorporated area, had a post office established in the North West Territories in 1896. The community also lays claim to being the hometown of Saskatchewan Roughriders mascot Gainer the Gopher. Parkbeg is now located on Trans–Canada 1 east, a segment that is 16.5 kilometres in length. The Trans–Canada west is 13.3 mi (21.4 km) long and is about 2 km (1 mi) north of Parkbeg. Mortlach, a village of 254 people, is about 0.8 mi (1.3 km) south of the highway and established its post office just months before Saskatchewan became a province in 1905. Four major pipelines, TransCanada, Conoco, South Saskatchewan Pipeline, and Trans Gas find their home in Wheatlands RM.

There is only one community along the highway within R.M. Caron No 162, which is Caronport. The village of Caronport, 919 residents in 2006, did not receive a post office until 1947, but the RM was serving the area since 1912. Local Improvement District (L.I.D.) #9 started making area improvements as early as 1904.

=== Moose Jaw to Regina ===
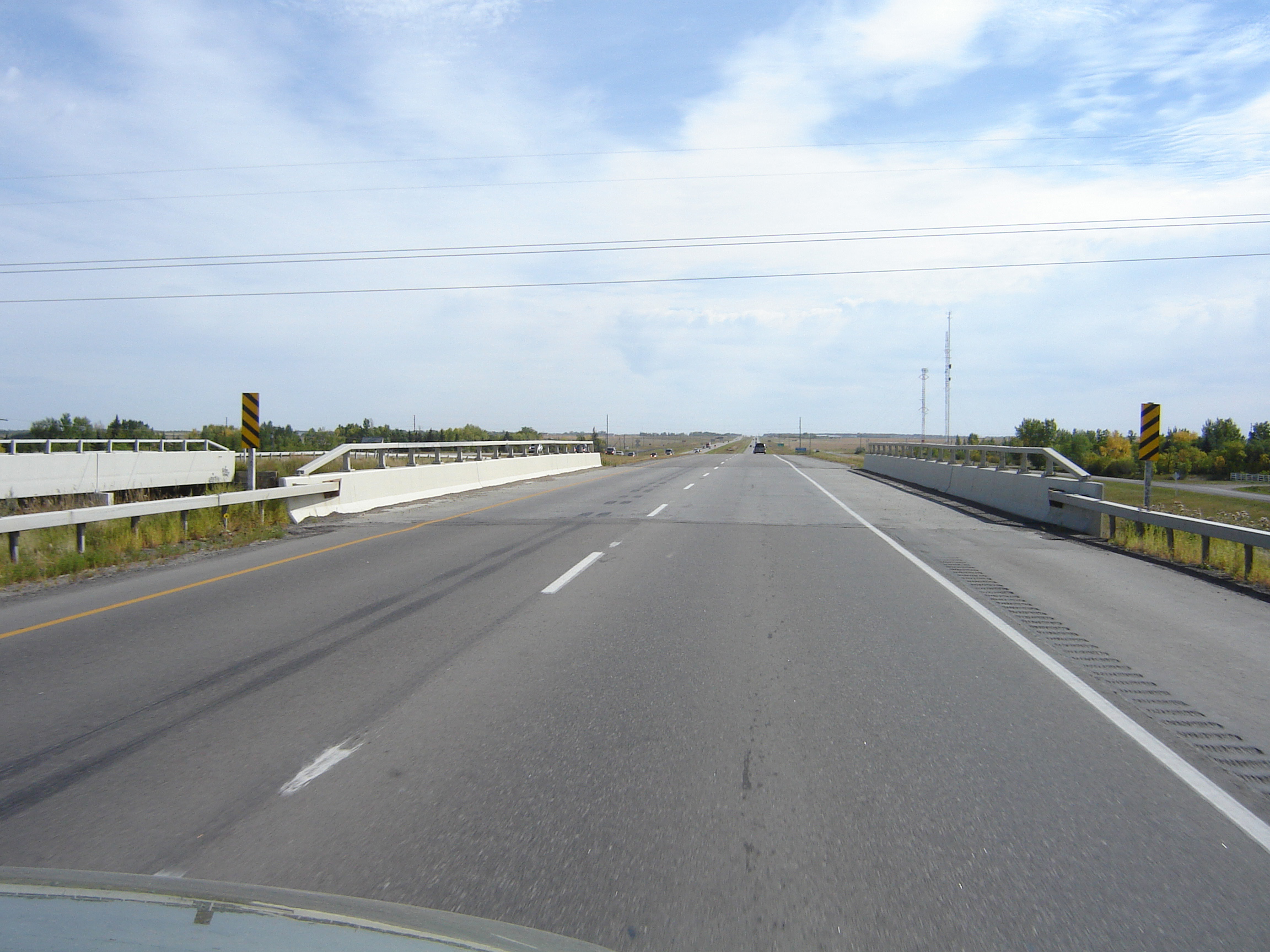
Divided highway (twinned) section Sk Hwy 1 leaving Regina (eastward)

Moose Jaw, also called "Little Chicago", is a city of 33,665 (per the 2021 Census of Population) along the Trans–Canada, and the second along this highway. Capone's Car, Moose Family and Mac the Moose are all large roadside attractions of Moose Jaw. Also, Moose Jaw Trolley Company (1912) is still an operating electric cable trolleys offering tours of Moose Jaw. Temple Gardens Mineral Spa Resort, Tunnels of Moose Jaw, and History of Transportation Western Development Museum. are major sites of interest of this city. The juncture of the Moose Jaw River and Thunder Creek produced the best source of water for steam engines, and Moose Jaw became the CPR divisional point. AgPro Inland Grain Terminal operated by Saskatchewan Wheat Pool. These large capacity concrete grain terminals are replacing the smaller grain elevators that were numerous along the highway, sentinels of most communities along the route. Improved technology for harvest, transport and road construction have made the large inland terminals more viable economically. The rural governing body around Moose Jaw is Moose Jaw No. 161, which serves 1,228 residents (2006 census), which includes the Moose Jaw, Canadian Forces Base. Meat-processing plants, salt, potash, urea fertilizer, anhydrous ammonia and ethanol producers abound in this area with easy transport access to the Trans–Canada Highway. Belle Plaine, an unincorporated area, is within Pense No 160. The RM serves only 490 residents as of 2006.

=== Regina ===
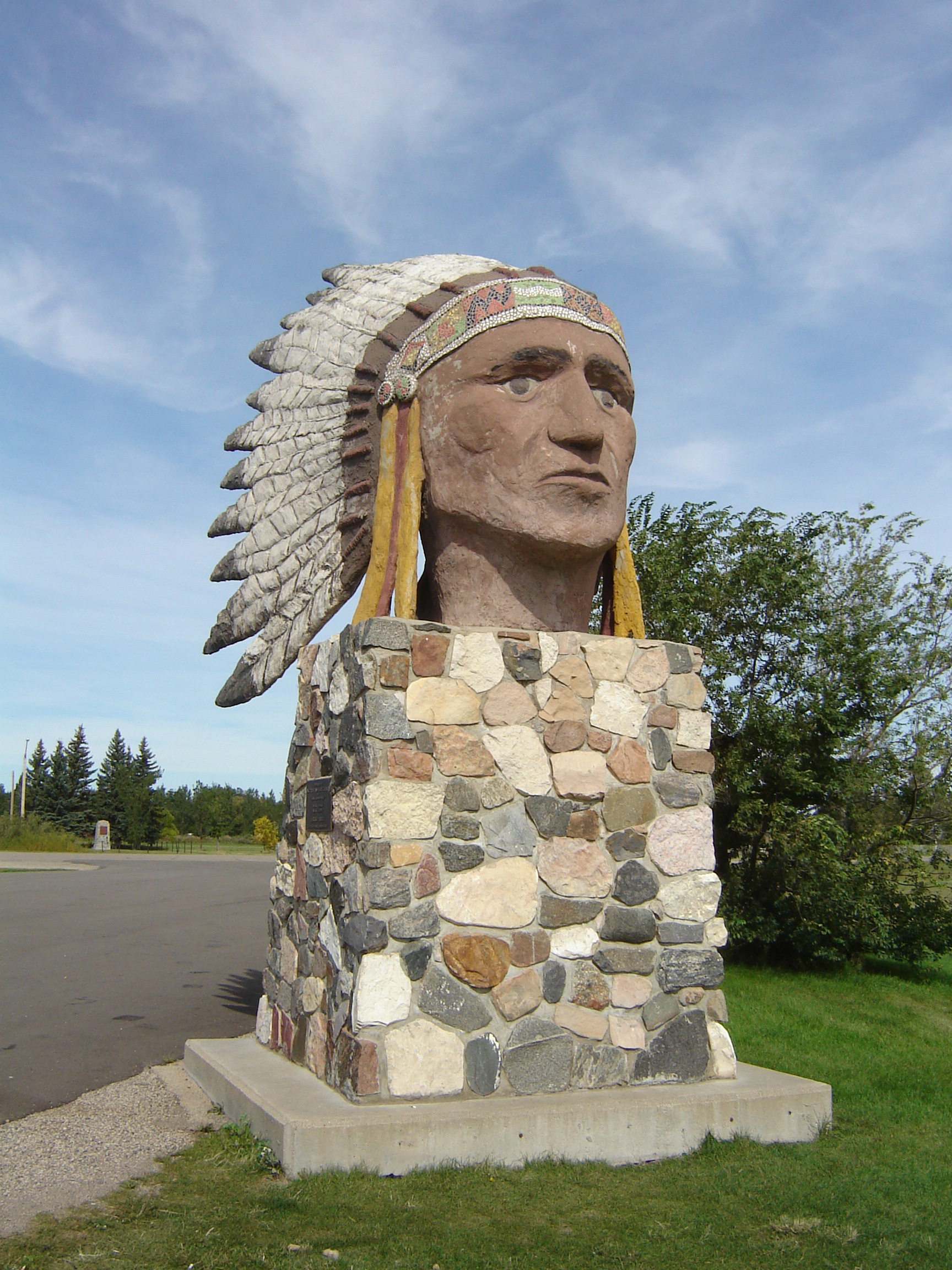
Indian Head Statue

Sherwood No 159 is the R.M. of the western perimeter around Regina, Saskatchewan's capital and the second largest city with a 2016 population of approximately 215,000 people. Sherwood R.M. provides essential services to 1,075 residents. As Regina expands, it annexes land from Sherwood No 159.

The Trans-Canada Highway originally followed the Trans-Canada Highway Bypass (a controlled-access highway also known as Ring Road), around the southeastern portion of the city and then exited at Victoria Avenue and continued east; a signed city route existed followed Albert Street and Victoria Avenue through downtown. As the city and congestion grew, especially to the east along Victoria Avenue which was an arterial road with traffic signals, a new bypass was required. The Regina Bypass, a partial ring road on the west, south, and east portions of Regina, opened in October 2019, and the Highway 1 designation was moved to the bypass. The Regina Bypass also serves a new route for Highway 11, the main route connecting to Saskatoon, Saskatchewan's largest city.

=== Regina to Manitoba ===
Edenwold No 158 is the R.M. east of Regina comprising White City, as well as Balgonie along the highway proper. Edenwold No 158 serves 3,611 residents. As Regina grows eastward, it annexes land from this RM. White City a town of 1,113 residents could also be considered a census subdivision of Regina. Balgonie an unincorporated area first established its post office in 1883. It is now situated at the intersections of Saskatchewan Highway 46, 364, 10, and the Trans–Canada. As part of the Regina Bypass project, Highway 1 between Regina and Balgonie was upgraded to a controlled-access highway and is the longest freeway section in Saskatchewan.

St. Joseph's is a hamlet on Highway 1 and is a part of South Qu'appelle No 157, the next R.M. along the way. The town of Qu'Appelle (624 residents in 2006) had historic beginnings with fur trading posts in this area, and is located within this R.M. Qu'Appelle was first named Troy, and was an administrative centre of the North West Territories.

Originally roadwork was done by horsepower, and the municipality owned its horses and equipment. It was found that roadwork under the supervision of a councilor cost half as much as that under a road commission system. There were problems with labor. One cold November payday the whole crew quit, with not one left to even feed the horses. In 1909 a foreman shot one of his crew; the [Indian Head] council minutes make no further comment.

— History of Indian Head and District Inc., Indian Head: History of Indian Head and District (1981)

Indian Head, a town with a population of 1,634, is within Indian Head No 156 along with the ghost town of Dingley and the town Sintaluta. Sintaluta has a population of 98. Indian Head has erected a large sculpture of an Indian Head at the side of the road.

Indian Head features the historical Bell Farm, which was a large farming enterprise of 53,000 acres (214.5 km^{2}). Pioneer homesteaders in the early 20th century farmed quarter section homesteads that were 160 acres (0.6 km^{2}) in size. This was a 1/2 mile by 1/2 mile (0.8 km by 0.8 km) farm.

Wolseley, a town of 782, is within the area of Wolseley No 155. The town of Wolseley is home to heritage properties such as the Provincial Court House building was constructed in 1893 and is the oldest surviving Court House building in the province. The Town Hall/Opera House, built in 1906 is a classic building and is used for all sorts of community events. A 1904 Queen Anne revival-style home is now the Grenfell 'Adare' Museum. This home built by Mr. Edward Fitzgerald was built on a large property that was annexed by Grenfell.

Elcapo No 154 contains the urban communities of Grenfell, Oakshela and Broadview. Grenfell has a population of 947, and Broadview 611. Grenfell is home to a 14,700 tonne inland concrete terminal as well as a large grain elevator located at the CPR line. Oakshela, an unincorporated area, is the only municipality served by the RM. The town of Broadview was an 1882 Canadian Pacific Railway divisional point. The Broadview Museum houses heritage of Broadview and area.

The town of Whitewood, 869 residents in 2006, was first established as Whitewood Station, North West Territories in 1883. Dr. Rudolph Meyer led a group of French Counts to the area of Whitewood in the 1880s to develop a community similar to the communities for nobility in Europe. Merchant's Bank Heritage Center is a heritage building of Whitewood, which celebrates its link to the French Counts of St. Hubert. The next RM along the way is Willowdale No. 153, which nestles Percival and Burrows within its population. Burrows is located at the junction of Highway 637.

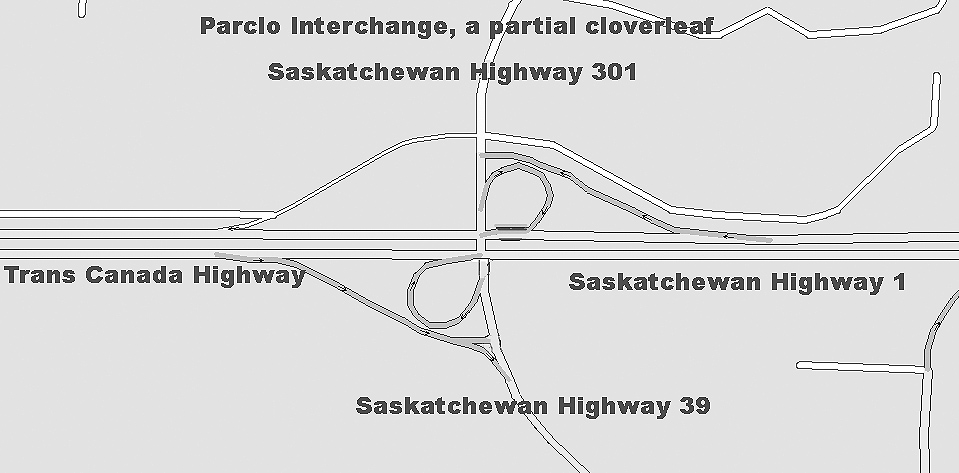
Parclo or partial cloverleaf interchange at Sk Hwy 1, the Trans Canada Highway (east west), Sk Hwy 39, part of the CanAm route (south) and Sk Hwy 301 (north)

Wapella, an incorporated town, located within the Martin, 339 rural residents.

Next along the way are Moosomin, Saskatchewan, Rotave, and Fleming, Saskatchewan all within the Moosomin No 121 R.M. The town of Moosomin, Saskatchewan hosts 2,257 residents at the junction of Saskatchewan Highway 8, 1, and 709.

The building of these roads is under the personal supervision of the rural councillors of the R.M. The Provincial Government each year makes a substantial grant to the Municipality for permanent trunk road building.

— Progressive Moosomin, industrial and commercial centre of Saskatchewan (1981)

The Trans–Canada Highway across Saskatchewan finally finishes up before the Manitoba–Saskatchewan border at Moosomin No. 121, where the freeway continues east to Winnipeg.

Sk Hwy 1 and Sk Hwy 6 Cloverleaf interchange south of Regina one of the first two SK interchanges that opened in 1967.

== Geophysical features ==
Highway 1 travels through geographical sites of interest as well as conservation areas. The highway begins in a mixed grassland ecoregion known as Maple Creek Plain. The Great Sand Hills are north of Highway 1 and the Cypress Hills region is south of the highway. The Cypress Hills Interprovincial Park features Fort Walsh and the highest elevation of Saskatchewan. Cypress Hills is accessed just 62 kilometres southwest of Highway 1. This area is known for its rolling with some steep hills and ravines.

Piapot Creek, Bear Creek, and Skull Creek are near the Wood Mountain Hills, also known as The Bench. After leaving the Maple Creek Plain, there is the Gull Lake Plain. Oil producing wells dot the landscape along with clumps of trees, sand hills, prairie grasses, and wind turbines producing wind energy.

Swift Current was founded as Rivière au Courant, which translates in English to "Swift Current". The Swift Current Plateau is a prairie grasslands area. The Chaplin Plain is the next grassland ecoregion, and Highway 1 is just to the north of Chaplin Lake, which is situated on a huge bed of salt, producing a saline lake. The Western Hemispheric Shorebird Reserve a large shorebird conservation area is located on Chaplin Lake, and is renowned internationally. This area between Swift Current to Moose Jaw is considered to be part of the Missouri Coteau topographical area (extending south to the United States).

The area to the south of Parkbeg is termed the Coteau Hills. Besant Recreation Site and campground is located west of Caronport. The Dirt Hills, a grasslands ecoregion are west of Moose Jaw. The city of Moose Jaw arose at the junction of Moose Jaw River and Thunder Creek. The Wakamow Valley (administered by the Wakamow Valley Authority) has been developed with trails, playgrounds, and picnic areas. Nicole Flats Nature Area (Buffalo Pound Provincial Park) is a preserved feature of the area. Both Moose Jaw and Regina are situated upon moist mixed grassland ecoregions, specifically called the Regina Plain. Regina is located south of the junction of the Wascana and Qu'Appelle Rivers, and the area is now called Wascana Lake. Aspen parkland prairie is east of Regina. The Moose Mountain Upland ecoregion is east of Regina and south of the Qu'Appelle River.

Fairly Lake is located within the town of Wolseley. The lake was created because the CPR dammed up Wolf Creek to provide water for steam locomotives. Grenfell Regional Park is located west of Grenfell.

Echo Valley and Katepwa Point are two neighbouring provincial parks near Broadview. Kipling Plain gives rise to the topographical feature called the Squirrel Hills and further to the east the Wood Hills. Moosomin Lake Regional Park, is located to the south of the Trans-Canada Highway in the Pipestone Valley on the shores of Moosomin Lake. The Melville Plain is the remaining ecoregion along the Trans-Canada Highway before the Manitoba border.

== Major intersections ==
Unlike most other North American jurisdictions, exit numbers on east–west highways are numbered from east to west (i.e., in the case of Saskatchewan, starting at Zero at the Manitoba border, and increasing when moving westwards to Alberta.

Rural municipality	Location	km	mi	Exit	Destinations	Notes
Maple Creek No. 111		0.0	0.0		Highway 1 (TCH) west – Medicine Hat, Calgary	Continues into Alberta
Maple Creek No. 111		12.7	7.9		Highway 635 north – Hatton	
Maple Creek No. 111	Maple Creek	39.4	24.5		Highway 21 – Leader, Cypress Hills Interprovincial Park	
Piapot No. 110		63.7	39.6		Range Road 3235 – Piapot	
Piapot No. 110	Sidewood	76.2	47.3		Highway 614 south (Sidewood Grid) – Eastend	
Gull Lake No. 139	Tompkins	88.6	55.1		Highway 633 – Nadeauville	
Gull Lake No. 139	Gull Lake	112.3	69.8		Highway 37 – Cabri, Shaunavon	
Webb No. 138		134.9	83.8		Highway 632 north / Webb Access Road (Range Road 3171) – Webb	
Webb No. 138		150.9	93.8		Highway 630 south – Simmie	
Swift Current No. 137		156.2	97.1		Range Road 3152	Eastbound access to Highway 32
Swift Current No. 137		157.5	97.9	499	Highway 32 west – Leader	Interchange; westbound exit and eastbound entrance
Swift Current No. 137		164.4	102.2		Highway 625 south (Lac Pelleter Trail)	
City of Swift Current		166.0	103.1	—	11th Avenue NW – City Centre	Interchange
City of Swift Current		167.1	103.8	—	Jackson Drive	Westbound right-in/right-out
City of Swift Current		167.6	104.1	—	Central Avenue to Highway 4 north – City Centre	Interchange
City of Swift Current		168.1	104.5	—	6 Avenue NE	Eastbound right-in/right-out
City of Swift Current		169.6	105.4	487	Highway 4 – Rosetown, Cadillac	Interchange
City of Swift Current		170.4	105.9		Ponderosa Trail	At-grade
Swift Current No. 137	No major junctions					
Excelsior No. 166	Waldeck	184.5	114.6		Highway 628 north (Range Road 3123)	West end of Highway 628 concurrency
Excelsior No. 166		193.6	120.3		Highway 628 south – Burnham	East end of Highway 628 concurrency
Excelsior No. 166		198.1	123.1		Range Road 3111 – Rush Lake	
Morse No. 165	Herbert	212.2	131.9		Highway 612 north	
Morse No. 165		215.6	134.0		Range Road 3093 – Neidpath	Former Highway 612 south
Morse No. 165	Morse	225.7	140.2		Highway 644 north (Range Road 3083)	
Morse No. 165		230.6	143.3		Highway 19 south – Hodgeville	West end of Highway 19 concurrency
Morse No. 165	Ernfold	236.6	147.0		Range Road 3073	Ernfold is located between eastbound and westbound lanes.
Chaplin No. 164	Uren	246.3	153.0		Range Road 3063	
Chaplin No. 164	Chaplin	255.2	158.6		Highway 19 north – Central Butte; Highway 58 south – Gravelbourg	East end of Highway 19 concurrency
Wheatlands No. 163		281.2	174.7		Highway 627 north (Range Road 3030) – Parkbeg	West end of Highway 627 concurrency
Wheatlands No. 163		291.2	180.9		Highway 627 south (Range Road 3025)	East end of Highway 627 concurrency
Wheatlands No. 163	Mortlach	296.6	184.3		Highway 626 south – Mortlach	
Caron No. 162		310.2	192.7		Highway 643 – Keeler, Caron	
Caron No. 162	Caronport	315.7	196.2		Caron Access Road (Township Road 174)	
Moose Jaw No. 161		323.3	200.9		Range Road 2280 – Boharm	
Moose Jaw No. 161		329.8	204.9		Range Road 2272 to Highway 363	
City of Moose Jaw		334.7	208.0	320	9th Avenue NW	At-grade; eastbound signed exit 320; westbound exit unnumbered
City of Moose Jaw		336.3	209.0	318	Highway 2 (Main Street) – Prince Albert, Assiniboia	Interchange
City of Moose Jaw		337.4	209.7		Highland Road	Eastbound right-in/right-out
City of Moose Jaw		338.7	210.5		Thatcher Drive	At-grade
City of Moose Jaw		341.0	211.9		Caribou Street	At-grade
City of Moose Jaw		341.4	212.1	312	To Highway 2 south / Manitoba Street Expressway – CFB Moose Jaw	Interchange; westbound exit and eastbound entrance; Highway of Heroes west end
Moose Jaw No. 161		343.5	213.4	—	Petrolia Road	Interchange
Moose Jaw No. 161		346.7	215.4	308	Highway 39 south – Weyburn, Estevan; Highway 301 north – Buffalo Pound Provincial Park	Interchange
Pense No. 160		357.3	222.0		Highway 642 south	West end of Highway 642 concurrency
Pense No. 160	Belle Plaine	363.9	226.1		Highway 642 north (Range Road 2240) – Bethune	East end of Highway 642 concurrency
Pense No. 160		377.0	234.3		Highway 623 south / Highway 641 north – Pense, Rouleau	
Sherwood No. 159		390.0	242.3		Grand Coulee Access Road	
Sherwood No. 159	Regina	395.4– 397.5	245.7– 247.0	258	Highway 11 north (Regina Bypass) / Ring Road east – Saskatoon	Interchange; exit 0 on Highway 11; Highway of Heroes east end; Regina Bypass west end
Sherwood No. 159	Regina	406.3	252.5	247	Highway 6 / CanAm Highway (Albert Street) – Weyburn, U.S. Border	Interchange
Sherwood No. 159	Regina	416.9	259.0	237	Highway 33 (Arcola Avenue) – Francis	Interchange
Sherwood No. 159	Regina	420.1– 422.1	261.0– 262.3	234; 232	Victoria Avenue	Signed as exit 232 (westbound) and exit 234 (eastbound); Regina Bypass east end
Edenwold No. 158		423.6	263.2	230	Range Road 2185	Right-in/right-out (both directions)
Edenwold No. 158	Pilot Butte	425.3	264.3	229	Pilot Butte (Highway 362 north)	Diverging diamond interchange; to Highway 624 north
Edenwold No. 158	Emerald Park	426.9	265.3	227	Great Plains Industrial Drive	Eastbound right-in/right-out; to Highway 624 south
Edenwold No. 158	Emerald Park	428.5	266.3	224	Emerald Park Road	Eastbound right-in/right-out
Edenwold No. 158	White City	430.7	267.6	223	Highway 48 east – White City	Interchange; former Highway 16 (pre-1976)
Edenwold No. 158	Balgonie	437.1	271.6	217	Highway 46 west to Highway 364 / Highway 622 south – Regina, Balgonie, Edenwold	Interchange
Edenwold No. 158	Balgonie	439.3	273.0	—	Highway 10 east – Fort Qu'Appelle, Yorkton	Interchange; eastbound exit and westbound entrance
South Qu'Appelle No. 157	St. Joseph's	444.8	276.4		St. Joseph's access road	
South Qu'Appelle No. 157		446.5	277.4		Highway 621 south	
South Qu'Appelle No. 157	McLean	453.2	281.6		Highway 620 (Range Road 2160)	
South Qu'Appelle No. 157	Qu'Appelle	467.3	290.4		Highway 35 north – Fort Qu'Appelle	West end of Highway 35 concurrency
South Qu'Appelle No. 157		468.0	290.8		Highway 35 south – Weyburn	East end of Highway 35 concurrency
Indian Head No. 156	Indian Head	481.0	298.9		Highway 56 north – Fort Qu'Appelle	
Indian Head No. 156	Indian Head	482.6	299.9		Highway 619 south (Range Road 2130)	
Indian Head No. 156	Sintaluta	498.6	309.8		Highway 606 south (Range Road 2113)	
Wolseley No. 155	Wolseley	513.6	319.1		Highway 617 south (Range Road 2101)	West end of Highway 617 concurrency
Wolseley No. 155		516.8	321.1		Highway 617 north (Range Road 2095)	East end of Highway 617 concurrency
Wolseley No. 155		529.8	329.2		Highway 47 south – Estevan	West end of Highway 47 concurrency
Elcapo No. 154	Grenfell	536.4	333.3		Highway 616 south – Peebles	
Elcapo No. 154	Grenfell	538.2	334.4		Highway 47 north – Melville	East end of Highway 47 concurrency
Elcapo No. 154	Broadview	562.9	349.8		Highway 605 – Kipling	
Elcapo No. 154		566.4	351.9		Highway 201 north – Kahkewistahaw First Nation, Ochapowace First Nation	
Willowdale No. 153	Whitewood	586.6	364.5		Highway 9 – Yorkton, Carlyle	
Silverwood No. 123	No major junctions					
Martin No. 122	Wapella	609.3	378.6		Highway 601 / Highway 703	
Moosomin No. 121	Moosomin	633.4	393.6		Highway 8 north – Rocanville, Langenburg	West end of Highway 8 concurrency
Moosomin No. 121	Moosomin	634.9	394.5		Highway 8 south – Redvers, U.S. border Highway 709	East end of Highway 8 concurrency
Moosomin No. 121	Fleming	648.1	402.7		Highway 600 (Township Road 131)	
Moosomin No. 121		653.6	406.1		PTH 1 (TCH) east – Brandon, Winnipeg	Continues into Manitoba
1.000 mi = 1.609 km; 1.000 km = 0.621 mi: Concurrency terminus; Incomplete access

== See also ==
- List of Saskatchewan provincial highways

Trans-Canada Highway
Previous route AB Highway 1	Highway 1	Next route MB Provincial Trunk Highway 1
