= Prairie View, Saskatchewan =

Canadian locality

Coordinates: 50.512°N 107.465°W

Prairie View is a locality in Excelsior Rural Municipality No. 166 in the province of Saskatchewan, Canada. Located east of Highway 628 along Prairie View Road (Township Road 182), approximately 15 kilometres (9 mi) north of Rush Lake.

== See also ==
- List of communities in Saskatchewan
- List of ghost towns in Saskatchewan
