= Gouldtown =

Gouldtown may refer to a community in North America:

- Gouldtown, Saskatchewan, Canada
- Gouldtown, New Jersey, United States
