= Gainer the Gopher =

Mascot of the Saskatchewan Roughriders

Gainer the Gopher is the mascot of the Saskatchewan Roughriders of the Canadian Football League. The Gainer costume is modelled after the Richardson's ground squirrel, commonly referred to as a "gopher" in many parts of North America. He is from Parkbeg, Saskatchewan.

Gainer, whose name is an anagram of Regina, made his first appearance in 1977 and has been entertaining Rider fans ever since. In 2006, Gainer was given the jersey number 13, symbolizing his contributions as the "13th man" on the field. Prior to this, he wore the jersey number 1/2. He also has two cousins named Leonard and Goof that usually only appear at Roughrider home games.

Gainer continues to be an ambassador for the Riders both at Mosaic Stadium during the football season and at community events all over Saskatchewan throughout the year.

In 2003 the Roughriders donated an old Gainer costume to the Canadian frigate HMCS Regina. Wearing naval combat dress and peaked cap, the ship's mascot is known as Gainer's seagoing cousin Gunner the Gopher.

Gainer was first 'played' by Don Hewitt of Regina in 1977. Don Hewitt was a reporter and on-air personality with CTV Regina from 1975 to 2021.

== Controversies ==
In 2006, Calgary Stampeders officials barred Gainer from appearing on-field during their west division semi-final game against Saskatchewan, arguing that it would attract attention away from their own mascot. In a 2019 game against the B.C. Lions, the mascot was criticized for dragging a stuffed lion plush by its tail and grabbing it at its crotch.

During the Roughriders' 2019 home opener on July 1, 2019, the team unveiled a new iteration of Gainer with a noticeably slimmer appearance and redesigned face with white eyes and green pupils. The new design was met with criticism from fans on social media, as well as former premier of Saskatchewan Brad Wall—who dubbed it "midlife crisis Gainer", and joked that he had been on "some sort of fad diet". The design was revised for the next home game on July 6, switching to black pupils; a video announcing the change featured Gainer throwing away green contact lenses.
