= Mortlach, Saskatchewan =

Village in Saskatchewan, Canada

Mortlach
- Village
- Village of Mortlach
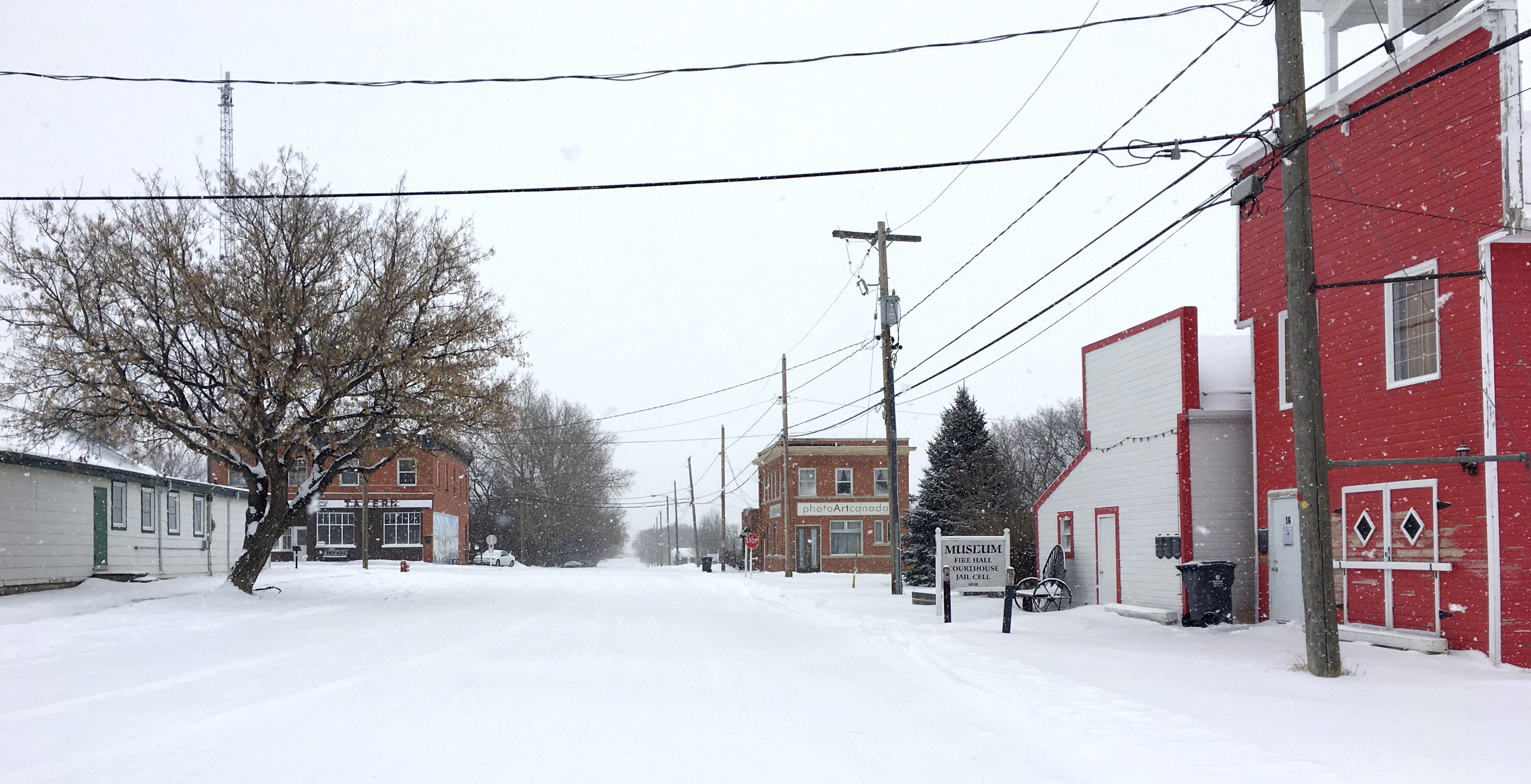
- Mortlach in 2019
- Motto: Meet me in Mortlach
- Location of Mortlach in Saskatchewan Mortlach (Canada)
- Coordinates: 50.455°N 106.064°W
- Country: Canada
- Province: Saskatchewan
- Region: Southwest
- Census division: 7
- Rural Municipality: Wheatlands No. 163
- Post office founded: 1905
- Incorporated (village): January 1, 1949

Government
  - Type: Municipal
  - Governing body: Mortlach Village Council
  - Mayor: Marg Apperley
  - Administrator: Anggy Ladner

Area
  - Total: 2.87 km^{2} (1.11 sq mi)

Population (2021)
  - Total: 274
  - Density: 95.6/km^{2} (248/sq mi)
- Time zone: UTC−6 (CST)
- Postal code: S0H 3E0
- Area code: 306
- Highways: Highway 1 (TCH) / Highway 626
- Railways: Canadian Pacific Railway
- Website: mortlach.ca

Mortlach (/ˈmɔːrtlæk/) is a village in the Canadian province of Saskatchewan within the Rural Municipality of Wheatlands No. 163 and Census Division No. 7. The village is on Saskatchewan Highway 1 about 40 km west of the city of Moose Jaw. Thunder Creek passes the community to the north, where it is joined by Sandy Creek. Mortlach became a village on April 19, 1906, and is one of two towns in Saskatchewan to have been incorporated as a town (April 1, 1913) to then be reverted to village status on January 1, 1949; the other is the village of Alsask.

== Demographics ==
Population history (1981–2016)
Year	Pop.	±%
1981	293	—
1986	311	+6.1%
1991	296	−4.8%
1996	276	−6.8%
2001	241	−12.7%
2006	254	+5.4%
2011	289	+13.8%
2016	261	−9.7%
2021	274	+5.0%
Source: Statistics Canada via Saskatchewan Bureau of Statistics

In the 2021 Census of Population conducted by Statistics Canada, Mortlach had a population of 274 living in 111 of its 127 total private dwellings, a change of 5% from its 2016 population of 261. With a land area of 2.87 km^{2} (1.11 sq mi), it had a population density of 95.5/km^{2} (247.3/sq mi) in 2021.

In the 2016 Census of Population, the Village of Mortlach recorded a population of 261 living in 108 of its 117 total private dwellings, a −10.7% change from its 2011 population of 289. With a land area of 2.76 km^{2} (1.07 sq mi), it had a population density of 94.6/km^{2} (244.9/sq mi) in 2016.

== History ==
Mortlach incorporated as a village on January 1, 1949.

=== Origin of name ===
While there are several theories about the origin of the name Mortlach, such as: it was named after an English village; it is a Gaelic translation of 'low hills'; and it may be a French term for 'dead lake' or Lac du Mort. The one that is generally accepted is that the village was named by George Stephen, the first president of the Canadian Pacific Railway (CPR), for his home parish of Mortlach, Scotland. Other community names such as Parkbeg, Caron and Craigellachie, site of the 'Last Spike', also hail from his home parish. A church in Dufftown in Banffshire, Scotland, with origins dating back to AD 525, bears the Mortlach name.

=== Homesteading days ===
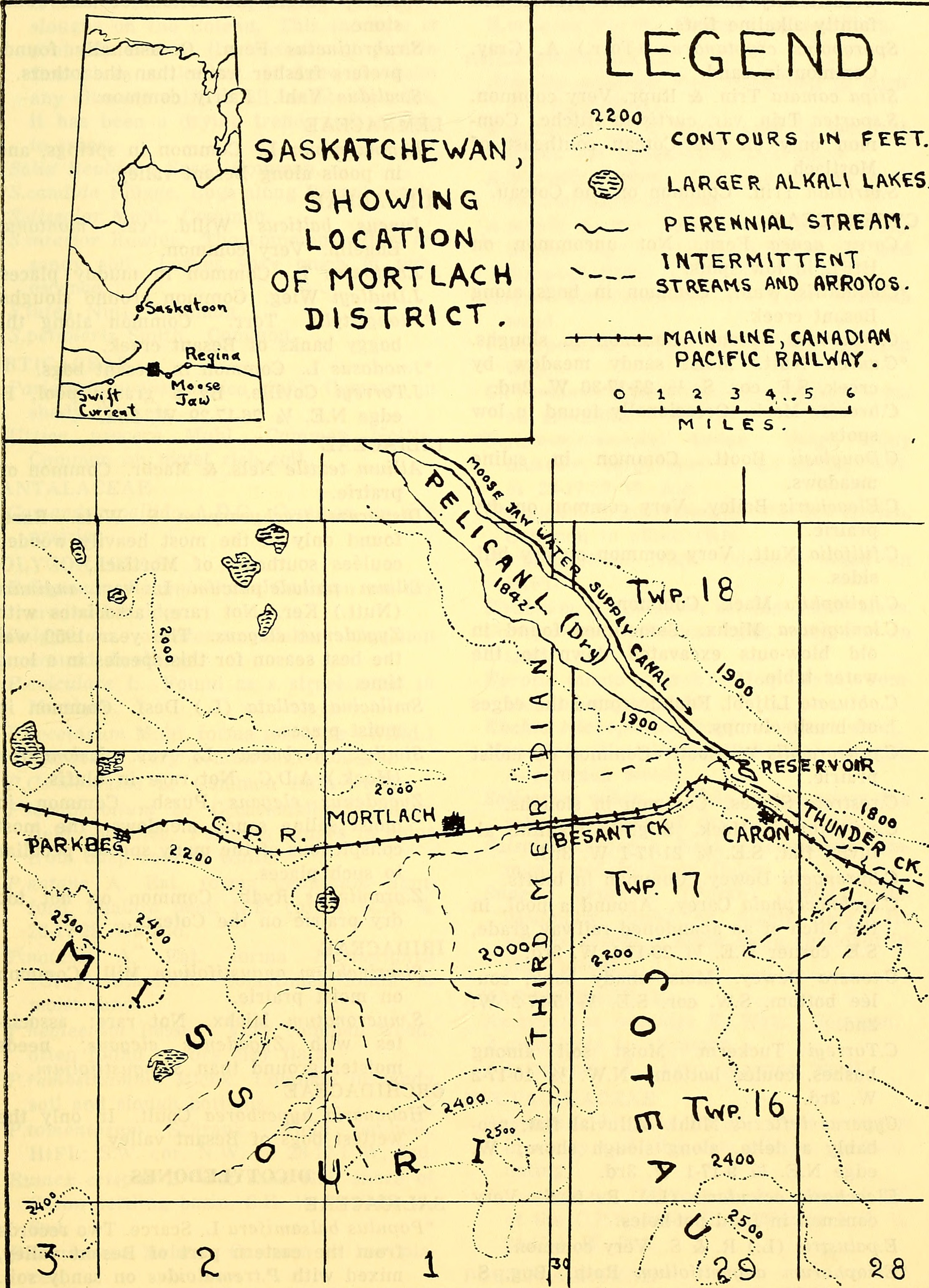
1951 map

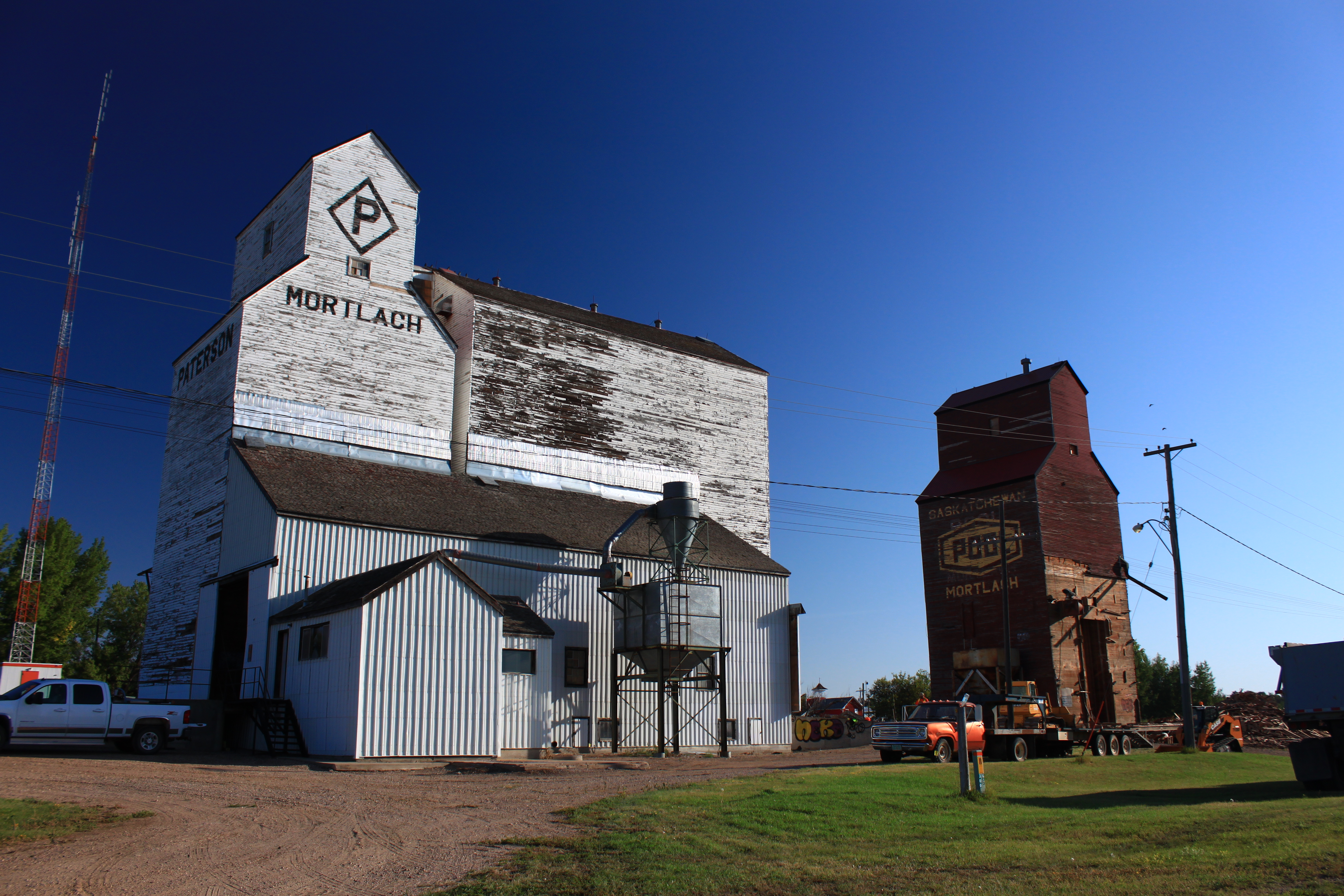
Historic grain elevators in Mortlach. Former Saskatchewan Wheat Pool on right under demolition.

In 1904, the Canadian Pacific Railway's (CPR) new line became operational and the Village of Mortlach came to life on land originally homesteaded in 1902 by a Khamis Michael, a native of what is today Iraq. By the spring of 1905, many people who had homesteaded the summer before along with new homesteaders began building. The first store, post office, and lumber and coal supply would be owned by Mr. E.B. Tedford. Scribner and Wheeler built the first hotel in 1905 and the first school was built that fall.

One year later, in 1905, Mortlach already had a Board of Trade with a strong business district including two businesses, three general stores, lumber and coal suppliers, post office, livery, hotel, meat market, and an implement and harness dealer. In the fall of 1905 there was a section house but no station until 1906, built along with an elevator. The first Royal North-West Mounted Police were stationed here in 1905 the same year that the Province of Saskatchewan was created. These were exciting times. The first weekly Mortlach newspaper was printed in Caron and the Methodist Church was also organized that year. The first doctor came to town that year and Mortlach fast became a popular place to stop and visit. 1907 saw many additional businesses grow, more hardware and implements, dry goods, general stores, harness shops, butchers, tinsmith, livery, real estate and insurance, and a hotel with a restaurant.

1907 was also the year of a smallpox epidemic, so a new house that was being built became an isolation hospital. The Bank of Hamilton opened a branch on Rose Street and Khamis Michael built a rink on Dean Street. The first exhibition was held in that rink on August 4, 1908. Mortlach incorporated as a village in 1909 with about 700 residents. The Star Theatre was built in 1910 by A.C. Baker. Soon there were many more businesses in this thriving community: a Red and White Store, two restaurants, blacksmith, grocery store, two cobblers, butcher, baker, undertaker, embalmer, flour miller, electric repair shop, Chinese laundry, veterinarian, Beaver Lumber, Imperial Lumber, Bank of Toronto, photo studio, newspaper publisher, livery stable and auto garage, and another implement shop.

== Government ==
The village is governed by a village council composed of a mayor, four councillors and a village administrator. Municipal elections are held every four years.

== Notable people ==
- Jack Poole, Vancouver-based businessman (April 14, 1933 – October 23, 2009)
- Megan Nash, Moose Jaw-based singer songwriter

== Attractions ==
Mortlach has a number of attractions, including a community orchard, churches, parks and restaurants, a library, museum and the local scenery. Music plays a part in Mortlach's culture – from the Mortlach Old Time Fiddlers to the community choir. In July 2009, Mortlach was awarded an artist in residence for a year.

== Education ==
Mortlach has one school that offers Kindergarten through grade 12, and supports its academic program with a mix of sports, cultural, and social aspects.

== See also ==
- List of communities in Saskatchewan
- List of villages in Saskatchewan
- Scottish place names in Canada
