= Rush Lake, Saskatchewan =

Rush Lake
- Village
- Village of Rush Lake
- Location within Saskatchewan Location within Canada
- Coordinates: 50°24′N 107°24′W
- Country: Canada
- Province: Saskatchewan
- Region: South-central
- Census division: 7
- Rural Municipality: Excelsior No. 166

Government
  - Type: Municipal
  - Governing body: Rush Lake Village Council
  - Mayor: Stacey Beisel
  - Administrator: Terrie Unger

Area
  - Total: 0.7 km^{2} (0.27 sq mi)

Population (2021)
  - Total: 55
  - Density: 79.1/km^{2} (205/sq mi)
- Time zone: UTC-6 (CST)
- Postal code: S0H 3S0
- Area code: 306
- Highways: Highway 1
- Railways: Canadian Pacific Railway

Rush Lake (2021 population: 55) is a village in the Canadian province of Saskatchewan within the Rural Municipality of Excelsior No. 166 and Census Division No. 7. Surrounding communities include Waldeck, Herbert, and the City of Swift Current.

== History ==
Rush Lake incorporated as a village on October 16, 1911.

== Demographics ==
Population history (1981–2021)
Year	Pop.	±%
1981	101	—
1986	88	−12.9%
1991	77	−12.5%
1996	71	−7.8%
2001	65	−8.5%
2006	50	−23.1%
2011	65	+30.0%
2016	53	−18.5%
2021	55	+3.8%
Source: Statistics Canada via Saskatchewan Bureau of Statistics

In the 2021 Census of Population conducted by Statistics Canada, Rush Lake had a population of 55 living in 29 of its 35 total private dwellings, a change of 3.8% from its 2016 population of 53. With a land area of 0.7 km^{2} (0.27 sq mi), it had a population density of 79.1/km² (205/sq mi) in 2021.

In the 2016 Census of Population, the Village of Rush Lake recorded a population of 53 living in 27 of its 27 total private dwellings, a −22.6% change from its 2011 population of 65. With a land area of 0.74 km^{2} (0.29 sq mi), it had a population density of 71.6/km^{2} (185.5/sq mi) in 2016.
