= RCAF Station Caron =

Former RCAF Station

RCAF Station Caron
- Caron, Saskatchewan in Canada

Site information
- Owner: Dept of National Defence
- Operator: Royal Canadian Air Force
- Controlled by: RAF (1942); BCATP (1942-19440

Location
- Shown within Saskatchewan
- Coordinates: 50°28′N 105°49′W

Site history
- In use: 1942-1944
- Fate: now the village of Caronport

Garrison information
- Occupants: No. 33 EFTS (Canada)

Airfield information
- Identifiers: IATA: none, ICAO: none
- Elevation: 1,875 ft (572 m) AMSL
Runways
Direction	Length and surface
13/31	2,800 ft (850 m) Hard Surface
7/25	2,800 ft (850 m) Hard Surface
1/19	2,800 ft (850 m) Hard Surface

RCAF Station Caron was a Second World War British Commonwealth Air Training Plan (BCATP) station located near Caron, Saskatchewan, Canada. It was operated and administered by the Royal Canadian Air Force (RCAF).

== History ==
=== World War II ===
The Station hosted No. 33 Elementary Flying Training School (Canada) RAF which opened on 7 December 1941 and was operated by Boundary Bay Flying Training School Ltd. It operated de Havilland Tiger Moths and Fairchild Cornells It was redesignated as No. 25 EFTS RCAF on 14 January 1944. However the Canadian Department of National Defence says the school was opened by the Royal Air Force on 5 January 1942 with The Aero Club of BC taking over operation of the School on 25 May 1942 and the school was closed 14 January 1944.

=== Aerodrome Information ===
In approximately 1942 the aerodrome was listed as RCAF Aerodrome - Caron, Saskatchewan at 50°28′N 105°49′W with a variation of 18 degrees east and elevation of 1,875 ft (572 m). The aerodrome was listed with three runways as follows:

Runway Name	Length	Width	Surface
13/31	2,800 ft (850 m)	150 ft (46 m)	Hard surfaced
7/25	2,800 ft (850 m)	150 ft (46 m)	Hard surfaced
1/19	2,800 ft (850 m)	150 ft (46 m)	Hard surfaced

A review of Google Maps on 10 June 2018 shows that none of the former aerodrome remains. It appears that the old taxiway and 13/31 runway are now occupied by housing and the remaining runways have been completely reclaimed for agriculture. The coordinates from the c.1942 publication appear to be slightly north of the actual location of the former airfield a more likely coordinate would be 50.461395°N 105.811784°W based on the drawings in the reference.

=== Relief landing field – Boharm ===
The primary Relief Landing Field (R1) for RCAF Station Caron was located approximately 10 mi (16 km) south-east. The site was located approximately 4 mi (6.4 km) south of the unincorporated community of Boharm, Saskatchewan. The Relief field was laid out in the standard triangular pattern on a turf all way field. In approximately 1942 the aerodrome was listed as RCAF Aerodrome - Boharm, Saskatchewan at 50°20′N 105°43′W with a variation of 18 degrees east and elevation of 1,983 ft (604 m). Three runways were listed as follows

Runway Name	Length	Width	Surface
5/23	3,300 ft (1,000 m)	---'	Turf
17/35	3,300 ft (1,000 m)	---'	Turf
11/29	3,300 ft (1,000 m)	---'	Turf

A review of Google Maps on 10 June 2018 shows a body of water at the location indicated, no trace of an airfield exists at this location, although the body of water is not possibly large enough to cover the whole airfield if it was at this exact location.

== Present ==
The aerodrome is now the village of Caronport.
