= St. Joseph's, Saskatchewan =

- Location within Saskatchewan
- Coordinates: 50°29′44″N 104°10′26″W
- Country: Canada
- Province: Saskatchewan
- Rural Municipality: South Qu'Appelle No. 157

Area
  - Total: 0.36 km^{2} (0.14 sq mi)

Population (2021)
  - Total: 150
  - Density: 361.1/km^{2} (935/sq mi)
- Time zone: UTC-6 (UTC)
- Highways: Highway 1 (TCH) / Highway 621

St. Joseph's, Saskatchewan, is a hamlet located at section 5 township 18 range 16 West of the 2nd meridian. It is located just east of Regina along the Trans-Canada Highway (Hwy 1), just west of its intersection with Highway 621, in the Rural Municipality of South Qu'Appelle No. 157.

== Demographics ==
In the 2021 Census of Population conducted by Statistics Canada, St. Joseph's had a population of 130 living in 41 of its 44 total private dwellings, a change of −0.8% from its 2016 population of 131. With a land area of 0.36 km^{2} (0.14 sq mi), it had a population density of 361.1/km^{2} (935.3/sq mi) in 2021.
