= Caronport =

- Village
- Village of Caronport
- Location within Saskatchewan Location within Canada
- Coordinates: 50°27′32″N 105°49′00″W
- Country: Canada
- Province: Saskatchewan
- Region: Saskatchewan
- Census division: 7
- Rural Municipality: Caron No. 162.
- Post office Founded: 1947-09-01

Government
  - Type: Municipal
  - Governing body: Caronport Village Council
  - Mayor: Dan Buck
  - Administrator: Gina Hallborg

Area
  - Total: 1.9 km^{2} (0.73 sq mi)

Population (2016)
  - Total: 998
  - Density: 523/km^{2} (1,350/sq mi)
- Time zone: UTC-6 (CST)
- Postal code: S0H 0S0
- Area code: 306
- Highways: Highway 1
- Railways: Canadian Pacific Railway

Caronport (2016 population: 994) is a village in the Canadian province of Saskatchewan within the Rural Municipality of Caron No. 162 and Census Division No. 7. The village is 21 km (13 mi) west of the City of Moose Jaw on the Trans-Canada Highway.

== History ==
Caronport incorporated as a village on January 1, 1988. It was named for the predecessor World War II British Commonwealth training base for pilots near the hamlet of Caron, i.e. Caron Airport. The airbase, RCAF Station Caron, operated from December 17, 1941, to January 14, 1944. Although the runways are now all defunct, the layout of the village was determined by the original runway placement.

== Demographics ==
Population history (1991–2016)
Year	Pop.	±%
1991	889	—
1996	1,147	+29.0%
2001	1,040	−9.3%
2006	919	−11.6%
2011	1,068	+16.2%
2016	994	−6.9%
Source: Statistics Canada via Saskatchewan Bureau of Statistics

In the 2021 Census of Population conducted by Statistics Canada, Caronport had a population of 1,033 living in 334 of its 386 total private dwellings, a change of 3.9% from its 2016 population of 994. With a land area of 1.82 km^{2} (0.70 sq mi), it had a population density of 567.6/km^{2} (1,470.0/sq mi) in 2021.

In the 2016 Census of Population, the Village of Caronport recorded a population of 994 living in 320 of its 372 total private dwellings, a −7.4% change from its 2011 population of 1,068. With a land area of 1.9 km^{2} (0.73 sq mi), it had a population density of 523.2/km^{2} (1,355.0/sq mi) in 2016. Caronport is the largest village in Saskatchewan by population.

== Education ==
Briercrest College and Seminary

Briercrest College and Seminary is a private Christian post-secondary educational institution. It consists of a college and a seminary, both of which offer Christian education. Between 1963 annd 2021, Briercrest hosted a teen youth conference known as Youth Quake every year in February. In 2022, the conference moved to May.

Briercrest Christian Academy

The Briercrest Christian Academy is a Christian high school. It is operated by Briercrest College and Seminary, and shares many facilities with the college such as cafeteria, gymnasium, and chapel.

Caronport Elementary School

Caronport Elementary is a Kindergarten to Grade 8 school, with an enrollment of about 115 students, and is part of the Prairie South School Division.

== See also ==
- List of communities in Saskatchewan
- List of villages in Saskatchewan
