= Rural Municipality of Caron No. 162 =

Rural municipality in Saskatchewan, Canada

Caron No. 162
- Rural municipality
- Rural Municipality of Caron No. 162

- Location of the RM of Caron No. 162 in Saskatchewan
- Coordinates: 50.455°N 105.881°W
- Country: Canada
- Province: Saskatchewan
- Census division: 7
- SARM division: 2
- Formed: December 9, 1912

Government
  - Reeve: Gregory McKeown
  - Governing body: RM of Caron No. 162 Council
  - Administrator: John Morris
  - Office location: Moose Jaw

Area (2016)
  - Land: 569.87 km^{2} (220.03 sq mi)

Population (2016)
  - Total: 576
  - Density: 1/km^{2} (2.6/sq mi)
- Time zone: CST
  - Summer (DST): CST
- Area codes: 306 and 639

The Rural Municipality of Caron No. 162 (2016 population: 576) is a rural municipality (RM) in the Canadian province of Saskatchewan within Census Division No. 7 and SARM Division No. 2. It is located in the southwest portion of the province.

== History ==
The RM of Caron No. 162 incorporated as a rural municipality on December 9, 1912.

== Geography ==
The burrowing owl (Athene cunicularia), an endangered animal, makes its home in this area. As well, the smooth arid goosefoot (Chenopodium subglabrum) and long-billed curlew (Numenius americanus) is of special concern in the ecoregion.

=== Communities and localities ===
The following urban municipalities are surrounded by the RM.

Villages

- Caronport

The following unincorporated communities are within the RM.

Organized hamlets

- Caron

Localities

- Abound
- Archydal
- Archydal Airport
- Caron
- Grayburn
- Grayburn Airport
- McKeown Airport

== Demographics ==
Population history (1981–2016)
Year	Pop.	±%
1981	1,100	—
1986	1,267	+15.2%
1991	541	−57.3%
1996	534	−1.3%
2001	518	−3.0%
2006	500	−3.5%
2011	516	+3.2%
2016	576	+11.6%
Source: Statistics Canada via Saskatchewan Bureau of Statistics

In the 2021 Census of Population conducted by Statistics Canada, the RM of Caron No. 162 had a population of 603 living in 220 of its 233 total private dwellings, a change of 4.7% from its 2016 population of 576. With a land area of 566.74 km^{2} (218.82 sq mi), it had a population density of 1.1/km^{2} (2.8/sq mi) in 2021.

In the 2016 Census of Population, the RM of Caron No. 162 recorded a population of 576 living in 216 of its 234 total private dwellings, a 11.6% change from its 2011 population of 516. With a land area of 569.87 km^{2} (220.03 sq mi), it had a population density of 1.0/km^{2} (2.6/sq mi) in 2016.

== Attractions ==
Besant Recreation Site is along the Trans Canada Highway.

== Government ==
The RM of Caron No. 162 is governed by an elected municipal council and an appointed administrator that meets on the second Thursday of every month. The reeve of the RM is Gregory McKeown while its administrator is John Morris. The RM's office is located in Moose Jaw.
