= Fleming, Saskatchewan =

Town in Saskatchewan, Canada

Fleming
- Town
- Location of Fleming in Saskatchewan Fleming (Canada)
- Coordinates: 50.0708°N 101.4989°W
- Country: Canada
- Province: Saskatchewan
- Census division: 1
- Rural Municipality: Moosomin
- Post office Founded: 1884

Government
  - Mayor: Trent Green
  - Town Manager: Kendra Lawrence
  - Governing body: Fleming Town Council

Area
  - Total: 2.17 km^{2} (0.84 sq mi)

Population (2021)
  - Total: 70
  - Density: 32/km^{2} (84/sq mi)
- Time zone: CST
- Postal code: S0G 1R0
- Area code: 306
- Highways: Highway 1 (TCH) / Highway 600

Fleming is a town in Saskatchewan, Canada. Per the 2021 census, with a population of 70 inhabitants, Fleming was the smallest official town in Saskatchewan by population. It is bordered primarily by the Rural Municipality of Moosomin No. 121, but also by the Rural Municipality of Maryfield No. 91.

== Demographics ==
In the 2021 Census of Population conducted by Statistics Canada, Fleming had a population of 70 living in 31 of its 34 total private dwellings, a change of −16.7% from its 2016 population of 84. With a land area of 1.89 km^{2} (0.73 sq mi), it had a population density of 37.0/km^{2} (95.9/sq mi) in 2021.

== See also ==
- List of communities in Saskatchewan
- List of towns in Saskatchewan
