= Rural Municipality of Elcapo No. 154 =

Rural municipality in Saskatchewan, Canada

Elcapo No. 154
- Rural municipality
- Rural Municipality of Elcapo No. 154
- Location of the RM of Elcapo No. 154 in Saskatchewan
- Coordinates: 50.563°N 102.685°W
- Country: Canada
- Province: Saskatchewan
- Census division: 5
- SARM division: 1
- Formed: December 12, 1910

Government
  - Reeve: Larry Parrott
  - Governing body: RM of Elcapo No. 154 Council
  - Administrator: Mervin Schmidt
  - Office location: Broadview

Area (2016)
  - Land: 846.04 km^{2} (326.66 sq mi)

Population (2016)
  - Total: 488
  - Density: 0.6/km^{2} (1.6/sq mi)
- Time zone: CST
  - Summer (DST): CST
- Area codes: 306 and 639

The Rural Municipality of Elcapo No. 154 (2016 population: 488) is a rural municipality (RM) in the Canadian province of Saskatchewan within Census Division No. 5 and SARM Division No. 1. It is located in the southeast portion of the province.

== History ==
The RM of Elcapo No. 154 incorporated as a rural municipality on December 12, 1910.

== Geography ==
The bigmouth buffalo (Ictiobus cyprinellus) is a species of special concern to environmentalists in this area.

=== Communities and localities ===
The following urban municipalities are surrounded by the RM.

Towns

- Grenfell
- Broadview

The following unincorporated communities are within the RM.

Localities

- Oakshela

== Demographics ==
Population history (1981–2016)
Year	Pop.	±%
1981	848	—
1986	784	−7.5%
1991	732	−6.6%
1996	663	−9.4%
2001	537	−19.0%
2006	489	−8.9%
2011	481	−1.6%
2016	488	+1.5%
Source: Statistics Canada via Saskatchewan Bureau of Statistics

In the 2021 Census of Population conducted by Statistics Canada, the RM of Elcapo No. 154 had a population of 392 living in 153 of its 174 total private dwellings, a change of −19.7% from its 2016 population of 488. With a land area of 824.3 km^{2} (318.3 sq mi), it had a population density of 0.5/km^{2} (1.2/sq mi) in 2021.

In the 2016 Census of Population, the RM of Elcapo No. 154 recorded a population of 488 living in 193 of its 200 total private dwellings, a 1.5% change from its 2011 population of 481. With a land area of 846.04 km^{2} (326.66 sq mi), it had a population density of 0.6/km^{2} (1.5/sq mi) in 2016.

== Government ==
The RM of Elcapo No. 154 is governed by an elected municipal council and an appointed administrator that meets on the second Monday of every month. The reeve of the RM is Larry Parrott while its administrator is Mervin Schmidt. The RM's office is located in Broadview.
