= Rural Municipality of Excelsior No. 166 =

Rural municipality in Saskatchewan, Canada

Excelsior No. 166 Waldeck No. 166 (1909–1916)
- Rural municipality
- Rural Municipality of Excelsior No. 166

- Location of the RM of Excelsior No. 166 in Saskatchewan
- Coordinates: 50.635°N 107.494°W
- Country: Canada
- Province: Saskatchewan
- Census division: 7
- SARM division: 3
- Formed: December 13, 1909
- Name change: March 1, 1916 (from RM of Waldeck No. 166)

Government
  - Reeve: Harold Martens
  - Governing body: RM of Excelsior No. 166 Council
  - Administrator: Dianne Hahn
  - Office location: Rush Lake

Area (2016)
  - Land: 1,198.35 km^{2} (462.69 sq mi)

Population (2016)
  - Total: 806
  - Density: 0.7/km^{2} (1.8/sq mi)
- Time zone: CST
  - Summer (DST): CST
- Area codes: 306 and 639

The Rural Municipality of Excelsior No. 166 (2016 population: 806) is a rural municipality (RM) in the Canadian province of Saskatchewan within Census Division No. 7 and SARM Division No. 3.

== History ==
The RM of Waldeck No. 166 was originally incorporated as a rural municipality on December 13, 1909. Its name was changed to the RM of Excelsior No. 166 on March 1, 1916.

== Geography ==
=== Communities and localities ===
The following urban municipalities are surrounded by the RM.

Villages

- Rush Lake
- Waldeck

Resort villages

- Beaver Flat

The following unincorporated communities are within the RM.

Localities

- Main Centre
- New Main Centre
- Old Beaver Flat
- Old Main Centre
- Prairie View

== Demographics ==
Population history (1981–2016)
Year	Pop.	±%
1981	1,088	—
1986	1,003	−7.8%
1991	945	−5.8%
1996	892	−5.6%
2001	855	−4.1%
2006	825	−3.5%
2011	959	+16.2%
2016	806	−16.0%
Source: Statistics Canada via Saskatchewan Bureau of Statistics

In the 2021 Census of Population conducted by Statistics Canada, the RM of Excelsior No. 166 had a population of 808 living in 221 of its 247 total private dwellings, a change of 0.2% from its 2016 population of 806. With a land area of 1,196.48 km^{2} (461.96 sq mi), it had a population density of 0.7/km^{2} (1.7/sq mi) in 2021.

In the 2016 Census of Population, the RM of Excelsior No. 166 recorded a population of 806 living in 228 of its 244 total private dwellings, a −16% change from its 2011 population of 959. With a land area of 1,198.35 km^{2} (462.69 sq mi), it had a population density of 0.7/km^{2} (1.7/sq mi) in 2016.

== Government ==
The RM of Excelsior No. 166 is governed by an elected municipal council and an appointed administrator that meets on the second Wednesday of every month. The reeve of the RM is Harold Martens while its administrator is Dianne Hahn. The RM's office is located in Rush Lake.

== Transportation ==
Rail

- C.P.R. West. -- serves Uren, Ernfold, Morse, Herbert, Rush Lake, Waldeck, Aikins, Swift Current

Roads

- Highway 628—intersects with Highway 1
- Highway 1—serves Waldeck, Rush Lake, and Herbert

== See also ==
- List of rural municipalities in Saskatchewan
