= Ernfold =

Village in Saskatchewan, Canada

- Village
- Village of Ernfold
- Location within Morse No. 165 Location within Saskatchewan
- Coordinates: 50.448°N 106.892°W
- Country: Canada
- Province: Saskatchewan
- Region: Southwest
- Rural municipality: Morse No. 165

Government
  - Type: Municipal
  - Governing body: Ernfold Village Council
  - Mayor: Christine Bauck
  - Administrator: Mark Wilson
  - MLA: Lyle Stewart
  - MP: Jeremy Patzer

Area
  - Total: 1.19 km^{2} (0.46 sq mi)

Population (2016)
  - Total: 15
  - Density: 12.6/km^{2} (33/sq mi)
- Time zone: UTC-6 (CST)
- Postal code: S0H 3C0
- Area code: 306
- Highways: Highway 1 Highway 19
- Railways: Canadian Pacific Railway

Ernfold (2016 population: 15) is a village in the Canadian province of Saskatchewan within the Rural Municipality of Morse No. 165 and Census Division No. 7. Initially situated alongside the original two-lane highway, the village was enclosed by the opposing lanes of the divided Trans-Canada Highway in 1973. In order to avoid complete destruction of the village the eastbound lane of the Trans-Canada Highway was rerouted approximately 3 kilometres (1.9 mi) south of the village, leaving the village sandwiched between the Trans-Canada.

The village's population peaked at around 300 citizens.

== History ==
Ernfold incorporated as a village on December 4, 1912.

== Demographics ==
Population history (1981–2016)
| Year | Pop. | ±% |
|---|---|---|
| 1981 | 91 | — |
| 1986 | 77 | −15.4% |
| 1991 | 64 | −16.9% |
| 1996 | 51 | −20.3% |
| 2001 | 50 | −2.0% |
| 2006 | 35 | −30.0% |
| 2011 | 30 | −14.3% |
| 2016 | 15 | −50.0% |
Source: Statistics Canada via Saskatchewan Bureau of Statistics

In the 2021 Census of Population conducted by Statistics Canada, Ernfold had a population of 20 living in 10 of its 12 total private dwellings, a change of 33.3% from its 2016 population of 15. With a land area of 1.29 km^{2} (0.50 sq mi), it had a population density of 15.5/km^{2} (40.2/sq mi) in 2021.

In the 2016 Census of Population, the Village of Ernfold recorded a population of 15 living in 8 of its 13 total private dwellings, a −100% change from its 2011 population of 30. With a land area of 1.19 km^{2} (0.46 sq mi), it had a population density of 12.6/km^{2} (32.6/sq mi) in 2016.

== Heritage site ==
The Ernfold School is a red brick, 1 1/2-story Georgian Revival structure built in 1919. The building served as a school until it closed in 1972. It was then used as a Baptist church for a short time until the church closed in 1989. On May 6, 1990 the Village of Ernfold passed (Bylaw No. 90-1), placing the building on the Canadian Register of Historic Places as a Municipal Heritage Property.

== See also ==
- List of communities in Saskatchewan
- List of villages in Saskatchewan
