= Thunder Creek (Saskatchewan) =

River in Saskatchewan, Canada

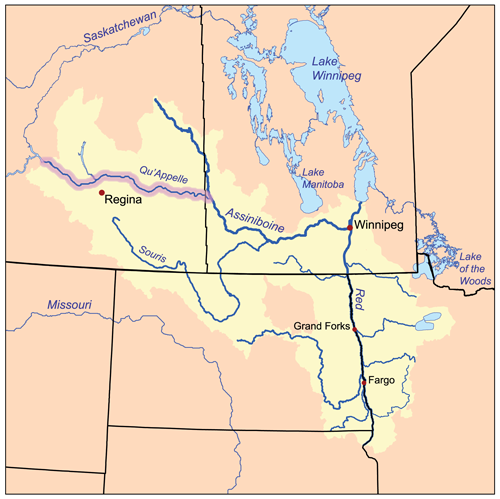
- The Red River drainage basin, with the Qu'Appelle River highlighted

- Location of the mouth in Saskatchewan Thunder Creek (Saskatchewan) (Canada)

Location
- Country: Canada
- Provinces: Saskatchewan

Physical characteristics
- Source
  - location: RM of Enfield No. 194
  - coordinates: 50.7861°N 106.8017°W
- Mouth: Moose Jaw River
  - location: City of Moose Jaw
  - coordinates: 50.3871°N 105.5295°W
  - elevation: 557 m (1,827 ft)

Basin features
- River system: Red River
- Tributaries
  - right: Sandy Creek

Thunder Creek is a river in the Canadian province of Saskatchewan. The watershed of Thunder Creek is within the semi-arid Palliser's Triangle in south-central Saskatchewan. It begins at a small, man-made reservoir near Lake Diefenbaker and flows in a south-easterly direction towards the city of Moose Jaw and the Moose Jaw River. The Moose Jaw River is a major tributary of the Qu'Appelle River For most of its course, Thunder Creek follows a valley called the Thunder Creek meltwater channel that was formed over 10,000 years ago near the end of the last ice age.

During the drought of the 1980s, the river, and the marshes and lakes along its course, almost ran dry. To stabilise water levels, a reservoir was built at the head of the river. The reservoir is supplied by pumping in water from nearby Lake Diefenbaker.

== Description ==
Thunder Creek begins at the man-made reservoir and flows into the Thunder Creek meltwater channel. Once in the valley, the river meanders its way along the valley floor. Along the way, it is joined by several creeks flowing in from the coulees. The western tributaries of upper Thunder Creek watershed drain a hilly plateau called the Vermilion Hills. There are four small lakes in a chain along the course that are part of two Important Bird Areas, including Paysen (Horfield) Lake, Williams Lake, Kettlehut Lake, and Pelican Lake. As the water level of Pelican Lake — the last lake in the chain of lakes — isn't always high enough to provide an outflow, Sandy Creek, which is about one kilometre downstream from Pelican Lake, becomes the primary water source for the last leg of Thunder Creek.

Communities found along the river's course include Moose Jaw, Boharm, and Caron. Highways 1, 19, 627, and 643 cross Thunder Creek.

=== Darmody Dam ===
South-east of Darmody, in a coulee upstream from Pelican Lake, Darmody Dam (50.6766°N 106.2381°W) was built on a tributary in 1929. The dam is 9.9 metres (32 ft) high and the reservoir has a capacity of 375 dam^{3} (304 acre⋅ft). It is owned and operated by the Saskatchewan Water Security Agency.

=== Tributaries ===
Thunder Creek tributaries include:

- Allin Creek
- Aquadell Creek
- Sandy Creek
- Wilson Creek

== Important Bird Areas ==
There are two Important Bird Areas (IBA) of Canada along the course of Thunder Creek. In 1990, the Riverhurst Management Plan, which was developed by Ducks Unlimited through the North American Waterfowl Management Plan, was initiated to stabilise water levels in the lakes and marshes by pumping in water from Lake Diefenbaker. Stable water levels provide habitat for birds and other wildlife.

=== Paysen /Kettlehut Lake ===
Paysen/Kettlehut Lake IBA SK 057 encompasses Paysen, Williams, and Kettlehut Lakes and the surrounding river valley. The IBA site totals 204.3 km^{2} (78.9 sq mi) with an elevation range of 640 m (2,100 ft) to 682 m (2,238 ft). It is Crown land that is composed of grasslands, ponds, marshes, and creeks. Birds found in the lakes and protected area include the western grebe, black-necked grebe, Franklin's gull, Forster's tern, marsh wren, sedge wren, common yellowthroat, LeConte's sparrow, and Nelson's sparrow.

=== Pelican Lake ===
Pelican Lake IBA SK 059 is about 26 kilometres (16 mi) downstream and south-east of SK 057 Paysen/Kettlehut Lake IBA and encompasses all of Pelican Lake and much of the surrounding landscape. Pelican Lake is the largest of the four lakes along the course of Thunder Creek and is recognised as a regional Western Hemisphere Shorebird Reserve Network (WHSRN) site. The IBA covers an area of 208.56 km^{2} (80.53 sq mi) with an elevation range of 570 m (1,870 ft) to 630 m (2,070 ft). Ducks Unlimited built three cross-dykes on Pelican Lake in 1964, 1973, and 1989 to help maintain water levels.

Some of the birds commonly found at the IBA include the American avocet, marbled godwit, Wilson's phalarope, grey plover, tundra swan, mallard duck, gadwall duck, western grebe, blue-winged teal, northern pintail, and the American white pelican.

== Besant Recreation Site ==
Besant Recreation Site (50.4636°N 105.9617°W) is a 300-acre provincial recreation site along the course of Sandy Creek in the RM of Caron No. 162. Access to the park is off the Trans-Canada Highway, 7 kilometres (4.3 mi) east of Mortlach.

Besant Recreation Site is well treed and has about 100 campsites, sandhills, a spring-fed pond, a swimming area, and access to Sandy Creek. The pond is stocked with fish. The park was home to the Sandy Creek Gospel Jamboree.

== Fish species ==
The most commonly found fish in the Thunder Creek river system is the northern pike. Other species include the common carp, burbot, largemouth bass, yellow perch, and walleye.

== See also ==
- List of rivers of Saskatchewan
- Hudson Bay drainage basin
- Tourism in Saskatchewan
- List of protected areas of Saskatchewan
