= Ralph the Dog =

Canadian football mascot

Ralph the Dog is the mascot of the Calgary Stampeders, a Canadian Football League team. Introduced in 1975, Ralph the Dog was the first mascot introduced by a CFL team. According to the team's official site, Ralph was "born" on Labour Day in 1974, and later "acquired" by the team in 1975.

Ralph cheers the Stampeders during their games, and has entertained crowds during events such as the Alberta Children’s Hospital mini-Calgary Stampede parade.

In 2006, the Stampeders banned the Saskatchewan Roughriders mascot, Gainer the Gopher from a game. The Stampeders organization justified the ban by saying Gainer's presence would take away from Ralph's. Stampeders president, Ted Hellard stated, ""Our fans have earned the right for us to be led on the field by our own mascot without competition from Gainer." Regarding the issue, Saskatchewan politician, Glenn Hagel, stated, ""It is a sad day in Saskatchewan," and adding, ""Imagine our shock and dismay at our opponent's display of bad blood and poor sportsmanship."
