= Log Valley =

Locality in Saskatchewan, Canada

- Interactive map of Log Valley
- Coordinates: 50°42′12″N 107°00′40″W
- Country: Canada
- Province: Saskatchewan
- Rural municipality: Morse No. 165
- Named: November 2, 1956

Government
  - Type: Unincorporated
- Elevation: 717 m (2,352 ft)
- Time zone: UTC−6 (CST)
- Area code(s): 306, 474, 639

Log Valley is a locality in the Canadian province of Saskatchewan located in Morse No. 165.

== See also ==
- List of communities in Saskatchewan
