= Parkbeg =

Community in Saskatchewan, Canada

Parkbeg, Saskatchewan
- Hamlet

- Location of Parkbeg in Saskatchewan Parkbeg, Saskatchewan (Canada)
- Coordinates: 50.4500°N 106.2667°W
- Country: Canada
- Province: Saskatchewan
- Region: Southwest
- Census division: 7
- Rural municipality: Wheatlands No. 163
- Post office Founded: 1911
- Incorporated (Village): 1920
- Restructured (Hamlet): December 31, 1957

Government
  - Governing body: Wheatlands No. 163
  - Administrator: Angela Molde
  - MP: Jeremy Patzer (Cypress Hills—Grasslands)
  - MLA: Doug Steele (Cypress Hills)
- Time zone: UTC−6 (CST)
- Postal code: S0H 0E0
- Area code: 306
- Highways: Highway 1 (TCH) / Highway 627
- Railways: Canadian Pacific Railway

Parkbeg is a hamlet in the Rural Municipality of Wheatlands No. 163, Saskatchewan, Canada. The hamlet is located at the junction of Highway 1 (the Trans-Canada Highway) and Highway 627 approximately 58 kilometres (36 mi) directly west of the city of Moose Jaw.

== Demographics ==
Parkbeg, like so many other small communities throughout Saskatchewan, has struggled to maintain a sturdy population causing it to become a semi ghost town with only a few citizens. Prior to December 31, 1957, Parkbeg was incorporated under village status, but was restructured to hamlet status under the jurisdiction of the Rural Municipality of Wheatlands on that date.

== Climate ==
Climate data for Parkbeg
Month	Jan	Feb	Mar	Apr	May	Jun	Jul	Aug	Sep	Oct	Nov	Dec	Year
Record high °C (°F)	10 (50)	17 (63)	22.5 (72.5)	30 (86)	37.5 (99.5)	42 (108)	38.5 (101.3)	38.5 (101.3)	37.5 (99.5)	31.5 (88.7)	20 (68)	15 (59)	42 (108)
Mean daily maximum °C (°F)	−7.7 (18.1)	−4.3 (24.3)	2.1 (35.8)	12.2 (54.0)	19 (66)	23.7 (74.7)	26.4 (79.5)	26.1 (79.0)	19.2 (66.6)	11.9 (53.4)	0.2 (32.4)	−6.1 (21.0)	10.2 (50.4)
Daily mean °C (°F)	−13 (9)	−9.2 (15.4)	−3 (27)	5.4 (41.7)	12 (54)	16.8 (62.2)	19.2 (66.6)	18.6 (65.5)	12.3 (54.1)	5.6 (42.1)	−4.6 (23.7)	−11.2 (11.8)	4.1 (39.4)
Mean daily minimum °C (°F)	−18.2 (−0.8)	−14.1 (6.6)	−8 (18)	−1.4 (29.5)	4.9 (40.8)	9.8 (49.6)	12 (54)	11.1 (52.0)	5.4 (41.7)	−0.9 (30.4)	−9.5 (14.9)	−16.3 (2.7)	−2.1 (28.2)
Record low °C (°F)	−40 (−40)	−39.5 (−39.1)	−29.5 (−21.1)	−23 (−9)	−7.5 (18.5)	−2 (28)	2.5 (36.5)	−1 (30)	−6 (21)	−21 (−6)	−32.5 (−26.5)	−42.5 (−44.5)	−42.5 (−44.5)
Average precipitation mm (inches)	10.1 (0.40)	9.2 (0.36)	17.8 (0.70)	17.8 (0.70)	48.1 (1.89)	64.5 (2.54)	65.3 (2.57)	48 (1.9)	38.6 (1.52)	15.9 (0.63)	13 (0.5)	9.9 (0.39)	358.4 (14.11)
Source: Environment Canada

== Services ==
Parkbeg has a café that also serves as a post office. There was also a grain elevator owned by Paterson Grain which was serviced by the Canadian Pacific Railway but which has now been demolished.

== Gainer the Gopher ==
Gainer the Gopher is the mascot of the Saskatchewan Roughriders, a Canadian Football League team. He is from Parkbeg.

== See also ==
- List of hamlets in Saskatchewan
