= Rural Municipality of Moosomin No. 121 =

Rural municipality in Saskatchewan, Canada

Moosomin No. 121
- Rural municipality
- Rural Municipality of Moosomin No. 121
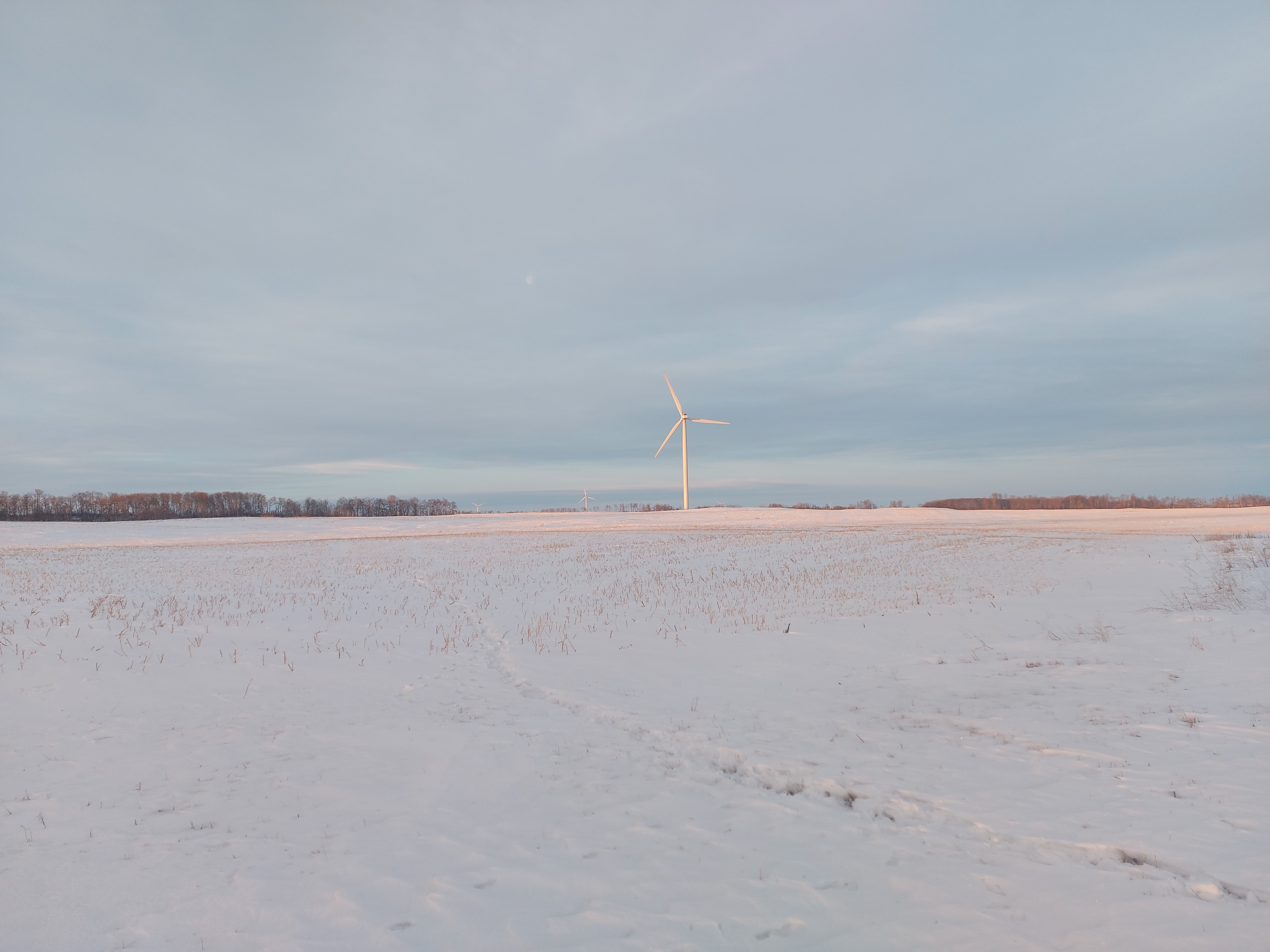
- A wind turbine from Red Lily Wind Farm in the RM of Moosomin

- Location of the RM of Moosomin No. 121 in Saskatchewan
- Coordinates: 50.165°N 101.598°W
- Country: Canada
- Province: Saskatchewan
- Census division: 5
- SARM division: 1
- Federal riding: Souris—Moose Mountain
- Provincial riding: Moosomin
- Formed: January 1, 1913

Government
  - Reeve: David Moffatt
  - Governing body: RM of Moosomin No. 121 Council
  - Administrator: Kendra Lawrence
  - Office location: Moosomin

Area (2016)
  - Land: 562.01 km^{2} (216.99 sq mi)

Population (2016)
  - Total: 470
  - Density: 0.8/km^{2} (2.1/sq mi)
- Time zone: CST
  - Summer (DST): CST
- Postal code: S0G 3N0
- Area codes: 306 and 639
- Website: Official website

The Rural Municipality of Moosomin No. 121 (2016 population: 470) is a rural municipality (RM) in the Canadian province of Saskatchewan within Census Division No. 5 and SARM Division No. 1. It is located in the southeast portion of the province.

== History ==
The RM of Moosomin No. 121 incorporated as a rural municipality on January 1, 1913.

== Geography ==
Moosomin and District Regional Park, upstream from Moosomin Dam, and Moosomin Lake are located in the RM. The black swallowtail (papilio polyxenes asterius), a species of special concern, makes its home in this area.

=== Communities and localities ===
The following urban municipalities are surrounded by the RM.

Towns

- Fleming
- Moosomin

The following unincorporated communities are within the RM.

Special service areas

- Welwyn

Localities

- Rotave

== Demographics ==
Population history (1981–2016)
Year	Pop.	±%
1981	603	—
1986	586	−2.8%
1991	522	−10.9%
1996	530	+1.5%
2001	528	−0.4%
2006	518	−1.9%
2011	504	−2.7%
2016	470	−6.7%
Source: Statistics Canada via Saskatchewan Bureau of Statistics

In the 2021 Census of Population conducted by Statistics Canada, the RM of Moosomin No. 121 had a population of 541 living in 221 of its 257 total private dwellings, a change of −10.3% from its 2016 population of 603. With a land area of 545.78 km^{2} (210.73 sq mi), it had a population density of 1.0/km^{2} (2.6/sq mi) in 2021.

In the 2016 Census of Population, the RM of Moosomin No. 121 recorded a population of 470 living in 187 of its 191 total private dwellings, a −6.7% change from its 2011 population of 504. With a land area of 562.01 km^{2} (216.99 sq mi), it had a population density of 0.8/km^{2} (2.2/sq mi) in 2016.

== Attractions ==
Moosomin is home to the Red Lily Wind Farm and Moosomin Lake Regional Park.

== Government ==
The RM of Moosomin No. 121 is governed by an elected municipal council and an appointed administrator that meets on the second Thursday of every month. The reeve of the RM is David Moffatt while its administrator is Kendra Lawrence. The RM's office is located in Moosomin.

== Transportation ==
Highway 1 (the Trans-Canada Highway) and Highway 8 intersect within this RM.
