= Megan Nash =

Canadian singer-songwriter

Megan Nash (born November 6, 1989) is a Canadian singer-songwriter from Mortlach, Saskatchewan. Her latest album Soft Focus Futures was released on November 3, 2021.

Nash released Song Harvest Volume One on March 17, 2015. The album was recorded live off the floor of an 100-year-old church where she wrote the songs. The tracks were recorded with minimal production, with just guitar and vocals.

In 2016, Nash was nominated for Songwriter of the Year at the Western Canadian Music Awards. Nash performed at the Regina Folk Festival.

In 2017, Nash performed at Merlefest in North Carolina. In September, she toured Europe as part of "About Songs Canadian Youngbloods Tour" alongside Devarrow and Owen Meany's Batting Stance.Seeker was released on September 22, 2017.

In 2018, Nash returned to Europe, performing solo headlining dates and opening for Shred Kelly. She performed on the main stage at the Ness Creek Music Festival in July with her back up band Bears in Hazenmore. Nash was nominated for Breakout Artist of the Year at the Western Canadian Music Awards. Nash's album Seeker was voted Best Album of 2018 by Prairie Dog Readers.
