= Gouldtown, Saskatchewan =

Unincorporated community in Saskatchewan, Canada

Coordinates: 50°37′0″N 107°13′2″W

Gouldtown
- Hamlet
- Interactive map of Gouldtown
- Country: Canada
- Province: Saskatchewan
- Rural municipality: Morse No. 165
- Time zone: UTC-6 (CST)
- Area code(s): 306, 639

Gouldtown is a hamlet in the Canadian province of Saskatchewan located in the Rural Municipality of Morse No. 165. It is about 12 miles north of Herbert. Gouldtown is home to approximately 10 people. Its amenities include a post office and well.

== See also ==
- List of communities in Saskatchewan
- List of hamlets in Saskatchewan
