= Red Lily Wind Farm =

Wind farm in Saskatchewan, Canada

Coordinates: 50.189°N 101.735°W

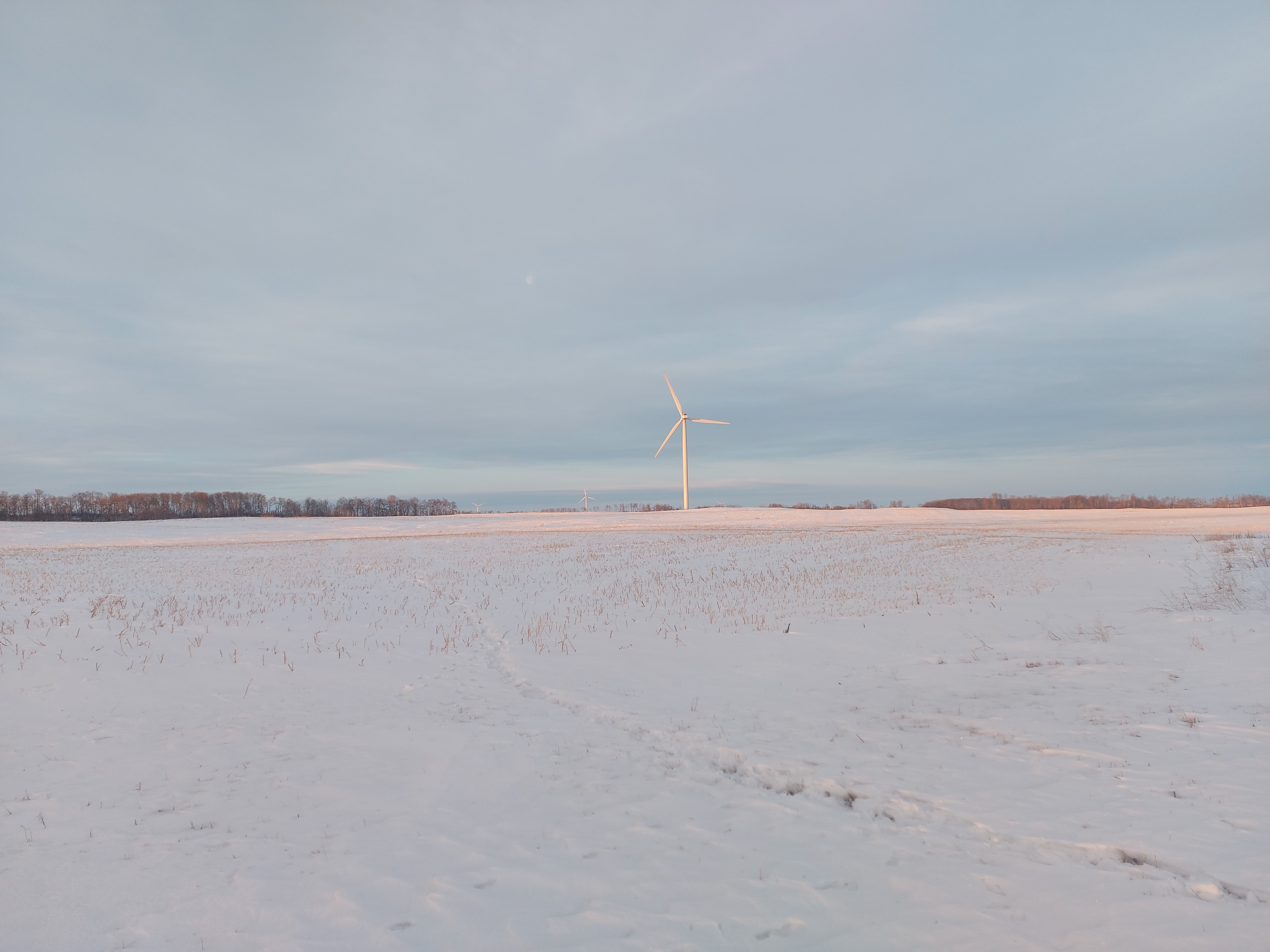
Red Lily Wind Farm in the RM of Moosomin

The Red Lily Wind Farm is a Red Lily Wind Energy Partnership facility situated north-west of Moosomin, Saskatchewan, in the RM of Moosomin No. 121. The facility is owned by Concorde Pacific and developed and constructed by Algonquin Power. The wind farm will consist of sixteen V82-1.65 MW wind turbines, for a total of 25 MW. At a cost of $60 million, work on the project started in 2010, with the facility coming online (at 26.4 MW) in February 2011. The facility is being constructed under a long-term, 25-year, power purchase agreement with SaskPower.

== Description ==
Installed in 2010, the wind farm consists of 16, V82-1.65 MW wind turbines.

== See also ==
- List of wind farms in Canada
