= Uniforms of the Royal Canadian Navy =

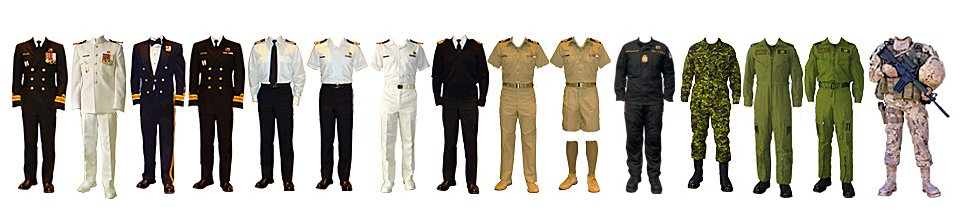
The Royal Canadian Navy wears a full range of ceremonial, mess and service dress. When deployed, RCN personnel wear the operational uniform that is most appropriate for the working environment.

The uniforms of the Royal Canadian Navy are a variety of different official dress worn by members of the Royal Canadian Navy while on duty. Originally, the uniforms of the RCN were modelled after their counterparts from the United Kingdom. However, after the RCN was merged with the Canadian Army and the Royal Canadian Air Force in 1968 to form the single-service Canadian Armed Forces, the RCN began to wear "Canadian Armed Forces green" uniforms, worn throughout the Canadian Armed Forces

Distinct uniforms for the different environmental branches of the Canadian Armed Forces were not introduced until 1 July 1985, with the roll-out of distinctive environmental uniform (DEU). Members of the naval, air, and land forces received uniforms distinct to their service branch or "environment". While the term "DEU" refers to the different environmental uniforms, colloquial usage of the term refers to the service dress uniforms of the Canadian Armed Forces.

Sea element personnel were issued a "navy blue" (actually a tone of black according to Canadian Forces Dress Instructions) double-breasted, six-button jacket and trousers, and white peaked cap. For the summer periods, an optional white uniform may be worn; it consists of a white tunic with closed stand-up collar, and with black shoulder boards for officers; white trousers; white web belt for the trousers; and white socks and shoes. In reinstating the uniforms for the sea element personnel, the Canadian Forces deviated from several common conventions in naval/maritime uniforms generally; notably, they largely dispensed with distinctions between officers' and non-commissioned members' uniforms other than in insignia and accoutrements, eliminating the sailor suit and sailor cap formerly worn by junior non-commissioned members in favour of a common service dress uniform for all ranks.

The following are the different categories of naval uniforms as listed in the Canadian Armed Forces Dress Instructions:

== No. 1 (Ceremonial) Dress ==
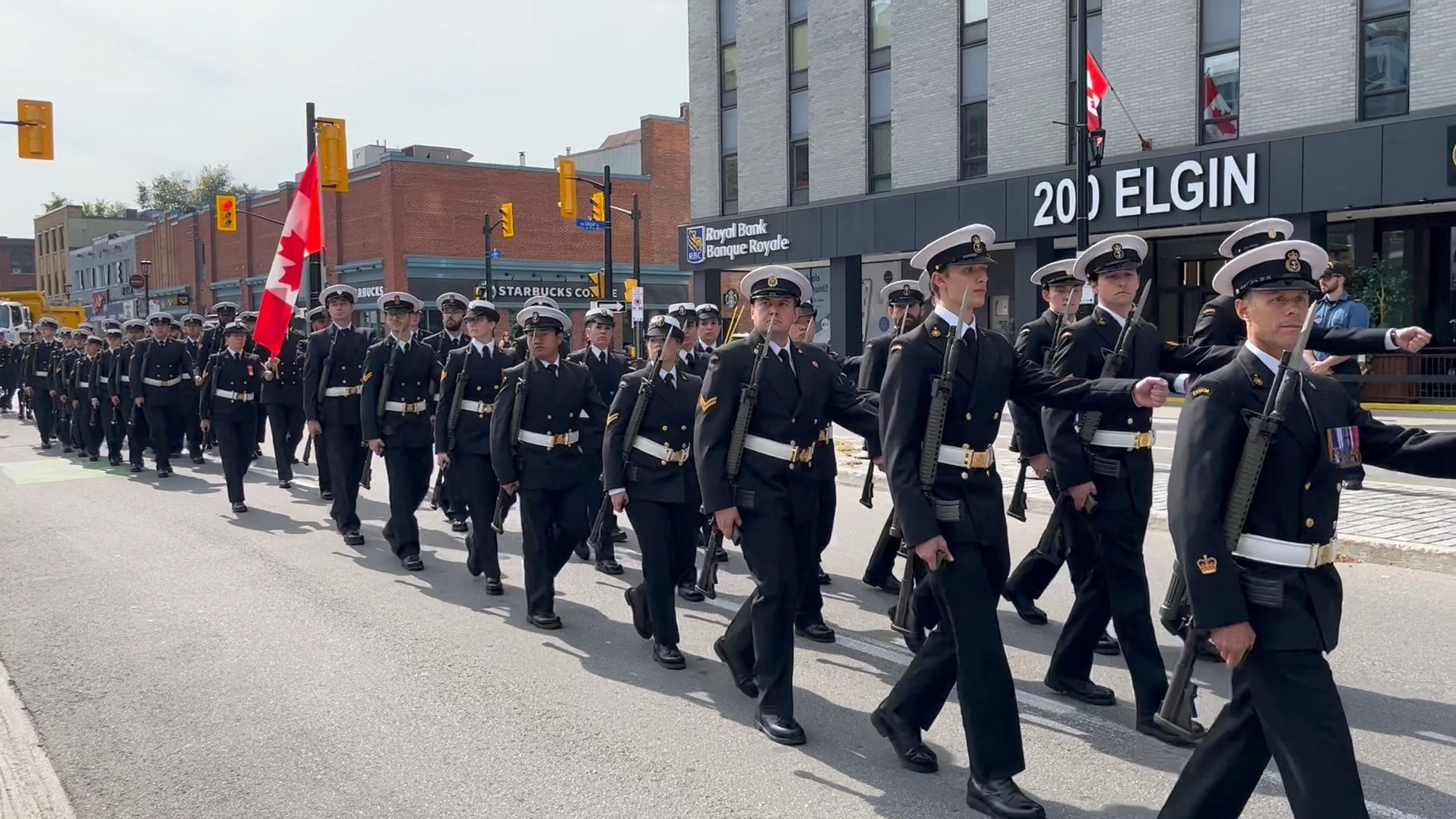
Royal Canadian Navy sailors parading in No. 1 Dress, with medals and accoutrements

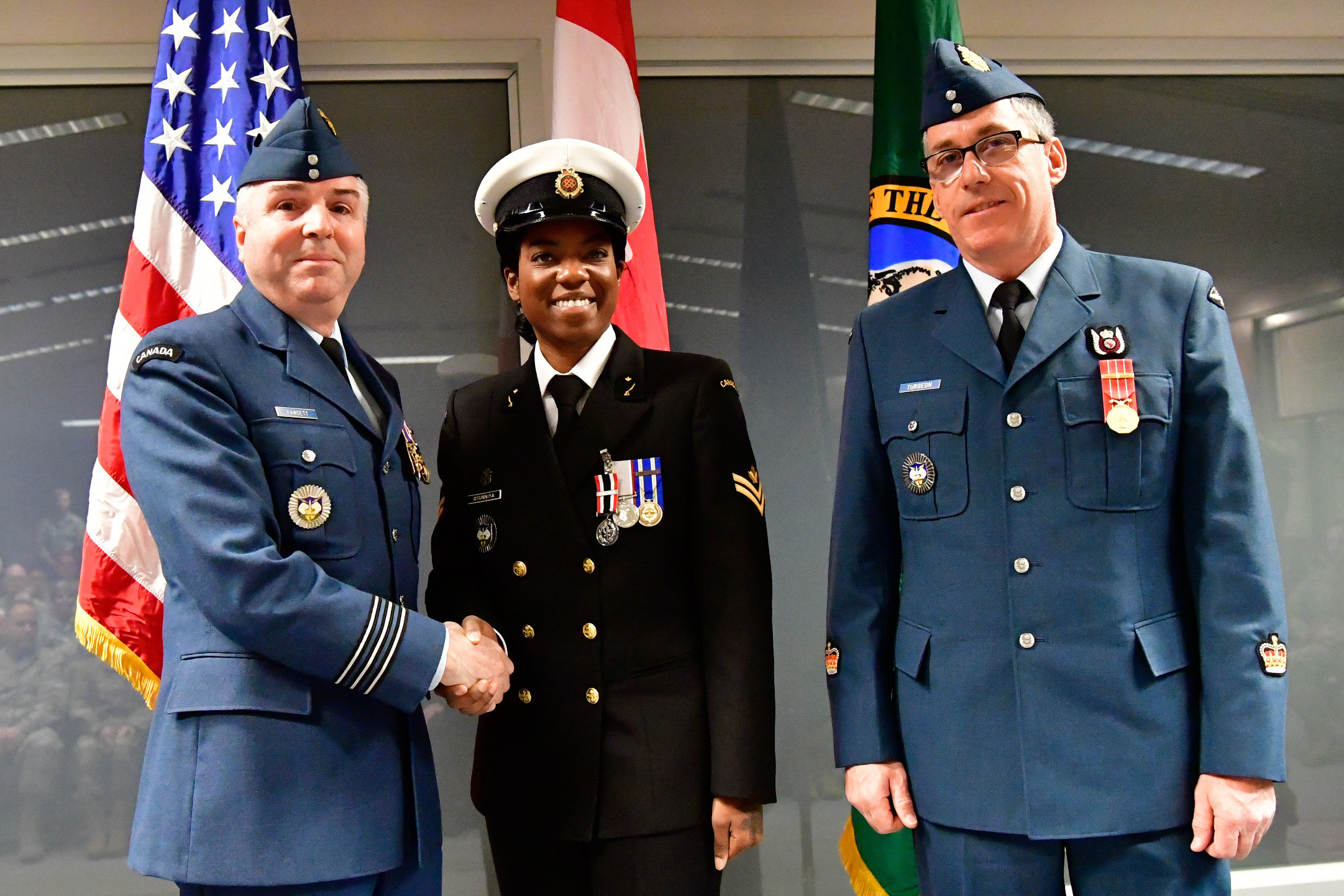
A master seaman of the Royal Canadian Navy (centre foreground) in No. 1A Dress

- No. 1 – Navy blue, double-breasted coat and trousers naval dress uniform worn with a white long-sleeve shirt and black necktie, with full-sized medals, swords, and other accoutrements
- No. 1A – Naval dress uniform with medals only
- No. 1C – White high-collar tunic and white trousers, with medals
- No. 1D – White high-collar uniform, with ribbons only

== No. 2 (Mess) Dress ==
- No. 2 – Navy blue mess uniform consisting of a mess jacket (captains and above wear tailcoats), mess trousers (officers have gold lacing), authorized white evening shirt, hand-tied black bow tie, white vest (blue vest for "mess undress") or black or other branch cummerbund, and black oxford shoes. Miniature medals are worn.
- No. 2A – As per No. 2 but with a white mess jacket.
- No. 2B – Normal service dress, however worn with a black bow tie instead of the neck tie, oxford shoes and ribbons only (without medals). Worn without headdress and name tags. Worn by personnel not in possession of mess kit, which is purchased at the member's expense.
- No. 2C – Shipboard mess order. Consists of a short-sleeved shirt and black trousers or skirt, worn with a cummerbund and without ribbons, specialist skill insignia, and name tags. Referred to as "Red Sea rig."
- No. 2D – Canadian Forces Standard (the midnight blues) which was worn by all members of the CF, during the unified uniform period (1970 to 1986). It is the same as Air Force No. 2.

== No. 3 (Service) Dress ==
Also called a "walking-out" or "duty uniform", it is the military equivalent of the business suit. It was the standard uniform for appearing in public (hence the moniker "walking-out dress"). The Navy has an optional white summer uniform with a white high-collared tunic.

- No. 3 – Like No. 1A, however only ribbons, not medals, are worn.
- No. 3A – White long-sleeve shirt with neck tie and black trousers. (Worn indoors when an occasion allows the removal of jackets for a more casual work appearance or with headdress when moving between adjacent buildings within the confines of DND property.)
- No. 3B – White, short-sleeve shirt, with ribbons, specialist skill insignias, and name tag, black trousers and black footwear. White trousers and white oxfords may be worn during summer dress months.
- No. 3C – obsolete

== No. 4 (Base) Dress ==
When DEU was introduced, Naval personnel were issued No. 4 (Base) Dress, which consisted of a jacket and trousers similar to old CF work dress but in black. It was worn with a white dress shirt — open-necked or with necktie — or with the Naval blue work shirt.

This uniform has since been phased out and replaced with the No 5 (Naval Combat) Dress.

== No. 5 (Naval Combat) Dress ==
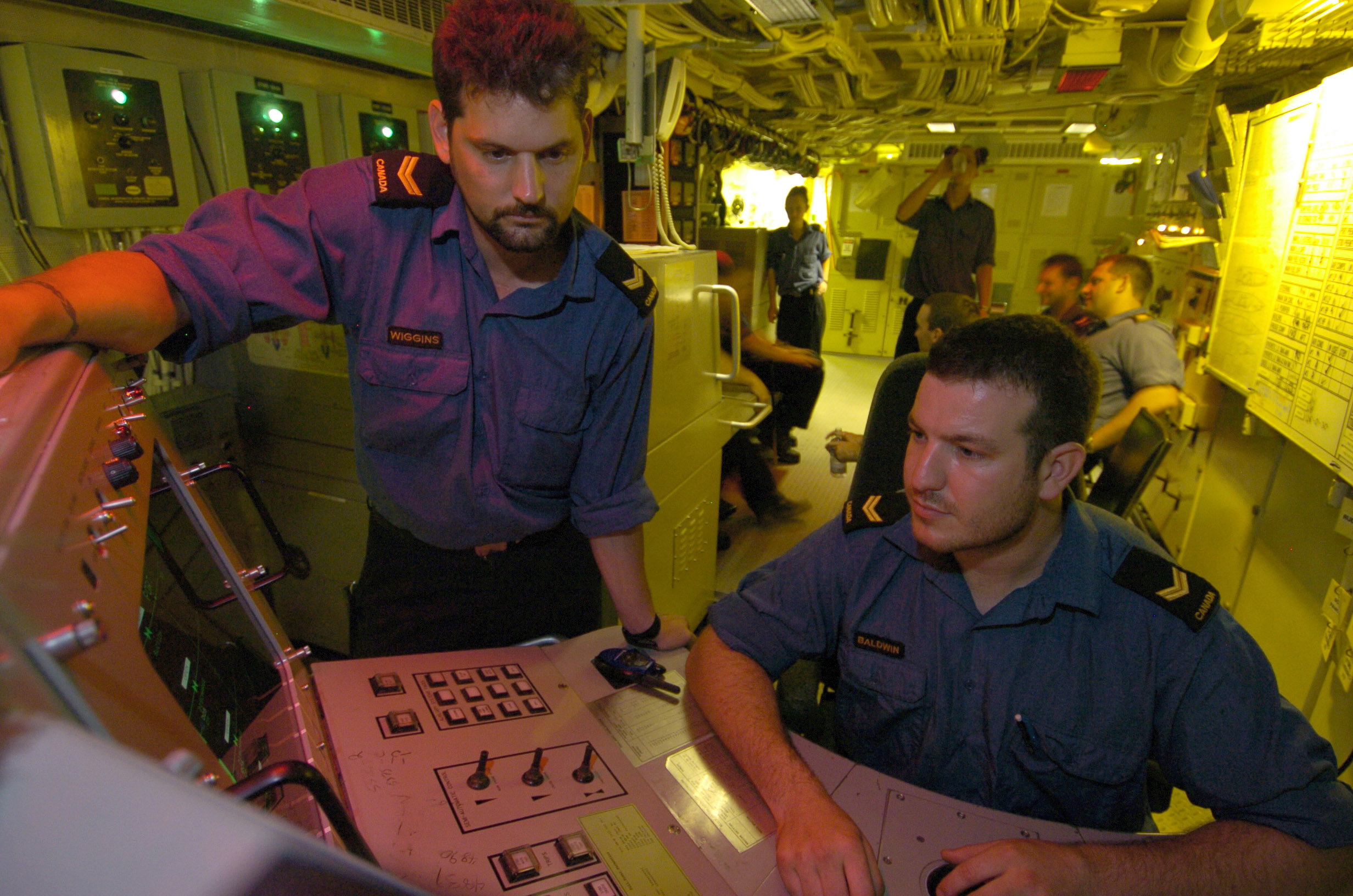
Canadian sailors aboard HMCS Algonquin in Naval Combat Dress

Originally specialized uniforms for wear in an operational theatre, they have now superseded No. 4 uniform for comfortable everyday wear in garrison.

- No. 5 – Navy combat jacket, with beret (or baseball cap), trousers, "high top" sea boots (essentially steel-toed Gore-Tex combat boots), and naval combat shirt.
- No. 5A – Same as above, without naval combat jacket.
- No. 5B – Same as above, however, with naval combat shirt sleeves rolled.
- No. 5C – (no longer authorized) Same as above, with navy blue wool sweater.
- No. 5D – Same as above, however, with naval (dark blue) shorts, socks and sandals. (Tropical uniform)

Ball caps (with unit's name and designator) and berets are authorized for wear with Naval Combat Dress.

== Uniform updates ==
In February 2020 the RCN announced a new Naval Environment Combat Uniform (NECU), which underwent trials and as of 2024 is being issued to personnel. It is a two-piece uniform, consisting of a long-sleeved shirt worn over the standard RCN black tee-shirt, and trousers. Rank insignia is worn on the front centre of the chest attached with Velcro. The member's surname is worn on the right chest and a tape reading "Navy Marine" is worn on the left. A morale patch is worn on a Velcro section on the right upper arm, and the Canadian Naval Ensign and unit patch are worn on a Velcro section on the left upper arm. Issue of the new uniform began in winter 2021 and is on an exchange basis as members turn in worn-out NCD-pattern uniforms.

== See also ==
- Military uniform
- Uniforms of the Canadian Armed Forces
