= Rural Municipality of Wheatlands No. 163 =

Rural municipality in Saskatchewan, Canada

Wheatlands No. 163
- Rural municipality
- Rural Municipality of Wheatlands No. 163

- Location of the RM of Wheatlands No. 163 in Saskatchewan
- Coordinates: 50.453°N 106.192°W
- Country: Canada
- Province: Saskatchewan
- Census division: 7
- SARM division: 2
- Formed: December 13, 1909

Government
  - Reeve: Kurtis Hicks
  - Governing body: RM of Wheatlands No. 163 Council
  - Administrator: Angela Molde
  - Office location: Mortlach

Area (2016)
  - Land: 827.4 km^{2} (319.5 sq mi)

Population (2016)
  - Total: 149
  - Density: 0.2/km^{2} (0.52/sq mi)
- Time zone: CST
  - Summer (DST): CST
- Area codes: 306 and 639

The Rural Municipality of Wheatlands No. 163 (2016 population: 149) is a rural municipality (RM) in the Canadian province of Saskatchewan within Census Division No. 7 and SARM Division No. 2. It is located in the southwest portion of the province.

== History ==
The RM of Wheatlands No. 163 incorporated as a rural municipality on December 13, 1909.

== Demographics ==
Population history (1981–2016)
Year	Pop.	±%
1981	289	—
1986	292	+1.0%
1991	276	−5.5%
1996	226	−18.1%
2001	178	−21.2%
2006	164	−7.9%
2011	149	−9.1%
2016	149	+0.0%
Source: Statistics Canada via Saskatchewan Bureau of Statistics

In the 2021 Census of Population conducted by Statistics Canada, the RM of Wheatlands No. 163 had a population of 157 living in 69 of its 82 total private dwellings, a change of 5.4% from its 2016 population of 149. With a land area of 818.63 km^{2} (316.07 sq mi), it had a population density of 0.2/km^{2} (0.5/sq mi) in 2021.

In the 2016 Census of Population, the RM of Wheatlands No. 163 recorded a population of 149 living in 69 of its 71 total private dwellings, a 0% change from its 2011 population of 149. With a land area of 827.4 km^{2} (319.5 sq mi), it had a population density of 0.2/km^{2} (0.5/sq mi) in 2016.

== Geography ==
The Coteau Hills in the RM taper off to agricultural plains. The burrowing owl (athene cunicularia), an endangered animal, makes its home in this area.

=== Communities and localities ===
The following urban municipalities are surrounded by the RM.

Villages

- Mortlach

The following unincorporated communities are within the RM.

Localities

- Parkbeg

== Government ==
The RM of Wheatlands No. 163 is governed by an elected municipal council and an appointed administrator that meets on the second Wednesday of every month. The reeve of the RM is Kurtis Hicks while its administrator is Angela Molde. The RM's office is located at 108 Rose St. in Mortlach.

== See also ==
- List of rural municipalities in Saskatchewan
