= Rural Municipality of Morse No. 165 =

Rural municipality in Saskatchewan, Canada

Morse No. 165
- Rural municipality
- Rural Municipality of Morse No. 165

- Location of the RM of Morse No. 165 in Saskatchewan
- Coordinates: 50.679°N 107.097°W
- Country: Canada
- Province: Saskatchewan
- Census division: 7
- SARM division: 3
- Formed: December 11, 1911

Government
  - Reeve: Bruce Gall
  - Governing body: RM of Morse No. 165 Council
  - Administrator: Mark Wilson
  - Office location: Morse

Area (2016)
  - Land: 1,244.38 km^{2} (480.46 sq mi)

Population (2016)
  - Total: 427
  - Density: 0.3/km^{2} (0.78/sq mi)
- Time zone: CST
  - Summer (DST): CST
- Area codes: 306 and 639

The Rural Municipality of Morse No. 165 (2016 population: 427) is a rural municipality (RM) in the Canadian province of Saskatchewan within Census Division No. 7 and SARM Division No. 3. It is located in the southwest portion of the province.

== History ==
The RM of Morse No. 165 incorporated as a rural municipality on December 11, 1911.

== Geography ==
Reed Lake is in the RM.

=== Communities and localities ===
The following urban municipalities are surrounded by the RM.

Towns

- Herbert
- Morse

Villages

- Ernfold

The following unincorporated communities are within the RM.

Localities

- Calderbank
- Log Valley
- Glen Kerr
- Gouldtown

== Demographics ==
Population history (1981–2016)
Year	Pop.	±%
1981	751	—
1986	663	−11.7%
1991	556	−16.1%
1996	528	−5.0%
2001	522	−1.1%
2006	435	−16.7%
2011	401	−7.8%
2016	427	+6.5%
Source: Statistics Canada via Saskatchewan Bureau of Statistics

In the 2021 Census of Population conducted by Statistics Canada, the RM of Morse No. 165 had a population of 396 living in 128 of its 151 total private dwellings, a change of −7.3% from its 2016 population of 427. With a land area of 1,232.65 km^{2} (475.93 sq mi), it had a population density of 0.3/km^{2} (0.8/sq mi) in 2021.

In the 2016 Census of Population, the RM of Morse No. 165 recorded a population of 427 living in 134 of its 160 total private dwellings, a 6.5% change from its 2011 population of 401. With a land area of 1,244.38 km^{2} (480.46 sq mi), it had a population density of 0.3/km^{2} (0.9/sq mi) in 2016.

== Government ==
The RM of Morse No. 165 is governed by an elected municipal council and an appointed administrator that meets on the second Tuesday of every month. The reeve of the RM is Bruce Gall while its administrator is Mark Wilson. The RM's office is located in Morse.
