= Caron, Saskatchewan =

Community in Saskatchewan, Canada

Caron
- Hamlet
- Location within Saskatchewan Location within Canada
- Coordinates: 50°27′32″N 105°52′16″W
- Country: Canada
- Province: Saskatchewan
- Census division: 7
- Rural municipality (RM): Caron No. 162
- Time zone: CST
- Area code: 306
- Highways: Highway 1 (TCH) / Highway 643

Caron is a hamlet in Saskatchewan, Canada, located on the south side of the Trans-Canada Highway, 26 kilometres (16 mi) west of Moose Jaw along the course of Thunder Creek.

Caron was originally a Canadian Pacific Railway (CPR) siding in 1882, named after Sir Adolphe Caron, then Canadian Minister for Militia and Defence.

Although associated with the BCATP, RCAF Station Caron was located 3 km (1.9 mi) north-east of Caron. The former station is now the community of Caronport (the name "Caronport" combines "Caron" and "airport"). There is no trace of the former runways or taxiways and the airfield is closed to all traffic. Some of the buildings are now the property of the Briercrest Family of Schools.

== Demographics ==
In the 2021 Census of Population conducted by Statistics Canada, Caron had a population of 199 living in 70 of its 79 total private dwellings, a change of 22.1% from its 2016 population of 163. With a land area of 0.66 km^{2} (0.25 sq mi), it had a population density of 301.5/km^{2} (780.9/sq mi) in 2021.

== Gallery ==
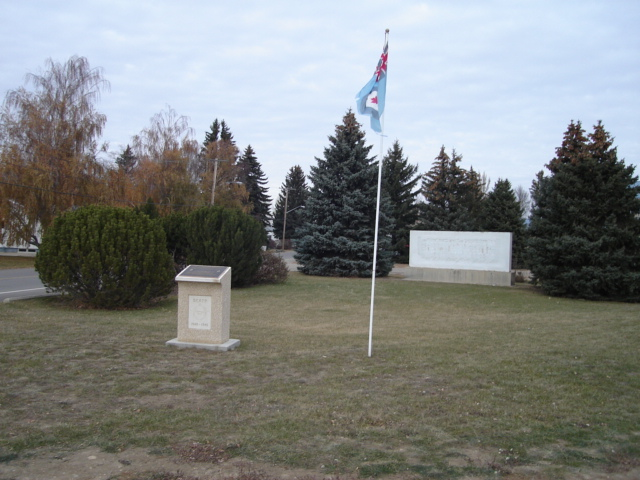
Memorial for the No. 33 Flying School (BCATP), Caronport, SK.

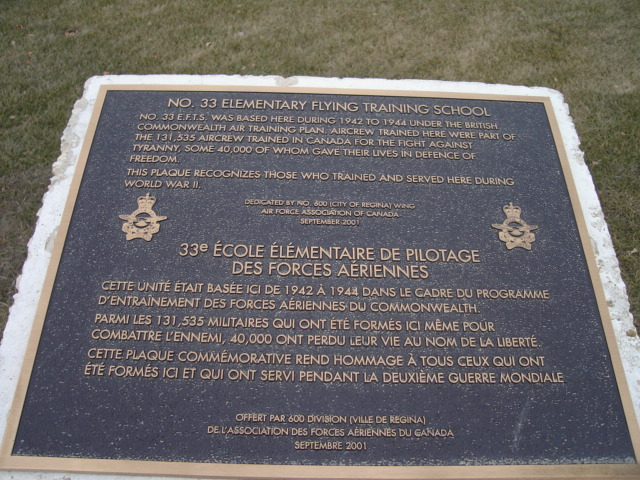
Close-up of the Bronze plaque, Caronport, SK.

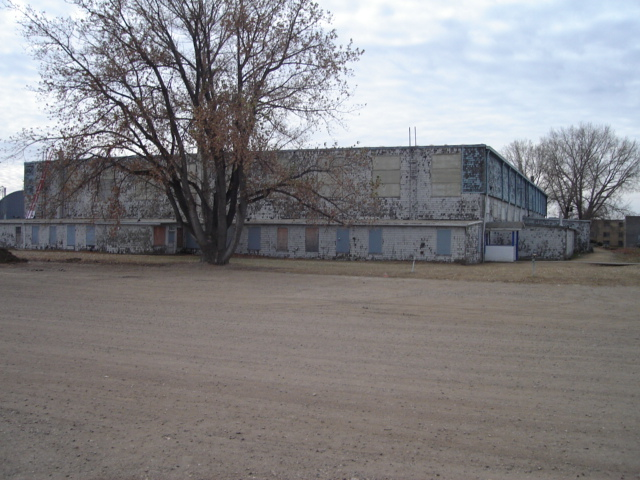
Original aircraft hangar, No. 33 EFTS, Caronport, SK. (Since demolished)

== See also ==
- List of communities in Saskatchewan
