= Waldeck, Saskatchewan =

Village in Saskatchewan, Canada

Waldeck
- Village
- Village of Waldeck
- Location within Excelsior No. 166 Location within Saskatchewan
- Coordinates: 50.358°N 107.597°W
- Country: Canada
- Province: Saskatchewan
- Region: South-central
- Census division: 7
- Rural municipality: Excelsior No. 166
- Founded: 1882
- Post office Founded: 1906-10-01
- Incorporated (Village): December 23, 1913

Government
  - Type: Municipal
  - Governing body: Waldeck Village Council
  - Mayor: Bill Martens
  - Administrator: Sherry Kinney

Area
  - Total: 2.00 km^{2} (0.77 sq mi)

Population (2016)
  - Total: 297
  - Density: 148.3/km^{2} (384/sq mi)
- Time zone: UTC-6 (CST)
- Postal code: S0H 4J0
- Area code: 306
- Highways: Highway 1 Highway 628
- Railways: Canadian Pacific Railway

Waldeck (2016 population: 277) is a village in the Canadian province of Saskatchewan within the Rural Municipality of Excelsior No. 166 and Census Division No. 7. Waldeck is 18 kilometres (11 mi) northeast of the city of Swift Current on the Trans-Canada Highway. Waldeck is situated in the Swift Current River Valley.

== History ==
Waldeck is a German word meaning "Wooded Corner"; the community is probably named after the willows that grew along the banks of the Swift Current Creek.

In 1903 the Canadian Government opened to settlement a tract of land from Swift Current Creek to Herbert. Among the first settlers were Rev. Klaas Peters and Mr. Abraham (probably Abram Klassen) in 1908. Waldeck incorporated as a village on December 23, 1913.

The majority of the people in and around Waldeck are of Mennonite ancestry.

Elon Musk worked on a farm near Waldeck after coming to Canada from South Africa in the late 1980s.

== Demographics ==
Population history (1981–2016)
Year	Pop.	±%
1981	292	—
1986	335	+14.7%
1991	333	−0.6%
1996	335	+0.6%
2001	333	−0.6%
2006	294	−11.7%
2011	297	+1.0%
2016	277	−6.7%
Source: Statistics Canada via Saskatchewan Bureau of Statistics

In the 2021 Census of Population conducted by Statistics Canada, Waldeck had a population of 294 living in 114 of its 119 total private dwellings, a change of 6.1% from its 2016 population of 277. With a land area of 1.99 km^{2} (0.77 sq mi), it had a population density of 147.7/km^{2} (382.6/sq mi) in 2021.

In the 2016 Census of Population, the Village of Waldeck recorded a population of 277 living in 113 of its 117 total private dwellings, a −7.2% change from its 2011 population of 297. With a land area of 2 km^{2} (0.77 sq mi), it had a population density of 138.5/km^{2} (358.7/sq mi) in 2016.

== See also ==
- List of communities in Saskatchewan
- List of villages in Saskatchewan
