= Boharm, Saskatchewan =

Community in Saskatchewan, Canada

Coordinates: 50°23′48″N 106°59′10″W

Location of Boharm in Saskatchewan

Boharm is an unincorporated community in Saskatchewan along the course of Thunder Creek. Located roughly 8 kilometres (5.0 mi) west of the city of Moose Jaw within the Rural Municipality of Moose Jaw No. 161, it lies along both Highway 735 and Canadian Pacific Railway's Swift Current subdivision, with the Trans-Canada Highway (Highway 1) just to the north.

== See also ==
- List of communities in Saskatchewan
