= Oakshela =

Coordinates: 50°24′00″N 102°46′02″W

Oakshela is a hamlet in Saskatchewan, Canada. It was founded in the late 19th century by farmers and quickly became a flourishing small town. It once housed a post office, three stores, a school, a church and several families both within town and just outside town.

It also had a cemetery, which is still used to this date. Oakshela is located approximately 124 km east of Regina just off the #1 Highway, about 25 km south of the Qu'Appelle Valley. Oakshela is no longer the town it once was. In fact, it only qualifies as a hamlet now, though its church still stands, unused, as a marker of what used to exist in this small community.

As recently as 1956, it supported two stores, two gas stations and two grain elevators with approximately 50 residents. As of 2009, all of these were gone, the church abandoned and boarded up with about eight homes but no services. There is a short video posted on YouTube showing the remains of Oakshela in 2009.....sub nom "The Demise of Small Town Saskatchewan".
