= Morse, Saskatchewan =

Town in Saskatchewan, Canada

Morse
- Town
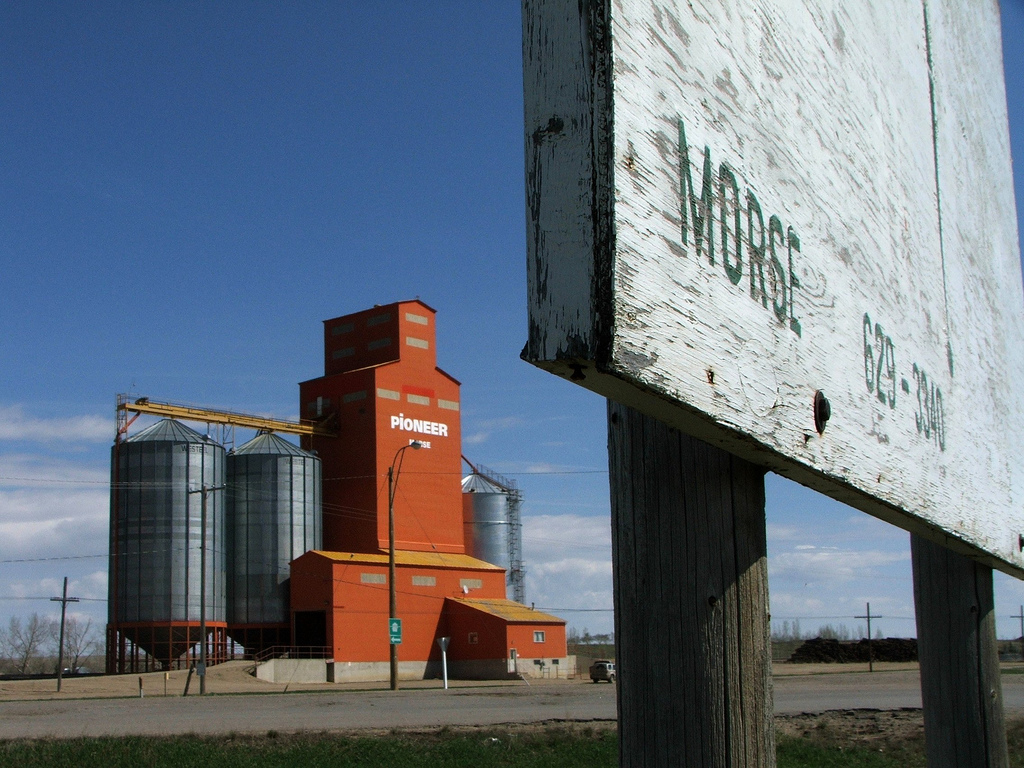
- Morse grain elevator

- Location of Morse in Saskatchewan Morse (Canada)
- Coordinates: 50.414°N 107.032°W
- Country: Canada
- Province: Saskatchewan
- Census division: 7
- Rural Municipality: Morse
- Settled: 1902
- Incorporated (village): 1910
- Incorporated (town): 1912

Government
  - Mayor: Rocky Penner
  - Town Manager: Tamara Knight
  - Governing body: Morse Town Council

Area
  - Total: 1.45 km^{2} (0.56 sq mi)

Population (2011)
  - Total: 240
  - Density: 165.7/km^{2} (429/sq mi)
- Time zone: CST
- Postal code: S0H 3C0
- Area code: 306
- Highways: Trans Canada Highway
- Website: Official website

Morse is a town in southern Saskatchewan, Canada. It is situated on the Trans Canada Highway near the north shore of Reed Lake. The town is named after the western Superintendent of the Canadian Pacific Railroad at the time.

== Demographics ==
In the 2021 Census of Population conducted by Statistics Canada, Morse had a population of 216 living in 116 of its 152 total private dwellings, a change of −10.7% from its 2016 population of 242. With a land area of 1.54 km^{2} (0.59 sq mi), it had a population density of 140.3/km^{2} (363.3/sq mi) in 2021.

== See also ==
- List of communities in Saskatchewan
- List of francophone communities in Saskatchewan
- List of towns in Saskatchewan
