= Herbert, Saskatchewan =

Town in Saskatchewan, Canada

Herbert
- Town
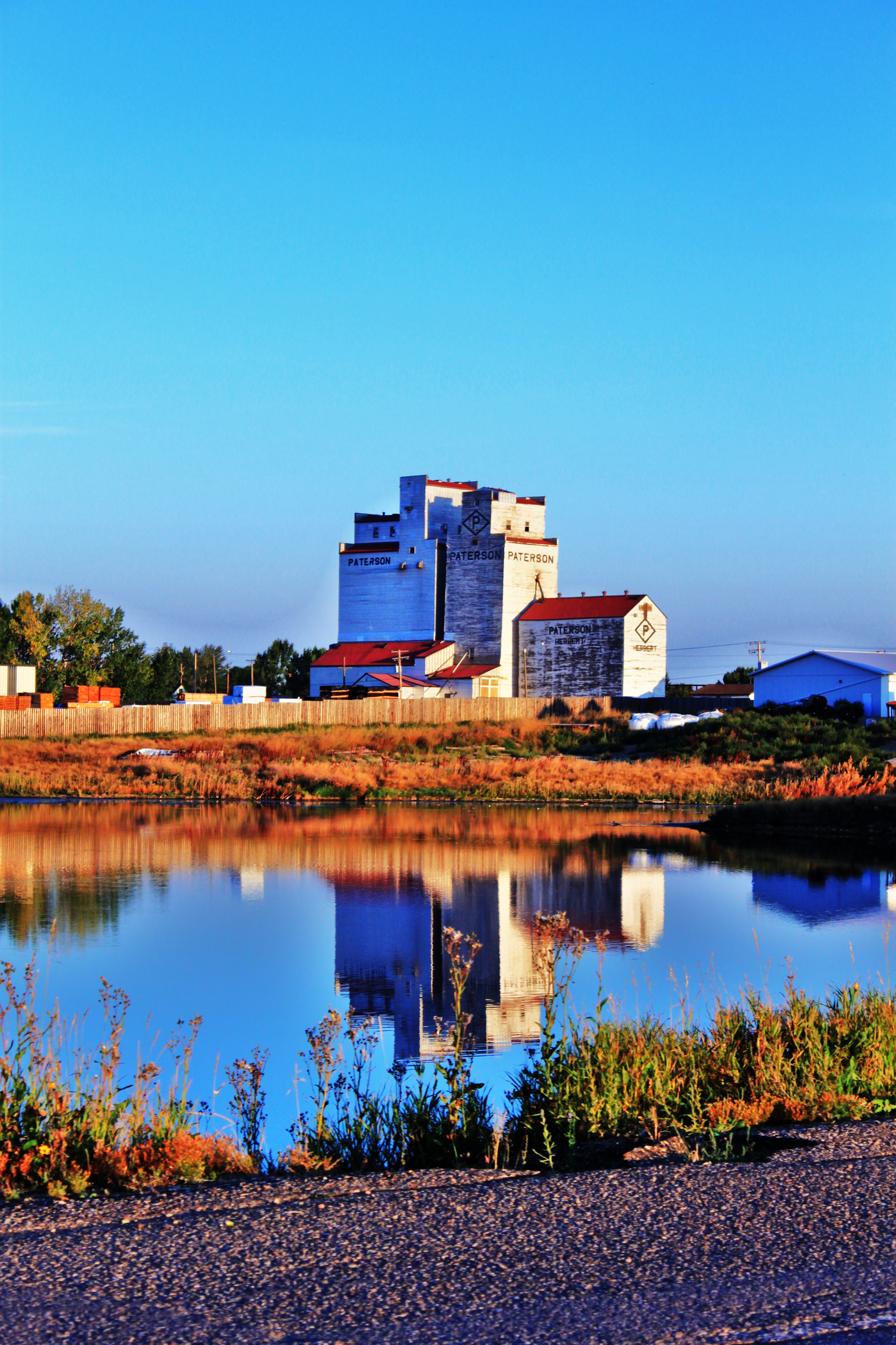
- Early morning light on the grain elevators in Herbert.
- Motto: Have you seen Herbert?
- Location of Herbert in Saskatchewan Herbert (Canada)
- Coordinates: 50.42728°N 107.22781°W
- Country: Canada
- Province: Saskatchewan
- Census division: 7
- Rural Municipality: Morse
- Post office Founded: 1904-10-01

Government
  - Mayor: Ron Mathies
  - CAO: Michelle Mackow
  - Governing body: Herbert Town Council

Area
  - Land: 3.69 km^{2} (1.42 sq mi)

Population (2021)
  - Total: 770
  - Density: 208.6/km^{2} (540/sq mi)
- Time zone: CST
- Postal code: S0H 2A0
- Area code: 306
- Highways: Highway 1 (TCH) / Highway 612 / Highway 645
- Railways: Canadian Pacific Railway
- Website: Official website

Herbert is a town in the Rural Municipality of Morse No. 165, in southwest Saskatchewan, Canada. The community is 48 km east of the city of Swift Current, and 197 km west of Regina, the provincial capital, on the Trans-Canada Highway. Its population as of 2021 was 770.

Herbert was named after the British diplomat Sir Michael Henry Herbert. It is the hometown of CBC Sports broadcaster Don Wittman. Herbert was also the home of former senator Jack Wiebe.

== Attractions ==
The Herbert Train Station Museum provides historical information about the town of Herbert and operates during the summer months. The Klassen Museum (c. 1916) was a Municipal Heritage Property on the Canadian Register of Historic Places.

== Education ==
Herbert School offers kindergarten to grade 12 and is in the Chinook School Division 211

== Recreation ==
Herbert has a skating rink and a curling rink, a swimming pool, a number of ball diamonds, and a gym within the school.

Herbert is also home to the Herbert Stampede, a Canadian Cowboys Association approved Rodeo. Herbert Stampede was the CCA's 2008 and 2014 Rodeo of the year. The Herbert Stampede features a Wild Cow Race and The Wild West Parade.

== Amenities ==
Herbert has an independent grocery store, co-operative gas bar and restaurants. The town also comprises a post office, public library, credit union and thrift store. Lodging is available at a local motel and campground. Healthcare facilities consist of a hospital, a pharmacy, a nursing home, and senior living complexes.

== Demographics ==
In the 2021 Census of Population conducted by Statistics Canada, Herbert had a population of 770 living in 313 of its 338 total private dwellings, a change of −10% from its 2016 population of 856. With a land area of 3.69 km^{2} (1.42 sq mi), it had a population density of 208.7/km^{2} (540.5/sq mi) in 2021.

Canada census – Herbert community profile

	2021	2016	2011
Population	770 (-10.0% from 2016)	856 (+12.8% from 2011)	759 (+8.4% from 2006)
Land area	3.69 km^{2} (1.42 sq mi)	3.78 km^{2} (1.46 sq mi)	+2.3 km^{2} (0.89 sq mi)
Population density	208.6/km^{2} (540/sq mi)	226.3/km^{2} (586/sq mi)	200.7/km^{2} (520/sq mi)
Median age	49.6 (M: 48.8, F: 49.6)	46.8 (M: 46.0, F: 47.4)	57.6 (M: 56.8, F: 59.0)
Private dwellings	338 (total) 313 (occupied)	356 (total)	323 (total)
Median household income	$60,400

References: 2021 2016 2011

== See also ==
- List of communities in Saskatchewan
- List of towns in Saskatchewan
