= Melville-Saltcoats =

Provincial electoral district in Saskatchewan, Canada

Coordinates: 50°50′N 102°15′W

Saskatchewan electoral district

Provincial electoral district
- Legislature: Legislative Assembly of Saskatchewan
MLA
Warren Kaeding
Saskatchewan
- District created: 2002
- First contested: 2003
- Last contested: 2024

Demographics
- Electors: 9,131
- Census division(s): Division 5, 9
- Census subdivision: Melville

Melville-Saltcoats is a provincial electoral district for the Legislative Assembly of Saskatchewan, Canada. Located in southeastern Saskatchewan, this constituency was created through the Representation Act, 1994 (Saskatchewan) by combining the district of Saltcoats with part of the constituency of Melville.

The largest centre in the riding is the city of Melville (pop. 4,531). Melville is the smallest incorporated city in Saskatchewan. It is also a major transportation hub, with provincial Highways 10, 15, and 47 running through the city – as well as the Canadian National Railway mainline.

Smaller centres in the district include the towns of Langenburg, Esterhazy, Saltcoats and Churchbridge; and the villages of Calder, Grayson, Spy Hill, Neudorf and Stockholm.

== Members of the Legislative Assembly ==
Legislature	Years	Member	Party
25th	2003 – 2007	Bob Bjornerud	Saskatchewan Party
26th	2007 – 2011	Bob Bjornerud	Saskatchewan Party
27th	2011 – 2016	Bob Bjornerud	Saskatchewan Party
28th	2016 – 2020	Warren Kaeding	Saskatchewan Party
29th	2020 – 2024	Warren Kaeding	Saskatchewan Party
29th	2024 – present	Warren Kaeding	Saskatchewan Party

== Election results ==
2024 Saskatchewan general election
Party	Candidate	Votes	%	±%
Saskatchewan	Warren Kaeding	5,182	65.19	-10.75
New Democratic	Karen Hovind	1,945	24.47	+6.90
Saskatchewan United	Curtis Brooks	620	7.80	-
Green	Micah Mang	86	1.08	-0.85
Buffalo	Frank Serfas	72	0.91	-
Total valid votes		7,905	99.45	
Total rejected ballots		44	0.55	–
Turnout		7,949	–	–
Eligible voters		–		
Saskatchewan hold		Swing		–
Source: Elections Saskatchewan

2020 Saskatchewan general election
Party	Candidate	Votes	%	±%
Saskatchewan	Warren Kaeding	5,394	75.94	+3.20
New Democratic	Bonnie Galenzoski	1,248	17.57	-4.27
Progressive Conservative	Trever Ratti	324	4.56	+1.94
Green	Jack Powless	137	1.93	-
Total valid votes		7,103	99.59	
Total rejected ballots		29	0.41	–
Turnout		7,132	–	–
Eligible voters		–		
Saskatchewan hold		Swing		–
Source: Elections Saskatchewan

2016 Saskatchewan general election
Party	Candidate	Votes	%	±%
Saskatchewan	Warren Kaeding	5,311	72.74	-0.72
New Democratic	Leonard Dales	1,595	21.84	-2.63
Progressive Conservative	Diana Lowe	192	2.62	–
Liberal	Igor Riabchyk	138	1.89	-
Independent	Trever Ratti	65	0.89	-
Total valid votes		7,301	100.0	
Eligible voters		–		
Source: Elections Saskatchewan

2011 Saskatchewan general election
Party	Candidate	Votes	%	±%
Saskatchewan	Bob Bjornerud	5,071	73.45%	+11.18
New Democratic	Len Dales	1,690	24.48%	−7.34
Green	Jordan Fieseler	143	2.07%	–
Total		6,904	100.00%	

2007 Saskatchewan general election
Party	Candidate	Votes	%	±%
Saskatchewan	Bob Bjornerud	5,039	62.28%	+23.24
New Democratic	Marlys Knezacek	2,574	31.81%	−0.36
Liberal	Henry Farmer	375	4.64%	−5.31
Western Independence	Frank Serfas	103	1.27%	–
Total		8,091	100.00%	

2003 Saskatchewan general election
Party	Candidate	Votes	%
Saskatchewan	Bob Bjornerud	3,439	39.04%
New Democratic	Ron Osika	2,834	32.17%
Independent	Grant Schmidt	1,660	18.84%
Liberal	Brian Tochor	877	9.95%
Total		8,810	100.00%

== History ==
=== Members of the Legislative Assembly – Melville ===
#	MLA	Served	Party
1.	James Garfield Gardiner	1934–1935	Liberal
2.	Ernest Walter Gerrand	1935–1938	Liberal
3.	John Frederick Herman	1938–1944	Social Credit
4.	William James Arthurs	1944–1948	CCF
5.	V. Patrick Deshaye	1948–1952	Liberal
6.	Allan Brown	1952–1956	CCF
7.	James W. Gardiner	1956–1967	Liberal
8.	John Kowalchuk	1967–1982	New Democrat
9.	Grant Schmidt	1982–1991	Progressive Conservative
10.	Evan Carlson	1991–1995	New Democrat
11.	Ron Osika	1995–2001	Liberal
12.	Ron Osika	2001–2003	Independent

=== Members of the Legislative Assembly – Saltcoats (1905–1934) ===
#	MLA	Served	Party
1.	Thomas MacNutt	1905–1908	Liberal
2.	James Alexander Calder	1908–1917	Liberal
3.	George William Sahlmark	1918–1929	Liberal
4.	Asmundur Loptson	1929–1934	Liberal

=== Members of the Legislative Assembly – Saltcoats (1938–2003) ===
#	MLA	Served	Party
1.	Joseph Lee Phelps	1938–1948	CCF
2.	Asmundur Loptson	1948–1960	Liberal
3.	James Snedker	1960–1971	Liberal
4.	Ed Kaeding	1971–1982	New Democrat
5.	Walter Johnson	1982–1991	Progressive Conservative
6.	Reg Knezacek	1991–1995	New Democrat
7.	Bob Bjornerud	1995–1997	Liberal
8.	Bob Bjornerud	1997–2003	Saskatchewan Party

== See also ==
- List of Saskatchewan provincial electoral districts
- List of Saskatchewan general elections
- Canadian provincial electoral districts
