= Saltcoats (disambiguation) =

Saltcoats is a town in North Ayrshire, Scotland.

Saltcoats may also refer to:

- in Canada:
  - Rural Municipality of Saltcoats No. 213, Saskatchewan
    - Saltcoats, Saskatchewan, a community of Saskatchewan
  - Saltcoats (federal electoral district), a former federal electoral district in Saskatchewan
  - Saltcoats (provincial electoral district), a former provincial electoral district in Saskatchewan
- in the United Kingdom:
  - Saltcoats, North Ayrshire, Scotland
  - Saltcoats, Cumbria, England
  - Saltcoats, East Lothian, Scotland, Saltcoats Castle is nearby
