= Bredenbury, Saskatchewan =

Town in Saskatchewan, Canada

Bredenbury
- Town
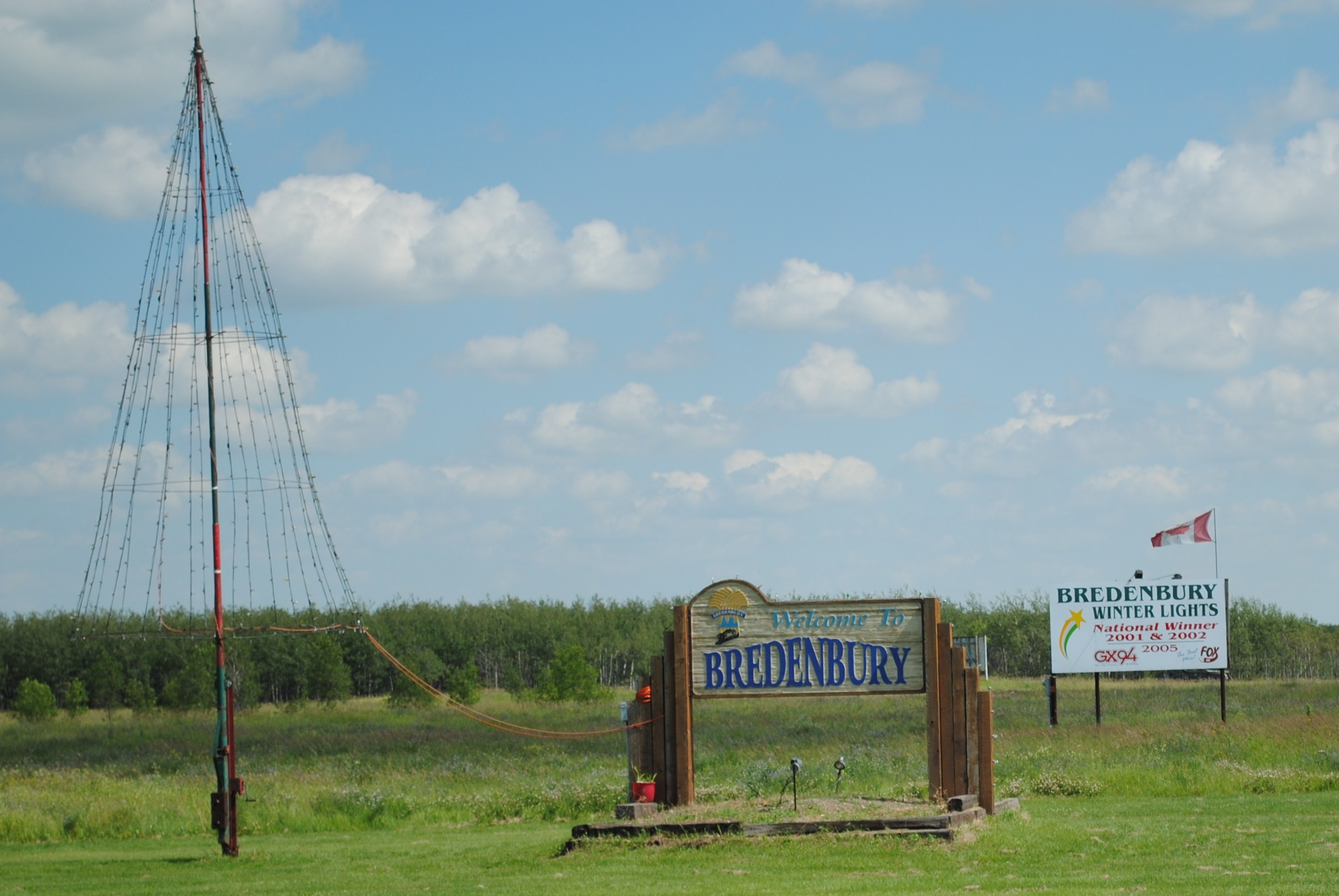
- Signs and Christmas tree at the eastern entrance to Bredenbury, SK off Highway 16.

- Location within Saskatchewan
- Coordinates: 50°56′29″N 102°2′39″W
- Country: Canada
- Province: Saskatchewan
- Rural Municipality: Rural Municipality of Saltcoats No. 213
- Established: 1905

Government
  - Mayor: Jonas St. Marie
  - Governing Body: Bredenbury Town Council: Terry Kitzul; Ken Morrison; Russell Slowski; Jonas St.Marie
  - Federal Electoral District M.P.: Gary Breitkreuz
  - Provincial Constituency M.L.A.: Bob Bjornerud
- Time zone: CST
- Highways: Highway 16 (TCH/YH) / Highway 637
- Website: Town of Bredenbury

Bredenbury is a town in the Rural Municipality of Saltcoats No. 213, in the Canadian province of Saskatchewan. Bredenbury is located on Highway 16 in eastern Saskatchewan. As of the 2016 Canadian Census, the population of Bredenbury was 372. The main industries in the area are farming and potash mining near Esterhazy. The community is known in the area for its enthusiastic Christmas light displays which have won national awards.

== History ==
Bredenbury received a post office in 1890 and was incorporated in 1913. The town was named for Bredenbury Court, located near Bredenbury, Herefordshire. The court was the manor home of William Henry Barneby, who traveled three times (in 1881, 1883, 1888) to western Canada and wrote books about his experiences.

== Geography ==
Bredenbury is located on the Yellowhead Highway (Highway 16). It is 41 kilometres southeast of Yorkton and 50 km west of the Manitoba border. Bredenbury is approximately 2.5 hours from Regina and four hours from Winnipeg. The surrounding land is mainly used for agriculture and ranching. Highway 637 also comes into the town from the south.

== Economy ==
Bredenbury has an economy based largely on agriculture, potash mining and the railway, along with their supporting businesses. A CPR main line runs through the town. There are railway car cleaning and fertilizer plants in Bredenbury as well.

== Demographics ==
In the 2021 Census of Population conducted by Statistics Canada, Bredenbury had a population of 386 living in 157 of its 177 total private dwellings, a change of 3.8% from its 2016 population of 372. With a land area of 4.61 km^{2} (1.78 sq mi), it had a population density of 83.7/km^{2} (216.9/sq mi) in 2021.

== Education ==
There are no public schools in Bredenbury itself. Students are bussed to Saltcoats for elementary school and to Yorkton for high school. Bredenbury Elementary School closed in 2001. The school building in the town is currently empty. The Mennonites operate a private parochial school: the Countryside School.

== Christmas lights ==
Christmas in Bredenbury started out relatively small with a single street that dubbed itself 'Candy Cane Lane' and sported matching red and white candy canes down the length of the entire street. In subsequent years, the rest of the town has caught that same spirit, and the town is home to a special 'Light Up' ceremony at the beginning of December each year, along with elaborate displays at private homes, businesses and empty lots throughout the town.

Bredenbury has won the national WinterLights competition for communities with populations under 1,000 in 2001, 2002 and 2005. As a result of the community involvement with the Christmas celebrations, Bredenbury has hosted the CPR Holiday Train, with performers such as Tom Jackson. Bredenbury hosted the Holiday Train again in 2007, when the featured performers were Wide Mouth Mason and Melanie Doane.

== Sports and recreation ==
- Bredenbury Cougars - Triangle Hockey League (Senior Men's)
- Bredenbury Golf Course - a nine-hole golf course with artificial greens, maintained by local volunteers.

== Published works ==
- Bredenbury Senior Citizens (1978), Memory Lane: A Local History of Bredenbury and Districts, Bredenbury, Sask: Bredenbury History Book Committee, p. 164, ISBN 0-88925-028-6

== See also ==
- List of communities in Saskatchewan
- List of rural municipalities in Saskatchewan
