= Bob Bjornerud =

Canadian provincial politician

The Honourable Bob Bjornerud ECS

Member of the Saskatchewan Legislative Assembly for Melville-Saltcoats Saltcoats (1995-2003)
- In office June 21, 1995 – April 4, 2016
- Preceded by: Reg Knezacek
- Succeeded by: Warren Kaeding

Personal details
- Born: September 8, 1945 (age 80) Kelvington, Saskatchewan, Canada
- Party: Liberal → Saskatchewan Party
- Occupation: farmer

Bob Bjornerud (born September 8, 1945) is a Canadian provincial politician. He was the member of the Legislative Assembly of Saskatchewan for the constituency of Melville-Saltcoats from 1995 to 2016, first as a member of the Liberal Party and later as a member of the Saskatchewan Party. Bjornerud served as the Minister of Agriculture from 2007 to 2012, when he requested not to be considered for a cabinet post in the next cabinet shuffle. Bjornerud did not seek re-election in the 2016 Saskatchewan general election.

== Election results ==
1995 Saskatchewan general election: Saltcoats
Party	Candidate	Votes	%	±%
Liberal	Bob Bjornerud	3,635	45.53%	+31.05
New Democratic	Reg Knezacek	3,053	38.25%	−14.24
Progressive Conservative	Ken Johnson	1,295	16.22%	−16.81
Total		7,983	100.00%	

1999 Saskatchewan general election: Saltcoats
Party	Candidate	Votes	%	±%
Saskatchewan	Bob Bjornerud	4,688	62.47%	—
New Democratic	Leo Fuhr	1,884	25.10%	−13.15
Liberal	Vic Polsom	933	12.43%	−33.10
Total		7,505	100.00%	

2003 Saskatchewan general election: Melville-Saltcoats
Party	Candidate	Votes	%
Saskatchewan	Bob Bjornerud	3,439	39.04%
New Democratic	Ron Osika	2,834	32.17%
Independent	Grant Schmidt	1,660	18.84%
Liberal	Brian Tochor	877	9.95%
Total		8,810	100.00%

2007 Saskatchewan general election: Melville-Saltcoats
Party	Candidate	Votes	%	±%
Saskatchewan	Bob Bjornerud	5,039	62.28%	+23.24
New Democratic	Marlys Knezacek	2,574	31.81%	−0.36
Liberal	Henry Farmer	375	4.64%	−5.31
Western Independence	Frank Serfas	103	1.27%	–
Total		8,091	100.00%	

2011 Saskatchewan general election: Melville-Saltcoats
Party	Candidate	Votes	%	±%
Saskatchewan	Bob Bjornerud	5,071	73.45%	+11.18
New Democratic	Len Dales	1,690	24.48%	−7.34
Green	Jordan Fieseler	143	2.07%	–
Total		6,904	100.00%	

=== Cabinet positions ===
Saskatchewan provincial government of Brad Wall
Cabinet post (1)
Predecessor	Office	Successor
Mark Wartman	Minister of Agriculture; November 21, 2007–May 25, 2012	Lyle Stewart
