= Melville (provincial electoral district) =

Former provincial electoral district in Saskatchewan, Canada

Coordinates: 50°52′N 103°10′W

Melville was a provincial electoral district for the Legislative Assembly of Saskatchewan, Canada. Located in southeastern Saskatchewan, this constituency was created before the 8th Saskatchewan general election in 1934. The Representation Act, 2002 (Saskatchewan) merged this riding with parts of the Saltcoats electoral district to form the new riding of Melville-Saltcoats.

It was the riding of Premier James Garfield Gardiner and his son James Wilfrid Gardiner.

== Members of the Legislative Assembly ==
#	MLA	Served	Party
1.	James Garfield Gardiner	1934–1935	Liberal
2.	Ernest Walter Gerrand	1935–1938	Liberal
3.	John Frederick Herman	1938–1944	Social Credit
4.	William James Arthurs	1944–1948	CCF
5.	Patrick Deshaye	1948–1952	Liberal
6.	Allan Brown	1952–1956	CCF
7.	James W. Gardiner	1956–1967	Liberal
8.	John Kowalchuk	1967–1982	New Democrat
9.	Grant Schmidt	1982–1991	Progressive Conservative
10.	Evan Carlson	1991–1995	New Democrat
11.	Ron Osika	1995–2001	Liberal
12.	Ron Osika	2001–2003	Independent

== Election results ==
1934 Saskatchewan general election: Melville
Party	Candidate	Votes	%	±%
Liberal	James Garfield Gardiner	4,983	59.20%	–
Conservative	Elisha Forest Scharf	1,930	22.93%	–
Farmer-Labour	Wilfrid Wass	1,504	17.87%	–
Total		8,417	100.00%	

December 9, 1935 By-Election: Melville
Party	Candidate	Votes	%	±%
Liberal	Ernest Walter Gerrand	Acclaimed	100.00%	
Total		Acclamation		

1938 Saskatchewan general election: Melville
Party	Candidate	Votes	%	±%
Social Credit	John Frederick Herman	5,100	50.05%	–
Liberal	Charles Morton Dunn	5,089	49.95%	-
Total		10,189	100.00%	

1944 Saskatchewan general election: Melville
Party	Candidate	Votes	%	±%
CCF	William James Arthurs	4,575	50.78%	–
Liberal	Lionel Stillborn	3,614	40.11%	-9.84
Prog. Conservative	Shamus Patrick Regan	821	9.11%	-
Total		9,010	100.00%	

1948 Saskatchewan general election: Melville
Party	Candidate	Votes	%	±%
Liberal	Patrick Deshaye	5,302	48.18%	+8.07
CCF	George T. Webster	4,690	42.61%	-8.17
Social Credit	John W. Hauser	1,014	9.21%	-
Total		11,006	100.00%	

1952 Saskatchewan general election: Melville
Party	Candidate	Votes	%	±%
CCF	Allan Brown	4,578	46.29%	+3.68
Liberal	Patrick Deshaye	4,408	44.58%	-3.60
Social Credit	L.E. Obenauer	903	9.13%	-0.08
Total		9,889	100.00%	

1956 Saskatchewan general election: Melville
Party	Candidate	Votes	%	±%
Liberal	James W. Gardiner	3,946	41.25%	-3.33
CCF	Allan Brown	3,808	39.81%	-4.77
Social Credit	R.S. Dohms	1,622	16.96%	+7.83
Prog. Conservative	Gordon C. Peters	189	1.98%	-
Total		9,565	100.00%	

1960 Saskatchewan general election: Melville
Party	Candidate	Votes	%	±%
Liberal	James W. Gardiner	3,687	41.45%	+0.20
CCF	Joseph Elfenbaum	3,411	38.35%	-1.46
Social Credit	Charles Campagne	916	10.30%	-6.66
Prog. Conservative	Maurice Tallant	881	9.90%	+7.92
Total		8,895	100.00%	

1964 Saskatchewan general election: Melville
Party	Candidate	Votes	%	±%
Liberal	James W. Gardiner	3,485	41.78%	+0.33
CCF	William Wiwchar	3,229	38.71%	+0.36
Prog. Conservative	Douglas A. Ellis	1,627	19.51%	+9.61
Total		8,341	100.00%	

1967 Saskatchewan general election: Melville
Party	Candidate	Votes	%	±%
NDP	John Kowalchuk	3,584	45.68%	+6.97
Liberal	James W. Gardiner	3,463	44.14%	+2.36
Prog. Conservative	Art Pelzer	799	10.18%	-9.33
Total		7,846	100.00%	

1971 Saskatchewan general election: Melville
Party	Candidate	Votes	%	±%
NDP	John Kowalchuk	4,184	59.60%	+13.92
Liberal	Robert E. Greenfield	2,836	40.40%	-3.74
Total		7,020	100.00%	

1975 Saskatchewan general election: Melville
Party	Candidate	Votes	%	±%
NDP	John Kowalchuk	3,747	45.45%	-14.15
Prog. Conservative	Glenn Miller	2,478	30.06%	-
Liberal	Joseph L. Sedlovitch	2,019	24.49%	-15.91
Total		8,244	100.00%	

1978 Saskatchewan general election: Melville
Party	Candidate	Votes	%	±%
NDP	John Kowalchuk	4,072	48.26%	+2.81
Prog. Conservative	Glenn Miller	3,465	41.06%	+11.00
Liberal	Cecil Headrick	901	10.68%	-13.81
Total		8,438	100.00%	

1982 Saskatchewan general election: Melville
Party	Candidate	Votes	%	±%
Prog. Conservative	Grant Schmidt	4,172	47.57%	+6.51
NDP	Pat Krug	3,486	39.75%	-8.51
Liberal	Jack Hanowski	627	7.15%	-3.53
Western Canada Concept	Raymond Miller	421	4.80%	–
Aboriginal People's	Harry Bird	64	0.73%	–
Total		8,770	100.00%	

1986 Saskatchewan general election: Melville
Party	Candidate	Votes	%	±%
Prog. Conservative	Grant Schmidt	4,575	53.46%	+5.89
NDP	Matt Stecyk	3,302	38.59%	-1.16
Liberal	Mona Kines	643	7.51%	+0.36
Alliance	Arthur J. Pelzer	38	0.44%	
Total		8,558	100.00%	

1991 Saskatchewan general election: Melville
Party	Candidate	Votes	%	±%
NDP	Evan Carlson	3,656	45.90%	+7.31
Prog. Conservative	Grant Schmidt	3,048	38.26%	-15.20
Liberal	Ray Chastkavich	1,262	15.84%	+8.33
Total		7,966	100.00%	

1995 Saskatchewan general election: Melville
Party	Candidate	Votes	%	±%
Liberal	Ron Osika	3,274	41.89%	+26.05
NDP	Evan Carlson	2,975	38.07%	-7.83
Prog. Conservative	Doug Gattinger	1,566	20.04%	-18.22
Total		7,815	100.00%	

1999 Saskatchewan general election: Melville
Party	Candidate	Votes	%	±%
Liberal	Ron Osika	3,419	44.75%	+2.86
Saskatchewan	Garry P. Hoffman	2,165	28.34%	–
NDP	Michael K. Fisher	2,056	26.91%	-11.16
Total		7,640	100.00%	

== See also ==
- List of Saskatchewan provincial electoral districts
- List of Saskatchewan general elections
- Canadian provincial electoral districts
- Melville, Saskatchewan
