= Joseph Phelps =

Joseph or Joe Phelps may refer to:

- Joseph Phelps (Australian politician) (died 1890)
- Joseph Lee Phelps (1899–1983), Saskatchewan, Canada politician
- Joe D. Phelps (born 1949), founder and chairman of the Getting Better Foundation
