= List of members of the Canadian House of Commons with military service (O) =

| Name | Elected party | Constituency | Elected date | Military service |
|---|---|---|---|---|
| William O'Brien | Conservative | Muskoka and Parry Sound | June 20, 1882 | Militia (1885) |
| Martin Patrick O'Connell | Liberal | Scarborough East | June 25, 1968 | Canadian Forces Land Force Command |
| Gordon O'Connor | Conservative | Carleton—Lanark | June 28, 2004 | Canadian Forces Land Force Command |
| John Francis O'Reilly | Liberal | Victoria—Haliburton | October 25, 1993 | Canadian Army (1955-1957) |
| Horace Andrew "Bud" Olson | Social Credit | Medicine Hat | June 10, 1957 | Canadian Army |
| John Martin Oostrom | Progressive Conservative | Willowdale | September 4, 1984 | Royal Netherlands Air Force (1950-1951) |
| Robert Orange | Liberal | Northwest Territories | November 8, 1965 | Royal Navy (1945) |
| James Norris Ormiston | Progressive Conservative | Melville | March 31, 1958 | Canadian Army (1939-1946) |
| Edmund Boyd Osler | Liberal | Winnipeg South Centre | June 25, 1968 | Royal Canadian Air Force (1940-1945) |
| Joseph-Aldric Ouimet | Liberal-Conservative | Laval | October 28, 1873 | Militia |
