= Thomas MacNutt =

Canadian politician

Thomas MacNutt MP, MLA

Member of Parliament for Saltcoats
- In office 1908–1921
- Preceded by: none
- Succeeded by: Thomas Sales

MLA for Saltcoats
- In office 1905–1908
- Preceded by: none
- Succeeded by: James Alexander Calder

1st Speaker of the Legislative Assembly of Saskatchewan
- In office March 29, 1906 – July 20, 1908
- Preceded by: None. First Speaker.
- Succeeded by: William Charles Sutherland

Personal details
- Born: August 3, 1850 Campbellton, New Brunswick, British North America
- Died: February 7, 1927 (aged 76)
- Party: Saskatchewan Liberal Party Liberal Party of Canada, Independent party
- Spouse: Miss Margaret McFayden
- Profession: Farmer and stock raiser

Thomas MacNutt (August 3, 1850 – February 5, 1927) was a Canadian politician who held national as well as province-wide office, as a former member of the House of Commons of Canada and the Legislative Assembly of Saskatchewan. He won a number of significant recognized awards and honours in his career. Thomas MacNutt was one of the original eight people who comprised the Independent party, the precursor to the Progressive Party of Canada.

== Early life and family ==
MacNutt was born in Eastern Canada in Campbellton, New Brunswick, on August 3, 1850, to Charles Stewart MacNutt and Emily Allison (née Sims) MacNutt. Thomas MacNutt attended elementary school on Prince Edward Island, and thereafter attended Ottawa grammar school and commercial college. Thomas MacNutt completed his schooling and served in the military as well as timber agent, surveyor, Indian agent, and colonization agent before entering politics. Many early immigrants felt that Thomas MacNutt was guide, and friend.

Upon marrying Miss Margaret McFayden, Thomas and Margaret started a family in the Saltcoats area of Saskatchewan. Four children made up their family, Charles Arthur Macnutt, Thomas Russell MacNutt, Mary Lamont MacNutt, and Everett Alexander MacNutt.

== Military service ==
- In 1866, Thomas MacNutt served with the Ottawa Rifles in the Cornwall Fenian raids or "Irish Invasion of Canada".
- In 1885, Thomas MacNutt served with the Minnedosa Home Guards during the North-West Rebellion.

== Politics ==
MacNutt was a member of the Territorial Assembly from 1902 until 1905. He was then a member of the Saltcoats constituency when he was the first Speaker of the Legislative Assembly of Saskatchewan in 1906. As a Speaker, the office required knowledge of the rules of the house and impartiality. He continued on in politics, becoming a member of the House of Commons at Ottawa, Ontario, from 1908 until 1921. MacNutt entered politics as a Liberal Party of Saskatchewan supporter until 1917. He was elected in the 1905 Saskatchewan election as a Member of the Legislative Assembly (MLA) representing Saltcoats. He served with Premier Walter Scott of the Liberal Party. He resigned as MLA and served as a Member of Parliament (MP). He served in the House of Commons after the 1908 federal election, and represented the federal Saltcoats district. After the 1908 Saskatchewan election, MacNutt again represented the provincial Saltcoats and served with Premier Walter Scott. MacNutt subsequently won the 1911 and the 1917 federal elections in Saltcoats. The Unionist Party was formed in 1917 by Members of Parliament who supported the "Union government" formed by Sir Robert Borden during World War I. MacNutt was a Liberal-Unionist between 1917 and 1920. There were eight who came together to form the Independent party which later became known as the Progressive Party of Canada.

== Awards ==
The early Saskatchewan District of Landestreu was named in honour of the Honorable Thomas MacNutt Esq., and is now known as MacNutt

- The May 1935 Jubilee medal was issued to commemorate the twenty-fifth year of the reign of King George V was awarded to those of the Royal Household, and other deserving recipients, of which the Honourable Thomas MacNutt, Esq. is one of them.

== See also ==
- Speaker of the Legislative Assembly of Saskatchewan
- Speaker (politics)
