= Patrick Deshaye =

Canadian politician

V. Patrick Deshaye (April 14, 1912 – 1964) was a lawyer and political figure in Saskatchewan. He represented Melville from 1948 to 1952 in the Legislative Assembly of Saskatchewan as a Liberal.

He was born in Fenwood, Saskatchewan, the son of J.O. Deshaye, and was educated in Ituna and at the University of Saskatchewan. In 1942, he married Florence E. Ottem. Deshaye served as secretary-treasurer for the rural municipality and as chairman of the separate school board. He lived in Melville, Saskatchewan. Deshaye was defeated by Allan Percy Brown when he ran for reelection to the provincial assembly in 1952.

Deshaye Catholic School, located in Regina, was named after Deshaye.
