= Ed Kaeding =

Canadian politician

Edgar Ernest Kaeding (June 16, 1920 – January 4, 2015) was a farmer and former political figure in Saskatchewan. He represented Saltcoats from 1971 to 1982 in the Legislative Assembly of Saskatchewan as a New Democratic Party (NDP) member.

He was born in Churchbridge, Saskatchewan, the son of Emil E. Kaeding, a native of Germany. Kaeding served in the provincial cabinet as Minister of Agriculture, as Minister of Municipal Affairs and as Minister of Rural Affairs. He was defeated by Walt Johnson when he ran for reelection to the Saskatchewan assembly in 1982. After leaving provincial politics, Kaeding served as administrator for the town of Churchbridge. He died in 2015, aged 94.
