= Thomas Sales =

Canadian politician (1868–1926)

Member of Parliament for Saltcoats
- In office 1921–1925
- Preceded by: Thomas MacNutt
- Succeeded by: Riding abolished in 1924;re-distributed into Last Mountain, Melville and Yorkton ridings

Personal details
- Born: 5 September 1868 Nottingham, England, United Kingdom
- Died: 15 November 1926 (aged 58)
- Party: Progressive
- Profession: farmer

Thomas Sales (5 September 1868 – 15 November 1926) was a Canadian politician and farmer. He was elected to the House of Commons of Canada in the 1921 election as a Member of the Progressive Party representing the riding of Saltcoats.
