= Anderson Lake (Saskatchewan) =

Lake in Saskatchewan, Canada

- Saltcoats Lake
- Location in Saskatchewan Anderson Lake (Canada)
- Location: RM of Saltcoats No. 213, Saskatchewan
- Coordinates: 51.0362°N 102.1568°W
- Part of: Red River drainage basin
- Basin countries: Canada
- Max. length: 3.2 km (2.0 mi)
- Max. width: .5 km (0.3 mi)
- Surface area: 60.7 ha (150 acres)
- Shore length^{1}: 5 km (3.1 mi)
- Surface elevation: 528 m (1,732 ft)
- Settlements: Saltcoats
- ^{1} Shore length is not a well-defined measure.

Anderson Lake, also known as Saltcoats Lake, is a lake in the Canadian province of Saskatchewan. It is in the Rural Municipality of Saltcoats No. 213 and adjacent to the town of Saltcoats. At 60.7 hectares (150 acres), it is a small lake with a regional park at its southern end and public trails along the eastern shore. The outflow is from the southern end and it flows north-west where it meets up with Yorkton Creek.

== Recreation ==
Saltcoats & District Regional Park is at the southern end of Anderson Lake. The park is accessed from Saltcoats and Highway 16. Some of the amenities include camping, boating, swimming, and picnicking. There is lake access via a dock in the park.

Beginning from the park, there is the 2.8-kilometre (1.7 mi) long Leflay Trail system that runs along the eastern side of the lake. The trail system runs through private land and is divided into four stages that meander through forests of aspen and balsam poplar. There are also picnic tables and lake viewpoints. The trails are named after Jay and Minne Leflay, who had previously owned the land. The Leflay Trail is part of a larger network of trails called Yellowhead Flyway Birding Trail.

== See also ==
- List of lakes of Saskatchewan
- Tourism in Saskatchewan
