= Ernest Walter Gerrand =

Canadian politician

Ernest Walter Gerrand (August 14, 1884 – 1970) was a lawyer and political figure in Saskatchewan. He represented Melville from 1935 to 1938 in the Legislative Assembly of Saskatchewan as a Liberal.

He was born in Miniota, Manitoba, the son of David Gerrand and Alice Cole, and was educated in Portage la Prairie and at the University of Manitoba. In 1913, he married a Miss Shields. Gerrand lived in Melville, Saskatchewan. He was elected to the assembly in a 1935 by-election held after James Garfield Gardiner was named to the federal cabinet.
