= Lyall Woznesensky =

Canadian football player (born 1953)

Profile
- Position: Defensive end

Personal information
- Born: April 4, 1953 (age 73); Melville, Saskatchewan, Canada

Career information
- College: Simon Fraser University

Career history
- 1977–1978: Winnipeg Blue Bombers
- 1979, 1984: Calgary Stampeders
- 1980: Hamilton Tiger-Cats
- 1981–1982: Saskatchewan Roughriders
- 1983: Toronto Argonauts
- 1983: Montreal Concordes

Lyall Woznesensky (born April 4, 1953) is a Canadian former professional football defensive lineman who played eight seasons in the Canadian Football League for six different teams. In 2006, he became the defensive co-ordinator for the football program at John Barsby Community School in Nanaimo, British Columbia.

Woznesensky played college football for the Simon Fraser Clan.
