= CJJC-FM =

Radio station in Yorkton

Coordinates: 51°12′33″N 102°44′01″W

- Yorkton, Saskatchewan; Canada
- Broadcast area: Eastern Saskatchewan; West-Central Manitoba
- Frequency: 98.5 MHz
- Branding: The Rock 98.5

Programming
- Format: Contemporary Christian music

Ownership
- Owner: Dennis M. Dyck; (101056012 Saskatchewan Ltd)

History
- First air date: December 19, 2005
- Former frequencies: 100.5 MHz (2006–2012)
- Call sign meaning: Jesus Christ

Technical information
- Class: B
- ERP: 21.5 kW vertical polarization 50 kW horizontal polarization
- HAAT: 118 metres (387 ft)

Links
- Website: therock985.ca

CJJC-FM (98.5 FM, "The Rock 98.5") is a radio station in Yorkton, Saskatchewan. Owned by Dennis M. Dyck, the station broadcasts a contemporary Christian music format.

== History ==
On October 21, 2005, the CRTC approved an application by Dennis M. Dyck for a new low-power FM radio station in Yorkton, which would broadcast a Christian radio format. The station began operations on January 2, 2006.

On August 14, 2008, CJJC requested permission to change its frequency to 98.5 FM and increase its power to a 50,000 watt class-B station, citing a financial need to attract a larger potential audience and advertiser base in Yorkton's surrounding area. The request was initially denied by the CRTC on December 5, 2008. Citing an intervention by Harvard Broadcasting, and a previous denial of a translator station to serve Melville, Saskatchewan, the CRTC argued that CJJC presented insufficient financial justification that it needed a larger advertiser base, as it was "focused on its desire to expand the existing advertiser base rather than making a case that the existing local advertising base in Yorkton was too small to support the original business plan".

In July 2011, the CRTC approved the changes, after CJJC presented additional evidence that it was insufficiently profitable, and would benefit from an expanded signal.

In August 2025, the CRTC denied a proposed sale of CJJC to Allan Hunsperger's Truth Broadcasting Network. Truth had planned to acquire the station for $150,000, and would have operated it remotely from studios in Edmonton with input from "community representatives" in Yorkton. The CRTC denied the application after Truth requested that it not be subject to the standard conditions of license for commercial radio stations, but did not provide any explanation or justification for this request.

== Notes ==
The CJJC call sign was used at an unrelated radio station in Langley, British Columbia from 1963 until the 1980s. That station is known today as CKST.
