= Grant Schmidt =

Canadian politician

Grant Jacob Schmidt (born July 21, 1948) is a former political figure in Saskatchewan, Canada. He represented Melville from 1982 to 1991 in the Legislative Assembly of Saskatchewan as a Progressive Conservative.

He was born in Balcarres, Saskatchewan, the son of George Schmidt and Helen Banerd, and received a law degree from the University of Saskatchewan. Schmidt articled in Melville and practised law there. In 1971, he married Sheron Steyck. Schmidt served in the Saskatchewan cabinet as Minister of Labour, as Minister of Social Services, as Minister of Human Resources, Labour & Employment, as Minister of Consumer and Commercial Affairs, as Minister of Economic Diversification and Trade, as Minister of Justice and Attorney General and as Provincial Secretary. He was defeated by Evan Carlson when he ran for reelection to the assembly in 1991.

The PC Party subsequently went dormant in the wake of revelations of fraud committed by several PC MLA's and caucus workers. Like many former PC members, Schmidt joined the Saskatchewan Party. Although Schmidt himself was never implicated in any wrongdoing, he was nevertheless barred from securing the Saskatchewan Party nomination in the Melville-Saltcoats provincial riding and ran unsuccessfully as an independent candidate in the 2003 election.

Schmidt subsequently rejoined the Progressive Conservatives after the party was revived by his former cabinet colleague Rick Swenson. He was eventually named President of the PC Party. Schmidt's son Kurt Schmidt ran as a PC candidate in the 2016 general election.

His brother is Canadian-German curler Rodger Schmidt.
