= George William Sahlmark =

Canadian politician

George William Sahlmark (December 8, 1874 – 1962) was a physician and political figure in Saskatchewan.

== Career ==
Sahlmark represented Saltcoats in the Legislative Assembly of Saskatchewan from 1918 to 1929 as a Liberal.

He was born in Morris, Minnesota, to A.G. Sahlmark and Kate Anderson, both natives of Sweden, and was educated in Minnesota and at the University of Manitoba. Sahlmark came to Canada in 1887. He taught school for several years. Sahlmark practised medicine in Saltcoats, Saskatchewan. In 1909, he married Clara A. Boyle. Sahlmark was first elected to the assembly in a 1918 by-election held after James Alexander Calder ran for a seat in the Canadian House of Commons.
