= Allan Percy Brown =

Canadian boxer and politician (1912–1994)

Allan Percy Brown (19 July 1912 – 2 March 1994) was a merchant, boxer and political figure in Saskatchewan. He represented Melville from 1952 to 1956 in the Legislative Assembly of Saskatchewan as a Co-operative Commonwealth Federation (CCF) member.

He was born in Lebret, Saskatchewan, the son of George Brown, and grew up there, in Cana, and in Melville. Brown worked for the Canadian National Railway during his holidays while attending school. By the age of 16, he had become the welterweight boxing champion of Saskatchewan. Brown later became welterweight champion of Canada, losing only three out of 104 bouts. After retiring from the ring, he worked as a hotel manager and as a boxing coach. Brown opened a photography business with his brother in 1945. He married Ola Atkey during the late 1930s. Brown was defeated by James Wilfrid Gardiner when he ran for reelection to the provincial assembly in 1956. He then became secretary for the provincial CCF. Brown left this position in 1961 to operate a hardware store in Pullman, Washington. In 1974, he returned to Canada, settling in Victoria, British Columbia, where he later died at the age of 81.
