= Arch Wilder =

Canadian ice hockey player

- Born: April 30, 1917; Melville, Saskatchewan, Canada
- Died: December 24, 2002 (aged 85); Calgary, Alberta, Canada
- Height: 5 ft 9 in (175 cm)
- Weight: 155 lb (70 kg; 11 st 1 lb)
- Position: Left wing
- Shot: Left
- Played for: Detroit Red Wings
- Playing career: 1935–1952

Archibald Charles Wilder (April 30, 1917 – December 24, 2002) was a Canadian professional ice hockey left winger who played 18 games in the National Hockey League (NHL) with the Detroit Red Wings during the 1940–41 season, registering two assists and two penalty minutes. The rest of his career, which lasted from 1935 to 1952, was spent in various minor leagues. Wilder was born in Melville, Saskatchewan.

== Career statistics ==
=== Regular season and playoffs ===
			Regular season					Playoffs
Season	Team	League	GP	G	A	Pts	PIM	GP	G	A	Pts	PIM
1935–36	Weyburn Beavers	SSHL	2	1	1	2	0	—	—	—	—	—
1936–37	Saskatoon Westleys	N-SJHL	—	—	—	—	—	3	5	1	6	2
1936–37	Saskatoon Westleys	M-Cup	—	—	—	—	—	8	7	3	10	2
1937–38	Detroit Pontiacs	MOHL	28	5	11	16	9	3	0	1	1	0
1938–39	Detroit Pontiacs	MOHL	27	14	17	31	6	7	3	6	9	6
1939–40	Indianapolis Capitals	IAHL	56	12	12	24	16	5	2	0	2	2
1940–41	Detroit Red Wings	NHL	18	0	2	2	2	—	—	—	—	—
1940–41	Indianapolis Capitals	AHL	9	1	3	4	0	—	—	—	—	—
1940–41	Omaha Knights	AHA	24	1	4	5	4	—	—	—	—	—
1941–42	Saskatoon Quakers	SSHL	31	8	16	24	4	9	4	1	5	2
1941–42	Saskatoon Quakers	Al-Cup	—	—	—	—	—	3	1	3	4	0
1943–44	Saskatoon Navy	SSHL	2	0	0	0	0	—	—	—	—	—
1944–45	Calgary RCAF	ASHL	16	13	8	21	2	3	0	3	3	0
1945–46	Calgary Stampeders	WCSHL	34	17	21	38	20	4	2	1	3	10
1945–46	Calgary Stampeders	Al-Cup	—	—	—	—	—	12	4	1	5	4
1946–47	Calgary Stampeders	WCSHL	40	13	12	25	14	7	3	4	7	0
1946–47	Calgary Stampeders	Al-Cup	—	—	—	—	—	17	2	7	9	0
1947–48	Calgary Stampeders	WCSHL	46	10	16	26	10	11	2	5	7	4
1948–49	Calgary Stampeders	WCSHL	45	6	14	20	10	4	0	0	0	2
1949–50	Calgary Stampeders	WCSHL	42	4	10	14	12	10	1	2	3	2
1949–50	Calgary Stampeders	Al-Cup	—	—	—	—	—	15	0	9	9	10
1950–51	Calgary Stampeders	WCSHL	30	6	13	19	21	6	0	2	2	0
1951–52	Calgary Stampeders	PCHL	28	1	5	6	2	—	—	—	—	—
WCSHL totals			207	50	73	123	66	36	8	12	20	18
NHL totals			18	0	2	2	2	—	—	—	—	—
