= Phil Besler =

Canadian ice hockey player (1913–1995)

- Born: December 9, 1913 Melville, Saskatchewan, Canada
- Died: February 13, 1995 (aged 81)
- Height: 5 ft 11 in (180 cm)
- Weight: 180 lb (82 kg; 12 st 12 lb)
- Position: Right Wing
- Shot: Right
- Played for: Boston Bruins; Chicago Blackhawks; Detroit Red Wings
- Playing career: 1934–1942

Philip Rudolph Besler (December 9, 1913 — February 13, 1995) was a Canadian hockey player who played 30 games in the National Hockey League with the Boston Bruins, Chicago Black Hawks, and Detroit Red Wings between 1935 and 1939. The rest of his career, which lasted from 1934 to 1942, was spent in different minor leagues. Besler was born in Melville, Saskatchewan.

== Career statistics ==
=== Regular season and playoffs ===
			Regular season					Playoffs
Season	Team	League	GP	G	A	Pts	PIM	GP	G	A	Pts	PIM
1929–30	Melville Millionaires	S-SSHL	20	3	0	3	25	2	0	0	0	0
1930–31	Melville Millionaires	S-SSHL	20	4	2	6	37	—	—	—	—	—
1932–33	Humboldt Indians	N-SSHL	17	7	5	12	6	—	—	—	—	—
1933–34	Prince Albert Mintos	SSHL	21	31	4	35	12	4	2	1	3	2
1934–35	Boston Tiger Cubs	Can-Am	38	6	3	9	30	3	2	0	2	13
1935–36	Boston Bruins	NHL	8	0	0	0	0	—	—	—	—	—
1935–36	Boston Cubs	Can-Am	29	4	6	10	25	—	—	—	—	—
1936–37	Portland Buckaroos	PCHL	28	13	6	19	27	3	1	0	1	2
1937–38	Portland Buckaroos	PCHL	38	24	3	27	26	2	0	1	1	6
1938–39	Chicago Black Hawks	NHL	17	1	3	4	16	—	—	—	—	—
1938–39	Providence Reds	IAHL	2	0	0	0	0	—	—	—	—	—
1938–39	Cleveland Barons	IAHL	1	0	0	0	0	—	—	—	—	—
1938–39	Detroit Red Wings	NHL	5	0	1	1	2	—	—	—	—	—
1938–39	Pittsburgh Hornets	IAHL	9	1	1	2	2	—	—	—	—	—
1939–40	Omaha Knights	AHA	48	20	16	36	57	9	3	2	5	26
1940–41	Omaha Knights	AHA	47	15	15	30	26	—	—	—	—	—
1941–42	Omaha Knights	AHA	49	17	15	32	36	8	0	3	3	17
NHL totals			30	1	4	5	18	—	—	—	—	—
