= Joe D. Phelps =

Media Literacy Theorist

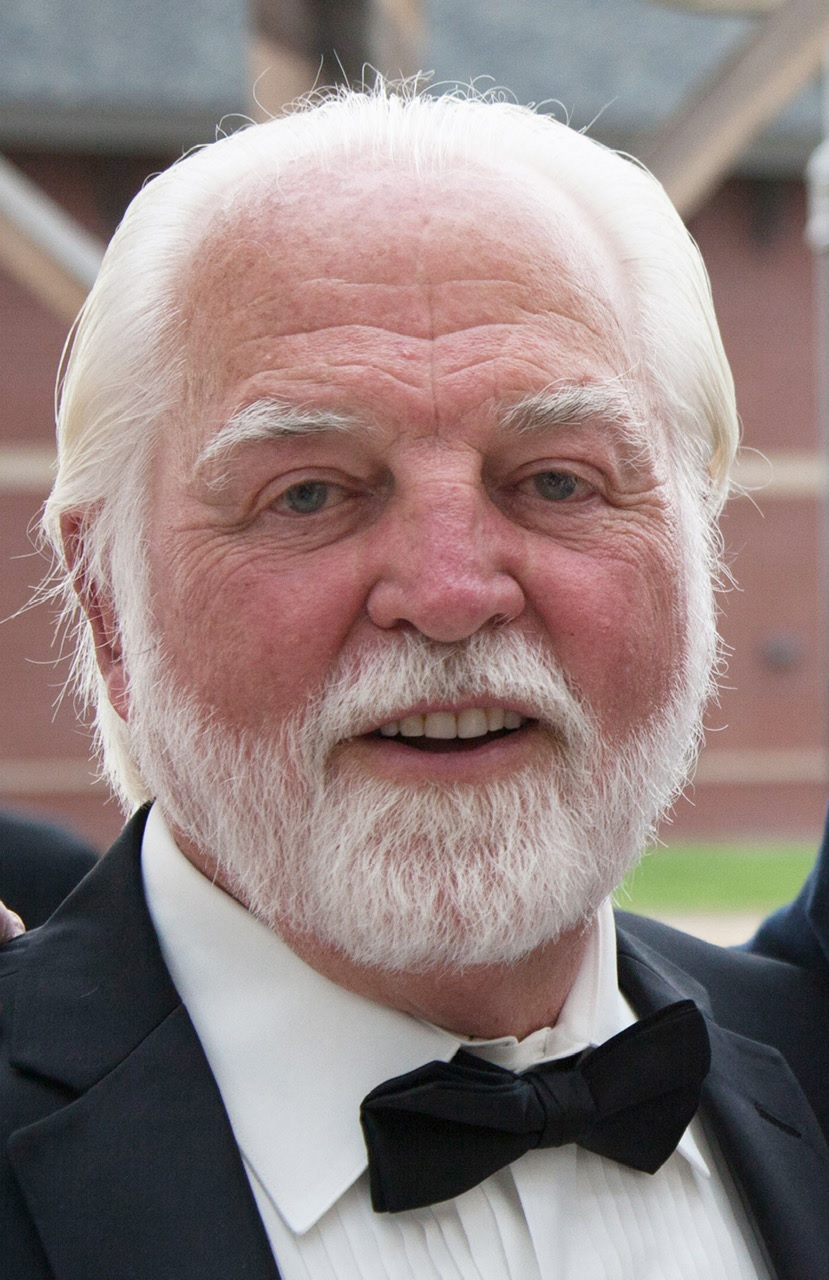
- Born: August 18, 1949; Wynnewood, Oklahoma, US
- Died: September 15, 2026 (aged 77); Bozeman, Montana, US
- Education: B.S. in Business Administration, University of Arkansas, 1972
- Occupation: Media consultant
- Employer(s): Getting Better Foundation, The Phelps Group,
- Known for: Media literacy, Organizational structure, Integrated marketing communications
- Notable work: Pyramids are Tombs, (2003)
- Spouse: Sylvia Phelps (d. 2008)
- Children: 2

Joe D. Phelps (August 18, 1949-September 15, 2026) is the Founder and Chairman of the Getting Better Foundation, a 501(c)3 charity focused on media literacy and its portrayal of positive evolutionary human behavior.

== Education and early career ==
Phelps earned a Bachelor of Business Administration from University of Arkansas in 1972, and spent most of his early career in the music industry. After a fire destroyed his recording studio in 1975 that he started his marketing career, first at Grey Advertising and then at N. W. Ayer. Dissatisfied with the way advertising agencies of the day were structured into strict hierarchies, Phelps started his own agency in 1981.

The Phelps Group was an early proponent of two schools of thought: a team-based organizational structure, and integrated marketing communications. Phelps synthesized them into a company composed of self-managed people, organized into client-centric teams. Similar to the concept of holacracy, Phelps detailed his approach in his 2003 book, "Pyramids are Tombs."

== Later life ==
In 2015, Phelps changed his focus to helping people accurately consume media communications. Based on his view that sensationalism was presenting an inaccurate and overly negative view off the world, Phelps established the Getting Better Foundation to educate people about what he considered to be positive evolutionary changes in human behavior, enlisting the help of Harvard cognitive psychologist Steven Pinker, British journalist and businessman Matthew White Ridley, and neuroeconomist Paul J. Zak.

== Awards and recognition ==
- Inc Magazine cover story, "Efficiency Experts," 1997
- Los Angeles Advertising Association "Entrepreneur Leader of the Year," 2000
