= James Ormiston =

Canadian politician

James Norris Ormiston
- Official 1966 portrait

Member of Parliament for Melville
- In office March 1958 – April 1968
- Preceded by: James Garfield Gardiner
- Succeeded by: riding abolished

Personal details
- Born: 30 May 1915 Regina, Saskatchewan, Canada
- Died: 7 August 1977 (aged 62)
- Party: Progressive Conservative
- Profession: farmer, insurance agent

James Norris Ormiston (30 May 1915 – 7 August 1977) was a Progressive Conservative member of the House of Commons of Canada. He was born in Regina, Saskatchewan and became a farmer and insurance agent by career.

He was first elected at the Melville riding in the 1958 general election after unsuccessful bids for a seat there in 1953 and 1957. In his first three federal campaigns, his Liberal opponent was incumbent Member of Parliament James Garfield Gardiner. Ormiston was re-elected in 1962, 1963 and 1965. With riding boundary changes in advance of the 1968 election, Ormiston became a candidate at the Yorkton—Melville riding, where he was defeated by Lorne Nystrom of the New Democratic Party.
