= Joseph Lee Phelps =

Canadian farmer and politician (1899–1983)

MLA for Saltcoats
- In office 1938–1948
- Preceded by: riding reconstituted
- Succeeded by: Asmundur Loptson

Minister of Natural Resources and Industrial Development
- In office 1944–1948

Personal details
- Born: August 12, 1899 Belleville, Ontario
- Died: March 15, 1983 (aged 83)
- Party: Co-operative Commonwealth Federation
- Profession: farmer

Joseph Lee Phelps (August 12, 1899 – March 15, 1983) was a farmer and political figure in Saskatchewan. He represented Saltcoats from 1938 to 1948 in the Legislative Assembly of Saskatchewan as a Co-operative Commonwealth Federation (CCF) member.

He was born in Belleville, Ontario and came west with his family in 1908, settling on a homestead near Wilkie, Saskatchewan. In 1918, he became a district director for the Saskatchewan Grain Growers' Association. In 1928, he participated in the convention where the United Farmers of Canada was formed. Phelps was a founding member of the Farmer-Labour party. He served in the provincial cabinet as Minister of Natural Resources and Industrial Development. Phelps was defeated when he ran for reelection to the assembly in 1948. In 1949, he helped rebuild the United Farmers of Canada into the Saskatchewan Farmers Union, serving as its president from 1949 to 1954.

Phelps helped establish the Western Development Museum, as well as museums in Yorkton, Saskatoon and North Battleford.

In 1982, he was named to the Saskatchewan Agricultural Hall of Fame.
