= James Alexander Calder =

Canadian politician

The Honourable James Alexander Calder PC
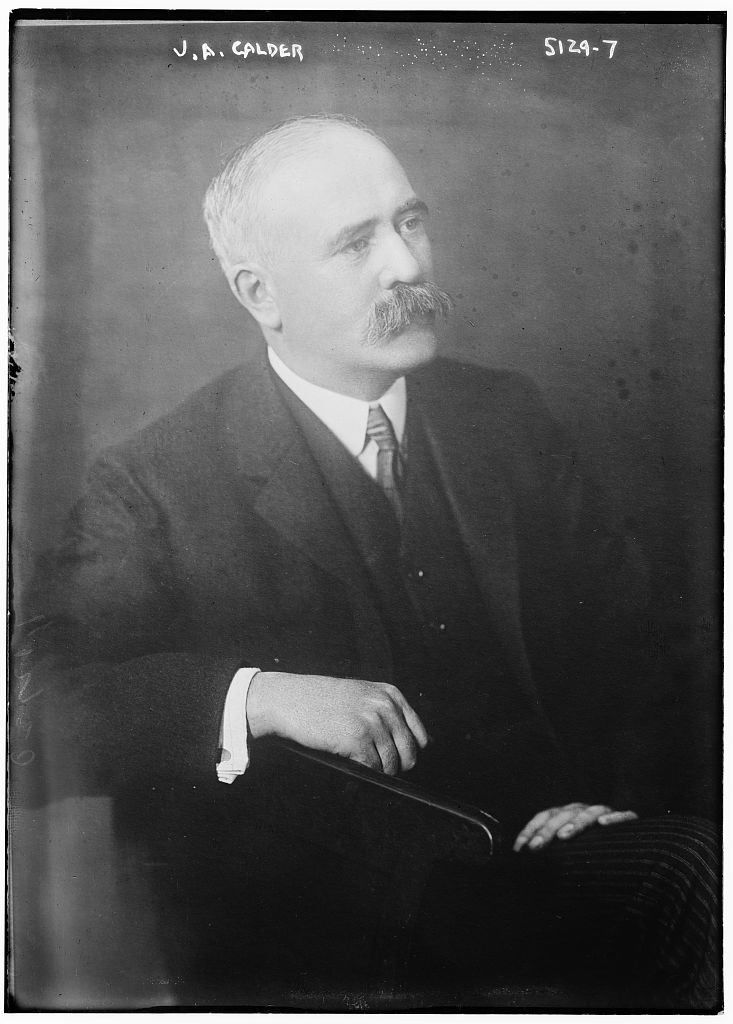

President of the Executive Council of Saskatchewan
- In office October 20, 1916 – October 20, 1917
- Preceded by: Walter Scott
- Succeeded by: William Melville Martin

Member of the Legislative Assembly of Saskatchewan for South Regina
- In office 1905–1908
- Preceded by: District established
- Succeeded by: District abolished

Member of the Legislative Assembly of Saskatchewan for Saltcoats
- In office 1908–1917
- Preceded by: Thomas MacNutt
- Succeeded by: George William Sahlmark

Member of the Canadian Parliament for Moose Jaw
- In office 1917–1921
- Preceded by: William Erskine Knowles
- Succeeded by: Robert Milton Johnson

Canadian Senator from Saskatchewan
- In office September 22, 1921 – July 20, 1956
- Appointed by: Arthur Meighen

Minister of presiding the Department of Health and Minister of Immigration and Colonization
- In office July 10, 1920 – September 21, 1921
- Preceded by: Newton Rowell
- Succeeded by: John Wesley Edwards

Personal details
- Born: September 17, 1868 Oxford County, Ontario, Canada
- Died: July 20, 1956 (aged 87)
- Party: Provincial: Saskatchewan Liberal (1905-1917); Federal: Unionist (1917-1921); Conservative (1921–1942); Progressive Conservative (1942–1956)
- Education: University of Manitoba
- Profession: Politician; teacher; principal

James Alexander Calder PC (September 17, 1868 – July 20, 1956) was a Canadian politician.

== Biography ==
Born in Oxford County, Ontario, he received his Bachelor of Arts degree from the University of Manitoba in 1888. He was a teacher and principal, before being elected to the Legislative Assembly of Saskatchewan for the riding of South Regina in the 1905 provincial election. A Liberal, he was re-elected in a 1908 by-election and in the 1912 election. From 1905 to 1912, he was the Minister of Education, Provincial Treasurer, and Minister of Railways. The rural village of Calder, SK was named after him when it was incorporated in 1911. From 1916 to 1917, he was the President of the Executive Council, Minister of Railways, and Minister of Highways.

He was elected as a Unionist candidate to the House of Commons of Canada for the riding of Moose Jaw in the 1917 federal election. He held many ministerial positions including Minister of Immigration and Colonization, Minister of Agriculture (Acting), Minister of Militia and Defence (Acting), President of the Privy Council, and Minister presiding over the Department of Health.

In 1921, he was called to the Canadian Senate, appointed on the advice of The Rt. Hon. Arthur Meighen, representing the senatorial division of Moose Jaw, Saskatchewan. A Conservative (and later Progressive Conservative), he died in office in 1956.

== Philately ==
Outside politics, Calder was a noted philatelist who signed the Roll of Distinguished Philatelists in 1947.

== Electoral history ==
1905 Saskatchewan general election: South Regina electoral district
Party	Candidate	Votes	%	±%
Liberal	James Alexander Calder	872	52.15%	–
Provincial Rights	James Benjamin Hawkes	800	47.85%	–
Total		1,672	100.00%	

1908 Saskatchewan general election: Milestone electoral district
Party	Candidate	Votes	%	±%
Provincial Rights	Albert Eugene Whitmore	1,097	51.55%	+3.70
Liberal	James Alexander Calder	1,031	48.45%	-3.70
Total		2,128	100.00%	

December 7, 1908 By-election: Saltcoats electoral district
Party	Candidate	Votes	%	±%
Liberal	James Alexander Calder	1,101	81.25%	+16.31
Independent	Hugh Alexander Green	254	18.75%	–
Total		1,355	100.00%	

1912 Saskatchewan general election: Saltcoats electoral district
Party	Candidate	Votes	%	±%
Liberal	James Alexander Calder	1,357	74.07%	-7.18
Conservative	James Nixon	475	25.93%	-
Total		1,832	100.00%	

1917 Saskatchewan general election: Saltcoats electoral district
Party	Candidate	Votes	%	±%
Liberal	James Alexander Calder	2,699	71.14%	-2.93
Conservative	Henry Leppington	1,095	28.86%	+2.93
Total		3,794	100.00%	

1917 Canadian federal election
Party	Candidate	Votes
Government (Unionist)	CALDER, Hon. James Alexander	8,866
Opposition-Labour	SOMERVILLE, James	2,946

Political offices
Preceded by Newton Rowell	Minister presiding over the Department of Health; 1920–1921	Succeeded by John Wesley Edwards
