= Saltcoats (provincial electoral district) =

Former provincial electoral district in Saskatchewan, Canada

Coordinates: 50°57′N 101°57′W

Saltcoats was a provincial electoral district for the Legislative Assembly of the province of Saskatchewan, Canada, centred on the town of Saltcoats. One of 25 districts created before the 1st Saskatchewan general election in 1905, it was abolished before the 8th Saskatchewan general election in 1934.

The district was reconstituted before the 1938 election and abolished in 2003 into Canora-Pelly and Melville-Saltcoats. It is now part of the constituency of Melville-Saltcoats.

== Members of the Legislative Assembly ==
=== 1905–1934 ===
#	MLA	Served	Party
1.	Thomas MacNutt	1905–1908	Liberal
2.	James Alexander Calder	Dec. 1908 – June 1918	Liberal
3.	George William Sahlmark	Aug. 1918 – 1929	Liberal
4.	Asmundur Loptson	1929–1934	Liberal

=== 1938–2003 ===
#	MLA	Served	Party
1.	Joseph Lee Phelps	1938–1948	CCF
2.	Asmundur Loptson	1948–1960	Liberal
3.	James Snedker	1960–1971	Liberal
4.	Ed Kaeding	1971–1982	New Democrat
5.	Walt Johnson	1982–1991	Progressive Conservative
6.	Reg Knezacek	1991–1995	New Democrat
7.	Bob Bjornerud	1995–1997	Liberal
8.	Bob Bjornerud	1997–2003	Saskatchewan Party

== Election results ==
1905 Saskatchewan general election: Saltcoats electoral district
Party	Candidate	Votes	%	±%
Liberal	Thomas MacNutt	1,006	67.34%	–
Provincial Rights	Archibald Crooke Thompson	488	32.66%	–
Total		1,494	100.00%	

1908 Saskatchewan general election: Saltcoats electoral district
Party	Candidate	Votes	%	±%
Liberal	Thomas MacNutt	1,002	64.94%	-2.40
Provincial Rights	Archibald Crooke Thompson	541	35.06%	+2.40
Total		1,543	100.00%	

December 7, 1908 By-election: Saltcoats electoral district
Party	Candidate	Votes	%	±%
Liberal	James Alexander Calder	1,101	81.25%	+16.31
Independent	Hugh Alexander Green	254	18.75%	–
Total		1,355	100.00%	

1912 Saskatchewan general election: Saltcoats electoral district
Party	Candidate	Votes	%	±%
Liberal	James Alexander Calder	1,357	74.07%	-7.18
Conservative	James Nixon	475	25.93%	-
Total		1,832	100.00%	

1917 Saskatchewan general election: Saltcoats electoral district
Party	Candidate	Votes	%	±%
Liberal	James Alexander Calder	2,699	71.14%	-2.93
Conservative	Henry Leppington	1,095	28.86%	+2.93
Total		3,794	100.00%	

July 11, 1918 By-election: Saltcoats electoral district
Party	Candidate	Votes	%	±%
Liberal	George Sahlmark	1,495	57.48%	-13.66
Conservative	Amos Burkell	1,106	42.52%	+13.66
Total		2,601	100.00%	

1921 Saskatchewan general election: Saltcoats electoral district
Party	Candidate	Votes	%	±%
Liberal	George Sahlmark	Acclaimed	100.00%	
Total		Acclamation		

1925 Saskatchewan general election: Saltcoats electoral district
Party	Candidate	Votes	%	±%
Liberal	George Sahlmark	2,376	62.41%	-
Progressive	Johannes Einarsson	1,431	37.59%	–
Total		3,807	100.00%	

1929 Saskatchewan general election: Saltcoats electoral district
Party	Candidate	Votes	%	±%
Liberal	Asmundur Loptson	2,620	52.16%	-10.25
Independent	Amos Burkell	2,403	47.84%	-
Total		5,023	100.00%	

1938 Saskatchewan general election: Saltcoats electoral district
Party	Candidate	Votes	%	±%
CCF	Joseph L. Phelps	3,409	45.29%	–
Liberal	Asmundur Loptson	3,114	41.38%	-
Social Credit	Alexander E. Sahlmark	1,003	13.33%	–
Total		7,526	100.00%	

1944 Saskatchewan general election: Saltcoats electoral district
Party	Candidate	Votes	%	±%
CCF	Joseph L. Phelps	3,461	50.98%	+5.69
Liberal	Donald A. MacKenzie	2,874	42.33%	+0.95
Prog. Conservative	Rae Melville Salkeld	454	6.69%	-
Total		6,789	100.00%	

1948 Saskatchewan general election: Saltcoats electoral district
Party	Candidate	Votes	%	±%
Liberal	Asmundur Loptson	3,945	47.12%	+4.79
CCF	Joseph L. Phelps	3,620	43.24%	-7.74
Social Credit	George A. Dulmage	807	9.64%	-
Total		8,372	100.00%	

1952 Saskatchewan general election: Saltcoats electoral district
Party	Candidate	Votes	%	±%
Liberal	Asmundur Loptson	4,000	51.78%	+4.66
CCF	Linton A. McDonald	3,725	48.22%	+4.98
Total		7,725	100.00%	

1956 Saskatchewan general election: Saltcoats electoral district
Party	Candidate	Votes	%	±%
Liberal	Asmundur Loptson	3,097	42.63%	-9.15
CCF	Alexander Lukiwski	2,684	36.95%	-11.27
Social Credit	C.F. Wagner	1,483	20.42%	-
Total		7,264	100.00%	

1960 Saskatchewan general election: Saltcoats electoral district
Party	Candidate	Votes	%	±%
Liberal	James Snedker	3,215	47.12%	+4.49
CCF	Frederick Rupert Kirkham	2,251	32.99%	-3.96
Prog. Conservative	Thomas Jones Neal	793	11.62%	-
Social Credit	Anthony Batza	564	8.27%	-12.15
Total		6,823	100.00%	

1964 Saskatchewan general election: Saltcoats electoral district
Party	Candidate	Votes	%	±%
Liberal	James Snedker	3,260	46.10%	-1.02
CCF	Baldur M. Olson	2,275	32.17%	-0.82
Prog. Conservative	David Arthur Keyes	1,537	21.73%	+10.11
Total		7,072	100.00%	

1967 Saskatchewan general election: Saltcoats electoral district
Party	Candidate	Votes	%	±%
Liberal	James Snedker	3,639	52.47%	+6.37
NDP	Charles Woolfitt	2,392	34.49%	+2.32
Prog. Conservative	Cliff Obre	904	13.04%	-8.69
Total		6,935	100.00%	

1971 Saskatchewan general election: Saltcoats electoral district
Party	Candidate	Votes	%	±%
NDP	Ed Kaeding	3,574	50.63%	+16.14
Liberal	James Snedker	3,485	49.37%	-3.10
Total		7,059	100.00%	

1975 Saskatchewan general election: Saltcoats electoral district
Party	Candidate	Votes	%	±%
NDP	Ed Kaeding	2,887	40.93%	-9.70
Progressive Conservative	Wilfred J. Walker	2,109	29.90%	-
Liberal	William H. Peasley	2,058	29.17%	-20.20
Total		7,054	100.00%	

1978 Saskatchewan general election: Saltcoats electoral district
Party	Candidate	Votes	%	±%
NDP	Ed Kaeding	3,354	45.95%	+5.02
Progressive Conservative	Walt Johnson	3,265	44.73%	+14.83
Liberal	Gabriel R. Neumeier	680	9.32%	-19.85
Total		7,299	100.00%	

1982 Saskatchewan general election: Saltcoats electoral district
Party	Candidate	Votes	%	±%
Progressive Conservative	Walt Johnson	3,921	49.83%	+5.10
NDP	Ed Kaeding	3,531	44.88%	-1.07
Liberal	James R. Coueslan	416	5.29%	-4.03
Total		7,868	100.00%	

1986 Saskatchewan general election: Saltcoats electoral district
Party	Candidate	Votes	%	±%
Progressive Conservative	Walt Johnson	3,612	47.47%	-2.36
NDP	Reg Knezacek	3,549	46.64%	+1.76
Liberal	Leslie Popp	448	5.89%	+0.60
Total		7,609	100.00%	

1991 Saskatchewan general election: Saltcoats electoral district
Party	Candidate	Votes	%	±%
NDP	Reg Knezacek	3,745	52.49%	+5.85
Prog. Conservative	Rod Roden	2,356	33.03%	-14.44
Liberal	Leslie Popp	1,033	14.48%	+8.59
Total		7,134	100.00%	

1995 Saskatchewan general election
Party	Candidate	Votes	%	±%
Liberal	Bob Bjornerud	3,635	45.53%	+31.05
New Democratic	Reg Knezacek	3,053	38.25%	−14.24
Progressive Conservative	Ken Johnson	1,295	16.22%	−16.81
Total		7,983	100.00%	

1999 Saskatchewan general election
Party	Candidate	Votes	%	±%
Saskatchewan	Bob Bjornerud	4,688	62.47%	—
New Democratic	Leo Fuhr	1,884	25.10%	−13.15
Liberal	Vic Polsom	933	12.43%	−33.10
Total		7,505	100.00%	

== See also ==
- List of Saskatchewan provincial electoral districts
- List of Saskatchewan general elections
- Canadian provincial electoral districts
- Saltcoats — North-West Territories territorial electoral district (1870–1905)
