= James Wilfrid Gardiner =

Canadian politician

James Wilfrid "Wilf" Gardiner (July 27, 1924 – October 3, 2002) was a farmer, civil servant and political figure in Saskatchewan. He represented Melville from 1956 to 1967 in the Legislative Assembly of Saskatchewan as a Liberal.

He was born in Regina, Saskatchewan, the son of cabinet minister (and future premier) James Garfield Gardiner and Violet McEwen, and was educated in Regina, in Lemberg, in Ottawa, at Luther College in Regina and at Queen's University in Kingston, Ontario. In 1946, he married Margaret I. Hudgin. In the same year, he returned to Lemberg, where he began farming; later becoming a general business agent. Gardiner also served as Lemberg's town clerk, as secretary for the local school board and secretary for the Lemberg Rural Telephone Company. He was an unsuccessful candidate for the Last Mountain seat in the provincial assembly in 1948 and 1952 before being elected in 1956. He unsuccessfully ran for the leadership of the provincial Liberal party in 1954 and 1959. Gardiner served in the provincial cabinet as Minister of Public Works. He was defeated by John Kowalchuk when he ran for reelection in 1967. After leaving politics, he operated a hotel in Bienfait and then the Regina Hotel in Regina. From 1968 to 1971, he was deputy Minister for Co-operation and Co-operative Development. He was defeated by Walter Smishek when he ran in the provincial riding of Regina North East in 1971. He ran unsuccessfully for the Qu'Appelle—Moose Mountain seat in the Canadian House of Commons in 1974. Gardiner died in Regina at the age of 78.
