= Saltcoats (federal electoral district) =

Former federal electoral district in Saskatchewan, Canada

Saltcoats was a federal electoral district in Saskatchewan, Canada, that was represented in the House of Commons of Canada from 1908 to 1925. This riding was created in 1907 from parts of Assiniboia East, and Qu'Appelle ridings. It consisted of a part of eastern Saskatchewan north of the Qu'Appelle river. It was abolished in 1924 when it was redistributed into Last Mountain, Melville and Yorkton ridings.

== Election results ==
1908 Canadian federal election
Party	Candidate	Votes
Liberal	Thomas MacNutt	2,520
Conservative	John Charles Miller	1,842
Independent	Joseph Edward Paynter	347

1911 Canadian federal election
Party	Candidate	Votes
Liberal	Thomas MacNutt	3,619
Conservative	James Nixon	1,934

1917 Canadian federal election
Party	Candidate	Votes
Government (Unionist)	Thomas MacNutt	4,618
Opposition (Laurier Liberals)	John Rowan	1,655

1921 Canadian federal election
Party	Candidate	Votes
Progressive	Thomas Sales	6,335
Liberal	Hugh Herbert Christie	2,986
Progressive	Thomas MacNutt	1,714

== See also ==
- List of Canadian electoral districts
- Historical federal electoral districts of Canada
