= William James Arthurs =

Canadian politician

- Born: 1888; Janetville, Ontario
- Died: July 14, 1971 (aged 82–83)

William James Arthurs (1888 – July 14, 1971) was a railway conductor and political figure in Saskatchewan. He represented Melville from 1944 to 1948 in the Legislative Assembly of Saskatchewan as a Co-operative Commonwealth Federation (CCF) member.

He was born in Janetville, Ontario, and came to Balcarres, Saskatchewan, in 1905. He ran unsuccessfully for the Melville seat in the Canadian House of Commons in 1949, losing to James Garfield Gardiner. Arthurs worked for the Canadian National Railway for 40 years, first as a brakeman and then as a conductor; he retired in 1953.

Arthurs moved to Vancouver after retiring from his railway job, where he lived the rest of his life. He died in 1971.
