= John Russell Kowalchuk =

Canadian politician

John Russell Kowalchuk (August 30, 1921 – August 18, 2000) was an educator, businessman, farmer and political figure in Saskatchewan. He represented Melville from 1967 to 1982 in the Legislative Assembly of Saskatchewan as a New Democratic Party (NDP) member.

He was born on the family farm near Goodeve, Saskatchewan, the son of Nicholas Kowalchuk, and was educated in Goodeve and at the Regina normal school. Kowalchuk earned a teaching certificate from the University of Saskatchewan by taking correspondence courses. From 1942 to 1956, he taught school in the Melville area. In 1951, he married Emma Amelia Dohms. After 1956, he operated a grocery store, locker plant and insurance business until 1961, when he began farming. He served on the board for the Melville school unit from 1959 to 1967, also serving as board chairman. Kowalchuk was reeve for the rural municipality of Stanley from 1964 to 1966. He served in the Saskatchewan cabinet as Minister of Natural Resources. After leaving politics, he returned to farming. In 1986, he retired from farming and moved to Melville. He died there at the age of 78.
