= Ministry of Agriculture (Saskatchewan) =

- Le ministère de l’Agriculture

Organization overview
- Formed: 1906
- Minister responsible: David Marit
- Deputy Ministers responsible: Rick Burton
- Parent Organization: Government of Saskatchewan
- Website: www.saskatchewan.ca/agriculture

The Ministry of Agriculture is responsible for government programs associated with agriculture in the province of Saskatchewan, Canada. William Richard Motherwell was the first Saskatchewan Minister of Agriculture from 1906-1917.

== Branches ==
The ministry is composed of the following branches:

- Agriculture Research including running the Agriculture Development Fund, Agri-Value Program, and Strategic Research Program.
- Communications including published the AGRIVIEW newsletter.
- Corporate Services (internal administrative, financial and IT services)
- Crops
- Financial Programs (including Agricultural Credit Corporation of Saskatchewan, Livestock Loan Guarantee Program, Canada Advance Payment Program - Interest Rebate, Short-term Hog Loan Program, Meat Processing Investment Rebate Program, Canada-Saskatchewan SRM Management Program, Farm and Ranch Water Infrastructure Program, and Gopher Control Rebate Program.
- Irrigation
- Lands
- Livestock
- Policy
- Regional Services
- Saskatchewan Crop Insurance Corporation
