= Walter Robert Johnson =

Canadian politician

Walter Robert Johnson (September 27, 1927 – February 19, 1994) was a farmer, rancher and political figure in Saskatchewan, Canada. He represented Saltcoats from 1982 to 1991 in the Legislative Assembly of Saskatchewan as a Progressive Conservative.

He was born in Spy Hill, Saskatchewan in 1927, the son of Julius G. Johnson and Laura S. Thoradson. In 1952, Johnson married Dorothea Elaine Olson. Johnson was a livestock producer, a director of the Saskatchewan Hereford Association and a member of the Royal Canadian Legion. Johnson ran unsuccessfully for a seat in the provincial assembly in 1978 before being elected in 1982. He died in 1994 at the age of 66.
