= Melville (federal electoral district) =

Former federal electoral district in Saskatchewan, Canada

Coordinates: 50.8558°N 103.1513°W

Melville was a federal electoral district in Saskatchewan, Canada, that was represented in the House of Commons of Canada from 1925 to 1968. This riding was created in 1924 from parts of Saltcoats riding.

It was abolished in 1966 when it was redistributed into Regina East and Yorkton—Melville ridings.

== Election results ==
1925 Canadian federal election
Party	Candidate	Votes
Liberal	William Richard Motherwell	5,305
Progressive	William James Hepburn	2,302
Conservative	John Robert Dinnin	1,692

1926 Canadian federal election
Party	Candidate	Votes
Liberal	William Richard Motherwell	7,946
Conservative	John A.M. Patrick	3,796

By-election on 2 November 1926 On Motherwell's acceptance of an office of emolument under the Crown, 11 October 1926
Party	Candidate	Votes
Liberal	William Richard Motherwell	acclaimed

1930 Canadian federal election
Party	Candidate	Votes
Liberal	William Richard Motherwell	6,965
Conservative	George Nelson Hart	4,041
Farmer	John Morris Thomas	3,221

1935 Canadian federal election
Party	Candidate	Votes
Liberal	William Richard Motherwell	8,726
Social Credit	Holger Munch	3,727
Conservative	George Nelson Hart	3,010
Co-operative Commonwealth	Leslie Milford Switzer	2,892

1940 Canadian federal election
Party	Candidate	Votes
Liberal	James Garfield Gardiner	10,158
Co-operative Commonwealth	Louise Lucas	9,042
Unity	Gilbert Henry Bartlett	1,837

1945 Canadian federal election
Party	Candidate	Votes
Liberal	James Garfield Gardiner	10,095
Co-operative Commonwealth	Helmer John Benson	10,067

1949 Canadian federal election
Party	Candidate	Votes
Liberal	James Garfield Gardiner	11,120
Co-operative Commonwealth	William James Arthurs	6,388
Progressive Conservative	Thomas William Drever	1,465

1953 Canadian federal election
Party	Candidate	Votes
Liberal	James Garfield Gardiner	10,024
Co-operative Commonwealth	Percy Ellis Wright	8,092
Progressive Conservative	James Norris Ormiston	1,142
Social Credit	Louis Wendell	783

1957 Canadian federal election
Party	Candidate	Votes
Liberal	James Garfield Gardiner	7,949
Co-operative Commonwealth	John Burton	7,590
Progressive Conservative	James Ormiston	2,596
Social Credit	David Mercier	1,429

1958 Canadian federal election
Party	Candidate	Votes
Progressive Conservative	James Ormiston	8,440
Co-operative Commonwealth	John Burton	5,698
Liberal	James Garfield Gardiner	5,673

1962 Canadian federal election
Party	Candidate	Votes
Progressive Conservative	James Ormiston	8,520
Liberal	Robert A. Monteith	5,702
New Democratic	John Burton	4,313
Social Credit	John Lang	859

1963 Canadian federal election
Party	Candidate	Votes
Progressive Conservative	James Ormiston	9,412
Liberal	Jack Kreiser	5,629
New Democratic	Joe L. Phelps	3,464
Social Credit	John Lang	925

1965 Canadian federal election
Party	Candidate	Votes
Progressive Conservative	James Ormiston	8,843
Liberal	Jack Kreiser	5,242
New Democratic	Walter M. Blahey	4,122
Social Credit	Louis E. Obenauer	734

== See also ==
- List of Canadian electoral districts
- Historical federal electoral districts of Canada
