= Rural Municipality of Saltcoats No. 213 =

Rural municipality in Saskatchewan, Canada

Saltcoats No. 213
- Rural municipality
- Rural Municipality of Saltcoats No. 213
- Location of the RM of Saltcoats No. 213 in Saskatchewan
- Coordinates: 50.995°N 102.209°W
- Country: Canada
- Province: Saskatchewan
- Census division: 5
- SARM division: 1
- Formed: December 9, 1912

Government
  - Reeve: Don Taylor
  - Governing body: RM of Saltcoats No. 213 Council
  - Administrator: Ronald Risling
  - Office location: Saltcoats

Area (2016)
  - Land: 830.58 km^{2} (320.69 sq mi)

Population (2016)
  - Total: 712
  - Density: 0.9/km^{2} (2.3/sq mi)
- Time zone: CST
  - Summer (DST): CST
- Area codes: 306 and 639

The Rural Municipality of Saltcoats No. 213 (2016 population: 712) is a rural municipality (RM) in the Canadian province of Saskatchewan within Census Division No. 5 and SARM Division No. 1. It is located in the east-central portion of the province.

== History ==
The RM of Saltcoats No. 213 incorporated as a rural municipality on December 9, 1912.

== Geography ==
=== Communities and localities ===
The following urban municipalities are surrounded by the RM.

Towns

- Bredenbury
- Saltcoats

The RM also neighbours the Little Bone 74B First Nations Indian reserve.

== Demographics ==
Population history (1981–2016)
Year	Pop.	±%
1981	1,057	—
1986	1,005	−4.9%
1991	971	−3.4%
1996	886	−8.8%
2001	801	−9.6%
2006	746	−6.9%
2011	673	−9.8%
2016	712	+5.8%
Source: Statistics Canada via Saskatchewan Bureau of Statistics

In the 2021 Census of Population conducted by Statistics Canada, the RM of Saltcoats No. 213 had a population of 743 living in 278 of its 300 total private dwellings, a change of 4.4% from its 2016 population of 712. With a land area of 824.85 km^{2} (318.48 sq mi), it had a population density of 0.9/km^{2} (2.3/sq mi) in 2021.

In the 2016 Census of Population, the RM of Saltcoats No. 213 recorded a population of 712 living in 255 of its 285 total private dwellings, a 5.8% change from its 2011 population of 673. With a land area of 830.58 km^{2} (320.69 sq mi), it had a population density of 0.9/km^{2} (2.2/sq mi) in 2016.

== Government ==
The RM of Saltcoats No. 213 is governed by an elected municipal council and an appointed administrator that meets on the second Tuesday of every month. The reeve of the RM is Don Taylor while its administrator is Ronald Risling. The RM's office is located in Saltcoats.
