= Asmundur Loptson =

Canadian politician (1885–1972)

Ásmundur "Minty" Loptson (February 14, 1885 – February 25, 1972) was a merchant, farmer, highway contractor and political figure in Saskatchewan. He represented Saltcoats from 1929 to 1934 and from 1948 to 1960 and Pheasant Hills from 1934 to 1948 in the Legislative Assembly of Saskatchewan as a Liberal. His surname also appears misspelled as Lopston in some sources.

Born in Iceland, the son of Sveinbjörn Loptson and Steinunn Ásmundsdóttir, he came to Winnipeg, Manitoba with his parents in 1887. In 1891, the family moved to Saskatchewan. Loptson trained as a harness-maker and then moved to Selkirk, Manitoba, where he apprenticed as a jeweler. He married Kristin Sveinbjörnson in 1908. In 1909, Loptson opened a general store in Bredenbury, Saskatchewan. He was a member of the council for the rural municipality of Saltcoats No. 213, Saskatchewan, serving four years as reeve. He also served on the town council for Bredenbury, also serving as secretary-treasurer and mayor of the town. Loptson was defeated by Joseph Lee Phelps when he ran for reelection to the assembly in 1938. After his defeat, he returned to farming, retiring in 1945. Loptson ran for an assembly seat again in 1948, defeating Phelps. He served as interim Liberal Party leader and opposition leader in the assembly in 1954 after Walter Tucker returned to federal politics. Loptson retired from the assembly in 1960, moving to Yorkton. He died in Winnipeg in 1972. He is buried in the Yorkton City Cemetery.
