= Reg Knezacek =

Canadian politician

MLA for Saltcoats
- In office 1991–1995

Personal details
- Born: December 27, 1945 Esterhazy, Saskatchewan, Canada
- Died: September 25, 2026 (aged 80) Esterhazy, Saskatchewan, Canada
- Party: Saskatchewan New Democratic Party

Reginald Mark Knezacek (December 27, 1945 – September 25, 2026) was a Canadian politician who served in the Legislative Assembly of Saskatchewan from 1991 to 1995, as a NDP member for the constituency of Saltcoats. He died in Esterhazy in 2026, at the age of 80.
