= Warren Kaeding =

Canadian politician

The Honourable Warren Kaeding ECS MLA

Member of the Saskatchewan Legislative Assembly for Melville-Saltcoats
- Incumbent
- Assumed office April 4, 2016
- Preceded by: Bob Bjornerud

Personal details
- Party: Saskatchewan Party

Warren Kaeding is a Canadian politician, who was elected to the Legislative Assembly of Saskatchewan in the 2016 provincial election. He represents the electoral district of Melville-Saltcoats as a member of the Saskatchewan Party.

Kaeding received his Bachelor of Science in Agriculture from the University of Saskatchewan College of Agriculture and Bioresources in 1985. From 1986 to 2011 he was the owner/operator of Wagon Wheel Seed Corp. Kaeding and his wife Carla were awarded the title of National Outstanding Young Farmers in 1999. Prior to entering politics, he chaired the local economic development board, served as an elder at his church, coached various sports, and participated in the local Lions Club.

Kaeding was the Legislative Secretary to the Minister of Agriculture (Irrigation Expansion), as well as a Legislative Secretary to the Minister responsible for SaskTel (Cellular Coverage and Internet Coverage). He has served as a member of the Legislature's Standing Committee on Crowns and Central Agencies, the Crown Investments Corporation Board and Public Accounts Committee, the Standing Committee on the Economy and the Legislation and Regulation Review Committee.

Kaeding entered cabinet on February 2, 2018, as the Minister of Government Relations and Minister of First Nations, Metis and Northern Affairs. Since then, he has served as the Minister of Environment, Minister of Government Relations, Minister responsible for Rural and Remote Health, and Minister responsible for Seniors. He currently is the Minister of Trade and Export Development.

Saskatchewan provincial government of Scott Moe
Cabinet posts (4)
Predecessor	Office	Successor
Dustin Duncan	Minister of Environment; November 9, 2020–May 31, 2022	Dana Skoropad
Greg Ottenbreit	Minister of Rural and Remote Health; August 13, 2019–November 9, 2020	Everett Hindley
Larry Doke	Minister of Government Relations; February 2, 2018–August 13, 2019	Lori Carr
Larry Doke	Minister of First Nations, Métis and Northern Affairs; February 2, 2018–August 13, 2019	Lori Carr
