= Melville, Saskatchewan =

City in Saskatchewan, Canada

Melville
- City
- City of Melville
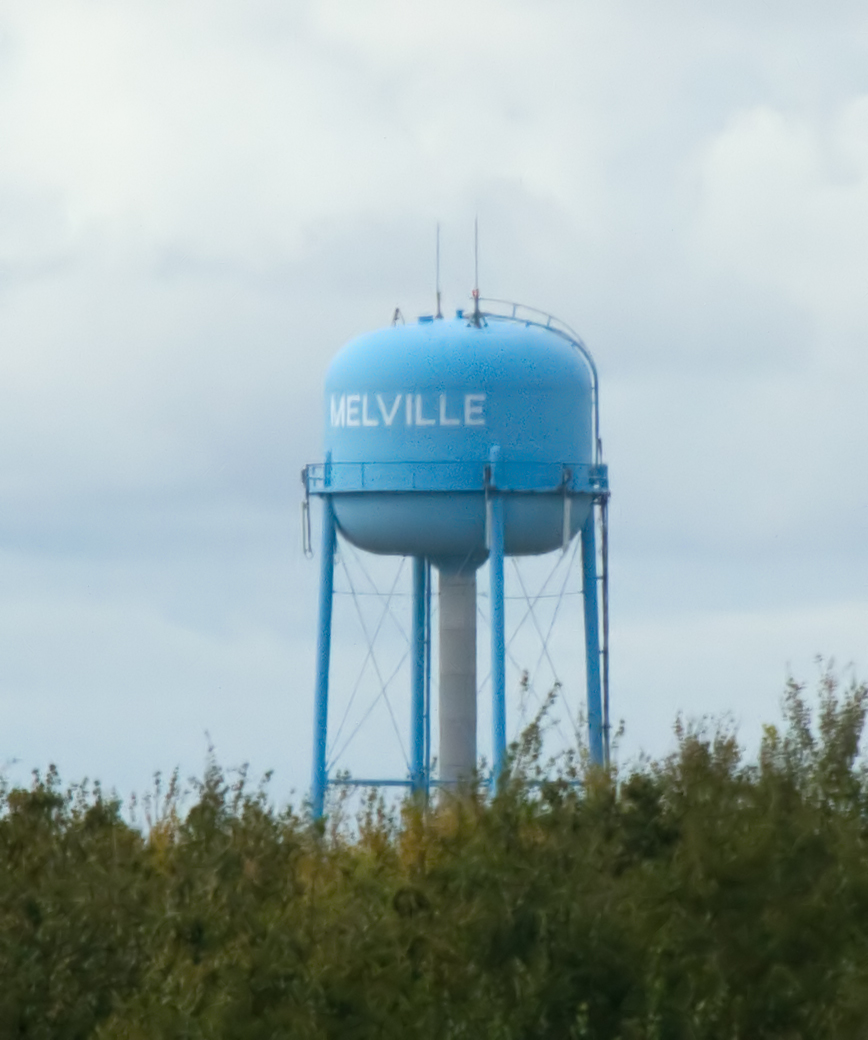
- City of Melville

- Location within Saskatchewan Location within Canada
- Coordinates: 50°55′50″N 102°48′28″W
- Country: Canada
- Province: Saskatchewan
- Provincial Constituency: Melville-Saltcoats
- Federal Electoral District: Yorkton—Melville
- Incorporated Village: 1908
- Incorporated Town: November 1, 1909
- Incorporated City: August 1, 1960
- Founder: Grand Trunk Pacific Railway
- Named for: Charles Melville Hays

Government
  - Mayor: Joe Kirwan
  - MLA: Warren Kaeding
  - MP: Cathay Wagantall

Area
  - Total: 14.82 km^{2} (5.72 sq mi)

Population (2021)
  - Total: 4,493
  - Density: 304/km^{2} (790/sq mi)
- Demonym: Melvillian
- Time zone: UTC−6 (Central Standard Time)
- Highways: Highway 10 / Highway 15 / Highway 47
- Pearl Park Post office established: 1905
- Melville Post office established: July 1, 1908
- Website: melville.ca

Melville is a city in the east-central portion of Saskatchewan, Canada. The city is about 145 kilometres (90 mi) northeast of the provincial capital of Regina and 45 kilometres (28 mi) southwest of Yorkton. Melville is bordered by the rural municipalities of Cana No. 214 and Stanley No. 215. Its population at the 2016 census was 4,562, making it Saskatchewan's smallest city. It is also home of hockey's Melville Millionaires, who compete in the Saskatchewan Junior Hockey League, and baseball's Melville Millionaires, who competed in the Western Canadian Baseball League until 2019.

== History ==
According to What's in a Name?: The Story Behind Saskatchewan Places and Names by E. T. Russell, and People Places: Contemporary Saskatchewan Place Names by Bill Barry, the city was named for Charles Melville Hays, who at the time of the settlement's initial construction was the president of the Grand Trunk Railway and Grand Trunk Pacific Railway. Hays was on board the RMS Titanic when it sank; he did not make it off the ship.

Pearl Park was the area's first post office established in 1905 near Pearl Creek, a tributary of the Qu'Appelle River. Melville was declared a city by the province in 1960.

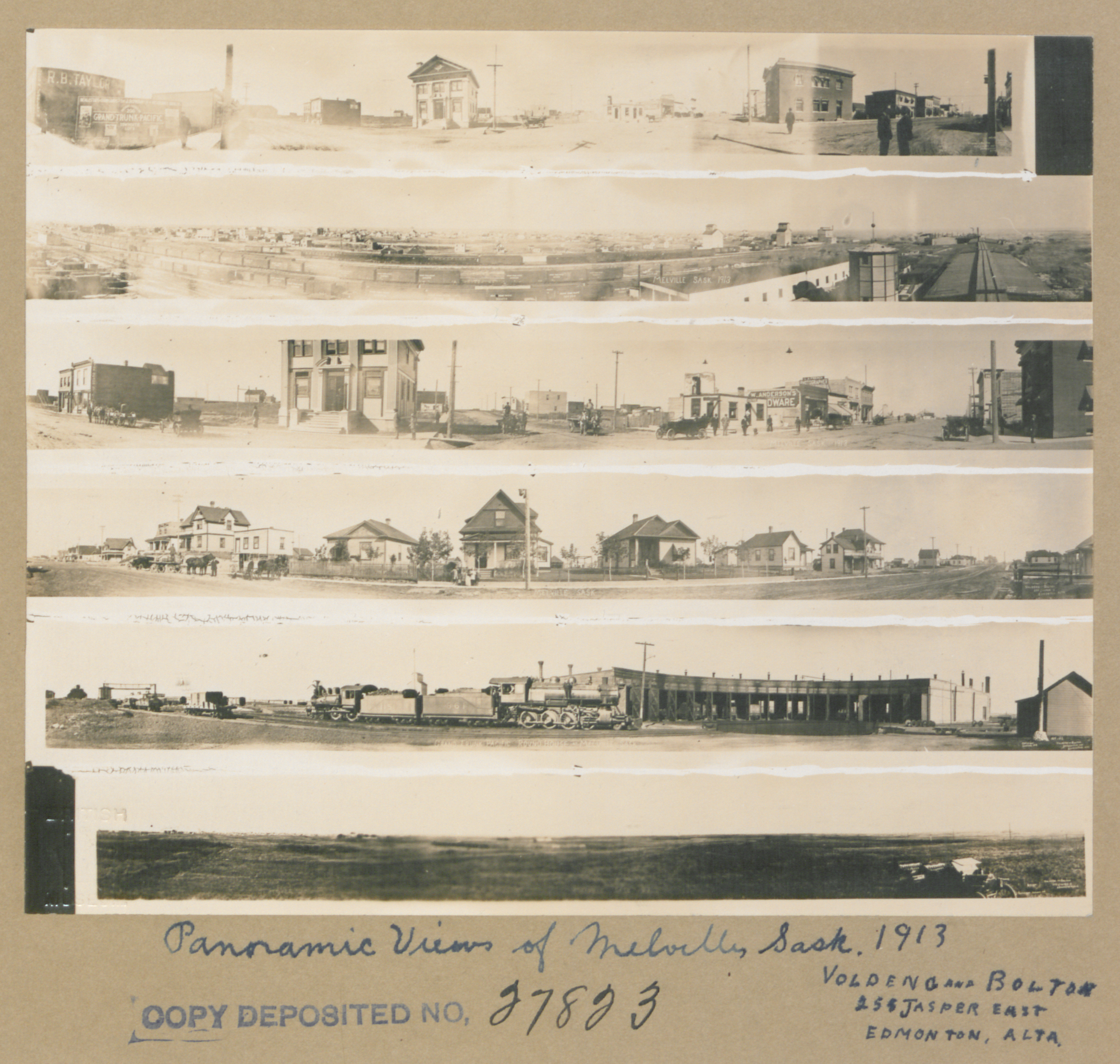
Panoramic views of Melville, 1913

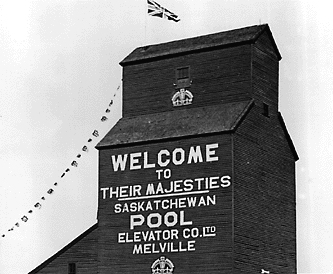
Grain elevator in Melville decorated for the visit of King George VI and Queen Elizabeth in May, 1939

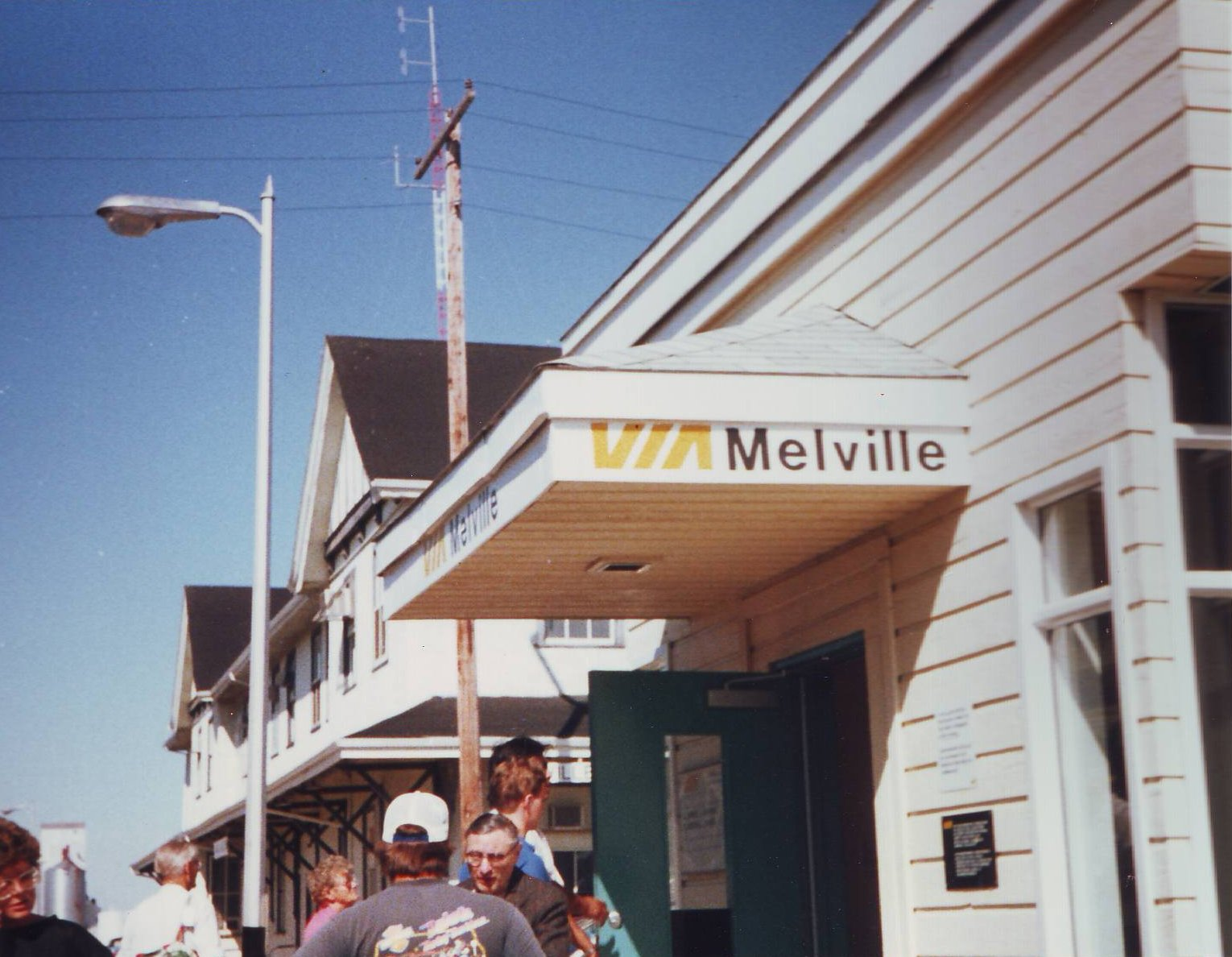
Via Rail railway station in Melville, c. 1991

== Government ==
The mayor of Melville is Joe Kirwan.

Provincially, Melville is within the constituency of Melville-Saltcoats. It is currently represented by Saskatchewan Party MLA Warren Kaeding.

Melville is represented in the House of Commons of Canada by the MP of the Yorkton—Melville riding, currently Cathay Wagantall of the Conservative Party of Canada.

== Demographics ==
In the 2021 Census of Population conducted by Statistics Canada, Melville had a population of 4,493 living in 2,078 of its 2,296 total private dwellings, a change of −1.5% from its 2016 population of 4,562. With a land area of 14.78 km^{2} (5.71 sq mi), it had a population density of 304.0/km^{2} (787.3/sq mi) in 2021.

Canada census – Melville community profile

| | 2021 | 2016 | 2011 |
| Population | 4,493 (-1.5% from 2016) | 4562 (0.4% from 2011) | 4517 (8.9% from 2006) |
| Land area | 14.78 km^{2} (5.71 sq mi) | 14.82 km^{2} (5.72 sq mi) | 14.82 km^{2} (5.72 sq mi) |
| Population density | 304/km^{2} (790/sq mi) | 307.8/km^{2} (797/sq mi) | 304.8/km^{2} (789/sq mi) |
| Median age | 45.2 (M: 44.0, F: 47.2) | | 46.0 (M: 44.7, F: 46.7) |
| Private dwellings | 2,296 (total) 2,078 (occupied) | 2329 (total) | 2000 (total) |
| Median household income | $69,500 |

References: 2021 2016 2011

== Infrastructure ==
Melville's namesake was the president of the Grand Trunk Railway and Grand Trunk Pacific Railway, Charles Melville Hays. Since Melville's founding in 1908, it has served as a nexus for railroad activity, currently including that of Canadian National Railway and Via Rail, the latter for which Melville effectively serves as the main rail-to-bus connection to Regina for its passengers. Today, the transcontinental Canadian train, operated by national passenger rail carrier Via Rail, serves the Melville railway station twice per week eastbound and twice westbound.

In 2002 the St. Peter's Hospital was constructed. St. Peter's was founded in 1940 as a municipal hospital by the Sisters of St. Martha, based in Antigonish, Nova Scotia. Next to St. Peter's is the St. Paul Lutheran Home.

The Melville Railway Museum (c. 1911) is a Municipal Heritage Property on the Canadian Register of Historic Places.

The Melville Heritage Museum is in the original Luther College (formerly Luther Academy) building, built in 1913. The Luther Academy moved to Regina in 1926. After a stint as St. Paul's Home for the Aged and Orphans, the building was declared a heritage site, opening as a museum in the early 1980s.

Melville's connections by road to other communities include Highways 10, 15, and 47. The closest major centre to Melville is the city of Yorkton, 43 kilometres (27 mi) to the northeast.

Melville Municipal Airport (TC LID: CJV9) is located 1.5 NM (2.8 km; 1.7 mi) east of the city.

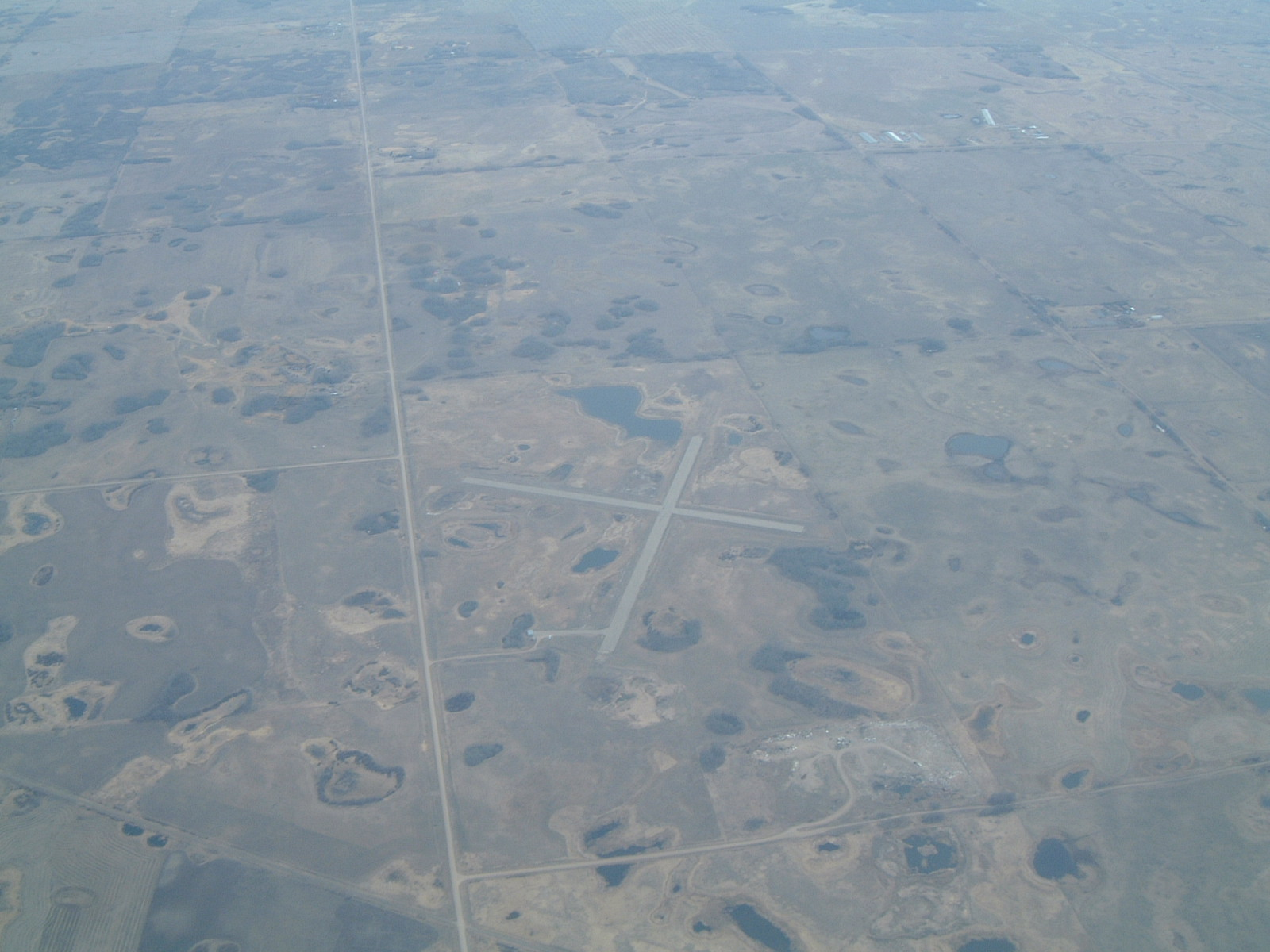
Melville airport

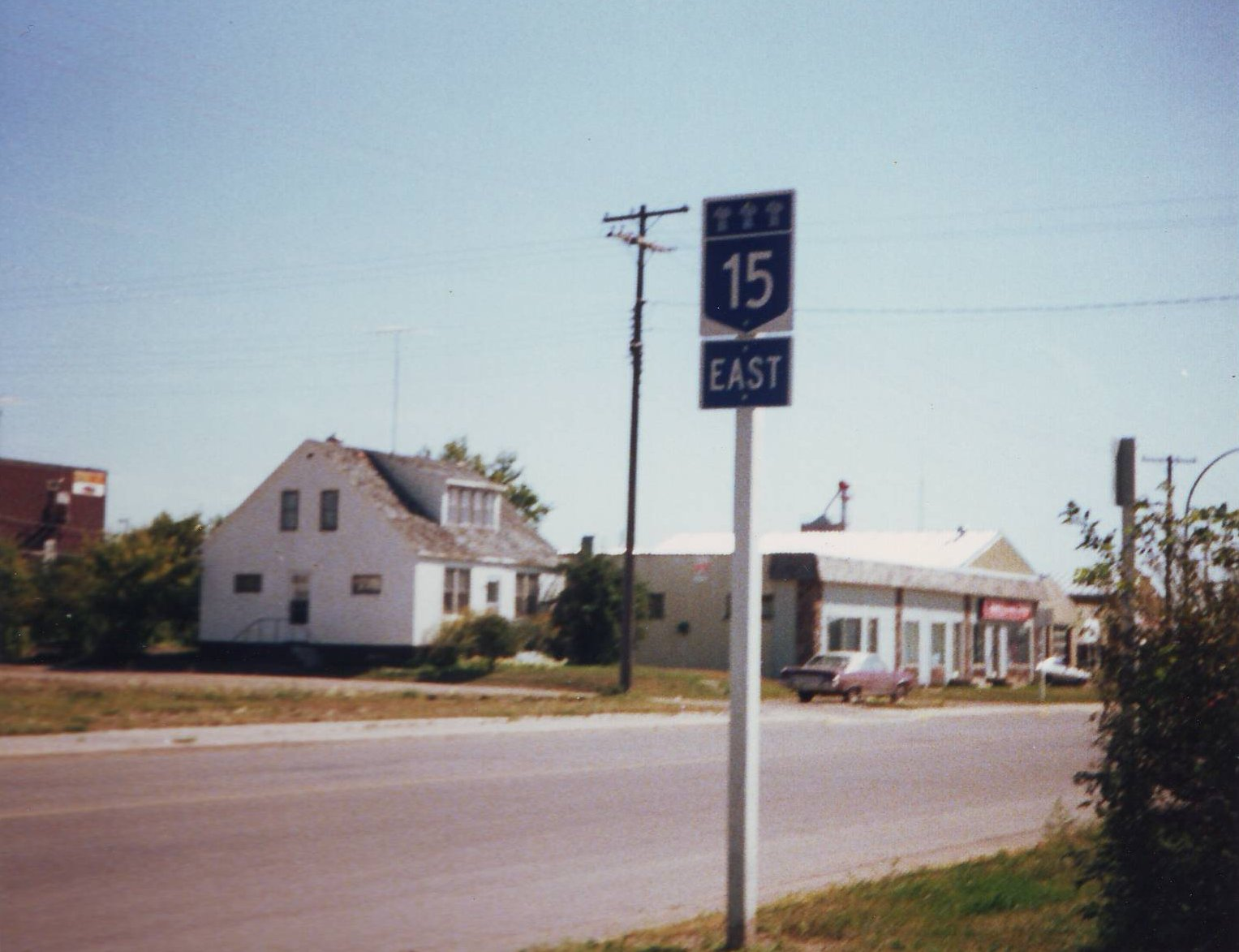
Saskatchewan Highway 15 marker, Melville

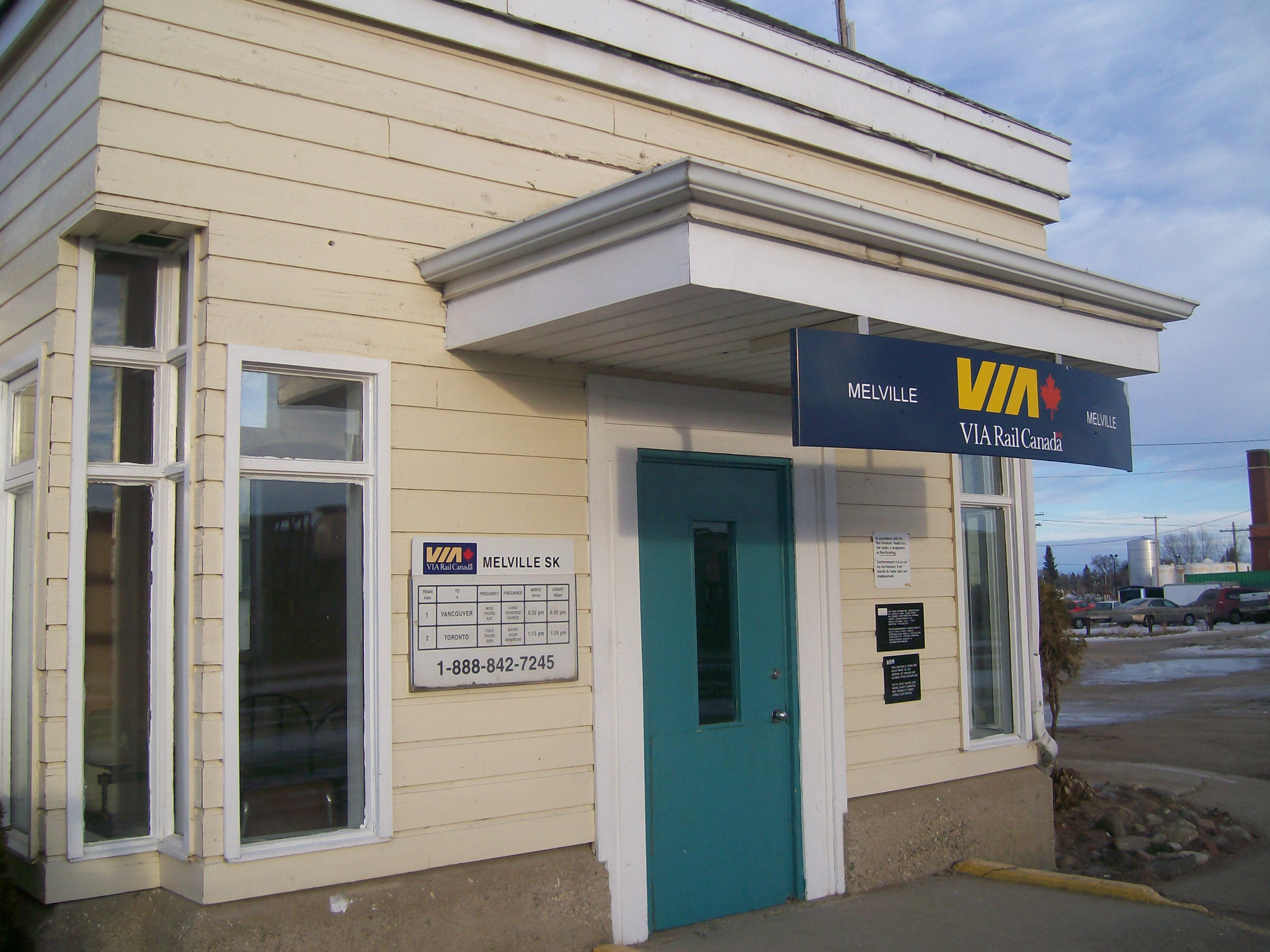
Via Rail railway station in Melville

== Education ==
Melville is served by public and Catholic schools: École St. Henry's Junior Elementary School, and St. Henry's Sr School are both part of the Christ the Teacher Catholic School Division Davison School, as part of the Good Spirit School Division offers pre-kindergarten to grade 6 education. The Melville Comprehensive School, a part of the Good Spirit School Division provides secondary education. Parkland Regional College provides post secondary technical training and operates a campus out of the Melville Comprehensive High School building. Parkland College operates its NFPA fire training field near the Melville Municipal Airport.

== Sports ==
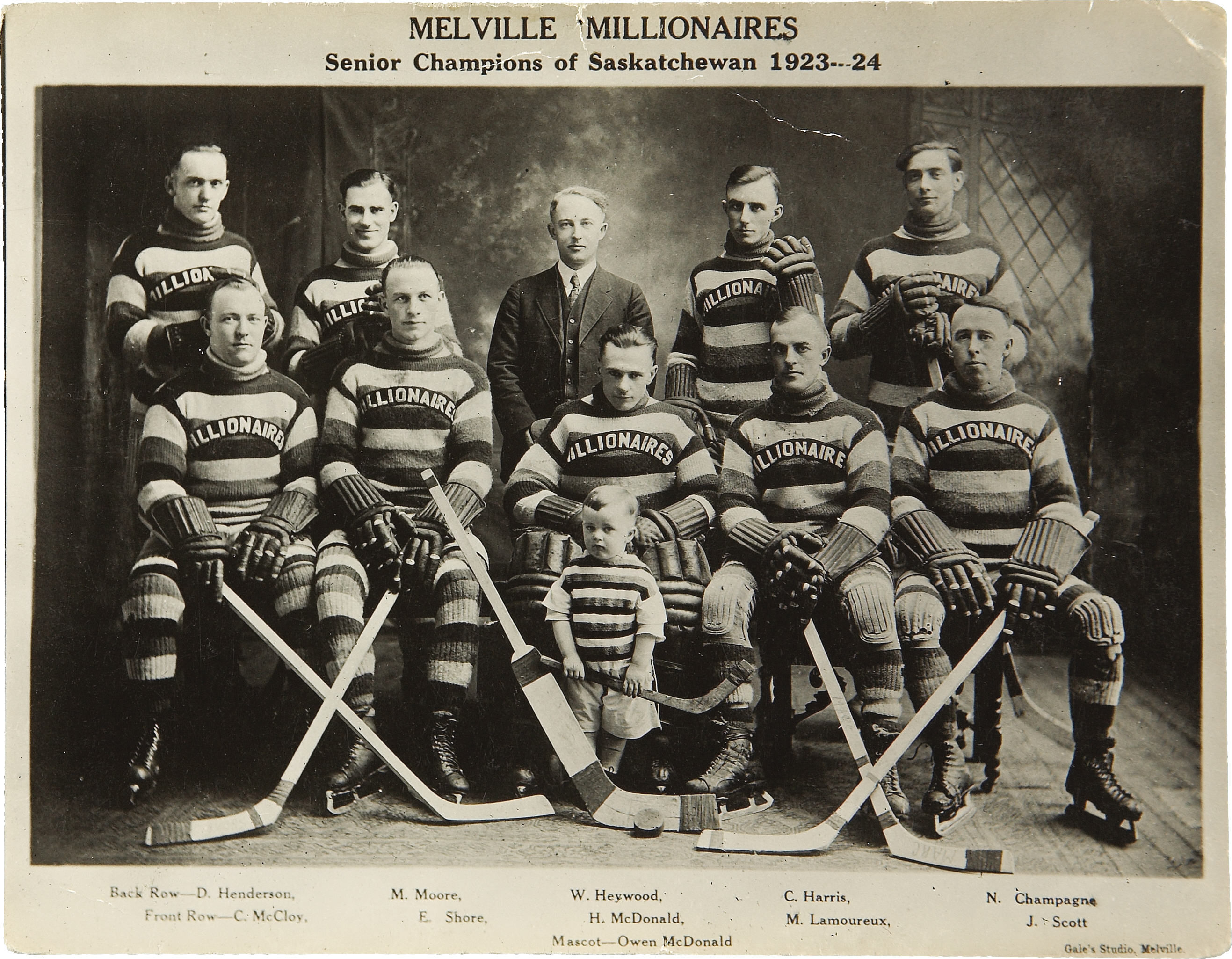
Melville Senior Champions of Saskatchewan, 1923–24

Melville is home to the Melville Millionaires of the Saskatchewan Junior Hockey League, as well as the Melville Millionaires of the Western Canadian Baseball League, who last played in the 2019 season.

In 2011 the Melville Communiplex opened. The federal and provincial governments covered $20 million of the construction costs of the $24.5 million facility. The Communiplex has an NHL size ice surface and seating capacity for 1,500 people, a walking track, fitness and cardio care facilities, and a convention centre. It replaces the existing 60-year-old Melville Stadium, home to the Melville Millionaires. The city also has an 18-hole golf course.

== Media ==
Newspaper

- The Melville Advance, a weekly paper.

Radio

| Frequency | Call sign | Branding | Format | Owner | Notes |
|---|---|---|---|---|---|
| AM 540 | CBK (AM) | CBC Radio One | public broadcasting | Canadian Broadcasting Corporation | Clear-channel station broadcasting from Watrous |
| AM 940 | CJGX | GX94 | country music | Harvard Broadcasting | |
| FM 91.7 | CBK-FM-3 | CBC Music | public broadcasting | Canadian Broadcasting Corporation | Rebroadcaster for CBK-FM |
| FM 92.9 | CJLR-FM-5 | MBC Radio | First Nations community radio | Missinipi Broadcasting Corporation | Rebroadcaster for CJLR-FM |
| FM 94.1 | CFGW-FM | Cruz FM | adult hits | Harvard Broadcasting | |
| FM 98.5 | CJJC-FM | 98.5 The Rock | Christian music | Dennis M. Dyck | |

Television

- CICC-TV Yorkton channel 10, CTV, SNN

== Melville Regional Park ==
Originally founded in the 1960s on "reclaimed wasteland", Melville Regional Park (50.9369°N 102.7961°W) has amenities such as a campground, golf course, outdoor swimming pool, ball diamonds, and the Melville Railway Museum.

The campground has 126 campsites, free firewood, electrical and water hookups, sewer disposal, and modern washrooms and showers. Other amenities at the regional park include cross-country ski trails, horseshoe pits, disk golf, an off-leash dog park, and hiking trails.

The golf course, Melville Golf and Country Club, is an 18-hole, par 70 course. It has a total of 6,055 yards, a licensed clubhouse, and a pro shop. The course is on the north side of Melville and is set on rolling hills with Crescent Creek running through it.

== Popular culture ==
In the film Hannibal Rising (2007), title character Hannibal Lecter shows up in the "hamlet of Melville" in the final scene. However the town depicted is surrounded by forest and is referred to as "near Saskatoon".

== Notable people ==
- George Abel – Olympic gold medalist
- Sid Abel – Hockey Hall of Famer
- Phil Besler – Former NHL player for the Detroit Red Wings
- Bert Blyleven – MLB pitcher, most notably with the Minnesota Twins and member of Baseball Hall of Fame; lived in Melville during childhood
- Evan Carlson – Former Saskatchewan MLA
- Tim Cheveldae – NHL goaltender for the Winnipeg Jets, and Detroit Red Wings
- Jimmy Franks – Former NHL goaltender for the Detroit Red Wings
- Shaun Heshka – NHL player for the Phoenix Coyotes
- Sol Kanee – President of the Canadian Jewish Congress from 1971 to 1974
- Todd McLellan – Head coach of the NHL's Detroit Red Wings
- Mike Morin – Former professional ice hockey player
- Alex Motter – Former NHL player for the Detroit Red Wings
- Terry Puhl – Retired MLB player for the Houston Astros
- Roger Reinson – Retired CFL player, 3-time Grey Cup Champion
- Damon Severson – NHL player for the Columbus Blue Jackets
- Jarret Stoll – Former NHL player for the Edmonton Oilers, Los Angeles Kings, New York Rangers and Minnesota Wild
- Arch Wilder – Former NHL player for the Detroit Red Wings
- Mike Woloschuk – Former curler at men's world championships and two-time gold medalist at Pacific-Asia Curling Championships
- Lyall Woznesensky – Former CFL defensive lineman

== Gallery ==
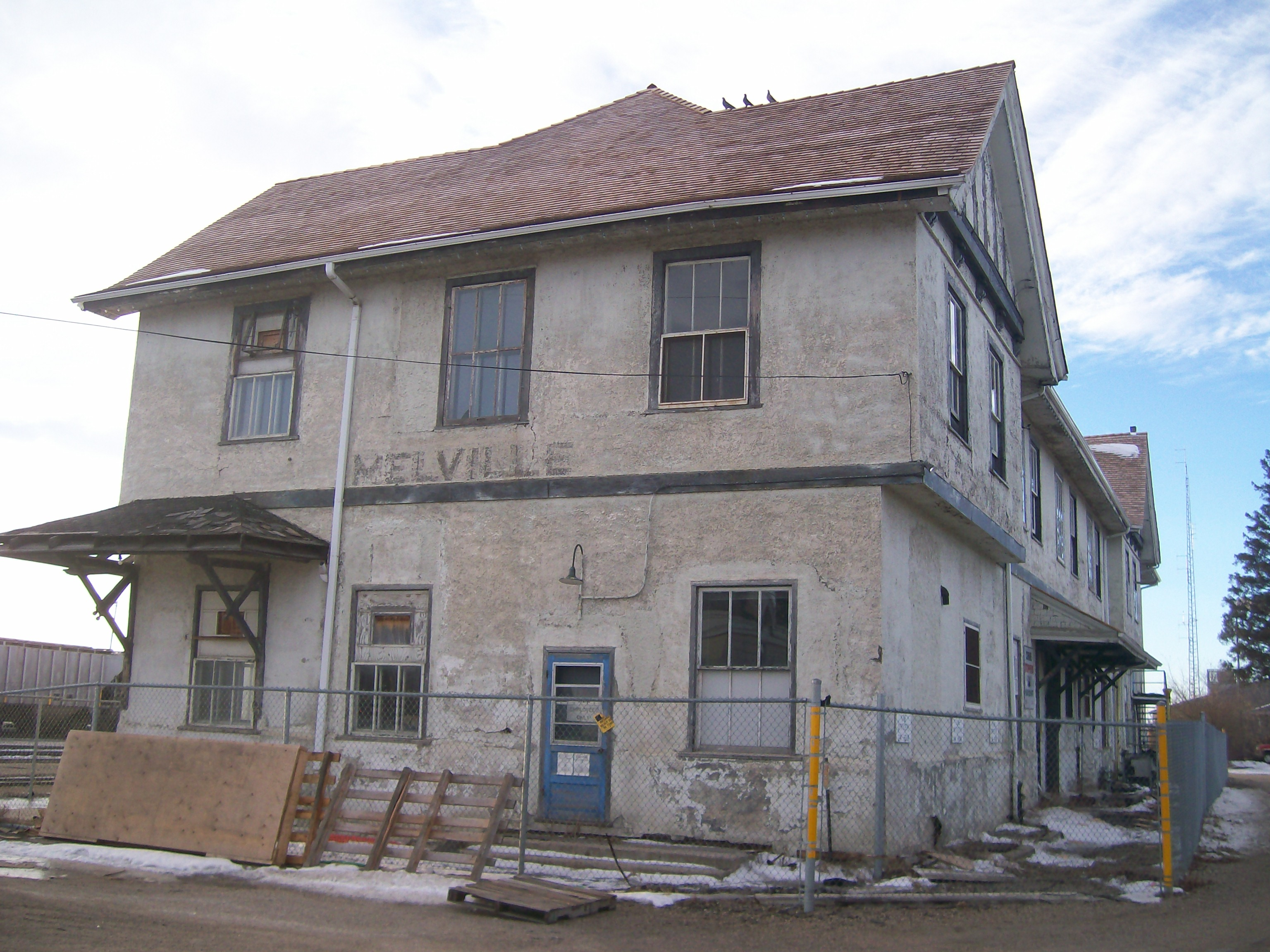
Historic 1908 Canadian National Railway station

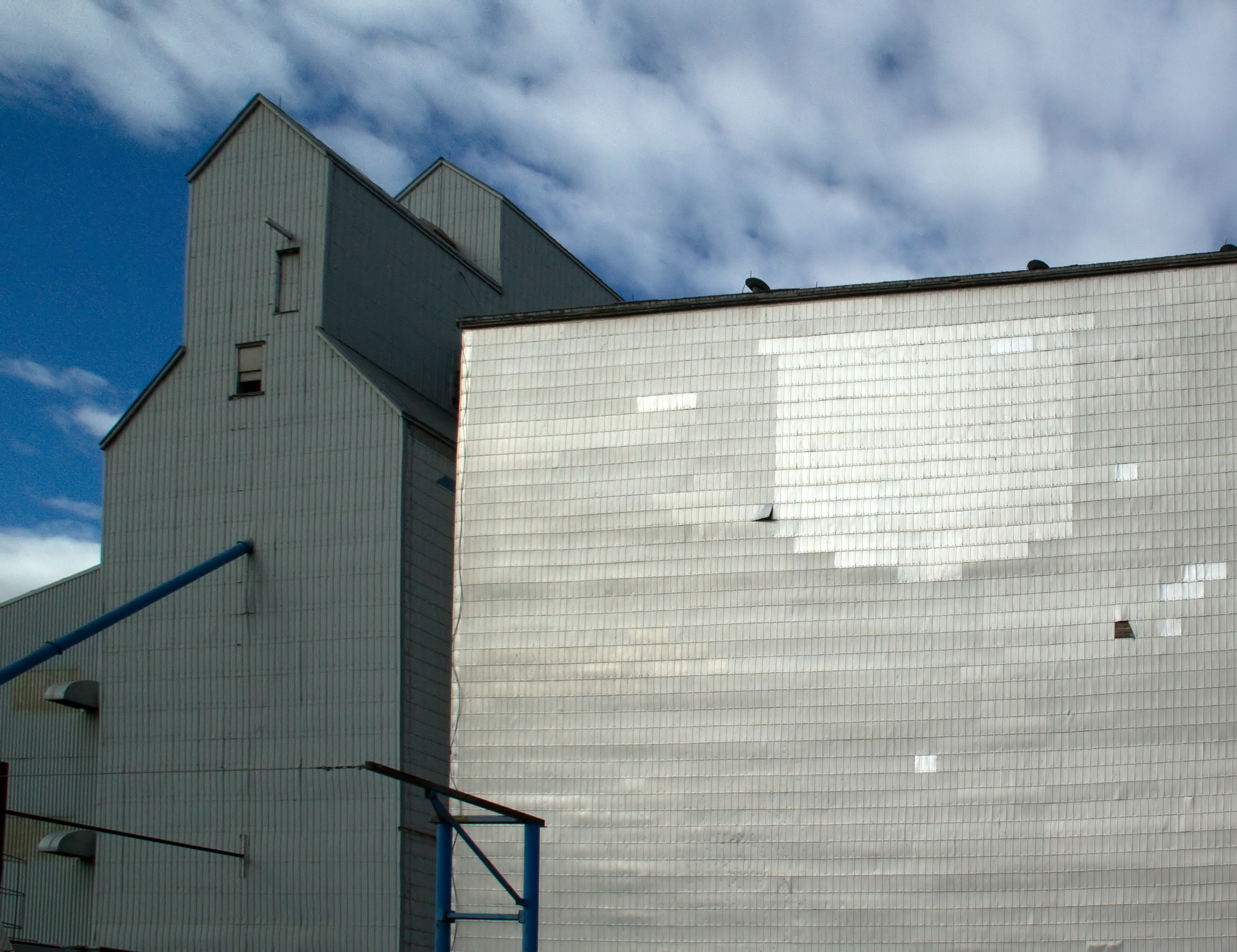
Grain elevator

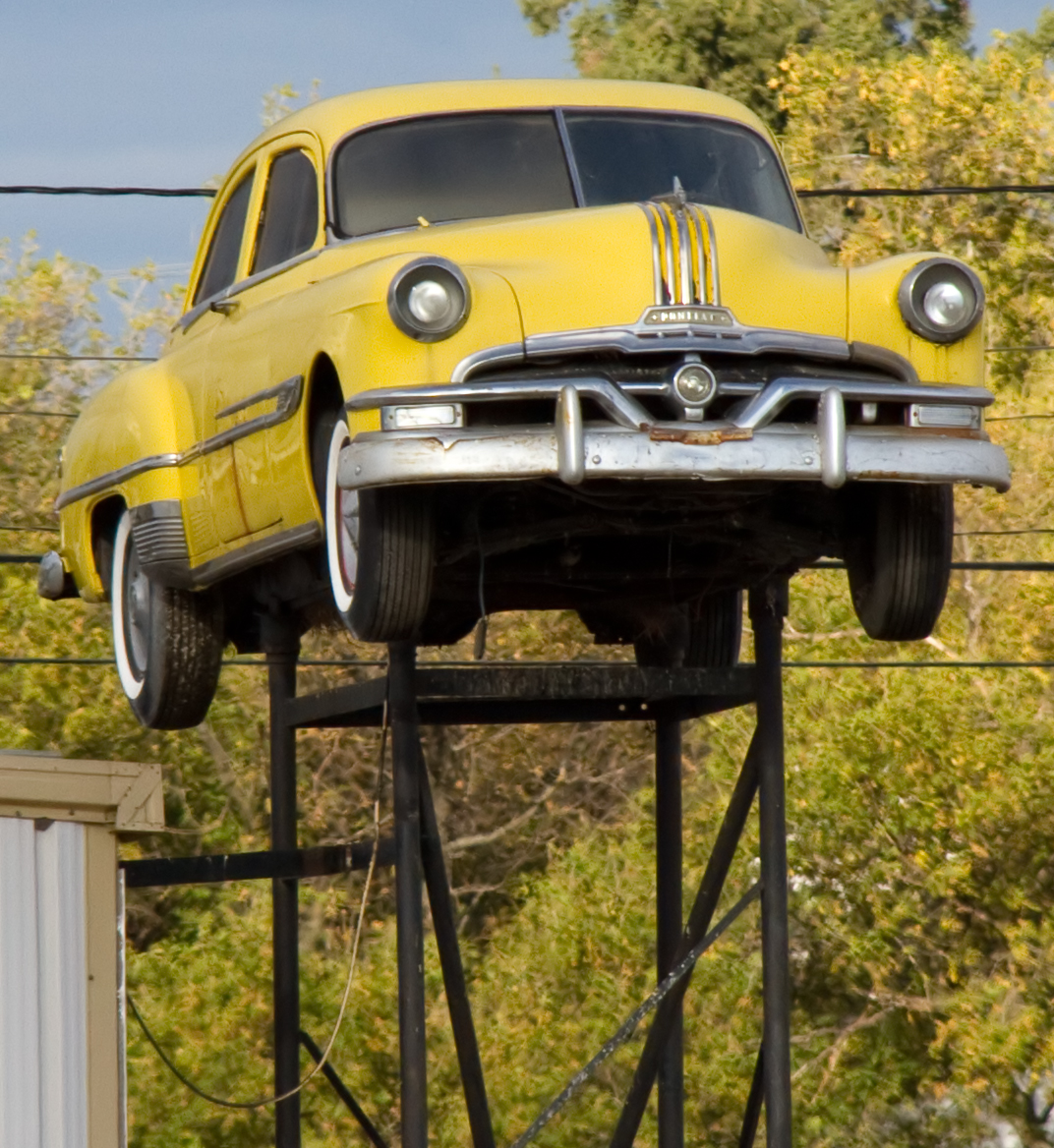
