= Saltcoats, Saskatchewan =

Town in Saskatchewan, Canada

Saltcoats
- Town
- Location of Saltcoats in Saskatchewan Saltcoats (Canada)
- Coordinates: 51°2′0″N 102°10′0″W
- Country: Canada
- Province: Saskatchewan
- Rural Municipality: Saltcoats No. 213
- Post office established: December 1, 1888
- Village organized: April 4, 1894
- Town proclaimed: 1910

Government
  - Mayor: Kirby Buchynski
  - Provincial Constituency MLA: [[]]

Area
  - Land: 1.35 km^{2} (0.52 sq mi)
  - Urban: 2 km^{2} (0.77 sq mi)

Population (2011)
  - Town: 474
  - Density: 352.2/km^{2} (912/sq mi)
- Time zone: UTC+6 (Central Standard Time)
  - Summer (DST): CST
- S0A 3R0: S0A 3R0
- Area code: 306
- Website: Official website

Saltcoats is a town in east-central Saskatchewan near the Manitoba border in Canada. The town's population was 474 in 2011. It was built in the late 19th century, and its economy was driven by the railway. There is no longer a passenger service to the town.

== History ==
The community was established in 1887, just before the arrival of the Manitoba and Northwestern Railway in 1888; a post office was opened when rail service began. In 1894, Saltcoats was the first village incorporated in the North-West Territories as they then were. The town was originally named 'Stirling', but when the railway arrived the name was changed to Saltcoats, after Saltcoats, Scotland, the birthplace of a major railway shareholder and the home port of Allen Steam-ship Lines which brought over many of the immigrants from the British Isles that settled in the region.

In 1902, 208 Welsh settlers (44 families) fleeing unfavourable conditions in Welsh Patagonia came to Saltcoats, but within a generation their community lost its cultural cohesion and melted into the English-speaking cultural matrix.

== Demographics ==
In the 2021 Census of Population conducted by Statistics Canada, Saltcoats had a population of 473 living in 205 of its 227 total private dwellings, a change of −2.3% from its 2016 population of 484. With a land area of 1.35 km^{2} (0.52 sq mi), it had a population density of 350.4/km^{2} (907.5/sq mi) in 2021.

== Government ==
Provincial representation

- Melville - Saltcoats Riding - Warren Kaeding - Saskatchewan Party

Federal representation

- Yorkton Riding - - Conservative Party of Canada

== Saltcoats & District Regional Park ==
Saltcoats & District Regional Park (51.0278°N 102.1561°W) is on the south side of Saltcoats and Anderson Lake. The area had been used since the 1880s as a park and, in 1963, it was established as a regional park. It occupies a quarter section of land and has a campground, sandy beach, boat launch, ball diamonds, picnic area, pavilion, and a concession stand.

== Media ==
The Four-Town Journal covers Saltcoats and area.

== Notable people ==
- The Honourable Gordon Barnhart: Lieutenant-Governor of Saskatchewan (2007–2012)
- The Very Reverend Walter H. Farquharson: internationally noted hymnodist; former moderator of the United Church of Canada
- Ron Liepert, broadcaster, member of the Legislative Assembly of Alberta, Alberta cabinet minister, Member of Parliament
- Joan McCusker: gold medallist in curling (1998 Winter Olympics)

== See also ==
- List of towns in Saskatchewan
