= Saskatchewan Highway 201 =

Provincial highway in Saskatchewan, Canada

Highway 201
- Chief Kahkewistahaw Way

Route information
- Maintained by Ministry of Highways and Infrastructure
- Length: 19.2 km (11.9 mi)

Major junctions
- South end: Highway 1 (TCH) near Broadview
- North end: Highway 247 / Highway 638 near West End

Location
- Country: Canada
- Province: Saskatchewan
- Rural municipalities: Elcapo, Grayson

Highway system
- Provincial highways in Saskatchewan
← Highway 167	→ Highway 202

Highway 201 (also known as Chief Kahkewistahaw Way) is a provincial highway in the Canadian province of Saskatchewan. The highway runs from the Trans-Canada Highway near Broadview north to the Highway 247 / Highway 638 intersection in the Qu'Appelle Valley. Connecting to Highway 247 provides access to Crooked and Round Lakes of the Fishing Lakes in the Qu'Appelle Valley. En route, Highway 201 passes through the Kahkewistahaw First Nation. It is about 19 kilometres (12 mi) long.

On 26 September 2025, Saskatchewan Highways Minister Dave Marit announced the dual designation of Highway 201 as 'Highway 201 Chief Kahkewistahaw Way' to honour Chief Kahkewistahaw, one of the original signors of Treaty 4.

== Route description ==
Hwy 201 begins in the Rural Municipality of Elcapo No. 154 at a junction with Hwy 1 (Trans-Canada Highway) just east of the town of Broadview, with the road continuing south as Range Road 2045. It heads north past the Trans-Canada's Broadview Rest Area to travel through rural farmland for several kilometres to have an intersection with Jacob Bear Road, which provides access to the Ochapowace Nation Ochapowace 71 reserve, as it enters the Kahkewistahaw First Nation, forming the main thoroughfare for their Kahkewistahaw 72 reserve. The highway now winds its way down into the Qu'Appelle River valley, crossing the river halfway between Crooked Lake and Round Lake as it enters the Rural Municipality of Grayson No. 184 and comes to an end shortly thereafter at an intersection with Hwy 247, with the road continuing north as Hwy 638. The entire length of Hwy 201 is a paved, two-lane highway.

== Major intersections ==
From south to north:

Rural municipality	Location	km	mi	Destinations	Notes
Elcapo No. 154		0.0	0.0	Highway 1 (TCH) – Winnipeg, Regina	Southern terminus; road continues south as Range Road 2045
Elcapo No. 154		0.1	0.062	Trans-Canada Highway Broadview Rest Area	
Elcapo No. 154	Kahkewistahaw 72	12.0	7.5	Jacob Bear Road – Ochapowace 71	
Elcapo No. 154 / Grayson No. 184 boundary		18.6	11.6	Bridge over the Qu'Appelle River	
Grayson No. 184		19.2	11.9	Highway 247 – Crooked Lake Provincial Park, Sunset Beach, West End, Round Lake Highway 638 north – Dubuc	Northern terminus; southern terminus of Hwy 638
1.000 mi = 1.609 km; 1.000 km = 0.621 mi

== See also ==
- Transportation in Saskatchewan
- Roads in Saskatchewan
