= Saskatchewan Highway 247 =

Provincial highway in Saskatchewan, Canada

Highway 247

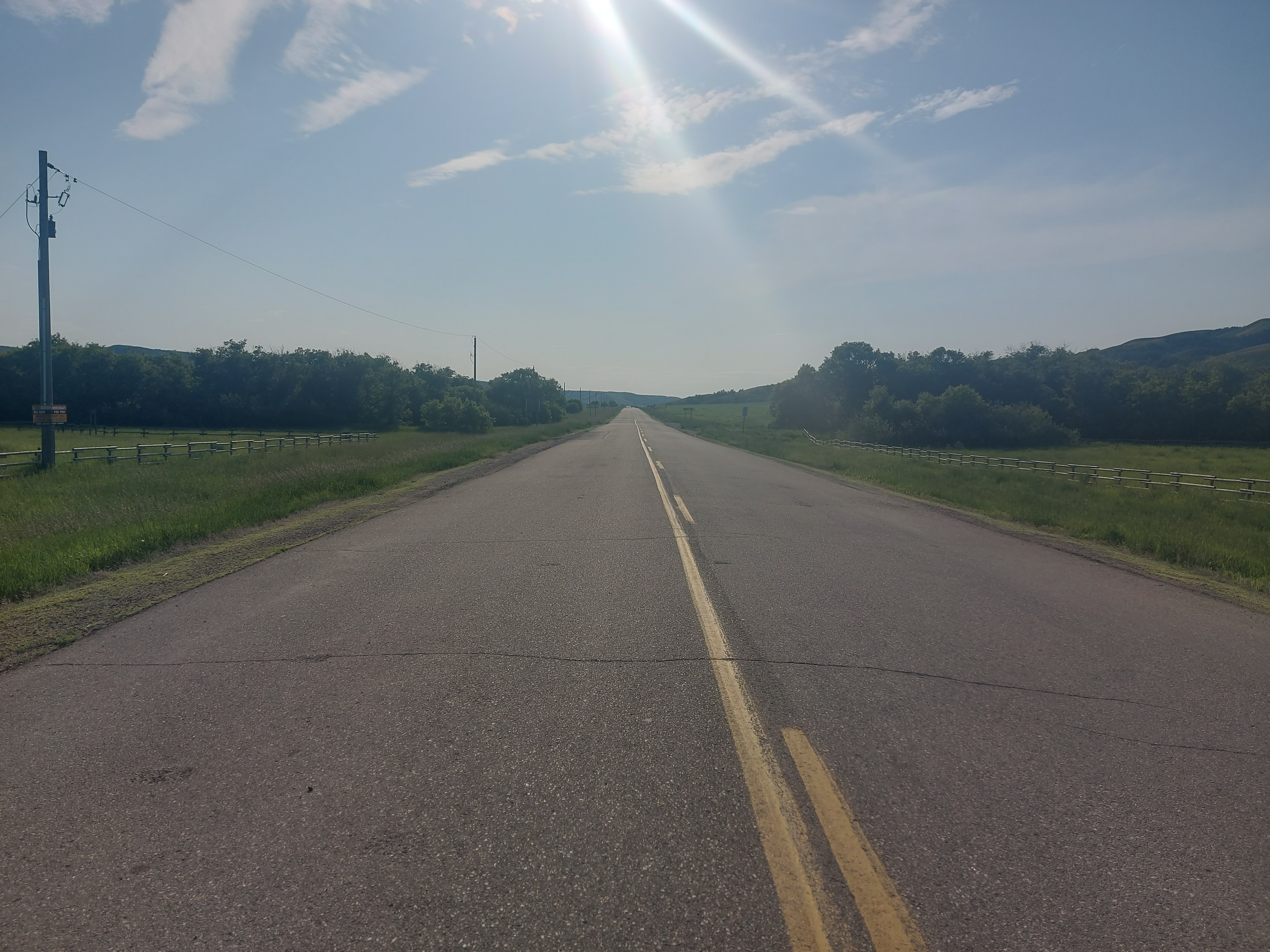
- Highway 247

Route information
- Maintained by Ministry of Highways and Infrastructure
- Length: 49.7 km (30.9 mi)

Major junctions
- West end: Highway 47 near Melville Beach
- Highway 201 / Highway 638 near West End
- East end: Highway 9 near Stockholm

Location
- Country: Canada
- Province: Saskatchewan
- Rural municipalities: Grayson, Fertile Belt

Highway system
- Provincial highways in Saskatchewan
← Highway 240	→ Highway 255

Highway 247 is a provincial highway in the Canadian province of Saskatchewan. Saskatchewan's 200-series highways primarily service its recreational areas. The highway follows the course of the Qu'Appelle River running east from Highway 47 to Highway 9. It is about 50 kilometres (31 mi) long.

Along Highway 247's route, it passes by Crooked and Round Lakes, passes through Crooked Lake Provincial Park, and provides access to several communities along the north bank of the river.

== Route description ==
Highway 247 begins in the Rural Municipality of Grayson No. 184 at a junction with Highway 47 roughly halfway between Grenfell and Melville. It heads southeast along the north bank of the Qu'Appelle River to travel through a section of the Zagime Anishinabek First Nation and Grenfell Beach before curving northeast and passing through Melville Beach. Travelling along the northern coastline of Crooked Lake, the highway passes through Exner's Twin Bays, Moose Bay, Crooked Lake Provincial Park, and Sunset Beach before meeting Highway 605 at a junction with near the lake's mouth on the river. Continuing to trudge southeast through the Qu'Appelle Valley, having an intersection with Highway 201 / Highway 638 before travelling along the north side of Round Lake, where it passes through West End, enters the Rural Municipality of Fertile Belt No. 183, and travels through both Pelican Shores and Bird's Point. Just a few short kilometres later, Highway 247 comes to an end at a junction with Highway 9 (Saskota Flyway), just 0.3 kilometres (0.19 mi) south of that highway's intersection with Highway 637. The entire length of Highway 247 is a paved, two lane highway.

== Major intersections ==
From west to east:

Rural municipality	Location	km	mi	Destinations	Notes
Grayson No. 184		0.0	0.0	Highway 47 – Grenfell, Melfort	Western terminus
Grayson No. 184		18.9	11.7	Highway 605 – Grayson, Broadview	
Grayson No. 184		28.9	18.0	Highway 201 south – Broadview Highway 638 north – Dubuc	
Fertile Belt No. 183		49.7	30.9	Highway 9 (Saskota Flyway) – Yorkton, Whitewood To Highway 637 east – Esterhazy	Eastern terminus
1.000 mi = 1.609 km; 1.000 km = 0.621 mi

== See also ==
- Transportation in Saskatchewan
- Roads in Saskatchewan
