= Grenfell, Saskatchewan =

Town in Saskatchewan, Canada

Town of Grenfell
- Town
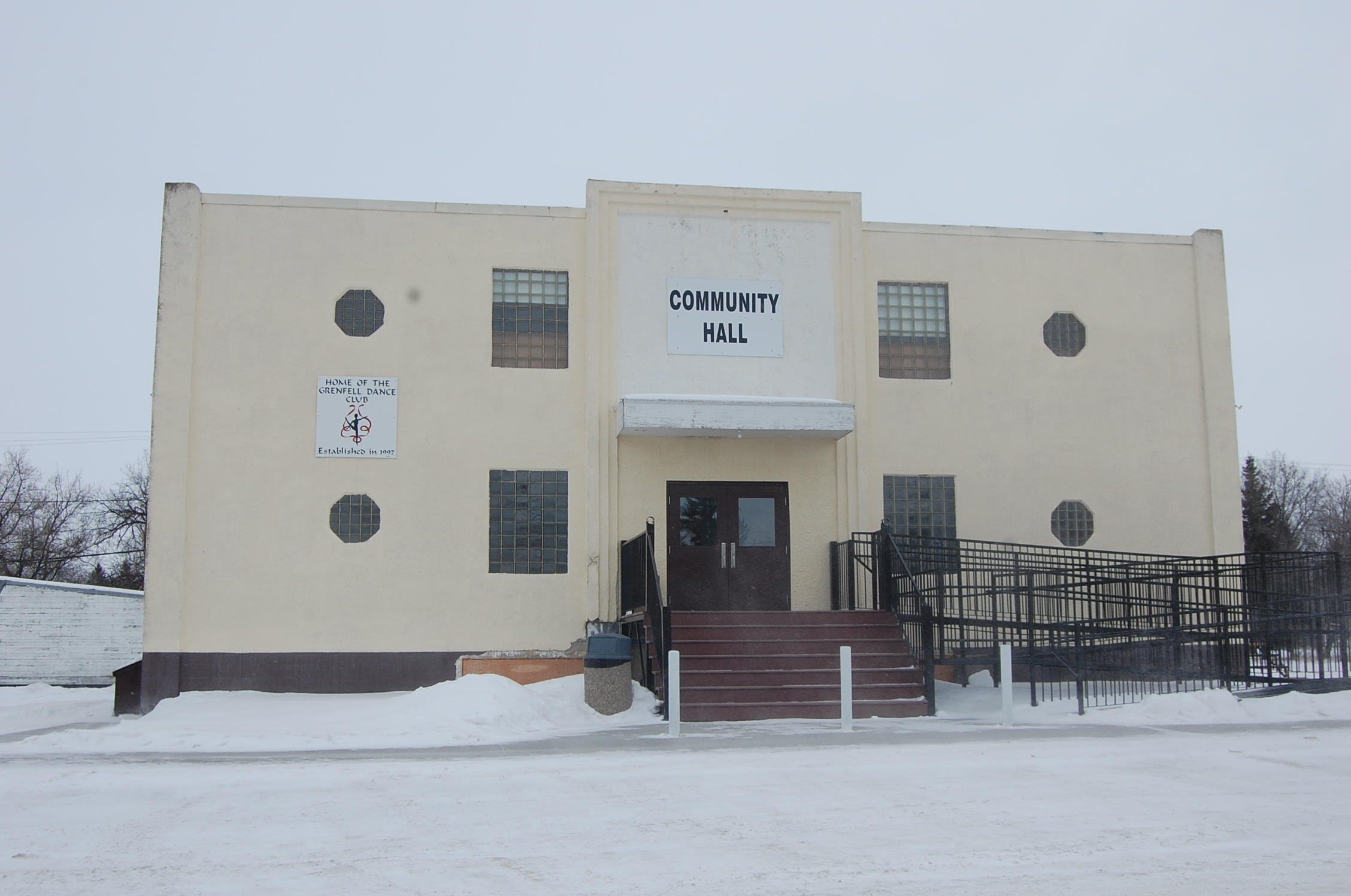
- Community Hall

- Location within Saskatchewan Location within Canada
- Coordinates: 50.416667°N 102.933333°W
- Country: Canada
- Province: Saskatchewan
- Rural Municipality: Elcapo No. 154
- Post office Founded: 1883
- Incorporated (village): 1894
- Incorporated (town): 1911

Government
  - Mayor: Mark Steininger

Area
  - Total: 3.17 km^{2} (1.22 sq mi)

Population (2016)
  - Total: 1,099
  - Density: 347/km^{2} (900/sq mi)
- Time zone: CST
- Postal code: S0G 2B0
- Area code: 306
- Highways: Highway 1 (TCH) / Highway 47 / Highway 616
- Website: townofgrenfell.com

Grenfell (Canada 2016 Census population 1,098.5) is a town in Southern Saskatchewan, Canada. It is at the junction of Highway 47 and the Trans-Canada Highway 1 130 kilometres (80 mi) east of Regina, the provincial capital. It is 24 kilometres (15 mi) south of the Qu'Appelle Valley where Crooked Lake Provincial Park (at Crooked Lake) and Bird's Point Resort (at Round Lake) are popular beach destinations and are accessed by Highway 47.

European settlement from Ontario and the British Isles began in 1882 before the Canadian Pacific Railway reached the site of the town, and "the town's name honours Pasco du Pre Grenfell, a railway company official." The post office was established in 1883.

== History ==
The settlement was the result of the westward expansion of the Canadian Pacific Railway and the town is named after Pasco du P. Grenfell, an early shareholder of the railway company and a prominent railwayman. Initial settlement was from eastern Canada and the British Isles, followed shortly thereafter by Germans.

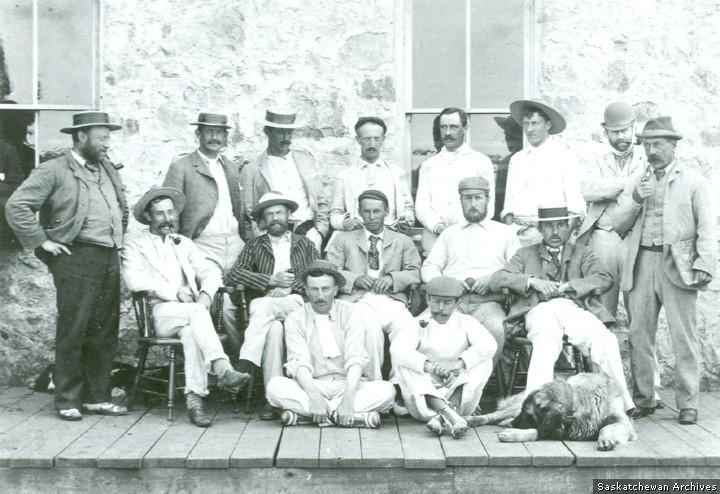
The Grenfell cricket team, c. 1890. With many English immigrants it was cricket that was the more popular pastime, rather than baseball. While popular in the early days, its influence did not last.

Grenfell was incorporated as a town in 1911.

The community sent men to war in both the First and Second World Wars. They are remembered at the local cenotaph.

As in many other prairie towns, Chinese railworkers from the building of the CPR in the 1880s settled down and established local businesses: as late as the 1960s there were two Chinese cafés on Main Street.

The town has long been known for cultural vitality; in 1974 the University of Saskatchewan, Regina Campus choir gave a concert in the Community Hall with the audience filling the hall, students accommodated by town and farm families. Eminent provincial academics, lawyers, medical doctors, lieutenant-governors, musicians and artists either came from or spent time working in Grenfell.

== Geography ==
Grenfell is in the Indian Head Plain of the Aspen Parkland ecoregion on the parkland of the Qu'Appelle flood plain. Grenfell is within the topographical area of Weed Hills. The bedrock geology belongs to that of the Mannville Group, a stratigraphical unit of Cretaceous age in the Western Canadian Sedimentary Basin formed during the lower Cretaceous period. The area is characterised by lush rolling grasslands, interspersed with poplar bluffs (in prairie Canadian terminology poplar groves surrounding sloughs) and open sloughs.

=== Climate ===
Grenfell has a humid continental climate. It has warm summers and cold winters. Snow cover generally lasts from November to March.

== Demographics ==
Historical Population
Year	Pop.	±%
1901	452	—
1906	677	+49.8%
1910	709	+4.7%
1916	873	+23.1%
1996	1,106	+26.7%
2001	1,067	−3.5%
2006	947	−11.2%
2011	1,049	+10.8%
2016	1,098.5	+4.7%

In the 2021 Census of Population conducted by Statistics Canada, Grenfell had a population of 1,105.2 living in 483 of its 550 total private dwellings, a change of −3.6% from its 2016 population of 1,098.5. With a land area of 3.14 km^{2} (1.21 sq mi), it had a population density of 337.3/km^{2} (873.5/sq mi) in 2021.

Of the current adult population in 2006, 43.7 per cent were male and 55.8 per cent were female. Children under five accounted for approximately 1.6 per cent of the resident population of Grenfell.

According to data from 2001, more than 12.1% of the town's residents identify themselves as Catholic; 37.5% of residents are Protestant, 4.2% are Christian and 3.2% of residents do not practise a religion.

Whereas, the first settlers were from the British Isles and eastern Canada, later immigrants from Germany would also settle here.

Canada census – Grenfell community profile

	2021	2016	2011
Population	1,105.2. (-3.6% from 2016)	1,098.5 (+4.8% from 2011)	1,049 (+10.8% from 2006)
Land area	3.14 km^{2} (1.21 sq mi)	3.17 km^{2} (1.22 sq mi)	3.17 km^{2} (1.22 sq mi)
Population density	337.2/km^{2} (873/sq mi)	347.0/km^{2} (899/sq mi)	331.2/km^{2} (858/sq mi)
Median age	48.8 (M: 46.0, F: 52.0)	49.4 (M: 45.7, F: 52.8)	54.4 (M: 51.3, F: 56.1)
Private dwellings	550 (total) 483 (occupied)	541 (total)	528 (total)
Median household income	$65,500	$31,936

References: 2021 2016 2011

== Government ==
The town of Grenfell has a mayor as the highest ranking government official. The town also elects aldermen or councillors to form the municipal council. Currently the mayor is Mark Steininger and is serving with councillors Dwayne Stone, Bill Robinson, Leslie McGhie, Troy Steininger, Dale Hardy and Kim Limeaux. The Chief Administrative Officer is Deanne Robbles

Provincially, Grenfell is within the constituency of Moosomin served by their Member of legislative assembly, the honourable Steven Bonk.

Federally, the Souris—Moose Mountain riding is represented by their Member of Parliament, .

== Commerce ==
By 1915, Grenfell hosted a flour mill company, one of 37 across the province.

The CPR employed hundreds of Chinese labourers on its incremental westward growth from Ontario to British Columbia throughout the 1880s. Once the railroad was complete many Chinese returned to railroad towns like Grenfell to establish cafés and groceries which persisted until the latter part of the twentieth century. Well into that time Grenfell was served by two such Chinese cafés and groceries which considerably contributed to the amenity of its business district. Grenfell also had a women's clothing store on Main Street and the provisions of a bakeshop and movie theatre on Front Street well into the 1960s.

A cinema on Front Avenue opposite the railway line continued in business until the 1960s, much beyond the time when such facilities had lapsed in other, larger prairie towns which were closer to urban metropoles. No doubt this was in part because television transmission remained poor, Grenfell being a good 121 kilometres (75 mi) east of the broadcast locus in Regina. However they might have regretted the lack of choice, community life was assuredly enhanced by first-release films being available only in the town cinema.

Access to both Regina and somewhat less quickly Winnipeg became vastly more convenient and fast with the great improvement in quality of the Trans-Canada Highway, even substantially eliminating the demand for train passenger transport. This constituted both an improvement in town and farm dwellers' overall quality of life but decline in its nature within the town without a lengthy drive. As in virtually all prairie Canadian towns, the centre of commerce was from the beginning until very recently the grain elevators: assorted grain-buying companies maintained large depots to which farmers regularly brought wheat and other crops for sale whenever the centralised grain-buying board announced a quota.

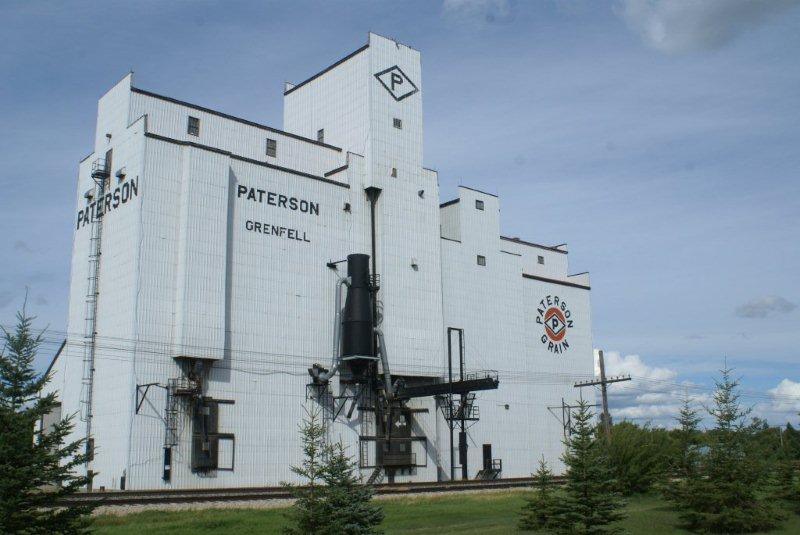
A Grenfell grain elevator remaining in 2011, one of several once in regular use.

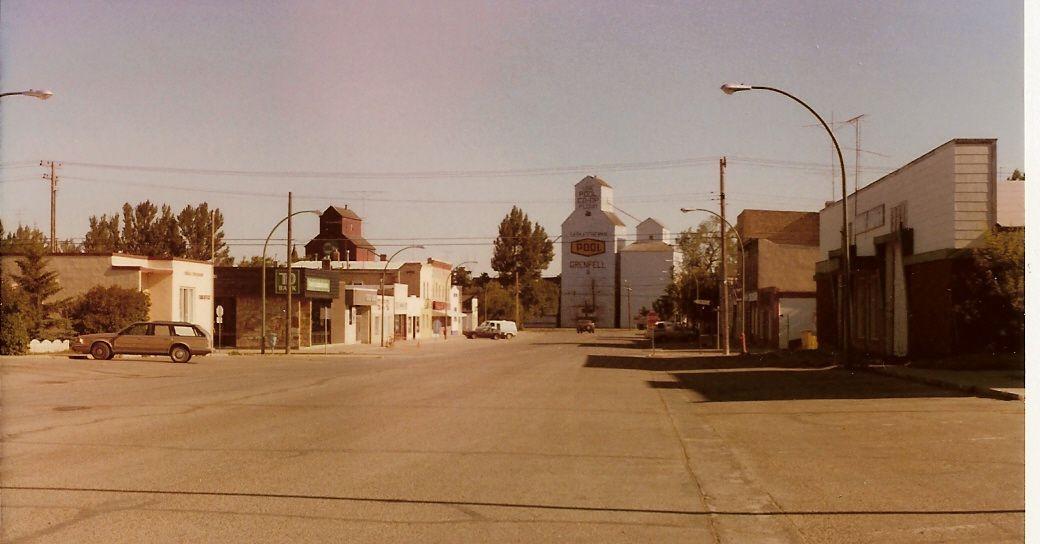
Main Street, Grenfell, 1980. Note grain elevators, from the outset of settlement the predominating feature of prairie towns; now long removed.

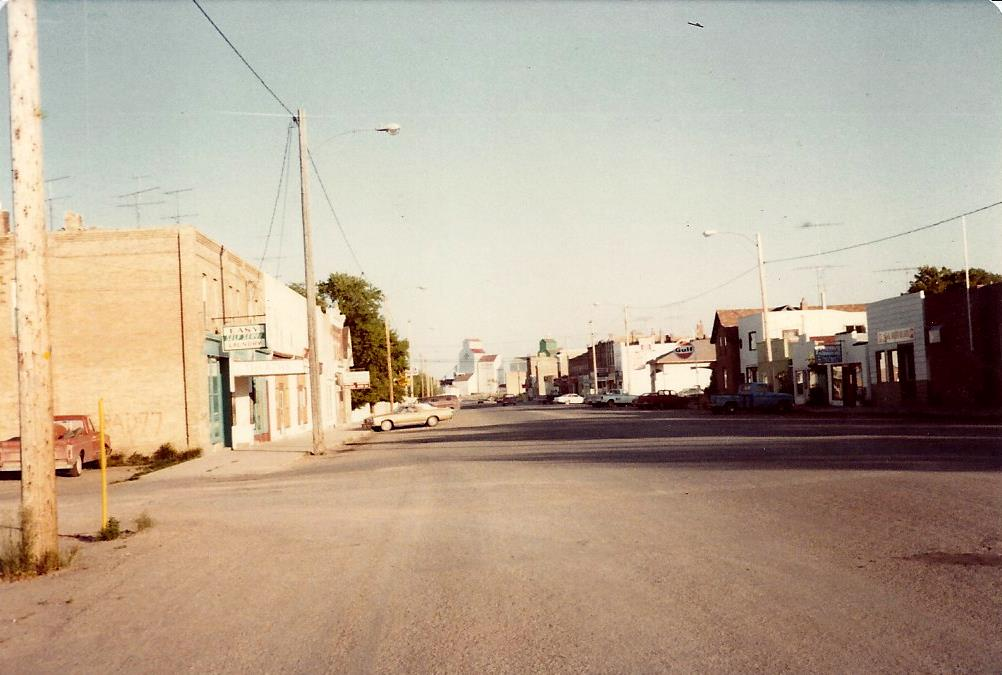
Main Street, Grenfell, circa 1975

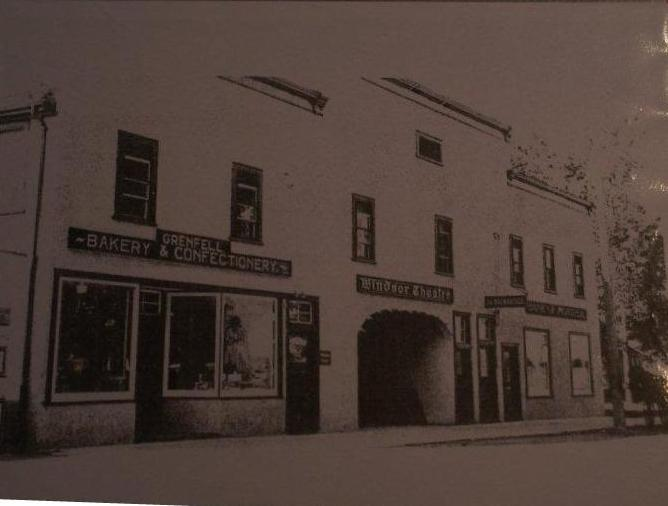
Windsor Theatre and bakery still in use pre-1947.

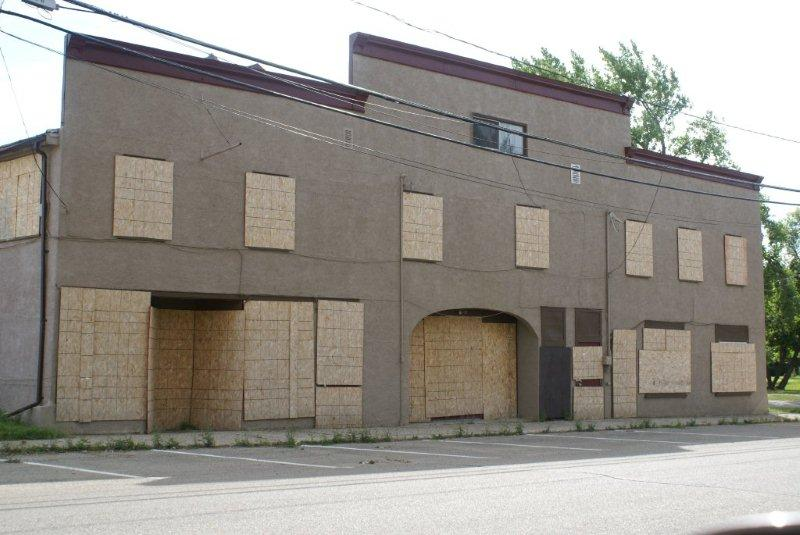
Front Avenue, Grenfell, 2011. Bakery and theatre building after closure.

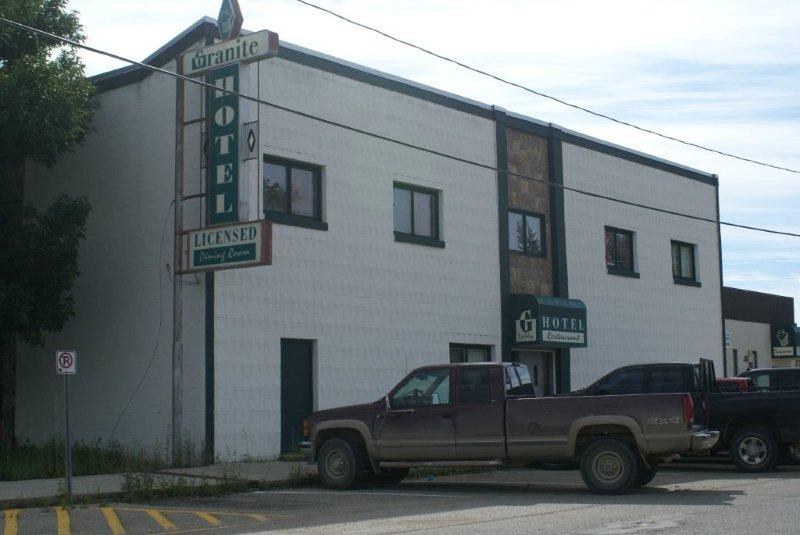
A Grenfell hotel and restaurant in 2011 succeeding two Chinese restaurants and demonstrating transformation in town life since access to the city has become vastly easier.

== Infrastructure ==
Grenfell's hospital was first established in 1915, followed by a maternity home in 1933. The hospital in Grenfell was one of 52 hospital closures announced April 15, 1993, by Health Minister Louise Simard. Grenfell belongs to the Regina Qu'Appelle Health Region, and a hospital is within a 10-minute drive. The Grenfell Medical Centre is staffed with a doctor, emergency room, lab and x-ray department. As well Grenfell is home to the Grenfell and District Pioneer Home providing health care for senior citizens of the area.

=== Transportation ===
Grenfell is at the junction of Highway 47 and the Trans-Canada Highway about 130 kilometres (80 mi) east of Regina. By 2004, the Trans-Canada Highway had been "twinned" from Alberta all the way eastward to Grenfell. The entire highway was divided by 2007.

The Canadian Pacific Railway came through in October 1882. Shacks and tents appeared the following spring allowing the village to incorporate on April 12, 1894, with over 100 residents. It was reorganised in 1967 becoming the Grenfell Branch of the South East Regional Library. Grenfell was on the CPR West line between Regina and Winnipeg, Manitoba. The line ran through Indian Head, Sintaluta, Wolseley, Summerberry then Grenfell and continues west through Oakshela, Broadview. It is here that in 1925, the time zone changed from Central Standard Time to Mountain Standard Time.

== Education ==
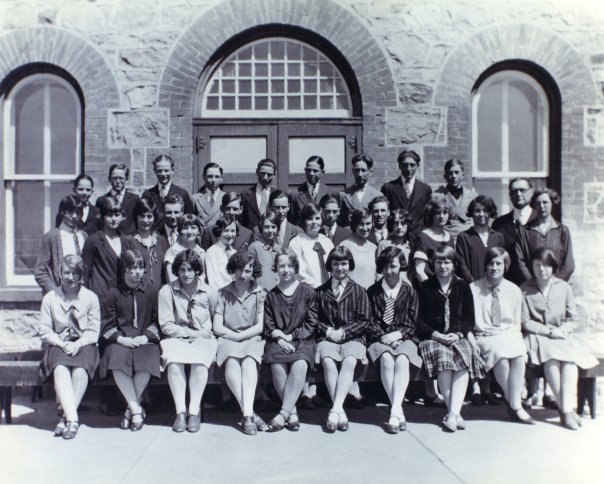
Grenfell High School c. 1925

MacPherson School, north of town, c. 1925

Grenfell is home to the Mechanic's Library Institute which was established in 1882 being one of the province's oldest libraries.

Grenfell Elementary Community School offers pre-school to grade 6 with an enrolment near 160 pupils. Grenfell High Community School offers grade 7 to grade 12 to an enrolment of about 134 students. Both a part of the Prairie Valley School Division #208.

Historically several one-room school houses served Grenfell and area. Faulkner School District #53 was one of the first established in 1886 followed by Rillington #62, and Prospect #65. Grenfell #150 was located south of the town site. Le Cain #224, Tetlock #289, Brown Hill #353, Arlington #429, Sims #432, Wolf Hills #823, Gettel #1904, and Oakshela #2458 came next serving the community until the 1950s. By the 1960s only two of every former one-room schoolhouses were still in use.

== Churches ==
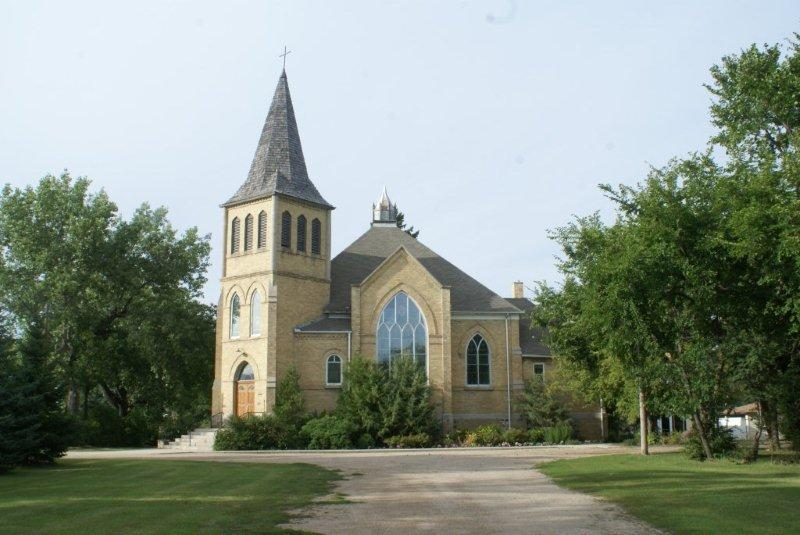
Grenfell United Church 2011

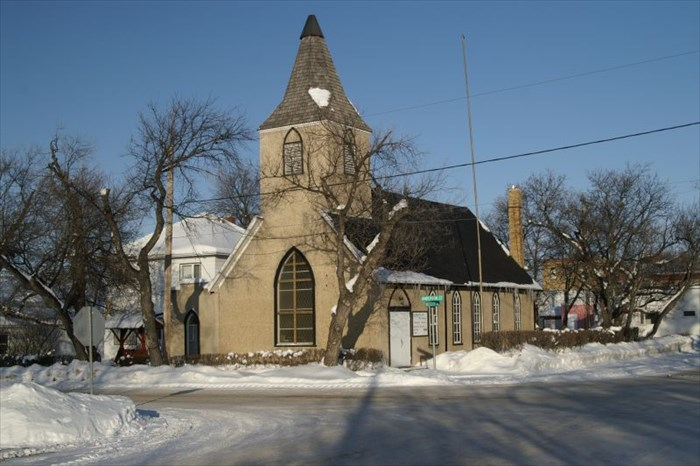
St. Michael's and All Angels Anglican

The Presbyterians, Methodists and Church of England all held services in the CPR depot beginning in 1883 and townspeople of all denominations attended regardless of affiliation. By 1884 the Presbyterians had built the town's first church and in 1885 the Anglicans the town's second, St Michael and All Angels’. The Methodists built their first church in 1890 and, soon outgrowing it, a second in 1906, the first building being destroyed by fire concurrently with the opening of the new church. The second Methodist church building remains that of the United Church of Canada congregation which came into existence as Grenfell United Church upon the unification of Canadian Presbyterians, Methodists and Congregationalists in 1925, the old Presbyterian church building being sold to the Independent Order of Odd Fellows as a lodge room. It is reported that "[i]n publications of the day, clergy recounted their experiences. There were the monotonous, if not exhausting, trips in the heat of summer or the cold of winter made by the Rector of Grenfell, Frank V. Baker, arriving disappointed to find '... only a handful of people gathered' for a service."

The Lutherans built their first Peace Lutheran Church in 1905 and a second, larger building in 1951, the old building being sold to the Ukrainian Orthodox congregation. The Roman Catholics, originally of substantially Irish stock, built St Columbkill Church in 1903 and, with an influx of Polish and Ruthenian families found their numbers considerably increased and by 1944 moved and extended the church building; in 1979 they opened a second, completely modern church building. Protestant Austrians organised the St John's Evangelical and Reformed congregation in 1888 and built two churches in succession in 1894 and 1903 before amalgamating with the United Church in 1964. The Baptists purchased the town's disused first schoolhouse in 1895 for use as their church; their congregation dwindled over time and in the mid-1960s the Apostolic Church purchased the building; they subsequently built a new church and the Masons acquired the old Baptist church for use as a lodge. The Grenfell Revival Centre opened in a disused Lutheran church building in 1960. The Ukrainian Catholics initially affiliated themselves with the Roman Catholics and worshipped jointly with them; in 1921 they were able to build their own church and in 1957 acquired the Lutherans’ old and now disused church building. In 1991 a re-constituted Presbyterian congregation was established in Grenfell as Trinity Presbyterian Church.

== Museums and other prominent points of interest ==
Grenfell's Adare Museum has "a wide collection of artifacts" and a "military display, historical map of the area and [a] 1949 Fargo fire truck." It was a "Queen Anne revival style home" built in 1904 by Mr. and Mrs. Edward Fitz-Gerald, he "the editor and publisher of the first local newspaper in Grenfell in 1894", the purchaser of which house divided it into suites and "bequeathed [it] to the Town for senior citizens housing." Ultimately "the Grenfell Museum Association became curator and opened it as a museum on July 6, 1973." A reputation for unusual community interest in culture was demonstrated in 1974 when the choir of the then-University of Saskatchewan, Regina Campus, chose to perform in Grenfell's Community Hall among its destinations on a provincial tour.

Grenfell Regional Park on the west side of Grenfell features picnic, playground area, showers, food services, and a nine-hole sand greens golf course.

== Military ==
Grenfell was home to one of the seven chapters of the Imperial Order Daughters of the Empire (IODE) established in 1909 after the Boer War, for women's aid to the war effort. The Royal North-West Mounted Police force detachment was established in Grenfell in 1915. Following World War II the militia was reorganised in 1961, the 10th Field Regiment consisted of several batteries including 65th Battery Grenfell.

== Sports and recreation ==
Before 1900, Grenfell, Battleford, Saltcoats and Moosomin all hosted soccer teams. In 1905 the Saskatchewan Soccer Association was first established in Grenfell. In the 19th century, Grenfell boasted one of the dozen or so "town bands" or "citizens’ bands" of the North-West Territories. The early English settlers had a flair for sporting activities, kept hounds and horses and also established a run similar to that of fox hunting runs in Britain in the 1800s. One of Canada's first polo clubs started in Grenfell. Currently, the town features an active snowmobiling club, the Grenfell Snowdrifters, and the Grenfell Spitfire Hockey club plays in the Qu'Appelle Valley Hockey League. The Flames are the recreational hockey club, and the Titans are the seniors ball club.

The Community Centre on Main Street has a substantial hall which has been used for presentation of university choir concerts with full audience indicating enthusiastic appreciation.

== Prominent Grenfell natives and residents ==
- James Dill, Member of Council of the North-West Territories 1891-98.
- William J. Patterson, provincial premier from 1935 to 1944 and Lieutenant-Governor from 1951 to 1958 was born in Grenfell.
- Sir Richard Stuart Lake started to homestead near Grenfell in 1883 along with his family. Lake served as a justice of the peace and vice-president of the Territorial Grain Growers' Association. He was elected to the North-West Territories Assembly before becoming Lieutenant Governor of Saskatchewan in 1915.
- Benjamin Parkyn Richardson, MLA 1888-1891, as also the first president of the Grenfell Agricultural Society which was established in 1884. "In the death of Benjamin Parkyn Richardson, the district of Grenfell has lost one of its early pioneers and the town one of its most prominent and active citizens. Coming to what was then Grenfell in the spring of 1884, he at once identified himself with the interests of the West, at that time still uncertain, its future success- doubtful. The difficulties and discouragement of those early years, is still fresh and green in the memories of some who are still with us, but who, like him whose loss we now deplore, have lived to see the full dawn of a brighter day, and a truer knowledge of the land we live in." was reported in the Grenfell Sun, 1910. He was also the director of the Hospital Board, chairman of the Public School Board, and editor of the Grenfell Sun, of which he was a founder.
- Dennis A. FitzGerald born January 1, 1903, in Grenfell and graduated Grenfell High School in 1919. FitzGerald became director of the United States Department of Agriculture's Office of Foreign Agricultural Relations, as chief of ECA's food division. Paul Hoffman, his superior in the division, said of him on his appointment, "He's probably the greatest authority on food procurement and distribution in the world."
- James Thomas Milton Anderson taught at Grenfell sometime between 1906 and 1911. He married Edith Redgewick in Grenfell before moving to Yorkton and Regina, becoming the fifth Premier of Saskatchewan.
- Dr. Calvin Bricker, a Grenfell dentist, competed in the Olympics. In the London 1908 Summer Olympics he gained a bronze medal in the men's long jump, and during the 1912 Summer Olympics held in Stockholm he won the silver medal, again for men's long jump. Bricker was inducted into the University of Toronto, Saskatchewan and Canadian Sports Hall of Fame. Canadian athletes who excel in jumping activities are awarded the Cal D. Bricker Memorial trophy.

== See also ==
- List of towns in Saskatchewan
