= Broadview, Saskatchewan =

Town in Saskatchewan, Canada

Broadview
- Town
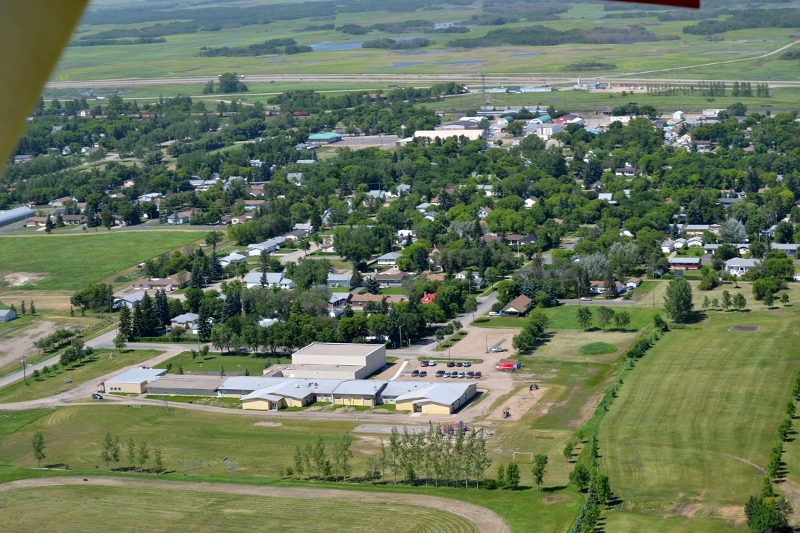
- Aerial view of Broadview in 2014

- Location of Broadview in Saskatchewan Broadview (Canada)
- Coordinates: 50.376°N 102.579°W
- Country: Canada
- Province: Saskatchewan
- Census division: No. 5
- Post office Founded: 1882-11-01
- Incorporated (Village): 1898

Government
  - Mayor: Colleen Umpherville
  - Member of legislative assembly: Don Toth
  - Member of Parliament: Ed Komarnicki

Area
  - Total: 2.45 km^{2} (0.95 sq mi)

Population (2006)
  - Total: 611
  - Density: 248.9/km^{2} (645/sq mi)
- Time zone: CST
- Postal code: S0G 0K0
- Area code: 306
- Highways: Highway 1 (TCH) / Highway 201 / Highway 605
- Railways: Canadian Pacific Railway

Broadview is a town in Saskatchewan along Highway 1, the Trans-Canada Highway, about 155 kilometres (96 mi) east of Regina. The local economy is based mainly on agriculture. It is also the administrative headquarters of the Rural Municipality of Elcapo No. 154

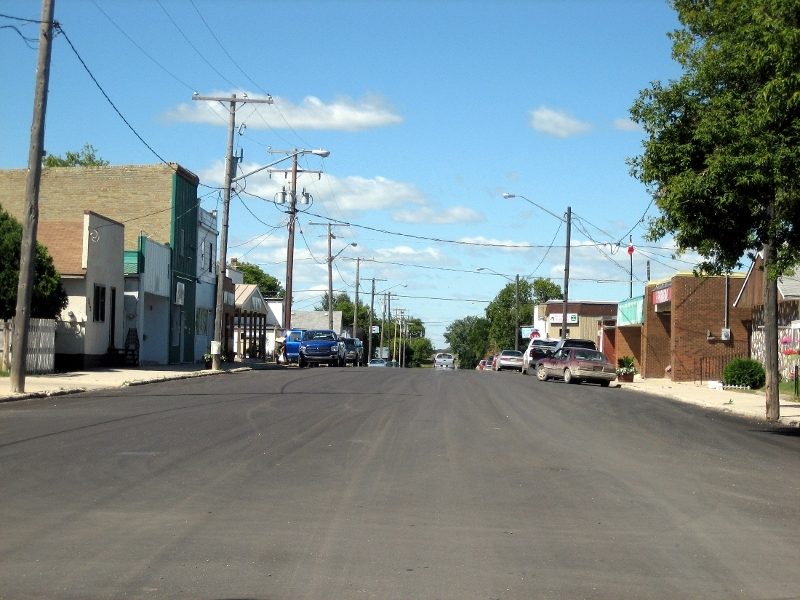
Broadview Main Street 2014

== History ==
The North-West Mounted Police (NWMP) set up a divisional post in Broadview in 1885. Sergeant Bill, a goat from Broadview, served as the mascot for the 5th Battalion (Western Cavalry), CEF, during World War I. The goat received a decoration, and after its passing resides now in the Broadview Museum. The Broadview railway station was designated a historic railway station in 1992.

== Geography ==
Broadview is located in the Indian Head Plain of the Aspen Parkland ecoregion. The physiographic region is the Qu'Appelle plains in the Saskatchewan Plains physiographic region. Broadview is within the topographical area of Weed Hills. The bedrock geology belongs to that of the Mannville Group, a stratigraphical unit of Cretaceous age in the Western Canadian Sedimentary Basin formed during the lower Cretaceous period. The area is characterised by lush rolling grasslands, interspersed with poplar bluffs and open sloughs. The Cowessess, Kahkewistahaw, Ochapowace Indian reserves are within 20 kilometres (12 mi) of Broadview. Highway 201 provides access to Bird's Point Recreation Site and Crooked Lake Provincial Park, which are located in the Qu'Appelle Valley.

=== Climate ===
Broadview has a humid continental climate, with extreme seasonal temperatures. It has hot summers and cold winters, with the average daily temperatures ranging from −14.2 °C (6.4 °F) in January to 18.1 °C (64.6 °F) in July. Annually, temperatures exceed 30 °C (86 °F) on an average in late July Typically, summer lasts from late June until late August, and the humidity is seldom uncomfortably high. Winter lasts from November to March, and varies greatly in length and severity. Spring and autumn are both short and highly variable.

On February 1, 1996, a record windchill of −60.7 °C (−77.3 °F) was recorded around 11:00 in the morning. Creating the windchill were north-westerly winds blowing at 44 kilometres per hour (27 mph) combined with a temperature of −39.3 °C (−38.7 °F).

The highest temperature ever recorded in Broadview was 41.1 °C (106 °F) on 21 June 1910 and 5 July 1937. The coldest temperature ever recorded was −46.7 °C (−52 °F) on 20 January 1943.

Climate data for Broadview, 1981–2010 normals, extremes 1904–present
Month	Jan	Feb	Mar	Apr	May	Jun	Jul	Aug	Sep	Oct	Nov	Dec	Year
Record high °C (°F)	10.6 (51.1)	12.5 (54.5)	20.6 (69.1)	31.5 (88.7)	37.4 (99.3)	41.1 (106.0)	41.1 (106.0)	38.0 (100.4)	36.1 (97.0)	32.2 (90.0)	22.2 (72.0)	13.9 (57.0)	41.1 (106.0)
Mean daily maximum °C (°F)	−8.7 (16.3)	−7.2 (19.0)	0.2 (32.4)	10.7 (51.3)	17.6 (63.7)	21.8 (71.2)	25.1 (77.2)	24.2 (75.6)	18.0 (64.4)	10.1 (50.2)	−0.6 (30.9)	−7.8 (18.0)	8.6 (47.5)
Daily mean °C (°F)	−14.2 (6.4)	−12.6 (9.3)	−5.1 (22.8)	4.1 (39.4)	10.7 (51.3)	15.4 (59.7)	18.1 (64.6)	16.9 (62.4)	11.0 (51.8)	4.0 (39.2)	−5.5 (22.1)	−13.0 (8.6)	2.5 (36.5)
Mean daily minimum °C (°F)	−19.6 (−3.3)	−17.9 (−0.2)	−10.2 (13.6)	−2.5 (27.5)	3.7 (38.7)	8.8 (47.8)	11.0 (51.8)	9.7 (49.5)	4.0 (39.2)	−2.1 (28.2)	−10.4 (13.3)	−18.2 (−0.8)	−3.7 (25.3)
Record low °C (°F)	−46.7 (−52.1)	−42.8 (−45.0)	−43.9 (−47.0)	−26.7 (−16.1)	−15.6 (3.9)	−6.7 (19.9)	−3.9 (25.0)	−4.8 (23.4)	−9.4 (15.1)	−23.0 (−9.4)	−35.2 (−31.4)	−41.7 (−43.1)	−46.7 (−52.1)
Average precipitation mm (inches)	14.6 (0.57)	9.2 (0.36)	21.5 (0.85)	23.1 (0.91)	55.9 (2.20)	76.9 (3.03)	57.3 (2.26)	62.5 (2.46)	41.5 (1.63)	22.0 (0.87)	19.8 (0.78)	20.5 (0.81)	424.7 (16.72)
Average rainfall mm (inches)	0.2 (0.01)	0.7 (0.03)	5.2 (0.20)	16.5 (0.65)	49.8 (1.96)	76.8 (3.02)	57.3 (2.26)	62.5 (2.46)	39.1 (1.54)	13.9 (0.55)	4.0 (0.16)	0.4 (0.02)	326.3 (12.85)
Average snowfall cm (inches)	17.1 (6.7)	10.4 (4.1)	18.0 (7.1)	7.1 (2.8)	6.3 (2.5)	0.1 (0.0)	0.0 (0.0)	0.0 (0.0)	2.6 (1.0)	8.8 (3.5)	17.3 (6.8)	24.2 (9.5)	111.8 (44.0)
Mean monthly sunshine hours	116.4	140.4	174.9	233.5	268	287.3	326.5	283.3	196	167.9	106.4	95.2	2,395.8
Percentage possible sunshine	43.9	49.6	47.6	56.5	56.0	58.6	66.0	63.0	51.6	50.3	39.2	37.9	51.7
Source: Environment Canada

== Demographics ==
In the 2021 Census of Population conducted by Statistics Canada, Broadview had a population of 541 living in 256 of its 298 total private dwellings, a change of −2% from its 2016 population of 552. With a land area of 2.82 km^{2} (1.09 sq mi), it had a population density of 191.8/km^{2} (496.9/sq mi) in 2021.

== Government ==
The town of Broadview has a mayor as the highest ranking government official. The town also elects aldermen or councillors to form the municipal council. Previously the mayor was Sidney Criddle, but not anymore. The current councillors are Lori Stephan, Esther Bonk, Brent Bagshaw, Terry Fitzgerald, Tracy Strachan. The town administrator is Mervin Schmidt.

Provincially, Broadview is within the constituency of Moosomin served by their Member of legislative assembly, Steven Bonk.

Federally the Souris—Moose Mountain riding is represented by their Member of Parliament, Robert Kitchen.

== Economy ==
The Mainline Regional Economic Development Authority provides assistance and business advice for Broadview and the Rural Municipality of Elcapo No. 154. Highway 201 provides access to the Qu'Appelle Valley, 19 kilometres (12 mi) north, which contains Crooked Lake Provincial Park at Crooked Lake and Bird's Point Recreation Site at Round Lake.

== Infrastructure ==
=== Transportation ===
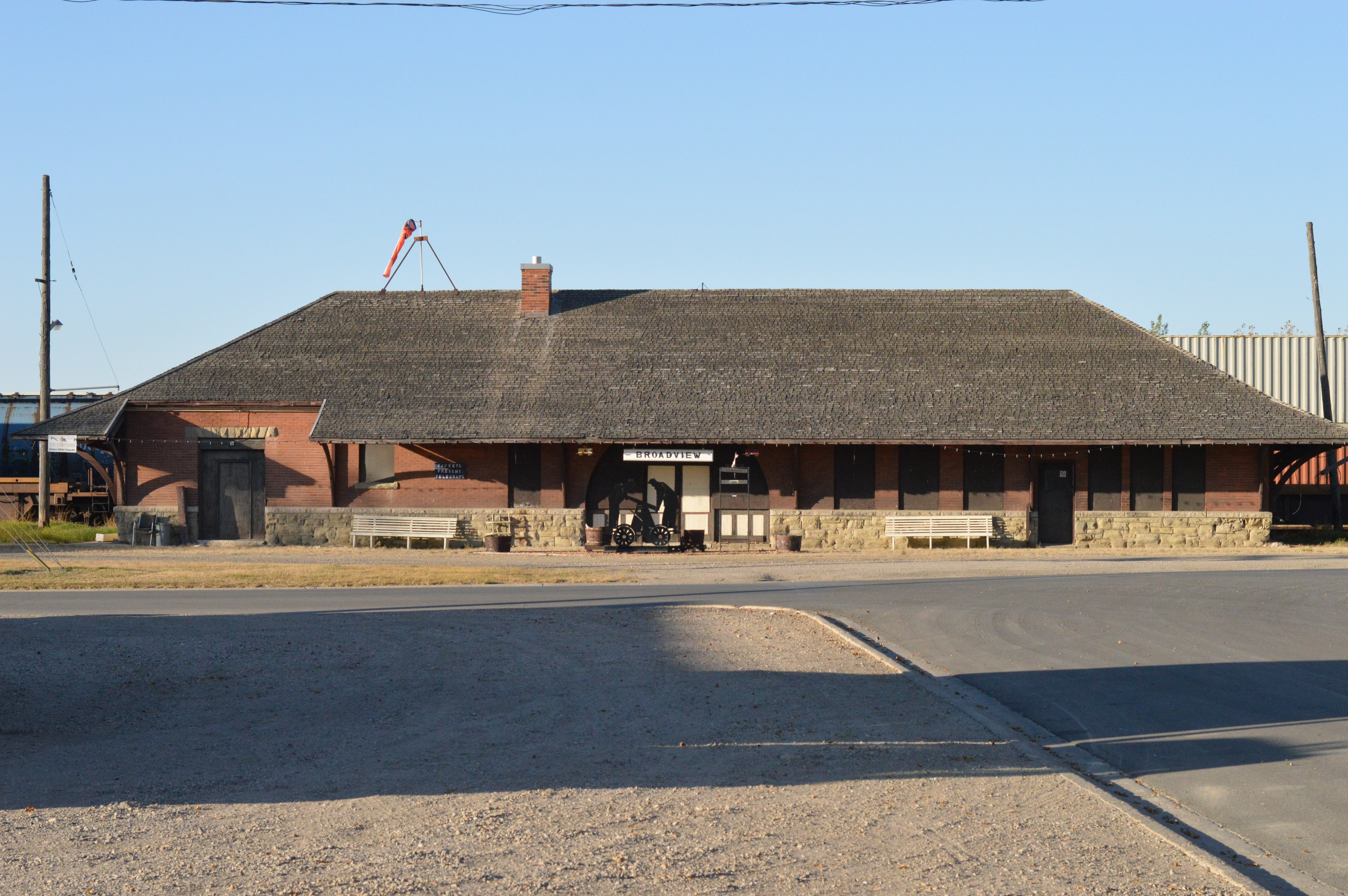
CPR railway station facing north

Broadview is located on the Highway 1, the Trans-Canada Highway, 155 kilometres (96 mi) east of the provincial capital city of Regina at the junction with Highway 201 north and Highway 605 south.

Broadview was the western terminus of the Canadian Pacific Railway in 1882, and later went on to become a major divisional point for the CPR. Broadview was located on the CPR West line between Regina (Indian Head subdivision) and Winnipeg, Manitoba (Broadview subdivision). The line ran through Wolseley, Summerberry, Grenfell, Oakshela, Broadview, it continued east through Percival, Whitewood and Burrows. At Broadview in 1925, the time zone changed from Central Standard Time to Mountain Standard Time. The Canadian Pacific Railway station building was declared a historic railway station in 1992.

The original grade which the 1882 rail was built upon was abandoned in favour of a better grade, and an historical marker commemorates the old rail track.

=== Department of Transportation aerodrome ===
The Broadview aerodrome was located approximately three miles south of the town. In approximately 1942 the aerodrome was listed at 50°16′N 102°32′W with a Var. 16 degrees E and elevation of 2030'. The aerodrome was listed as a Turf, all way field with three runways were listed as follows:

Runway Name	Length	Width	Surface
16/34	3600'	600'	Turf
7/25	3300'	600'	Turf
13/31	3500'	600'	Turf

== Education ==
Currently Broadview school serves an enrolled population of about 150 students between Kindergarten to Grade 12 is a part of Prairie Valley School Division No. 208. Broadview school division office is located in Broadview.

Broadview School #5 was established 1885, followed by Meadow Lea #55, Forest Farm #90, Spring Lake #153, Spring Lake #153, Clifton #278, Highland #437, River Ayr 534, Northwood #2988, Elcapo #3013, Kingsley #3916, Weed Creek #4352, Logwood #4924. Historically Cowesses Day School was situated near Broadview. The Highland One Room Schoolhouse is preserved in the Broadview museum.

== Parks and recreation ==
Broadview Recreation Site 50.3773°N 102.5315°W is 3 kilometres (1.9 mi) east of town along Highway 1 at the intersection with Highway 201. It is a rest area with a picnic area and washrooms.

Celebration Park comes equipped with baseball diamonds, tennis courts, rodeo ground, horseshoe pits, and a children's playground. Broadview also features a natural ice-skating and hockey rink, Broadview Curling Club, and the nine-hole Broadview Golf Club.

=== Museum ===
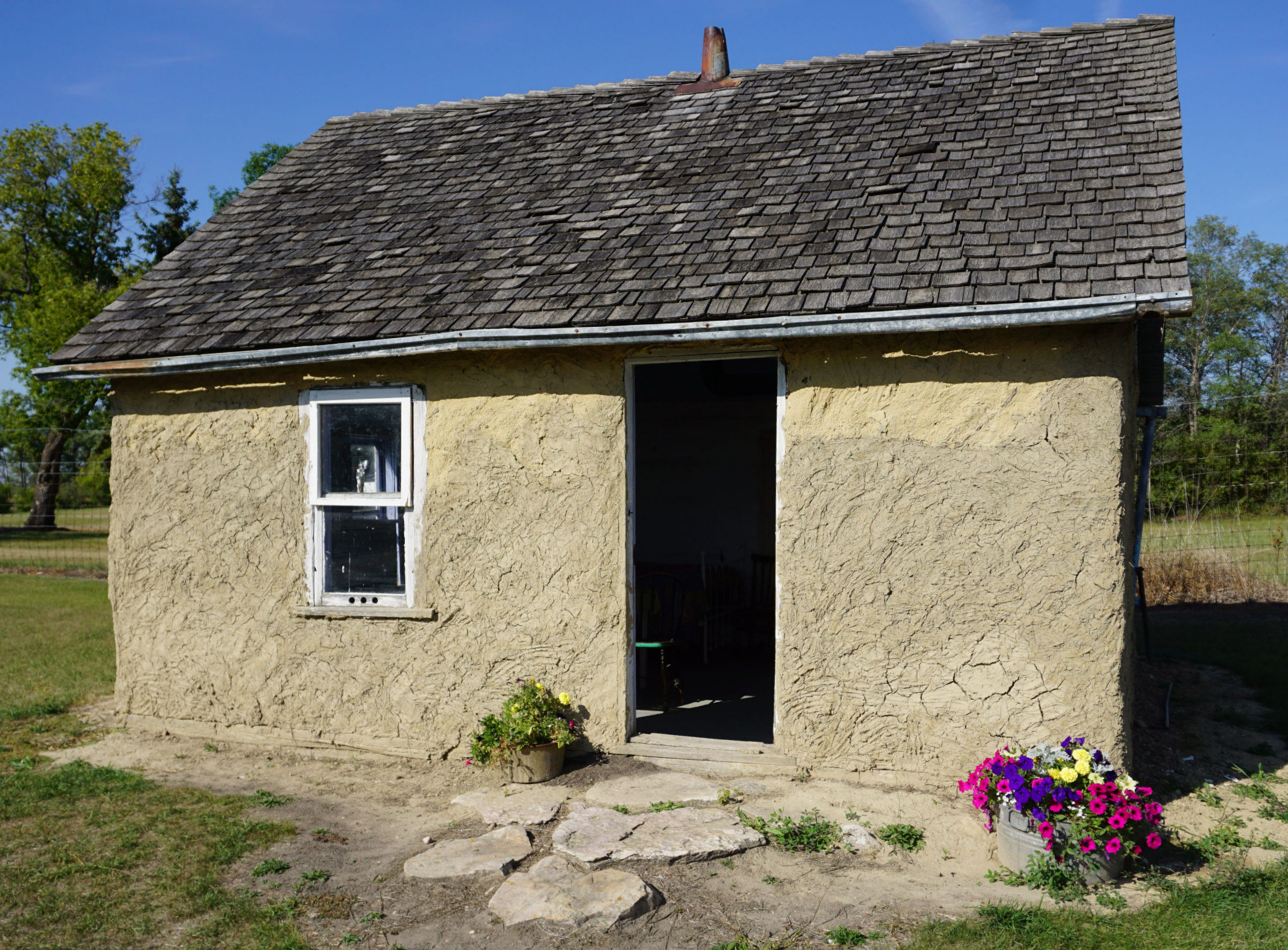
Delorme cabin

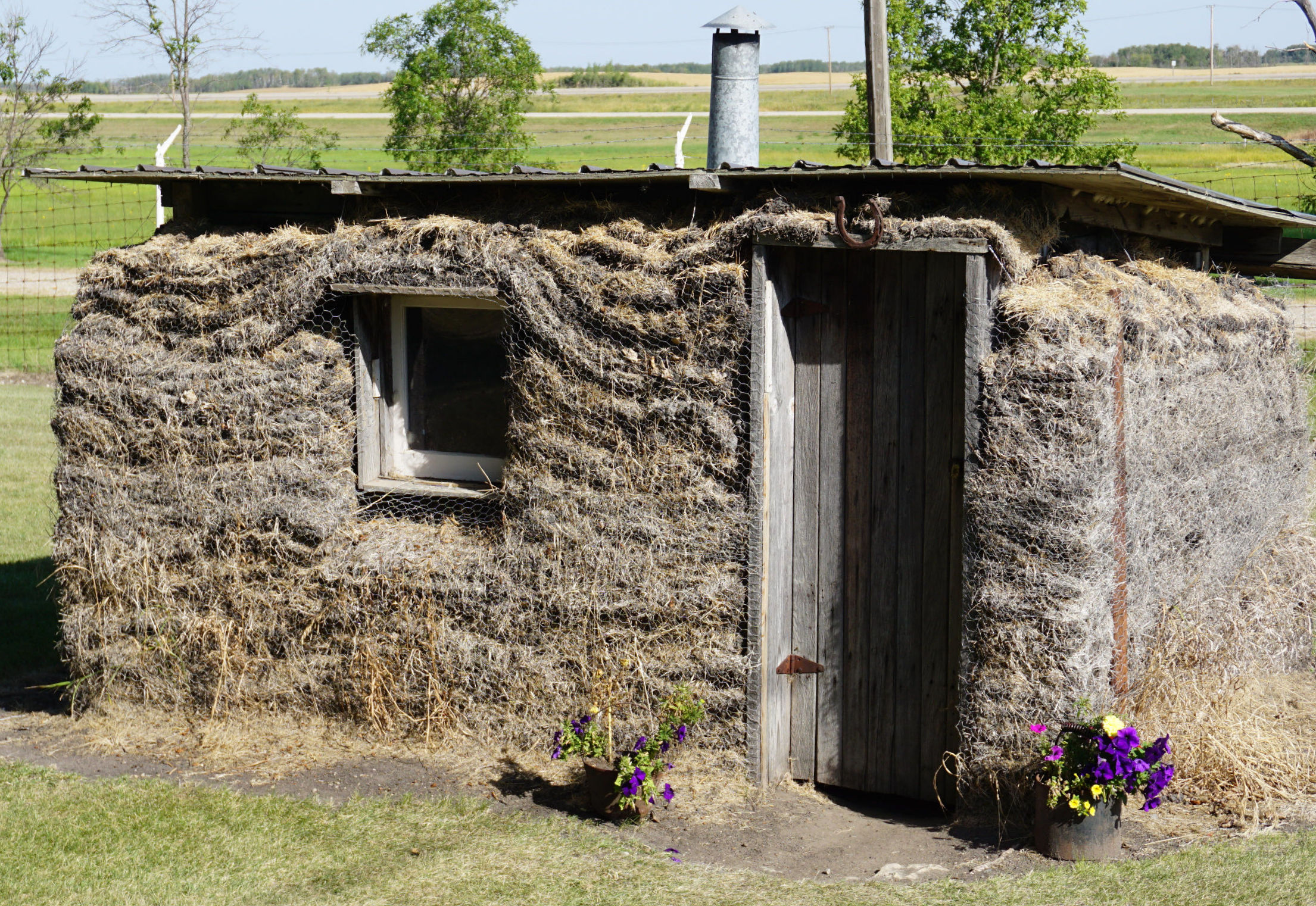
Sod house

The Broadview Historical Museum, which opened on July 15, 1972, features the Highland One Room Schoolhouse a reconstructed sod house, the Delorme family's one-room log cabin, extensive indoor and outdoor installations of numerous Cree and settler archives, artifacts, and war memorabilia, including Sergeant Bill, "Saskatchewan's most famous goat". Archival photos and documents include agricultural, military, settler, and Cree history and heritage including genealogical resources.

== Notable people ==
- John Hall Archer, librarian, historian, and civil servant, and the first President of the University of Regina
- Norman Inkster, former president of Interpol

== See also ==
- List of communities in Saskatchewan
- List of towns in Saskatchewan
