= Melville Beach =

Village in Saskatchewan, Canada

- Resort village
- Resort Village of Melville Beach
- Location within Saskatchewan
- Coordinates: 50.615°N 102.725°W
- Country: Canada
- Province: Saskatchewan
- Census division: 5
- Rural municipality: Grayson No. 184
- Incorporated: July 1, 1983

Government
  - Mayor: Ken Gerhardt
  - Governing body: Resort Village Council
  - Administrator: Kayla Hauser

Area (2016)
  - Land: 0.21 km^{2} (0.081 sq mi)

Population (2016)
  - Total: 19
  - Density: 90.5/km^{2} (234/sq mi)
- Time zone: CST
  - Summer (DST): CST
- Postal code: S0A 1X0
- Area codes: 306 and 639
- Highway(s): Hwy 247
- Waterway(s): Crooked Lake
- Website: Official website

Melville Beach (2016 population: 19) is a resort village in the Canadian province of Saskatchewan within Census Division No. 5. It is on the shores of Crooked Lake in the Rural Municipality of Grayson No. 184.

== History ==
Melville Beach incorporated as a resort village on July 1, 1983.

== Demographics ==
Population history (1981–2016)
| Year | Pop. | ±% |
|---|---|---|
| 1981 | | — |
| 1986 | 0 | — |
| 1991 | 10 | — |
| 1996 | 4 | −60.0% |
| 2001 | 16 | +300.0% |
| 2006 | 41 | +156.2% |
| 2011 | 27 | −34.1% |
| 2016 | 19 | −29.6% |
Source: Statistics Canada via Saskatchewan Bureau of Statistics

In the 2021 Census of Population conducted by Statistics Canada, Melville Beach had a population of 54 living in 29 of its 85 total private dwellings, a change of 184.2% from its 2016 population of 19. With a land area of 0.11 km^{2} (0.042 sq mi), it had a population density of 490.9/km^{2} (1,271.4/sq mi) in 2021.

In the 2016 Census of Population conducted by Statistics Canada, the Resort Village of Melville Beach recorded a population of 19 living in 9 of its 60 total private dwellings, a −29.6% change from its 2011 population of 27. With a land area of 0.21 km^{2} (0.081 sq mi), it had a population density of 90.5/km^{2} (234.3/sq mi) in 2016.

== Government ==
The Resort Village of Melville Beach is governed by an elected municipal council and an appointed administrator. The mayor is Ken Gerhardt and its administrator is Kayla Hauser.

== See also ==
- List of communities in Saskatchewan
- List of municipalities in Saskatchewan
- List of resort villages in Saskatchewan
- List of villages in Saskatchewan
- List of summer villages in Alberta
