= Zeneta =

Unincorporated community in Saskatchewan, Canada

- Hamlet
- Interactive map of Zeneta
- Coordinates: 50°43′51″N 102°03′54″W
- Country: Canada
- Province: Saskatchewan
- Rural Municipality: Fertile Belt No. 183
- Census division: Division No. 5
- Time zone: UTC−6 (Central Standard Time)
- Area code(s): 306, 639

Zeneta is an unincorporated community in the Rural Municipality of Fertile Belt No. 183, Saskatchewan, Canada. It is located on the Rivers subdivision of the Canadian National Railway between Yarbo and Atwater. Road access is via a short access road off of Highway 637 just north of Esterhazy.

== See also ==
- List of communities in Saskatchewan
