= Bird's Point =

Bird's Point may refer to:

- Bird's Point, Missouri, United States
- Bird's Point, Saskatchewan, Canada
