= Kā-kīwistāhāw =

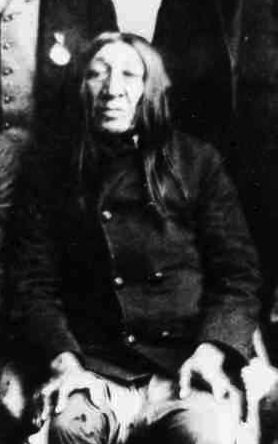
Kā-kīwistāhāw, photographed in 1886 in Brantford

Kā-kīwistāhāw (or Kahkewistahaw, meaning "He Who Flies Around"; c. 1810 – 1906) was a Canadian Plains Cree chief.

Kā-kīwistāhāw's father, Le Sonnant (Mähsette Kuiuab), was a leader of the Rabbit Skin people (Wāpošwayānak). Le Sonnant, a medicine man and warrior, was one of the signatories of the 1817 Selkirk Treaty.

Kā-kīwistāhāw himself signed Treaty 4, which established reserves for each signatory tribe. In 1881, the tribe's reserve was surveyed. It was situated on the south side of the Qu’Appelle Valley, between Round Lake and Crooked Lake. Once the reserve was established, many, including Kā-kīwistāhāw, gave up their traditional buffalo hunting and adopted farming and raising cattle. The reserve's land proved fertile, and the proximity of the Canadian Pacific Railway to the south further increased its value. Periodically, the chief came under pressure to sell or surrender part of his territory to white settlers, but Kā-kīwistāhāw steadfastly refused.

Like most other Plains Cree leaders, Kā-kīwistāhāw did not participate in the 1885 North-West Rebellion. Kā-kīwistāhāw told him Indian Agent, "We will remain on our reserves and attend to our work," and even offered to protect the agent's family should the rebellion endanger them. In 1886, Kā-kīwistāhāw and other "loyal" chiefs were chosen to travel to Brantford, Ontario, for the unveiling of a memorial to Joseph Brant (Thayendanegea).

In 1906, Kā-kīwistāhāw died on his reserve. Only a year after his death, the tribe gave up 70% of their land.
