= Espeseth Cove =

Hamlet in Saskatchewan, Canada

Coordinates: 50.330°N 102.240°W

Location of Espeseth Cove in Saskatchewan

Espeseth Cove is a hamlet in the Canadian province of Saskatchewan. It is on the northern shore of Round Lake with access from Highway 247.

== See also ==
- List of communities in Saskatchewan
