= West End, Saskatchewan =

Village in Saskatchewan, Canada

West End
- Resort village
- Resort Village of West End
- Location within Saskatchewan
- Coordinates: 50.549°N 102.414°W
- Country: Canada
- Province: Saskatchewan
- Census division: 5
- Rural municipality: RM of Fertile Belt No. 183
- Incorporated: June 15, 1983

Government
  - Mayor: Darcey Niemi
  - Governing body: Resort Village Council
  - Administrator: Lorrayne Smith

Area (2016)
  - Land: 0.34 km^{2} (0.13 sq mi)

Population (2016)
  - Total: 37
  - Density: 108.8/km^{2} (282/sq mi)
- Time zone: CST
  - Summer (DST): CST
- Area codes: 306 and 639
- Highway(s): 247
- Waterway(s): Round Lake

West End (2016 population: 37) is a resort village in the Canadian province of Saskatchewan within Census Division No. 5. It is at the west end of Round Lake in the Rural Municipality of Fertile Belt No. 183.

== History ==
West End incorporated as a resort village on June 15, 1983.

== Demographics ==
Population history (1981–2016)
| Year | Pop. | ±% |
|---|---|---|
| 1981 | | — |
| 1986 | 11 | — |
| 1991 | 13 | +18.2% |
| 1996 | 16 | +23.1% |
| 2001 | 10 | −37.5% |
| 2006 | 26 | +160.0% |
| 2011 | 17 | −34.6% |
| 2016 | 37 | +117.6% |
Source: Statistics Canada via Saskatchewan Bureau of Statistics

In the 2021 Census of Population conducted by Statistics Canada, West End had a population of 41 living in 19 of its 51 total private dwellings, a change of 10.8% from its 2016 population of 37. With a land area of 0.37 km^{2} (0.14 sq mi), it had a population density of 110.8/km^{2} (287.0/sq mi) in 2021.

In the 2016 Census of Population conducted by Statistics Canada, the Resort Village of West End recorded a population of 37 living in 15 of its 74 total private dwellings, a 117.6% change from its 2011 population of 17. With a land area of 0.34 km^{2} (0.13 sq mi), it had a population density of 108.8/km^{2} (281.9/sq mi) in 2016.

== Government ==
The Resort Village of West End is governed by an elected municipal council and an appointed administrator. The mayor is Darcey Niemi and its administrator is Lorrayne Smith.

== See also ==
- List of communities in Saskatchewan
- List of municipalities in Saskatchewan
- List of resort villages in Saskatchewan
- List of villages in Saskatchewan
- List of summer villages in Alberta
