= Percival, Saskatchewan =

Human settlement in Canada

Coordinates: 50°21′48″N 102°24′49″W

Percival was a hamlet in the Canadian province of Saskatchewan on the Trans-Canada Highway east of Broadview and west of Whitewood. Listed as a designated place by Statistics Canada, the hamlet had a reported population of two in the Canada 2006 Census, down from 15 in 2001.
