= Kahkewistahaw First Nation =

Canadian First Nations band

- Band No. 362
- People: Saulteaux; Cree
- Treaty: Treaty 4
- Headquarters: Broadview
- Province: Saskatchewan

Land
- Main reserve: Kahkewistahaw 72
- Reserve: Kahkewistahaw 72A-72W
- Land area: 112.409 km^{2} (43.401 sq mi)

Population (2019)
- On reserve: 607
- Off reserve: 1498
- Total population: 2105

Government
- Chief: Evan Taypotat

Tribal Council
- Yorkton Tribal Administration

Website
- kfn72.com

Kahkewistahaw First Nation (Cree: ᑳᐦ ᑮᐑᐢᑕᐦᐋᐤ kâh-kîwîstahâw) is a Saulteaux- and Cree-speaking First Nation in southern Saskatchewan, Canada. The name Kahkewistahaw means "Eagle flying in the air". The reserve was established due to Chief Kahkewistahaw signing Treaty 4 on September 15, 1874. Their reserves include:

- Kahkewistahaw 72
- Kahkewistahaw 72A-1
- Kahkewistahaw 72B
- Kahkewistahaw 72C
- Kahkewistahaw 72D
- Kahkewistahaw 72E
- Kahkewistahaw 72F
- Kahkewistahaw 72G
- Kahkewistahaw 72H
- Kahkewistahaw 72I
- Kahkewistahaw 72J
- Kahkewistahaw 72K
- Kahkewistahaw 72L
- Kahkewistahaw 72M
- Kahkewistahaw 72N
- Treaty Four Reserve Grounds 77, shared with 32 other bands.
