= Bangor, Saskatchewan =

Village in Saskatchewan, Canada

Bangor
- Village
- Village of Bangor
- Location of Bangor in Saskatchewan Bangor (Canada)
- Coordinates: 50.482°N 102.203°W
- Country: Canada
- Province: Saskatchewan
- Region: Southeast
- Census division: 5
- Rural municipality: Fertile Belt No. 183

Government
  - Mayor: Governing body
  - Bangor Village Council: Administrator

Population (2001)
  - Total: 50
- Time zone: CST
- Postal code: S0A 0E0
- Area code: 306

Bangor (2016 population: 38) is a village in the Canadian province of Saskatchewan within the Rural Municipality of Fertile Belt No. 183 and Census Division No. 5.

== History ==
Bangor was settled in 1902 by descendants of Welsh families who had migrated to Patagonia in 1860. Conflicts with the Argentine authorities and a flood in 1899 led some 250 to migrate again. At the urging of David Lloyd George and Evan Jenkins, one of their fellow Welsh Patagonians who had migrated to Canada earlier, they moved to Saskatchewan.

Bangor incorporated as a village on June 8, 1911. The Grand Trunk Pacific Railway was going to name the community Basco, but the Welsh settlers convinced them to change it to be named after the community of Bangor in Wales.

== Demographics ==
Population history (1981–2016)
| Year | Pop. | ±% |
|---|---|---|
| 1981 | 68 | — |
| 1986 | 73 | +7.4% |
| 1991 | 54 | −26.0% |
| 1996 | 57 | +5.6% |
| 2001 | 48 | −15.8% |
| 2006 | 50 | +4.2% |
| 2011 | 46 | −8.0% |
| 2016 | 38 | −17.4% |
Source: Statistics Canada via Saskatchewan Bureau of Statistics

In the 2021 Census of Population conducted by Statistics Canada, Bangor had a population of 40 living in 11 of its 12 total private dwellings, a change of 5.3% from its 2016 population of 38. With a land area of 1.57 km^{2} (0.61 sq mi), it had a population density of 25.5/km^{2} (66.0/sq mi) in 2021.

In the 2016 Census of Population, the Village of Bangor recorded a population of 38 living in 10 of its 14 total private dwellings, a −21.1% change from its 2011 population of 46. With a land area of 1.65 km^{2} (0.64 sq mi), it had a population density of 23.0/km^{2} (59.6/sq mi) in 2016.

== See also ==
- List of communities in Saskatchewan
- List of villages in Saskatchewan
