= Broadview station (Saskatchewan) =

Railway station in Saskatchewan, Canada

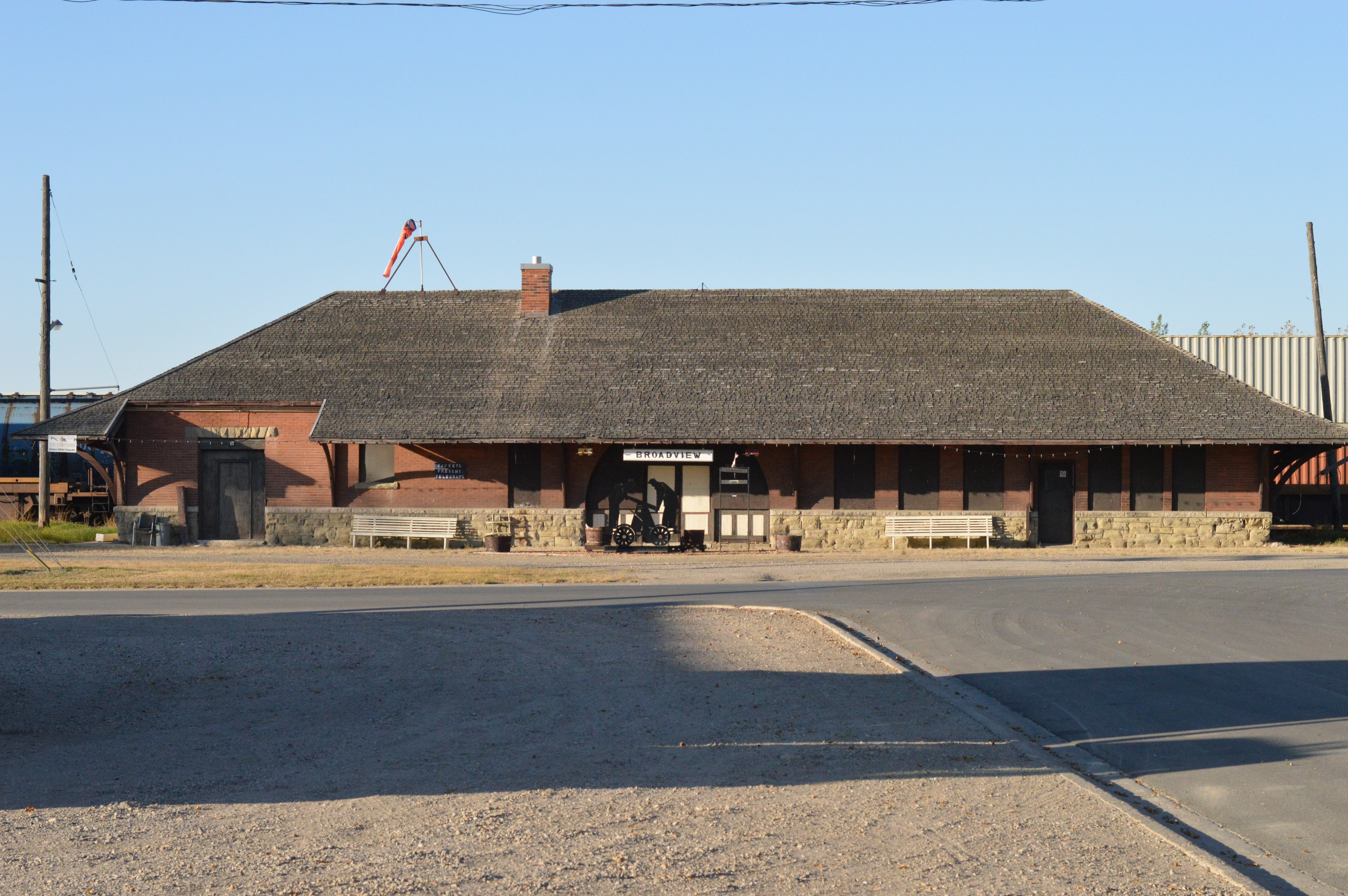
- CPR railway station in Broadview (facing north)

General information
- Location: Front St. (at 6th Ave. (Hwy 605)); Broadview, Saskatchewan
- Coordinates: 50.3794°N 102.5794°W
- Line: Canadian Pacific Railway

History
- Opened: 1913

Former services
Preceding station	Canadian Pacific Railway	Following station
Oakshela toward Vancouver	Main Line	Percival toward Montreal Windsor
Location

Broadview station is a former railway station in Broadview, Saskatchewan, Canada. The building was constructed by Canadian Pacific Railway in 1913. The one story, brick railway station is of a Romanesque Revival style. It was built along the CP transcontinental mainline; the station also served as a division point on the railway. The building was designated a historic railway station in 1992.

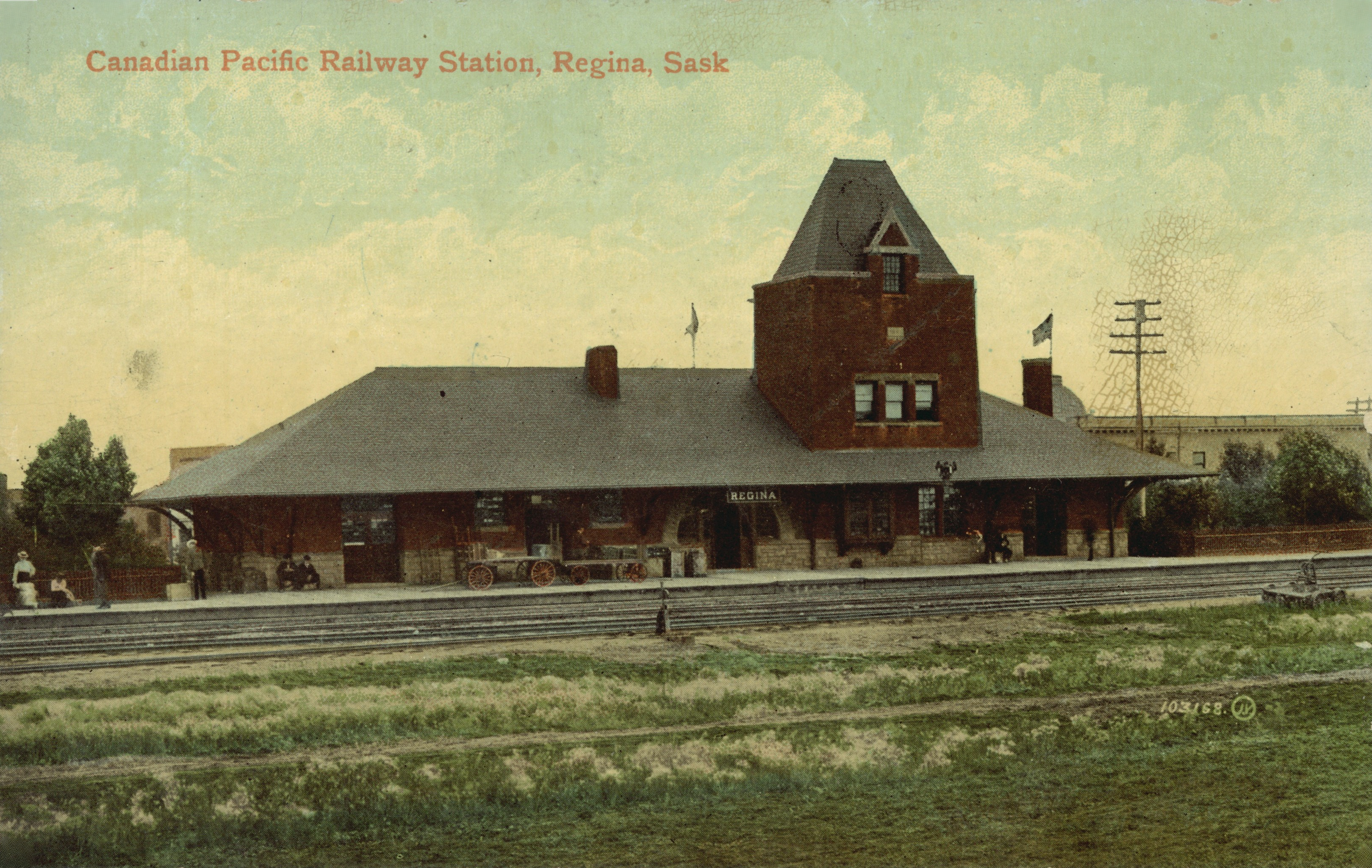
Photograph of the station in Regina before it was dismantled and moved to Broadview. The original tower was removed during the move.

The station building was constructed in 1898 and was originally located in Regina. In 1911, it was dismantled and moved to Broadview to make way for the new Regina Union Station. When it was rebuilt in Broadview, the original tower was destroyed.

== See also ==
- List of designated heritage railway stations of Canada
