= Greenspot =

Hamlet in Saskatchewan, Canada

Coordinates: 50.6072°N 102.6747°W

Location of Greenspot in Saskatchewan

Greenspot is a hamlet in Saskatchewan, Canada. It is in the Rural Municipality of Grayson No. 184 on the shores of Crooked Lake in the Qu'Appelle Valley.

== See also ==
- List of communities in Saskatchewan
