= Exner's Twin Bays =

Community in Saskatchewan, Canada

Exner's Twin Bays Exner Twin Bays
- Organized hamlet
- Location of Exner's Twin Bays in Saskatchewan Exner's Twin Bays (Canada)
- Coordinates: 50.616°N 102.701°W
- Country: Canada
- Province: Saskatchewan
- Census division: 5
- Rural municipality (RM): Grayson No. 184

Government
  - Governing body: RM of Grayson No. 184
  - Hamlet board chair: Darren Ulmer
- Time zone: CST
- Area code: 306
- Highways: Highway 247
- Waterways: Crooked Lake
- Website: www.rmofgrayson184.ca/exner-twin-bays.html

Exner's Twin Bays or Exner Twin Bays is an organized hamlet within the Rural Municipality (RM) of Grayson No. 184 in the Canadian province of Saskatchewan. It is along Highway 247 on the north shore of Crooked Lake, approximately 136 kilometres (85 mi) east of the city of Regina.

== Government ==
While Exner's Twin Bays is under the jurisdiction of the RM of Grayson, it has a three-person hamlet board that is chaired by Darren Ulmer, whose four-year term will expire in 2023.
