= Grenfell Beach =

Community in Saskatchewan, Canada

Coordinates: 50°36′00″N 102°46′02″W

Location of Grenfell Beach in Saskatchewan

Grenfell Beach is a hamlet on Crooked Lake in Saskatchewan. It is part of the Shesheep 74A First Nations Indian reserve, which is located adjacent to the Rural Municipality of Grayson No. 184.

== See also ==
- List of communities in Saskatchewan
