= CFZY-FM =

Former radio station in Saskatchewan, Canada

Defunct
- Stockholm, Saskatchewan; Canada
- Frequency: 104.1 MHz (FM)

Programming
- Format: community

Ownership
- Owner: Jody Herperger

History
- First air date: 1997
- Last air date: 2007

Technical information
- Transmitter coordinates: 50°39′25″N 102°18′14″W

CFZY-FM was a community radio station which operated at 104.1 MHz in Stockholm, Saskatchewan, Canada.

== History ==
Local resident Jody Herperger received approval to operate CFZY-FM from the CRTC on July 10, 1997, primarily to bring the programming of CHOZ-FM St. John's, Newfoundland and Labrador to Stockholm, Saskatchewan as a rebroadcaster.

In 2002, CFZY-FM renewed its licence until August 31, 2009; however, the station ceased broadcasting in 2007 following several years of competition from commercial like-formatted station CFGW-FM in Yorkton.

== See also ==
- CHOZ-FM
