= Kahkewistahaw 72 =

Indian reserve in Saskatchewan, Canada

Coordinates: 50°31′06″N 102°33′34″W

- Indian reserve
- Kahkewistahaw Indian Reserve No. 72
- Location in Saskatchewan
- First Nation: Kahkewistahaw
- Country: Canada
- Province: Saskatchewan

Area
  - Total: 5,911.5 ha (14,608 acres)

Population (2016)
  - Total: 502
  - Density: 8.49/km^{2} (22.0/sq mi)
- Community Well-Being Index: 58

Kahkewistahaw 72 is an Indian reserve of the Kahkewistahaw First Nation in Saskatchewan. It is about 13 kilometres (8.1 mi) north of Broadview. In the 2016 Canadian Census, it recorded a population of 502 living in 146 of its 184 total private dwellings. In the same year, its Community Well-Being index was calculated at 58 of 100, compared to 58.4 for the average First Nations community and 77.5 for the average non-Indigenous community.

== See also ==
- List of Indian reserves in Saskatchewan
