= Pelican Shores =

Hamlet in Saskatchewan, Canada

Coordinates: 50.55337259638019°N 102.39584316754853°W

Pelican Shores is an organized hamlet in the Rural Municipality of Fertile Belt No. 183 in the Canadian province of Saskatchewan. It is situated on the northern shore of Round Lake and access is from Highway 247.

== Demographics ==
In the 2021 Census of Population conducted by Statistics Canada, Pelican Shores had a population of 10 living in 7 of its 15 total private dwellings, a change of 100% from its 2016 population of 5. With a land area of 0.08 km^{2} (0.031 sq mi), it had a population density of 125.0/km^{2} (323.7/sq mi) in 2021.

== See also ==
- List of communities in Saskatchewan
- List of hamlets in Saskatchewan
