= Bird's Point, Saskatchewan =

Resort village in Saskatchewan, Canada

Bird's Point
- Resort village
- Resort Village of Bird's Point
- Location within Saskatchewan
- Coordinates: 50.544°N 102.35°W
- Country: Canada
- Province: Saskatchewan
- Census division: 5
- Rural municipality: RM of Fertile Belt No. 183
- Incorporated: September 1, 1981

Government
  - Mayor: Alice Davis
  - Governing body: Resort Village Council
  - Administrator: Alita Stevenson

Area (2016)
  - Land: 0.58 km^{2} (0.22 sq mi)

Population (2016)
  - Total: 112
  - Density: 189.8/km^{2} (492/sq mi)
- Time zone: CST
  - Summer (DST): CST
- Area codes: 306 and 639
- Highway(s): 247
- Waterway(s): Round Lake

Bird's Point (2016 population: 112) is a resort village in the Canadian province of Saskatchewan within Census Division No. 5 and the Rural Municipality of Fertile Belt No. 183. The community is on the northern shore of Round Lake in the eastern part of the Qu'Appelle Valley.

== History ==
Bird's Point incorporated as a resort village on September 1, 1981.

== Demographics ==
Population history (1981–2016)
Year	Pop.	±%
1981		—
1986	25	—
1991	46	+84.0%
1996	45	−2.2%
2001	66	+46.7%
2006	88	+33.3%
2011	103	+17.0%
2016	112	+8.7%
Source: Statistics Canada via Saskatchewan Bureau of Statistics

In the 2021 Census of Population conducted by Statistics Canada, Bird's Point had a population of 150 living in 66 of its 149 total private dwellings, a change of 33.9% from its 2016 population of 112. With a land area of 0.59 km^{2} (0.23 sq mi), it had a population density of 254.2/km^{2} (658.5/sq mi) in 2021.

In the 2016 Census of Population conducted by Statistics Canada, the Resort Village of Bird's Point recorded a population of 112 living in 55 of its 131 total private dwellings, a 8.7% change from its 2011 population of 103. With a land area of 0.59 km^{2} (0.23 sq mi), it had a population density of 189.8/km^{2} (491.7/sq mi) in 2016.

== Government ==
The Resort Village of Bird's Point is governed by an elected municipal council and an appointed administrator that meets on the second Monday of every month. The mayor is Alice Davis and its administrator is Alita Stevenson.

== Bird's Point Recreation Site ==
Bird's Point Recreation Site (50.5462°N 102.3702°W) is a provincial campround at Bird's Point on the shore of Round Lake. The campground has amenities such as a boat launch, sandy beach, picnic area, showers and washrooms, a gazebo, and a fish cleaning station.

== See also ==
- List of communities in Saskatchewan
- List of francophone communities in Saskatchewan
- List of municipalities in Saskatchewan
- List of resort villages in Saskatchewan
- List of villages in Saskatchewan
- List of summer villages in Alberta
