= Moose Bay, Saskatchewan =

Community in Saskatchewan, Canada

Coordinates: 50°36′43″N 102°40′52″W

Moose Bay is a hamlet on the northern shore of Crooked Lake in the Canadian province of Saskatchewan. Access is from Highway 247.

== Demographics ==
In the 2021 Census of Population conducted by Statistics Canada, Moose Bay had a population of 71 living in 32 of its 64 total private dwellings, a change of 73.2% from its 2016 population of 41. With a land area of 0.23 km^{2} (0.089 sq mi), it had a population density of 308.7/km^{2} (799.5/sq mi) in 2021.
