= Atwater, Saskatchewan =

Village in Saskatchewan, Canada

Atwater
- Village
- Village of Atwater
- Location of Atwater in Saskatchewan Atwater (Canada)
- Coordinates: 50.4631°N 102.1338°W
- Country: Canada
- Province: Saskatchewan
- Region: Southeast
- Census division: 5
- Rural Municipality: Fertile Belt No. 183

Government
  - Type: Municipal
  - Governing Body: Atwater Village Council
  - Mayor: James Ferguson
  - Administrator: Sheila Shivak

Area
  - Land: 1.79 km^{2} (0.69 sq mi)

Population (2016)
  - Total: 30
  - Density: 16.7/km^{2} (43/sq mi)
- Time zone: UTC-6 (CST)
- Postal code: S0A 0C0
- Area code: 306
- Highways: Highway 629
- Railways: Canadian National Railway

Atwater (2016 population: 30) is a village in the Canadian province of Saskatchewan within the Rural Municipality of Fertile Belt No. 183 and Census Division No. 5. The village is approximately 45 kilometres (28 mi) southeast of the city of Melville on Highway 629.

== History ==
Atwater incorporated as a village on August 12, 1910.

== Transportation ==
Canadian National Railway passes through Atwater. The line was originally built as part of the Grand Trunk Pacific Railway.

== Demographics ==
Population history (1981–2016)
Year	Pop.	±%
1981	64	—
1986	56	−12.5%
1991	31	−44.6%
1996	35	+12.9%
2001	30	−14.3%
2006	25	−16.7%
2011	31	+24.0%
2016	30	−3.2%
Source: Statistics Canada via Saskatchewan Bureau of Statistics

In the 2021 Census of Population conducted by Statistics Canada, Atwater had a population of 27 living in 11 of its 14 total private dwellings, a change of −10% from its 2016 population of 30. With a land area of 1.84 km^{2} (0.71 sq mi), it had a population density of 14.7/km^{2} (38.0/sq mi) in 2021.

In the 2016 Census of Population, the Village of Atwater recorded a population of 30 living in 14 of its 16 total private dwellings, a −3.3% change from its 2011 population of 31. With a land area of 1.79 km^{2} (0.69 sq mi), it had a population density of 16.8/km^{2} (43.4/sq mi) in 2016.

== Climate ==
Climate data for Atwater
Month	Jan	Feb	Mar	Apr	May	Jun	Jul	Aug	Sep	Oct	Nov	Dec	Year
Record high °C (°F)	7 (45)	11.5 (52.7)	21.5 (70.7)	31 (88)	38 (100)	37 (99)	38.5 (101.3)	37 (99)	35 (95)	33 (91)	20 (68)	14 (57)	38.5 (101.3)
Mean daily maximum °C (°F)	−11.9 (10.6)	−7.9 (17.8)	−0.9 (30.4)	10 (50)	18.1 (64.6)	22.3 (72.1)	24.8 (76.6)	24.1 (75.4)	17.8 (64.0)	10.3 (50.5)	−1.7 (28.9)	−9.8 (14.4)	7.9 (46.2)
Daily mean °C (°F)	−17.1 (1.2)	−12.9 (8.8)	−6 (21)	3.8 (38.8)	11.3 (52.3)	15.7 (60.3)	18 (64)	17 (63)	11.3 (52.3)	4.4 (39.9)	−6.1 (21.0)	−14.4 (6.1)	2.1 (35.8)
Mean daily minimum °C (°F)	−22.2 (−8.0)	−17.9 (−0.2)	−11 (12)	−2.4 (27.7)	4.4 (39.9)	9.1 (48.4)	11.2 (52.2)	9.9 (49.8)	4.7 (40.5)	−1.4 (29.5)	−10.5 (13.1)	−19 (−2)	−3.8 (25.2)
Record low °C (°F)	−42 (−44)	−42 (−44)	−34 (−29)	−27 (−17)	−16.5 (2.3)	−3 (27)	−0.5 (31.1)	−3.5 (25.7)	−8 (18)	−22 (−8)	−37 (−35)	−43 (−45)	−43 (−45)
Average precipitation mm (inches)	17.7 (0.70)	12.4 (0.49)	19.2 (0.76)	19.3 (0.76)	53.9 (2.12)	73 (2.9)	80.6 (3.17)	58.7 (2.31)	49.4 (1.94)	25.2 (0.99)	17.2 (0.68)	18.6 (0.73)	445.1 (17.52)
Source: Environment Canada

== See also ==
- List of communities in Saskatchewan
- List of villages in Saskatchewan
