= Burrows, Saskatchewan =

Community in Saskatchewan, Canada

Coordinates: 50°18′30″N 102°07′15″W

Location of Burrows in Saskatchewan

Burrows is an unincorporated community in the Canadian province of Saskatchewan, located along the Trans-Canada Highway (Hwy 1) in the Rural Municipality of Willowdale No. 153.
