= Crooked Lake Provincial Park =

Provincial park in Saskatchewan, Canada

- Location within Saskatchewan Location within Canada
- Interactive map of Crooked Lake Provincial Park
- Location: RM of Grayson No. 184, Saskatchewan, Canada
- Nearest city: Grenfell
- Coordinates: 50.6074°N 102.6733°W
- Established: 1986
- Governing body: Sask Parks

Crooked Lake Provincial Park is a recreational provincial park in the south-east region of the Canadian province of Saskatchewan. It is situated along the north-eastern shore of Crooked Lake in the Qu'Appelle Valley in the RM of Grayson No. 184. The community of Sunset Beach is adjacent to the eastern boundary of the park and access is from Highway 247.

Crooked Lake Provincial Park has a campground with electric and non-electric sites, potable water, showers, and washrooms. All of the campsites are a short distance from Crooked Lake, which has a beach and picnic area, boat launch, and fish cleaning station. Fish commonly found in the lake include walleye, perch, and northern pike.

== See also ==
- List of protected areas of Saskatchewan
- Tourism in Saskatchewan
