= Area codes 306, 639, and 474 =

Area codes for Saskatchewan, Canada

Coordinates: 54°30′30″N 105°40′00″W

Area codes 306, 639, and 474 are telephone area codes in the North American Numbering Plan (NANP) for the entire Canadian province of Saskatchewan. Area code 306 is one of the original North American area codes assigned in 1947. Area codes 639 and 474 were added to the numbering plan area in creation of an overlay complex for the entire province in 2013 and 2021, respectively. The incumbent local exchange carrier is SaskTel.

== History ==
When the American Telephone and Telegraph Company (AT&T) created the first nationwide telephone numbering plan in the second half of the 1940s, the United States and Canada were divided into 86 numbering plan areas. Saskatchewan received area code 306 in 1947.

By the mid-2000s, area code 306 came under the threat of central office code exhaustion because of demand for telecommunication services from the proliferation of cell phones and other mobile devices requiring unique telephone numbers, particularly in Regina and Saskatoon.

In long-term nationwide planning in October 2010, the Canadian Radio-television and Telecommunications Commission (CRTC) tentatively reserved a group of new area codes for future relief of existing numbering plan areas that were expected to exhaust in the next 25 years; area code 474 was set aside for relief of area code 306 in Saskatchewan.

In early 2011, the Canadian Numbering Administrator (CNA) determined that area code 306 had experienced an unforecasted surge in telephone number demand and was at risk of exhaustion within three years. In response, the CRTC initiated relief planning measures.

The planning committee considered various options, including a north–south split of the 306 numbering plan area. Under this plan, half of the province would keep area code 306, while the remainder would transition to a new area code. Ultimately, the committee opted for an overlay plan. Given the CRTC's decision the year before, the committee's initial planning document (dated May 18, 2011) recommended the assignment of area code 474 for this purpose, mirroring an assumption that had already been reported in the press.

By the time the committee's planning document was finalized on July 13, 2011, the recommended new area code had changed to 639, an option that was regarded as technically equally viable. The document did not address this divergence from the CRTC's prior allocation nor give a reason for the change, but news reports suggest that it was SaskTel who made the decision to eschew 474, citing a sensitivity to tetraphobia in the community, and that the choice of 639 as a replacement was based on its mathematical similarities with the existing area code.

An overlay with 639 allocated a total of 15.8 million telephone numbers to a province of just over one million people. The carriers wanted to spare existing subscribers, particularly in rural areas, the expense and burden of changing their numbers. Overlays have become the preferred method of area code relief in Canada, as they are a transparent method of relief. No area codes have been split in the country since 1999.

On August 26, 2011, the CRTC accepted the relief planning committee's recommendation. Ten-digit dialing was phased in for area code 306 starting on February 25, 2013. On that date, a permissive dialing period began during which seven- and ten-digit calls could complete. Ten-digit dialing became mandatory in Saskatchewan on May 11, 2013, two weeks before the in-service date of May 25. Beginning on September 26, 2013, standard error intercept announcements resumed. Until the implementation of the overlay, Saskatchewan was the last of Canada's original NPAs where seven-digit dialing was still possible.

In July 2018, area code 474 was reserved as a future area code for all of Saskatchewan, as area codes 306 and 639 are expected to exhaust their central office prefixes as early as June 2022. The in-service date of area code 474 was October 2, 2021, with no changes in the established dialing procedure.

== Service area ==
Arborfield, Balgonie, Battleford, Beauval, Borden, Bredenbury, Buchanan, Calder, Canora, Carrot River, Central Butte, Churchbridge, Colonsay, Craik, Crooked Lake, Dalmeny, Dubuc, Esterhazy, Estevan, Eston, Eyebrow, Foam Lake, Fort Qu'Appelle, Francis, Goodeve, Grayson, Hague, Hanley, Hodgeville, Hudson Bay, Humboldt, Invermay, Kamsack, Kelvington, Kindersley, Kenaston, Kinistino, Langenburg, La Ronge, Lemberg, East Lloydminster, Lumsden, Luseland, Marquis, Meadow Lake, Meath Park, Melfort, Melville, Milestone, Mistatim, Moose Jaw, Neilburg, Neudorf, Nipawin, Norquay, North Battleford, Pelly, Pilot Butte, Porcupine Plain, Preeceville, Prince Albert, Prud'homme, Radisson, Regina, Rhein, Rocanville, Rose Valley, Rouleau, Saltcoats, Saskatoon, Sheho, St. Isidore-de-Bellevue, Stockholm, Strasbourg, Sturgis, Swift Current, Theodore, Tisdale, Unity, Uranium City, Wadena, Watrous, Weldon, Weyburn, Wynyard, Yorkton,

== See also ==
- Canadian Numbering Administration Consortium
- List of North American Numbering Plan area codes
- Telephone numbers in Canada

Saskatchewan area codes: 306/474/639
| | North: 867 | |
| West: 403, 780, 368/587/825 | 306/639 | East: 204/431 |
| | South: 701, 406 | |
Yukon, Northwest Territories and Nunavut area codes: 867
Manitoba area codes: 204/431/584
Alberta area codes: 403, 587/825/368, 780
North Dakota area codes: 701
Montana area codes: 406
