= Stockholm, Saskatchewan =

Village in Saskatchewan, Canada

Stockholm
- Village
- Location within Saskatchewan Location within Canada
- Coordinates: 50.66°N 102.30°W
- Country: Canada
- Province: Saskatchewan
- Region: Southeast Saskatchewan
- Census division: 5
- Rural Municipality: Fertile Belt No. 183
- Post Office: 1904
- Incorporated: 1905

Government
  - Mayor: Jason Nichols
  - Administrator: Lorie Jackson
  - Governing body: Stockholm Town Council
  - MP Yorkton—Melville: Cathay Wagantall
  - MLA Melville-Saltcoats: Warren Kaeding

Area
  - Total: 1.65 km^{2} (0.64 sq mi)

Population (2021)
  - Total: 329
  - Density: 206.6/km^{2} (535/sq mi)
- Demonym: Stockholmite
- Time zone: CST
- Postal code: S0A 3Y0
- Area code: 306
- Highways: Highway 9 Highway 22
- Website: https://stockholmsask.com/

Stockholm (2021 population: 329) is a village in the Canadian province of Saskatchewan within the Rural Municipality of Fertile Belt No. 183 and Census Division No. 5. It is 72 kilometres (45 mi) south of the city of Yorkton along Highways 9 and 22. The municipal office for the Rural Municipality of Fertile Belt No. 183 is located in Stockholm.

== History ==
Named after the capital of Sweden, the village was founded in the 1880s by Swedish settlers. Stockholm incorporated as a village on June 30, 1905. According to a Village of Stockholm commemorative plaque dated July 1, 1995, A J Stenberg and wife Svea named the community.

Heritage properties

Landmarks in Stockholm include the New Stockholm Lutheran Church, also called the Swedish Evangelical Lutheran New Stockholm Church, which was erected in 1917 by Swedish immigrants.

== Demographics ==
Population history (1981–2016)
Year	Pop.	±%
1981	391	—
1986	406	+3.8%
1991	391	−3.7%
1996	356	−9.0%
2001	303	−14.9%
2006	323	+6.6%
2011	341	+5.6%
2016	352	+3.2%
Source: Statistics Canada via Saskatchewan Bureau of Statistics

In the 2021 Census of Population conducted by Statistics Canada, Stockholm had a population of 329 living in 144 of its 173 total private dwellings, a change of −6.5% from its 2016 population of 352. With a land area of 1.63 km^{2} (0.63 sq mi), it had a population density of 201.8/km^{2} (522.8/sq mi) in 2021.

In the 2016 Census of Population, the Village of Stockholm recorded a population of 352 living in 168 of its 178 total private dwellings, a 3.1% change from its 2011 population of 341. With a land area of 1.65 km^{2} (0.64 sq mi), it had a population density of 213.3/km^{2} (552.5/sq mi) in 2016.

== Media ==
From 1997 to 2007, Jody Herperger operated an FM radio-rebroadcaster CFZY-FM for CHOZ-FM (St. John's, Newfoundland and Labrador). The station filled a need for commercial top-40 programming on the FM band. The station was maintained for a number of years after CFGW-FM in Yorkton started commercial broadcasting, and ended transmissions in 2007.

== See also ==
- List of villages in Saskatchewan
