= Round Lake (Saskatchewan) =

Lake in Saskatchewan, Canada

- Location of the lake in Saskatchewan Round Lake (Canada)
- Location: Saskatchewan, Canada
- Coordinates: 50.5333°N 102.3672°W
- Lake type: Prairie lake
- Part of: Red River drainage basin
- Primary inflows: Qu'Appelle River
- Primary outflows: Qu'Appelle River
- Basin countries: Canada
- Surface area: 1,155.4 ha (2,855 acres)
- Shore length^{1}: 22 km (14 mi)
- Surface elevation: 439 m (1,440 ft)
- Settlements: Bird's Point; West End; Pelican Shores; Espeseth Cove
- ^{1} Shore length is not a well-defined measure.

Round Lake is the last part of a chain of eutrophic prairie lakes connected by the Qu'Appelle River in the Canadian province of Saskatchewan. The lakes were formed by glaciation about 10,000 years ago.

The lake harbours recreational activities including camping, boating, and fishing. Cabins can be rented or bought along the shores of the lake. Camping is provided at Bird's Point Resort and West End. Other camps include Camp O'Neill and Camp McKay. Access to the lake is provided by Highway 247. Crooked Lake Provincial Park and Crooked Lake are 20 kilometres (12 mi) west. A scenic viewpoint, located north of the lake and highway, provides a view of the lake.

== Fish species ==
Fish species found in round include walleye, yellow perch, northern pike, white sucker, longnose sucker, black bullhead, channel catfish, cisco, mooneye, bigmouth buffalo, burbot, common carp, and rock bass.

== See also ==
- List of lakes of Saskatchewan
