= Rural Municipality of Fertile Belt No. 183 =

Rural municipality in Saskatchewan, Canada

Fertile Belt No. 183
- Rural municipality
- Rural Municipality of Fertile Belt No. 183
- Location of the RM of Fertile Belt No. 183 in Saskatchewan
- Coordinates: 50.618°N 102.232°W
- Country: Canada
- Province: Saskatchewan
- Census division: 5
- SARM division: 1
- Formed: January 1, 1913

Government
  - Reeve: Arlynn Kurtz
  - Governing body: RM of Fertile Belt No. 183 Council
  - Administrator: Lorie Jackson
  - Office location: Stockholm

Area (2016)
  - Land: 1,006.67 km^{2} (388.68 sq mi)

Population (2016)
  - Total: 781
  - Density: 0.8/km^{2} (2.1/sq mi)
- Time zone: CST
  - Summer (DST): CST
- Area codes: 306 and 639

The Rural Municipality of Fertile Belt No. 183 (2016 population: 781) is a rural municipality (RM) in the Canadian province of Saskatchewan within Census Division No. 5 and SARM Division No. 1.

== History ==
The RM of Fertile Belt No. 183 incorporated as a rural municipality on January 1, 1913.

Historical properties

There are two historical properties located within the RM.

- Our Lady of Assumption (Kaposvar) Roman Catholic Church - (also called Kaposvar Museum) Located in Esterhazy, the building was erected in 1906-1907 by Brothers of Father Jules Pirot with Hungarian farmers hauling stones from the surrounding area.
- New Stockholm Lutheran Church - (also called Swedish Evangelical Lutheran New Stockholm Church) the building was erected in 1917 by Swedish immigrants. The church is located in the village of Stockholm.

== Geography ==
=== Communities and localities ===
The following urban municipalities are surrounded by the RM.

Towns

- Esterhazy

Villages

- Atwater
- Bangor
- Stockholm

The following unincorporated communities are within the RM.

Organized hamlets

- Pelican Shores

Localities

- Zeneta

== Demographics ==
Population history (1981–2016)
Year	Pop.	±%
1981	1,319	—
1986	1,153	−12.6%
1991	1,091	−5.4%
1996	962	−11.8%
2001	872	−9.4%
2006	771	−11.6%
2011	816	+5.8%
2016	781	−4.3%
Source: Statistics Canada via Saskatchewan Bureau of Statistics

In the 2021 Census of Population conducted by Statistics Canada, the RM of Fertile Belt No. 183 had a population of 727 living in 309 of its 345 total private dwellings, a change of −6.9% from its 2016 population of 781. With a land area of 1,001.93 km^{2} (386.85 sq mi), it had a population density of 0.7/km^{2} (1.9/sq mi) in 2021.

In the 2016 Census of Population, the RM of Fertile Belt No. 183 recorded a population of 781 living in 334 of its 377 total private dwellings, a −0.5% change from its 2011 population of 785. With a land area of 1,006.67 km^{2} (388.68 sq mi), it had a population density of 0.8/km^{2} (2.0/sq mi) in 2016.

== Government ==
The RM of Fertile Belt No. 183 is governed by an elected municipal council and an appointed administrator that meets on the second Tuesday of every month. The reeve of the RM is Arlynn Kurtz while its administrator is Lorie Jackson. The RM's office is located in Stockholm.

== Transportation ==
The Esterhazy Airport is located within the rural municipality.
