= Grayson, Saskatchewan =

Village in Saskatchewan, Canada

Grayson
- Village
- Village of Grayson
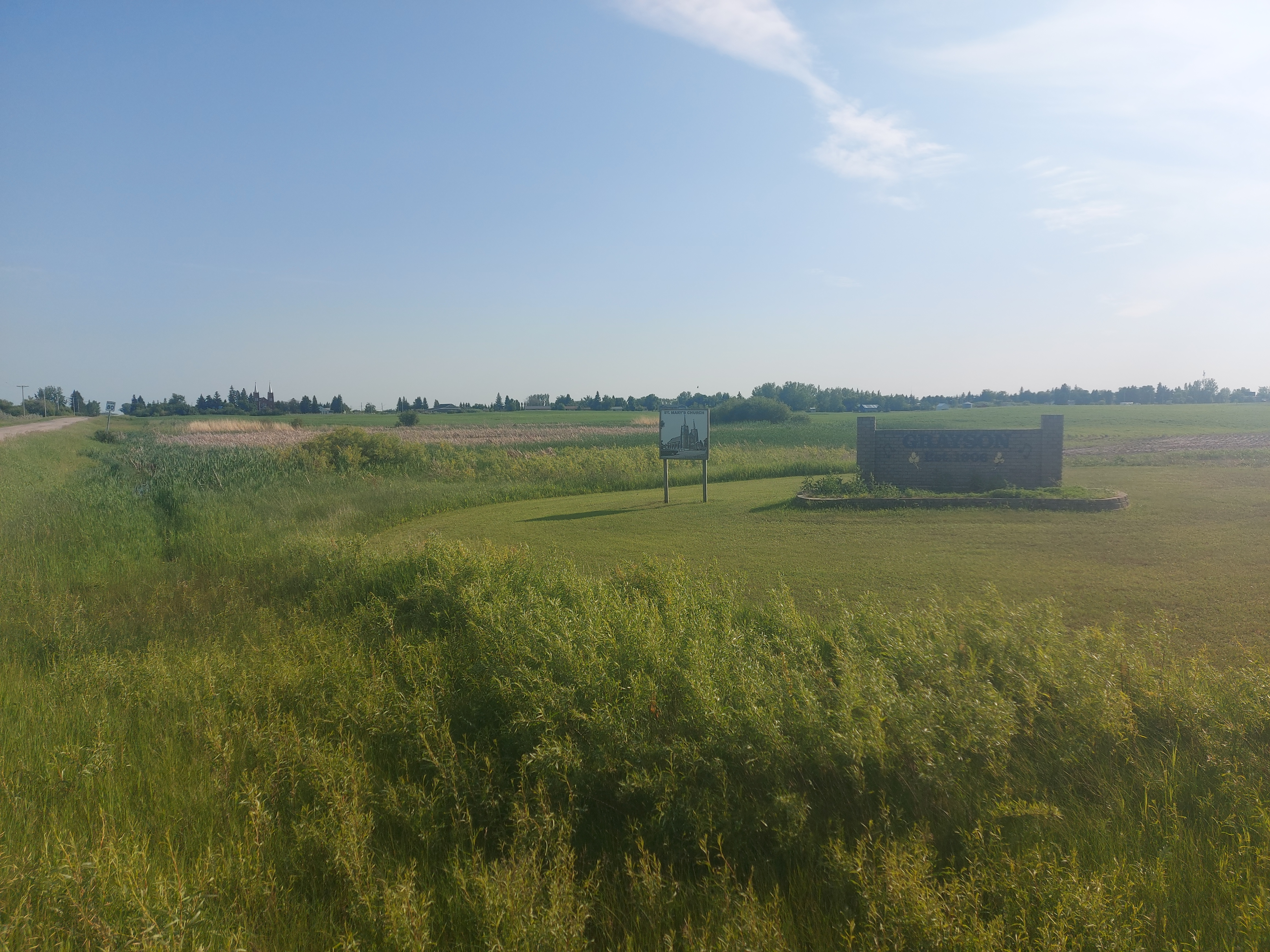
- Grayson

- Location of Grayson Grayson (Canada)
- Coordinates: 50°43′10″N 102°38′43″W
- Country: Canada
- Province: Saskatchewan
- Region: South-central
- Census division: 5
- Rural Municipality: Grayson
- Post office Founded: 1906

Government
  - Type: Municipal
  - Governing body: Grayson Village Council
  - Mayor: Riley Ottenbreit
  - Administrator: Colleen Stinson
  - MP: Cathay Wagantall
  - MLA: Warren Kaeding

Area
  - Total: 1.87 km^{2} (0.72 sq mi)

Population (2021)
  - Total: 195
  - Density: 98.9/km^{2} (256/sq mi)
- Time zone: UTC-6 (CST)
- Postal code: S0A 1E0
- Area code: 306
- Highways: Highway 22 Highway 605
- Railways: Abandoned

Grayson (2021 population: 185) is a village in the Canadian province of Saskatchewan within the Rural Municipality of Grayson No. 184 and Census Division No. 5.

== History ==
Grayson incorporated as a village on April 19, 1906. Grayson celebrated its 100th anniversary in 2006.

== Demographics ==
Population history (1981–2021)
Year	Pop.	±%
1981	264	—
1986	275	+4.2%
1991	256	−6.9%
1996	223	−12.9%
2001	210	−5.8%
2006	179	−14.8%
2011	184	+2.8%
2016	211	+14.7%
2021	185	−12.3%
Source: Statistics Canada via Saskatchewan Bureau of Statistics

In the 2021 Census of Population conducted by Statistics Canada, Grayson had a population of 185 living in 98 of its 112 total private dwellings, a change of −12.3% from its 2016 population of 211. With a land area of 1.79 km^{2} (0.69 sq mi), it had a population density of 103.4/km^{2} (267.7/sq mi) in 2021.

In the 2016 Census of Population, the Village of Grayson recorded a population of 211 living in 101 of its 117 total private dwellings, a 12.8% change from its 2011 population of 184. With a land area of 1.87 km^{2} (0.72 sq mi), it had a population density of 112.8/km^{2} (292.2/sq mi) in 2016.

== Economy ==
Like many small Saskatchewan communities, Grayson was built along a railway which no longer exists. It no longer has a grain elevator, but a few unique businesses and its proximity to Melville allow it to prosper, particularly the meat plant at Ottenbreit's Meats (source of the famous 'Grayson Sausage'). As of 2026, the median household income was $55,104 CAD.

Grayson also possesses a post office, modern grocery/cafe, hardware store, plumbers, tavern, elementary school, village and Rural Municipality offices, business services and computer technical services. There is also a dance hall, and a seniors centre.

== See also ==
- List of communities in Saskatchewan
- List of villages in Saskatchewan
