= Sunset Beach, Saskatchewan =

Community in Saskatchewan, Canada

Coordinates: 50°35′32″N 102°39′34″W

Sunset Beach is a hamlet on the northern shore of Crooked Lake in the Canadian province of Saskatchewan. Access is from Highway 247.

== Demographics ==
In the 2021 Census of Population conducted by Statistics Canada, Sunset Beach had a population of 61 living in 30 of its 71 total private dwellings, a change of 60.5% from its 2016 population of 38. With a land area of 0.21 km^{2} (0.081 sq mi), it had a population density of 290.5/km^{2} (752.3/sq mi) in 2021.
