= Rural Municipality of Grayson No. 184 =

Rural municipality in Saskatchewan, Canada

Grayson No. 184
- Rural municipality
- Rural Municipality of Grayson No. 184
- Location of the RM of Grayson No. 184 in Saskatchewan
- Coordinates: 50.635°N 102.617°W
- Country: Canada
- Province: Saskatchewan
- Census division: 5
- SARM division: 1
- Formed: January 1, 1913

Government
  - Reeve: Harvey Mucha
  - Governing body: RM of Grayson No. 184 Council
  - Administrator: Sarah Dietrich
  - Office location: Grayson

Area (2016)
  - Land: 874.77 km^{2} (337.75 sq mi)

Population (2016)
  - Total: 512
  - Density: 0.6/km^{2} (1.6/sq mi)
- Time zone: CST
  - Summer (DST): CST
- Area codes: 306 and 639

The Rural Municipality of Grayson No. 184 (2016 population: 512) is a rural municipality (RM) in the Canadian province of Saskatchewan within Census Division No. 5 and SARM Division No. 1.

== History ==
The RM of Grayson No. 184 incorporated as a rural municipality on January 1, 1913.

== Geography ==
=== Communities and localities ===
The following urban municipalities are surrounded by the RM.

- Dubuc
- Grayson
- Killaly

The following unincorporated communities are within the RM.

Organized hamlets

- Exner's Twin Bays
- Greenspot
- Moose Bay
- Sunset Beach

== Demographics ==
Population history (1981–2016)
Year	Pop.	±%
1981	933	—
1986	831	−10.9%
1991	763	−8.2%
1996	653	−14.4%
2001	550	−15.8%
2006	542	−1.5%
2011	495	−8.7%
2016	512	+3.4%
Source: Statistics Canada via Saskatchewan Bureau of Statistics

In the 2021 Census of Population conducted by Statistics Canada, the RM of Grayson No. 184 had a population of 547 living in 232 of its 351 total private dwellings, a change of 6.8% from its 2016 population of 512. With a land area of 862.8 km^{2} (333.1 sq mi), it had a population density of 0.6/km^{2} (1.6/sq mi) in 2021.

In the 2016 Census of Population, the RM of Grayson No. 184 recorded a population of 512 living in 219 of its 324 total private dwellings, a 7.1% change from its 2011 population of 478. With a land area of 874.77 km^{2} (337.75 sq mi), it had a population density of 0.6/km^{2} (1.5/sq mi) in 2016.

== Government ==
The RM of Grayson No. 184 is governed by an elected municipal council and an appointed administrator that meets on the second Wednesday of every month. The reeve of the RM is Harvey Mucha while its administrator is Sarah Dietrich. The RM's office is located in Grayson.
