= Dubuc, Saskatchewan =

Village in Saskatchewan, Canada

Dubuc
- Village
- Village of Dubuc
- Location of Dubuc in Saskatchewan Dubuc (Canada)
- Coordinates: 50.684°N 102.479°W
- Country: Canada
- Province: Saskatchewan
- Region: Saskatchewan
- Census division: 5
- Rural Municipality: Grayson No. 184
- Incorporated (Village): N/A

Government
  - Type: Municipal
  - Governing body: Dubuc Village Council
  - Mayor: Peter Nielsen
  - Administrator: Janet Siever

Area
  - Total: 0.63 km^{2} (0.24 sq mi)

Population (2016)
  - Total: 61
  - Density: 96.5/km^{2} (250/sq mi)
- Time zone: UTC-6 (CST)
- Postal code: S0A 0R0
- Area code: 306
- Highways: Highway 9 Highway 22 Highway 638

Dubuc (2016 population: 61) is a village in the Canadian province of Saskatchewan within the Rural Municipality of Grayson No. 184 and Census Division No. 5. The village is 55 kilometres (34 mi) south of the city of Yorkton and 30 kilometres (19 mi) west of Esterhazy.

== History ==
Dubuc incorporated as a village on May 29, 1905.

== Demographics ==
Population history (1981–2016)
Year	Pop.	±%
1981	129	—
1986	110	−14.7%
1991	99	−10.0%
1996	95	−4.0%
2001	80	−15.8%
2006	55	−31.2%
2011	70	+27.3%
2016	61	−12.9%
Source: Statistics Canada via Saskatchewan Bureau of Statistics

In the 2021 Census of Population conducted by Statistics Canada, Dubuc had a population of 71 living in 37 of its 45 total private dwellings, a change of 16.4% from its 2016 population of 61. With a land area of 0.61 km^{2} (0.24 sq mi), it had a population density of 116.4/km^{2} (301.5/sq mi) in 2021.

In the 2016 Census of Population, the Village of Dubuc recorded a population of 61 living in 33 of its 46 total private dwellings, a −14.8% change from its 2011 population of 70. With a land area of 0.63 km^{2} (0.24 sq mi), it had a population density of 96.8/km^{2} (250.8/sq mi) in 2016.

== See also ==
- List of communities in Saskatchewan
- List of villages in Saskatchewan
