= Crooked Lake (Saskatchewan) =

Lake in Saskatchewan, Canada

- Location in Saskatchewan Crooked Lake (Canada)
- Location: RM of Grayson No. 184, Saskatchewan
- Group: Fishing Lakes
- Coordinates: 50.605°N 102.737°W
- Type: Reservoir
- Primary inflows: Qu'Appelle River
- Primary outflows: Qu'Appelle River
- Catchment area: Red River drainage basin
- Basin countries: Canada
- Surface area: 1,644.8 ha (4,064 acres)
- Max. depth: 15 m (49 ft)
- Water volume: 119,000 dam^{3} (96,000 acre⋅ft)
- Shore length^{1}: 35.91 km (22.31 mi)
- Surface elevation: 447 m (1,467 ft)
- ^{1} Shore length is not a well-defined measure.

Crooked Lake is a recreational lake located in the south-eastern region of the Canadian province of Saskatchewan. It is part of a chain of lakes — the Fishing Lakes — in the Qu'Appelle Valley and, like many of the other lakes in the valley, there is a dam at the eastern end that controls water levels.

The majority of the southern and western shores of the lake are undeveloped and part of First Nation Indian reserves. Most of the development is along the northern and eastern shores and includes cabins, resorts, campgrounds, beaches, and several communities, including Moose Bay, Sunset Beach, Exner's Twin Bays, Greenspot, Melville Beach, Grenfell Beach, and Marieval. Access to the lake and most of its amenities is from Highway 247.

== Recreation ==
Crooked Lake offers a variety of activities during both the summer and the winter. During the summer, there is fishing from both boats and docks, various water sports, camping, picnicking, swimming, and hiking. The Trans Canada Trail runs through the valley and along the lake's northern shore. The winter has ice fishing and snowmobiling.

=== Crooked Lake Provincial Park ===
Along the north-eastern shore of the lake is Crooked Lake Provincial Park. The park has campgrounds, a swimming area, a boat launch, and a playground. The Trans Canada Trail makes its way through this scenic area.

=== Cedar Cove ===
Cedar Cove is found along the eastern side of the lake with beach access for swimming and boating. There are 80 full-service campsites with washroom facilities, including showers, and a convenience store. There is also a large boat storage yard and provisions for docks and boat lifts.

=== Coyote Gulch Campgrounds ===
Coyote Gulch is a seasonal campground located along the north-eastern side of Crooked Lake. The park has 56 full service RV trailer sites, a boat dock, playground, fire pits, showers, bathrooms, and laundry facilities.

=== Sunset Beach ===
Located at the eastern end of the lake is Sunset Beach. Run by the Criddle family since 1920, it encompasses 22 campsites, a full service convenience store, and a small arcade. There is also a beach and swim area which contains a playground, a boat launch, and beach volleyball courts. Every Sunday from June to September, local farmers bring fresh vegetables, fruit, meat, and baked goods to sell at the flea market.

=== Last Oak Golf and Country Club ===
On Cowessess First Nation land is Last Oak Golf and Country Club, an 18-hole golf course, equipped with a pro shop, restaurant, and lounge. The course is a par 72 with 6558 total yards.

== Crooked Lake Dam ==
Crooked Lake Dam (50.5875°N 102.6650°W) was built in 1941 to help regulate lake water levels. The dam is located at the eastern end of the lake on the Cowessess 73 Indian reserve. It is a nine-bay concrete and timber dam that is 3.5 metres (11 ft) high and has a reservoir capacity of 119,000 dam^{3} (96,000 acre⋅ft). After flooding settlements were reached with the federal government and the local First Nations for previous flooding issues, it was announced in 2015 that the dam will get a $6 to $8 million upgrade. As recently as 2011 and 2014, lake water levels over-topped the dam.

== Fish species ==
Fish species commonly found in Crooked Lake include northern pike, walleye, and yellow perch.

== See also ==
- Saskatchewan Water Security Agency
- List of dams and reservoirs in Canada
- List of lakes of Saskatchewan
