= Division No. 5, Saskatchewan =

Census division in Canada

Coordinates: 50°24′37″N 102°56′01″W

Division No. 5
- Census division in Saskatchewan
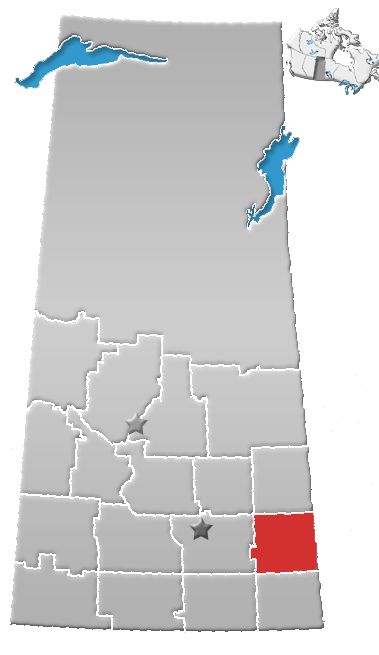
- Country: Canada
- Province: Saskatchewan

Area
  - Total: 14,779.44 km^{2} (5,706.37 sq mi)
- As of 2016

Population (2016)
  - Total: 31,750
  - Density: 2.148/km^{2} (5.564/sq mi)

Division No. 5 is one of eighteen census divisions in the province of Saskatchewan, Canada, as defined by Statistics Canada. It is located in the east-southeastern part of the province, bordering Manitoba. The most populous community in this division is Melville.

== Demographics ==
In the 2021 Census of Population conducted by Statistics Canada, Division No. 5 had a population of 31,583 living in 13,383 of its 15,723 total private dwellings, a change of −0.5% from its 2016 population of 31,750. With a land area of 14,441.65 km^{2} (5,575.95 sq mi), it had a population density of 2.2/km^{2} (5.7/sq mi) in 2021.

Knowledge of languages in Division No. 5 (1991−2021)
Language	2021		2011		2001		1991	
Language	Pop.	%	Pop.	%	Pop.	%	Pop.	%
English	30,835	99.84%	31,365	99.81%	31,875	99.97%	36,750	99.88%
Tagalog	675	2.19%	180	0.57%	0	0%	10	0.03%
French	660	2.14%	755	2.4%	765	2.4%	1,040	2.83%
German (Note: Combined responses of the High German languages, including Standard German, Pennsylvania German, Swiss German, and Yiddish.)	510	1.65%	705	2.24%	1,620	5.08%	2,725	7.41%
Spanish	355	1.15%	100	0.32%	70	0.22%	75	0.2%
Ukrainian	225	0.73%	400	1.27%	700	2.2%	990	2.69%
Cree (Note: Combined responses of the Cree-Innu languages, previously categorized under "Cree" in past censuses.)	215	0.7%	135	0.43%	240	0.75%	140	0.38%
Hungarian	110	0.36%	210	0.67%	585	1.83%	690	1.88%
Russian	110	0.36%	95	0.3%	25	0.08%	30	0.08%
Chinese (Note: Combined responses of the Chinese languages, including Mandarin, Cantonese, Min Nan, Hakka, Wu (Shanghainese), Min Dong, Chinese, n.o.s., and Chinese languages, n.i.e..)	105	0.34%	55	0.18%	60	0.19%	70	0.19%
Punjabi	100	0.32%	0	0%	0	0%	0	0%
Hindustani (Note: Combined responses of Hindi and Urdu as they form mutually intelligible registers of the Hindustani language.)	95	0.31%	0	0%	10	0.03%	30	0.08%
Polish	35	0.11%	40	0.13%	185	0.58%	420	1.14%
Persian (Note: Combined responses of Iranian Persian, Dari, and Persian (Farsi), n.o.s., as they form mutually intelligible registers of the Persian language)	25	0.08%	0	0%	0	0%	0	0%
Arabic	20	0.06%	0	0%	10	0.03%	0	0%
Dutch	15	0.05%	90	0.29%	100	0.31%	45	0.12%
Portuguese	10	0.03%	0	0%	10	0.03%	10	0.03%
Italian	0	0%	0	0%	30	0.09%	0	0%
Greek	0	0%	0	0%	20	0.06%	60	0.16%
Total responses	30,885	97.79%	31,425	98.18%	31,885	98.13%	36,795	98.38%
Total population	31,583	100%	32,007	100%	32,492	100%	37,399	100%

== Census subdivisions ==
The following census subdivisions (municipalities or municipal equivalents) are located within Saskatchewan's Division No. 5.

=== Cities ===
- Melville

=== Towns ===
- Bredenbury
- Broadview
- Churchbridge
- Esterhazy
- Fleming
- Grenfell
- Kipling
- Langenburg
- Lemberg
- Moosomin
- Rocanville
- Saltcoats
- Wapella
- Whitewood
- Wolseley

=== Villages ===
- Atwater
- Bangor
- Dubuc
- Duff
- Fenwood
- Gerald
- Glenavon
- Goodeve
- Grayson
- Killaly
- MacNutt
- Neudorf
- Spy Hill
- Stockholm
- Tantallon
- Waldron
- Welwyn
- Windthorst
- Yarbo

=== Resort villages ===
- Bird's Point
- Melville Beach
- West End

=== Rural municipalities ===
- RM No. 121 Moosomin
- RM No. 122 Martin
- RM No. 123 Silverwood
- RM No. 124 Kingsley
- RM No. 125 Chester
- RM No. 151 Rocanville
- RM No. 152 Spy Hill
- RM No. 153 Willowdale
- RM No. 154 Elcapo
- RM No. 155 Wolseley
- RM No. 181 Langenburg
- RM No. 183 Fertile Belt
- RM No. 184 Grayson
- RM No. 185 McLeod
- RM No. 211 Churchbridge
- RM No. 213 Saltcoats
- RM No. 214 Cana
- RM No. 215 Stanley

=== Indian reserves ===
- Cowessess First Nation
  - Cowessess 73
- Kahkewistahaw First Nation
  - Kahkewistahaw 72
- Ochapowace Nation
  - Ochapowace 71
  - Ochapowace 71-7
  - Ochapowace 71-10
  - Ochapowace 71-18
  - Ochapowace 71-26
  - Ochapowace 71-44
  - Ochapowace 71-51
  - Ochapowace 71-54
  - Ochapowace 71-70
- Sakimay First Nation
  - Little Bone 74B
  - Sakimay 74
  - Shesheep 74A

== See also ==
- List of census divisions of Saskatchewan
- List of communities in Saskatchewan
