= Kinistino (disambiguation) =

Kinistino is a town in Saskatchewan, Canada.

Kinistino may also refer to:

- Rural Municipality of Kinistino No. 459, rural municipality of Saskatchewan
- Kinistino (Saskatchewan provincial electoral district), former Saskatchewan provincial electoral district
- Kinistino (N.W.T. electoral district), former Northwest Territories territorial electoral district
- Erroll Kinistino (born 1951/52), Canadian actor, director, musician and speaker

== See also ==
- Melfort (provincial electoral district), former Saskatchewan provincial electoral district known as Melfort-Kinistino from 1971 to 1975
