= St. Hubert Mission =

Community in Saskatchewan, Canada

Coordinates: 50°13′00″N 102°21′02″W

Location in Saskatchewan

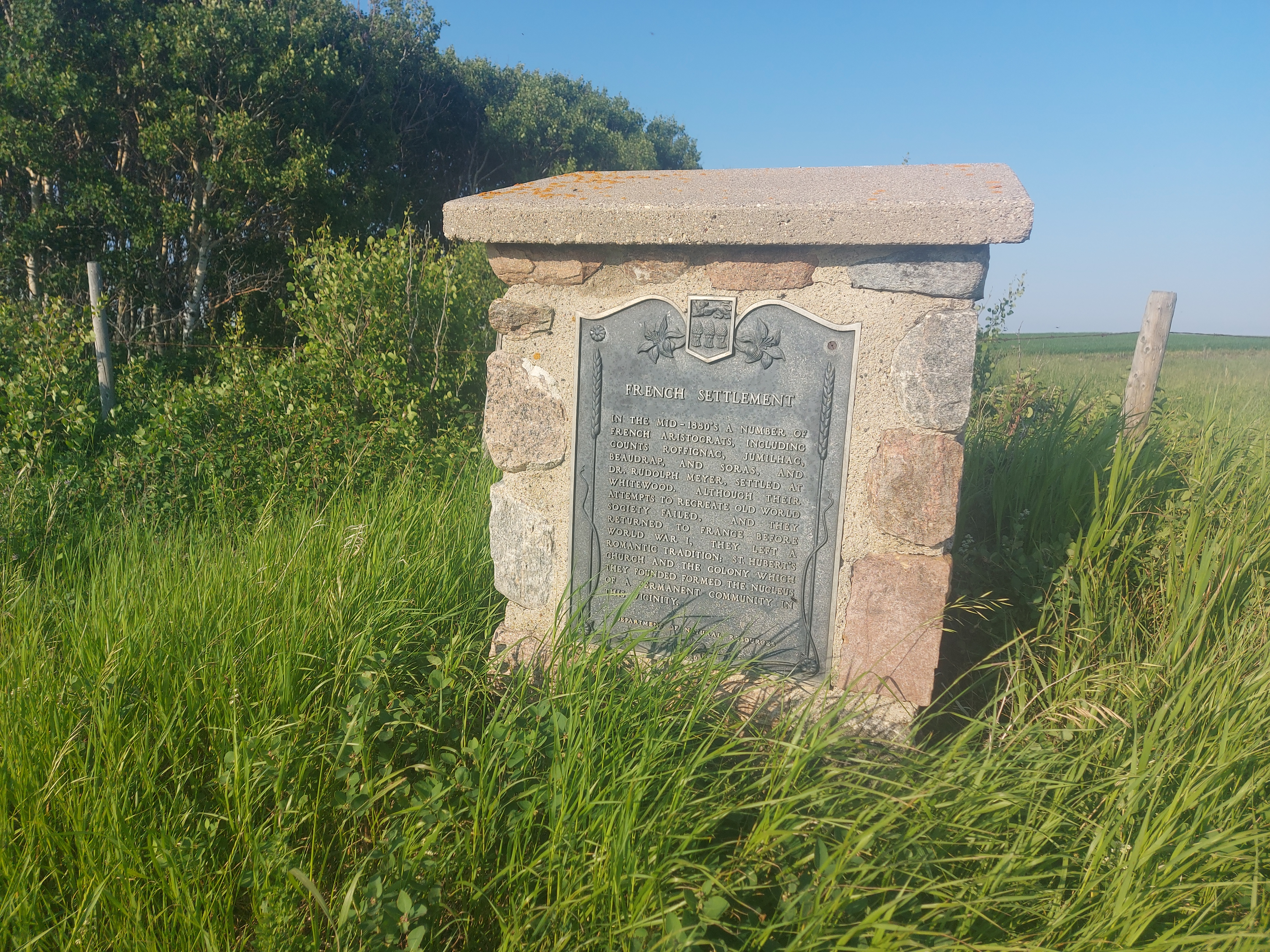
St. Hubert Mission Cairn alongside Highway 9

St. Hubert Mission is a former community in the Canadian province of Saskatchewan, originally settled by French Counts. It was located on Pipestone Creek, about 14 kilometres (8.7 mi) south-west of Whitewood. Access is from Highway 703. The French Counts of St Hubert stayed in the area between 1884 and the early 1900s, before World War I. St. Hubert is classified presently as an unincorporated area in the Rural Municipality of Silverwood No. 123. Dr. Rudolph Meyer was the initial European to arrive followed by others who established ranches in the vicinity of St. Hubert and Whitewood.

== The 'French Counts' and the origins of St. Hubert ==
The French-speaking settlement of St. Hubert is atypical of the communities that developed in the wake of immigration into Western Canada. As Father B. Fallourd, parish priest at St. Hubert from 1918 to 1949, wrote in History of the Beginning of St. Hubert Mission, "…the chief originality of the parish of St. Hubert (is that it) happened to be the first and only group comprising French-speaking Catholics. All came directly from France and Belgium to St. Hubert as settlers, which was erected in a parish in the limits of the Diocese of Regina and even in the whole of Saskatchewan and Alberta."

== Early settlement patterns ==
To understand how this came about, one must look back to the last quarter of the nineteenth century. When the West was being settled primarily by individual homesteaders, nine French counts, one Belgian baron and his brother, and three men of capital sought to transplant from the 'Old World' the socio-economic and cultural traditions of the French noblesse oblige. Though for the most part their efforts were unsuccessful, with all leaving the district before 1914, they left a lasting imprint on the community. Their brief tenure on the Pipestone Creek can be viewed as a golden age in the development of St. Hubert.

One of the above-mentioned fourteen plutocrats (the group hereafter will be known as 'the Counts'), of unknown name, declared in the early 1890s to one of the first non-aristocratic settlers in the district. Mr. Frank Dunand, "Everything in this country is better than in the old country." In so indicating his almost boundless optimism regarding Canada, and his equally boundless pessimism regarding France and Belgium, the aristocrat suggested why he and his compatriots had set out for the Pipestone. The Counts probably sought escape from the adverse social, economic, and political changes that were threatening to undermine their way of life in Europe.

Their standard of living had been considerably reduced by a depression and by an increasing tax load. The Canadian frontier contrasted favourably, as a report in the January 1891 issue of the Winnipeg newspaper The Colonist reveals: "The settlers ... express themselves to be heartily glad to escape the excessive taxation, exacted from them while in the old country." They also claim that fifty percent less labour is to be expended to produce an equal result with that obtained at home, while fertilizing can be entirely dispensed with.^{[A]}

== Unfavourable conditions in Old France ==
The plutocrats in addition had witnessed by the early 1880s the effective elimination of Monarchist influence in the upper reaches of the French government. The hated anti-Monarchist coalition of Opportunist Republicans and Radical Republicans had secured control of the French Chamber. The coalition had dedicated itself to purging the civil service and judiciary of monarchist sympathizers. The "cement" of the coalition, as the French Catholic Deputy Albert de Mun had observed, was "religious war". By 1882, the government had introduced legislation (secularizing/laicisating) primary schools, and by 1886 had excluded nuns and monks from teaching in state schools. The public school system was now to be staffed exclusively by lay personnel. The New Land probably offered to the Counts a new hope for survival of traditional society. On the Pipestone, they could build an aristocratic, Catholic, French 'island' far removed from such troubled waters.

== Early arrivals ==
The first settlers in the St. Hubert area, which then was a part of the South Provisional District of Assiniboia, North-West Territories, were Doctor Rudolph Meyer, an Alsacian (German)-born agriculturalist of Maule, Seine-et-Oise, France, Meyer's cousin and a future bride of unknown name, and his gardener, Emile Renoult, of Marc, Seine-et-Oise, France. Due to conflicting reports, it is difficult to ascertain when the three arrived. Fr. Fallourd mentions that they landed in late May 1886. Donatien Fremont, in La Liberte et la Patriote (1958), disagrees. He places the time of their arrival in the spring of 1885. Joe Sage, who was still living in the St. Hubert district in 1980, believes that they landed before 1885. He recalls that his father, Jean Sage, arrived in the district in 1886. Jean immediately began working for Count de Saurras, of Annonay, France, who had built his house one year earlier in 1885. Since Meyer, his cousin and Renoult seem to have arrived before de Saunas, this leads Mr. Sage to believe that the three may have arrived in 1884, possibly even in 1883. Kristian Sullivan, who presented a talk about the Counts of St. Hubert to the Society for Historical Archaeology places the settlement at 1885 initiated by Meyer and le Comte Yves de Roffignac from Gascony. Alan Andersen contributor to the Encyclopaedia of Saskatchewan places their arrival at 1884. The Encyclopedia of Canada's peoples places the arrival of eleven aristocrats to St-Hubert in 1889. Whatever the year of the arrival, there is no disputing the fact that they arrived sometime after 1882, when the Canadian Pacific Railway passed through Whitewood/Pipestone Valley, Meyer mentions that he had been advised by William Cornelius Van Horne and Mr. Pope to choose the area. At the time Van Horne was directing the construction of the transcontinental railway, and Pope was Conservative Minister of Railways.

== la Rolanderie ==
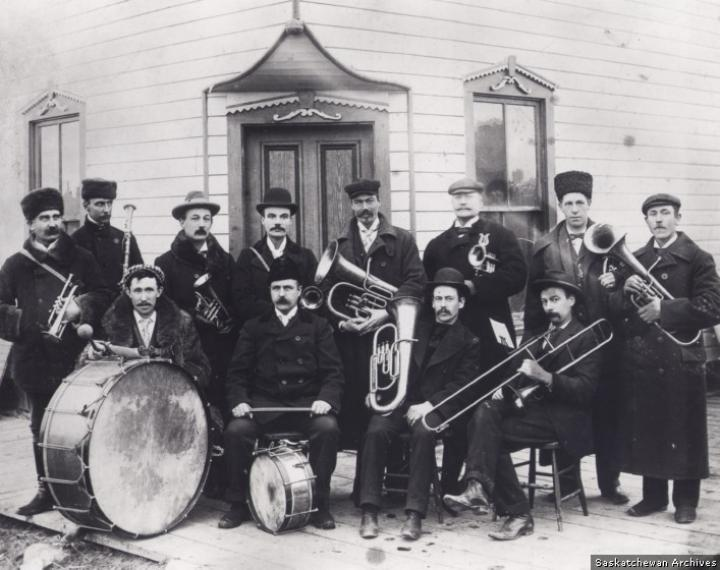
The Whitewood band, including some of the French aristocrats from St. Hubert, previously La Rolanderie, 1904

In an article written in a November 1978 issue of The Whitewood Herald, Ruth Humphreys, who had written many articles on the Counts tells us that the Valley and surrounding countryside so impressed the settlers that one of them exclaimed, "one could pasture a thousand goats here!" They apparently agreed that the land was well suited for producing cereal crops and raising livestock. After consulting with his cousin, Meyer decided to homestead on SE Township 4 - Range 15 - West of the Third Principal Meridian. He built his home and christened it 'la Rolanderie', in tribute to his employer, Monsieur Lorin, of Maule, Seine-et-Oise, France. (Lorin's chateau also was named la Rolanderie). The house, located in the Pipestone Valley about one mile (1.6 km) west of Joe Sage's farm, is owned by the Poncelet family.

The name 'la Rolanderie' became synonymous with the name of the district, until approximately 1890 when the St. Hubert parish was founded. It is possible, as Fr. Fallourd suggests, that the district was named Rolanderie because Lorin had decreed that "the colony...was to be given the name." The more convincing explanation is that the district was so named because the Rolanderie farm was both the first and the largest of the farms to be established. It moreover served as a half-way house for CPR land guides and prospective settlers: much to Meyer's chagrin, for he complained in one of his letters, "I give them plentiful lodging and plentiful board without asking of either a cent." While at 'la Rolanderie', Meyer seems to have acted as a settlement agent for a Societe Anonyme (Anonymous Society; the French term for limited-liability corporation). Fr. Fallourd writes that Meyer had been granted 100,000 francs (CA$20,000) by Lorin, a member of this organization, in order to establish a settlement on the Pipestone.^{[B]}

The Doctor's job, according to Humphreys, probably included acquiring and subdividing land, helping the new settlers to build their homes, lending them money and machinery when necessary, and setting up small businesses. By 1889, when Meyer was replaced at Rolanderie by Count de Roffignac of Limousin, France, he had increased the holdings of the ranch to include large herds of bovine shorthorn cattle, purebred horses (bred for sale to the French army), and pigs, and had expanded the size of the farm to 4,480 acres (1,810 ha). However the herd of pigs did not flourish due to a lack of feed as there was a shortage of grain produced by the Counts.

== Homestead details ==
A title dated March 23, 1889 and made out to the 'Rolanderie Farming and Stock Raising Company, Ltd.', the new owner of the operation after 1889, indicates that Rolanderie consisted of eighteen quarters in Township fourteen (Sections 31, 33, 35, and the east half of 34) and twelve quarters in Township fifteen (sections 4 and 9, and the south halves of sections 5 and 3.) It is difficult to explain how 'la Rolanderie' expanded so rapidly. Meyer seems to have made an arrangement with the Federal government, Humphrey informs us, whereby 'la Rolanderie' received 2 acres (0.81 ha) of land for every settler he established. But if his complaint that this did not cover postage and printing costs is credible, then we must seek other explanations. It is possible that he preempted some land. This was made possible by the privilege of preemption insert in the Dominion Lands Act of 1872. Under this legislation, a settler could secure an interim entry on a quarter-section adjoining his home quarter-section. Once he had paid a ten-dollar fee for his home quarter-section, established himself and lived there for five years, and secured the necessary title, he could purchase the adjoining quarter at a price set by the government. This might explain how Meyer obtained at least one of the quarters on his home-section. The most reasonable explanation accounting for 'la Rolanderie' expansion is that Meyer used some of Bonn's capital to buy CPR land. According to Professor Ted Regehr of the University of Saskatchewan, CPR land then was going for $1.00 or $1.25 an acre.^{[D]} The CPR owned all the odd numbered sections in the two townships, with the exception of sections eleven and twenty-nine (in both townships), which were allocated as school lands. Most of the Rolanderie holdings were on CPR reserves: in Township 14,1 all of sections 31, 33, and 35; and in Township 15, all of 3 and 9 and the south of 5. Meyer probably purchased the remaining land, the east half of 3 in Township 14, from James Watson, who had homesteaded one quarter and preempted the other quarter.

== Recruiting immigrants ==
Meyer was well aware of the needs of the new farmers in the Rolanderie district. In a letter to one prospective settler he wrote: "..Whoever on his arrival does not possess at least 3,000 francs (600 dollars), has not at his disposal two (male) good labouring hands in his family, is not a farmer, harness-maker, mason or blacksmith should not come hither!" Otherwise the settler would be almost solely dependent on the goodwill of his neighbours. In his letters to Ottawa Meyer repeatedly reminded the Federal government that the new settlers were extremely poor, and that they needed more than farmland in order to begin farming.^{[C]} He was quite critical of land speculators, at least insofar as their activities adversely affected the interests of those predominantly French-speaking Catholic immigrants whom he sponsored. In one letter he complained about certain 'capitalists' who were acquiring vast tracts of land. They fulfilled the government requirements by building small houses which they did not live in, and by seeding small crops which they did not harvest. They meanwhile bought up the best tracts of land, leaving the less desirable tracts for those settlers more dedicated to living on and developing their homesteads. He also felt that the Moosomin detachment of the Royal Canadian Mounted Police, which then was responsible for supervising the area, should provide more police protection. The widely scattered farms, he believed, left the farmer defenceless in the face of an Indian attack. Perhaps 1885 stuck out in his mind, when the countryside around the Pipestone had been almost completely deserted. In the spring of that year, Louis Riel had sent 'runners' from Batoche to Moose Mountain to incite the tribes to revolt. Meyer moreover accused the Indians of stealing settlers' horses and setting prairie fires. The consequence of inaction on these matters, the doctor warned, was that the prospective settler would return to Europe or move to the US, where homesteads were distributed free of charge.

It is possible that a third individual Count Yves de Roffignac (later Marquis de Roffignac), accompanied Meyer to the Pipestone. Father Fallourd states that these two men travelled together from France, and that they intended to enter into a partnership in order to establish a settlement. The author has reason to believe though that de Rofflgnac may have come later. In the 1891 issue of The Colonist, cited above, it is mentioned, "Some four years ago Baron de Brabant and family and Court de Roffignac located in close proximity to the ever running Pipestone." De Roffignac's name moreover is not recorded on the 1888 enumerator's list, while Meyer's name is included. The list was compiled prior to the 1888 Legislative Assembly (NWT) election; and a copy of the list was in the possession of Bill Mcintosh of Whitewood. De Roffignac's name is added to the list only for the 1891 election. Perhaps—contrary to what has been accepted up till now—de Roffignac was not the first aristocrat to settle in the area. If this is the case, then Count Jean de Jumilhac (later Marquis de Richelieu) of the Dutchy of Richelieu, a member of the prestigious family of Richelieu, Count Henri de Saurras, mentioned above, and Count de Wolfe, of the famed house of Pleyel and Wolfe piano manufacturers), were the first French Counts of St. Hubert. Joe Sage believes that they probably arrived in 1884 or 1885, and that de Jumilhac—and not de Roffignac, as is commonly accepted—constructed 'Bellevue'. The Chateau, no longer standing, was located high on a promontory on the north side of the Valley, on the South West Tsp 3 - Rge 15 - West of the 3rd. It was situated on a spot one-quarter of a mile west of the stone cairn (erected in 1940), which still stands near the turn in St. Hubert road as it descends into the Valley. Some time later, de Jumilhac joined de Saurras at the 'Chateau Richelieu', which is no longer standing, and de Roffignac moved into 'Bellevue'. De Saurras, who may have accompanied de Jumilhac to Canada, constructed the Chateau at NE Tsp 24 - Rge 14 - W3.

== la Rolanderie enterprises ==
The two counts remained there until 1888 and de Saurras managed the farm. In 1888 they moved to Kalenterin ranch, which was located southeast of Kennedy near Kenosee Lake (then known as 'Fish Lake'). The remaining party of aristocrats probably arrived between 1887 and 1891. The Baron van Brabant and his brother, both of Belgium, arrived in May 1887. The baron homesteaded the quarter beside Richelieu, NW Tsp 19 - Rge 14 - W Second Principal Meridian, and lived in a house he built there until 1888. In that year he moved into Richelieu, replacing de Saunas as manager of the Richelieu farm. Viscount Joseph de Langle, of Alençon (Orne), France and Monsieur Farquet arrived sometime before 1889. There is a record of their involvement in 1889 with de Roffignac in a horse-raising enterprise. De Langle homesteaded on the south half of Tsp 16 - Rge 14 - W 2. Count de Beaulincourt also arrived sometime before 1889. It is mentioned in the Golden Jubilee Edition of The Whitewood Herald (May 19, 1955, p. 7) that church services occasionally were held in his home in Whitewood, until the St. Joseph's Roman Catholic Church was built in 1889. Monsieur Emile Janet of Ay (Marne), France and Viscount Alphonse de Seyssel, of Songieu, France arrived in the spring of 1890. De Seyssel homesteaded on Tsp 13 - Rge 15 - W3. The quarter-section apparently went back to homestead, and his house, constructed of brick, is no longer standing because it fell down. Little is known of Count de Quercize. Possibly the last aristocrat to arrive in the district was Count Paul de Beaudrap, a cousin of de Roffignac's wife. He arrived in 1891, and after working for de Roffignac for a year homesteaded on SW Tsp 34 - Rge 14 - W 3.

== Establishing a Catholic mission ==
The Catholic parish of St. Hubert was established shortly after the arrival of most of the aristocrats. It in fact owes its origin, and its subsequent development as a French-speaking Catholic community, to two of these aristocrats. According to The Colonist, by 1889 de Roffignac and the Baron van Brabant "conceived the idea of establishing a French colony". Joe Sage informed the author that a meeting was held on the spot of the first church, near the stone cairn mentioned above. Five people attended the meeting, including Monsignor Langevin, who was Archbishop of St. Boniface (his diocese included almost all the present-day Manitoba and Saskatchewan), probably de Roffignac and van Brabant, and two priests. Mr. Sage believes that one priest was an assistant to the Archbishop, and that the other was Father Nayrolles, who had intermittently served mass in the district prior to 1890, and who would become the St. Hubert parish's second resident priest. The Archbishop accepted at the meeting that the Catholic community in the district was large enough to warrant the building of a church and the establishment of a resident parish priest. Later in the year, Father Fallourd tells us, On April 5, 1890, Rev. Father Leon Muller, a priest from the Diocese of Paris arrived at Whitewood for the mission south of there. He had been exercising the sacred functions at Fannystelle, Manitoba, during the year 1889. After residing here only a few months as guest of Count de Roffignac at the Rolanderie, the construction of a stone church was completed and in the month of August of the same year he was back in Paris working for the colonization of St. Hubert. "The funds for the construction of the church," Fallourd wrote, "were supplied exclusively by members of the French nobility and other French-speaking Catholics." He observes that this is "One of the chief originality (sic) of the parish." The new parish was christened 'St. Hubert'. There are differing opinions as to how the founders of the Church arrived at this name. While Fr. Fallourd mentions that it was named after Saint Hubert, the patron saint of the hunt, Mr. Edmund Dunand, recalls that it was named after de Seyssel's son, Hubert.

According to Bill Barry, the colony's patron, Meyer had an estate La Rolanderie near Saint-Hubert, Belgium.

At the meeting referred to above, the five men also agreed that immigrants of Catholic and French origin should be encouraged to settle in the Rolanderie area. They decided that the best way to ensure the subsequent development of the St. Hubert district as a French-speaking Catholic community was to regulate the sale of homesteads. Similar colonial settlement reservations had been made in 1874 for French Canadians repatriated from the New England states, and had given rise to the establishment between 1876 and 1885 of ten new French settlements in Western Canada. Following this meeting the two aristocrats purchased fourteen quarters south of the Pipestone in Township fourteen (all of sections 31, 33 and 35 and all the east half of section 34) and fourteen quarters north of the. valley (all of sections 2 and 9, the north halves of sections 4 and 5, and the south half of section 3). This land in turn was sold to the Diocese of St. Boniface at or near cost. Once having secured the land, the January 1891 issue of The colonist tells us, de Roffignac and Van Brabant induced a number of French families "to transport themselves across the Atlantic and locate within the limits of the settlement." They promised their compatriots "free and comfortable homes, liberty and remunerative employment," and one homestead quarter for each family-head. Partially with the business of recruiting settlers in mind, de Roffignac had returned to France in 1889. Van Brabant spent the winter of 1891 in France "attending to immigration business in connection with the colony." The colony soon enjoyed a large measure of success. According to Father Fallourd, eighty-eight French and Belgians arrived at Rolanderie between March 26, 1892 and October 4, 1893.

De Roffignac's and van Brabant's plans to establish the settlement as a French-speaking Catholic community dovetailed nicely with the plans of the aristocrats to develop the area into an agricultural-industrial centre. As The colonist explained: "The general objective of the promoters (of colonization) was to enter largely into the cultivation of chicory and sugar beet and the raising of horses, cattle and sheep." By working in these and other enterprises, the new settlers could earn enough money to establish themselves on their homesteads. They moreover had a place to stay, usually in the small houses built on or near the main farm yards at Rolanderie, Richelieu, and the others. The presence of the new settlers would solve a recurring problem that the Counts had had to deal with. While the Counts had brought with them from France several gardeners, servants, farm labourers, lease tenants, they still were in need of large manpower reserves. One enterprise they established in 1891 (the gruyere cheese factory), for example, would employ fifteen men in the winter and more than fifteen in the summer.

== Labour shortages ==
When the French-speaking Belgian and French settler-labourers in the area were not sufficiently numerous, as was the case at Meyer's 'in Rolanderie', de Roffignac's Bellevue, and de Jumilhac's and de Saurras' Kalenterin ranch, the aristocrats had to employ settlers of other nationalities. Fr. Fallourd described the problems that this solution posed: "This personnel, composed of French, English, German, Swede, etc., could not talk to each other except by signs — "a real Tower of Babel," as described later by Mr. Renoult." Indians also were employed. The Colonist indicates: "During the pulling season this year (at Bellevue, 1890) assistance was so scarce that a number of Indians were employed and paid in proportion to the work performed." With a large community of French-speaking Catholics settled in the district, the nobles could count on a lingually uniform and readily available pool of labourers to man their various enterprises. The community of new immigrants moreover would provide a market for the products produced in the Counts factories.

== Old country conflicts ==
De Roffignac and van Brabant, and most of the other aristocrats on the Pipestone with the exception of de Beaudrap and perhaps de Seyssel, had access to large reserves of capital. De Roffignac in 1889 had been ruined financially by a horse-raising venture he had undertaken with de Langle and M. Farquet. The venture had resulted in a lawsuit in France and had seen de Langle capture control of the herd of horses and Farquet not return to Canada. But by 1890 de Roffignac had been financially reinvigorated by his marriage to Germaine de Salving, daughter of Count de Bosieu, and by his appointment as manager at 'la Rolanderie'. The Societé had sold the ranch to a group of French investors, who had formed the 'Rolanderie Stock Raising Society' and replaced Meyer by the Count. De Roffignac and the other nobles sought to benefit from the opportunities on the underdeveloped prairie by investing in novel agricultural and industrial experiments. Certainly cash was not in plentiful supply, but they probably hoped to circumvent this problem by reaching specialized markets, both in the area and in other parts of Canada. Mr. W. H. James, one of the farmers who grew chicory for the chicory factory, tells us that they even were prepared to "build a narrow gauge railway from Whitewood to the factories before the business folded up," presumably to reach the more distant markets.

== Chicory production ==
The Counts optimistic view of the opportunities on the prairie underlay the flourish of agricultural and industrial activity on the Pipestone and at the Kalenterin ranch after 1888. Before his departure for France in 1889, de Roffignac had formed a partnership with van Brabant. The purpose of this association was to "(grow) and Manufacture this indispensable article (chicory) under the firm style of the 'Bellevue French Coffee Company' (Colonist)". In their enthusiasm they produced enough coffee in the first year of operation to market to continental America for the next twenty years. Chicory was an additive, used in France and England, that greatly improved on the texture and taste of coffee. The two entrepreneurs imported seed and equipment from Europe, converted the Bellevue farm over to the production of the chicory crop, and set up drying and manufacturing plants in the Bellevue yard. To encourage farmers in the area to grow chicory, they distributed packages of seeds. The chicory factory burned down in the winter of 1890–91, and the van Brabants moved their operation over to Richelieu. The "Richelieu Coffee Brand", placed on the market in 1892 and 1893, was no more successful than the "Bellevue" brand. When the Richelieu operation burned down, Renoult and de Beaudrap, who supplied the capital, assumed control of the chicory factory. Instead of blending the powder with coffee, they sold it as an additive. The two men operated the chicory factory until de Beaudrap's departure for France in 1899, and the Count later claimed that the venture yielded him a small profit.

== Innovation and experimentation in local agriculture ==
Dr Roffignac and van Brabant sought in 1890 to establish a second industry. In 1886 Meyer had grown a splendid crop of sugar-beets; and had sought to convince the Department of Agriculture to investigate the possibilities of this crop for in the N.W.T. He even had offered to set up the Rolanderie ranch as an experimental farm. While Ottawa seems to have paid little attention to Meyer's proposal, the two aristocrats gave the idea serious consideration. Roffignac was able to raise the initial start up cost of $500,000. The late Mrs. L.W.D. Park, whose father James Grierson of Whitewood constructed the Rolanderie and Bellevue chateaus, wrote in an article in The Whitewood Herald (1950) As sugar was expensive and much in demand on prairies, it was thought that by cultivating the beet the farmers could produce a commodity which would rival wheat production in that it would give richer returns per acre. To ensure that the soil and climatic conditions were suitable, Mrs. Park recalls, "tests of selected sugar beets had been made under the supervision of an expert from Brazil and apparently had proved satisfactory." De Roffignac, shortly after his return from France in 1890, and van Brabant organized a meeting of settlers in Whitewood. Their proposals are said to have been accepted. The farmers not only appreciated the sugar-beets conceivably were a more profitable cash crop than wheat, they recognized the vegetable was better suited to the climate of the region. Frost neither retarded the growth of the plant nor injured its quality. The same could not be said of the Red Fife wheat they were currently growing. The two nobles distributed the seed to the farmers, and the first crop was grown in 1890. To the aristocrat s dismay the territorial government refused to allow the production of the beets because the process yielded an alcoholic by-product. Regina was attempting at the time to keep it out of the hands of the Indians. It would allow settlers to have liquor in their possession only if they held a "permit" from the Lieutenant-Governor of the N.W.T. Thus ended what to be the most successful of all the enterprises initiated on the Pipestone.

Bellevue and Richelieu were not the only centres of activity. By 1892 the Gruyere cheese factory ned to above was established on Tsp 16 - Rge 15 - West of the 3rd, on now (1980) owned by Andre Dartige. Janet and de Seyssel had arrived in 1890 with the express of establishing such a factory. After surveying the land and gauging the possibilities of such an enterprise, they returned to France in the fall of 1890 to purchase equipment and recruit skilled labourers. Janet arrived back on the Pipestone in the spring of 1891, and de Seyssel in the following year. Within a year their hopes had been dashed. Disregarding the advice of Mr. F. Dunand, a specialist in cheese production who had accompanied them back to Canada, they built the factory, installed the machinery, and purchased a large herd of cattle. Dunand later declared, "I made cheese in the old country and I knew that a certain kind of milk was necessary to make the Gruyere cheese." If the two entrepreneurs would have tested the soil, they would have learned that it was too alkaline. Cattle, fed on grass grown on this soil, produced milk that would not cure and age properly. Other enterprises initiated by the Counts were similarly unsuccessful. The brush-making factory was closed: and the Kalenterin sheep-ranching and wool enterprise, established in 1888 by de Jumilliac, de Saurras, and de Wolfe, ended shortly after it began. It seems that the markets for wool and mutton were too small to support such a large operation. Control of the fifteen hundred sheep herd was assumed by de Saurras.

== Devolution of the community of French nobles ==
As each enterprise was discontinued, its director(s) closed his chateau and left the area. The first chateau to be closed in 1889 was Richelieu. Sometime after 1889, following the disassociation of de Jumilhac, de Saurras and de Wolfe, de Jumilhac and possibly de Wolfe left for the Yukon gold fields. De Saurras probably left after 1891, when Kalenterin ranch was closed. De Jangle, who was involved in the horse-raising enterprise with de Roffignac and Farquet, had settled in Whitewood probably in 1888. He opened a general store, and remained in the town until around 1913. The last of the big chateaus to be closed was 'la Rolanderie'. De Roffignac probably shut the doors in 1893 or 1894, and left for parts unknown. De Beaudrap ended the chicory operation in 1899, and returned to France "for family reasons." As for the other aristocrats, it is not known exactly when they left the district. Before the Counts departed, they auctioned off their machinery and many of their household effects at exceedingly low prices. They also sold their land. Alexander Jeannot, for example, purchased the Richelieu homestead, and Dave Kolman the Rolanderie homestead. Whatever land the Counts could not sell to the settlers, they sold to the Diocese of St. Boniface.

One of the St.-Hubert colonists wrote to the colony's patron; "everlasting curse for your deceit and treason against me. Bloody revenge will be sure."

The Counts generally are viewed as not succeeding in their various endeavours because their lifestyles were too extravagant, and because they lacked business acumen. Their expensively run households, their livery coaches, their hunts and races at Moosomin and Cannington Manor, and their gay social life indeed were extravagant, according to the standards of the pioneers who settled alongside them. One meal's menu served by a Count dished up a pig stuffed with a whole goose which was itself filled with epicurean dressing along with a complement of oysters. Annually the Counts booked the Whitewood Commercial Hotel for the Frenchman's Ball. "Many pretty dresses of the style of the late eighties were in evidence, souvenirs perhaps of better days across the sea. The vivacious Frenchwomen of gentle birth and breeding in fashionable décolleté gowns and jeweled neck and arms lent an air of distinction in spite of the incongruity of the crude setting." But we have no way of knowing whether these activities were extravagant by their standards, since we do not have access to their account ledgers. As for the claim that they lacked "business knowledge this does them an injustice. The only outstanding business failures were the Gruyere cheese enterprise, the Kalenterin term ranch sheep-raising project, and perhaps de Roffignac-Farquet de Langle horse-raising venture. The chicory enterprise under de Beaudrap a 'success story', even if it did take two fires and two moves before the enterprise started yielding a small profit. Another 'success story' might well have been the beet-root project, had de Roffignac and van Brabant been more politically adept. Undoubtedly, the Counts did sink a large amount of money into the St. Hubert colony. The fact that some had to borrow money to return to France indicates that they reaped far from a high return on their investment. Possibly, though, some of them left because they were conquered by the prairie. Life in the Canadian West did not meet their expectations, and they refused to compromise. Westerners, both in Canada and in the United States, were wrestling through the 1880s and 1890s with the thorny problem of developing farming techniques suited to the dry climate and short growing-season of the central plains. The agricultural field was open to experimentation, and the Counts met the challenge in a highly innovative manner.

== The lasting contribution of the French Counts to the social fabric of Saskatchewan ==
The Counts left behind them much more than stories of their various enterprises, of their annual balls in the Whitewood Town Hall and of their participation in the Whitewood town band. In addition to directing a large influx of French-speaking Catholics into the area, they left behind a well-endowed parish Church. The twenty-eight quarter-sections sold to the Diocese of St. Boniface by de Roffignac and van Brabant, and the land sold to the Diocese prior to the Counts departure from the district, were in turn sold by the Diocese to the French congregation of priests known as the 'Sons of Mary Immaculate'. This congregation established St. Hubert and Whitewood as a mission in 1903. According to Mrs. Bernadette (Emile) Gatin of Whitewood, the first superior of St. Hubert, Fr. Boutin (Mrs. Gatin's uncle) negotiated the deal with Archbishop Langevin. On April 20, 1904 it is known that all the land purchased for the Diocese in Township fourteen was still in the possession of the congregation. Most of this land would be sold to parishioners by 1911. As for the land in Township fifteen, no record of its sale is available to the author. Possibly it was sold by the Diocese to immigrants arriving in the area after 1890. The strong role played by the Church in guiding the development of the colony reflects the special role 'the Counts' played when St. Hubert was being established. They not only gave the settlement an added stimulus to its growth, by establishing their various enterprises and encouraging immigration into the area, they helped to place the Church in the central position of authority in the community. This denotes the "chief originality" of the settlement.

If the aristocrats were not chased away by raging prairie fires or blizzards, then they left at the outbreak of the first World War to serve.

Many of the labourers and supporting entourage stayed in the settlement such as house servants, coachmen, artisans, gardeners, horse groomsmen, and tenant farmers. These were joined by other settlers from Belgium and France as well as Fannystelle, Manitoba. Fannystelle was settled south of Winnipeg by Countess Marthe d'Albuféra.

The neighbouring town of Dumas was also a French ethnic bloc settlement. Another Franco-Belgian settlement was started in the area of Montmartre by the Société Foncière du Canada.

St. Hubert was featured on an episode of the 10) Knights of the Dark (Season 1 Episode 10) an entertainment show that purports to investigate paranormal events in locations around Saskatchewan.

== Ste-Jeanne d'Arc convent school ==
The Ste-Jeanne d'Arc convent school was in use for four years beginning in 1920, but was soon converted to the Joan of Arc nursing home which was in use until 1967.

== Golden Plain ==
Golen Plain post office was established in 1900 at Sec.22, Twp.14, R.3, W2, and changed its name to St. Hubert Mission on July 1, 1915. The name Golden Plain still heralded the district, however at Sec.4, Twp.14, R.3, W2 when the name was changed to St. Hubert Mission at the northern location. The Golden Plain Protestant Public School District #70 also served the area for four years after being established in 1886.

== Restoration ==
During Whitewood's centennial year of 1992, they collaborated on the history of the French Counts. The Merchant Bank Heritage Centre soon followed which also celebrates the French Count history and displays the welcoming sign, "The Most Romantic Settlement in the West". In the fall of 2002, economic development director Janet Blackstock along with Mayor Malcolm Green aimed at the restoration of the homes built in the late 1800s by the French aristocrats and paint outside murals in Whitewood to re-vitalize the local history. One mural had been painted in 2000 showing the town in 1890. The area of Whitewood claims that during the late nineteenth century, there were more aristocrats here than anywhere else in North America.

== See also ==
- List of communities in Saskatchewan
- Cannington Manor Provincial Park

== Notes ==
^{A} Winnipeg, Manitoba: Established 1738 as Fort Rouge; renamed 1822 Fort Garry; incorporated in 1873 as the city of Winnipeg.
^{B} $20,000.00 in 1889 is equivalent to $716,670, in present day terms.
^{C} $3,000.00 in 1889 is equivalent to $107,500, in present day terms.
^{D} $1.00 in 1872 is equivalent to $30.00, in present day terms.

== Citations ==
- Smeets, L. (1980) Memories of St Hubert Whitewood Herald
- Sullivan, K. (2009), The French Counts of St Hubert The French Counts of St. Hubert: Local History as Social Commentary
