= New Finland =

District in Saskatchewan, Canada

New Finland District Uusi Suomi
- District
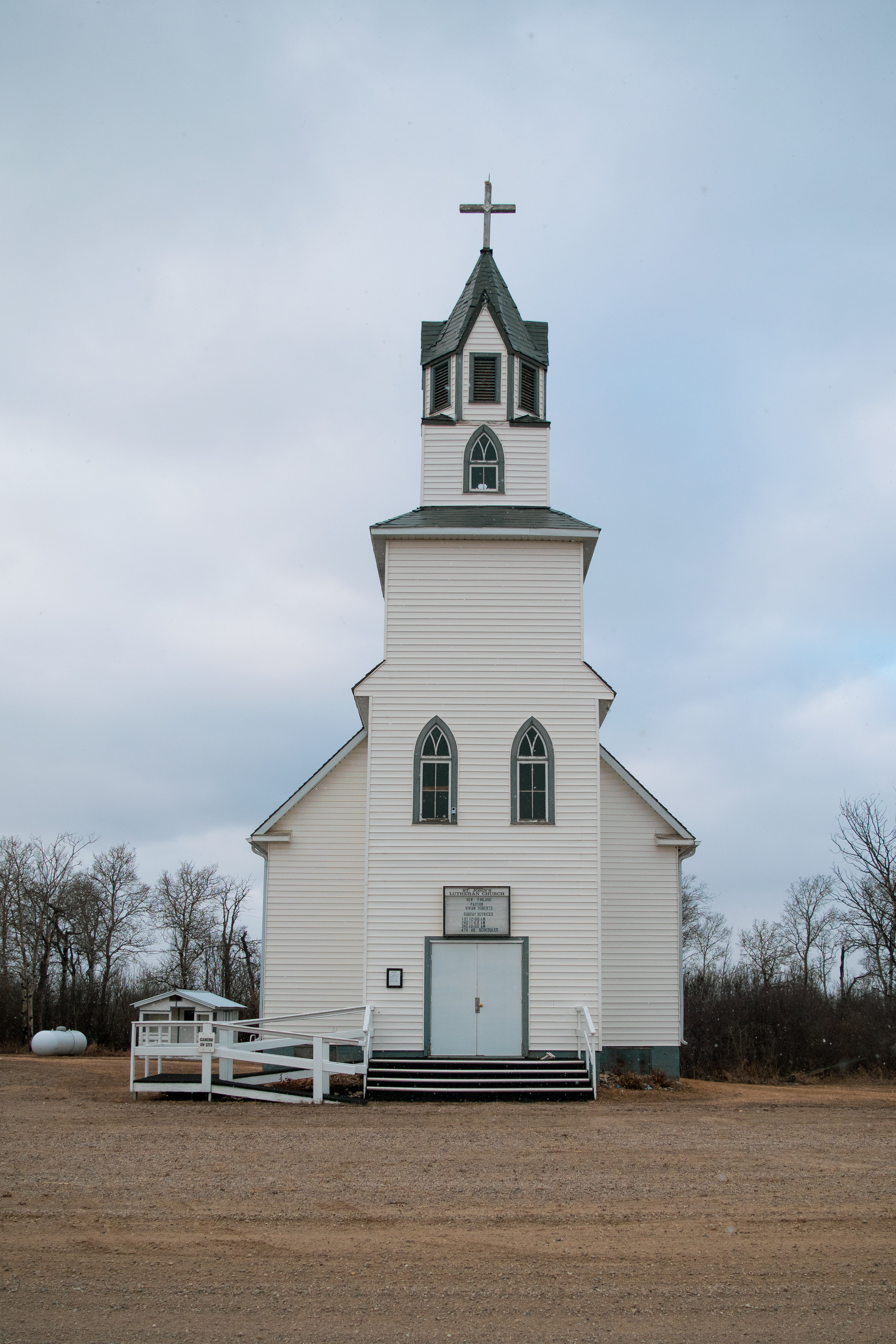

- Location in Saskatchewan New Finland District (Canada)
- Coordinates: 50°25′34″N 102°12′45″W
- Country: Canada
- Province: Saskatchewan
- Within Rural municipality: Willowdale No. 153
- Provincial electoral district: Constituency of Moosomin
- Federal electoral district: Riding of Souris—Moose Mountain
- Uusi Suomi: 1888
- New Finland Post office established: 1 August 1896

Government
  - Type: Council–manager government within a Parliamentary system
  - Reeve: Ernest Briggs
  - Administrator: Doreen Jurkovic
  - Member of the Legislative Assembly or MLA: Speaker Don Toth
  - Member of Parliament of MP: Ed Komarnicki

Population (2006)
  - Total: 333
- Time zone: UTC-6 (UTC)
- Area code: 306
- Website: rootsweb.ancestry.com/finnish

New Finland or Uusi Suomi is a district in the Qu'Appelle valley, the south eastern part of the province of Saskatchewan, Canada.

Uusi Suomi is Finnish for "New Finland", the name adopted by this Finnish block settlement. The homesteaders found an area in Saskatchewan near Qu'Appelle River which resembled the homeland of Finland both in geography and climate. The earliest settler arrived in 1888, and was followed by Finnish immigrants from Finland as well as from the iron ore mine regions of Minnesota and Dakota in the United States. The centre of the New Finland district consisted of a church, hall, and schoolhouse. Finland was undergoing profound changes following Tsar Nicholas II's February manifesto which was a main factor initiating the Great Exodus from Finland. The Canadian Pacific Railway along with Canadian immigration minister Clifford Sifton were advertising both abroad and in the United States encouraging settlement to Canada's "Last Best West". The community which arose had strong religious beliefs and celebrated Finnish cultural traditions.

== History ==
David Jeremia Kautonen was the first Finnish settler to arrive at the New Finland district in 1888, setting up a homestead on southwest quarter section of township 36 range 17 west of the second Meridian. According to C. D. Hendrickson, immigration agent for the Canadian Pacific Railway, there were only three families living in the New Finland District in the spring of 1891. The nearby town of Whitewood, Provisional District of Assiniboia, North-West Territories was a major stop on the C.P.R. In 1900, Kautonen was joined by John Lauttamus and Matti Mutamaa. The C.P.R. immigration department then encouraged Finnish settlers of the Minnesota and Dakota region in the United States to emigrate to Canada. With this in mind, delegates from the American Finnish districts travelled to New Finland, North-West Territories and were well pleased with what they had surveyed. As a result, several Finnish settlers of the United States abandoned their employment in the iron ore mines and immigrated to the New Finland District.

The three families who originally came to the area wrote letters back to friends and family still residing in Finland, describing the settlement and urging them to come to Canada. Soon the New Finland district had swollen to 50 people. A letter to the Dominion of Canada Minister of the Interior was written February 15, 1900, by Samuel Kivela and Thomas Karppinen clergyman requesting information about settlement prospects in Canada. This letter was in response to articles placed in the Finnish newspapers by the United States who wished to discourage settlement in Canada. The Canadian Department of the Interior responded promptly, and advised that the Finnish newspapers would soon have reports directly from agents from Finland who had travelled from Finland to inspect Canada first hand. Many of these new immigrants were "Church Finns" with strong religious beliefs. By 1893 they had established their religious institution, the St. John Suomi (Finnish) Lutheran Synod; in 1907 they built their church. By 1899, a Finnish consul found the population close to 250 persons. The community had erected both a church and two schools, New Finland School District 435 in 1896 and Nurmi Oja SD #1416 in 1906. In 2010, around 200 people identify themselves as part of the New Finland district.

== Immigration ==
The years between 1870 and 1930 are sometimes referred as 'the Great Migration' of Finns into North America. There are several factors which resulted in immigration of Finns to Saskatchewan. Push factors refer primarily to the motive for emigration from the country of origin, which usually involves its history. The "February manifesto" of Tzar Nicholas II in 1899 merged the army of Finland with that of Russia which resulted in mandatory army training. Other cultural freedoms were being usurped during this time which violated the constitution of Finland.

Pull factors towards Canada were largely of extensive advertisements done by the Canadian Pacific Railway (CPR). The CPR was undertaking the transcontinental railway, and was looking at settling the Prairie Provinces, rather than running a rail line through a barren plain. All lands east of the provisional districts of Saskatchewan and Assiniboia were taken. Immigration Minister Clifford Sifton adopted the motto, "The Last Best West" and supported immigration by passing The Dominion Lands Act offering a free quarter section for a $10 registration fee. Applicants just had to prove up the land with a three-year residence. Enticing immigrants to Canada offset low internal migration, and developed its natural resources. Immigration agents targeted continental European farmers who would make stable and lifetime settlers as grain farmers in the western frontier.

Economic migration and labour migration show a profound difference in wage rates. As J. K. Lauttamus sums it up, in 1890, he arrived in New Finland with $15.00 CAN in his pocket. He worked his land from sun up to sun down and, by 1899, he had $1,600, a home, stables, horses, cattle, land, and agricultural implements. He was very happy in the new land and could not even imagine where in Finland he would have been able acquire such possessions.

$15.00 would be around $230 in today's market, and $1,600 would be equivalent to about $40,000 after inflation.

One consequence of immigration was the change in surname. The lengthy, hard to pronounce and hard to spell, Finnish names did not serve well in English dealings. Kurkimäki was often shortened to Mäki, Ahonen to Aho, and Saarinen to Saari.

== Demographics ==
The population of the New Finland district was enumerated as a portion of the Rural Municipality of Willowdale No. 153.

Canada census – RM of Willowdale No. 153 community profile

Population
Land area
Population density
Median age
Private dwellings
Median household income

== Geography ==
New Finland is a district in the Qu'Appelle valley, the south eastern part of the province of Saskatchewan. Uusi Suomi is Finnish for New Finland, the name adopted by this Finnish block settlement. The district is 20 kilometres (12 mi) north Wapella. It is northwest of Whitewood, and south of Yorkton. The Manitoba border is located just 64 kilometres (40 mi) to the east. Esterhazy, New Stockholm, and Tantallon are other neighbouring settlements. The district is located in the Rural Municipality of Willowdale No. 153. The Dominion Land Survey description of New Finland District's location are sections within Township (Tsp) 16, 17, 18 at Ranges 32, 33 West of the First meridian and sections within Tsp 16, 17, 18 within Ranges (Rge) 1,2 West of the Second Meridian. The centre of the district consisting of church, hall, and schoolhouse was Section 36 Tsp 17, Rge 1 West of the 2nd Meridian. New Finland is located in the north eastern section of the topographical area named Wood Hills to the north of Moose Mountain and south of the Qu'Appelle River. New Finland is situated in the Melville Plain of the Aspen Parkland ecoregion.

== Economy ==
The Finnish settlers found an area which was still wooded and had historically escaped the many grass fires which blanketed the great plains. The homesteaders found an area which resembled their homeland both in geography and climate. Qu'Appelle River and Round Lake were nearby water areas, for a community used to a land of lakes. Suomi translates to "the people and the land of the marshes". They were able to bring many of the farming customs of Finland to the new country. They ploughed the land with oxen, harvested with scythes, and threshed it with flails. The Finns were also excellent cattlemen. For sustenance, fish was plentiful from the streams and rivers as were various species of wild game. Many settlers would add an extra room to the sauna to keep the chickens warm through the cool winter months. The families were self-sufficient on the land, trapping, hunting, completing garments of skins and hides, picking berries, canning, and baking. Settlers would travel into town, a trip which took 24 hours by horse, selling logs for any additional provisions they may need. In the early 1900s the community saw a store, blacksmith, sawmill, grist mill, and shingle making enterprises spring up. The Clayridge post office was part of the New Finland district.

== Climate ==
New Finland has a humid continental climate, with extreme seasonal temperatures. It has warm summers and cold winters, with the average daily temperatures ranging from −16.5 °C (2.3 °F) in January to 18.2 °C (64.8 °F) in July. Annually, temperatures exceed 30 °C (86 °F) on an average in late July. Typically, summer lasts from late June until late August, and the humidity is seldom uncomfortably high. Winter lasts from November to March, and varies greatly in length and severity. Spring and autumn are both short and highly variable. On July 5, 1937, an extreme high of 41.1 °C (106.0 °F) was recorded, and on January 12, 1916, a record low of −45.6 °C (−50.1 °F).

Climate data for Whitewood, a nearby community
Month	Jan	Feb	Mar	Apr	May	Jun	Jul	Aug	Sep	Oct	Nov	Dec	Year
Record high °C (°F)	9.5 (49.1)	12.2 (54.0)	20.6 (69.1)	32.2 (90.0)	37.8 (100.0)	40.6 (105.1)	41.1 (106.0)	38 (100)	36.7 (98.1)	29.5 (85.1)	22.5 (72.5)	13 (55)	41.1 (106.0)
Mean daily maximum °C (°F)	−11 (12)	−7.1 (19.2)	−0.9 (30.4)	9.4 (48.9)	17.6 (63.7)	22 (72)	24.7 (76.5)	23.7 (74.7)	17.5 (63.5)	10.3 (50.5)	−1.2 (29.8)	−8.6 (16.5)	8 (46)
Daily mean °C (°F)	−16.5 (2.3)	−12.3 (9.9)	−6.1 (21.0)	3.5 (38.3)	11 (52)	15.6 (60.1)	18.2 (64.8)	16.9 (62.4)	11.2 (52.2)	4.6 (40.3)	−5.7 (21.7)	−13.5 (7.7)	2.3 (36.1)
Mean daily minimum °C (°F)	−21.9 (−7.4)	−17.4 (0.7)	−11.1 (12.0)	−2.4 (27.7)	4.4 (39.9)	9.3 (48.7)	11.6 (52.9)	10.1 (50.2)	4.9 (40.8)	−1.2 (29.8)	−10.3 (13.5)	−18.4 (−1.1)	−3.5 (25.7)
Record low °C (°F)	−45.6 (−50.1)	−44.4 (−47.9)	−44.4 (−47.9)	−27.8 (−18.0)	−13 (9)	−4.4 (24.1)	0 (32)	−3 (27)	−12.8 (9.0)	−25.6 (−14.1)	−37 (−35)	−41 (−42)	−45.6 (−50.1)
Average precipitation mm (inches)	26 (1.0)	19.5 (0.77)	29.1 (1.15)	26.8 (1.06)	55 (2.2)	80.8 (3.18)	72.3 (2.85)	68.9 (2.71)	51.8 (2.04)	28.3 (1.11)	21.4 (0.84)	26.8 (1.06)	506.6 (19.94)
Source: Environment Canada

== Education ==
Education was provided firstly in two one-room school houses, and in a few years, six schoolhouses served the district and then ten. New Finland, Nurmi Oja, and Convent Creek were geographically situated within the district. Many of the students spoke the Finnish language, and needed to be instructed to learn English.

The settlers assembled October 26, 1896, to construct New Finland School District 435. The ten schools serving pupils of the district were: Carnoustie SD #309 (1895–1959), Deerwood SD #465 (1898–1962), Forest Farm SD #90 (1889–1957), Grove Park SD #518 (1899–1966), Woodleigh SD #1023 (1905–1959), Hopehill SD #1519 (1906–1965), Nurmi Oja SD #1416 (1906–1958). And again in November 1925, the community assembled to arrange for the construction of Convent Creek 4640 which was operational between 1926 and 1961, followed by Elliott SD #4742 (1928–1962), and Cranbrook SD #4753 (1937–1963).

After these one room school houses were closed, students would be bussed into the larger urban communities of Rocanville, Wapella, or Whitewood for their education.

== Arts and culture ==
The community established a lending library early in its pioneering days. "Suomalainen uskoo sanan voimaan" is a Finnish proverb which translated means that a Finn believes in the power of the word. The Finnish valued literacy and initiated the building of both school and library to encourage education.

Many pioneers after building their distinctive Finnish log houses with the square corner finishing architecture would erect a sauna, steam sauna or a savu, smoke sauna. Vihtas, or switches were employed to open up the pores. "Jos ei sauna ja viina ja terva auta niin se tauti on kuolemaksi"; "If sauna, liquor and tar salve won't make you well, death is imminent." The sauna was valued for cleanliness and became a weekly gathering with men bathing together, then women, then children.

Another custom which was adopted in the New Finland district was to establish a "temperance society" as was popular with many Finnish settlements. With the outlawing of alcohol, the community would prosper on the new frontier which presented challenges of its own without the problems of drunkenness.

The New Finland district does celebrate St. John's Day with their annual Juhannus — Celebration of Summer. As part of the festivities a traditional bonfire, kokko, may be lit. This picnic and community gathering is held on the Saturday nearest to June 24 each year. Two particularly large celebrations were in 1988, the communities' centennial year, and another 1993, the centennial year of the St. John's Finnish Synod Evangelical Lutheran Church. In this way descendants of the original Finnish homesteaders who remain in the New Finland district still retain some aspects of their Finnish ethno-cultural heritage. The hall built in the community supported regular, theatrical performances and sports events. Music was supplied by accordion and mouth organ.

== Points of interest ==
St. John's New Finland Lutheran Church, with an active congregation, was officially declared a municipal heritage property on May 4, 2007. The church building was built in 1907, and then the community moved it in 1934 by steam engine to the present location 8 kilometres (5 mi) south of the original construction site. This arduous undertaking necessitated sawing the church in half. The seam can still be seen where the church was rejoined. In 1993, a book, The Finns of New Finland 1888–1993, was published in recognition of its centennial, and in 2003, the Finns celebrated the church's 110 anniversary.

== See also ==
- List of communities in Saskatchewan
