= Rural Municipality of Silverwood No. 123 =

Rural municipality in Saskatchewan, Canada

Silverwood No. 123
- Rural municipality
- Rural Municipality of Silverwood No. 123
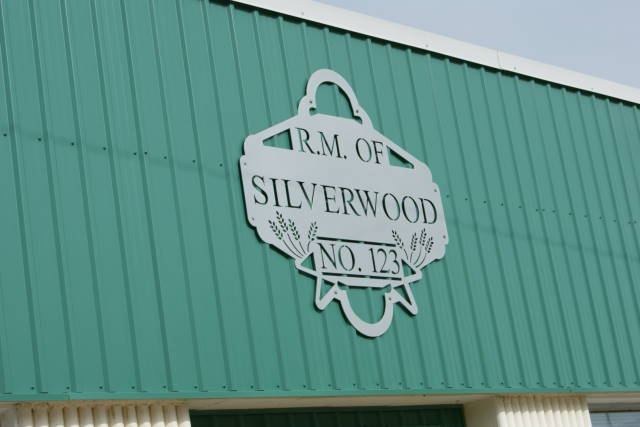
- RM's logo on its office building

- Location of the RM of Silverwood No. 123 in Saskatchewan
- Coordinates: 50.179°N 102.196°W
- Country: Canada
- Province: Saskatchewan
- Census division: 5
- SARM division: 1
- Federal riding: Souris—Moose Mountain
- Provincial riding: Moosomin
- Formed: October 31, 1911

Government
  - Reeve: William MacPherson
  - Governing body: RM of Silverwood No. 123 Council
  - Administrator: Jennalee Beutler
  - Office location: Whitewood

Area (2016)
  - Land: 844.61 km^{2} (326.11 sq mi)

Population (2016)
  - Total: 410
  - Density: 0.5/km^{2} (1.3/sq mi)
- Time zone: CST
  - Summer (DST): CST
- Area codes: 306 and 639
- Website: S0G 5C0

The Rural Municipality of Silverwood No. 123 (2016 population: 410) is a rural municipality (RM) in the Canadian province of Saskatchewan within Census Division No. 5 and SARM Division No. 1. It is located in the southeast portion of the province.

== History ==
The RM of Silverwood No. 123 incorporated as a rural municipality on October 31, 1911.

== Geography ==
The Great Blue Heron (Ardea herodias), a species of special concern, makes its home in this area.

=== Communities and localities ===
The following unincorporated communities are within the RM.

Localities

- Fairmede
- Langbank
- St. Hubert Mission

== Demographics ==
Population history (1981–2016)
Year	Pop.	±%
1981	806	—
1986	785	−2.6%
1991	639	−18.6%
1996	608	−4.9%
2001	511	−16.0%
2006	449	−12.1%
2011	466	+3.8%
2016	410	−12.0%
Source: Statistics Canada via Saskatchewan Bureau of Statistics

In the 2021 Census of Population conducted by Statistics Canada, the RM of Silverwood No. 123 had a population of 355 living in 132 of its 152 total private dwellings, a change of −13.4% from its 2016 population of 410. With a land area of 827.96 km^{2} (319.68 sq mi), it had a population density of 0.4/km^{2} (1.1/sq mi) in 2021.

In the 2016 Census of Population, the RM of Silverwood No. 123 recorded a population of 410 living in 158 of its 165 total private dwellings, a −12% change from its 2011 population of 466. With a land area of 844.61 km^{2} (326.11 sq mi), it had a population density of 0.5/km^{2} (1.3/sq mi) in 2016.

== Government ==
The RM of Silverwood No. 123 is governed by an elected municipal council and an appointed administrator that meets on the second Thursday of every month. The reeve of the RM is William MacPherson while its administrator is Jennalee Beutler. The RM's office is located in Whitewood.

== See also ==
- List of rural municipalities in Saskatchewan
