= Rural Municipality of Martin No. 122 =

Rural municipality in Saskatchewan, Canada

Martin No. 122
- Rural municipality
- Rural Municipality of Martin No. 122
- Location of the RM of Martin No. 122 in Saskatchewan
- Coordinates: 50.213°N 101.902°W
- Country: Canada
- Province: Saskatchewan
- Census division: 5
- SARM division: 1
- Formed: January 1, 1913

Government
  - Reeve: Gerald Flaman
  - Governing body: RM of Martin No. 122 Council
  - Administrator: Cheryl Barrett
  - Office location: Moosomin

Area (2016)
  - Land: 556.5 km^{2} (214.9 sq mi)

Population (2016)
  - Total: 289
  - Density: 0.5/km^{2} (1.3/sq mi)
- Time zone: CST
  - Summer (DST): CST
- Postal code: S0G 3N0
- Area codes: 306 and 639
- Website: Official website

The Rural Municipality of Martin No. 122 (2016 population: 289) is a rural municipality (RM) in the Canadian province of Saskatchewan within Census Division No. 5 and SARM Division No. 1. It is approximately 200 km (120 mi) east of Regina and bisected by the Trans-Canada Highway.

== History ==
The RM of Martin No. 122 incorporated as a rural municipality on January 1, 1913.

== Demographics ==
Population history (1981–2016)
Year	Pop.	±%
1981	548	—
1986	472	−13.9%
1991	387	−18.0%
1996	370	−4.4%
2001	339	−8.4%
2006	339	+0.0%
2011	333	−1.8%
2016	289	−13.2%
Source: Statistics Canada via Saskatchewan Bureau of Statistics

In the 2021 Census of Population conducted by Statistics Canada, the RM of Martin No. 122 had a population of 254 living in 101 of its 119 total private dwellings, a change of −12.1% from its 2016 population of 289. With a land area of 542.27 km^{2} (209.37 sq mi), it had a population density of 0.5/km^{2} (1.2/sq mi) in 2021.

In the 2016 Census of Population, the RM of Martin No. 122 recorded a population of 289 living in 115 of its 130 total private dwellings, a −13.2% change from its 2011 population of 333. With a land area of 556.5 km^{2} (214.9 sq mi), it had a population density of 0.5/km^{2} (1.3/sq mi) in 2016.

== Geography ==
=== Communities and localities ===
The following urban municipalities are surrounded by the RM.

Towns

- Wapella

The RM also surrounds the Ochapowace 71-26 First Nations Indian reserve.

== Government ==
The RM of Martin No. 122 is governed by an elected municipal council and an appointed administrator that meets on the second Wednesday of every month. The reeve of the RM is Gerald Flaman while its administrator is Cheryl Barrett. The RM's office is located in Moosomin.
