= Erroll Kinistino =

Canadian First Nations artist and speaker

- Born: 1951 or 1952 (age 73–74); Whitewood, Saskatchewan, Canada
- Education: Saskatchewan Indian Federated College
- Occupations: Actor; director; musician; public speaker
- Spouse: Josie

Erroll Kinistino (born 1951 or 1952) is a Canadian First Nations (Saulteaux) stage, radio, television and film actor, director, musician and public speaker.

== Early life and background ==
Born in Whitewood, Saskatchewan, in 1951 or 1952, (Note: On December 3, 1992, Kinistino was reported to be 40 years old, and on October 23, 2000, Kinistino was reported to be 48 years old.) Kinistino is a member of the Ochapowace Nation. He was first exposed to media as a child listening to the radio while growing up in Ochpowace, tuning into stations such as CKCK and CJME where he listened to sports and popular music like the Beatles and Elvis Presley. The family lived in a two-room, mud shack cabin without electricity. His mother, Rosalie, attended a bible college in Moose Jaw, and his father, Laurence, often listened to evangelical programming led by Oral Roberts and Billy Graham. Kinistino is one of nine siblings.

A pupil of the Canadian Indian residential school system, Kinistino attended Gordon's Indian Residential School in Punnichy and later graduated from Grenfell Consolidated High School in Grenfell. He briefly attended the University of Western Ontario to study radio broadcasting and journalism before beginning his acting career at theatres in Orillia, Regina and Winnipeg. In 1988, he graduated from the Saskatchewan Indian Federated College's Indian Communication Arts (INCA) program.

== Career ==
In 1992, he was cast to portray Leon Deela in the CBC Television drama series North of 60. He is also known for his portrayal of Phil Kinistino, a bartender on Corner Gas.

Kinistino presents theatre workshops in Canadian First Nation communities and speaks on topics such as HIV/AIDS awareness, leadership, and suicide prevention, incorporating theatrical skits into his talks. He was active as a cultural festival organizer, master of ceremonies, and elder at cultural ceremonies.

A singer-songwriter and musician, he plays the guitar, drums, and harmonica. In 2024, he performed as a member of Erroll Kinistino and the Dog River Band, along with his wife Josie (from the White Bear First Nations) and Greg Campeau (from Muskowekwan First Nation).

In 2025, he was honoured with the Saskatchewan Indigenous Music Achievement Award and the King Charles III Coronation Medal.

== Filmography ==
=== Movies ===
Year	Title
1999	Revenge of the Land
2000	Trial by Fire
2008	Out in the Cold
2010	This Time Last Winter
2013	2 ½ Scenes and the Other
2014	Corner Gas: The Movie
2016	The Land of Rock and Gold
2023	Honouring the Buffalo

=== Television shows ===
Year(s)	Title	Episodes
1992–1997	North of 60	55
1998	Big Bear	1
2003	Moccasin Flats	1
2006–2009	Corner Gas	9
