= Langbank, Saskatchewan =

Hamlet in Saskatchewan, Canada

Coordinates: 50°02′54″N 102°17′49″W

Location of Langbank in Saskatchewan

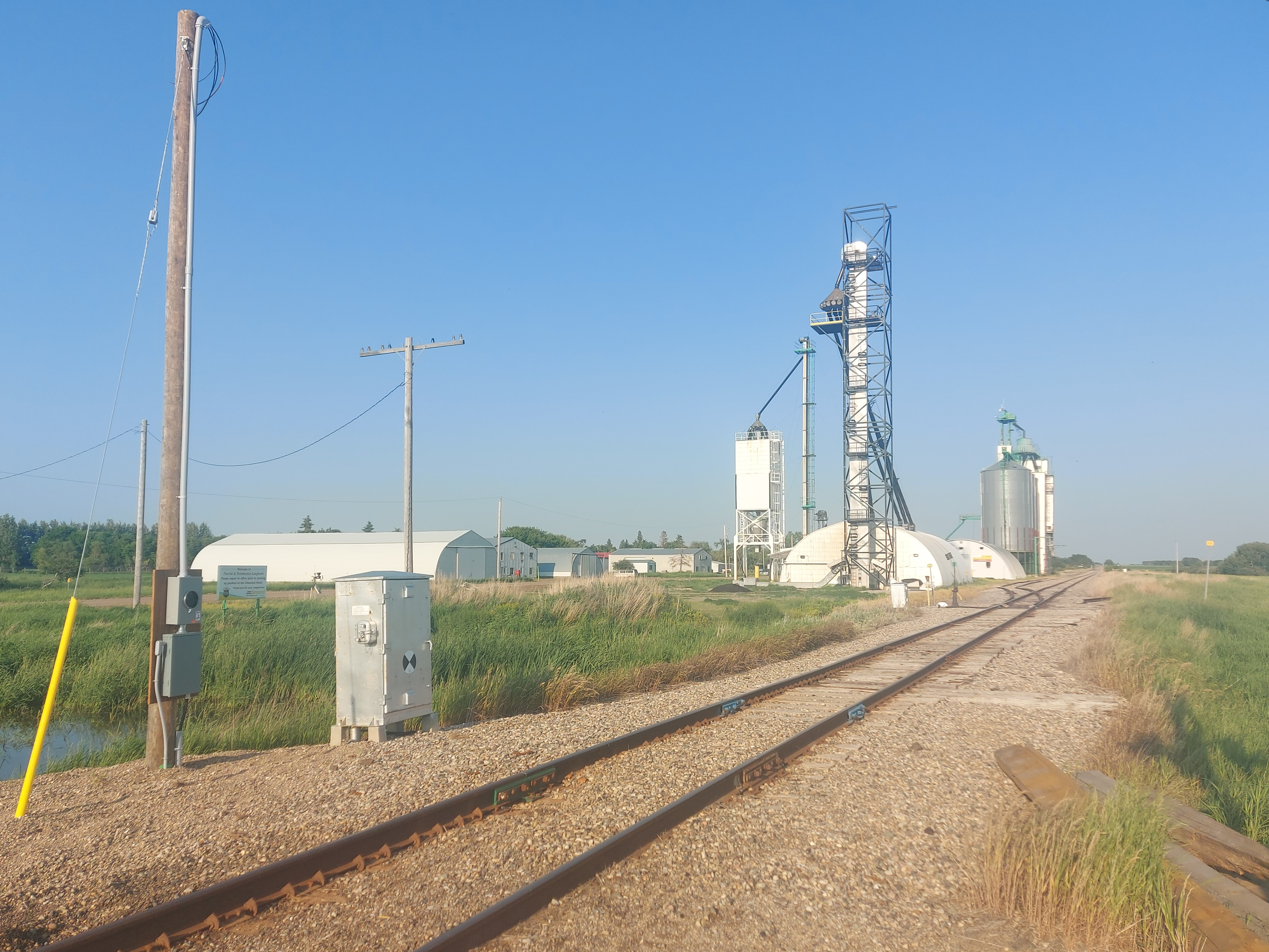
Langbank

Langbank is a hamlet within the Rural Municipality of Silverwood No. 123 in the Canadian province of Saskatchewan. Access is from Highway 9.

== History ==
Langbank received a post office in 1910. It was named after Langbank in Renfrewshire, Scotland, supposedly by a Canadian National Railway official on the suggestion of Duncan Monroe.

== Demographics ==
In the 2021 Census of Population conducted by Statistics Canada, Langbank had a population of 20 living in 10 of its 12 total private dwellings, a change of -20% from its 2016 population of 25. With a land area of 0.2 km^{2} (0.077 sq mi), it had a population density of 100.0/km^{2} (259.0/sq mi) in 2021.

== See also ==
- List of communities in Saskatchewan
