= Rural Municipality of Willowdale No. 153 =

Rural municipality in Saskatchewan, Canada

Willowdale No. 153
- Rural municipality
- Rural Municipality of Willowdale No. 153
- Location of the RM of Willowdale No. 153 in Saskatchewan
- Coordinates: 50.454°N 102.240°W
- Country: Canada
- Province: Saskatchewan
- Census division: 5
- SARM division: 1
- Formed: January 1, 1913

Government
  - Reeve: Larry Sippola
  - Governing body: RM of Willowdale No. 153 Council
  - Administrator: Andrea Smyth
  - Office location: Whitewood

Area (2016)
  - Land: 604.13 km^{2} (233.26 sq mi)

Population (2016)
  - Total: 299
  - Density: 0.5/km^{2} (1.3/sq mi)
- Time zone: CST
  - Summer (DST): CST
- Postal code: S0G 5C0
- Area codes: 306 and 639

The Rural Municipality of Willowdale No. 153 (2016 population: 299) is a rural municipality (RM) in the southeast portion of the Canadian province of Saskatchewan within Census Division No. 5 and SARM Division No. 1.

== History ==
RM of Willowdale No. 153 Municipal Office (Whitewood Post Office)
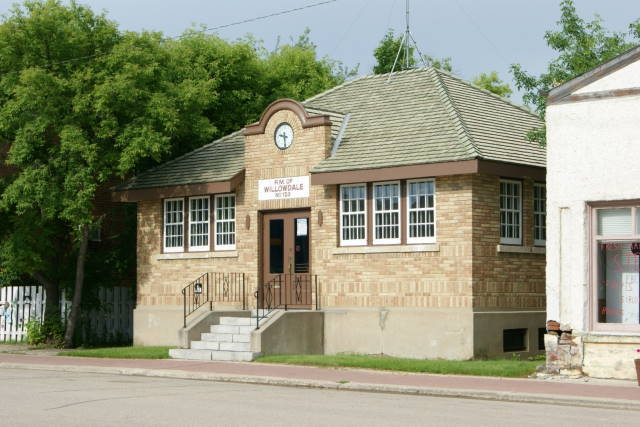

General information
- Location: 711 Lalonde Street, Whitewood, Saskatchewan, Canada
- Construction started: 1935
- Completed: 1936

Design and construction
- Architect: Thomas Fuller

The RM of Willowdale No. 153 incorporated as a rural municipality on January 1, 1913.

Heritage properties

New Finland is a Finnish speaking block settlement locates within the RM. The St. John's New Finland Lutheran Church, with an active congregation, was officially declared a municipal heritage property on May 4, 2007. The church building was built in 1907, and then the community moved it in 1934 by steam engine to the present location five miles south of the original construction site. This arduous undertaking necessitated sawing the church in half.

The RM's municipal office building, located at 711 Lalonde Street in Whitewood, was originally built in 1935 to house Whitewood's post office. The building is a designated heritage property. The building was constructed by the federal government as a make-work project during the depression era.

== Geography ==
The burrowing owl (athene cunicularia), an endangered animal, makes its home in this area, and the monarch butterfly (danaus plexippus) is also monitored in this area by conservationists.

=== Communities and localities ===
The following urban municipalities are surrounded by the RM.

Towns

- Whitewood

== Demographics ==
Population history (1981–2016)
Year	Pop.	±%
1981	676	—
1986	567	−16.1%
1991	499	−12.0%
1996	408	−18.2%
2001	301	−26.2%
2006	333	+10.6%
2011	297	−10.8%
2016	299	+0.7%
Source: Statistics Canada via Saskatchewan Bureau of Statistics

In the 2021 Census of Population conducted by Statistics Canada, the RM of Willowdale No. 153 had a population of 248 living in 91 of its 99 total private dwellings, a change of −15.6% from its 2016 population of 294. With a land area of 594.03 km^{2} (229.36 sq mi), it had a population density of 0.4/km^{2} (1.1/sq mi) in 2021.

In the 2016 Census of Population, the RM of Willowdale No. 153 recorded a population of 299 living in 116 of its 133 total private dwellings, a 0.7% change from its 2011 population of 297. With a land area of 604.13 km^{2} (233.26 sq mi), it had a population density of 0.5/km^{2} (1.3/sq mi) in 2016.

== Government ==
The RM of Willowdale No. 153 is governed by an elected municipal council and an appointed administrator that meets on the second Wednesday of every month. The reeve of the RM is Larry Sippola while its administrator is Andrea Smyth. The RM's office is located in Whitewood.

== See also ==
- List of rural municipalities in Saskatchewan
