= Ochapowace 71-10 =

Indian reserve in Saskatchewan, Canada

Coordinates: 50°21′59″N 102°04′36″W

- Indian reserve
- Ochapowace Indian Reserve No. 71-10
- Location in Saskatchewan
- First Nation: Ochapowace
- Country: Canada
- Province: Saskatchewan

Area
  - Total: 192.3 ha (475 acres)

Population (2016)
  - Total: 0
  - Density: 0.0/km^{2} (0.0/sq mi)

Ochapowace 71-10 is an Indian reserve of the Ochapowace Nation in Saskatchewan. It is about 16 kilometres (9.9 mi) north-east of Whitewood. In the 2016 Canadian Census, it recorded a population of 0 living in 0 of its 0 total private dwellings.

== See also ==
- List of Indian reserves in Saskatchewan
