= Whitewood Herald =

Canadian newspaper in Saskatchewan

The Whitewood Herald
- Type: Weekly newspaper
- Format: Print and digital (PDF)
- Owner: Grasslands News Group
- Founder: F.J. Greenstreet
- Publisher: Chris Ashfield (Group Publisher)
- Editor: Chris Ashfield
- Language: English
- Headquarters: South Railway Street, Whitewood, Saskatchewan, Canada

The Whitewood Herald is a Canadian weekly newspaper located in southeastern Saskatchewan in the community of Whitewood, Saskatchewan. Publishing since 1892, it is the oldest continuing weekly newspaper in Saskatchewan.

The first issue of The Whitewood Herald rolled off the press during the first week of April. 1892. F.J. Greenstreet was the publisher and editor at that time. This plant was moved from Elkhorn, Manitoba to Whitewood, Saskatchewan by Mr. Greenstreet, who carried on as publisher and editor until his death a few years later. The plant consisted of a job press, a small army press, a few cases of type and make-up stones. It was first housed in a dwelling situated on North Railway Street, later occupied by Mr. and Mrs. W. Armstrong and family. Soon after it was moved to a building situated where Schmidt Bros. Garage later stood.

Following Mr. Greenstreet's death, Mrs. Greenstreet took over her husband's duties. John Hawkes leased the business and acted as editor from 1897 to 1 Nov. 1890 when he moved to Carnduff to take over a plant he had purchased there. Bruce Bennett then assisted Mrs. Greenstreet, owner of the plant, until early in 1900 when he left to work in Vancouver, British Columbia.

When John Scott purchased the business from Mrs. Greenstreet on November 1, 1900, the plant equipment was very meager, but new equipment was added soon after. A year or two following Mr. Scott's purchase of the business, the plant was moved to a site on 3rd Ave. More modern machinery was added during the years that Mr. Scott published The Herald and in 1950 an Optimus 35 press was installed. At that time, The Herald's subscription list was approaching the 1000 mark. John Scott sold the business to the Ashfield Bros. of Grenfell in August 1955.

== The Ashfield Era ==
When the Ashfield Bros. bought The Whitewood Herald it was housed in an old 2 story frame building, a portion of which was built of log with lath and plaster walls. It had formerly been the Immigrants Hall and was located on the present site of the doctors office on 3rd Ave. In 1965, Joe Ashfield constructed a new Herald building directly west and adjacent to the old building, which was later torn down. The plant was housed in the basement of the new building.

J.R. Ashfield was publisher and editor from 1955 until 1978 when his nephew Cliff Ashfield and wife Elaine became managers for one year. In the fall of 1979, the couple purchased the printing business from Joe Ashfield. They remained in The Herald building on 3rd Ave. until the fall of 1988 when they constructed a new building on South Railway Street, east of Lalonde Street. This location is the site of the present Whitewood Herald office, which also provides printing services to the community as well as stationery supplies.

After graduating from school in 1993, Cliff and Elaine's youngest son Chris joined them full-time in the publishing of The Herald. This was a move that was recognized in the weekly industry right across Canada as Chris become the fourth consecutive generation of the family to be involved with the weekly newspaper industry. He has served as editor since 1995 and continues to do so today. In August 2000, after more than 30 years in the industry, Cliff retired. Then in 2007, Elaine stepped back from the operation and Chris took over handling the daily operation of the business. On January 1, 2011, Chris purchased the Herald. During his time in the newspaper industry, Chris has spent decades representing the industry at both the provincial and national levels, serving on the Saskatchewan Weekly Newspapers Association board of directors from 1995 until the present, and the Canadian Community Newspapers Association board of directors from 2001 until 2013.

In October 2013, the Herald was sold to Grasslands News Group, a company founded by four newspaper partners consisting of Chris Ashfield, Greg Nesbitt and Ryan Nesbitt of Shoal Lake, MB, and George Brown, of Ponoko, AB. Chris become the group publisher of the publications with Brown taking on the role of managing editor. Greg Nesbitt is the company's Chief Financial Officier (CFO) while Ryan provides support as needed in the areas of production and design. Along with the Herald, Grasslands News Group also purchased the Melville Advance and the Fort Qu'Appelle Times.

== Accomplishments ==
Since taking over the newspaper in 1979, the Ashfield family has won over 100 awards of excellence, from both provincial and national levels, for their newspaper. The Herald was the first weekly newspaper in the province and most of Canada to electronically transfer their paper to their printing press in Moose Jaw, some two-and-a-half hours away. It was also one of the first weekly newspapers to provide a website. Then in 2003, The Herald became the first weekly publication in Saskatchewan to offer electronic subscriptions of their newspaper, a feature which provides a portable document file (pdf) version of the paper. This gave readers anywhere in the world the opportunity to receive The Herald the same day as subscribers in Whitewood.

== See also ==
- List of newspapers in Canada
