= Ochapowace 71 =

Coordinates: 50°28′34″N 102°23′57″W

- Indian reserve
- Ochapowace Indian Reserve No. 71
- Location in Saskatchewan
- First Nation: Ochapowace
- Country: Canada
- Province: Saskatchewan

Area
  - Total: 13,970.6 ha (34,522 acres)

Population (2016)
  - Total: 426
  - Density: 3.05/km^{2} (7.90/sq mi)
- Community Well-Being Index: 61

Ochapowace 71 is an Indian reserve of the Ochapowace Nation in Saskatchewan. It is 8 kilometres northeast of Broadview. In the 2016 Canadian Census, it recorded a population of 426 living in 126 of its 138 total private dwellings. In the same year, its Community Well-Being index was calculated at 61 of 100, compared to 58.4 for the average First Nations community and 77.5 for the average non-Indigenous community.
