= Wapella, Saskatchewan =

Town in Saskatchewan, Canada

- Town
- Location within Saskatchewan Location within Canada
- Coordinates: 50.251083°N 101.978966°W
- Country: Canada
- Province: Saskatchewan
- Census division: 5
- Rural Municipality: Martin No. 122

Government
  - Mayor: Gale Matheson
  - Governing body: Wapella Town Council

Area
  - Total: 838.836 km^{2} (323.876 sq mi)
- Elevation: 587 m (1,926 ft)

Population (2001)
  - Total: 354
- Time zone: CST
- Postal code: S0G 4Z0
- Area code: 306

Wapella (/wəˈpɛlə/) is a town of 354 located northwest of Moosomin on the Trans-Canada Highway.

== Demographics ==
In the 2021 Census of Population conducted by Statistics Canada, Wapella had a population of 278 living in 117 of its 143 total private dwellings, a change of −14.7% from its 2016 population of 326. With a land area of 2.63 km^{2} (1.02 sq mi), it had a population density of 105.7/km^{2} (273.8/sq mi) in 2021.

== Climate ==
Climate data for Wapella
| Month | Jan | Feb | Mar | Apr | May | Jun | Jul | Aug | Sep | Oct | Nov | Dec | Year |
|---|---|---|---|---|---|---|---|---|---|---|---|---|---|
| Record high °C (°F) | 8 (46) | 9 (48) | 21 (70) | 32.5 (90.5) | 36.5 (97.7) | 35.5 (95.9) | 38 (100) | 37.5 (99.5) | 33.5 (92.3) | 29.5 (85.1) | 22.5 (72.5) | 12 (54) | 38 (100) |
| Mean daily maximum °C (°F) | −10.5 (13.1) | −6.7 (19.9) | −0.3 (31.5) | 10 (50) | 17.8 (64.0) | 21.8 (71.2) | 24.4 (75.9) | 24 (75) | 17.6 (63.7) | 10 (50) | −1.3 (29.7) | −8.6 (16.5) | 8.2 (46.8) |
| Daily mean °C (°F) | −15.8 (3.6) | −11.4 (11.5) | −5.2 (22.6) | 3.9 (39.0) | 11 (52) | 15.5 (59.9) | 18.1 (64.6) | 17.3 (63.1) | 11.4 (52.5) | 4.6 (40.3) | −5.5 (22.1) | −13.4 (7.9) | 2.5 (36.5) |
| Mean daily minimum °C (°F) | −21 (−6) | −16.2 (2.8) | −10.2 (13.6) | −2.2 (28.0) | 4.2 (39.6) | 9.2 (48.6) | 11.6 (52.9) | 10.6 (51.1) | 5 (41) | −0.9 (30.4) | −9.7 (14.5) | −18.1 (−0.6) | −3.1 (26.4) |
| Record low °C (°F) | −42 (−44) | −41 (−42) | −35.5 (−31.9) | −23.5 (−10.3) | −11.5 (11.3) | −2 (28) | 2 (36) | −3.5 (25.7) | −7.5 (18.5) | −21 (−6) | −36.5 (−33.7) | −42 (−44) | −42 (−44) |
| Average precipitation mm (inches) | 19.8 (0.78) | 16.9 (0.67) | 21.8 (0.86) | 21.1 (0.83) | 49.5 (1.95) | 70.5 (2.78) | 69.7 (2.74) | 66 (2.6) | 47.9 (1.89) | 27.8 (1.09) | 18.5 (0.73) | 16.4 (0.65) | 445.7 (17.55) |
Source: Environment Canada

== Infrastructure ==
Wapella is located on Highway 601 and Saskatchewan Highway 1.

== Notable people ==
- Brett Clark, professional hockey player in NHL
- Bud Holloway, a professional hockey player
- Cyril Edel Leonoff is the grandson of Edel Brotman, a homesteader and rabbi of the Wapella, Saskatchewan, farm colony, 1889–1906.

== See also ==
- List of communities in Saskatchewan
- List of place names in Canada of Indigenous origin
- List of towns in Saskatchewan
