= Ochapowace 71-54 =

Indian reserve in Saskatchewan, Canada

Coordinates: 50°28′23″N 102°09′39″W

- Indian reserve
- Ochapowace Indian Reserve No. 71-54
- Location in Saskatchewan
- First Nation: Ochapowace
- Country: Canada
- Province: Saskatchewan

Area
  - Total: 129.1 ha (319 acres)

Population (2016)
  - Total: 0
  - Density: 0.0/km^{2} (0.0/sq mi)

Ochapowace 71-54 is an Indian reserve of the Ochapowace Nation in Saskatchewan. It is about 16 kilometres (9.9 mi) south-east of Bird's Point. In the 2016 Canadian Census, it recorded a population of 0 living in 0 of its 0 total private dwellings.

== See also ==
- List of Indian reserves in Saskatchewan
