= Ochapowace Nation =

North American Indigenous people

- Band No. 363
- People: Cree
- Treaty: Treaty 4
- Headquarters: Whitewood
- Province: Saskatchewan

Land
- Main reserve: Ochapowace 71
- Reserves: Ochapowace 71-1 thru; Ochapowace 71-132

Population (2019)
- On reserve: 642
- On other land: 1
- Off reserve: 1247
- Total population: 1890

Government
- Chief: Shelley Bear

Website
- ochapowace.com

The Ochapowace Nation (Cree: ᐅᒑᐳᐍᐢ ocâpowês) is a Cree First Nation in southern Saskatchewan, Canada.

Prior to colonization, the Ochapowace controlled the land which was transferred to the Esterházy, a Hungarian noble family. The First Nation was established on September 15, 1874, as a result of the signing of Treaty 4. Surveyed in 1876, its area was bounded between he northern end of Round Lake and the Qu'Appelle River. In 1881, by request of Kakisheway – an aboriginal leader – for moving, the Nation was combined with the Chacachas. After many Ochapowace members returned to the combined group, a group of approximately 45 joined Kakisheway and became nomadic. In September 2016, they became a signatory of the Buffalo Treaty.

== Reserves ==
Reserves include

- Ochapowace 71
- Ochapowace 71-1
- Ochapowace 71-2
- Ochapowace 71-3
- Ochapowace 71-4
- Ochapowace 71-5
- Ochapowace 71-6
- Ochapowace 71-7
- Ochapowace 71-8
- Ochapowace 71-9
- Ochapowace 71-10
- Ochapowace 71-11
- Ochapowace 71-12
- Ochapowace 71-13
- Ochapowace 71-14
- Ochapowace 71-15
- Ochapowace 71-16
- Ochapowace 71-17
- Ochapowace 71-18
- Ochapowace 71-19
- Ochapowace 71-20
- Ochapowace 71-21
- Ochapowace 71-22
- Ochapowace 71-23
- Ochapowace 71-24
- Ochapowace 71-25
- Ochapowace 71-26
- Ochapowace 71-27
- Ochapowace 71-28
- Ochapowace 71-29
- Ochapowace 71-30
- Ochapowace 71-31
- Ochapowace 71-32
- Ochapowace 71-33
- Ochapowace 71-34
- Ochapowace 71-35
- Ochapowace 71-36
- Ochapowace 71-37
- Ochapowace 71-38
- Ochapowace 71-39
- Ochapowace 71-40
- Ochapowace 71-41
- Ochapowace 71-42
- Ochapowace 71-43
- Ochapowace 71-44
- Ochapowace 71-45
- Ochapowace 71-46
- Ochapowace 71-47
- Ochapowace 71-48
- Ochapowace 71-49
- Ochapowace 71-50
- Ochapowace 71-51
- Ochapowace 71-52
- Ochapowace 71-53
- Ochapowace 71-54
- Ochapowace 71-55
- Ochapowace 71-56
- Ochapowace 71-57
- Ochapowace 71-59
- Ochapowace 71-60
- Ochapowace 71-61
- Ochapowace 71-62
- Ochapowace 71-63
- Ochapowace 71-64
- Ochapowace 71-65
- Ochapowace 71-66
- Ochapowace 71-67
- Ochapowace 71-68
- Ochapowace 71-69
- Ochapowace 71-70
- Ochapowace 71-71
- Ochapowace 71-72
- Ochapowace 71-73
- Ochapowace 71-74
- Ochapowace 71-75
- Ochapowace 71-76
- Ochapowace 71-77
- Ochapowace 71-78
- Ochapowace 71-79
- Ochapowace 71-80
- Ochapowace 71-82
- Ochapowace 71-83
- Ochapowace 71-86
- Ochapowace 71-87
- Ochapowace 71-88
- Ochapowace 71-89
- Ochapowace 71-91
- Ochapowace 71-92
- Ochapowace 71-93
- Ochapowace 71-94
- Ochapowace 71-95
- Ochapowace 71-96
- Ochapowace 71-97
- Ochapowace 71-98
- Ochapowace 71-99
- Ochapowace 71-100
- Ochapowace 71-101
- Ochapowace 71-102
- Ochapowace 71-103
- Ochapowace 71-104
- Ochapowace 71-105
- Ochapowace 71-106
- Ochapowace 71-107
- Ochapowace 71-108
- Ochapowace 71-109
- Ochapowace 71-110
- Ochapowace 71-112
- Ochapowace 71-115
- Ochapowace 71-116
- Ochapowace 71-117
- Ochapowace 71-118
- Ochapowace 71-119
- Ochapowace 71-120
- Ochapowace 71-121
- Ochapowace 71-122
- Ochapowace 71-123
- Ochapowace 71-124
- Ochapowace 71-125
- Ochapowace 71-126
- Ochapowace 71-127
- Ochapowace 71-128
- Ochapowace 71-129
- Ochapowace 71-130
- Ochapowace 71-131
- Ochapowace 71-132
- Treaty Four Reserve Grounds 77, shared with 32 other bands.

== Notable people ==
- Ethan Bear (born 1997), ice hockey player
- Erroll Kinistino (born 1951 or 1952), actor, musician, director, and public speaker
