= Ochapowace 71-26 =

Indian reserve in Saskatchewan, Canada

Coordinates: 50°15′54″N 101°47′50″W

- Indian reserve
- Ochapowace Indian Reserve No. 71-26
- Location in Saskatchewan
- First Nation: Ochapowace
- Country: Canada
- Province: Saskatchewan

Area
  - Total: 258.9 ha (640 acres)

Population (2016)
  - Total: 0
  - Density: 0.0/km^{2} (0.0/sq mi)

Ochapowace 71-26 is an Indian reserve of the Ochapowace Nation in Saskatchewan. It is about 13 kilometres (8.1 mi) north of Moosomin. In the 2016 Canadian Census, it recorded a population of 0 living in 0 of its 0 total private dwellings.

== See also ==
- List of Indian reserves in Saskatchewan
