= Whitewood, Saskatchewan =

Town in Saskatchewan, Canada

Whitewood Whitewood Station
- Town
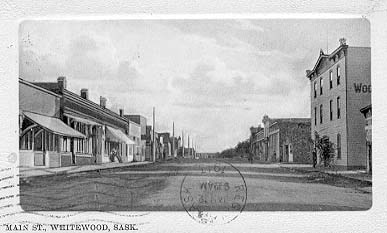
- Main Street, Whitewood, 1913

- Location within Saskatchewan Location within Canada
- Coordinates: 50°19′52″N 102°16′11″W
- Country: Canada
- Province: Saskatchewan
- Census division: 5
- Rural Municipality (RM): Willowdale No. 153
- Post office founded: 1883-11-09
- Incorporated Town: 1892
- Named for: White Poplar (Populus alba) Whitewood tree

Government
  - Mayor: Rhett Parks
  - Governing body: Whitewood Town Council
  - Member of legislative assembly: Kevin Weedmark
  - Member of Parliament: Robert Kitchen

Area
  - Total: 3.04 km^{2} (1.17 sq mi)
- Elevation: 598.30 m (1,962.9 ft)

Population (2021)
  - Total: 944
  - Density: 312/km^{2} (810/sq mi)
- Time zone: UTC-6 (CST (UTC))
- Postal code: S0G 5C0
- Area code: 306
- List of Saskatchewan provincial highways: Sk Hwy 1, Sk Hwy 9
- Website: www.townofwhitewood.ca

Whitewood is a town in the Canadian province of Saskatchewan. It is approximately 175 kilometres (109 mi) east of Regina on Highway 1, the Trans-Canada Highway. It is situated at the crossroads of two major highways systems — the Trans-Canada, which runs east and west, and Highway 9, which runs north and south from the US border to Hudson Bay, Saskatchewan. It is located midway between Brandon, Manitoba and Regina.

It is administrative headquarters of the First Nations band governments of the Ochapowace and the Chachacas Cree.

== History ==
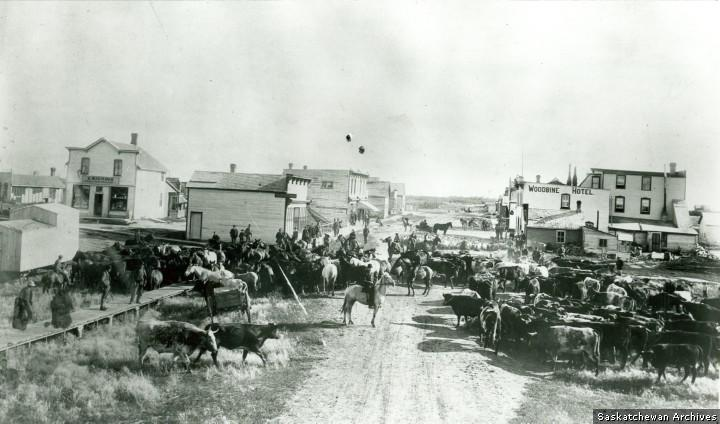
Cattle, horses, and sheep were all rounded up for market day in Whitewood, 1901

Before the settlement of the west, Whitewood began as a crossing of trails between the Qu'Appelle Valley to the north and the Moose Mountains to the south. A Hudson's Bay Company trading post was operated there from about the fall of 1891 to approximately the spring of 1906.

With the settlement of the west and the coming of the Trans-Continental railway, Whitewood quickly grew into a thriving community. The CPR naming was derived from the White Poplar (Populus alba), a deciduous tree with white bark, which was plentiful in the area.

By 1882, the town of Whitewood, Provisional District of Assiniboia, North-West Territories was a major stop on the Canadian Pacific Railway. The town grew steadily from that time and was incorporated as a town in 1892. An interesting note is that while the Town Seal has "Incorporated 1893" on it the actual incorporation took place on 30 December 1892.

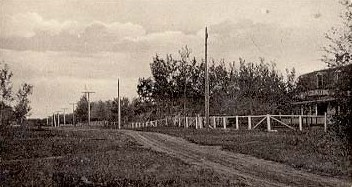
Whitewood residential street in the 1910s

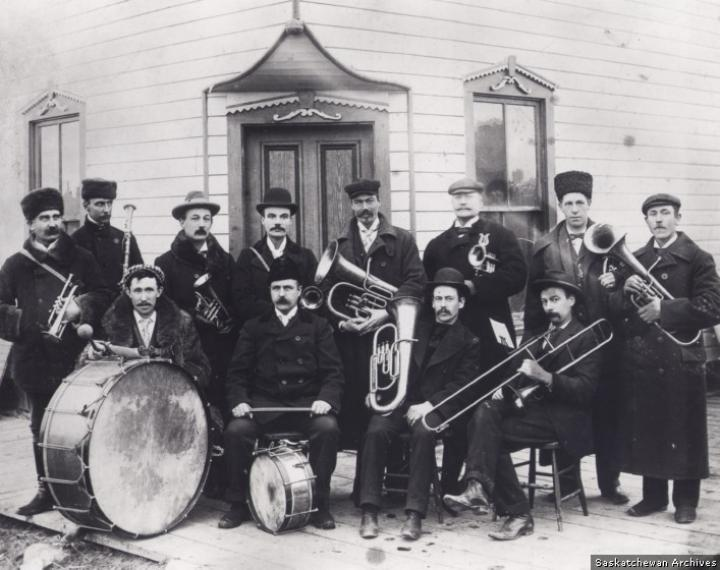
The Whitewood band, including some of the French aristocrats from St. Hubert, previously La Rolanderie, 1904

Settlers from many lands came to the area and the multi-national character of the community is seen in the names of the residents. The first Finnish settlement in the west, New Finland is located here, and Hungarians, Swedes, Germans, Poles, Russians, Czechs, English, Scottish and Irish, also made Whitewood their destination in the new world. To quote a prominent writer of that period, and resident of Whitewood John Hawkes, "Whitewood was in the eighties (1880s) the most cosmopolitan point in the west. It came to be a saying that one should know eleven languages to do business in Whitewood." Hawkes penned Saskatchewan and Its People in three volumes.

One of the most unusual and glamorous settlements was that of the French Counts of St Hubert, Saskatchewan. Headed by the educated Dr Rudolph Meyer, this group of Belgian and French aristocrats aimed to build a life on the Canadian prairies in the style of the French nobility in Europe. Annually the Counts booked the Whitewood Commercial Hotel for the Frenchman's Ball. "Many pretty dresses of the style of the late eighties were in evidence, souvenirs perhaps of better days across the sea. The vivacious Frenchwomen of gentle birth and breeding in fashionable décolleté gowns and jeweled neck and arms lent an air of distinction in spite of the incongruity of the crude setting".

Remains of this settlement still exist and many residents of the community are proud of their connection to the Most Romantic Settlement in the West.

== Geography ==
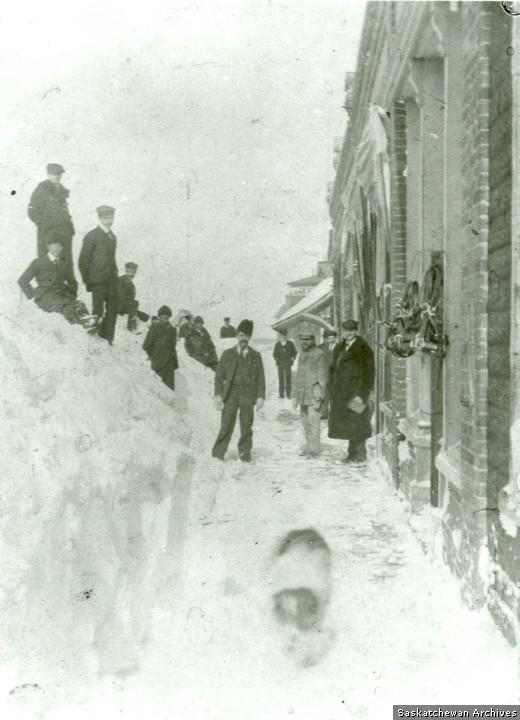
Three-metre snow drifts lined the sidewalks in Whitewood, 1904

Whitewood is located in the north eastern section of the topographical area named Wood Hills to the north of Moose Mountain and south of the Qu'Appelle River. Whitewood is situated in the Melville Plain of the Aspen Parkland ecoregion.

Burrows, Clayridge, Forest Farm, St. Luke, and St. Hubert Mission are small unincorporated areas near Whitewood. The Ochapowace (Ochapowace) Indian Reserve is nearby.

=== Climate ===
Whitewood has a humid continental climate, with extreme seasonal temperatures. It has warm summers and cold winters, with the average daily temperatures ranging from −16.5 °C (2.3 °F) in January to 18.2 °C (64.8 °F) in July. Annually, temperatures exceed 30 °C (86 °F) on an average in late July Typically, summer lasts from late June until late August, and the humidity is seldom uncomfortably high. Winter lasts from November to March, and varies greatly in length and severity. Spring and autumn are both short and highly variable. On 5 July 1937 an extreme high of 41.1 °C (106.0 °F) was recorded, and on 12 January 1916, a record low of −45.6 °C (−50.1 °F).

Climate data for Weyburn
| Month | Jan | Feb | Mar | Apr | May | Jun | Jul | Aug | Sep | Oct | Nov | Dec | Year |
|---|---|---|---|---|---|---|---|---|---|---|---|---|---|
| Record high °C (°F) | 9.5 (49.1) | 12.2 (54.0) | 20.6 (69.1) | 32.2 (90.0) | 37.8 (100.0) | 40.6 (105.1) | 41.1 (106.0) | 38.0 (100.4) | 36.7 (98.1) | 29.5 (85.1) | 22.5 (72.5) | 13.0 (55.4) | 41.1 (106.0) |
| Mean daily maximum °C (°F) | −11.0 (12.2) | −7.1 (19.2) | −0.9 (30.4) | 9.4 (48.9) | 17.6 (63.7) | 22.0 (71.6) | 24.7 (76.5) | 23.7 (74.7) | 17.5 (63.5) | 10.3 (50.5) | −1.2 (29.8) | −8.6 (16.5) | 8.0 (46.4) |
| Daily mean °C (°F) | −16.5 (2.3) | −12.3 (9.9) | −6.1 (21.0) | 3.5 (38.3) | 11.0 (51.8) | 15.6 (60.1) | 18.2 (64.8) | 16.9 (62.4) | 11.2 (52.2) | 4.6 (40.3) | −5.7 (21.7) | −13.5 (7.7) | 2.3 (36.1) |
| Mean daily minimum °C (°F) | −21.9 (−7.4) | −17.4 (0.7) | −11.1 (12.0) | −2.4 (27.7) | 4.4 (39.9) | 9.3 (48.7) | 11.6 (52.9) | 10.1 (50.2) | 4.9 (40.8) | −1.2 (29.8) | −10.3 (13.5) | −18.4 (−1.1) | −3.5 (25.7) |
| Record low °C (°F) | −45.6 (−50.1) | −44.4 (−47.9) | −44.4 (−47.9) | −27.8 (−18.0) | −13.0 (8.6) | −4.4 (24.1) | 0.0 (32.0) | −3.0 (26.6) | −12.8 (9.0) | −25.6 (−14.1) | −37.0 (−34.6) | −41.0 (−41.8) | −45.6 (−50.1) |
| Average precipitation mm (inches) | 26.0 (1.02) | 19.5 (0.77) | 29.1 (1.15) | 26.8 (1.06) | 55.0 (2.17) | 80.8 (3.18) | 72.3 (2.85) | 68.9 (2.71) | 51.8 (2.04) | 28.3 (1.11) | 21.4 (0.84) | 26.8 (1.06) | 506.6 (19.94) |
Source: Environment Canada

== Demographics ==
Historical Population
| Year | Pop. | ±% |
|---|---|---|
| 1901 | 359 | — |
| 1906 | 501 | +39.6% |
| 1911 | 447 | −10.8% |
| 1916 | 446 | −0.2% |
| 1996 | 985 | +120.9% |
| 2001 | 947 | −3.9% |
| 2006 | 869 | −8.2% |

In the 2021 Census of Population conducted by Statistics Canada, Whitewood had a population of 944 living in 411 of its 479 total private dwellings, a change of 9.5% from its 2016 population of 862. With a land area of 3.93 km^{2} (1.52 sq mi), it had a population density of 240.2/km^{2} (622.1/sq mi) in 2021.

Canada census – Whitewood, Saskatchewan community profile

| | 2011 |
| Population | 950 (9.3% from 2006) |
| Land area | 3.04 km^{2} (1.17 sq mi) |
| Population density | 312.0/km^{2} (808/sq mi) |
| Median age | 47.4 (M: 44.8, F: 50.1) |
| Private dwellings | 474 (total) |
| Median household income |

References: 2011

== Government ==
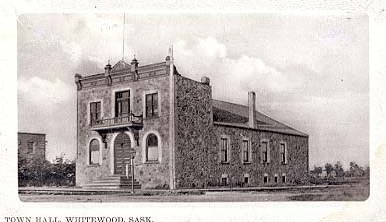
Whitewood town hall, 1913

The town of Whitewood has a mayor as the highest ranking government official. The town also elects councillors to form the municipal council. Currently the mayor is Chris Ashfield, who is serving with councillors Shawna Stradeski, Jordan Giroux, Cole Jacobs, Emerson Chug, Danielle Jones and Troy Brule. The town administrator is Lisa Istace.

Provincially, Whitewood is within the constituency of Moosomin-Montmartre served by their Member of legislative assembly, the honourable Kevin Weedmark.

Federally, the Souris—Moose Mountain riding is represented by their Member of Parliament, Steven Bonk.

== Economy ==
Economically, Whitewood is situated in the Yorkton—Melville economic region. Whitewood along with Broadview, Grenfell, Wolseley are all part of the Mainline Regional Economic Development Authority. REDA's stimulate economic growth in the local area as they are familiar with the inherent needs of the community and stimulate business and government investment resulting in job creation, tourism and recreational facilities.

== Infrastructure ==
=== Transportation ===
Whitewood Airport (TC LID: CKY2), is located adjacent to Whitewood. Whitewood was established in the late 19th century on the Canadian Pacific Railway Trans-Continental railway. Currently, Whitewood is situated at the crossroads of two major highways systems — the Trans-Canada Highway Sk Hwy 1, which runs east and west, and Sk Hwy 9, which runs north and south from the US border to Hudson Bay, Saskatchewan.

== Media ==
The Herald Sun is a weekly newspaper. Operating as the Whitewood Herald until 2015, the newspaper has been publishing since 1892, making it one of the oldest weekly newspapers in the province. John Hawkes was the editor of the Whitewood Herald from 1897 to 1900. Since 1955, the newspaper has been owned and operated by three different generations of the Ashfield family. The paper is currently owned by Grasslands News Group, of which Chris Ashfield is a part-owner.

== Museums and other points of interest ==
Whitewood has become known far and wide for its curling. The town is home to one of Canada's largest annual curling bonspiels held in one facility. Every March, the Farmers and Friends Bonspiel is held, which consists of 76-teams with 265 curlers playing 146 games of curling over four days. To accommodate the event, the Whitewood Community Centre skating arena is converted to five sheets of curling ice that is used along with the four sheets of ice on the curling arena side of the facility. The event attracts curlers of all ages and from numerous provinces, including four times Scotties Tournament of Heart champion Kerri Einarson from Manitoba. From 2016 until 2025 the event has raised $900,000, almost all of which has been donated to various groups and community projects in Whitewood and surrounding communities. Whitewood has also twice hosted the Tankard, the annual provincial championship for men's curling in Saskatchewan. Whitewood is the smallest community to have successfully hosted the event. Because of its curling fame, the town has erected the World's Largest Curling Broom at the Flag Garden, just off Highway 1.

During Whitewood's centennial year of 1992, the town collaborated on the history of the French Counts. The Merchant Bank Heritage Centre soon followed which also celebrates the French Count history and displays the welcoming sign The Most Romantic Settlement in the West.

In the fall of 2002, economic development director Janet Blackstock along with Mayor Malcolm Green aimed to restore the homes built in the late 19th century by the French aristocrats and paint outside murals in Whitewood to re-vitalize the local history. One mural was painted in 2000 showing the town in 1890. The area of Whitewood claims that during the late 19th century, there were more aristocrats here than anywhere else in North America.

== See also ==
- List of towns in Saskatchewan
