= Saskatchewan Highway 318 =

Provincial highway in Saskatchewan, Canada

Highway 318

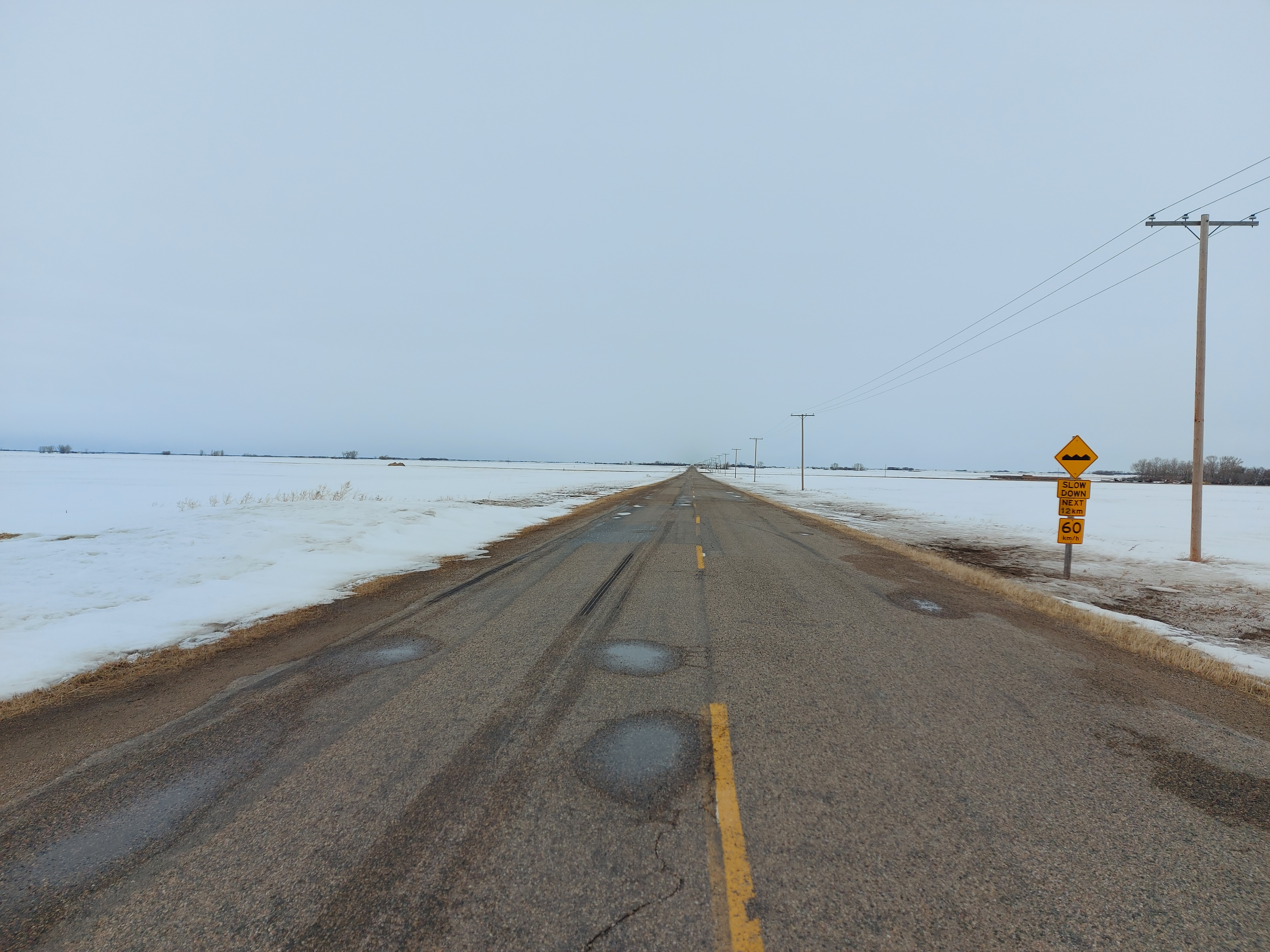
- Highway 318 north of Carnduff

Route information
- Maintained by Ministry of Highways and Infrastructure
- Length: 27.9 km (17.3 mi)

Major junctions
- South end: Highway 18 at Carnduff
- North end: Highway 361 near Alida

Location
- Country: Canada
- Province: Saskatchewan
- Rural municipalities: Mount Pleasant, Reciprocity

Highway system
- Provincial highways in Saskatchewan
← Highway 317	→ Highway 320

Highway 318 is a provincial highway in the Canadian province of Saskatchewan. It runs from Highway 18 near Carnduff to Highway 361 near Alida. It is about 28 kilometres (17 mi) long.

== Route description ==
Highway 318 begins in the Rural Municipality of Mount Pleasant No. 2 in the town of Carnduff at an intersection with Highway 18 (Park Street) across the railway track from downtown. It heads north through a neighbourhood, then an industrial area, before leaving Carnduff and crossing a bridge over the Antler River. With the highway turning to gravel, it enters the Rural Municipality of Reciprocity No. 32 and goes through a majorly sharp and sudden switchback, where it regains asphalt, to travel through rural farmland for several kilometres to an end at an intersection with Highway 361 just to the south of the village of Alida, with the road continuing on as westbound Hwy 361 towards its junction with Highway 601. The entire length of Highway 318 is a two-lane highway.

== Major intersections ==
Rural municipality	Location	km	mi	Destinations	Notes
Mount Pleasant No. 2	Carnduff	0.0	0.0	Highway 18 (Park Street) – Carievale, Glen Ewen	Southern terminus; road continues south as 3rd Street W
Mount Pleasant No. 2		1.9	1.2	Bridge over the Antler River	
Mount Pleasant No. 2		5.0	3.1	Township Road 33	Southern end of unpaved section
Reciprocity No. 32		16.5	10.3	Range Road 1330 / Township Road 44	Hwy 318 turns left
Reciprocity No. 32		21.5	13.4	Township Road 44 / Range Road 1333	Hwy 318 turns right; northern end of unpaved section
Reciprocity No. 32		27.9	17.3	Highway 361 – Alida, Storthoaks	Northern terminus; road continues north as westbound Hwy 361
1.000 mi = 1.609 km; 1.000 km = 0.621 mi

== See also ==
- Roads in Saskatchewan
- Transportation in Saskatchewan
