= Gainsborough Creek =

River in Western Canada

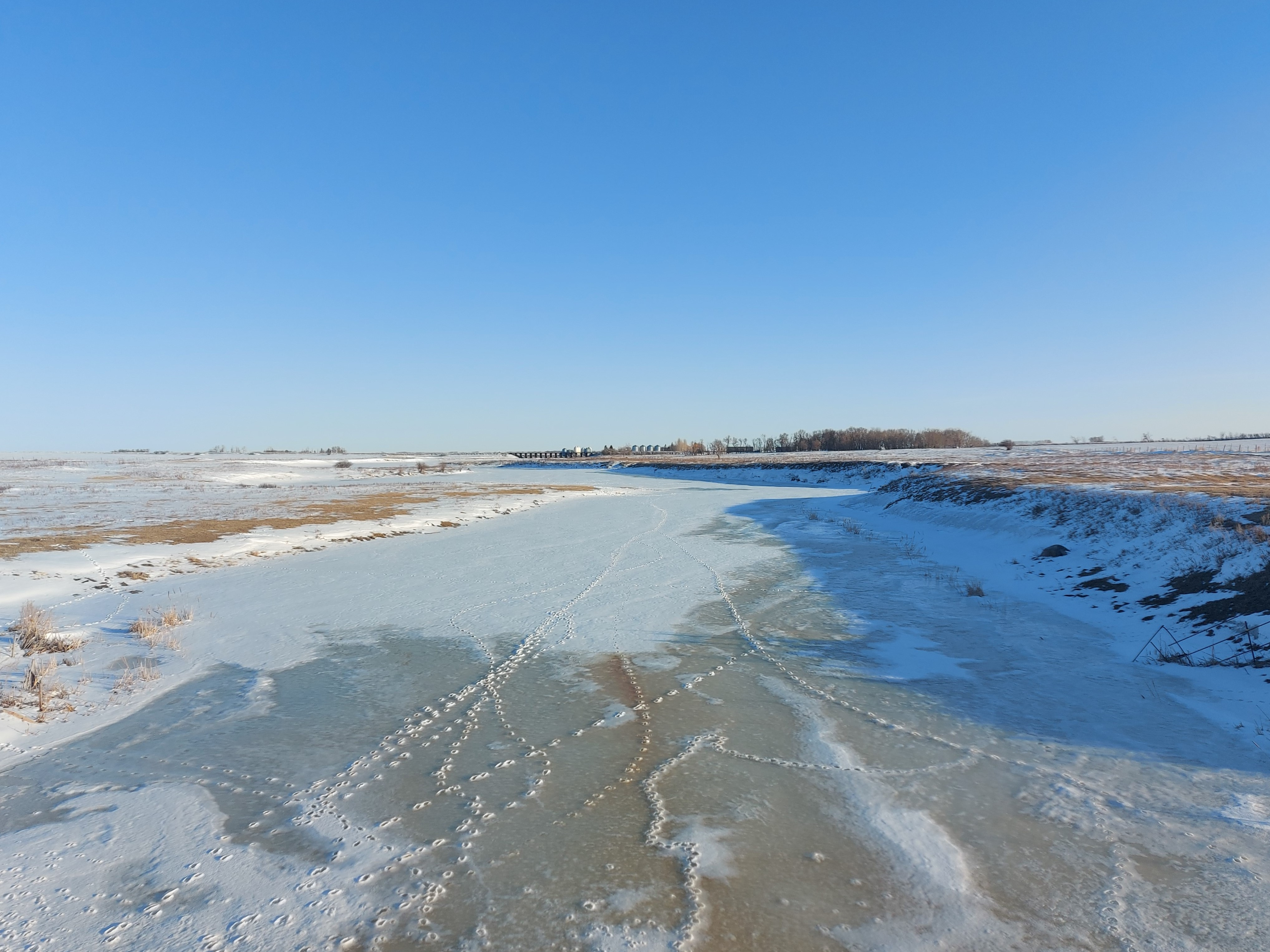
- Gainsborough Creek

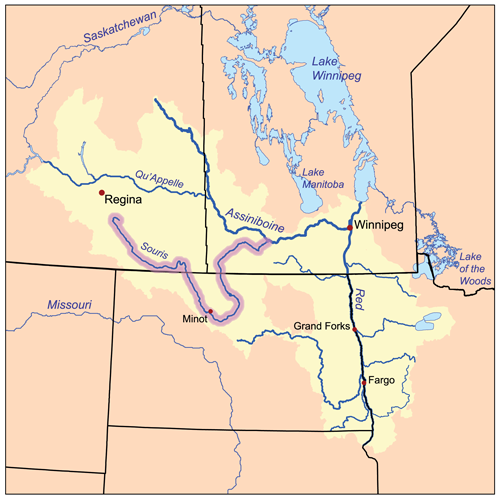
- The Red River drainage basin, with the Souris River highlighted

- Location of the river's mouth in Manitoba Gainsborough Creek (Canada)

Location
- Countries: Canada
- Provinces: Saskatchewan; Manitoba
- Towns: Gainsborough, Sk

Physical characteristics
- Source: Near Wawota
  - location: Saskatchewan
- Mouth: Souris River, upstream and south of Melita
  - location: Manitoba
  - coordinates: 49°10′21″N 101°01′54″W
- Discharge
  - location: Souris River

Basin features
- River system: Red River drainage basin

Gainsborough Creek is a tributary of the Souris River in south-eastern Saskatchewan and south-western Manitoba. It is in a region called the Prairie Pothole Region of North America, which extends throughout three Canadian provinces and five U.S. states. It is also within Palliser's Triangle and the Great Plains ecoregion.

Communities on or near the waterway are Gainsborough, Saskatchewan and Pierson, Manitoba.

In 2014, extended heavy rainfall in the south-eastern Saskatchewan and south-western Manitoba resulted in severe flash flooding across much of the region. Gainsborough residents were given a mandatory evacuation order and were taken to neighbouring communities. Provincial premier Brad Wall did an aerial survey of the flood area that allowed images and video of the flooded village to be recorded near the maximum height of the waters.

== Course ==
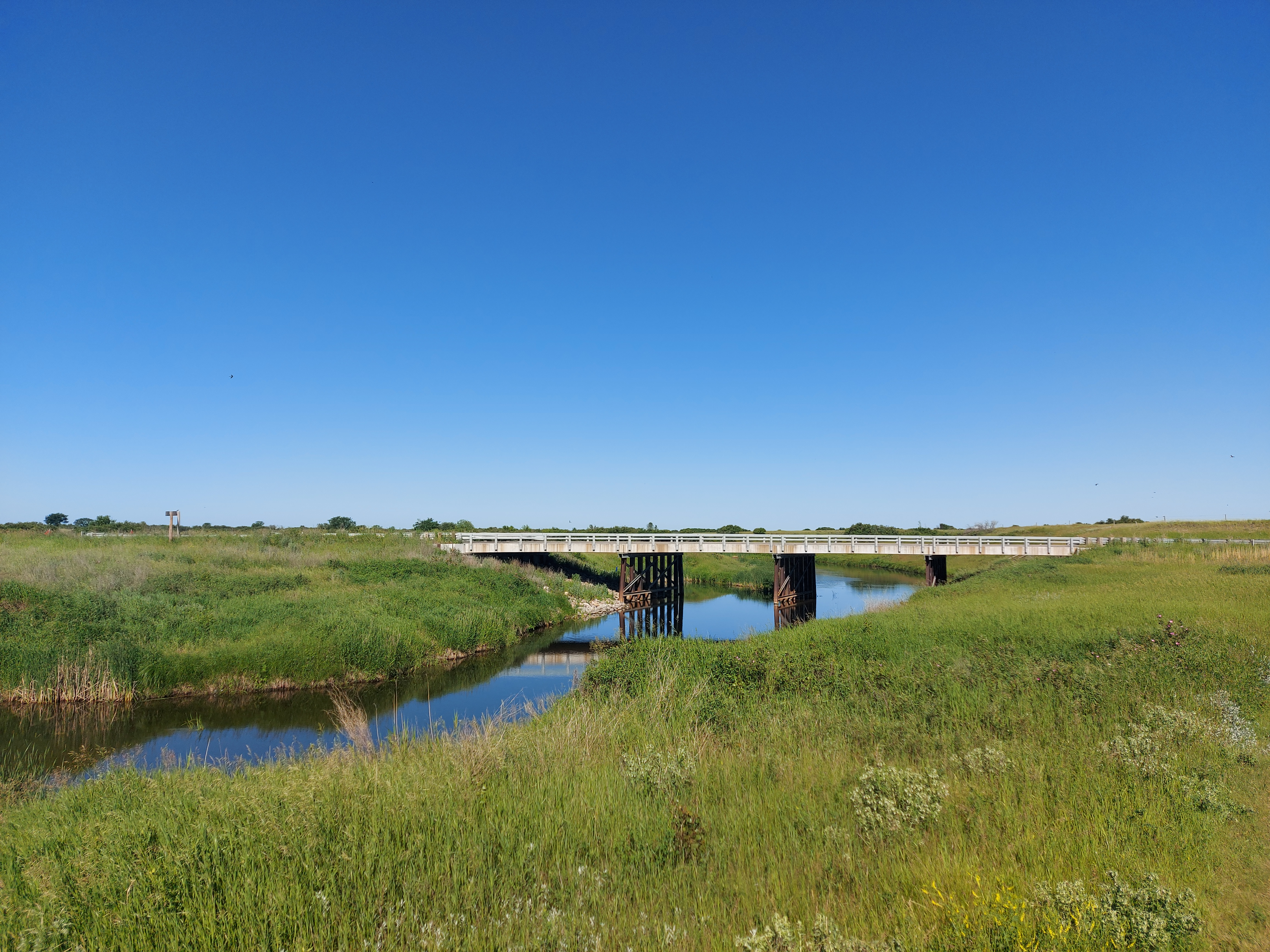
Gainsborough Creek passing under Manitoba's Provincial Road 256

The source of the Gainsborough Creek is between Wawota and Fairlight, Saskatchewan, just north of Highway 48. From its source, it heads south-east towards Fairlight where it crosses Highway 48 then Highway 8. Once past Highway 8, it heads south past Ryerson towards Highway 600, at which point, the river heads due south. It follows 600, paralleling two other rivers, Lightning Creek (a tributary of Antler River and Graham Creek (a tributary of the Souris River) and crosses Highway 13 west of Antler. After Highway 13, it continues south through Bellegarde, on to Highway 361, which it crosses between Fertile and Storthoaks. It continues southward until it comes up to Highway 18 and the village of Gainsborough at which point it starts to head east into Manitoba. After crossing the Road 251 south of Pierson, it heads north-east where it joins up with the Souris River just downstream from where the Antler River meets the Souris, near the junction of Highway 83 and Highway 3.

== See also ==
- List of rivers of Manitoba
- List of rivers of Saskatchewan
- Hudson Bay drainage basin
