= Saskatchewan Highway 361 =

Provincial highway in Saskatchewan, Canada

Highway 361

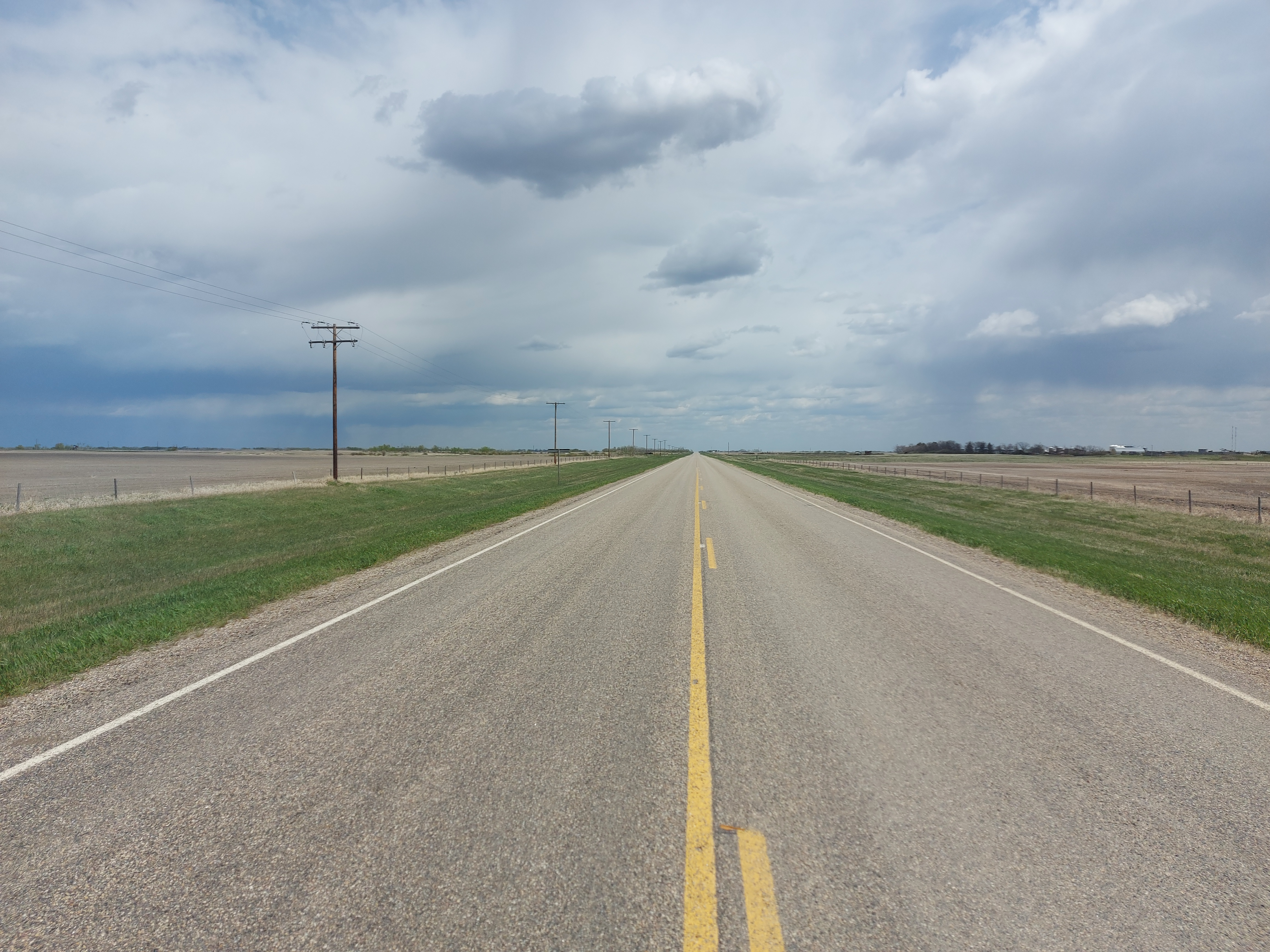
- Highway 361

Route information
- Maintained by Ministry of Highways and Infrastructure
- Length: 120.5 km (74.9 mi)

Major junctions
- West end: Highway 47 / Highway 702 near Cullen
- Highway 9 north Alameda; Highway 8 near Storthoaks
- East end: PR 345 at the Manitoba border near Fertile

Location
- Country: Canada
- Province: Saskatchewan
- Rural municipalities: Benson, Browning, Moose Creek, Reciprocity, Storthoaks

Highway system
- Provincial highways in Saskatchewan
← Highway 358	→ Highway 362

Highway 361 is a provincial highway in the south-east region of the Canadian province of Saskatchewan. It runs from the Manitoba border just east of Fertile, where it continues eastward as Provincial Road 345, to the junction between Highways 47 and 702 just west of Cullen. It is about 121 kilometres (75 mi) long.

Highway 361 passes near the communities of Fertile, Storthoaks, Nottingham, Alida, Auburnton, Douglaston, Lampman, Luxton, and Cullen. It connects with Highways 600, 8, 318, 601, 603, 9 (Saskota Flyway), 604, and 605.

== Route description ==
Hwy 361 begins in the Rural Municipality of Benson No. 35 at the junction between Hwy 47 and Hwy 702 just west of Cullen, with the road continuing as westbound Hwy 702 towards Midale. It heads west as a paved two-lane highway, traveling just to north of Cullen (connected via Range Road 2030) and just to the south of Woodley (connected via Range Road 2074) as it enters the Rural Municipality of Browning No. 34. The highway enters the town of Lampman shortly thereafter, becoming concurrent with northbound Hwy 605 as the pair cross over Canadian National Railway's Lampman subdivision and travel through neighborhoods in the southern part of town along Corrigan Road. After Hwy 605 splits off and heads north, Hwy 361 continues east through farmland, passing just to south of Browning (connected via Range Road 2054) before having a short concurrency with southbound Hwy 604 and entering the Rural Municipality of Moose Creek No. 33.

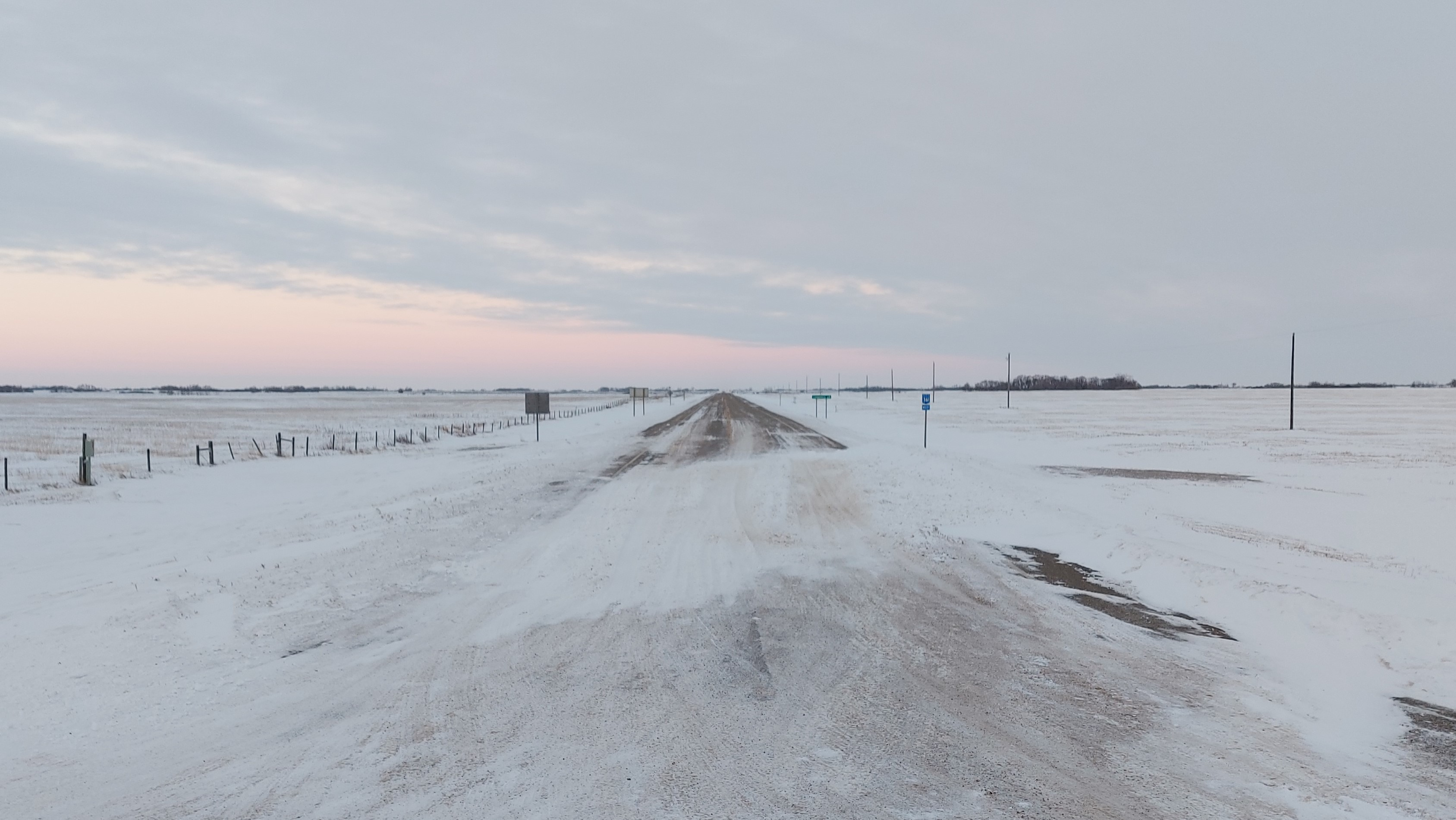
Highway 361 at the junction with Highway 9, facing west

Hwy 361 now shares a concurrency with northbound Hwy 9 (Saskota Flyway) for a couple kilometres before heading eastward, with its pavement transitioning to gravel as it crosses a bridge over Moose Mountain Creek / Grant Devine Reservoir on its way to the hamlet of Auburnton, where it has an intersection with Hwy 603 and crosses over Auburnton Creek. The highway traverses a switchback as it enters the Rural Municipality of Reciprocity No. 32, becoming concurrent with Hwy 601 northbound as the pair travels to the south of Cantal (connected via Cantal Road (Range Road 1340)) and cross the Antler River on their way to the village of Alida, becoming paved as they travel through the community. When Hwy 601 splits off and heads north, Hwy 361 makes a sudden sharp turn to the south, coming to an intersection with the north end of Hwy 318. Turning east again here, the pavement turns back to gravel as it passes along the south side of Nottingham (accessed via Range Road 1325) on its way to cross into the Rural Municipality of Storthoaks No. 31 and almost immediately have an intersection with Hwy 8. The highway becomes paved again for a short distance as it crosses over Lightning Creek and travels along the southern edge of the village of Storthoaks (accessed via W 6th Street and Range Road 1313) before transitioning back to gravel as it parallels a former railway line and heads towards the hamlet of Fertile, crossing Gainsborough Creek and having a concurrency with southbound Hwy 600 before reaching the Manitoba border via a switchback, continuing east towards Tilston, Manitoba as Manitoba Provincial Road 345 (PR 345).

== Major intersections ==
From west to east:

Rural municipality	Location	km	mi	Destinations	Notes
Benson No. 35		0.0	0.0	Highway 47 – Estevan, Stoughton Highway 702 west – Midale	Western terminus; eastern terminus of Hwy 702; road continues as Hwy 702 westbound; western end of paved section
Benson No. 35		3.3	2.1	Range Road 2030 – Cullen	
Benson No. 35		6.5	4.0	Range Road 2074 – Woodley, Forget	
Browning No. 34	Lampman	16.3	10.1	Highway 605 south – Bienfait	Western end of Hwy 605 concurrency
Browning No. 34	Lampman	17.9	11.1	Highway 605 north – Kisbey	Eastern end of Hwy 605 concurrency
Browning No. 34		26.1	16.2	Range Road 2054 – Browning	
Browning No. 34		37.5	23.3	Highway 604 north – Arcola	Western end of Hwy 604 concurrency
Browning No. 34		39.1	24.3	Highway 604 south – Frobisher	Eastern end of Hwy 604 concurrency
Moose Creek No. 33		44.0	27.3	Range Road 2035 – Douglaston	
Moose Creek No. 33		52.1	32.4	Highway 9 south (Saskota Flyway) – Alameda	Western end of Hwy 9 concurrency
Moose Creek No. 33		55.4	34.4	Highway 9 north (Saskota Flyway) – Carlyle	Eastern end of Hwy 9 concurrency; eastern end of paved section
Moose Creek No. 33		62.0	38.5	Bridge over Grant Devine Reservoir / Moose Mountain Creek	
Moose Creek No. 33	Auburnton	70.0	43.5	Highway 603 – Manor, Glen Ewen	
Moose Creek No. 33	Auburnton	70.6	43.9	Bridge over Auburnton Creek	
Reciprocity No. 32		79.0	49.1	Highway 601 south – Glen Ewen	
Reciprocity No. 32		80.6	50.1	Cantal Road (Range Road 1340) – Cantal	
Reciprocity No. 32		80.8– 80.9	50.2– 50.3	Bridge over the Antler River	
Reciprocity No. 32		84.2	52.3	Western end of paved section	
Reciprocity No. 32	Alida	85.8	53.3	Highway 601 north – Wauchope	Eastern end of Hwy 601 concurrency
Reciprocity No. 32		86.5	53.7	Highway 318 south – Carnduff	Northern terminus of Hwy 318; eastern end of paved section
Reciprocity No. 32	Nottingham	96.4	59.9	Range Road 1325 – Nottingham	
Storthoaks No. 31		102.9	63.9	Highway 8 – Redvers, Carievale	Western end of paved section
Storthoaks No. 31		103.6	64.4	Bridge over Lightning Creek	
Storthoaks No. 31	Storthoaks	106.2	66.0	Range Road 1313 – Storthoaks	Eastern end of paved section
Storthoaks No. 31		112.3	69.8	Bridge over Gainsborough Creek	
Storthoaks No. 31	Fertile	116.1	72.1	Highway 600 north – Fertile, Antler	Western end of Hwy 600 concurrency
Storthoaks No. 31	Fertile	117.7	73.1	Highway 600 south – Gainsborough	Eastern end of Hwy 600 concurrency
Storthoaks No. 31		120.5	74.9	PR 345 east – Tilston	Continuation into Manitoba; eastern terminus
1.000 mi = 1.609 km; 1.000 km = 0.621 mi: Concurrency terminus

== See also ==
- Transportation in Saskatchewan
- Roads in Saskatchewan
