= Alida, Saskatchewan =

Village in Saskatchewan, Canada

Alida
- Village
- Village of Alida
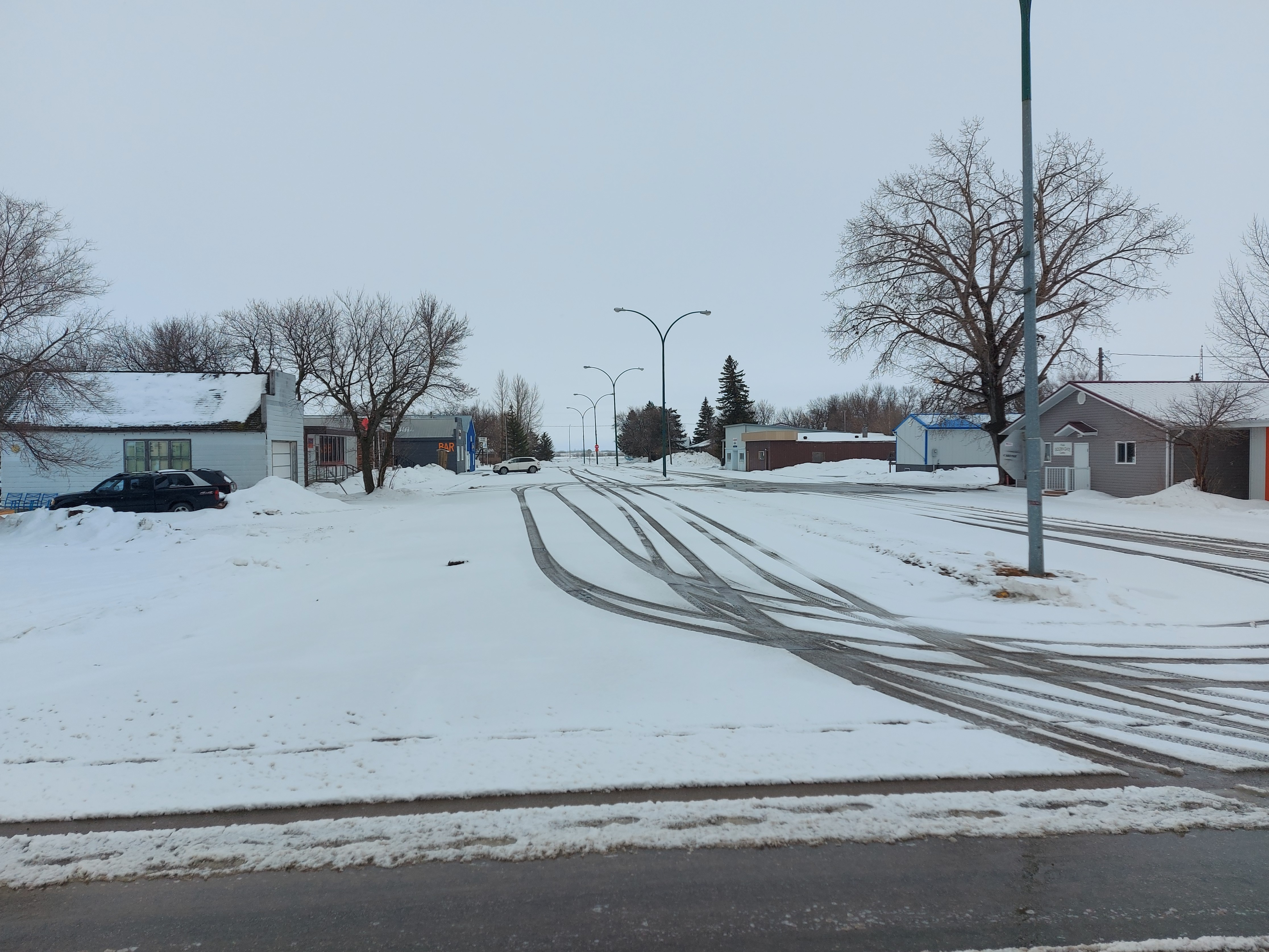
- Main Street

- Flag

- Location in Saskatchewan Alida (Canada)
- Coordinates: 49°23′20″N 101°52′27″W
- Country: Canada
- Province: Saskatchewan
- Region: South-east
- Rural Municipality: Reciprocity
- Post office Founded: December 1, 1913

Government
  - Type: Municipal
  - Governing body: Alida Village Council
  - Mayor: Timothy Cowan
  - Administrator: Kathy Anthony
  - MP: Steven Bonk
  - MLA: Daryl Harrison

Area (2021)
  - Total: 0.38 km^{2} (0.15 sq mi)

Population (2021)
  - Total: 103
  - Density: 223.9/km^{2} (580/sq mi)
- Time zone: UTC−06:00 (CTS)
- Postal code: S0C 0B0
- Area code: 306
- Highways: Highway 318 / Highway 361 / Highway 601

Alida (pronounced /əˈliːdə/ ə-LEE-də) (2021 population: 103) is a village in the Canadian province of Saskatchewan within the Rural Municipality of Reciprocity No. 32 and Census Division No. 1. The village is approximately 85 km (53 mi) east of the city of Estevan. Farming and oil are the major local industries. Several ghost towns are in the vicinity, including Nottingham to the east, Auburnton, to the west, and Cantal to the north-west. With the investment of oil and other industries, the area continues to grow.

== History ==
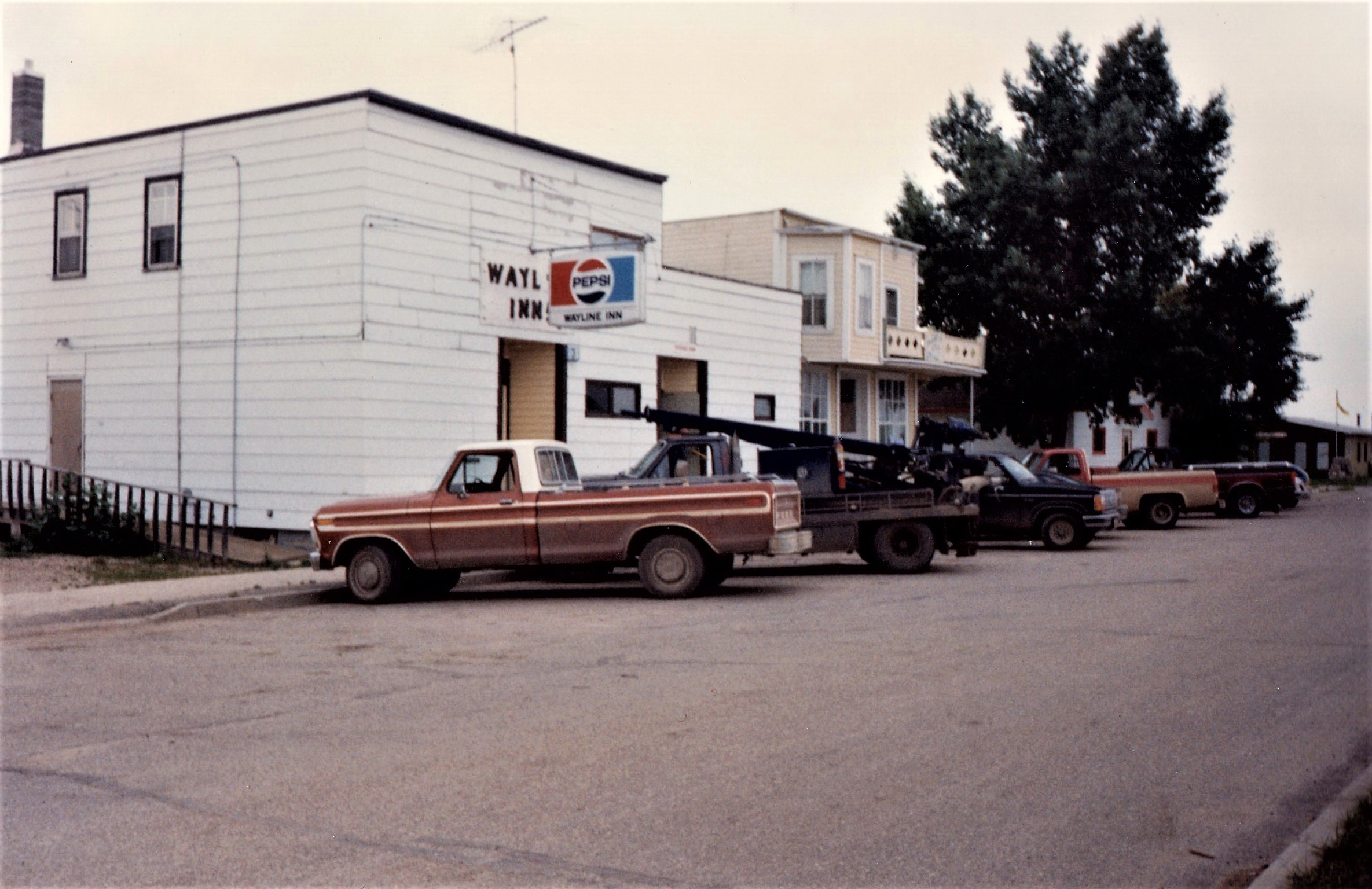
Hotel and Lukes Store, circa 1965

Alida was founded as a Canadian Pacific Railway station in the late 19th century, and it was named for Dame Alida Brittain. The local area was settled by immigrants from Europe, and other parts of North America. Alida incorporated as a village on February 19, 1926.

The rail line was closed in 1976 when a spring storm washed out the rail bridge near Lauder, Manitoba, at the beginning of the line. The economic viability of the line had been in question for some time, so the bridge was never repaired. Track was removed beginning in 1978.

The Post Office opened on December 1, 1913 and the first postmaster was Eugene Lemieux and served from 1913 to 1927.

== Transportation ==
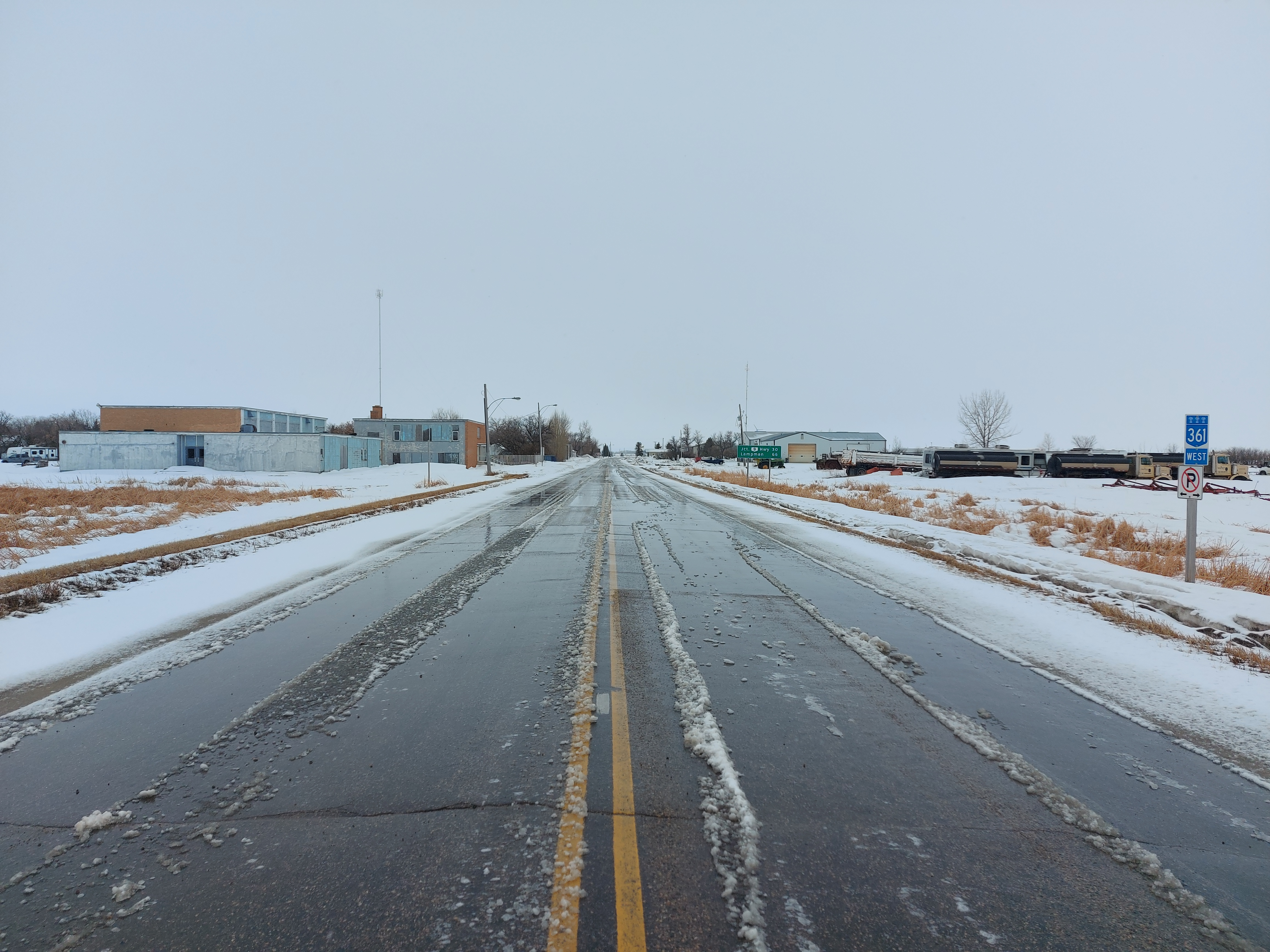
Highway 361 through Alida

Alida is at the cross-roads of three highways, Highway 361, Highway 318, and Highway 601. Located 2 nautical miles (3.7 km; 2.3 mi) east-northeast of Alida is the Alida/Cowan Farm Private Aerodrome.

== Demographics ==
Population history (1931–2021)
Year	Pop.	±%
1931	104	—
1941	116	+11.5%
1951	106	−8.6%
1956	168	+58.5%
1961	241	+43.5%
1966	297	+23.2%
1971	230	−22.6%
1976	163	−29.1%
1981	169	+3.7%
1986	188	+11.2%
1991	179	−4.8%
1996	158	−11.7%
2001	117	−25.9%
2006	106	−9.4%
2011	131	+23.6%
2016	120	−8.4%
2021	103	−14.2%
Source: Statistics Canada via Saskatchewan Bureau of Statistics

In the 2021 Canadian census conducted by Statistics Canada, Alida had a population of 103 living in 53 of its 74 total private dwellings, a change of −14.2% from its 2016 population of 120. With a land area of 0.38 km^{2} (0.15 sq mi), it had a population density of 271.1/km^{2} (702.0/sq mi) in 2021.

In the 2016 Canadian census, Alida recorded a population of 120 living in 63 of its 68 total private dwellings, a −9.2% change from its 2011 population of 131. With a land area of 0.38 km^{2} (0.15 sq mi), it had a population density of 278.4/km^{2} (721.0/sq mi) in 2016.

== Sports and recreation ==
Alida has a skating/curling rink. In 2014, the original ice rink flooded and was deemed too expensive to repair. It was torn down in 2015 and funds were raised for a new one. It was completed by 2017. The Alida Wrecks hockey team play there.

Alida holds annual curling bonspiels including a women's bonspiel and a farmers / oilmen's bonspiel. Along with this Alida hosts an annual recreational hockey tournament in which the local Alida Wrecks as well as teams from the surrounding communities compete.

There is an annual Alida sports day which features an annual softball (slow pitch) tournament, food and drinks, and live music/entertainment. This event often takes place at the start of June.

== Education ==
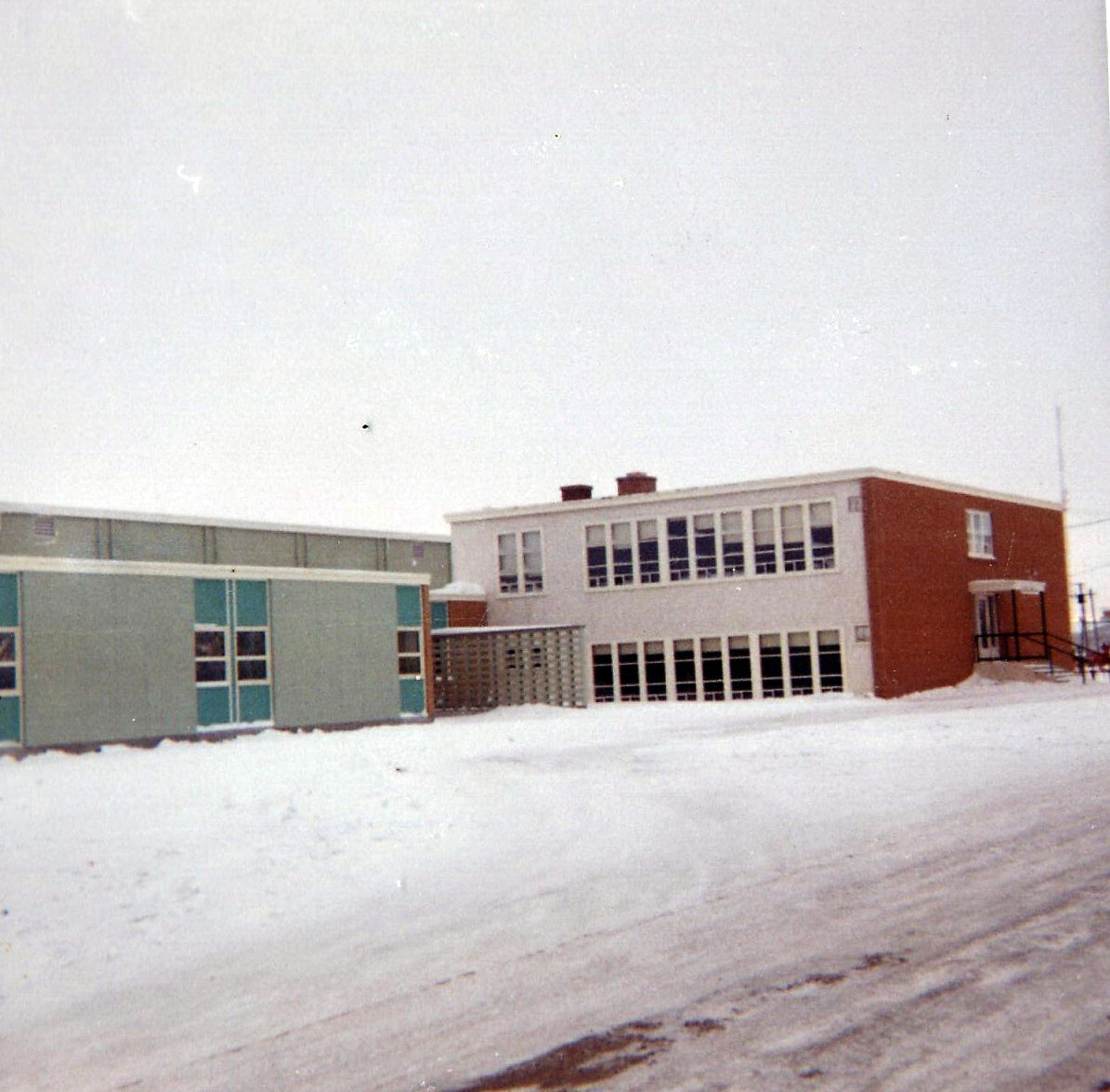
Alida School, circa 1965

The local school closed down in 2005, and students are bused to schools in Carnduff, Oxbow, or Redvers. The School has since been used as a private residence.

== Notable people ==
- Daryl Harrison - Saskatchewan Party member of the Legislative Assembly of Saskatchewan for the constituency of Cannington and Agriculture Minister of Saskatchewan.
- Dan D'Autremont - Saskatchewan Party former member of the Legislative Assembly of Saskatchewan for the constituency of Cannington and forming member of the Saskatchewan Party. He served as MLA of Cannington from 1991-2020.

== See also ==
- List of communities in Saskatchewan
- Block settlement
- List of villages in Saskatchewan
