= Nottingham, Saskatchewan =

Community in Saskatchewan, Canada

Nottingham
- Unincorporated community
- Location of Nottingham in Saskatchewan Nottingham (Canada)
- Coordinates: 49.385°N 101.717°W
- Country: Canada
- Province: Saskatchewan
- Region: Southeast
- Rural Municipality: Reciprocity

Government
  - Type: Municipal
  - Governing body: Rural Municipality of Reciprocity
  - MP: Robert Kitchen
  - MLA: Dan D'Autremont
- Time zone: UTC-6 (Central)
- Area code: 306
- Highways: Highway 361

Nottingham is an unincorporated community with in the Rural Municipality of Reciprocity No. 32, Saskatchewan, Canada. The community is located between Storthoaks, and Alida, Saskatchewan on Highway 361. The community once had a post office, general store and two Saskatchewan Wheat Pool elevators.

A dilapidated community hall still exists there and was used by members of the local communities and municipality.

== See also ==
- List of communities in Saskatchewan
