= Rural Municipality of Reciprocity No. 32 =

Rural municipality in Saskatchewan, Canada

Reciprocity No. 32
- Rural municipality
- Rural Municipality of Reciprocity No. 32
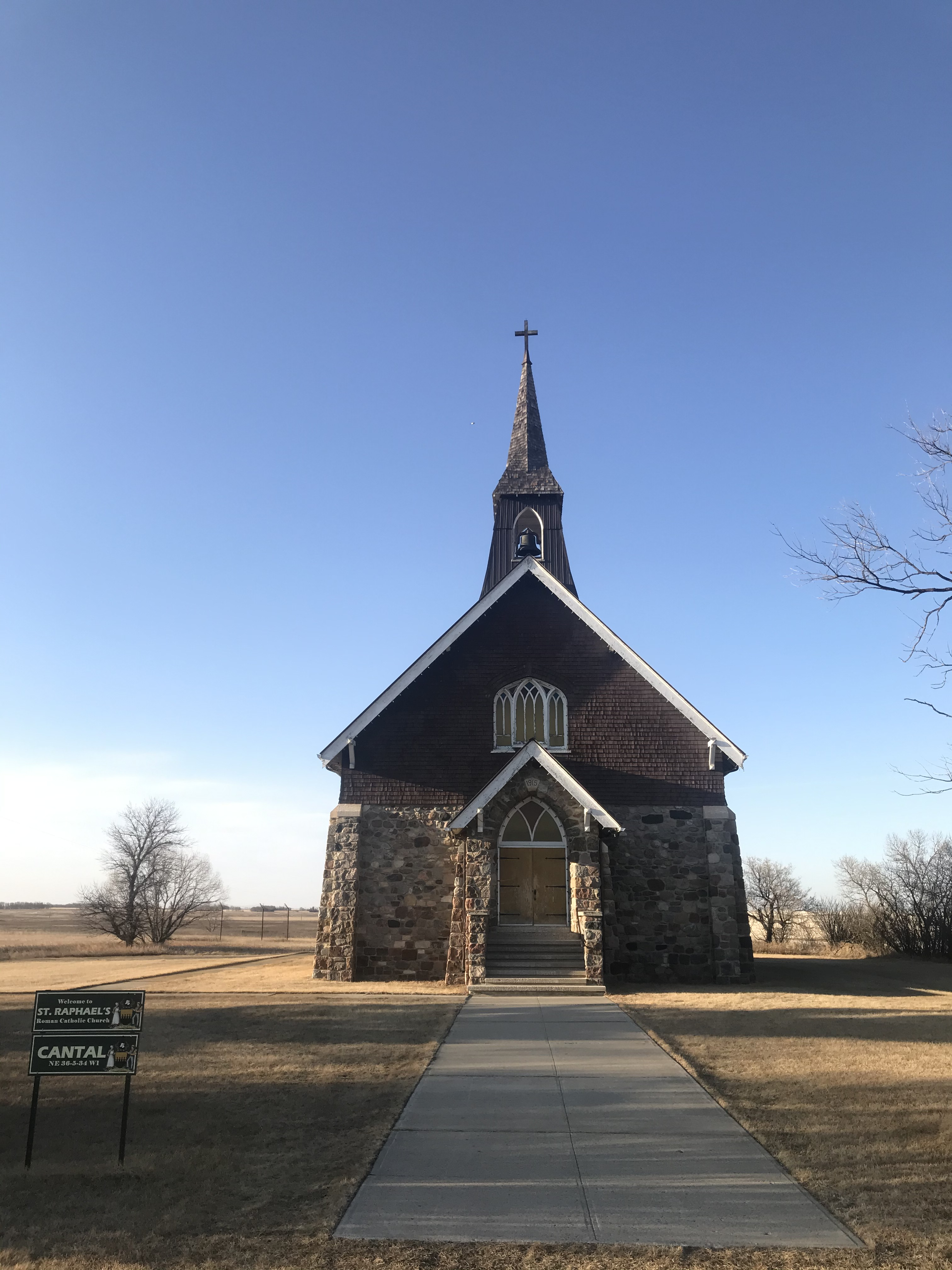
- St. Raphael Church in Cantal

- Location of the RM of Reciprocity No. 32 in Saskatchewan
- Coordinates: 49.413°N 101.873°W
- Country: Canada
- Province: Saskatchewan
- Census division: 1
- SARM division: 1
- Federal riding: Souris—Moose Mountain
- Provincial riding: Cannington
- Formed: December 11, 1911

Government
  - Reeve: Alan Arthur
  - Governing body: RM of Reciprocity No. 32 Council
  - Administrator: Marilyn J. Larsen
  - Office location: Alida

Area (2021)
  - Land: 707.95 km^{2} (273.34 sq mi)

Population (2021)
  - Total: 351
  - Density: 0.5/km^{2} (1.3/sq mi)
- Time zone: CST
  - Summer (DST): CST
- Postal code: S0C 0B0
- Area codes: 306 and 639
- Website: Official website

The Rural Municipality of Reciprocity No. 32 (2016 population: 344) is a rural municipality (RM) in the Canadian province of Saskatchewan within Census Division No. 1 and SARM Division No. 1. It is located in the southeast portion of the province.

== Etymology ==
Reciprocity No. 32 is named after the Reciprocity Treaty, a free trade agreement which was a controversial election issue in 1911. The treaty was defeated, along with Wilfrid Laurier's government, in the same year. The name was suggested by J. Adolph Lemay, the R.M. secretary of the time.

== History ==
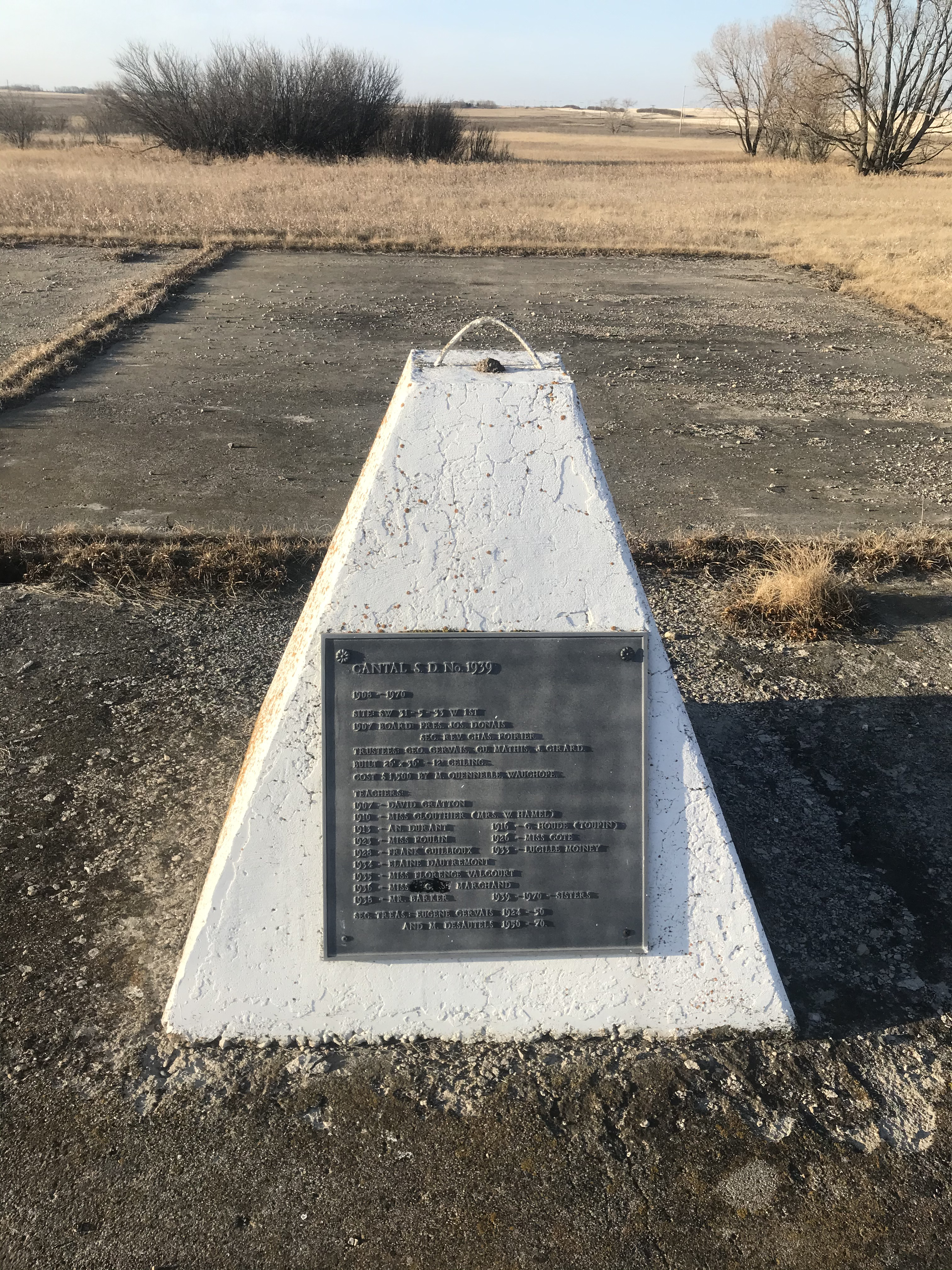
Site of the school in Cantal

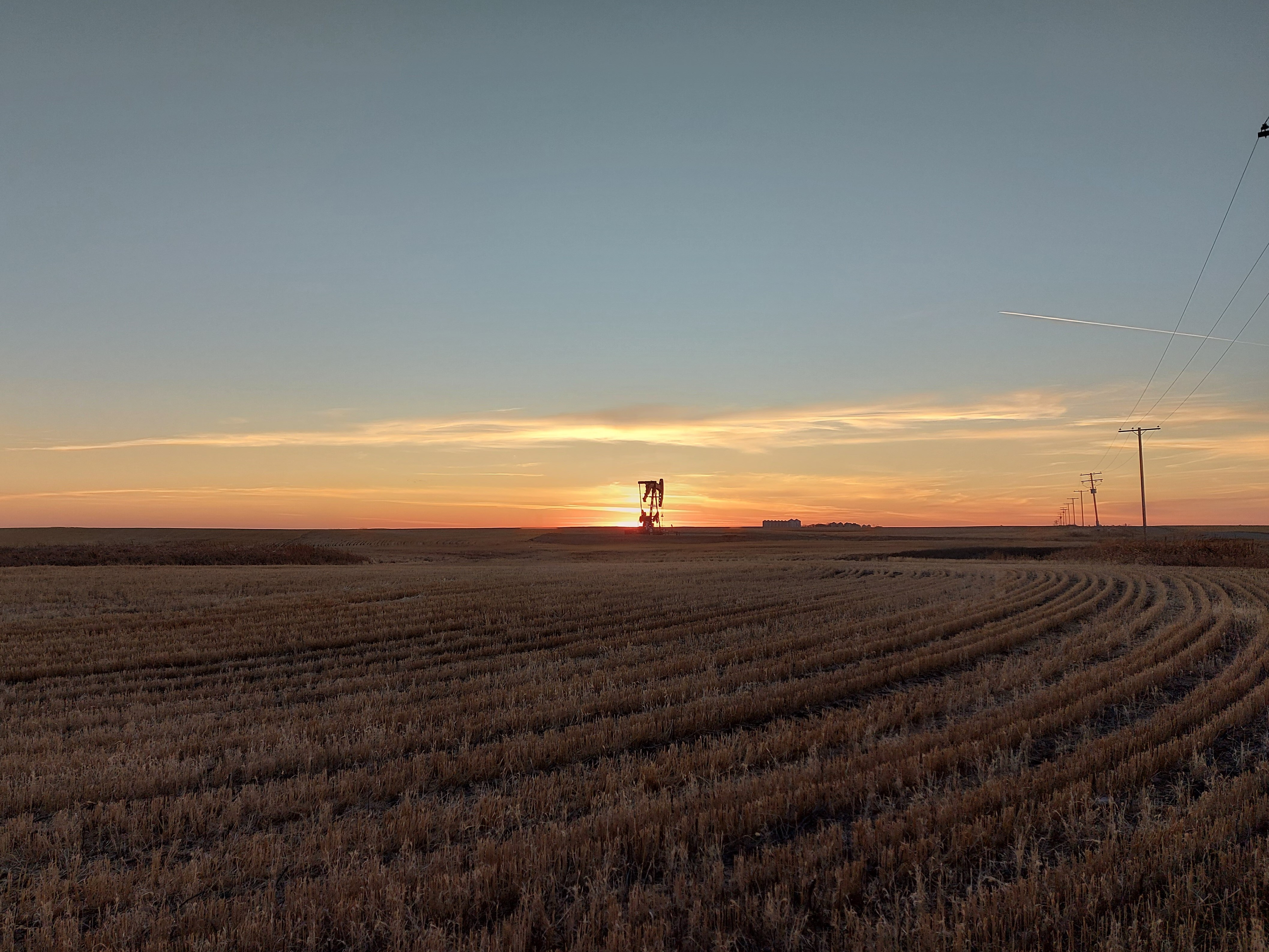
A pump jack in a field at sunset

The RM of Reciprocity No. 32 incorporated as a rural municipality on December 11, 1911.

== Geography ==
The western edge of the RM runs along the 102nd meridian west.

=== Communities and localities ===
The following urban municipalities are surrounded by the RM:

Villages

- Alida

The following unincorporated communities are within the RM:

Localities

- Cantal
- Nottingham

=== Rivers ===
- Antler River
  - Auburnton Creek
  - Lightning Creek (at the extreme north-east corner of the RM)

== Transportation ==
- Highway 8 (at the north-east corner of the RM)
- Highway 601
- Highway 361
- Highway 318
- Alida/Cowan Farm Private Aerodrome

== Demographics ==
Population history (1981–2016)
Year	Pop.	±%
1981	608	—
1986	580	−4.6%
1991	497	−14.3%
1996	475	−4.4%
2001	416	−12.4%
2006	352	−15.4%
2011	386	+9.7%
2016	344	−10.9%
2021	351	+2.0%
Source: Statistics Canada via Saskatchewan Bureau of Statistics

In the 2021 Census of Population conducted by Statistics Canada, the RM of Reciprocity No. 32 had a population of 351 living in 141 of its 163 total private dwellings, a change of 2% from its 2016 population of 344. With a land area of 707.95 km^{2} (273.34 sq mi), it had a population density of 0.5/km^{2} (1.3/sq mi) in 2021.

In the 2016 Census of Population, the RM of Reciprocity No. 32 recorded a population of 344 living in 135 of its 145 total private dwellings, a −10.9% change from its 2011 population of 386. With a land area of 733.04 km^{2} (283.03 sq mi), it had a population density of 0.5/km^{2} (1.2/sq mi) in 2016.

== Economy ==
The RM's economy is based on agriculture and oil.

== Government ==
The RM of Reciprocity No. 32 is governed by an elected municipal council and an appointed administrator that meets on the second Thursday of every month. The reeve of the RM is Alan Arthur while its administrator is Marilyn J. Larsen. The RM's office is located in Alida.

== See also ==
- List of rural municipalities in Saskatchewan
- List of communities in Saskatchewan
