= Rural Municipality of Storthoaks No. 31 =

Rural municipality in Saskatchewan, Canada

Storthoaks No. 31 Storkoaks No. 31 (1911–1912)
- Rural municipality
- Rural Municipality of Storthoaks No. 31
- Location of the RM of Storthoaks No. 31 in Saskatchewan
- Coordinates: 49.422°N 101.535°W
- Country: Canada
- Province: Saskatchewan
- Census division: 1
- SARM division: 1
- Federal riding: Souris—Moose Mountain
- Provincial riding: Cannington
- Formed: December 11, 1911
- Name change: March 15, 1912 (from RM of Storkoaks No. 31)

Government
  - Reeve: Brian Chicoine
  - Governing body: RM of Storthoaks No. 31 Council
  - Administrator: Elissa Henrion
  - Office location: Storthoaks

Area (2021)
  - Land: 551.21 km^{2} (212.82 sq mi)

Population (2021)
  - Total: 306
  - Density: 0.6/km^{2} (1.6/sq mi)
- Time zone: CST
  - Summer (DST): CST
- Postal code: S0C 2K0
- Area codes: 306 and 639

The Rural Municipality of Storthoaks No. 31 (2016 population: 292) is a rural municipality (RM) in the Canadian province of Saskatchewan within Census Division No. 1 and SARM Division No. 1.

== History ==
The RM of Storkoaks No. 31 was originally incorporated as a rural municipality on December 11, 1911. Its name was changed to the RM of Storthoaks No. 31 on March 15, 1912.

== Geography ==
=== Communities and localities ===
The following urban municipalities are surrounded by the RM.

Villages

- Storthoaks

The following unincorporated communities are within the RM.

Organized hamlets

- Bellegarde

Localities

- Fertile

== Demographics ==
Population history (1981–2016)
Year	Pop.	±%
1981	607	—
1986	568	−6.4%
1991	478	−15.8%
1996	462	−3.3%
2001	383	−17.1%
2006	312	−18.5%
2011	304	−2.6%
2016	292	−3.9%
2021	306	+4.8%
Source: Statistics Canada via Saskatchewan Bureau of Statistics

In the 2021 Census of Population conducted by Statistics Canada, the RM of Storthoaks No. 31 had a population of 306 living in 114 of its 131 total private dwellings, a change of 4.8% from its 2016 population of 292. With a land area of 551.21 km^{2} (212.82 sq mi), it had a population density of 0.6/km^{2} (1.4/sq mi) in 2021.

In the 2016 Census of Population, the RM of Storthoaks No. 31 recorded a population of 292 living in 112 of its 121 total private dwellings, a −3.9% change from its 2011 population of 304. With a land area of 584.16 km^{2} (225.55 sq mi), it had a population density of 0.5/km^{2} (1.3/sq mi) in 2016.

== Government ==
The RM of Storthoaks No. 31 is governed by an elected municipal council and an appointed administrator that meets on the second Monday of every month. The reeve of the RM is Brian Chicoine while its administrator is Elissa Henrion. The RM's office is located in Storthoaks.

== Transportation ==
Rail

- Estevan Section C.P.R. -- serves Lauder, Bernice, Bede, Broomhill, Tilston, Fertile, Storthoaks, Nottingham, Alida

Roads

- Highway 361—serves Storthoaks, Saskatchewan
- Highway 8—North south Highway to the west of Storthoaks, Saskatchewan
- Highway 600—North south section of the Highway to the east of Storthoaks, Saskatchewan
- Highway 361—East West Highway to the east of Storthoaks, Saskatchewan

== See also ==
- List of rural municipalities in Saskatchewan
