= Cantal, Saskatchewan =

Community in Saskatchewan, Canada

Cantal
- Unincorporated community Block settlement
- Location of Cantal in Saskatchewan Cantal (Canada)
- Coordinates: 49°26′02″N 101°56′06″W
- Country: Canada
- Province: Saskatchewan
- Region: Southeast
- Rural Municipality: Reciprocity

Government
  - Type: Municipal
  - Governing body: Rural Municipality of Reciprocity
  - MP: Robert Kitchen
  - MLA: Dan D'Autremont
- Time zone: UTC-6 (Central)
- Area code: 306

Cantal is an unincorporated community, within the Rural Municipality of Reciprocity No. 32, Saskatchewan, Canada. The community is located 4 km north of Highway 361 on Range Road 340, (49.433998, -101.934873) approximately 103 km east of the city of Estevan. Farming and oil are the major local industries.

== Gallery ==
A gallery of photos from Cantal, Saskatchewan

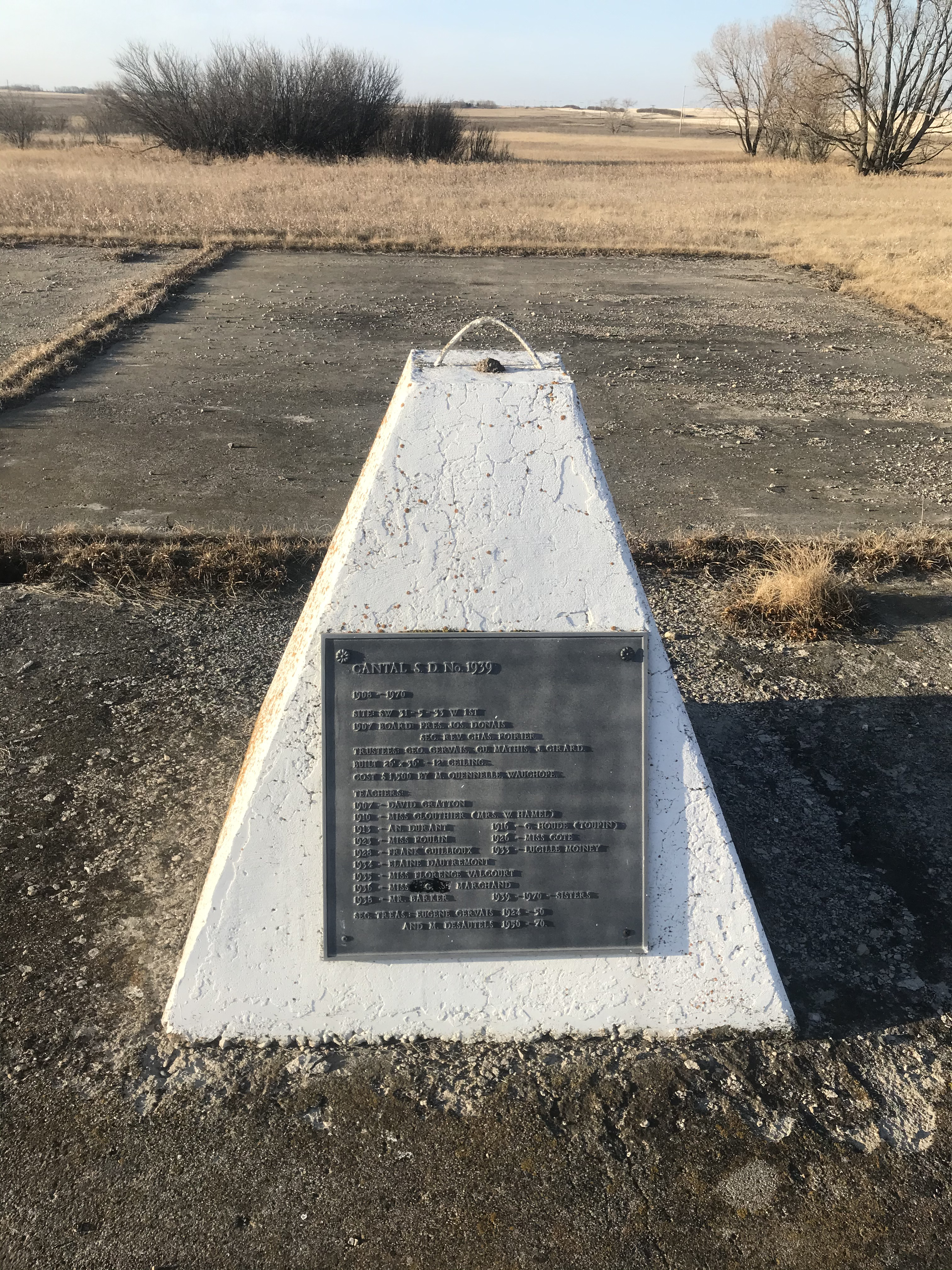
School site in Cantal, Saskatchewan

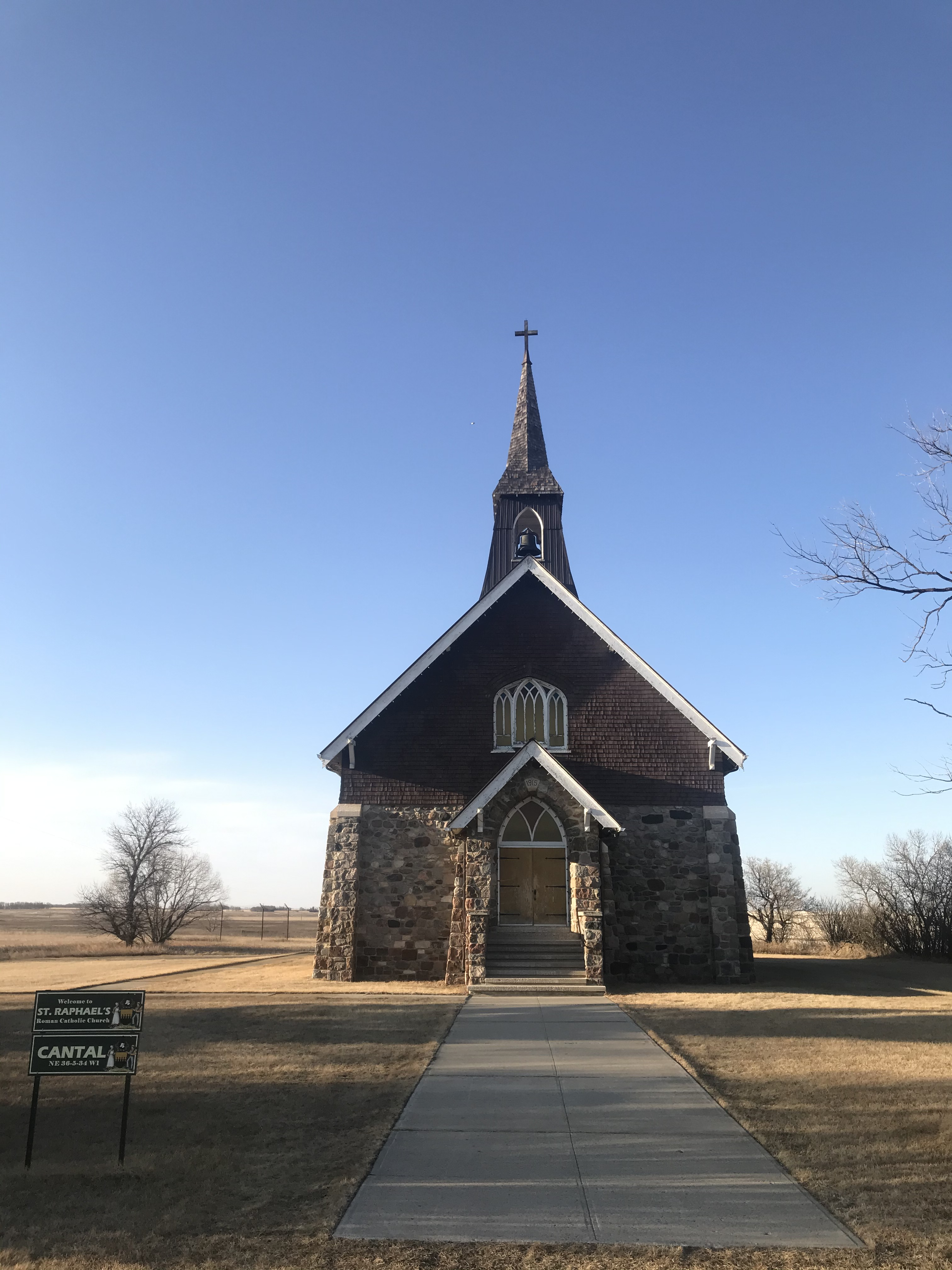
St. Raphael Church in Cantal, Saskatchewan

== See also ==
- List of communities in Saskatchewan
- Block settlement
