= Rural Municipality of Moose Creek No. 33 =

Rural municipality in Saskatchewan, Canada

Moose Creek No. 33
- Rural municipality
- Rural Municipality of Moose Creek No. 33
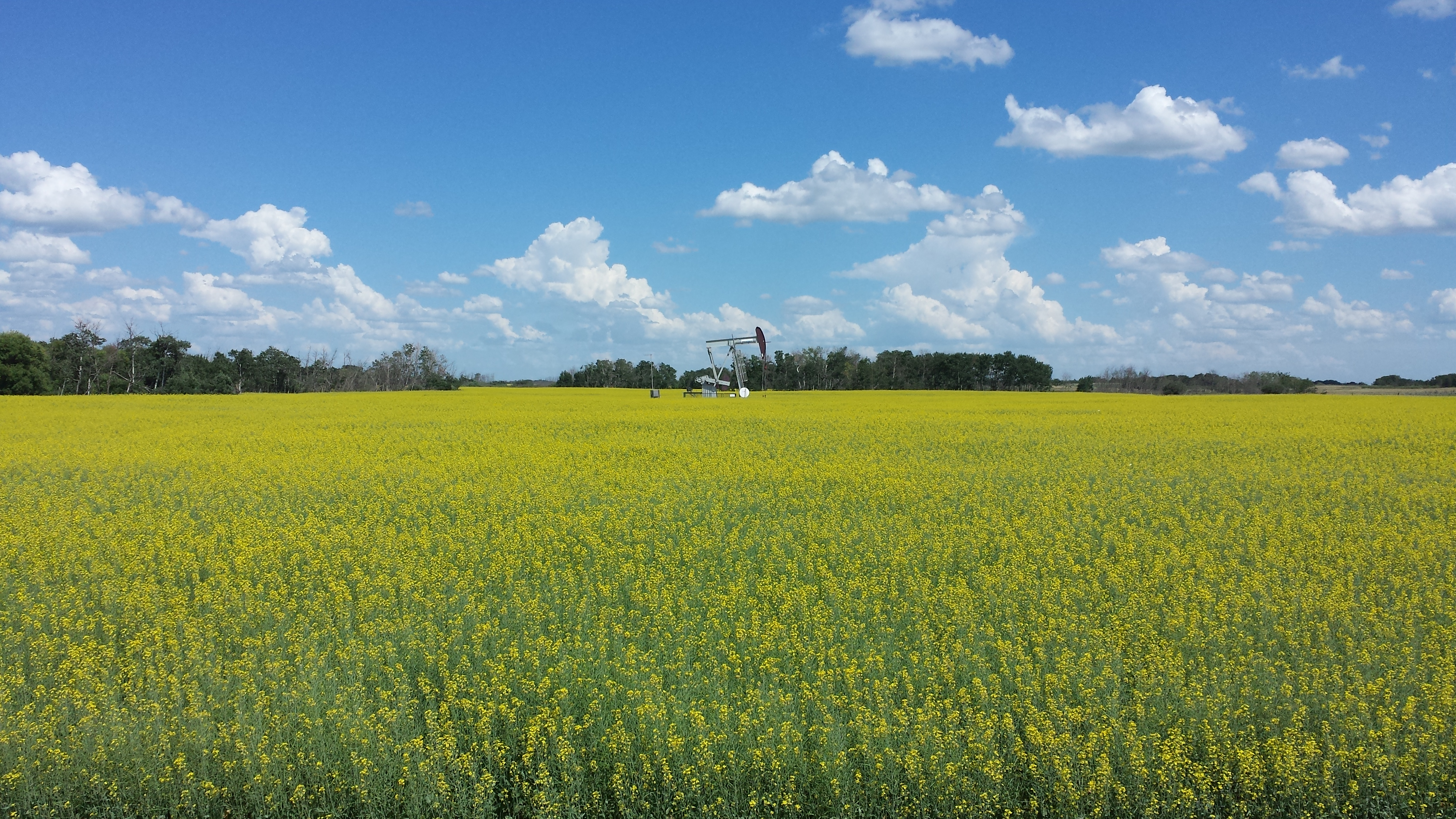
- Pumpjack in a canola field in the RM of Moose Creek

- Location of the RM of Moose Creek No. 33 in Saskatchewan
- Coordinates: 49.392°N 102.208°W
- Country: Canada
- Province: Saskatchewan
- Census division: 1
- SARM division: 1
- Federal riding: Souris—Moose Mountain
- Provincial riding: Cannington
- Formed: December 12, 1910

Government
  - Reeve: Howard Sloan
  - Governing body: RM of Moose Creek No. 33 Council
  - Administrator: Sentura Freitag
  - Office location: Alameda

Area (2021)
  - Land: 828.74 km^{2} (319.98 sq mi)

Population (2021)
  - Total: 306
  - Density: 0.4/km^{2} (1.0/sq mi)
- Time zone: CST
  - Summer (DST): CST
- Postal code: S0C 0A0
- Area codes: 306 and 639
- Website: Official website

The Rural Municipality of Moose Creek No. 33 (2016 population: 379) is a rural municipality (RM) in the Canadian province of Saskatchewan within Census Division No. 1 and SARM Division No. 1.

== History ==
The RM of Moose Creek No. 33 incorporated as a rural municipality on 12 December 1910.

=== Moose Creek United Church and Cemetery ===
Moose Creek United Church and Cemetery, also known as Moose Creek Methodist Church until 1925 when it joined the United Church, is an historical site located within the RM.

Constructed in 1916, the United Church is located approximately 10 kilometres (6.2 mi) south-west of Carlyle. The initial funding to build the church came from community donations and a $1,500 loan at 8% interest from John Hewitt. When he died in 1927, the balance of the loan was cancelled. The cemetery was established two years after the completion of the church, in 1918. The cemetery is the final resting place for many of the early settlers. The first wedding there was between Tom Cook and Isabel Wallace and was officiated by Reverend F.B. Ball

On 5 March 1991, the church and cemetery were designated a Municipal Heritage Resource and on 10 August, they were added to the Register for Canada's Historic Places.

The heritage value of the property also lies in the landscape. The Moose Creek United Church and Cemetery is situated on large well-groomed grounds, reflecting property's importance to the community. The borders are defined by a partial shelter belt, and the cemetery is further separated from the church grounds by a loosely-treed border and an ornate brick and iron gate.

==== Gallery ====
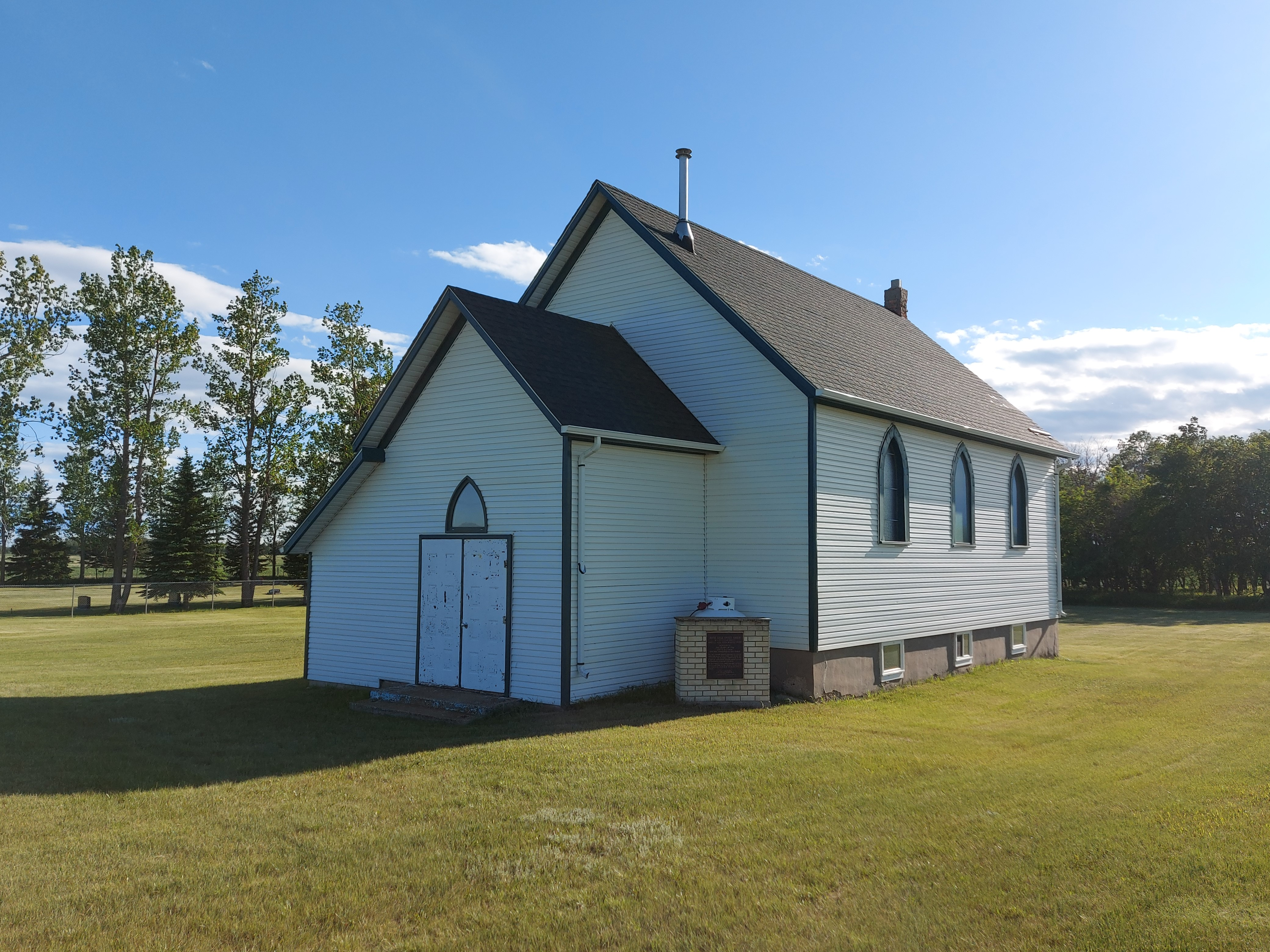
Moose Creek United Church

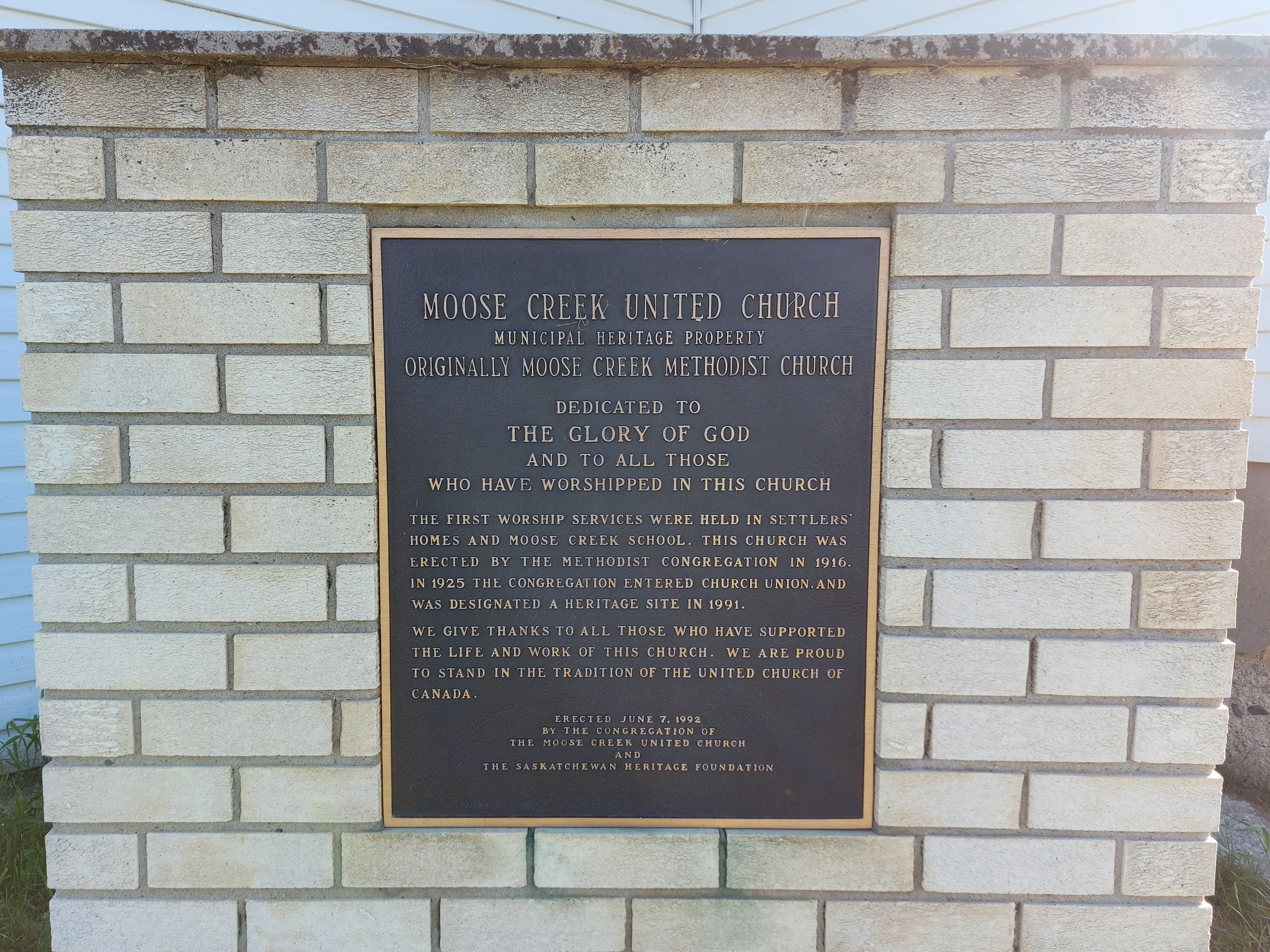
The plaque at Moose Creek United Church and Cemetery

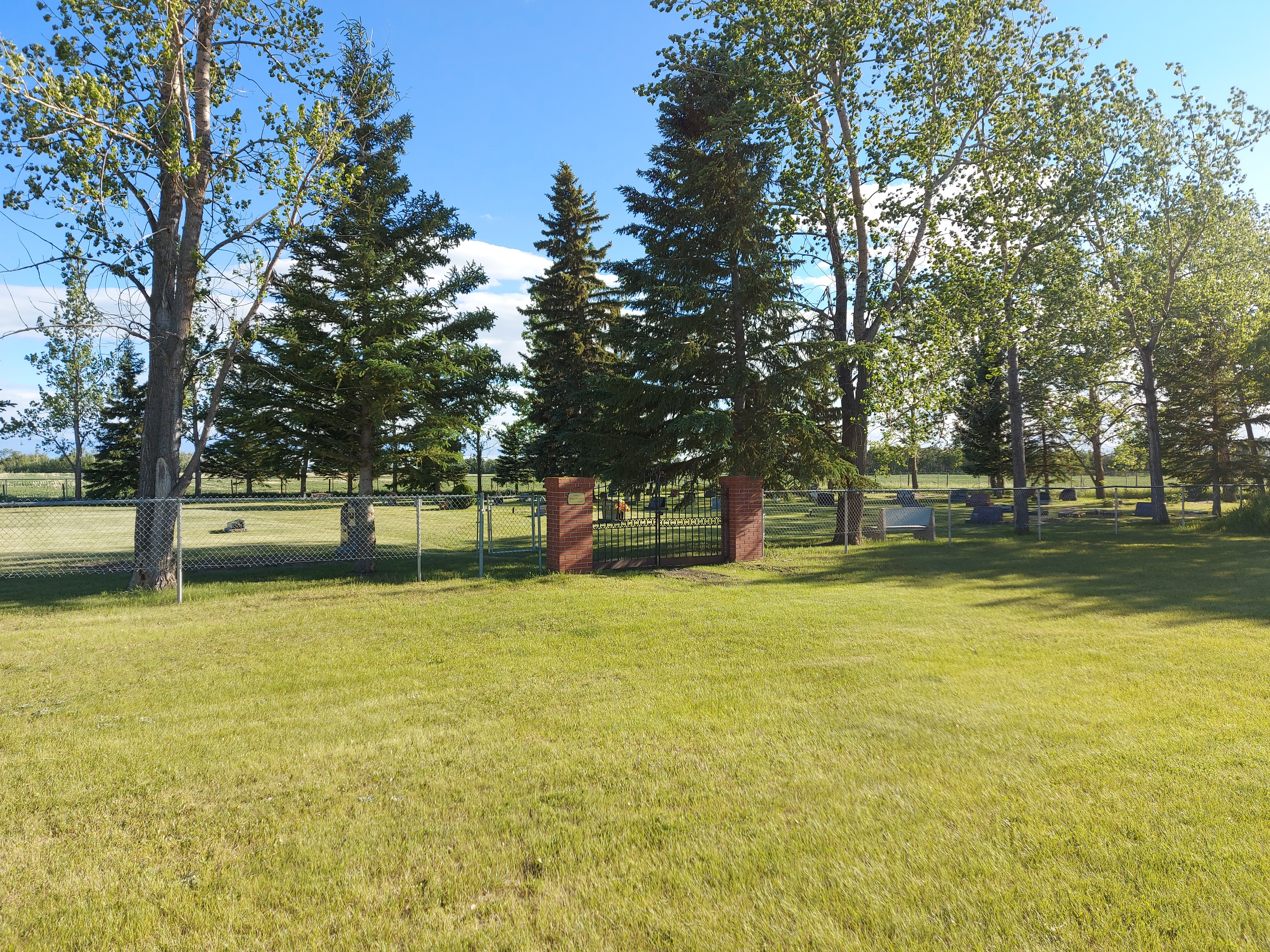
Moose Creek Cemetery

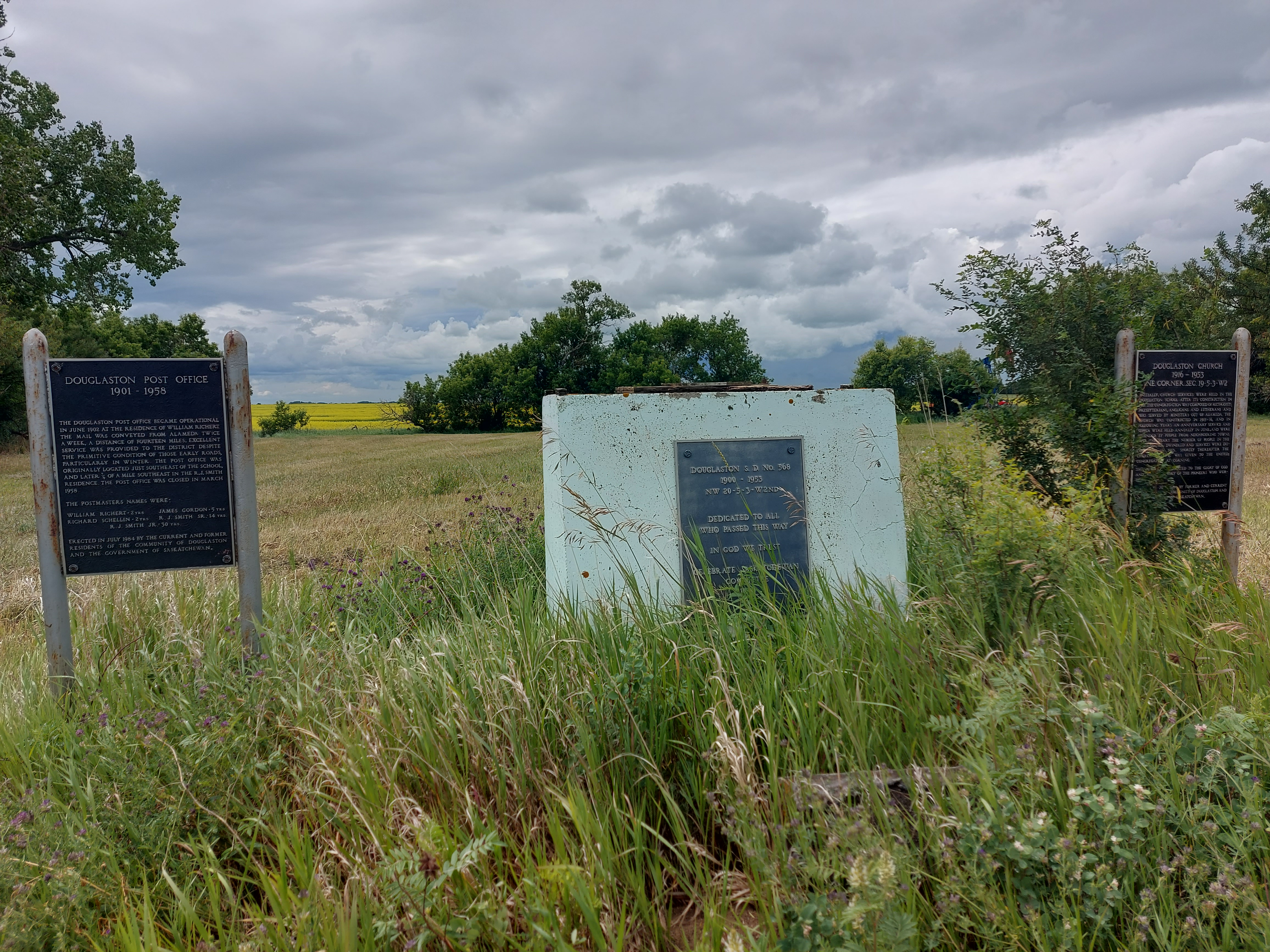
Plaque commemorating the former townsite of Douglaston

== Geography ==
=== Communities and localities ===
The following urban municipalities are surrounded by the RM.

Towns

- Alameda

The following unincorporated communities are within the RM.

Localities

- Auburnton
- Douglaston

== Demographics ==
Population history (1981–2016)
Year	Pop.	±%
1981	544	—
1986	500	−8.1%
1991	460	−8.0%
1996	416	−9.6%
2001	409	−1.7%
2006	365	−10.8%
2011	372	+1.9%
2016	379	+1.9%
2021	306	−19.3%
Source: Statistics Canada via Saskatchewan Bureau of Statistics

In the 2021 Census of Population conducted by Statistics Canada, the RM of Moose Creek No. 33 had a population of 306 living in 116 of its 136 total private dwellings, a change of −19.3% from its 2016 population of 379. With a land area of 828.74 km^{2} (319.98 sq mi), it had a population density of 0.4/km^{2} (1.0/sq mi) in 2021.

In the 2016 Census of Population, the RM of Moose Creek No. 33 recorded a population of 379 living in 132 of its 151 total private dwellings, a 1.9% change from its 2011 population of 372. With a land area of 842.03 km^{2} (325.11 sq mi), it had a population density of 0.5/km^{2} (1.2/sq mi) in 2016.

== Government ==
The RM of Moose Creek No. 33 is governed by an elected municipal council and an appointed administrator that meets on the second Wednesday of every month. The reeve of the RM is Howard Sloan while its administrator is Sentura Freitag. The RM's office is located in Alameda.

== See also ==
- List of historic places in rural municipalities of Saskatchewan
- List of historic places in Saskatchewan
- Lists of historic places in Canada
