= Auburnton =

Community in Saskatchewan, Canada

- Unincorporated community
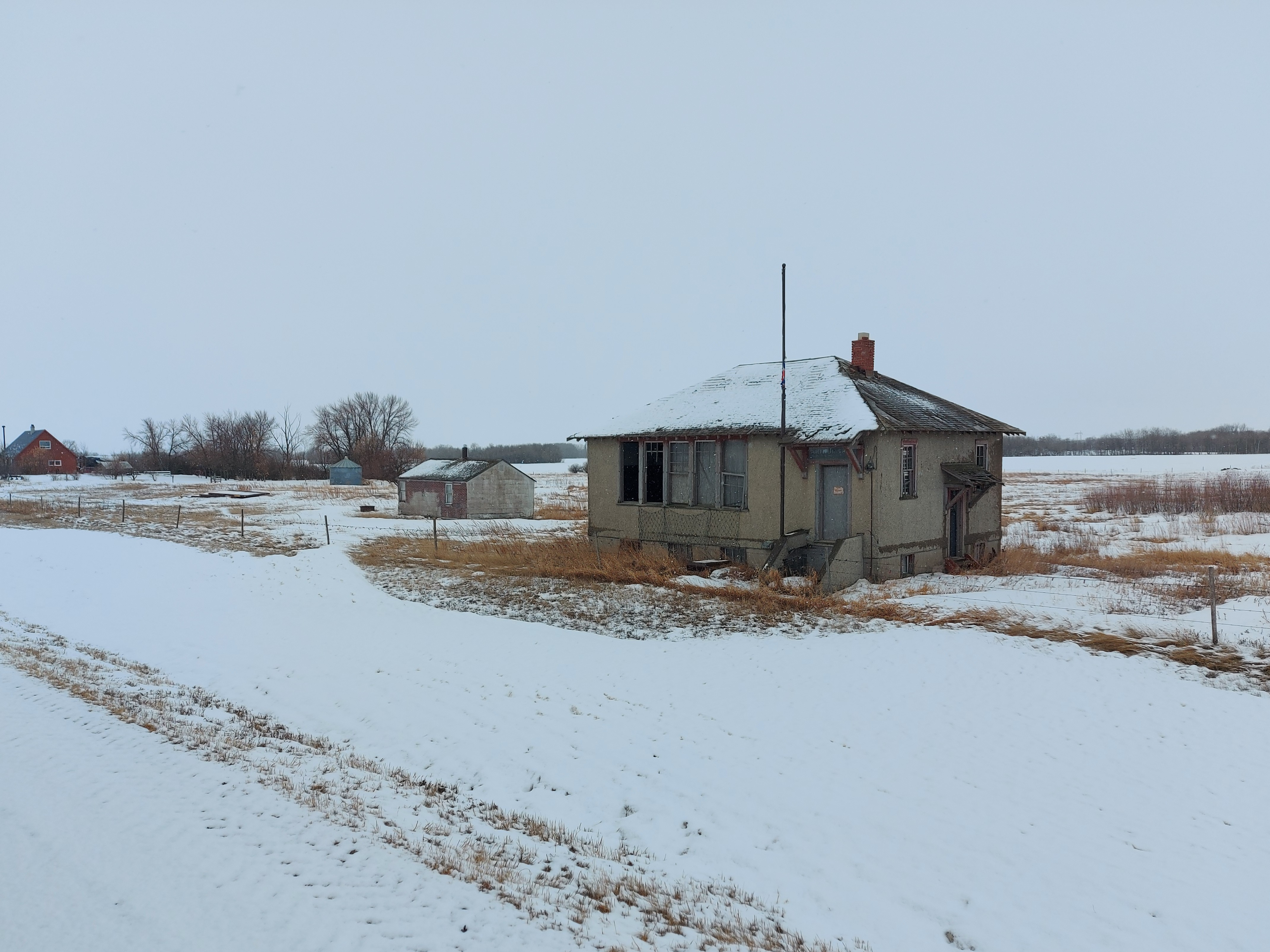
- Auburnton

- Location of Auburnton in Saskatchewan Auburnton (Canada)
- Coordinates: 49°24′23″N 102°04′25″W
- Country: Canada
- Province: Saskatchewan
- Region: South-east
- Rural Municipality: Moose Creek No. 33

Government
  - Type: Municipal
  - Governing body: Rural Municipality of MooseCreek
  - MP: Robert Kitchen
  - MLA: Daryl Harrison
- Time zone: UTC-6 (Central)
- Area code: 306
- Highways: Highway 361 / Highway 603

Auburnton is an unincorporated community and ghost town, within the Rural Municipality of Moose Creek No. 33, Saskatchewan, Canada, approximately 89.3 km east of the city of Estevan. Farming and oil are major local industries. The community is located at the junction of Highway 361 and Highway 603.

== See also ==
- List of communities in Saskatchewan
- List of ghost towns in Saskatchewan
