= Rural Municipality of Mount Pleasant No. 2 =

Rural municipality in Saskatchewan, Canada

Mount Pleasant No. 2
- Rural municipality
- Rural Municipality of Mount Pleasant No. 2
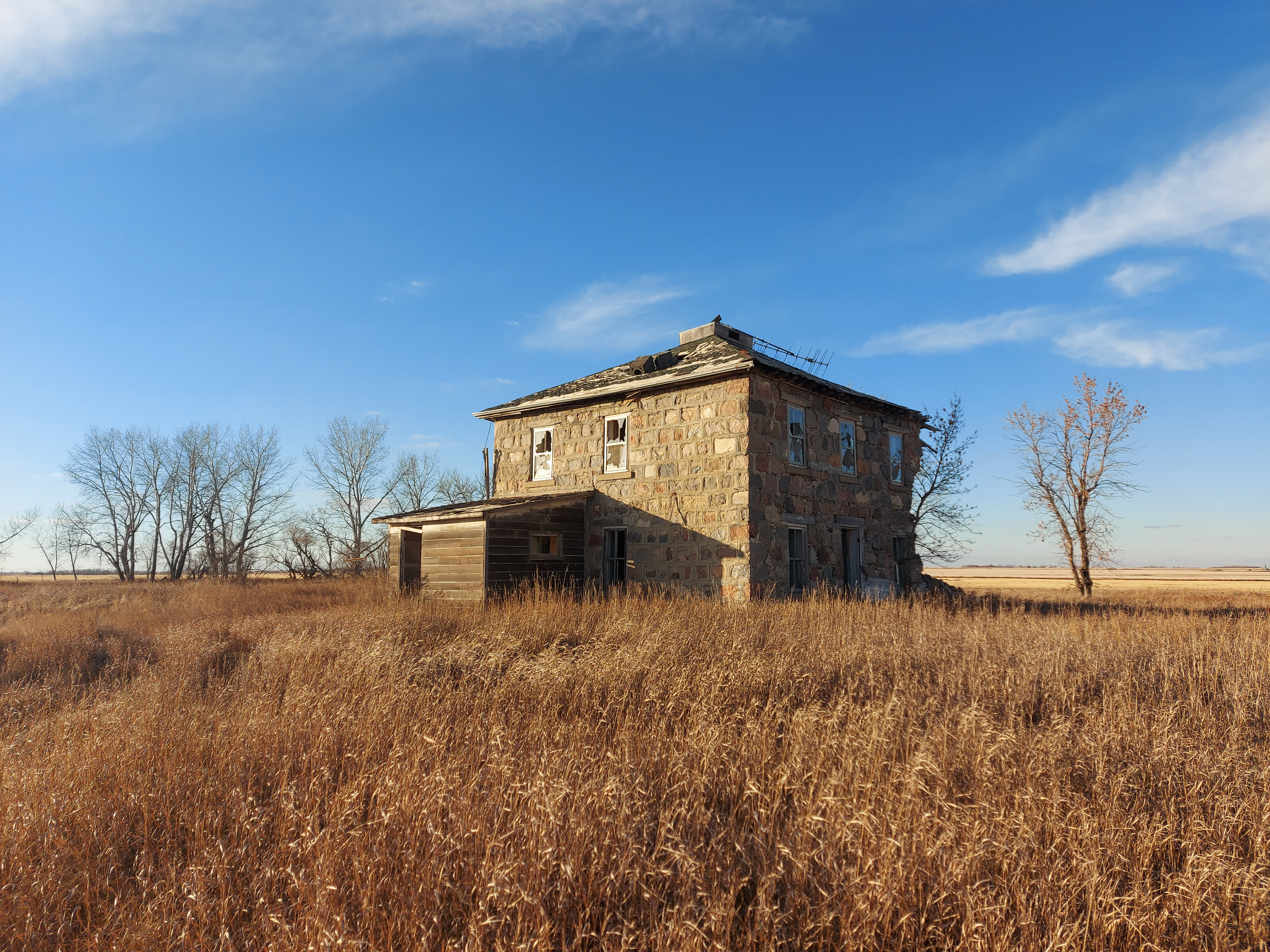
- Abandoned farm house in the RM of Mount Pleasant

- Location of the RM of Mount Pleasant No. 2 in Saskatchewan
- Coordinates: 49.134°N 101.815°W
- Country: Canada
- Province: Saskatchewan
- Census division: 1
- SARM division: 1
- Federal riding: Souris—Moose Mountain
- Provincial riding: Cannington
- Formed: December 11, 1911

Government
  - Reeve: Chad Baglole
  - Governing body: RM of Mount Pleasant No. 2 Council
  - Administrator: Lydia M. Hammell
  - Office location: Carnduff

Area (2021)
  - Land: 772.71 km^{2} (298.34 sq mi)

Population (2021)
  - Total: 419
  - Density: 0.5/km^{2} (1.3/sq mi)
- Time zone: CST
  - Summer (DST): CST
- Postal code: S0C 0S0
- Area codes: 306 and 639

The Rural Municipality of Mount Pleasant No. 2 (2016 population: 414) is a rural municipality (RM) in the Canadian province of Saskatchewan within Census Division No. 1 and SARM Division No. 1. Located in the southeast portion of the province, it is adjacent to the United States border, neighbouring Renville County in North Dakota.

== History ==
The RM of Mount Pleasant No. 2 incorporated as a rural municipality on December 11, 1911.

== Geography ==
=== Communities and localities ===
The following urban municipalities are surrounded by the RM.

Towns

- Carnduff

Villages

- Carievale

The following unincorporated communities are within the RM.

Localities

- Elmore

== Demographics ==
Population history (1981–2016)
| Year | Pop. | ±% |
|---|---|---|
| 1981 | 495 | — |
| 1986 | 520 | +5.1% |
| 1991 | 486 | −6.5% |
| 1996 | 477 | −1.9% |
| 2001 | 420 | −11.9% |
| 2006 | 418 | −0.5% |
| 2011 | 383 | −8.4% |
| 2016 | 414 | +8.1% |
| 2021 | 419 | +1.2% |
Source: Statistics Canada via Saskatchewan Bureau of Statistics

In the 2021 Census of Population conducted by Statistics Canada, the RM of Mount Pleasant No. 2 had a population of 419 living in 152 of its 182 total private dwellings, a change of 1.2% from its 2016 population of 414. With a land area of 772.71 km^{2} (298.34 sq mi), it had a population density of 0.5/km^{2} (1.4/sq mi) in 2021.

In the 2016 Census of Population, the RM of Mount Pleasant No. 2 recorded a population of 414 living in 144 of its 151 total private dwellings, a 8.1% change from its 2011 population of 383. With a land area of 780.83 km^{2} (301.48 sq mi), it had a population density of 0.5/km^{2} (1.4/sq mi) in 2016.

== Government ==
The RM of Mount Pleasant No. 2 is governed by an elected municipal council and an appointed administrator that meets on the second Tuesday of every month. The reeve of the RM is Chad Baglole while its administrator is Lydia M. Hammell. The RM's office is located in Carnduff.

== See also ==
- List of rural municipalities in Saskatchewan
