= Fertile, Saskatchewan =

Fertile
- Location of Fertile in Saskatchewan
- Coordinates: 49°23′0″N 101°27′02″W
- Country: Canada
- Province: Saskatchewan
- Region: Central Plains
- Census Division: No. 1

Government
  - Governing Body: Rural Municipality of Storthoaks Council
  - MP: Ed Komarnicki
  - MLA: Dan D'Autremont
- Time zone: UTC−6 (CST)
- Postal Code: S0C 0W0
- Area codes: 306, 639
- Highways: Highway 361 / Highway 600

Fertile is an unincorporated community in southeastern Saskatchewan, Canada, located 3 miles (4.8 km) west of the Manitoba border and 40 miles (64 km) north of the U.S. border in the Rural Municipality of Storthoaks No. 31.

== Demographics ==
The population was once as high as 50 people, but now is supported by surrounding farm families. Fertile once had its own school (shrined), grain elevators (2), general store, skating/curling rink, United church (shrined), community hall and post office. Unfortunately all closed. Families making up the current community include; Pickard(2), Holden(2), Real(4), Rekken(2), Millions, Bouchard (2), VanderWaal, Poirier. Fall suppers, slow-pitch tournament, dine and dance, an annual event, be it a comedy act, a magician, etc., used to be held to raise money to support the community hall was known all around.

== Climate ==
Climate data for Fertile
Month	Jan	Feb	Mar	Apr	May	Jun	Jul	Aug	Sep	Oct	Nov	Dec	Year
Record high °C (°F)	8.0 (46.4)	17.5 (63.5)	18.5 (65.3)	33.9 (93.0)	37.2 (99.0)	38.3 (100.9)	38 (100)	39 (102)	36.7 (98.1)	33 (91)	22.5 (72.5)	11.7 (53.1)	39 (102)
Mean daily maximum °C (°F)	−9.2 (15.4)	−6.9 (19.6)	0.2 (32.4)	11.2 (52.2)	18.4 (65.1)	22.7 (72.9)	25.7 (78.3)	25.6 (78.1)	19.1 (66.4)	11.2 (52.2)	−0.5 (31.1)	−7.9 (17.8)	9.1 (48.4)
Daily mean °C (°F)	−14.4 (6.1)	−12 (10)	−4.6 (23.7)	4.7 (40.5)	11.6 (52.9)	16.3 (61.3)	19.0 (66.2)	18.3 (64.9)	12.2 (54.0)	4.9 (40.8)	−5.2 (22.6)	−12.7 (9.1)	3.2 (37.8)
Mean daily minimum °C (°F)	−19.5 (−3.1)	−17.1 (1.2)	−9.4 (15.1)	−1.9 (28.6)	4.7 (40.5)	9.9 (49.8)	12.3 (54.1)	10.9 (51.6)	5.2 (41.4)	−1.3 (29.7)	−9.8 (14.4)	−17.5 (0.5)	−2.8 (27.0)
Record low °C (°F)	−40 (−40)	−41 (−42)	−38.3 (−36.9)	−24.4 (−11.9)	−10 (14)	−1 (30)	1.5 (34.7)	−3 (27)	−8.9 (16.0)	−21 (−6)	−32.5 (−26.5)	−41.5 (−42.7)	−41.5 (−42.7)
Average precipitation mm (inches)	25.7 (1.01)	18.5 (0.73)	24.1 (0.95)	31.0 (1.22)	66.9 (2.63)	82.4 (3.24)	64.5 (2.54)	50.4 (1.98)	41.5 (1.63)	35.7 (1.41)	24.8 (0.98)	24.7 (0.97)	490.0 (19.29)
Source: Environment Canada

== See also ==
- List of communities in Saskatchewan
