= Glen Ewen =

Village in Saskatchewan, Canada

- Village
- Village of Glen Ewen
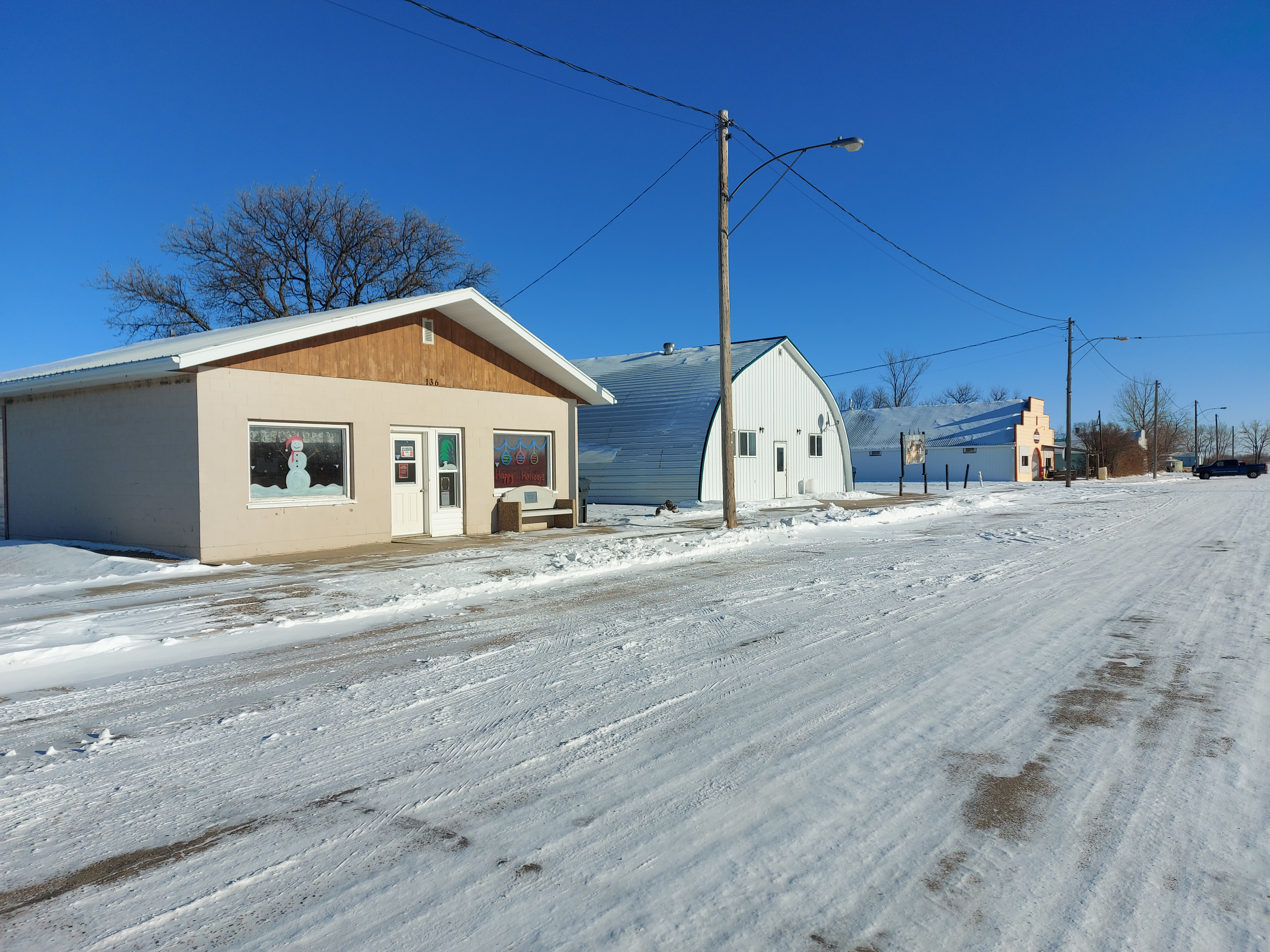
- Downtown Glen Ewen

- Location of Glen Ewen in Saskatchewan Glen Ewen (Canada)
- Coordinates: 49.2063°N 102.0195°W
- Country: Canada
- Province: Saskatchewan
- Region: Southeast
- Census division: 1
- Rural Municipality: Enniskillen No. 3
- Post office Founded: 1890-11-01

Government
  - Type: Municipal
  - Governing body: Glen Ewen Village Council
  - Mayor: Glen Lewis
  - Administrator: Myrna-Jean Babbings
  - MP: Robert Kitchen
  - MLA: Dan D'Autremont

Area
  - Total: 2.77 km^{2} (1.07 sq mi)

Population (2016)
  - Total: 154
  - Density: 55.6/km^{2} (144/sq mi)
- Time zone: UTC-6 (CST)
- Postal code: S0C 1C0
- Area code: 306
- Highways: Highway 18 / Highway 601
- Railways: Canadian Pacific Railway
- Website: Village of Glen Ewen

Glen Ewen (2016 population: 154) is a village in the Canadian province of Saskatchewan within the Rural Municipality of Enniskillen No. 3 and Census Division No. 1. The village is located on the Canadian Pacific Railway just south of Highway 18. The towns of Carnduff and Oxbow are nearby.

The community was founded March 24, 1905 by a rail worker and Glen Ewen's first postmaster (Thomas Ewen). The town policy of tearing down any dwellings which have been vacated, combined with the current boom in the oilfield in this area, has resulted in a housing shortage for incoming workers. The school closed in November, 1989, and is now the Glen Ewen Communiplex.

In 2011, the new Glen Ewen Hotel opened, replacing the old hotel that had burned down in 2007.

== History ==
Glen Ewen incorporated as a village on March 24, 1904.

In 1959, the now defunct Glen Ewen Eagles were among the four founding teams of the men's senior Big 6 Hockey League. They never won a championship.

== Demographics ==
Population history (1981–2016)
Year	Pop.	±%
1981	168	—
1986	197	+17.3%
1991	152	−22.8%
1996	148	−2.6%
2001	158	+6.8%
2006	120	−24.1%
2011	144	+20.0%
2016	154	+6.9%
Source: Statistics Canada via Saskatchewan Bureau of Statistics

In the 2021 Census of Population conducted by Statistics Canada, Glen Ewen had a population of 159 living in 64 of its 70 total private dwellings, a change of 3.2% from its 2016 population of 154. With a land area of 2.59 km^{2} (1.00 sq mi), it had a population density of 61.4/km^{2} (159.0/sq mi) in 2021.

In the 2016 Census of Population, the Village of Glen Ewen recorded a population of 154 living in 69 of its 78 total private dwellings, a 6.5% change from its 2011 population of 144. With a land area of 2.77 km^{2} (1.07 sq mi), it had a population density of 55.6/km^{2} (144.0/sq mi) in 2016.

== See also ==
- List of communities in Saskatchewan
- List of villages in Saskatchewan
