= Antler River =

River in central North America

Antler River Antler Creek
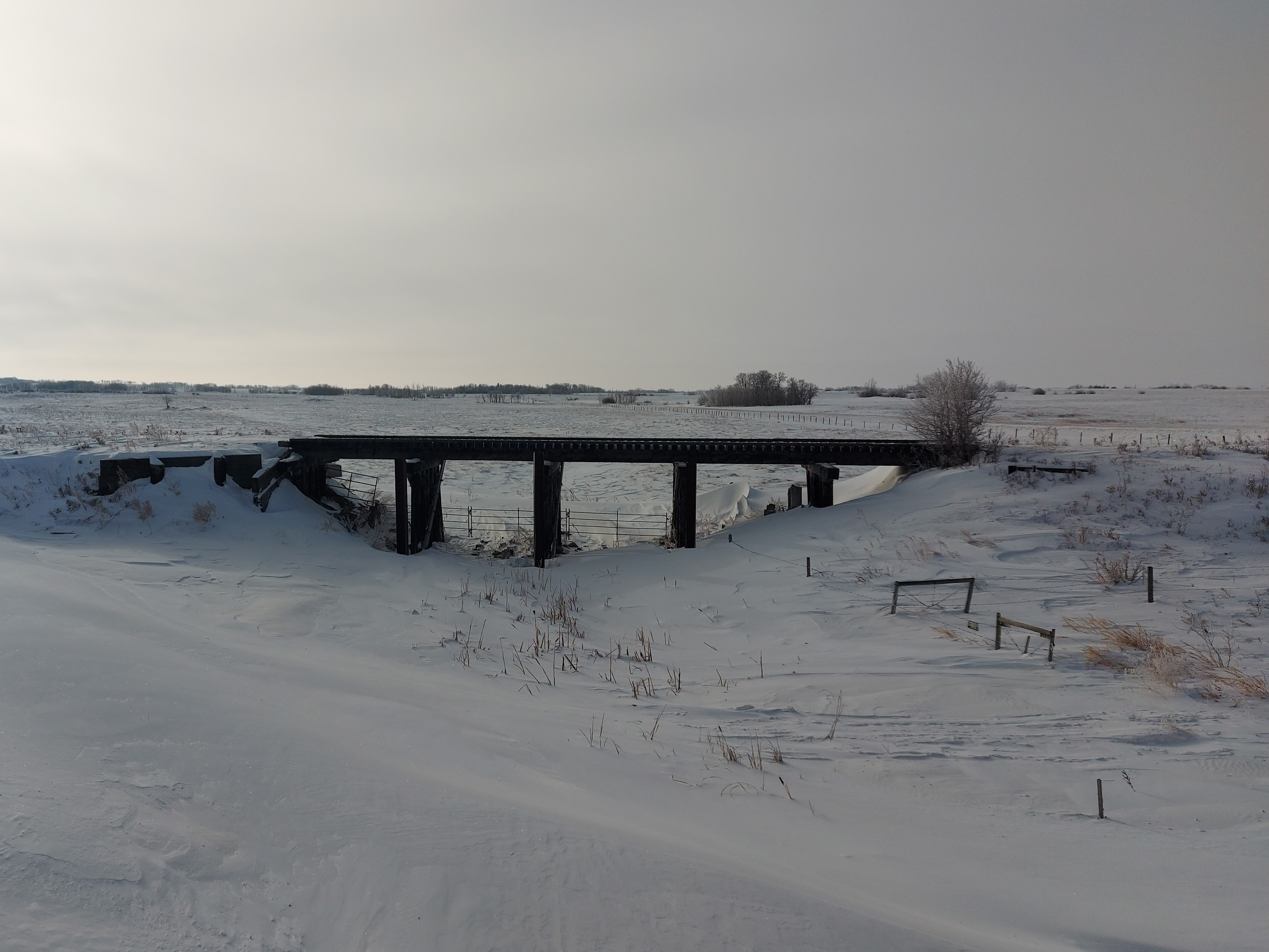
- An abandoned CPR bridge over a frozen Antler River in Saskatchewan

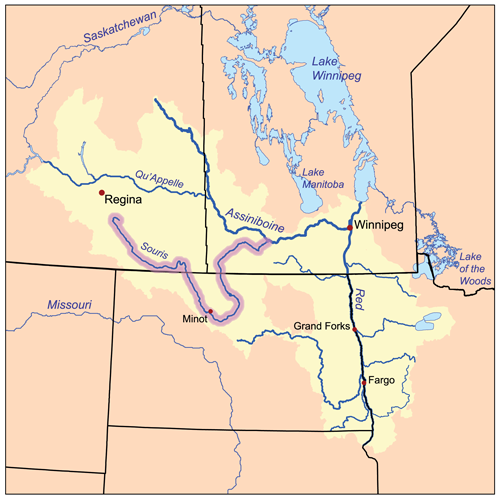
- The Red River drainage basin, with the Souris River highlighted

- Location of mouth in Manitoba, Canada Antler River (Canada)

Location
- Countries: Canada; United States
- Provinces: Saskatchewan; Manitoba
- State: North Dakota
- Towns: Carnduff, Sk

Physical characteristics
- Source: Moose Mountain Upland
  - location: Saskatchewan
- Mouth: Souris River, south of Melita
  - location: Manitoba
  - coordinates: 49°08′05″N 101°00′29″W
- Discharge
  - location: Souris River

Basin features
- River system: Red River drainage basin
- Tributaries
  - left: Auburnton Creek; Weatherald Creek
  - right: Lightning Creek

The Antler River is located in the Prairie Pothole Region of North America's Great Plains in south-eastern Saskatchewan and south-western Manitoba in Canada in an area known as Palliser's Triangle. Its source is in Saskatchewan's Moose Mountain Upland and it is a major tributary of the Souris River. As a result, its flood levels are monitored by the United States Geological Survey.

In 2011, several communities along the river experienced abnormally severe spring flooding that resulted in damage to many bridges crossing the river. Near Carnduff, repairs were still ongoing months after the water level had subsided.

The Antler River Recreation District is an association of communities in the south-western corner of Manitoba that are on or near the river and its related branches. Towns involved include Melita and Pierson.

== Course ==
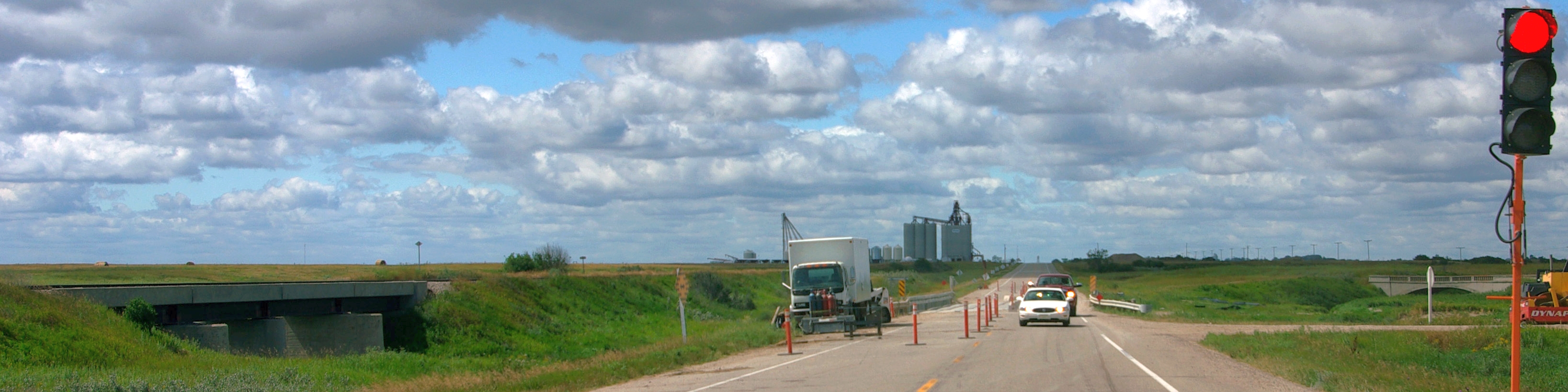
Traffic diversion east of Carnduff, Saskatchewan to allow bridge repairs

The river starts on the eastern side of Moose Mountain Upland, north-east of the lakes of Kenosee and White Bear (Carlyle). and drains much of the eastern side of the upland. From there, the river heads south. It crosses Highway 13 just east of Wauchope and Highway 601. From there it continues south along the same route as the 601, crossing Highway 361 just west of Alida. As the river nears Highway 18, it is joined by Auburnton Creek and starts to head in a more south-easterly direction, crossing Highway 318 at Carnduff and Highway 18 between Carnduff and Carievale. It continues south-east until it crosses into Manitoba. Two miles after crossing into Manitoba, it crosses the Canada–United States border, near the Antler–Lyleton Border Crossing, into North Dakota. The closest community to the river in North Dakota is Antler. The rivers heads east paralleling the border for about three miles before going back into Manitoba. The river then heads north-east until it meets up with the Souris River upstream and south of Melita.

=== Dams ===
There are two small dams along the river. One is just north-west of Carnduff. The other is in North Dakota. The North Dakota dam is called Antler Creek Dam and there is a park there called Memorial Park.

=== Tributaries ===
- Weatherald Creek, a creek that starts at Weatherald Lake (of which Birch and Skeleton Lakes flow into) on Moose Mountain Upland in Moose Mountain Provincial Park and meets up with Antler River as it leaves the upland.
- Auburnton Creek, a river that starts east of Cannington Lake and flows south where it meets up with the Antler River north-west of Carnduff. There is a small dam on the creek about one mile upstream from where it meets Antler River.
- Lightning Creek, a river that starts near Wawota and heads south past Redvers following Highway 8. It meets up with the Antler River about half-way between Carnduff and Carievale near where the Antler crosses Highway 18.

== Flora and fauna ==
The Antler River is located in the Great Plains ecoregion of North America.

Purple Locoweed (Oxytropis lambertii) is known to be found in parts of the river valley.

== See also ==
- List of rivers of Manitoba
- List of rivers of Saskatchewan
- List of rivers of North Dakota
