= Carnduff =

Town in Saskatchewan, Canada

- Town
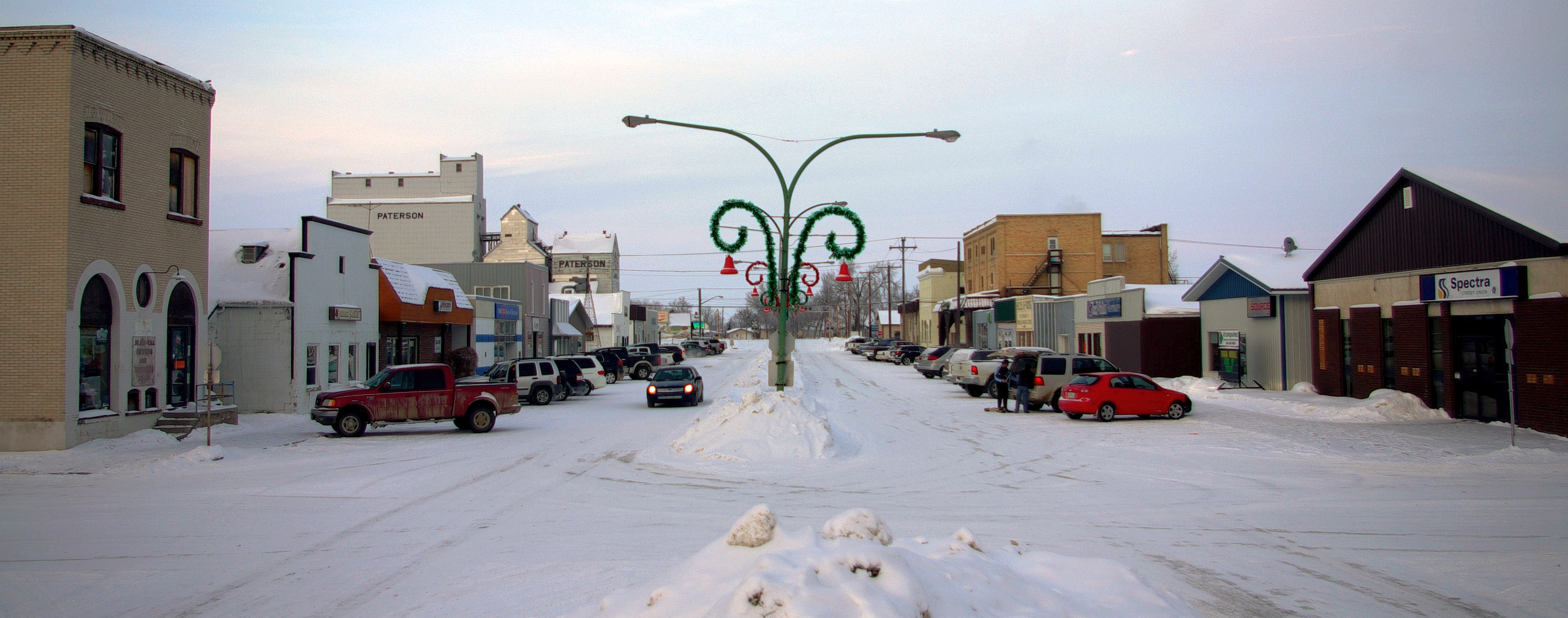
- Downtown Carnduff
- Motto: "A community on the move"
- Location of Carnduff Carnduff (Canada)
- Coordinates: 49.167°N 101.783°W
- Country: Canada
- Province: Saskatchewan
- Rural Municipality: Mount Pleasant No. 2
- Post Office Established: 1884-09-01

Government
  - Mayor: Ross Apperley
  - Administrator: Annette Brown
  - Governing body: Carnduff Town Council

Area
  - Total: 2.26 km^{2} (0.87 sq mi)
- Elevation: 515 m (1,690 ft)

Population (2011)
  - Total: 1,126
  - Density: 192.0/km^{2} (497.3/sq mi)
- Time zone: CST (winter) / MST (summer)
- Postal code: S0C 0S0
- Area code: 306
- Highways: Highway 18

Carnduff is a small agricultural town in southeast Saskatchewan, Canada near the USA border and the Manitoba border.

== History ==
Carnduff is named after its first postmaster, John Carnduff. It was marked on early CPR maps, though that location did not exactly correspond to the present town site later surveyed in 1891.

In 2001, the town was noted as having trees affected by Dutch Elm Disease.

== Geography ==
The town lies at the intersection of Highway 318 and Highway 18. The Canadian Pacific Railway runs parallel to Highway 18 and their combined thoroughfare splits the town into a north half and a south half. The majority of housing and businesses are in the southern half of the town, while the northern half has a majority of the recreation facilities and larger industrial buildings. The Antler River flows around the north side and east of the town, adding a small valley to the otherwise flat local flat prairie.

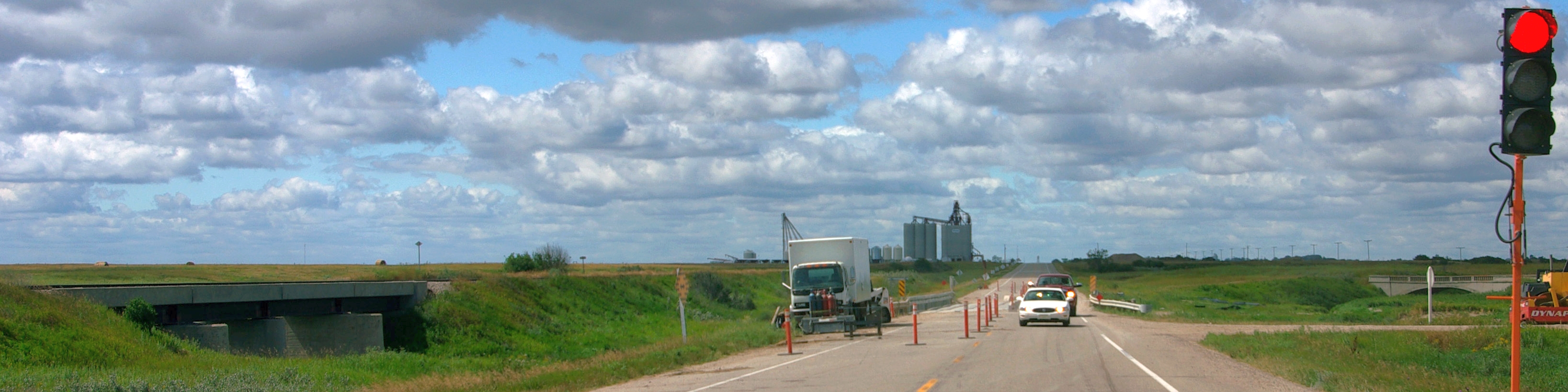
Traffic diversion to allow flood damage repairs to bridge

Severe flooding in the Souris River basin region during the spring and summer of 2011 caused damage to bridges over the Antler River north and east of the town. Significant repair work was required on the Highway 18 bridge near the Viterra terminal.

The nearest locations with a population larger than 10,000 are Estevan 90 kilometres to the west, and Minot, North Dakota 140 Kilometres to the south-east. The provincial capital, Regina, is approximately three hours north-west by highway.

== Demographics ==
In the 2021 Census of Population conducted by Statistics Canada, Carnduff had a population of 1,150 living in 430 of its 527 total private dwellings, a change of 4.6% from its 2016 population of 1,099. With a land area of 2.61 km^{2} (1.01 sq mi), it had a population density of 440.6/km^{2} (1,141.2/sq mi) in 2021.

Canada census – Carnduff community profile

	2021	2011
Population	1,150 (+4.6% from 2016)	1,126 (+11.3% from 2006)
Land area	2.61 km^{2} (1.01 sq mi)	2.26 km^{2} (0.87 sq mi)
Population density	441/km^{2} (1,140/sq mi)	497.3/km^{2} (1,288/sq mi)
Median age	40.8 (M: 38.4, F: 42.4)	37.0 (M: 35.5, F: 39.3)
Private dwellings	527 (total) 430 (occupied)	488 (total)
Median household income	$89,000

References: 2021 2011

== Economy ==
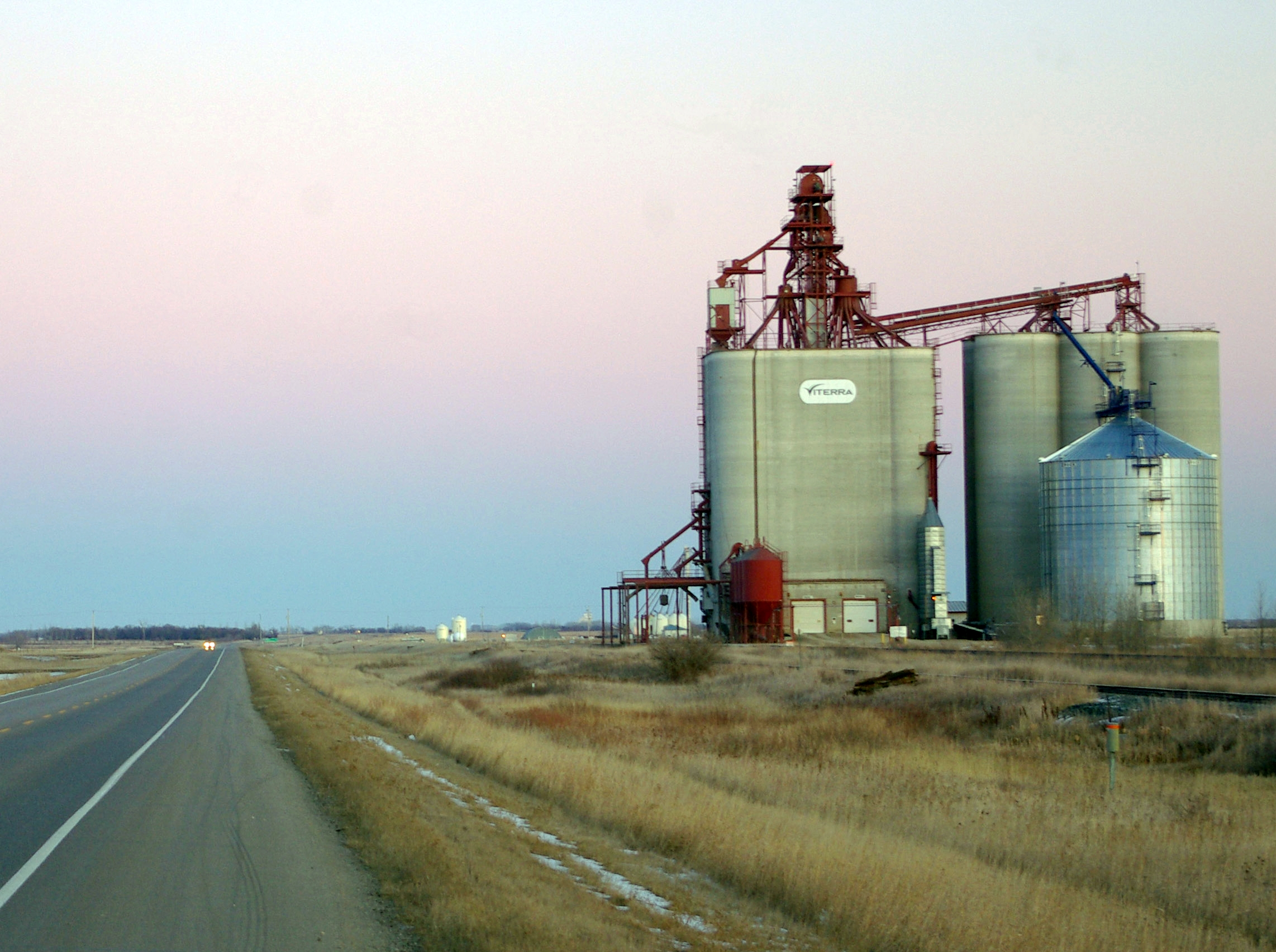
Inland grain terminal located east of town

As a larger town than those adjacent to it, Carnduff is a centre of schooling and business activity in the extreme south-eastern corner of Saskatchewan. The Gazette Post News, a weekly newspaper, is based in Carnduff and reports on items from the neighbouring communities.

The Saskatchewan Wheat Pool (SWP) built a concrete inland terminal on the rail line a few kilometres east of the town during the late 1990s. In 2010, SWP's successor corporation Viterra started an upgrade project that included an expansion of the rail-yard from 56 to 112 cars and a 7,000 metric ton increase in storage capacity that would result in 33,000 metric tons of capacity.

Because Carnduff is located within the Bakken Formation geological zone, it is surrounded by active oil and gas drilling sites. A large number of businesses in the town are involved in the petroleum industry by providing transportation, construction, or specialized oilfield services.

== Sport and recreation ==
Sporting sites available in Carnduff include tennis courts, an artificial-ice skating rink, a curling rink, a swimming pool, a five-pin bowling alley, and a rodeo ring. A nine-hole golf course, situated north of the town, opened its grass greens in 1982. The baseball facilities were moved to the west side of town and significantly upgraded in the mid-1990s to a level where the town has hosted provincial and national level tournaments in fastpitch softball.

The Carnduff Red Devils of the senior men's Big 6 Hockey League play at the local rink. The Red Devils have won the Lincoln Trophy 10 times, second only to the Bienfait Coalers' 15.

The Carnduff Astros of the Saskota Baseball League and the South East Steelers softball team play at the Carnduff Ball Diamonds.

== Education ==
The Carnduff Education Complex is part of School Division SD 209 "South East Cornerstone". It opened in 2004 and consolidated two facilities in Carnduff as well as services from other surrounding towns. Students attend classes from kindergarten to Grade 12. The former Carnduff Elementary School and Carnduff High School were re-purposed, with the latter being renamed the Dean Fraser Community Centre. Some schools in the area, specifically in Gainsborough and Storthoaks were closed, while the Carievale Elementary School was expanded to accommodate more younger students.

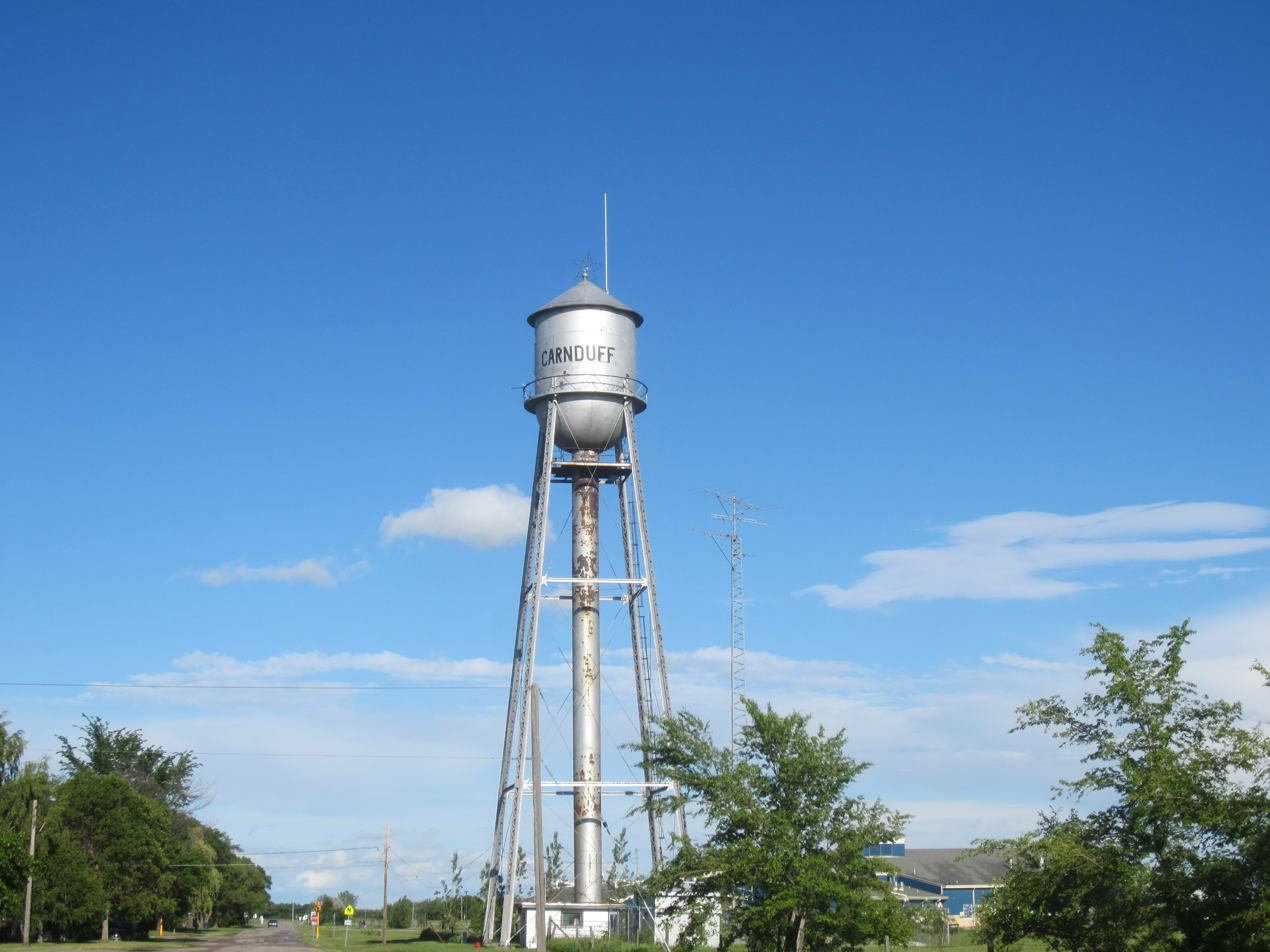
Water tower at Carnduff, Saskatchewan

== Notable people ==
- Carter Beck – baseball player
- Ernest Manning — 8th Premier of Alberta (1943–1968)
- Cecil Sturgeon — Former NFL player
- Lyle Sturgeon — Former NFL player
- Harry Wahl — Politician

== See also ==
- List of towns in Saskatchewan
