= Storthoaks =

Village in Saskatchewan, Canada

- Village
- Village of Storthoaks
- Location within Saskatchewan Location within Canada
- Coordinates: 49°23′23″N 101°36′06″W
- Country: Canada
- Province: Saskatchewan
- Census division: 1
- Rural municipality: Storthoaks No. 31

Government
  - Type: Municipal
  - Governing body: Storthoaks Village Council
  - Mayor: Syd Chicoine
  - Administrator: Kak Mah
  - MP: Robert Kitchen
  - MLA: Dan D'Autremont

Area
  - Total: 0.49 km^{2} (0.19 sq mi)

Population (2016)
  - Total: 108
  - Density: 221/km^{2} (570/sq mi)
- Time zone: CST
- Postal code: S0C 2K0
- Area code: 306
- Highways: Highway 361

Storthoaks (2016 population: 108) is a village in the Canadian province of Saskatchewan within the Rural Municipality of Storthoaks No. 31 and Census Division No. 1. The village is located approximately 129 km east of the city of Estevan on Highway 361 and 16 km west of the Saskatchewan–Manitoba border.

== History ==
Storthoaks incorporated as a village on June 5, 1940.

== Demographics ==
Population history (1981–2016)
Year	Pop.	±%
1981	142	—
1986	139	−2.1%
1991	129	−7.2%
1996	119	−7.8%
2001	99	−16.8%
2006	82	−17.2%
2011	93	+13.4%
2016	108	+16.1%
Source: Statistics Canada via Saskatchewan Bureau of Statistics

In the 2021 Census of Population conducted by Statistics Canada, Storthoaks had a population of 86 living in 31 of its 43 total private dwellings, a change of −20.4% from its 2016 population of 108. With a land area of 0.45 km^{2} (0.17 sq mi), it had a population density of 191.1/km^{2} (495.0/sq mi) in 2021.

In the 2016 Census of Population, the Village of Storthoaks recorded a population of 108 living in 43 of its 48 total private dwellings, a 13.9% change from its 2011 population of 93. With a land area of 0.49 km^{2} (0.19 sq mi), it had a population density of 220.4/km^{2} (570.9/sq mi) in 2016.

== See also ==
- List of communities in Saskatchewan
- List of villages in Saskatchewan
- List of francophone communities in Saskatchewan
- Block settlement
