= John Millar (Canadian politician) =

Canadian politician

Member of Parliament for Qu'Appelle
- In office December 1921 – May 1930
- Preceded by: Levi Thomson
- Succeeded by: Ernest Perley

Personal details
- Born: 19 March 1866 Woodstock, Canada West
- Died: 15 May 1950 (aged 84)
- Party: Progressive; Liberal Progressive
- Spouse(s): 1) Florence Fader m. 24 December 1893; 2) Carol E. Newcombe m. 19 December 1906
- Profession: farmer, teacher

John Millar (19 March 1866 – 15 May 1950) was a Progressive party and Liberal Progressive member of the House of Commons of Canada. He was born in Woodstock, Canada West and became a farmer and teacher.

Millar attended high school at Woodstock Collegiate Institute. He received a second-class teachers' certificate and became a schoolteacher in Ontario for three years and in Saskatchewan for five years. From 1901 to 1908, he was the first secretary of the Saskatchewan Grain Growers Association and in 1906 chaired the Royal Grain Commission.

Millar served as reeve of Indian Head, Saskatchewan from 1910 to 1913, then as its mayor in 1914.

He was first elected to Parliament under the Progressive Party banner in Qu'Appelle riding during the 1921 general election then re-elected in 1925. In the 1926 election, Millar was re-elected under the Liberal-Progressive party label. After this term, he was defeated by Ernest Perley of the Liberal party in the 1930 federal election.

1930 Canadian federal election: Qu'Appelle
Party	Candidate	Votes	%	±%
Liberal	Ernest Perley	7,888	53.3	
Liberal–Progressive	John Millar	6,905	46.7	-10.2
Total valid votes		14,793	100.0	

1926 Canadian federal election: Qu'Appelle
Party	Candidate	Votes	%	±%
Liberal–Progressive	John Millar	7,778	56.9	+3.5
Conservative	William Wallace Lynd	5,891	43.1	-3.5
Total valid votes		13,669	100.0	

Note: Liberal-Progressive vote is compared to Progressive vote in 1925 election.

1925 Canadian federal election: Qu'Appelle
Party	Candidate	Votes	%
Progressive	John Millar	5,272	53.4
Conservative	William Wallace Lynd	4,600	46.6
Total valid votes		9,872	100.0

1921 Canadian federal election: Qu'Appelle
Party	Candidate	Votes	%
Progressive	John Millar	8,350	69.3
Conservative	Ernest Perley	3,705	30.7
Total valid votes		12,055	100.0
