= Simon De Jong =

Canadian politician

Member of Parliament for Regina—Qu'Appelle
- In office 1988–1997
- Preceded by: riding established
- Succeeded by: Lorne Nystrom

Member of Parliament for Regina East
- In office 1979–1988
- Preceded by: James Balfour
- Succeeded by: riding disestablished

Personal details
- Born: April 29, 1942 Sidoarjo, Dutch East Indies
- Died: August 18, 2011 (aged 69)
- Party: New Democratic Party
- Education: University of Regina

Simon Leendert De Jong (April 29, 1942 – August 18, 2011) was an Indonesian-born Canadian parliamentarian. He was first elected to the House of Commons of Canada in the 1979 federal election as a New Democratic Party (NDP) Member of Parliament (MP) from Saskatchewan. He would spend five terms and 18 years in the House of Commons.

== Early life ==
Simon De Jong was born in Sidoarjo, Indonesia, spending the first three years of his life, with his mother Dirkje and older brother Hielke in a concentration camp. Of 3,000 women and children who were incarcerated by the Japanese during the occupation of Java, only a third survived. Simon's father, a Dutch mariner, was also a prisoner-of-war. The family were reunited after the war and returned to the Netherlands. They came to Canada in 1951, and Simon spent his formative years in Regina. Despite being an immigrant and non-English speaker and having a stutter, De Jong trained himself in public speaking, at which he became a provincial champion. In 1964, he became head of the student union at the University of Regina, where he wrote a constitution that empowered students and sparked campus unrest.

== Community activism ==
After graduating, De Jong turned to painting, receiving international notice as a visual artist. However, through a series of sessions with LSD researcher, Dr. Duncan Blewett, De Jong became fascinated with the possibilities for societal change represented by the burgeoning youth counter-culture of the late 1960s. In 1969 he left Regina for Vancouver, where he went to work for The Greater Vancouver Youth Communications Center Society, better known as Cool Aid. At Cool Aid, De Jong, Ray Chouinard and other street workers organized alternative health, work, housing and cultural programs that influenced the future of the city. One of De Jong's colleagues in those days was Mike Harcourt, who would later become the Premier of the Province of British Columbia.

== Career in politics ==
De Jong returned to Regina in 1975. He ran as the NDP candidate for a Regina-area riding in 1979. His victory surprised everyone including De Jong himself. He would go on to serve five terms, retiring undefeated in 1997. As a parliamentarian, he exposed the spraying of the toxic defoliant Agent Orange by the U.S. military in the Canadian Province of New Brunswick. He was the first Member of Parliament to raise concerns about global warming. He spoke for disarmament at the United Nations; and he introduced a motion to send condolences to Yoko Ono when John Lennon was killed, which the artist gratefully acknowledged when De Jong died in 2011.

In 1989, De Jong was a dark-horse candidate to succeed Ed Broadbent as the leader of the NDP. He finished a respectable fourth in the leadership convention. However, a controversy overshadowed his candidacy. De Jong had agreed to be suited with a microphone in order to assist with a Canadian Broadcasting Corporation (CBC) documentary on the convention, but forgot he was wearing it and inadvertently allowed back-room negotiations with fellow candidate Dave Barrett to be recorded. The CBC documentary used the tape as the dramatic centre-point of its convention coverage, giving it a sinister spin, as a "secret deal" cut amid "shady" back-room politics. De Jong always denied the CBC's interpretation, insisting no deal was reached. Barrett remained silent about it. The documentarians re-enforced their characterization by mistranslating a second conversation thus gathered, a discussion in Dutch between De Jong and his mother, one of his advisors. The surrounding controversy hurt De Jong but was short-lived. However the scandal had lasting repercussions for De Jong within the party and contributed to his decision to retire some years later.

De Jong remained an MP until 1997 when he decided not to run for re-election in that year's federal election, stepping aside in favour of Lorne Nystrom, who had been unseated four years earlier. After retiring from parliament, De Jong spent time in the United States, Asia and Brazil, where he became involved with the Daime church and its powerful psychedelic sacrament, ayahuasca. De Jong became increasingly philosophical, joining the mystical insights of the Daime religion to concerns about climate change and the necessity for humankind to raise its consciousness. "The more aware we become, the better we become," he said.

De Jong once said of his colleague and friend Duncan Blewett, "He saw light and love and hope where others would see only darkness." This characterized De Jong himself. When he died of leukemia on August 18, 2011, he was mourned by people of all political stripes and beliefs, including former BC Premier Harcourt and Bob Rae, leader of the Liberal Party of Canada.

== Electoral record ==
1993 Canadian federal election: Qu'Appelle
Party	Candidate	Votes	%	±%
New Democratic	Simon De Jong	11,178	34.5	-19.4
Liberal	Reina Sinclair	10,071	31.1	+16.5
Reform	Kerry Gray	7,286	22.5	
Progressive Conservative	Tom Hull	3,262	10.1	-21.4
National	Jenny Watson	392	1.2	
Canada Party	Joseph Thauberger	178	0.5	
Total valid votes		32,367	100.0	

1989 New Democratic Party leadership election
Candidate	1st ballot		2nd ballot		3rd ballot		4th ballot	
Name	Votes cast	%	Votes cast	%	Votes cast	%	Votes cast	%
Audrey McLaughlin	646	26.9%	829	34.3%	1,072	44.4%	1,316	55.1%
Dave Barrett	566	23.6%	780	32.3%	947	39.3%	1,072	44.9%
Steven Langdon	351	14.6%	519	21.5%	393	16.3%		
Simon De Jong	315	13.1%	289	12.0%				
Howard McCurdy	256	10.7%						
Ian Waddell	213	8.9%						
Roger Lagasse	53	2.2%						
Total	2,400	100.0%	2,417	100.0%	2,412	100.0%	2,388	100.0%

1988 Canadian federal election: Qu'Appelle
Party	Candidate	Votes	%
New Democratic	Simon De Jong	18,608	54.0
Progressive Conservative	William Lawrence Hicke	10,854	31.5
Liberal	Larry Smith	5,028	14.6
Total valid votes		34,490	100.0

1984 Canadian federal election: Regina East
Party	Candidate	Votes
New Democratic	Simon De Jong	20,474
Progressive Conservative	Brian Keple	15,185
Liberal	Dave Bouchard	9,554
Confederation of Regions	Emanuel Fahlman	408

1980 Canadian federal election: Regina East
Party	Candidate	Votes
New Democratic	Simon De Jong	13,630
Progressive Conservative	Brian Keple	12,602
Liberal	Anthony Merchant	10,302
Rhinoceros	Derron Hoover	302
Independent	Jerry White	74
Marxist–Leninist	Carl George Beal	61
Communist	Gordon Massie	39

1979 Canadian federal election: Regina East
Party	Candidate	Votes
New Democratic	Simon De Jong	15,022
Progressive Conservative	Terry Leier	12,972
Liberal	Anthony Merchant	12,645
Social Credit	Emanuel Fahlman	344
Communist	Gordon Massie	65
Marxist–Leninist	George Beal	51

Parliament of Canada
Preceded by James Balfour	Member of Parliament for Regina East; 1979–1988	Succeeded by The electoral district was abolished in 1987.
Preceded by The electoral district was created in 1987.	Member of Parliament for Regina—Qu'Appelle; 1988–1997	Succeeded by Lorne Nystrom
