= Archibald Riddell =

Archibald Riddell may refer to:

- Archibald Riddell (politician)
- Archibald Riddell (minister)
