= Robert McKenzie (Canadian politician) =

Canadian politician

Member of Parliament for Assiniboia
- In office October 1925 – December 1935
- Preceded by: Oliver Robert Gould
- Succeeded by: James Garfield Gardiner

Personal details
- Born: 1 February 1875 Jarvis, Ontario, Canada
- Died: 15 January 1942 (aged 66)
- Party: Liberal
- Spouse(s): Emma E. Irish m. 30 January 1907
- Profession: Agent

Robert McKenzie (1 February 1875 – 15 January 1942) was a Liberal party member of the House of Commons of Canada. He was born in Jarvis, Ontario and became an agent.

McKenzie attended school at Walpole Township, then studied at Ontario Veterinary College. From 1910 to 1926, he was Secretary-Treasurer of Tecumseh No. 65, Saskatchewan, including municipal and school board service at the village of Stoughton. In 1925 and 1926, he was the director for the Saskatchewan Rural Municipal Association. In 1931, he began to serve on the Canadian Order of Foresters executive committee.

He was first elected to Parliament at the Assiniboia riding in the 1925 general election then re-elected in 1926, 1930 and 1935. McKenzie resigned on 8 December 1935 and took a position with the Canadian Farm Loan Board to allow fellow Liberal James Garfield Gardiner to campaign for and win the seat.
