= Moose Mountain (federal electoral district) =

Former federal electoral district in Saskatchewan, Canada

Moose Mountain was a federal electoral district in Saskatchewan, Canada, that was represented in the House of Commons of Canada from 1948 to 1968. This riding was created in 1947 from parts of Assiniboia, Qu’Appelle and Weyburn ridings

The electoral district was abolished in 1966 when it was merged into Qu'Appelle—Moose Mountain riding.

== Election results ==
1949 Canadian federal election
Party	Candidate	Votes
Liberal	John James Smith	9,277
Co-operative Commonwealth	Edward George McCullough	8,199
Progressive Conservative	Gordon Duncan Gray	2,570

1953 Canadian federal election
Party	Candidate	Votes
Co-operative Commonwealth	Edward McCullough	8,697
Liberal	John James Smith	8,552
Social Credit	William Charles Gamelin	1,067

1957 Canadian federal election
Party	Candidate	Votes
Co-operative Commonwealth	Edward McCullough	6,770
Liberal	John James Smith	6,373
Progressive Conservative	Richard Southam	3,683
Social Credit	William Wallace Lynd	3,117

1958 Canadian federal election
Party	Candidate	Votes
Progressive Conservative	Richard Southam	9,287
Co-operative Commonwealth	Edward McCullough	5,712
Liberal	J.J. Smith	5,130

1962 Canadian federal election
Party	Candidate	Votes
Progressive Conservative	Richard Southam	8,695
Liberal	Tom Beamish	6,271
New Democratic	Edward McCullough	4,156
Social Credit	Howard A. Young	1,214

1963 Canadian federal election
Party	Candidate	Votes
Progressive Conservative	Richard Southam	9,949
Liberal	Tom Beamish	5,962
New Democratic	Harry Richardson	3,270
Social Credit	Stan Wilson	843

1965 Canadian federal election
Party	Candidate	Votes
Progressive Conservative	Richard Southam	8,781
Liberal	Frank Mather	5,375
New Democratic	David Adams	4,459
Social Credit	David Brian Pascuzzo	426

== See also ==
- List of Canadian electoral districts
- Historical federal electoral districts of Canada
