= Souris (Saskatchewan electoral district) =

Former provincial electoral district in Saskatchewan, Canada

Coordinates: 49°35′N 103°00′W

Souris was a provincial electoral district for the Legislative Assembly of the province of Saskatchewan, Canada. This district was one of 25 created for the 1st Saskatchewan general election in 1905. The constituency was dissolved and combined with the Estevan district (as Souris-Estevan) before the 8th Saskatchewan general election in 1934.

It is now part of the provincial constituencies of Estevan and Cannington.

== Members of the Legislative Assembly ==
#	MLA	Served	Party
1.	James Thomas Brown	1905 – 1908	Provincial Rights
2.	Archibald W. Riddell	1908 – 1912	Provincial Rights
3.	Richard Forsyth	1912 – 1917	Liberal
4.	William Oliver Fraser	1917 – 1921	Conservative
5.	John Patrick Gordon	1921 – 1925	Conservative
6.	Jesse P. Tripp	1925 – 1929	Liberal
7.	William Oliver Fraser	1929 – 1934	Conservative

== Election results ==
1905 Saskatchewan general election: Souris electoral district
Party	Candidate	Votes	%	±%
Provincial Rights	James Thomas Brown	1,788	55.10%	–
Liberal	William Turner Lockhart	1,457	44.90%	–
Total		3,245	100.00%	

1908 Saskatchewan general election: Souris electoral district
Party	Candidate	Votes	%	±%
Provincial Rights	Archibald W. Riddell	1,132	60.76%	+5.66
Liberal	John Young	731	39.24%	-5.66
Total		1,863	100.00%	

1912 Saskatchewan general election: Souris electoral district
Party	Candidate	Votes	%	±%
Liberal	Richard Forsyth	756	51.15%	+11.91
Conservative	J.J. Heaslip	722	48.85%	-11.91
Total		1,478	100.00%	

1917 Saskatchewan general election: Souris electoral district
Party	Candidate	Votes	%	±%
Conservative	William Oliver Fraser	1,905	56.55%	+7.70
Liberal	Richard Forsyth	1,464	43.45%	-7.70
Total		3,369	100.00%	

1921 Saskatchewan general election: Souris electoral district
Party	Candidate	Votes	%	±%
Conservative	John Patrick Gordon	1,260	50.58%	-5.97
Liberal	Edward Waddington	1,231	49.42%	+5.97
Total		2,491	100.00%	

1925 Saskatchewan general election: Souris electoral district
Party	Candidate	Votes	%	±%
Liberal	Jesse P. Tripp	1,409	51.86%	+2.44
Conservative	John Patrick Gordon	1,308	48.14%	-2.44
Total		2,717	100.00%	

1929 Saskatchewan general election: Souris electoral district
Party	Candidate	Votes	%	±%
Conservative	William Oliver Fraser	1,784	50.62%	+2.48
Liberal	Jesse P. Tripp	1,740	49.38%	-2.48
Total		3,524	100.00%	

== See also ==
- List of Saskatchewan provincial electoral districts
- List of Saskatchewan general elections
- Canadian provincial electoral districts
- Souris — North-West Territories territorial electoral district (1870–1905)
