= Albert B. Douglas =

Canadian politician

MP for Assiniboia
- In office June 25, 1969 – March 6, 1971
- Preceded by: Lawrence E. Watson
- Succeeded by: Bill Knight

Personal details
- Born: September 2, 1912 Briercrest, Saskatchewan
- Died: March 6, 1971 (aged 58)
- Party: Liberal
- Occupation: Farmer

Albert B. Douglas (September 2, 1912 – March 6, 1971) was the eldest of the five sons of Will and Clara Douglas. He was the first person born in Briercrest, Saskatchewan, Canada. A Saskatchewan wheat farmer, he was a member of parliament elected during the 28th Canadian Parliament on June 25, 1969, representing the Assiniboia riding. The Albert Douglas Dam across the Souris River south of Weyburn was named after him.
