= John J. Smith (disambiguation) =

John J. Smith was an African American abolitionist.

John J. Smith may also refer to:

- John James Smith (1912–1987), Canadian politician
- John Joseph Smith (1904–1980), American politician
