= Souris—Moose Mountain =

Federal electoral district in Saskatchewan, Canada

Saskatchewan electoral district
- Interactive map of riding boundaries from the 2025 federal election

Federal electoral district
- Legislature: House of Commons
MP
Steven Bonk
Conservative
- District created: 1987
- First contested: 1988
- Last contested: 2025
- District webpage: profile, map

Demographics
- Population (2011): 72,058
- Electors (2015): 51,580
- Area (km²): 43,184
- Pop. density (per km²): 1.7
- Census subdivision(s): Weyburn, Estevan, Edenwold (part), Moosomin, Assiniboia, Carlyle, Oxbow, Estevan, Carnduff, Weyburn

Souris—Moose Mountain is a federal electoral district in Saskatchewan, Canada; it has been represented in the House of Commons of Canada since 1988.

== Geography ==
This electoral district is located in Southeast Saskatchewan, encompassing the cities of Weyburn and Estevan. The riding extends from Radville in the west to the Manitoba border, and from Estevan to Grenfell and the Qu'Appelle River in the north.

== History ==
This district was created in 1987 from Qu'Appelle—Moose Mountain and portions of the Assiniboia riding.

This riding lost a fraction of territory to Moose Jaw—Lake Centre—Lanigan and gained significant territory from Wascana during the 2012 electoral redistribution.

=== Historical boundaries ===
1996 representation order

2013 representation order

2023 final report

=== Members of Parliament ===
Parliament	Years	Member	Party
Souris—Moose Mountain; Riding created from Qu'Appelle—Moose Mountain and Assiniboia
34th	1988–1993	Lenard Gustafson	Progressive Conservative
35th	1993–1997	Bernie Collins	Liberal
36th	1997–2000	Roy Bailey	Reform
36th	2000–2000	Roy Bailey	Alliance
37th	2000–2003	Roy Bailey	Alliance
37th	2003–2004	Roy Bailey	Conservative
38th	2004–2006	Ed Komarnicki	Conservative
39th	2006–2008	Ed Komarnicki	Conservative
40th	2008–2011	Ed Komarnicki	Conservative
41st	2011–2015	Ed Komarnicki	Conservative
42nd	2015–2019	Robert Kitchen	Conservative
43rd	2019–2021	Robert Kitchen	Conservative
44th	2021–2025	Robert Kitchen	Conservative
45th	2025–present	Steven Bonk	Conservative

=== Current member of Parliament ===
Its member of Parliament is Steven Bonk, who was first elected to represent the riding in the 2025 Canadian federal election.

== Demographics ==
Panethnic groups in Souris—Moose Mountain (2011−2021)
Panethnic group	2021		2016		2011	
Panethnic group	Pop.	%	Pop.	%	Pop.	%
European (Note: Statistic includes all persons that did not make up part of a visible minority or an indigenous identity.)	57,275	82.86%	61,210	86.19%	62,870	89.39%
Indigenous	7,090	10.26%	5,860	8.25%	6,025	8.57%
Southeast Asian (Note: Statistic includes total responses of "Filipino" and "Southeast Asian" under visible minority section on census.)	2,860	4.14%	2,285	3.22%	710	1.01%
South Asian	740	1.07%	605	0.85%	225	0.32%
East Asian (Note: Statistic includes total responses of "Chinese", "Korean", and "Japanese" under visible minority section on census.)	410	0.59%	325	0.46%	250	0.36%
African	360	0.52%	410	0.58%	170	0.24%
Latin American	140	0.2%	115	0.16%	20	0.03%
Middle Eastern (Note: Statistic includes total responses of "West Asian" and "Arab" under visible minority section on census.)	100	0.14%	75	0.11%	0	0%
Other/multiracial (Note: Statistic includes total responses of "Visible minority, n.i.e." and "Multiple visible minorities" under visible minority section on census.)	145	0.21%	130	0.18%	40	0.06%
Total responses	69,120	97.93%	71,020	97.78%	70,330	97.6%
Total population	70,579	100%	72,635	100%	72,058	100%
Notes: Totals greater than 100% due to multiple origin responses. Demographics based on 2012 Canadian federal electoral redistribution riding boundaries.

== Election results ==
Graph of election results in Souris—Moose Mountain (minor parties that never got 2% of the vote or didn't run consistently are omitted)

2025 Canadian federal election
Party	Candidate	Votes	%	±%	Expenditures
Conservative	Steven Bonk	34,793	83.7%		
Liberal	Aziz Mian	4,051	9.7%		
New Democratic	Sheena Muirhead Koops	1,888	4.5%		
Green	Remi Rheault	371	0.9%		
Canadian Future	Lyndon Dayman	304	0.7%		
Independent	Travis Patron	157	0.4%		
Total valid votes/expense limit					
Total rejected ballots					
Turnout		41,564			
Eligible voters					
Source: Elections Canada

2021 federal election redistributed results
Party	Vote	%
Conservative	31,897	76.01
People's	3,848	9.17
New Democratic	3,377	8.05
Liberal	1,763	4.20
Green	24	0.06
Others	1,053	2.51

2021 Canadian federal election
Party	Candidate	Votes	%	±%	Expenditures
Conservative	Robert Kitchen	30,049	76.4	-8	$42,572.46
People's	Diane Neufeld	3,571	9.1	+7.4	$2,854.44
New Democratic	Hannah Ann Duerr	3,107	7.9	+0.16	$0.00
Liberal	Javin Ames-Sinclair	1,636	4.2	+0.07	$2,023.58
Maverick	Greg Douglas	977	2.5	–	$3,190.12
Total valid votes/expense limit		39,340	100.0	–	$119,102.72
Total rejected ballots		285			
Turnout		39,625	76.96		
Eligible voters		51,485			
Source: Elections Canada

2019 Canadian federal election
Party	Candidate	Votes	%	±%	Expenditures
Conservative	Robert Kitchen	35,067	84.40	+14.26	$39,724.57
New Democratic	Ashlee Hicks	3,214	7.74	-5.94	$889.04
Liberal	Javin Ames-Sinclair	1,718	4.13	-9.4	$1,657.78
People's	Phillip Zajac	702	1.69		none listed
Green	Judy Mergel	681	1.64	-1.01	$294.15
Canadian Nationalist	Travis Patron	168	0.40		$10,118.21
Total valid votes/expense limit		41,550	100.0		
Total rejected ballots		114			
Turnout		41,664	80.19		
Eligible voters		51,957			
Conservative hold		Swing		+10.10	
Source: Elections Canada

2015 Canadian federal election
Party	Candidate	Votes	%	±%	Expenditures
Conservative	Robert Kitchen	26,315	70.14	-2.72	$40,077.78
New Democratic	Vicky O'Dell	5,131	13.68	-4.81	$28,983.38
Liberal	Steve Bebbington	5,076	13.53	+7.94	$159.00
Green	Bob Deptuck	994	2.65	-0.48	$0.11
Total valid votes/expense limit		37,516	100.0		$228,560.45
Total rejected ballots		126	–	–	
Turnout		37,642	72.25	+8.25	
Eligible voters		52,093			
Conservative hold		Swing		-3.78	
Source: Elections Canada

2011 federal election redistributed results
Party	Vote	%
Conservative	22,424	72.86
New Democratic	5,689	18.49
Liberal	1,719	5.59
Green	944	3.07

2011 Canadian federal election
Party	Candidate	Votes	%	±%	Expenditures
Conservative	Ed Komarnicki	21,598	74.0	+3.5	$45,028
New Democratic	Allan Arthur	5,461	18.7	+1.9	$11,460
Liberal	Gerald Borrowman	1,236	4.2	–2.5	$30,532
Green	Bob Deptuck	898	3.1	–2.9	$483
Total valid votes		29,193	100.0		–
Total rejected ballots		77	0.3	0.0	
Turnout		29,270	64.0	+3	
Eligible voters		46,242	–	–	

2008 Canadian federal election
Party	Candidate	Votes	%	±%	Expenditures
Conservative	Ed Komarnicki	19,293	70.5	+7.7	$43,314
New Democratic	Raquel Fletcher	4,599	16.8	+2.9	$6,182
Liberal	Marlin Belt	1,834	6.7	-11.8	–
Green	Bob Deptuck	1,643	6.0	+1.3	$2,093
Total valid votes/expense limit		27,369	100.0		$89,152
Total rejected ballots		90	0.3	0.0	
Turnout		27,459	57	-8	

2006 Canadian federal election
Party	Candidate	Votes	%	±%	Expenditures
Conservative	Ed Komarnicki	19,282	62.8	+25.9	$40,537
Liberal	Lonny McKague	5,681	18.5	-1.1	$42,576
New Democratic	Michael Haukeness	4,284	14.0	+0.2	$6,329
Green	Matthew Smith	1,448	4.7	+3.0	$518
Total valid votes		30,695	100.0		–
Total rejected ballots		83	0.3	0.0	
Turnout		30,778	65.3	+2.3	

2004 Canadian federal election
Party	Candidate	Votes	%	±%	Expenditures
Conservative	Ed Komarnicki	11,306	36.9	-33.1	$52,238
Independent	Grant Devine	8,399	27.4	–	$69,162
Liberal	Lonny McKague	6,001	19.6	+5.2	$44,913
New Democratic	Robert Stephen Stringer	4,202	13.7	-1.9	$15,033
Green	Sigfredo Gonzalez	537	1.8	–	
Christian Heritage	Robert Thomas Jacobson	191	0.6	–	$194
Total valid votes		30,636	100.0		–
Total rejected ballots		83	0.3	-0.1	
Turnout		30,719	63.0	0.0	

2000 Canadian federal election
Party	Candidate	Votes	%	±%	Expenditures
Alliance	Roy Bailey	19,278	63.3	+22.1	$32,614
New Democratic	Tom Cameron	4,755	15.6	-3.0	$12,747
Liberal	Myles Fuchs	4,371	14.3	-12.9	$11,644
Progressive Conservative	Larry Gabruch	2,060	6.8	-6.2	–
Total valid votes		30,464	100.0		–
Total rejected ballots		98	0.3	-0.1	
Turnout		30,562	63.0	+4.0	

1997 Canadian federal election
Party	Candidate	Votes	%	±%	Expenditures
Reform	Roy Bailey	13,732	41.2	+10.5	$24,042
Liberal	Bernie Collins	9,077	27.2	-5.0	$42,840
New Democratic	Gary Lake	6,209	18.6	+2.1	$26,063
Progressive Conservative	Greg Douglas	4,333	13.0	-2.0	$11,530
Total valid votes		33,351	100.0		–
Total rejected ballots		128	0.4		
Turnout		33,479	67.0		

1993 Canadian federal election
Party	Candidate	Votes	%	±%
Liberal	Bernie Collins	10,829	32.2	+13.2
Reform	Doug Heimlick	10,330	30.7	–
New Democratic	Caroline Saxon	5,539	16.5	-16.0
Progressive Conservative	Earl Silcox	5,051	15.0	-31.8
Independent	Art Mainil	918	2.7	–
Independent	David Davis	701	2.1	–
Canada Party	David Bouchard	271	0.8	–
Total valid votes		33,639	100.0	

1988 Canadian federal election
Party	Candidate	Votes	%
Progressive Conservative	Lenard Gustafson	17,200	46.8
New Democratic	Jeff Sample	11,924	32.5
Liberal	Mike Bauche	6,965	19.0
Confederation of Regions	Kelvin G. Rutten	652	1.8
Total valid votes		36,741	100.0

== See also ==
- List of Canadian electoral districts
- Historical federal electoral districts of Canada
