= Travis Patron =

Canadian white nationalist

- Born: 1990 or 1991 (age 35–36)
- Organization: Canadian Nationalist Party (2017–2021)
- Convictions: Assault causing bodily harm (×2, August 2022); Wilful promotion of hatred (October 2022); Criminal harassment (February 2024); Impersonating a police officer (November 2024)
- Penalty: 18 months in jail (August 2022); 1 year in jail (October 2022)

Travis Patron is a Canadian white nationalist who was the leader of the Canadian Nationalist Party from its founding in 2017 until his arrest in 2021. Since 2022, Patron has been convicted of several charges related to racially-motivated crimes, including assault causing bodily harm, impersonating a police officer, criminal harassment, and willful promotion of hate. He appealed his convictions, but his arguments were rejected by the Court of Appeal for Saskatchewan and then the Supreme Court of Canada.

== Political career ==
Travis Patron founded the Canadian Nationalist Party (CNP) on June 1, 2017. He announced later in November his intention to register the CNP as a federal political party and field candidates in the 2019 federal election. On November 26, he started a cross-country tour in Toronto.

In September 2018, Patron contacted Maxime Bernier, leader of the People's Party of Canada, "to see if there would be any interest in possibly co-operating with the Canadian Nationalist Party." Bernier declined any further discussions with Patron.

Patron ran unsuccessfully in the 2019 federal election as the CNP candidate for Souris—Moose Mountain, the electoral district containing his hometown of Redvers in Saskatchewan.

== Criminal convictions ==
The Royal Canadian Mounted Police (RCMP) launched a hate crime investigation against Patron in June 2019, after Ottawa-based human rights lawyer Richard Warman filed a formal criminal complaint about a video Patron uploaded to YouTube warning of a "parasitic tribe" controlling Canadian institutions and calling for their permanent removal from Canada.

Shortly after the 2019 election, Patron was charged with aggravated assault, assault causing bodily harm and breach of probation, after attacking two women in Regina, Saskatchewan, who were sent to hospital for their injuries.

A complaint was filed with the RCMP against Patron by the Friends of Simon Wiesenthal Center on July 15, 2020. In their complaint they claim that a post on the party's Facebook page constitutes hate speech. Patron was arrested by the RCMP and charged with willful promotion of hate on February 17, 2021, in connection to the complaint.

On August 23, 2022, Patron was sentenced concurrently to 18-months in jail for two counts of assault causing bodily harm, in relation to his assault of two women in 2019. However, because Patron received time served credit for the amount of time he spent in custody, the sentence was considered served. On October 20, 2022, Patron was sentenced to one year in jail for willfully promoting hatred against Jewish people and ordered to refrain from posting about them for a year after the sentence ends.

In August 2023, Patron was charged with two counts of impersonating a police officer in Saskatchewan, two counts of failing to comply with court-ordered conditions and one of criminal harassment. In the first incident, police said he approached a woman and accused her of abducting her own mixed-race child. She sought help in a nearby hotel and he followed her, caused a disturbance and fled when bystanders intervened. Police also investigated an incident in which he approached a woman on the University of Saskatchewan campus, claimed to be a peace officer and offered to escort her – she declined his offer and he left. The university issued a warning about him trespassing and impersonating staff, and asked individuals who saw him on campus to contact protective services. He faced a third charge of impersonating a police officer after he harassed a couple at the Midtown Plaza in Saskatoon on July 20, 2023. The boyfriend was an off-duty RCMP officer of Iraqi descent.

Patron was convicted of criminal harassment in February 2024 and impersonating a police officer in November 2024, in relation to his harassment of the mother and child. He was convicted again of the former charge in relation to his harassment of the couple, as well as the latter charge in relation to his attempt to accompany a woman at the University of Saskatchewan. Patron appealed his convictions to the Court of Appeal for Saskatchewan and the Supreme Court of Canada, but his arguments were rejected in June 2025 and February 2026, respectively.

Patron was arrested for wilful promotion of hate speech once again on April 14, 2026, this time by the Carlyle RCMP. This followed "a report of hateful material being posted online in a public forum" filed against Patron just a year earlier, on April 16, 2025.
