= Roy Bailey (politician) =

Canadian politician (1928–2018)

Roy H. Bailey

Member of the Canadian Parliament for Souris—Moose Mountain
- In office June 2, 1997 – June 28, 2004
- Preceded by: Bernie Collins (Lib.)
- Succeeded by: Ed Komarnicki (Con.)

MLA for Rosetown-Elrose
- In office 1975–1978
- Preceded by: riding created
- Succeeded by: Herbert Swan (PC)

Personal details
- Born: December 16, 1928 Radville, Saskatchewan, Canada
- Died: December 13, 2018 (aged 89) Bengough, Saskatchewan, Canada
- Party: Conservative Party (2004–2018, his death)
- Other political affiliations: Provincial: Social Credit (until 1971), Progressive Conservative (1971–1978); Federal: Reform Party of Canada (1997–2000), Canadian Reform Conservative Alliance (2000–2004)
- Occupation: Educational administrator, farmer, teacher

Roy Hardeman Bailey (December 16, 1928 – December 13, 2018) was a Canadian politician.

Formerly a member of the Social Credit Party of Saskatchewan, Bailey joined the Progressive Conservative Party of Saskatchewan when the Social Credit and PC parties merged under the PC name in 1971.

Bailey ran for the leadership of the Saskatchewan PC Party in 1973, placing second to Dick Collver.

He was elected to the Legislative Assembly of Saskatchewan in the 1975 provincial election as the Progressive Conservative Member of the Legislative Assembly for Rosetown-Elrose, and served until 1978.

Bailey was a school board trustee in the Borderland School Division (since consolidated into the Prairie South School Division) from 1984 to 1993.

He was elected to the House of Commons in 1997, representing the riding of Souris—Moose Mountain for the Reform Party of Canada and its successor, the Canadian Alliance, until 2004. He served as the Veterans Affairs critic for the Alliance. He did not seek re-election in the 2004 election.

Bailey was also variously an educational administrator, a farmer, and a teacher. He died on December 13, 2018.

== Electoral history ==
2000 Canadian federal election: Souris—Moose Mountain
Party	Candidate	Votes	%	±%	Expenditures
Alliance	Roy Bailey	19,278	63.3	+22.1	$32,614
New Democratic	Tom Cameron	4,755	15.6	-3.0	$12,747
Liberal	Myles Fuchs	4,371	14.3	-12.9	$11,644
Progressive Conservative	Larry Gabruch	2,060	6.8	-6.2	–
Total valid votes		30,464	100.0		–
Total rejected ballots		98	0.3	-0.1	
Turnout		30,562	63.0	+4.0	

1997 Canadian federal election: Souris—Moose Mountain
Party	Candidate	Votes	%	±%	Expenditures
Reform	Roy Bailey	13,732	41.2	+10.5	$24,042
Liberal	Bernie Collins	9,077	27.2	-5.0	$42,840
New Democratic	Gary Lake	6,209	18.6	+2.1	$26,063
Progressive Conservative	Greg Douglas	4,333	13.0	-2.0	$11,530
Total valid votes		33,351	100.0		–
Total rejected ballots		128	0.4		
Turnout		33,479	67.0		
