= Ed Komarnicki =

Canadian politician and lawyer

Edward Komarnicki

Member of Parliament for Souris—Moose Mountain
- In office June 28, 2004 – October 19, 2015
- Preceded by: Roy H. Bailey
- Succeeded by: Robert Kitchen

Chair of the Standing Committee on Human Resources
- In office June 21, 2011 – October 23, 2013
- Minister: Jason Kenney
- Preceded by: Candice Bergen
- Succeeded by: Phil McColeman

Personal details
- Born: November 18, 1949 (age 76) Cudworth, Saskatchewan, Canada
- Party: Conservative
- Spouse: Sally Komarnicki
- Profession: lawyer

Edward "Ed" Komarnicki (born November 18, 1949) is a Canadian politician and lawyer.

Born in Cudworth, Saskatchewan, Komarnicki was elected into the House of Commons of Canada in the 2004 Canadian federal election as the Conservative Party of Canada candidate in the riding of Souris—Moose Mountain. He was elected by nearly 3,000 votes over former premier Grant Devine who was running as an independent. Komarnicki was re-elected in each subsequent election, in 2006, 2008 and 2011, each time with a larger percentage of votes.

During late February 2013, Komarnicki announced that he would not stand for re-election at the next federal election.

== Career in the House ==
In October 2004, Komarnicki became a member of the Standing Committee on Human Resources, Skills Development, Social Development and the Status of Persons with Disabilities (HUMA). In 2006 he became the Parliamentary Secretary to the Minister of Citizenship and Immigration, and a member of the Standing Committee on Citizenship and Immigration. In 2008 he returned to his previous file as the new Parliamentary Secretary to the Minister of Human Resources, Skills Development and the Status of Persons with Disabilities. This change also meant returning to the HUMA committee. After winning re-election in the 2011 General Election, Komarnicki became chair of the HUMA committee.

== Electoral record ==
2011 Canadian federal election: Souris—Moose Mountain
| Party | Candidate | Votes | % | ±% | Expenditures |
|---|---|---|---|---|---|
| Conservative | Ed Komarnicki | 21,598 | 74.0 | +3.5 | $45,028 |
| New Democratic | Allan Arthur | 5,461 | 18.7 | +1.9 | $11,460 |
| Liberal | Gerald Borrowman | 1,236 | 4.2 | –2.5 | $30,532 |
| Green | Bob Deptuck | 898 | 3.1 | –2.9 | $483 |
| Total valid votes | | 29,193 | 100.0 | | – |
| Total rejected ballots | | 77 | 0.3 | 0.0 | |
| Turnout | | 29,270 | 64.0 | +3 | |
| Eligible voters | | 46,242 | – | – | |

2008 Canadian federal election: Souris—Moose Mountain
| Party | Candidate | Votes | % | ±% | Expenditures |
|---|---|---|---|---|---|
| Conservative | Ed Komarnicki | 19,293 | 70.5 | +7.7 | $43,314 |
| New Democratic | Raquel Fletcher | 4,599 | 16.8 | +2.9 | $6,182 |
| Liberal | Marlin Belt | 1,834 | 6.7 | -11.8 | – |
| Green | Bob Deptuck | 1,643 | 6.0 | +1.3 | $2,093 |
| Total valid votes/expense limit | | 27,369 | 100.0 | | $89,152 |
| Total rejected ballots | | 90 | 0.3 | 0.0 | |
| Turnout | | 27,459 | 57 | -8 | |

2006 Canadian federal election: Souris—Moose Mountain
| Party | Candidate | Votes | % | ±% | Expenditures |
|---|---|---|---|---|---|
| Conservative | Ed Komarnicki | 19,282 | 62.8 | +25.9 | $40,537 |
| Liberal | Lonny McKague | 5,681 | 18.5 | -1.1 | $42,576 |
| New Democratic | Michael Haukeness | 4,284 | 14.0 | +0.2 | $6,329 |
| Green | Matthew Smith | 1,448 | 4.7 | +3.0 | $518 |
| Total valid votes | | 30,695 | 100.0 | | – |
| Total rejected ballots | | 83 | 0.3 | 0.0 | |
| Turnout | | 30,778 | 65.3 | +2.3 | |

2004 Canadian federal election: Souris—Moose Mountain
| Party | Candidate | Votes | % | ±% | Expenditures |
|---|---|---|---|---|---|
| Conservative | Ed Komarnicki | 11,306 | 36.9 | -33.1 | $52,238 |
| Independent | Grant Devine | 8,399 | 27.4 | – | $69,162 |
| Liberal | Lonny McKague | 6,001 | 19.6 | +5.2 | $44,913 |
| New Democratic | Robert Stephen Stringer | 4,202 | 13.7 | -1.9 | $15,033 |
| Green | Sigfredo Gonzalez | 537 | 1.8 | – | |
| Christian Heritage | Robert Thomas Jacobson | 191 | 0.6 | – | $194 |
| Total valid votes | | 30,636 | 100.0 | | – |
| Total rejected ballots | | 83 | 0.3 | -0.1 | |
| Turnout | | 30,719 | 63.0 | 0.0 | |
