= James Thomas Brown =

Canadian politician

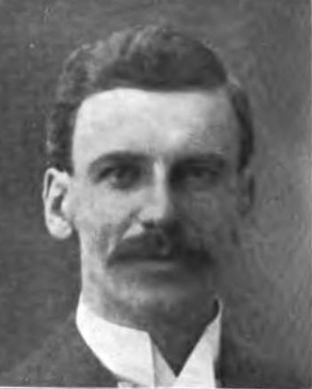

Member of the Legislative Assembly of Saskatchewan
- In office 1905–1908
- Constituency: Souris

Personal details
- Born: October 22, 1871; Huntingdon, Quebec
- Died: April 28, 1957 (aged 85); Regina, Saskatchewan
- Political party: Provincial Rights
- Spouse: Alice M. Lewis (m. 1922)
- Education: McGill University
- Occupation: Jurist, politician

James Thomas Brown (October 22, 1871 – April 28, 1957) was a lawyer, judge, and political figure in Saskatchewan. He represented Souris in the Legislative Assembly of Saskatchewan from 1905 to 1908 as a Provincial Rights Party member.

== Early life and education ==
He was born in Huntingdon, Quebec, the son of Samuel Brown and Margaret White, and was educated there and at McGill University. Brown moved to Manitoba in 1833 and to Saskatchewan in 1896.

== Career ==
He practised law in Moosomin, Saskatchewan, and later served as Crown Prosecutor for Assiniboia district. In 1922, he married Alice M. Lewis.

Brown was an unsuccessful candidate for a seat in the House of Commons in 1908. He later lived in Regina. Brown served as a puisne judge for the Supreme Court of Saskatchewan. He was named chief justice for the Saskatchewan Court of King's Bench in 1918.

1908 Canadian federal election: Qu'Appelle
Party	Candidate	Votes	%
Conservative	Richard Stuart Lake	3,833	50.3
Liberal	J.T. Brown	3,781	49.7
Total valid votes		7,614	100.0

Brown died in Regina on April 28, 1957, at the age of 85.
