= John Burton (Canadian politician) =

Canadian politician (1927–2022)

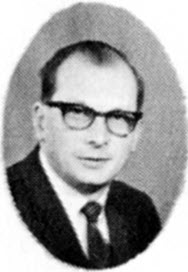

MP for Regina East
- In office September 9, 1968 – September 1, 1972
- Preceded by: first member
- Succeeded by: Jim Balfour

Personal details
- Born: John Stratford Burton; November 27, 1927 Humboldt, Saskatchewan, Canada
- Died: December 9, 2022 (aged 95)
- Party: New Democratic Party
- Parent: Joseph William Burton
- Occupation: bookkeeper, researcher, public servant, farmer, agricultural economist, instructor, author

John Stratford Burton (November 27, 1927 – December 9, 2022) was a Canadian politician who represented the electoral district of Regina East in the House of Commons of Canada, from 1968 to 1972. He was a member of the Cooperative Commonwealth Federation and its successor, the New Democratic Party.

Burton was also the CCF's candidate in Melville in the 1957 and 1958 elections, and the NDP's candidate in Melville in 1962, in Regina City in 1965, in Regina East in 1972 and 1974, and in Wascana in 1997, but was not successful in those elections.

== Life and career ==
John Burton grew up on a farm outside Humboldt, Saskatchewan (Burton Lake), studied at the University of Saskatchewan, the London School of Economics, and the University of Regina, was elected to Parliament, and played a major role in Saskatchewan's 1975 decision to acquire potash-producing facilities. He was a member of the Board of Directors of the Crown-owned Potash Corporation of Saskatchewan from 1975 to 1982.

In May 2014, Burton and the University of Regina Press published the book Potash: An Inside Account Of Saskatchewan's Pink Gold, an insider account of the purchase of 40% of the potash industry of Saskatchewan in the 1970s by the NDP Government of Allan Blakeney. Burton died on December 9, 2022.
