= Sandy Cushin =

Canadian television host

Sandy Cushon (born in Oxbow, Saskatchewan) is best known as former host of agricultural program Country Canada on CBC Television, which he hosted between 1975 and 2000.

He also hosted Points West for CBC Winnipeg.
