= Richard Stuart Lake =

Canadian politician (1860–1950)

The Honourable Sir Richard Stuart Lake KCMG
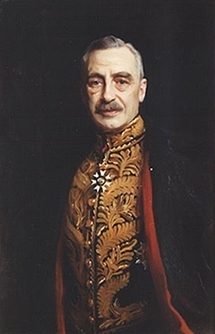

Member of the Legislative Assembly of the Northwest Territories for Grenfell
- In office November 4, 1898 – October 9, 1900
- Preceded by: District established
- Succeeded by: Himself
- In office March 22, 1901 – November 3, 1904
- Preceded by: Himself
- Succeeded by: District abolished

Member of the Canadian Parliament for Qu'Appelle
- In office November 3, 1904 – September 21, 1911
- Preceded by: Riding established
- Succeeded by: Levi Thomson

3rd Lieutenant Governor of Saskatchewan
- In office October 6, 1915 – February 17, 1921
- Monarch: George V
- Governors General: The Duke of Connaught and Strathearn; The Duke of Devonshire
- Premier: Thomas Walter Scott; William Melville Martin
- Preceded by: George W. Brown
- Succeeded by: Henry William Newlands

Personal details
- Born: July 10, 1860 Preston, Lancashire, England
- Died: April 23, 1950 (aged 89) Victoria, British Columbia, Canada
- Party: Conservative
- Spouse: Dorothy Marion Schreiber Fletcher
- Relatives: Percy Lake (brother)

Sir Richard Stuart Lake, KCMG (July 10, 1860 – April 23, 1950) was an English-born Canadian territorial provincial and federal level politician from Saskatchewan, Canada.

== Territorial politics ==
Born in Preston, Lancashire, England, Lake was elected to the Legislative Assembly of the North-West Territories for the Grenfell district in the 1898 Northwest Territories general election. In 1900 he vacated his seat to run in Assiniboia East in the 1900 Canadian federal election.

After being defeated in his first attempt at federal politics he ran for his old seat and was re-elected as the MLA in a by-election on March 22, 1901.

Lake was acclaimed to his second term in office in the 1902 Northwest Territories general election. He held that post until the 1904 Canadian federal election when he vacated his seat to make a second run at Federal politics.

== Federal politics ==
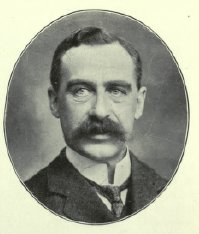
The Hon. Richard Stuart Lake

Lake was elected as a Member of the House of Commons of Canada in his second run at Federal politics in the 1904 Canadian federal election in the new Qu'Appelle federal electoral district.

He was re-elected to a second term in the 1908 Canadian federal election winning a hotly contested election by just a 100 votes.

In the 1911 Canadian federal election he was defeated by Liberal Levi Thomson and never returned to federal politics.

== Lieutenant-Governor of Saskatchewan ==
After being defeated in the Federal election, Lake went to work for the Saskatchewan Public Service Commission, he held that job until he was appointed as the third lieutenant governor of Saskatchewan on October 18, 1915. He served for six years, until February 17, 1921, when he was offered the possibility of extending his royal commission; however, he refused.

== Late life ==
He moved to Victoria, British Columbia after his career in politics and lived the rest of his life there.

He and his wife, Dorothy, were aboard the SS Athenia when it was torpedoed on September 3, 1939 and survived.

He died on April 23, 1950.

== Electoral record ==
1911 Canadian federal election: Qu'Appelle
Party	Candidate	Votes	%	±%
Liberal	Levi Thomson	4,298	52.6	+2.9
Conservative	Richard Stuart Lake	3,874	47.4	-2.9
Total valid votes		8,172	100.0	

1908 Canadian federal election: Qu'Appelle
Party	Candidate	Votes	%
Conservative	Richard Stuart Lake	3,833	50.3
Liberal	J.T. Brown	3,781	49.7
Total valid votes		7,614	100.0
