= Edward McCullough =

Canadian politician and farmer

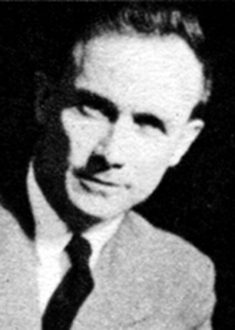

Member of Parliament for Assiniboia
- In office June 1945 – June 1949
- Preceded by: Jesse Pickard Tripp
- Succeeded by: Hazen Argue

Member of Parliament for Moose Mountain
- In office August 1953 – March 1958
- Preceded by: John James Smith
- Succeeded by: Richard Southam

Personal details
- Born: Edward George McCullough; 28 May 1909 Moose Jaw, Saskatchewan, Canada
- Died: 17 June 1994 (aged 85)
- Party: Co-operative Commonwealth Federation
- Profession: farmer

Edward George McCullough (28 May 1909 – 17 June 1994) was a Canadian politician and farmer. McCullough was a Co-operative Commonwealth Federation member of the House of Commons of Canada. He was born in Moose Jaw, Saskatchewan and became a farmer.

He was first elected at the Assiniboia riding in the 1945 general election. In the 1949 election McCullough became a candidate at Moose Mountain but was defeated by John James Smith of the Liberal party. McCullough unseated Smith there in the 1953 election then was re-elected in 1957. McCullough was defeated in 1958 by Richard Southam of the Progressive Conservative party. McCullough was also unsuccessful in unseating Southam in the 1962 election, under the New Democratic Party to which the CCF was renamed by that time.
