= Alvin Hamilton =

Canadian politician

The Right Honourable Alvin Hamilton PC
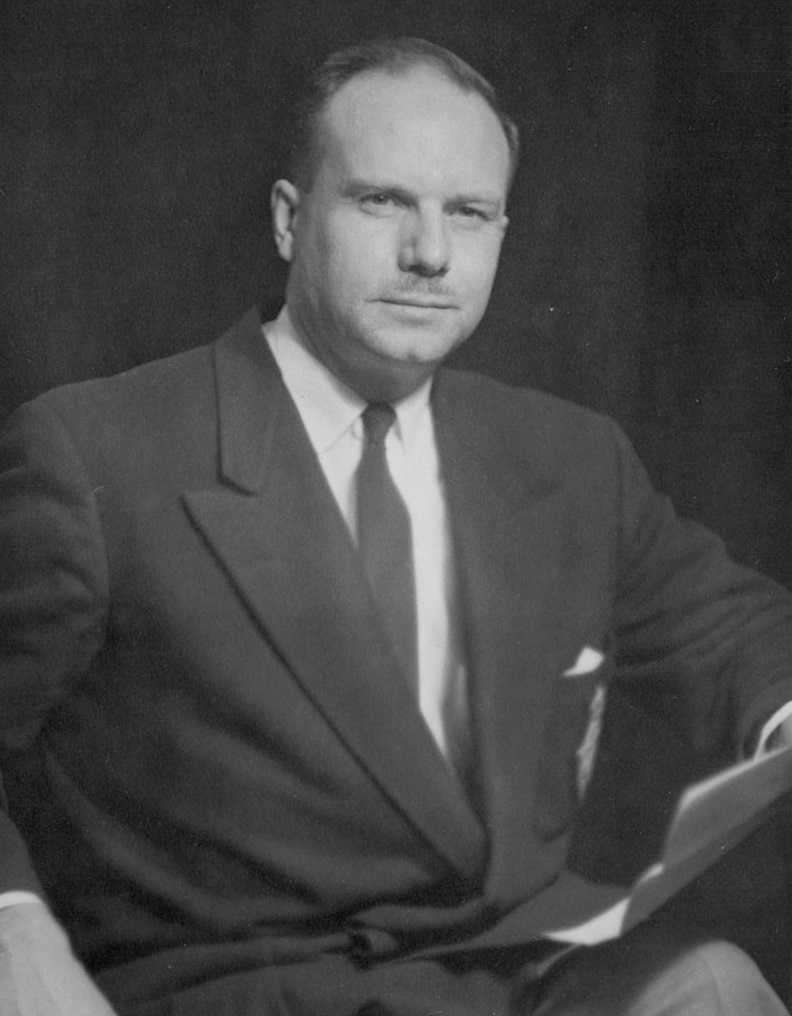

Minister of Agriculture
- In office October 11, 1960 – April 22, 1963
- Prime Minister: John Diefenbaker
- Preceded by: Douglas Harkness
- Succeeded by: Harry Hays

Member of Parliament for Qu'Appelle—Moose Mountain
- In office October 30, 1972 – November 20, 1988
- Preceded by: Richard Southam
- Succeeded by: Riding abolished

Member of Parliament for Qu'Appelle
- In office June 10, 1957 – June 24, 1968
- Preceded by: Henry Mang
- Succeeded by: Riding dissolved

Personal details
- Born: Francis Alvin George Hamilton; March 30, 1912 Kenora, Ontario, Canada
- Died: June 29, 2004 (aged 92) Manotick, Ontario, Canada
- Party: Progressive Conservative
- Education: University of Saskatchewan
- Occupation: Soldier, politician

Francis Alvin George Hamilton PC (March 30, 1912 – June 29, 2004) was a Canadian politician. Hamilton led the Progressive Conservative Party of Saskatchewan from 1949 until he was elected to the House of Commons of Canada in the 1957 general election. That election brought the federal Progressive Conservative Party of Canada to power under John Diefenbaker. He served as Minister of Northern Affairs and National Resources, 1957 to 1960. He promoted a new vision of northern development. He was Minister of Agriculture, 1960 to 1963, where he promoted wheat sales to China.

== Life and career ==
Born in Kenora, Ontario, he received a Bachelor of Arts degree in 1938 from the University of Saskatchewan. During World War II, he served with the Royal Canadian Air Force as a navigator and flight lieutenant. He was awarded the Burma Star Decoration.

After the war, he ran three times unsuccessfully as the Progressive Conservative candidate for the Canadian House of Commons in the 1945, 1949, and 1953 elections. He was elected in 1957 in the riding of Qu'Appelle and re-elected 4 more times in 1958, 1962, 1963, and 1965. He ran in the riding of Regina East in the 1968 federal election, and lost by 192 votes to the New Democrat candidate. He was elected again in the 1972 federal election in the riding of Qu'Appelle—Moose Mountain and was re-elected 4 more times in 1974, 1979, 1980, and 1984. He retired in 1988.

Hamilton served as Minister of Northern Affairs and National Resources in the Diefenbaker cabinet from 1957 to 1960, supporting a new vision of northern development. From 1960 to the 1963 election, when the Diefenbaker government was defeated, Hamilton served as Minister of Agriculture, pioneering wheat sales to the People's Republic of China. He was a candidate at the 1967 PC leadership convention, making it to the fourth ballot before dropping out.

In 1992, Hamilton was granted the honorific style of "The Right Honourable" by Elizabeth II in honour of his service to Canada. This is a rare honour for someone who did not serve as Prime Minister of Canada, Chief Justice of Canada or Governor General of Canada.

After Hamilton retired from politics in 1988, he lived a relatively secluded life in the Ottawa-area town of Manotick, where he lived until his death in 2004. On June 28, 2007, the newly refurbished Government of Canada Building in downtown Regina, Saskatchewan, was officially named the Francis Alvin George Hamilton Building. Also, one of the reception rooms at the Embassy of Canada to China in Beijing is called the Alvin Hamilton Room.

== Electoral record ==
1965 Canadian federal election: Qu'Appelle
Party	Candidate	Votes	%	±%
Progressive Conservative	Alvin Hamilton	9,579	57.5	-2.6
Liberal	Charlie Lenz	4,033	24.2	-0.1
New Democratic	Clif Argue	2,658	16.0	+4.5
Social Credit	Wilfred Totten	375	2.3	-1.9
Total valid votes		16,645	100.0	

1963 Canadian federal election: Qu'Appelle
Party	Candidate	Votes	%	±%
Progressive Conservative	Alvin Hamilton	10,690	60.2	+1.7
Liberal	L.L. Prefontaine	4,312	24.3	+0.8
New Democratic	Norman Kennedy	2,028	11.4	-0.6
Social Credit	Edwin Fredlund	729	4.1	-2.0
Total valid votes		17,759	100.0	

1962 Canadian federal election: Qu'Appelle
Party	Candidate	Votes	%	±%
Progressive Conservative	Alvin Hamilton	10,680	58.5	-0.6
Liberal	L.L. Prefontaine	4,291	23.5	-1.0
New Democratic	Harry E. Richardson	2,188	12.0	-4.5
Social Credit	Herman A. Hauser	1,113	6.1	
Total valid votes		18,272	100.0	

Note: NDP vote is compared to CCF vote in 1958 election.

1958 Canadian federal election: Qu'Appelle
Party	Candidate	Votes	%	±%
Progressive Conservative	Alvin Hamilton	10,514	59.0	+24.8
Liberal	Thomas Kearns	4,357	24.5	-5.9
Co-operative Commonwealth	Norman Kennedy	2,941	16.5	-7.1
Total valid votes		17,812	100.0	

1957 Canadian federal election: Qu'Appelle
Party	Candidate	Votes	%	±%
Progressive Conservative	Alvin Hamilton	6,217	34.2	+7.1
Liberal	Henry Philip Mang	5,512	30.4	-8.1
Co-operative Commonwealth	Norman Kennedy	4,279	23.6	-7.3
Social Credit	David Isman	2,150	11.8	+8.3
Total valid votes		18,158	100.0	

1953 Canadian federal election: Qu'Appelle
Party	Candidate	Votes	%	±%
Liberal	Henry Philip Mang	6,988	38.5	-6.3
Co-operative Commonwealth	Lawrence Irwin Hockley	5,612	30.9	-7.0
Progressive Conservative	Alvin Hamilton	4,930	27.1	+9.7
Social Credit	Anton Edward Kovatch	644	3.5	
Total valid votes		18,174	100.0	

Party political offices
Preceded by Rupert Ramsay	Saskatchewan Progressive Conservative Party Leader; 1949–1957	Succeeded by Martin Pederson
Parliament of Canada
Preceded by Henry Philip Mang	Member of Parliament Qu'Appelle; 1957–1968	Succeeded by District Abolished
Preceded by Richard Southam	Member of Parliament Qu'Appelle—Moose Mountain; 1972–1988	Succeeded by District Abolished
Political offices
Preceded by Douglas Harkness	Minister of Northern Affairs and National Resources; 1957–1960	Succeeded by Walter Gilbert Dinsdale
