= Oxbow, Saskatchewan =

Town in Saskatchewan, Canada

Oxbow
- Town
- Aerial view (2026)
- Motto: Progress with Pride
- Location in Saskatchewan Oxbow (Canada)
- Coordinates: 49°14′N 102°10′W
- Country: Canada
- Province: Saskatchewan
- Rural Municipality: Enniskillen No. 3
- First settled: 1882
- Incorporated: 1904

Government
  - Mayor: Doug Pierce
  - MP: Robert Kitchen (CPC)
  - MLA: Daryl Harrison (SaskParty)

Area
  - Total: 3.33 km^{2} (1.29 sq mi)

Population (2021)
  - Total: 1,286
  - Density: 386.6/km^{2} (1,001/sq mi)
- Postal code: S0C 2B0
- Area code: 306
- Highways: Highway 18
- Website: oxbow.ca

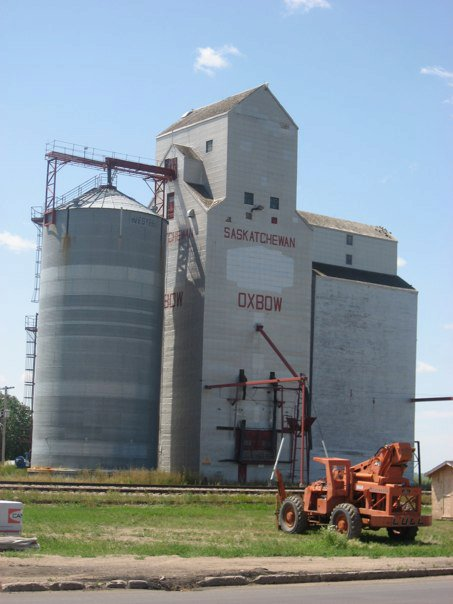
Former Saskatchewan Wheat Pool grain elevator on Saskatchewan Highway 18, which runs through Oxbow

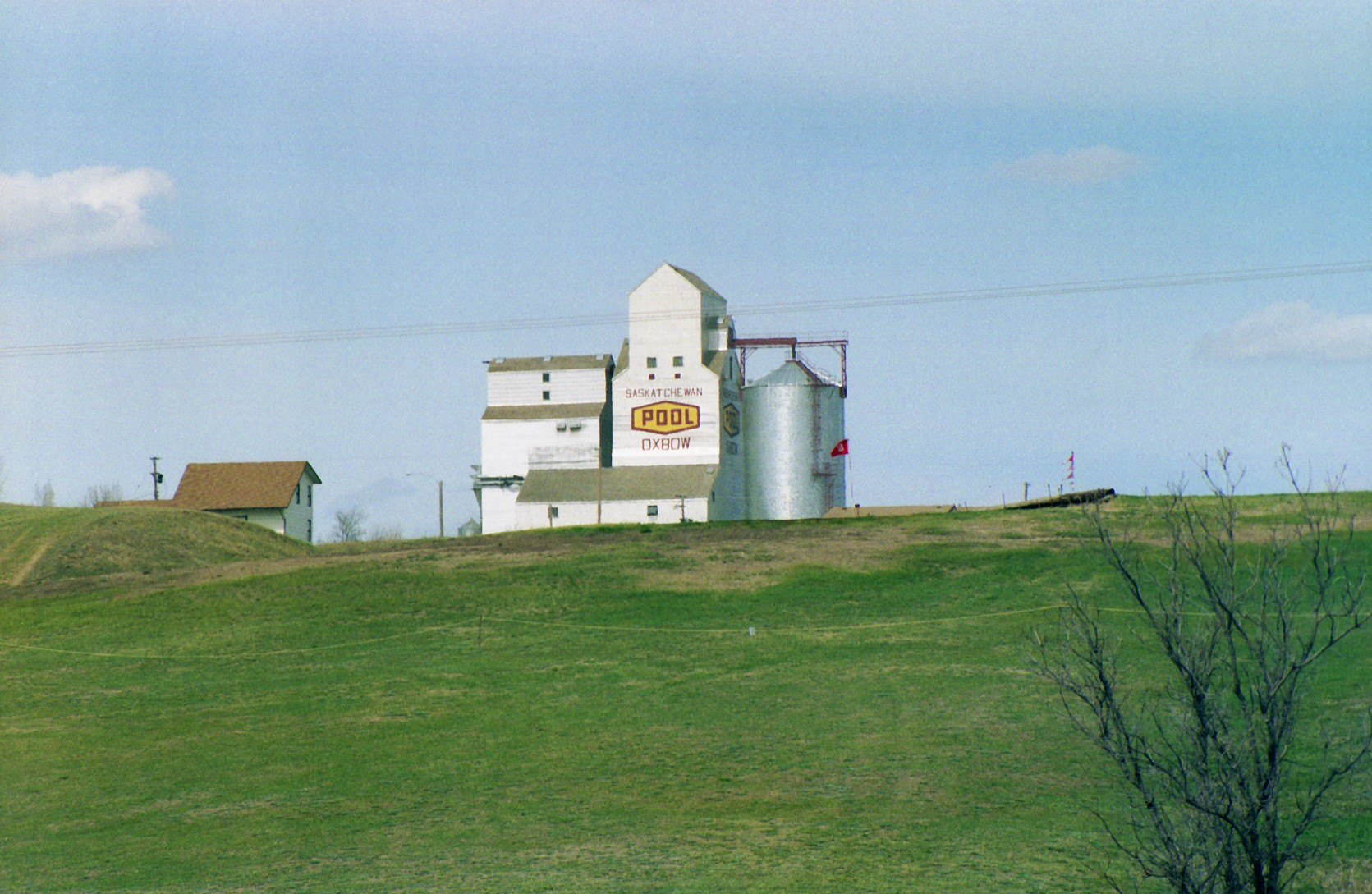
Oxbow grain elevator from a distance

Oxbow is a town in the southeast of the province of Saskatchewan, Canada. It is located on the Canadian Pacific Railway and on Highway 18. It is approximately 58 kilometres (36 mi) west of Saskatchewan's border with Manitoba and approximately 26 kilometres (16 mi) north of the Canada–US border with North Dakota.

The town's official motto is "Progress with Pride", but the town's weekly paper, the Oxbow Herald, has long included two other unofficial town mottoes on its masthead: "Queen of the Scenic Souris" (a reference to the Souris River, near which Oxbow is situated) and "Where Oil and Agriculture Meet" (a reference to the town's two major industries).

== History ==
The first settlers around Oxbow - mainly of English, Irish, and Scottish descent - began homesteading the area under the Dominion Lands Act in 1882. The town's weekly newspaper, the Oxbow Herald, was founded in 1903. The town was incorporated in 1904.

The town was named after the "oxbow" in the Souris River near which the town is situated. Etymologically, the word "oxbow", as applied to a river, is a metaphor for the oxbow worn by an ox.

The town grew rapidly in the years following incorporation, reaching a population of 678 in 1916. The town's population then hovered around 600-700 for the next several decades.

In the mid-1950s, oil companies began developing the oilfields around Oxbow. This set off a boom time, as personnel moved to Oxbow to work on drilling rigs and provide other services to the oil industry. As of 2010 there has been roughly 38,000 oil and gas wells around the surrounding area. Agriculture and oil remain the two major industries of the town.

On October 16, 1982, Royal Canadian Mounted Police (RCMP) Officer Cst. Butler was killed while on duty in Oxbow. A high speed pursuit had begun earlier west of Oxbow with the pursuit heading towards Oxbow. Cst. Butler had set up a road block with his RCMP cruiser across the roadway. A high speed collision occurred with Cst. Butler still in the vehicle. He later died of his injuries. Two occupants of the evading vehicle were also killed.

An EF3 tornado struck during the Tornado outbreak and derecho of June 9–11, 2026, the strongest in the province since 2010.

== Demographics ==
In the 2021 Census of Population conducted by Statistics Canada, Oxbow had a population of 1,286 living in 494 of its 574 total private dwellings, a change of −3.2% from its 2016 population of 1,328. With a land area of 3.33 km^{2} (1.29 sq mi), it had a population density of 386.2/km^{2} (1,000.2/sq mi) in 2021.

== Government ==
The mayor is Doug Pierce, who was elected by acclamation in October 2020.

== Education ==
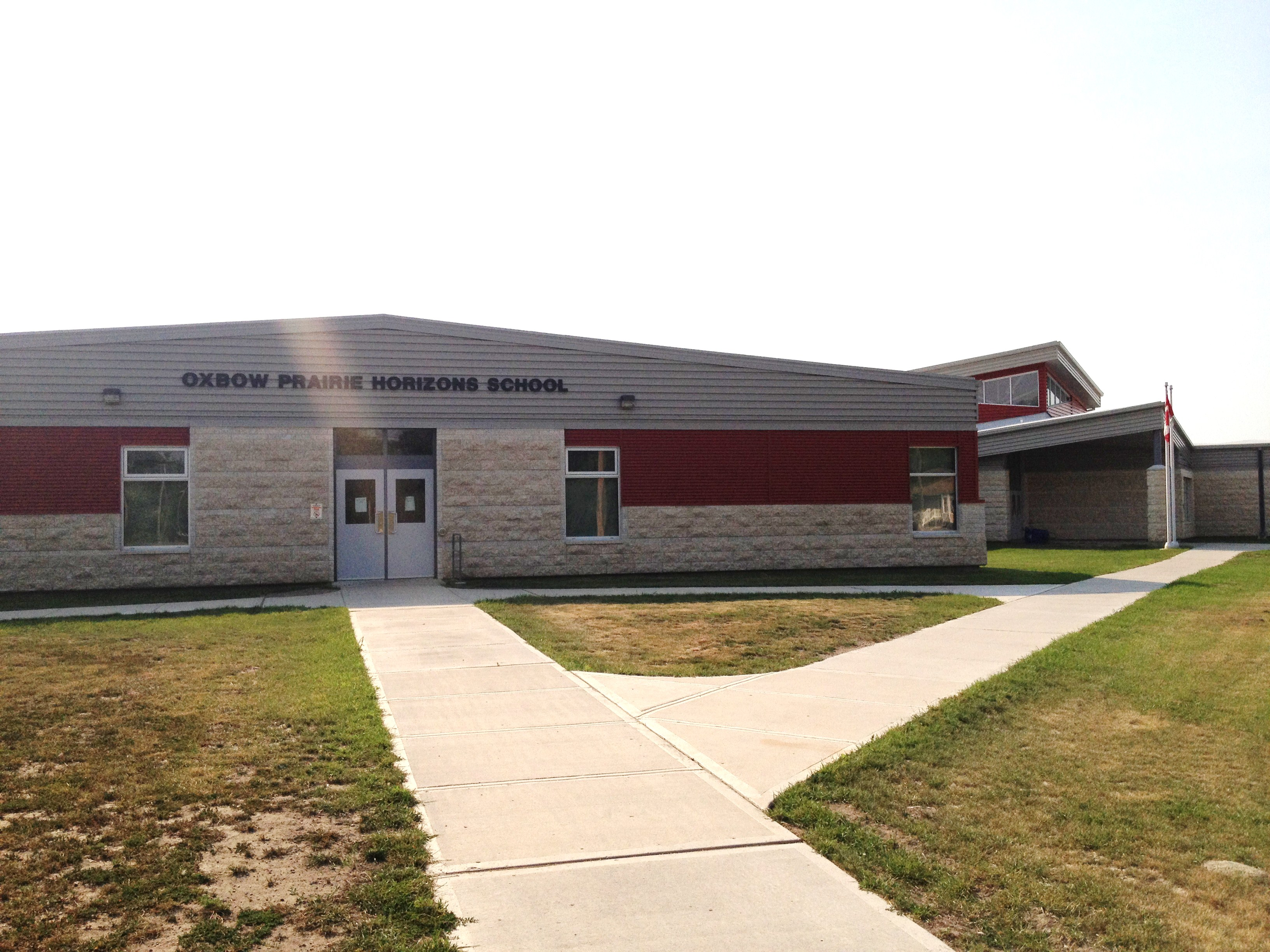
Oxbow Prairie Horizons School

The main school in Oxbow is Oxbow Prairie Horizons School (OPHS), a K–12 school, with a Preschool Program. Oxbow Prairie Horizons School opened in the 2010-11 school year.

Prior to the construction of Oxbow Prairie Horizons School, Oxbow had two schools: (1) Oxbow Prairie Heights School (OPHS), which taught Grades 6 through 12 (Oxbow Prairie Heights School opened in 1986, following renovations to the former Oxbow High School, which had taught Grades 7 through 12); and (2) Oxbow Elementary School, which was Grades K through 6 until 1985, and taught Grades K through 5 from 1985 to 2010.

In addition to the elementary school and high school, the Glenn McGuire School used to provide educational opportunities for intellectually and physically challenged students ranging in age from three to twenty-two years of age. As of September 1, 2008, the Glenn McGuire school has been demolished, and the physically challenged students have been integrated into the elementary school and high school.

== Sport and recreation ==
Sporting sites available in Oxbow include tennis courts, ball diamonds, a motocross track, an artificial-ice skating rink, a curling rink, and an outdoor swimming pool. Moose Creek Regional Park is located 7 kilometres (4.3 mi) north-west of Oxbow, and it offers camping, fishing, boating, water-skiing, a nine-hole golf course with grass greens, and driving and putting ranges.

Oxbow is home to the Oxbow Huskies. They play in the senior men's Big 6 Hockey League.

The Oxbow Chiefs of the Saskota Baseball League play at the local ball diamonds.

=== Bow Valley Park ===
Bow Valley Park is a campground with many recreational opportunities south of Oxbow along the Souris River. Some of the amenities and activities include ball diamonds, a pavilion, outdoor theatre, potable water, and a boat launch. The park is also home to the annual Bow Valley Jamboree. In 2011, the Souris River flooded destroying much of the park. It cost $300,000 and took almost six years to restore the park. The official grand reopening was in June of 2017.

== Literary references ==
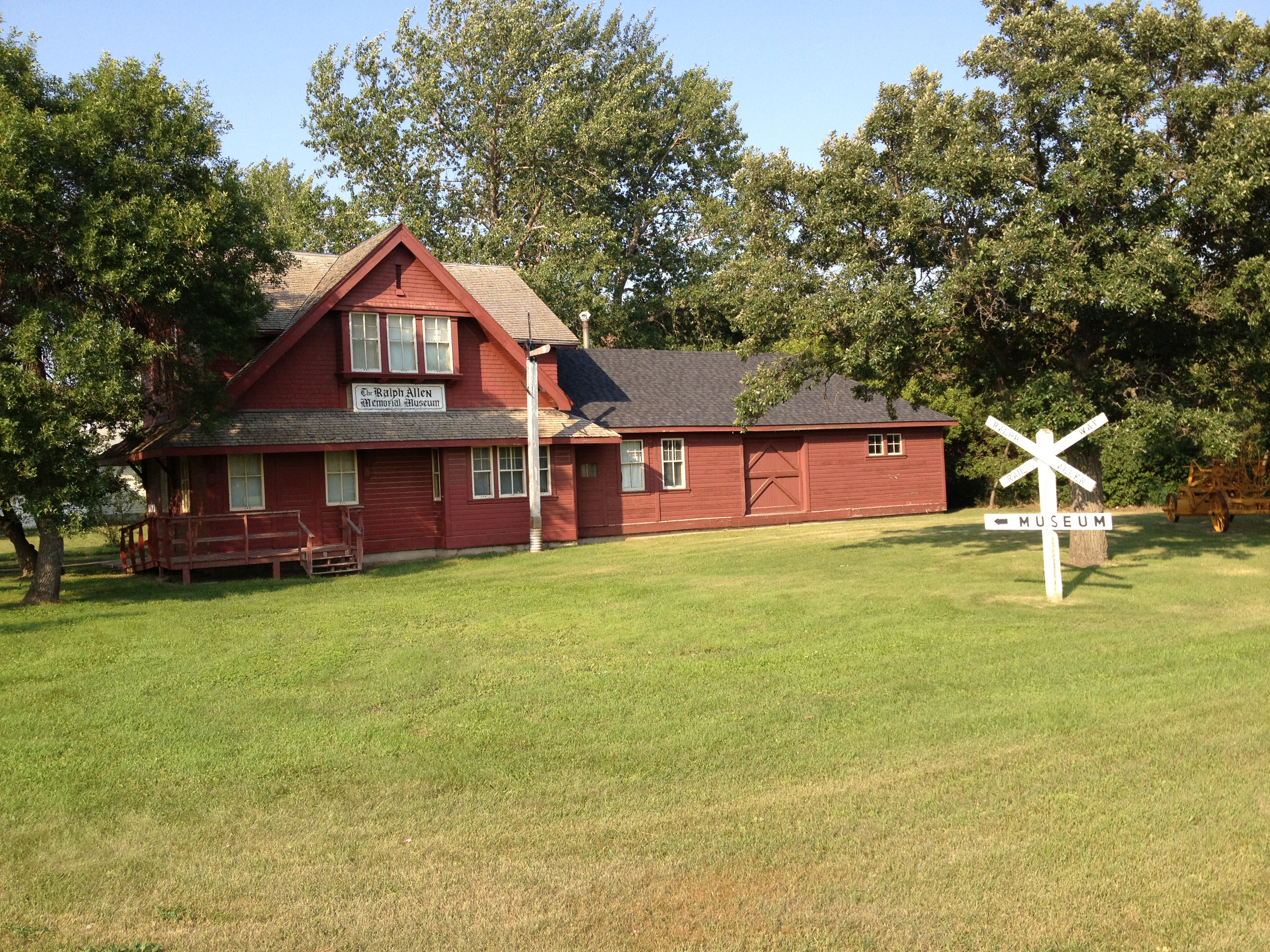
The Ralph Allen Memorial Museum, housed in the town's former train station

Canadian journalist Ralph Allen came from Oxbow. Allen was the author of several books, including the novel Peace River Country (1958) and a history of Canada during the period of the two world wars entitled Ordeal By Fire: Canada, 1910–1945 (1961). In 1967, Christina McCall Newman edited a collection of Allen's columns from Maclean's entitled The Man From Oxbow. Oxbow's town museum is named in Allen's honour.

During his time as Editor of Maclean's, Allen mentioned Oxbow several times in the magazine. The November 10, 1956, cover featured a full-colour illustration of the offices of the Oxbow Herald newspaper and showed owner Joe Pedlar at work.

There is also a reference to Oxbow in My Discovery of America by Farley Mowat (1985). The book is a memoir detailing why Mowat was denied entry to the US in 1985. In the Appendix, he points out that one of the reasons was that he had supported an Oxbow group that was opposed to nuclear weapons at the Minot Air Force Base.

Another reference to Oxbow can be found in Peter Newman's Mavericks: Canadian Rebels, Renegades and Anti-Heroes (2010), in the chapter recounting the history of the Bronfman family's early involvement with bootlegging during prohibition, prior to their establishment of the Seagram Company in Montreal.

Oxbow was also the target of an article by Edmonton author W. P. Kinsella. Kinsella was sent to Oxbow by Saturday Night magazine after Oxbow had been found to have Canada's highest per-capita murder rate. Years later, Kinsella followed up with a second article, again in Saturday Night.

== Notable people ==
- Ralph Allen — Editor of Maclean's
- Eric Berntson — Politician
- Lorna Brown — Artist
- Lindsay Carson — Retired NHL hockey player
- Sandy Cushon — Television Host for CBC Television
- Theoren Fleury — Retired NHL hockey player
- Andrew Irvine — Professor and dramatist at University of British Columbia
- Tanner Jeannot — NHL hockey player
- Reg Kerr — Retired NHL hockey player
- Chaelynn Kitz — Curler
- Marj Mitchell — World Curling Championships Curler
- Kris Porter — Retired professional hockey player
- Lanette Prediger — Canadian skeleton racer
- Archibald Riddell — Politician
- Richard Southam — Politician
- Jesse Pickard Tripp — Politician
- Frank B. Walsh — Ophthalmologist

== See also ==
- List of towns in Saskatchewan
