= Ernest Perley =

Canadian politician

Member of Parliament for Qu'Appelle
- In office July 1930 – June 1945

Personal details
- Born: Ernest Edward Perley; 23 December 1877 Maugerville, New Brunswick, Canada
- Died: 16 August 1948 (aged 70)
- Party: Liberal; Conservative; National Government
- Spouse(s): Orythia Louise Clint m. 19 November 1902
- Profession: Farmer

Ernest Edward Perley (23 December 1877 – 16 August 1948) was a Liberal, then Conservative, then National Government member of the House of Commons of Canada. He was born in Maugerville, New Brunswick and became a farmer.

Perley, the son of Senator William Dell Perley, attended public and secondary schools at Wolseley, then studied at Winnipeg's Wesley College.

He was a municipal councillor for Wolseley, Saskatchewan, becoming the community's mayor in 1921 and 1922.

He was first elected to Parliament at the Qu'Appelle riding in the 1930 general election with the Liberal party after making an unsuccessful attempt to win a seat there as a Conservative party candidate in 1921.

However, in the 1935 election, he switched back to the Conservatives and won re-election at Qu'Appelle. He was re-elected in 1940 when the Conservatives ran under the National Government banner. In the 1945 election, Perley (whose party had adopted the name Progressive Conservative) was defeated by Gladys Strum of the Co-operative Commonwealth Federation.

== Electoral record ==
1945 Canadian federal election: Qu'Appelle
Party	Candidate	Votes	%	±%
Co-operative Commonwealth	Gladys Strum	6,146	37.4	
Progressive Conservative	Ernest Perley	5,415	33.0	-21.9
Liberal	Gen. Andrew George Latta McNaughton	4,871	29.6	-15.5
Total valid votes		16,432	100.0	

Note: Progressive Conservative vote is compared to "National Government" vote in 1940 election. Social Credit vote is compared to New Democracy vote in 1940 election.

1940 Canadian federal election: Qu'Appelle
Party	Candidate	Votes	%	±%
National Government	Ernest Perley	8,236	54.9	+18.2
Liberal	James Alexander McCowan	6,775	45.1	+9.7
Total valid votes		15,011	100.0	

Note: "National Government" vote is compared to Conservative vote in 1935 election.

1935 Canadian federal election: Qu'Appelle
Party	Candidate	Votes	%	±%
Conservative	Ernest Perley	5,769	36.6	
Liberal	James Alexander McCowan	5,579	35.4	-17.9
Co-operative Commonwealth	John Frederick Herman	2,210	14.0	
Social Credit	Joseph Alois Thauberger	2,186	13.9	
Total valid votes		15,744	100.0	

1930 Canadian federal election: Qu'Appelle
Party	Candidate	Votes	%	±%
Liberal	Ernest Perley	7,888	53.3	
Liberal–Progressive	John Millar	6,905	46.7	-10.2
Total valid votes		14,793	100.0	

1921 Canadian federal election: Qu'Appelle
Party	Candidate	Votes	%
Progressive	John Millar	8,350	69.3
Conservative	Ernest Perley	3,705	30.7
Total valid votes		12,055	100.0
