= Richard Southam =

Canadian politician

- Official 1968 portrait

MP for Moose Mountain
- In office 1958–1968
- Preceded by: Ed McCullough
- Succeeded by: Constituency abolished

MP for Qu'Appelle—Moose Mountain
- In office 1968–1972
- Preceded by: Constituency established
- Succeeded by: Alvin Hamilton

Personal details
- Born: January 26, 1907 Oxbow, Saskatchewan, Canada
- Died: August 26, 1994 (aged 87)
- Party: Progressive Conservative Party
- Occupation: Theatre owner, businessman, locker plant operator

Richard Russell Southam (January 26, 1907 – August 26, 1994) was a Member of Parliament (MP) in the House of Commons of Canada. He represented the riding of Moose Mountain and later the newly created riding of Qu'Appelle—Moose Mountain, Saskatchewan. In June 1957, Southam lost to Edward George McCullough in the Moose Mountain riding. On March 31, 1958, he won the seat and retained it through the June 18, 1962, April 8, 1963, and November 8, 1965 general elections.
