= Qu'Appelle—Moose Mountain =

Former federal electoral district in Saskatchewan, Canada

Qu'Appelle—Moose Mountain was a federal electoral district in Saskatchewan, Canada, that was represented in the House of Commons of Canada from 1968 to 1988. This riding was created in 1966 from parts of Moose Mountain and Qu'Appelle ridings.

It consisted of a part of Saskatchewan lying south of the Qu'Appelle River and east of the 2nd meridian. It was abolished in 1987 when it was redistributed into Regina—Qu'Appelle and Souris—Moose Mountain ridings.

== Election results ==
1968 Canadian federal election
Party	Candidate	Votes
Progressive Conservative	SOUTHAM, Richard R.	12,429
New Democratic	GOODWIN, William F.	8,765
Liberal	ANDERSON, Dwight L.	8,299

1972 Canadian federal election
Party	Candidate	Votes
Progressive Conservative	HAMILTON, Alvin	14,707
New Democratic	BUCK, Frank	6,834
Liberal	BRECKENRIDGE, Gary	6,184
Social Credit	EDDY, Walton	392

1974 Canadian federal election
Party	Candidate	Votes
Progressive Conservative	HAMILTON, Alvin	13,174
Liberal	BRECKENRIDGE, Gary	8,169
New Democratic	SIMMONDS, Wylie	5,799
Social Credit	EDDY, Walton	321
Independent	GARDINER, Wilf	316

1979 Canadian federal election
Party	Candidate	Votes
Progressive Conservative	HAMILTON, Alvin	16,023
New Democratic	HUBBARD, George A.	7,008
Liberal	BERRY, Leroy	6,737

1980 Canadian federal election
Party	Candidate	Votes
Progressive Conservative	HAMILTON, Alvin	13,676
New Democratic	MCCORRISTON, Mel W.R.	7,872
Liberal	LOWE, E.W. Jim	6,042

1984 Canadian federal election
Party	Candidate	Votes
Progressive Conservative	HAMILTON, Alvin	14,470
New Democratic	SAUTER, Bill	8,414
Liberal	BAUCHE, Mike	4,898
Confederation of Regions	MOSSING, Allan W. Al	655
Independent	BAILEY, Ray L.	602

== See also ==
- List of Canadian electoral districts
- Historical federal electoral districts of Canada
