= Assiniboia (federal electoral district) =

Former federal electoral district in Saskatchewan, Canada

Assiniboia was a federal electoral district in Saskatchewan, Canada, that was represented in the House of Commons of Canada from 1908 to 1988. This riding was created in 1907 following the admission of Saskatchewan into the Canadian Confederation in 1905.

The riding was located in the southeast corner of Saskatchewan until the 1949 election, when it was moved westward to be based around the community of Assiniboia. The riding's territory before and after the 1949 election did not overlap. Most of its pre-1949 territory was transferred to Moose Mountain with a small part being transferred to Qu'Appelle. Its new territory was carved out of parts of Wood Mountain and Weyburn.

It was abolished in 1987 when it was redistributed into Moose Jaw—Lake Centre, Regina—Qu'Appelle, Regina—Wascana, Souris—Moose Mountain and Swift Current—Maple Creek—Assiniboia ridings.

== Historical boundaries ==
1905 representation order

1914 representation order

1924 representation order

1933 representation order

1947 representation order

1952 representation order

1966 representation order

1976 representation order

== Election results ==
1908 Canadian federal election
Party	Candidate	Votes
Liberal	John Gillanders Turriff	4,048
Independent Conservative	Robert Lorne Richardson	3,542

1911 Canadian federal election
Party	Candidate	Votes
Liberal	John Gillanders Turriff	5,804
Conservative	Christopher "C". Smith	3,578

1917 Canadian federal election
Party	Candidate	Votes
Government (Unionist)	John Gillanders Turriff	6,836
Opposition (Laurier Liberals)	Edward Waddington	2,312

By-election on 27 October 1919 On Turiff being called to the Senate, 23 September 1918
Party	Candidate	Votes
United Farmers	Oliver Robert Gould	7,712
Independent Liberal	William Richard Motherwell	2,488

1921 Canadian federal election
Party	Candidate	Votes
Progressive	Oliver Robert Gould	6,549
Liberal	McLeod, Hugh	2,847
Conservative	William Wallace Lynd	2,225

1925 Canadian federal election
Party	Candidate	Votes
Liberal	Robert McKenzie	4,356
Progressive	Oliver Gould	3,124
Conservative	Joseph Hill	2,303

1926 Canadian federal election
Party	Candidate	Votes
Liberal	Robert McKenzie	6,066
Conservative	Joseph Hill	3,845
Progressive	Samuel Burchill	3,137

1930 Canadian federal election
Party	Candidate	Votes
Liberal	Robert McKenzie	8,226
Conservative	James Forbes Creighton	7,466

1935 Canadian federal election
Party	Candidate	Votes
Liberal	Robert McKenzie	6,213
Conservative	W. Wallace Lynd	3,847
Co-operative Commonwealth	Charles Gordon Broughton	3,293
Social Credit	John Harrison Hilton	1,557

By-election on 6 January 1936 On McKenzie's acceptance of an office of emolument under the Crown, 9 December 1935
Party	Candidate	Votes
Liberal	James Garfield Gardiner	7,282
Co-operative Commonwealth	William Irvine	3,717

1940 Canadian federal election
Party	Candidate	Votes
Liberal	Jesse Pickard Tripp	6,846
Co-operative Commonwealth	Samuel Norval Horner	4,812
National Government	James Lawrence Hart	3,516

1945 Canadian federal election
Party	Candidate	Votes
Co-operative Commonwealth	Edward George McCullough	6,952
Liberal	Jesse Pickard Tripp	5,779
Progressive Conservative	Joseph Hill	3,084

1949 Canadian federal election
Party	Candidate	Votes
Co-operative Commonwealth	Hazen Argue	8,442
Liberal	Raymond Alexander MacDonald	6,858
Progressive Conservative	George Jacob MacDonald	2,458
Social Credit	Arnold L. Meginbir	656

1953 Canadian federal election
Party	Candidate	Votes
Co-operative Commonwealth	Hazen Argue	10,596
Liberal	Elmer William Meek	7,218
Progressive Conservative	Frank Fletcher Hamilton	1,860
Social Credit	Arnold L. Meginbir	698

1957 Canadian federal election
Party	Candidate	Votes
Co-operative Commonwealth	Hazen Argue	10,389
Liberal	Ross Thatcher	8,862
Progressive Conservative	W.J. Ferguson	1,931
Social Credit	Anthony Batza	903

1958 Canadian federal election
Party	Candidate	Votes
Co-operative Commonwealth	Hazen Argue	9,104
Progressive Conservative	W.J. Ferguson	6,360
Liberal	Ross Thatcher	6,173

1962 Canadian federal election
Party	Candidate	Votes
Liberal	Hazen Argue	7,739
Progressive Conservative	Lawrence E. Watson	7,386
New Democratic	Cecil T. Bailey	5,153
Social Credit	Daryl D. Rumble	1,009

1963 Canadian federal election
Party	Candidate	Votes
Progressive Conservative	Lawrence E. Watson	9,393
Liberal	Hazen Argue	7,311
New Democratic	Cecil T. Bailey	3,683
Social Credit	Daryl David Rumble	575

1965 Canadian federal election
Party	Candidate	Votes
Progressive Conservative	Lawrence E. Watson	7,913
Liberal	Hazen Argue	7,294
New Democratic	John C. Wilson	4,934
Social Credit	Arnold L. Meginbir	303

1968 Canadian federal election
Party	Candidate	Votes
Liberal	Albert B. Douglas	9,636
Progressive Conservative	Lawrence E. Watson	9,541
New Democratic	Bruce L. Wilson	9,295

By-election on 8 November 1971 On Douglas' death, 6 March 1971
Party	Candidate	Votes
New Democratic	Bill Knight	9,956
Progressive Conservative	Lawrence E. Watson	8,172
Liberal	Jim Hooker	7,051

1972 Canadian federal election
Party	Candidate	Votes
New Democratic	Bill Knight	9,936
Progressive Conservative	Boyd Anderson	8,843
Liberal	Norm Flaten	7,799
Social Credit	Joseph A. Thauberger	839

1974 Canadian federal election
Party	Candidate	Votes
Liberal	Ralph Goodale	9,986
New Democratic	Bill Knight	9,441
Progressive Conservative	Tom Hart	7,105
Social Credit	Rod McRae	246

1979 Canadian federal election
Party	Candidate	Votes
Progressive Conservative	Lenard Gustafson	12,365
New Democratic	Bill Knight	11,183
Liberal	Ralph Goodale	9,955
Social Credit	Walton Eddy	292

1980 Canadian federal election
Party	Candidate	Votes
Progressive Conservative	Lenard Gustafson	11,251
Liberal	Ralph Goodale	10,167
New Democratic	Randy MacKenzie	9,710
Social Credit	Walton Eddy	178

1984 Canadian federal election
Party	Candidate	Votes
Progressive Conservative	Lenard Gustafson	16,026
New Democratic	Bill Adamack	10,853
Liberal	Lonny McKague	6,472
Confederation of Regions	Ted Coffey	595

== See also ==
- List of Canadian electoral districts
- Historical federal electoral districts of Canada
