= Bernie Collins =

Canadian politician (1935–2018)

Member of Parliament for Souris—Moose Mountain
- In office 1993–1997
- Preceded by: Lenard Gustafson
- Succeeded by: Roy Bailey

Personal details
- Born: Alphonsus Bernard Collins; 18 June 1935 Regina, Saskatchewan, Canada
- Died: 26 March 2018 (aged 82) Saskatoon, Saskatchewan, Canada
- Party: Liberal
- Occupation: educator, administrator

Alphonsus Bernard Collins (18 June 1935 – 26 March 2018) was a Canadian politician who was a member of the House of Commons of Canada for the Souris—Moose Mountain electoral district from 1993 to 1997. Born in Regina, Saskatchewan, his career was in education and public administration.

Collins was elected to Parliament as a Liberal party candidate in the 1993 federal election then served in the 35th Canadian Parliament. Collins left Canadian politics after losing the riding to Reform party candidate Roy Bailey in the 1997 election.

Collins died on 26 March 2018, at the age of 82.

== Electoral record ==
1997 Canadian federal election: Souris—Moose Mountain
Party	Candidate	Votes	%	±%	Expenditures
Reform	Roy Bailey	13,732	41.2	+10.5	$24,042
Liberal	Bernie Collins	9,077	27.2	-5.0	$42,840
New Democratic	Gary Lake	6,209	18.6	+2.1	$26,063
Progressive Conservative	Greg Douglas	4,333	13.0	-2.0	$11,530
Total valid votes		33,351	100.0		–
Total rejected ballots		128	0.4		
Turnout		33,479	67.0		

1993 Canadian federal election: Souris—Moose Mountain
Party	Candidate	Votes	%	±%
Liberal	Bernie Collins	10,829	32.2	+13.2
Reform	Doug Heimlick	10,330	30.7	–
New Democratic	Caroline Saxon	5,539	16.5	-16.0
Progressive Conservative	Earl Silcox	5,051	15.0	-31.8
Independent	Art Mainil	918	2.7	–
Independent	David Davis	701	2.1	–
Canada Party	David Bouchard	271	0.8	–
Total valid votes		33,639	100.0	
