= John Frederick Herman =

Canadian politician

John Frederick Herman (April 11, 1889 – February 1950) was a farmer and political figure in Saskatchewan. He represented Melville from 1938 to 1944 in the Legislative Assembly of Saskatchewan as a Social Credit member.

He was born in Bradford, Ontario, the son of Frederick William Herman and Sarah Etta Roach, and was educated in Severn Bridge, Ontario, in Moosomin, Saskatchewan and in Regina. Herman taught school in Saskatchewan for several years. In 1922, he married Eva Chilcott. He was an unsuccessful Farmer-Labour candidate for the Moosomin seat in the provincial assembly in 1934 and for the Qu'Appelle seat in the Canadian House of Commons running as a CCF candidate the following year. Herman lived in Rocanville. He did not run for reelection to the provincial assembly in 1944.

== Electoral record ==
1934 Saskatchewan general election: Moosomin electoral district
Party	Candidate	Votes	%	±%
Liberal	Arthur T. Procter	2,812	44.62%	-
Conservative	Frederick Dennis Munroe	2,465	39.11%	-
Farmer-Labour	John Frederick Herman	1,025	16.27%	–
Total		6,302	100.00%	

1935 Canadian federal election: Qu'Appelle
Party	Candidate	Votes	%	±%
Conservative	Ernest Perley	5,769	36.6	
Liberal	James Alexander McCowan	5,579	35.4	-17.9
Co-operative Commonwealth	John Frederick Herman	2,210	14.0	
Social Credit	Joseph Alois Thauberger	2,186	13.9	
Total valid votes		15,744	100.0	

1938 Saskatchewan general election: Melville
Party	Candidate	Votes	%	±%
Social Credit	John Frederick Herman	5,100	50.05%	–
Liberal	Charles Morton Dunn	5,089	49.95%	-
Total		10,189	100.00%	
