= James Balfour (Canadian politician) =

Canadian politician

R. James Balfour (22 May 1928 – 12 December 1999) was first elected in the 1972 federal election as a Progressive Conservative Member of Parliament for Regina East, Saskatchewan. He also served in the Senate of Canada from 13 September 1979 until his death.

He was born in Regina, Saskatchewan. Balfour was educated at Luther College in Regina and at the University of Saskatchewan. He was called to the Saskatchewan bar in 1952. Balfour was named a Queen's Counsel in 1969.

He was the grandson of James Balfour, a former mayor of Regina.

Parliament of Canada
Preceded by John Burton	Member of Parliament for Regina East; 1972–1979	Succeeded by Simon De Jong
