= Regina East =

Former federal electoral district in Saskatchewan, Canada

Regina East was a federal electoral district in Saskatchewan, Canada, that was represented in the House of Commons of Canada from 1968 to 1988. This riding was created in 1966 from parts of Humboldt—Melfort, Melville, Moose Jaw—Lake Centre, QuAppelle, Regina City and Yorkton ridings.

It was abolished in 1987 when it was redistributed into Regina—Qu'Appelle and Regina—Wascana ridings.

== Election results ==
1968 Canadian federal election
Party	Candidate	Votes
New Democratic	BURTON, John	13,641
Progressive Conservative	HAMILTON, Alvin	13,449
Liberal	MACLEOD, Ken	11,986
Communist	BEECHING, William Charles	230

1972 Canadian federal election
Party	Candidate	Votes
Progressive Conservative	BALFOUR, Jim	17,781
New Democratic	BURTON, John	15,175
Liberal	THATCHER, Peggie	7,892
Social Credit	FAHLMAN, Emanuel	774
Not affiliated	BEECHING, W.C.	148
Not affiliated	CONWAY, Jeff	83

1974 Canadian federal election
Party	Candidate	Votes
Progressive Conservative	BALFOUR, Jim	15,030
New Democratic	BURTON, John	12,651
Liberal	THAUBERGER, John	12,538
Social Credit	FAHLMAN, Emanuel	301
Communist	BEECHING, W.C.	155
Marxist–Leninist	CONWAY, Jeff	84

1979 Canadian federal election
Party	Candidate	Votes
New Democratic	DE JONG, Simon	15,022
Progressive Conservative	LEIER, Terry	12,972
Liberal	MERCHANT, Tony	12,645
Social Credit	FAHLMAN, Emanuel	344
Communist	MASSIE, Gordon	65
Marxist–Leninist	BEAL, George	51

1980 Canadian federal election
Party	Candidate	Votes
New Democratic	DE JONG, Simon	13,630
Progressive Conservative	KEPLE, Brian	12,602
Liberal	MERCHANT, Tony	10,302
Rhinoceros	HOOVER, Derron H.X.	302
Not affiliated	WHITE, Jerry	74
Marxist–Leninist	BEAL, Carl George	61
Communist	MASSIE, Gordon	39

1984 Canadian federal election
Party	Candidate	Votes
New Democratic	DE JONG, Simon	20,474
Progressive Conservative	KEPLE, Brian	15,185
Liberal	BOUCHARD, Dave	9,554
Confederation of Regions	FAHLMAN, Emanuel	408

== See also ==
- List of Canadian electoral districts
- Historical federal electoral districts of Canada
