= Robert Kitchen =

Canadian politician

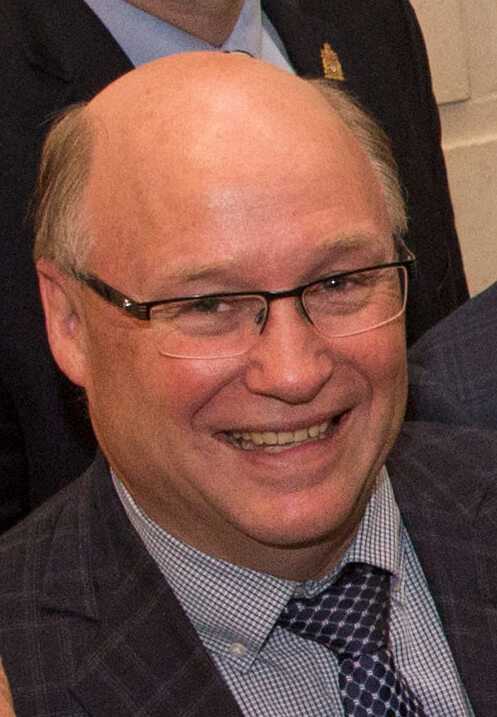

Member of Parliament for Souris—Moose Mountain
- In office October 19, 2015 – March 23, 2025
- Preceded by: Ed Komarnicki
- Succeeded by: Steven Bonk

Personal details
- Born: 1957 or 1958 (age 67–68) Poole, Dorset, England
- Party: Conservative
- Spouse: Donna Kitchen
- Children: 3
- Profession: Chiropractor

Robert Gordon Kitchen (born 1957) is a Canadian politician and chiropractor. A member of the Conservative Party, he was a member of Parliament (MP) in the House of Commons representing Souris—Moose Mountain from 2015 to 2025.

== Biography ==
Kitchen was born in England, while his father, a major general in the Canadian Armed Forces, was stationed there. When he was sixteen years old, he was hit by a drunk driver while riding a bicycle. As a result, he is deaf in his left ear. He lived in Canada, England, Pakistan, Afghanistan, Iran, and the United States as a child. He attended the University of Waterloo, graduating with a B.Sc. (Hons.) degree in Kinesiology, before attending the Canadian Memorial Chiropractic College where he earned his Doctor of Chiropractic (D.C). Kitchen later completed a two-year specialty fellowship in chiropractic clinical sciences, including a six-month residency at the Royal University Hospital Department of Orthopedics in Saskatoon as well as a postgraduate degree in educational administration at the University of Regina.

Kitchen owned and operated a private chiropractic clinic for the past 26 years in Estevan and is a board member of the Chiropractors' Association of Saskatchewan (CAS); a registrar for the CAS for six years; and president of the Canadian Federation of Chiropractic Regulatory, Educational and Accreditation Board (CRCREAB) for four years.

In 2015, Kitchen was elected Member of Parliament for Souris—Moose Mountain. He was re-elected twice in 2019 and 2021. In July 2024, Kitchen announced that he would not seek reelection in 2025.

== Electoral record ==
2021 Canadian federal election: Souris—Moose Mountain
Party	Candidate	Votes	%	±%	Expenditures
Conservative	Robert Kitchen	30,049	76.4	-8	$42,572.46
People's	Diane Neufeld	3,571	9.1	+7.4	$2,854.44
New Democratic	Hannah Ann Duerr	3,107	7.9	+0.16	$0.00
Liberal	Javin Ames-Sinclair	1,636	4.2	+0.07	$2,023.58
Maverick	Greg Douglas	977	2.5	–	$3,190.12
Total valid votes/expense limit		39,340	100.0	–	$119,102.72
Total rejected ballots		285			
Turnout		39,625	76.96		
Eligible voters		51,485			
Source: Elections Canada

2019 Canadian federal election: Souris—Moose Mountain
Party	Candidate	Votes	%	±%	Expenditures
Conservative	Robert Kitchen	35,067	84.40	+14.26	$39,724.57
New Democratic	Ashlee Hicks	3,214	7.74	-5.94	$889.04
Liberal	Javin Ames-Sinclair	1,718	4.13	-9.4	$1,657.78
People's	Phillip Zajac	702	1.69		none listed
Green	Judy Mergel	681	1.64	-1.01	$294.15
Canadian Nationalist	Travis Patron	168	0.40		$10,118.21
Total valid votes/expense limit		41,550	100.0		
Total rejected ballots		114			
Turnout		41,664	80.19		
Eligible voters		51,957			
Conservative hold		Swing		+10.10	
Source: Elections Canada

2015 Canadian federal election: Souris—Moose Mountain
Party	Candidate	Votes	%	±%	Expenditures
Conservative	Robert Kitchen	26,315	70.14	-2.72	$40,077.78
New Democratic	Vicky O'Dell	5,131	13.68	-4.81	$28,983.38
Liberal	Steve Bebbington	5,076	13.53	+7.94	$159.00
Green	Bob Deptuck	994	2.65	-0.48	$0.11
Total valid votes/expense limit		37,516	100.0		$228,560.45
Total rejected ballots		126	–	–	
Turnout		37,642	72.25	+8.25	
Eligible voters		52,093			
Conservative hold		Swing		-3.78	
Source: Elections Canada
