= Lenard Gustafson =

Canadian politician (1933–2022)

The Honourable Lenard Gustafson PC

Canadian Senator from Saskatchewan
- In office May 26, 1993 – November 10, 2008
- Nominated by: Brian Mulroney
- Appointed by: Ray Hnatyshyn

Member of Parliament for Souris—Moose Mountain (Assiniboia; 1979–1988)
- In office May 22, 1979 – May 25, 1993
- Preceded by: Ralph Goodale
- Succeeded by: Bernie Collins

Personal details
- Born: Lenard Joseph Gustafson; November 10, 1933 Macoun, Saskatchewan, Canada
- Died: March 18, 2022 (aged 88) Midale, Saskatchewan, Canada
- Party: Progressive Conservative; Conservative
- Occupation: Politician; farmer; contractor; businessman

Lenard Joseph Gustafson, PC (November 10, 1933 – March 18, 2022) was a Canadian politician from Saskatchewan. Gustafson served in the Senate of Canada and House of Commons of Canada.

== Background ==
Born in Macoun, Saskatchewan, Gustafson was a farmer, contractor and businessman, before he was elected to the House of Commons of Canada in the 1979 general election as the Progressive Conservative Member of Parliament for Assiniboia, Saskatchewan. He did not serve in the short-lived government led by Prime Minister Joe Clark.

He was re-elected in 1980, 1984, and 1988. Gustafson served as parliamentary secretary to Prime Minister Brian Mulroney from 1984 until shortly before Mulroney left office. In May 1993, shortly before his retirement, Mulroney appointed Gustafson to the Senate of Canada, where he sat as a Progressive Conservative and, since February 2004, as a Conservative. He retired from the Senate upon reaching the mandatory retirement age of 75 on November 10, 2008. On January 8, 2009, it was announced that Gustafson was appointed to the Privy Council on the advice of Prime Minister Stephen Harper.

Gustafson died on March 18, 2022, in Midale, Saskatchewan.

== Electoral record ==
1988 Canadian federal election: Souris—Moose Mountain
| Party | Candidate | Votes | % |
|---|---|---|---|
| Progressive Conservative | Lenard Gustafson | 17,200 | 46.8 |
| New Democratic | Jeff Sample | 11,924 | 32.5 |
| Liberal | Mike Bauche | 6,965 | 19.0 |
| Confederation of Regions | Kelvin G. Rutten | 652 | 1.8 |
| Total valid votes | | 36,741 | 100.0 |

Parliament of Canada
| Preceded by Ralph Goodale | Member of Parliament for Assiniboia; 1979–1988 | Succeeded by The electoral district was abolished in 1987. |
| Preceded by The electoral district was created in 1987. | Member of Parliament for Souris—Moose Mountain; 1988–1993 | Succeeded by Bernie Collins |
