= Oliver Robert Gould =

Canadian politician

Oliver Robert Gould (April 4, 1874 – October 7, 1951) was a farmer and political figure in Saskatchewan, Canada. He represented Assiniboia in the House of Commons of Canada from 1919 to 1925 as a United Farmers and then Progressive Party member.

He was born in Pontypridd, Wales, the son of John Gould and Mary Ann Pike, and came to Forest, Ontario with his family in 1881, moving to Oak Lake, Manitoba in the early 1890s. Gould settled on a farm near Manor, Saskatchewan, where he also worked as a carpenter. He served five years on the town council for Manor. Gould was first elected to the House of Commons as a United Farmers MP in a 1919 by-election held after John Gillanders Turriff was named to the Senate. He was re-elected as a Progressive MP in the 1921 general election but defeated when he ran for re-election in 1925 federal election. He was married three times; first to Sarah Elizabeth Hindmarch, then to Daisy Fern Malin and finally to Hazel Maxwell Reid.
