= Regina—Qu'Appelle =

Federal electoral district in Saskatchewan, Canada

Saskatchewan electoral district
- Interactive map of riding boundaries from the 2025 federal election

Federal electoral district
- Legislature: House of Commons
MP
Andrew Scheer
Conservative
- District created: 1987
- First contested: 1988
- Last contested: 2025
- District webpage: profile, map

Demographics
- Population (2011): 72,891
- Electors (2019): 55,280
- Area (km²): 13,430
- Pop. density (per km²): 5.4
- Census subdivision(s): Regina (part), Edenwold (part), White City, Pilot Butte, Fort Qu'Appelle, Lumsden (part), Indian Head, Balgonie, Wynyard, South Qu'Appelle

Regina—Qu'Appelle (formerly Qu'Appelle) is a federal electoral district in Saskatchewan, Canada, that has been represented in the House of Commons of Canada from 1904 to 1968 and since 1988.

== Geography ==
The district includes the northeastern quarter of the city of Regina and the surrounding eastern rural area including the towns of Balgonie, Fort Qu'Appelle, Balcarres, Indian Head, Qu'Appelle, Pilot Butte, and White City; extending northwards to the towns of Southey, Cupar, Raymore, and Punnichy.

== History ==
The Qu'Appelle riding was first created in 1903 and covered the North-West Territories, including what would later be Saskatchewan. In 1905, the district was amended to just cover Saskatchewan.

In 1966, Qu'Appelle riding was abolished when it was redistributed between the Qu'Appelle—Moose Mountain, Regina—Lake Centre, Regina East and Assiniboia ridings.

In 1987, Regina—Qu'Appelle was created from parts of the Assiniboia, Humboldt—Lake Centre, Qu'Appelle–Moose Mountain and Regina East ridings.

The riding was known as Qu'Appelle from 1996 to 1998. In 1998, its name was changed back to Regina—Qu'Appelle.

This riding gained fractions of territory from Palliser, Regina—Lumsden—Lake Centre and Blackstrap during the 2012 electoral redistribution. It became the only hybrid urban-rural riding in the Regina area after the 2012 redistribution.

== Demographics ==
Panethnic groups in Regina—Qu'Appelle (2011−2021)
Panethnic group	2021		2016		2011	
Panethnic group	Pop.	%	Pop.	%	Pop.	%
European (Note: Statistic includes all persons that did not make up part of a visible minority or an indigenous identity.)	50,140	65.56%	51,485	68.79%	52,120	72.5%
Indigenous	16,045	20.98%	15,700	20.98%	15,575	21.67%
Southeast Asian (Note: Statistic includes total responses of "Filipino" and "Southeast Asian" under visible minority section on census.)	4,100	5.36%	2,960	3.95%	1,355	1.88%
South Asian	2,695	3.52%	1,945	2.6%	830	1.15%
African	1,885	2.46%	1,565	2.09%	745	1.04%
East Asian (Note: Statistic includes total responses of "Chinese", "Korean", and "Japanese" under visible minority section on census.)	510	0.67%	515	0.69%	705	0.98%
Middle Eastern (Note: Statistic includes total responses of "West Asian" and "Arab" under visible minority section on census.)	510	0.67%	320	0.43%	125	0.17%
Latin American	270	0.35%	175	0.23%	300	0.42%
Other/multiracial (Note: Statistic includes total responses of "Visible minority, n.i.e." and "Multiple visible minorities" under visible minority section on census.)	330	0.43%	190	0.25%	135	0.19%
Total responses	76,485	97.88%	74,845	98.46%	71,885	98.62%
Total population	78,140	100%	76,017	100%	72,891	100%
Notes: Totals greater than 100% due to multiple origin responses. Demographics based on 2012 Canadian federal electoral redistribution riding boundaries.

According to the 2011 Canadian census; 2013 representation

Languages: 91.0% English, 1.3% Ukrainian, 1.2% German, 1.0% French
Religions: 67.2% Christian (28.8% Catholic, 11.9% United Church, 7.9% Lutheran, 4.0% Anglican, 1.3% Baptist, 1.3% Pentecostal, 12.0% Other), 3.6% Traditional Aboriginal Spirituality, 1.1% Muslim, 26.9% No religion
Median income (2010): $29,627
Average income (2010): $37,401

== Members of Parliament ==
The riding has elected the following members of the House of Commons:

Parliament	Years	Member	Party
Qu'Appelle
10th	1904–1908	Richard Stuart Lake	Conservative
11th	1908–1911	Richard Stuart Lake	Conservative
12th	1911–1917	Levi Thomson	Liberal
13th	1917–1921	Levi Thomson	Government (Unionist)
14th	1921–1925	John Millar	Progressive
15th	1925–1926	John Millar	Progressive
16th	1926–1930	John Millar	Liberal–Progressive
17th	1930–1935	Ernest Perley	Liberal
18th	1935–1940	Ernest Perley	Conservative
19th	1940–1945	Ernest Perley	National Government
20th	1945–1949	Gladys Strum	Co-operative Commonwealth
21st	1949–1953	Austin Edwin Dewar	Liberal
22nd	1953–1957	Henry Mang	Liberal
23rd	1957–1958	Alvin Hamilton	Progressive Conservative
24th	1958–1962	Alvin Hamilton	Progressive Conservative
25th	1962–1963	Alvin Hamilton	Progressive Conservative
26th	1963–1965	Alvin Hamilton	Progressive Conservative
27th	1965–1968	Alvin Hamilton	Progressive Conservative
Riding dissolved into Qu'Appelle—Moose Mountain, Regina—Lake Centre, Regina East and Assiniboia
Regina—Qu'Appelle; Riding created from Assiniboia, Humboldt—Lake Centre, Qu'Appelle—Moose Mountain and Regina East
34th	1988–1993	Simon De Jong	New Democratic
35th	1993–1997	Simon De Jong	New Democratic
Qu'Appelle
36th	1997–2000	Lorne Nystrom	New Democratic
Regina—Qu'Appelle
37th	2000–2004	Lorne Nystrom	New Democratic
38th	2004–2006	Andrew Scheer	Conservative
39th	2006–2008	Andrew Scheer	Conservative
40th	2008–2011	Andrew Scheer	Conservative
41st	2011–2015	Andrew Scheer	Conservative
42nd	2015–2019	Andrew Scheer	Conservative
43rd	2019–2021	Andrew Scheer	Conservative
44th	2021–2025	Andrew Scheer	Conservative
45th	2025–present	Andrew Scheer	Conservative

== Election results ==
Graph of election results in Regina—Qu'Apelle (since 1988, minor parties that never got 2% of the vote or didn't run consistently are omitted)

=== Regina—Qu'Appelle ===
2025 Canadian federal election
Party	Candidate	Votes	%	±%	Expenditures
Conservative	Andrew Scheer	27,024	64.0	+2.1	
Liberal	Rahima Mian	11,391	27.0	+16.9	
New Democratic	Chris Simmie	3,388	8.0	-12.9	
People's	Dionne Fehler	441	1.0	-4.1	
Total valid votes/expense limit		42,244	99.2		
Total rejected ballots		324	0.8		
Turnout		42,568	65.8		
Eligible voters		64,777			
Conservative hold		Swing		+2.1	
Source: Elections Canada

2021 federal election redistributed results
Party	Vote	%
Conservative	23,021	60.28
New Democratic	8,658	22.67
Liberal	3,908	10.23
People's	1,883	4.93
Green	723	1.89

2021 Canadian federal election
Party	Candidate	Votes	%	±%	Expenditures
Conservative	Andrew Scheer	20,400	61.9	-1.2	$91,531.28
New Democratic	Annaliese Bos	6,879	20.9	+1.1	$2,979.46
Liberal	Cecilia Melanson	3,344	10.1	-1.6	$2,031.08
People's	Andrew Yubeta	1,668	5.1	+3.8	$4,045.00
Green	Naomi Hunter	668	2.0	-1.3	$9,007.92
Total valid votes/expense limit		32,959	99.2	–	$106,873.27
Total rejected ballots		254	0.8		
Turnout		33,213	60.0		
Eligible voters		55,401			
Conservative hold		Swing		-1.2	
Source: Elections Canada

2019 Canadian federal election
Party	Candidate	Votes	%	±%	Expenditures
Conservative	Andrew Scheer	24,463	63.12	+18.42	$51,267.61
New Democratic	Ray Aldinger	7,685	19.83	-10.38	$2,559.68
Liberal	Jordan Ames-Sinclair	4,543	11.72	-11.06	$8,859.46
Green	Dale Dewar	1,282	3.31	+1.00	$4,459.24
People's	Tracey Sparrowhawk	513	1.32	–	none listed
Libertarian	James Plummer	116	0.30	–	$3.05
Independent	Kieran Szuchewycz	78	0.20	–	$0.00
Rhinoceros	Éric Normand	75	0.19	–	none listed
Total valid votes/expense limit		38,755	99.17	–	$103,664.70
Total rejected ballots		323	0.83	+0.41	
Turnout		38,078	69.27	+0.99	
Eligible voters		56,412			
Conservative hold		Swing		+14.40	
Source: Elections Canada

2015 Canadian federal election
Party	Candidate	Votes	%	±%	Expenditures
Conservative	Andrew Scheer	16,486	44.70	-8.49	$118,170.22
New Democratic	Nial Kuyek	11,144	30.21	-8.44	$65,386.08
Liberal	Della Anaquod	8,401	22.78	+18.02	$21,967.01
Green	Greg Chatterson	852	2.31	-0.67	$3,114.91
Total valid votes/expense limit		36,883	99.59		$202,239.34
Total rejected ballots		152	0.41	–	
Turnout		37,035	68.28	–	
Eligible voters		54,240			
Conservative hold		Swing		-0.03	
Source: Elections Canada

2011 federal election redistributed results
Party	Vote	%
Conservative	16,197	53.19
New Democratic	11,769	38.65
Liberal	1,449	4.76
Green	908	2.98
Others	127	0.42

2011 Canadian federal election
Party	Candidate	Votes	%	±%	Expenditures
Conservative	Andrew Scheer	15,896	53.5	+1.8	$78,726
New Democratic	Fred Clipsham	11,419	38.4	+6.3	$63,800
Liberal	Jackie Miller	1,400	4.7	-5.8	$15,991
Green	Greg Chatterson	879	3.0	-2.8	$9,100
Independent	Jeff Breti	127	0.4	–	$18,116
Total valid votes/expense limit		29,721	100.0		$81,793
Total rejected ballots		97	0.3	0.0	
Turnout		29,818	61.7	+4	
Eligible voters		48,300	–	–	
Conservative hold		Swing		-2.25	

2008 Canadian federal election
Party	Candidate	Votes	%	±%	Expenditures
Conservative	Andrew Scheer	14,068	51.7	+10.4	$78,480
New Democratic	Janice Bernier	8,699	32.1	-0.3	$44,446
Liberal	Rod Flaman	2,809	10.5	-12.7	$17,222
Green	Greg Chatterson	1,556	5.8	+2.5	$8,194
Total valid votes/expense limit		27,135	100.0		$78,949
Total rejected ballots		81	0.3	0.0	
Turnout		27,213	57	-7	
Conservative hold		Swing		+5.35	

2006 Canadian federal election
Party	Candidate	Votes	%	±%	Expenditures
Conservative	Andrew Scheer	12,753	41.3	+5.5	$71,773
New Democratic	Lorne Nystrom	10,041	32.4	-0.3	$50,501
Liberal	Allyce Herle	7,134	23.1	-4.7	$68,287
Green	Brett Dolter	1,016	3.3	+1.0	$545
Total valid votes		30,944	100.0		–
Total rejected ballots		93	0.3	0.0	
Turnout		31,037	64	+8	
Conservative hold		Swing		+2.90	

2004 Canadian federal election
Party	Candidate	Votes	%	±%	Expenditures
Conservative	Andrew Scheer	10,012	35.8	-5.0	$68,776
New Democratic	Lorne Nystrom	9,151	32.7	-8.6	$46,290
Liberal	Allyce Herle	7,793	27.8	+9.9	$54,913
Green	Deanna Robilliard	639	2.3	–	
Christian Heritage	Mary Sylvia Nelson	293	1.0	–	$4,213
Independent	Lorne Edward Widger	106	0.4	–	$728
Total valid votes		27,994	100.0		–
Total rejected ballots		89	0.3	-0.2	
Turnout		28,083	56.2	-4.9	
Conservative gain from New Democratic		Swing		+1.80	

Note: Conservative vote is compared to the Canadian Alliance vote in 2000 election.

2000 Canadian federal election
Party	Candidate	Votes	%	±%	Expenditures
New Democratic	Lorne Nystrom	11,731	41.3	-1.1	$57,492
Alliance	Don Leier	11,567	40.7	+13.8	$34,106
Liberal	Melvin Isnana	5,106	18.0	-5.8	$41,445
Total valid votes		28,404	100.0		–
Total rejected ballots		141	0.5	-0.1	
Turnout		28,545	61.1	-1.7	
New Democratic hold		Swing		-7.45	

Note: Canadian Alliance vote is compared to the Reform vote in 1997 election.

=== Qu'Appelle, 1988–2000 ===
1997 Canadian federal election
Party	Candidate	Votes	%	±%	Expenditures
New Democratic	Lorne Nystrom	12,269	42.4	+7.9	$59,376
Reform	Les Winter	7,784	26.9	+4.4	$55,562
Liberal	Don Ross	6,868	23.7	-7.4	$37,643
Progressive Conservative	Roy Gaebel	1,633	5.6	-4.4	$13,911
Canadian Action	Greg Chatterson	382	1.3	–	
Total valid votes		28,936	100.0		–
Total rejected ballots		143	0.6	+0.1	
Turnout		29,079	62.8		

1993 Canadian federal election
Party	Candidate	Votes	%	±%
New Democratic	Simon De Jong	11,178	34.5	-19.4
Liberal	Reina Sinclair	10,071	31.1	+16.5
Reform	Kerry Gray	7,286	22.5	
Progressive Conservative	Tom Hull	3,262	10.1	-21.4
National	Jenny Watson	392	1.2	
Canada Party	Joseph Thauberger	178	0.5	
Total valid votes		32,367	100.0	

1988 Canadian federal election
Party	Candidate	Votes	%
New Democratic	Simon De Jong	18,608	54.0
Progressive Conservative	William Lawrence Hicke	10,854	31.5
Liberal	Larry Smith	5,028	14.6
Total valid votes		34,490	100.0

=== Qu'Appelle, 1904–1968 ===
Graph of election results in Qu'Apelle (minor parties that never got 2% of the vote or didn't run consistently are omitted)

1965 Canadian federal election
Party	Candidate	Votes	%	±%
Progressive Conservative	Alvin Hamilton	9,579	57.5	-2.6
Liberal	Charlie Lenz	4,033	24.2	-0.1
New Democratic	Clif Argue	2,658	16.0	+4.5
Social Credit	Wilfred Totten	375	2.3	-1.9
Total valid votes		16,645	100.0	

1963 Canadian federal election
Party	Candidate	Votes	%	±%
Progressive Conservative	Alvin Hamilton	10,690	60.2	+1.7
Liberal	L.L. Prefontaine	4,312	24.3	+0.8
New Democratic	Norman Kennedy	2,028	11.4	-0.6
Social Credit	Edwin Fredlund	729	4.1	-2.0
Total valid votes		17,759	100.0	

1962 Canadian federal election
Party	Candidate	Votes	%	±%
Progressive Conservative	Alvin Hamilton	10,680	58.5	-0.6
Liberal	L.L. Prefontaine	4,291	23.5	-1.0
New Democratic	Harry E. Richardson	2,188	12.0	-4.5
Social Credit	Herman A. Hauser	1,113	6.1	
Total valid votes		18,272	100.0	

Note: NDP vote is compared to CCF vote in 1958 election.

1958 Canadian federal election
Party	Candidate	Votes	%	±%
Progressive Conservative	Alvin Hamilton	10,514	59.0	+24.8
Liberal	Thomas Kearns	4,357	24.5	-5.9
Co-operative Commonwealth	Norman Kennedy	2,941	16.5	-7.1
Total valid votes		17,812	100.0	

1957 Canadian federal election
Party	Candidate	Votes	%	±%
Progressive Conservative	Alvin Hamilton	6,217	34.2	+7.1
Liberal	Henry Philip Mang	5,512	30.4	-8.1
Co-operative Commonwealth	Norman Kennedy	4,279	23.6	-7.3
Social Credit	David Isman	2,150	11.8	+8.3
Total valid votes		18,158	100.0	

1953 Canadian federal election
Party	Candidate	Votes	%	±%
Liberal	Henry Philip Mang	6,988	38.5	-6.3
Co-operative Commonwealth	Lawrence Irwin Hockley	5,612	30.9	-7.0
Progressive Conservative	Alvin Hamilton	4,930	27.1	+9.7
Social Credit	Anton Edward Kovatch	644	3.5	
Total valid votes		18,174	100.0	

1949 Canadian federal election
Party	Candidate	Votes	%	±%
Liberal	Austin Edwin Dewar	9,017	44.7	+15.1
Co-operative Commonwealth	Gladys Strum	7,629	37.8	+0.4
Progressive Conservative	Rhys Graham Williams	3,519	17.5	-15.5
Total valid votes		20,165	100.0	

1945 Canadian federal election
Party	Candidate	Votes	%	±%
Co-operative Commonwealth	Gladys Strum	6,146	37.4	
Progressive Conservative	Ernest Perley	5,415	33.0	-21.9
Liberal	Gen. Andrew George Latta McNaughton	4,871	29.6	-15.5
Total valid votes		16,432	100.0	

Note: Progressive Conservative vote is compared to "National Government" vote in 1940 election. Social Credit vote is compared to New Democracy vote in 1940 election.

1940 Canadian federal election
Party	Candidate	Votes	%	±%
National Government	Ernest Perley	8,236	54.9	+18.2
Liberal	James Alexander McCowan	6,775	45.1	+9.7
Total valid votes		15,011	100.0	

Note: "National Government" vote is compared to Conservative vote in 1935 election.

1935 Canadian federal election
Party	Candidate	Votes	%	±%
Conservative	Ernest Perley	5,769	36.6	
Liberal	James Alexander McCowan	5,579	35.4	-17.9
Co-operative Commonwealth	John Frederick Herman	2,210	14.0	
Social Credit	Joseph Alois Thauberger	2,186	13.9	
Total valid votes		15,744	100.0	

1930 Canadian federal election
Party	Candidate	Votes	%	±%
Liberal	Ernest Perley	7,888	53.3	
Liberal–Progressive	John Millar	6,905	46.7	-10.2
Total valid votes		14,793	100.0	

1926 Canadian federal election
Party	Candidate	Votes	%	±%
Liberal–Progressive	John Millar	7,778	56.9	+3.5
Conservative	William Wallace Lynd	5,891	43.1	-3.5
Total valid votes		13,669	100.0	

Note: Liberal-Progressive vote is compared to Progressive vote in 1925 election.

1925 Canadian federal election
Party	Candidate	Votes	%
Progressive	John Millar	5,272	53.4
Conservative	William Wallace Lynd	4,600	46.6
Total valid votes		9,872	100.0

1921 Canadian federal election
Party	Candidate	Votes	%
Progressive	John Millar	8,350	69.3
Conservative	Ernest Perley	3,705	30.7
Total valid votes		12,055	100.0

1917 Canadian federal election
Party	Candidate	Votes
Government (Unionist)	Levi Thomson	acclaimed

1911 Canadian federal election
Party	Candidate	Votes	%	±%
Liberal	Levi Thomson	4,298	52.6	+2.9
Conservative	Richard Stuart Lake	3,874	47.4	-2.9
Total valid votes		8,172	100.0	

1908 Canadian federal election
Party	Candidate	Votes	%
Conservative	Richard Stuart Lake	3,833	50.3
Liberal	J.T. Brown	3,781	49.7
Total valid votes		7,614	100.0

== See also ==
- List of Canadian electoral districts
- Historical federal electoral districts of Canada

Parliament of Canada
Preceded by Sturgeon River—Parkland	Constituency represented by the leader of the Opposition; 2017–2020	Succeeded by Durham
Preceded by Carleton	Constituency represented by the leader of the Opposition; May–August 2025	Succeeded by Battle River—Crowfoot
