= Canadian Nationalist Party (2017) =

White nationalist political party (2017–2022)

Canadian Nationalist Party Parti Nationaliste Canadien
- Former federal political party
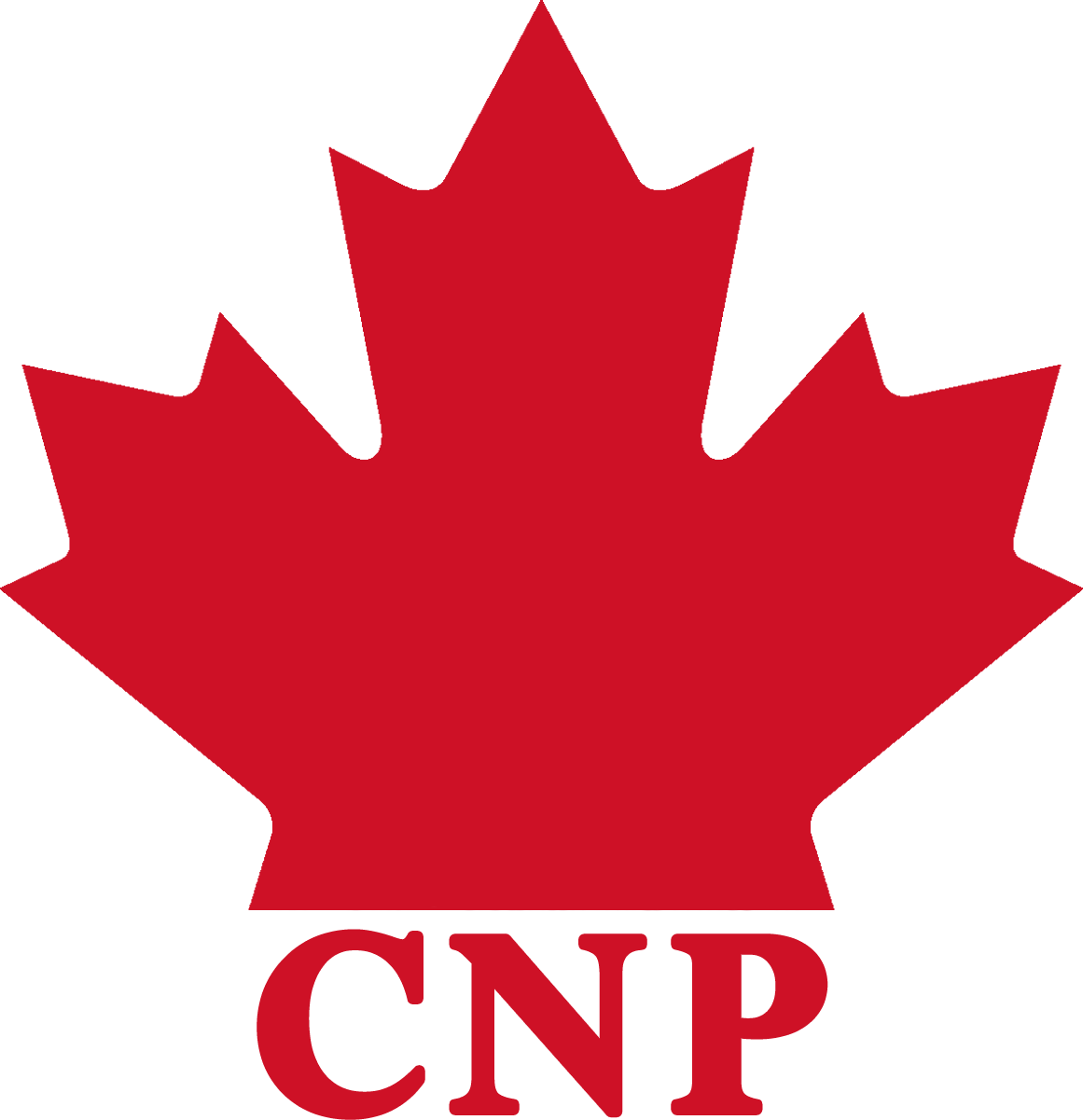
- Abbreviation: CNP (English); PNC (French)
- Founder: Travis Patron
- Founded: June 1, 2017
- Dissolved: March 31, 2022
- Headquarters: Scarborough, Ontario
- Newspaper: The Red Ensign
- Ideology: White nationalism; Right-wing populism
- Political position: Far-right
- Religion: Christianity
- Colours: Ensign red White

Party flag
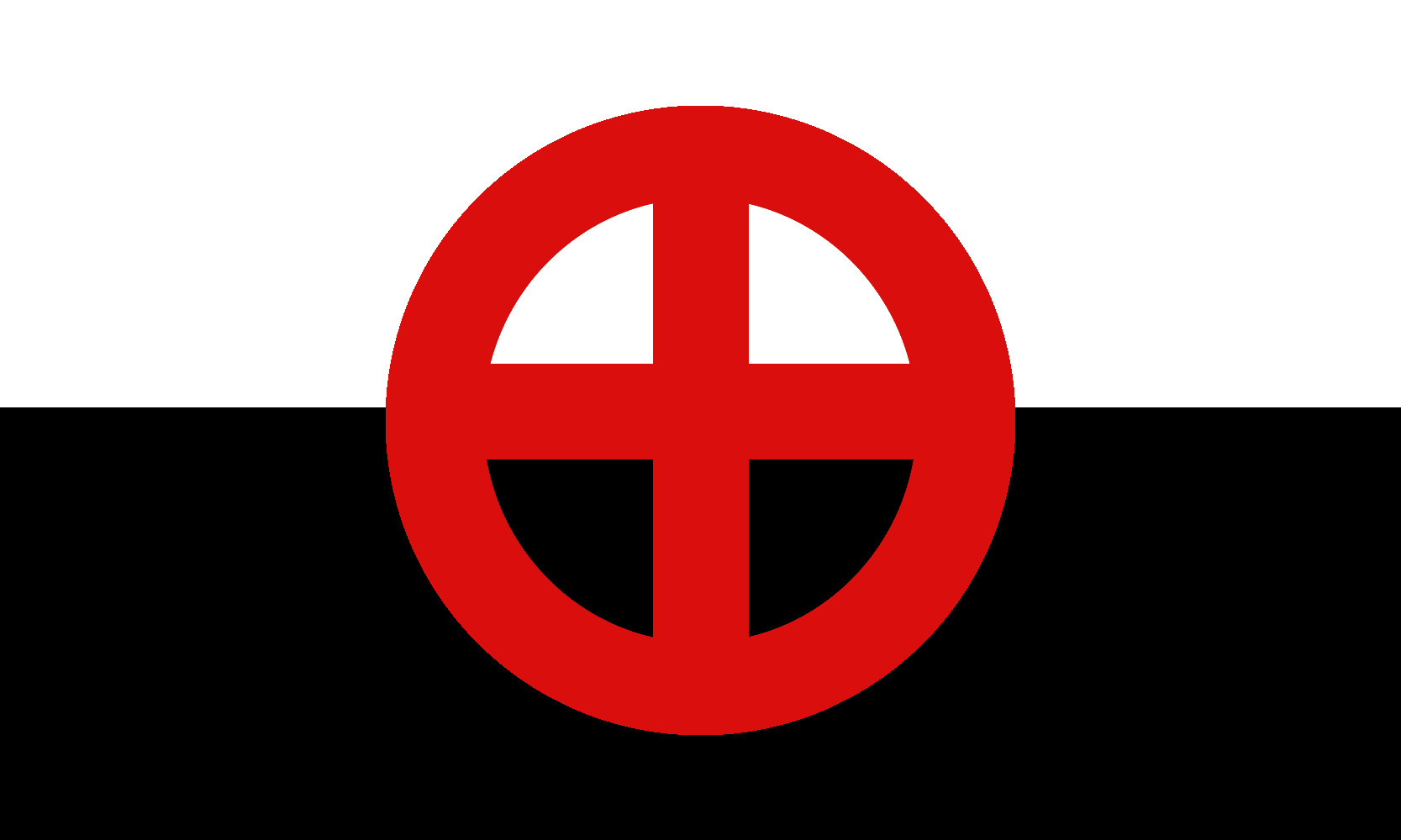
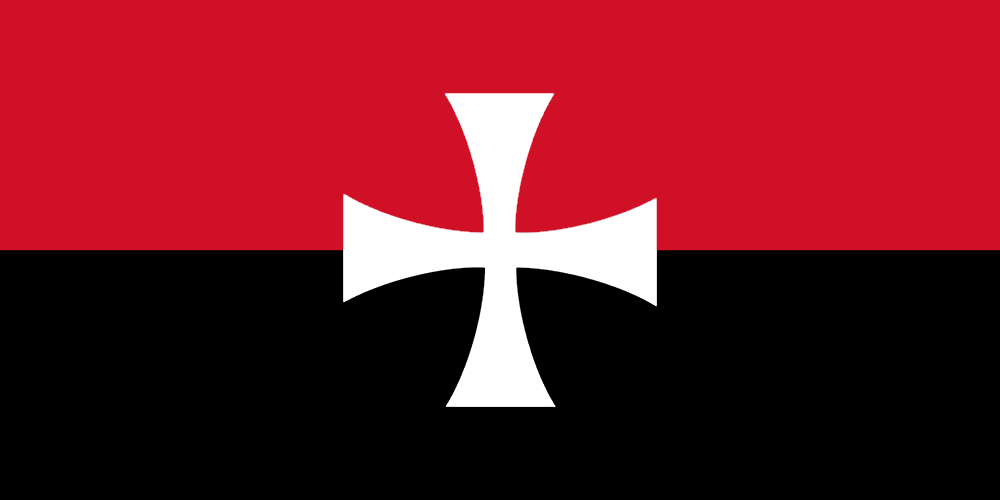

Website
- cnp-nationalist.ca

The Canadian Nationalist Party (French: Parti Nationaliste Canadien) was a far-right, white nationalist political party in Canada. It was registered with Elections Canada from 2019 to 2022. It never won a seat in the House of Commons and its candidates consistently finished last in their races. The party was led by its founder Travis Patron from its inception in 2017 until his arrest for wilful promotion of hate in 2021. He was succeeded by Gus Stefanis.

== History ==
The Canadian Nationalist Party (CNP) was founded on June 1, 2017, by Travis Patron.

On August 9, 2017, coinciding with the Unite the Right rally in Charlottesville, Virginia, the CNP organized the Toronto Nationalist Rally at the University of Toronto's St. George campus. The event's Facebook page described the rally as an opportunity to "discuss the nationalist movement in Canada," and to protest Canada's immigration policy. A counter-protest was organized in response to the rally, and the University of Toronto denied the party the opportunity to organize on campus grounds.

In November 2017, Patron announced his intention to officially register the CNP as a federal political party and field candidates for the 2019 federal election. On November 26, he started a cross-country tour in Toronto. During the tour, the party's meeting at the Belgian Club in Winnipeg, Manitoba, was cancelled following protests. The club's treasurer subsequently resigned, and the organization voluntarily withdrew from Folklorama, the city's multicultural festival. In early September 2018, Patron reached out to People's Party of Canada leader Maxime Bernier "to see if there would be any interest in possibly co-operating with the Canadian Nationalist Party." Bernier declined any further discussions with Patron.

In June 2019, CNP members were among several far-right groups protesting against Pride parades alongside Yellow Vest demonstrators in Hamilton, Ontario, and Pegida in downtown Toronto. Both protests resulted in violence against counter-protesters, with the latter demonstration resulting in a violent altercation between anti-fascist counter-protesters inside the Eaton Centre. The RCMP launched a hate crime investigation against Patron in June 2019, after Ottawa-based human rights lawyer Richard Warman filed a formal criminal complaint about a video Patron uploaded to YouTube warning of a "parasitic tribe" controlling Canadian institutions and calling for their permanent removal from Canada. During the investigation, the RCMP pursued intellectual property violations against the CNP for using RCMP trademarks without permission. On August 23, 2019, the party lost their registered virtual office location in the Toronto Star Building after Telsec revoked their services.

Elections Canada informed the CNP on August 29, 2019, that it was eligible for registration as a federal political party. The CNP was subsequently registered two weeks later on September 15.

Patron ran under the party banner in the 2019 federal election, contesting Souris—Moose Mountain, the electoral district containing his hometown of Redvers in Saskatchewan. The party also fielded candidates in Lac-Saint-Louis and Scarborough-Guildwood. The party did not win any seats and finished last out of 21 parties, garnering only 281 votes.

A complaint was filed with the RCMP against Patron by the Friends of Simon Wiesenthal Center on July 15, 2020. In their complaint they claim that a post on the party's Facebook page constitutes hate speech. Patron was arrested by the RCMP and charged with wilful promotion of hate on February 17, 2021, in connection to the complaint.

Gus Stefanis assumed leadership of the party on August 27, 2021.

The CNP was deregistered by Elections Canada on March 31, 2022, due to its failure to maintain an active party membership of at least 250.

== Ideology and policies ==
The CNP was described as far-right, white nationalist, and right-wing populist. Its stated purpose was "to improve the social and economic conditions of an ethnocentric Canada" by maintaining the demographic majority status of European Canadians. The party proposed discontinuing public funding for pride parades, restricting abortion access, establishing a mandatory national curriculum based on "European and Christian values", and repealing the Canadian Multiculturalism Act.

== Election results ==
Canadian federal election results
Election	Leader	Candidates	Votes	% of votes	% of votes in ridings contested	Seats won	+/−	Position	Status
2019	Travis Patron	3	281	0.00	0.20	0 / 338	Steady	21st	No seats
2021	Gus Stefanis	1	52	0.00	0.14	0 / 338	Steady	▼22nd	No seats
