= John James Smith =

Canadian politician

J. J. Smith

Member of Parliament for Moose Mountain
- In office June 1949 – August 1953
- Preceded by: riding created
- Succeeded by: Edward McCullough

Personal details
- Born: 9 May 1912 Storthoaks, Saskatchewan, Canada
- Died: 23 June 1987 (aged 75) Winnipeg, Manitoba, Canada
- Party: Liberal
- Spouse(s): Marie Jeanne Laura Eva Bourget m. 27 September 1933
- Children: Lorne Alfred (d. 1976), Jeannette Henschel; Maurice F. "Bud"
- Profession: farmer

John James "J.J." Smith (9 May 1912 – 23 June 1987) was a Liberal party member of the House of Commons of Canada. Born in Storthoaks, Saskatchewan, Canada, he was educated at Fertile, Saskatchewan and became a farmer by career.

Smith became reeve of Storthoaks No. 31, Saskatchewan, the youngest person in Saskatchewan at that time to hold a municipal leadership.

He was first elected to Parliament at the Moose Mountain riding in the 1949 general election. After serving his only federal term, the 21st Canadian Parliament, Smith was defeated in the 1953 election by Edward McCullough of the Co-operative Commonwealth Federation. Smith was unsuccessful at winning the Moose Mountain riding in 1957 and 1958.

J.J. Smith died on 23 June 1987 at Winnipeg. He had resided in Burnaby, British Columbia at the time of his death.
