= Archibald Riddell (politician) =

Canadian politician

Archibald W. Riddell (1865 – 1945) was a farmer and political figure in Saskatchewan. He represented Souris in the Legislative Assembly of Saskatchewan from 1908 to 1912 as a Provincial Rights Party member. He was born in Burns, Canada West, the son of George Riddell. In 1887, Riddell married Katherine Strachan. He lived in Oxbow, Saskatchewan.
