= Levi Thomson =

Canadian politician (1855–1938)

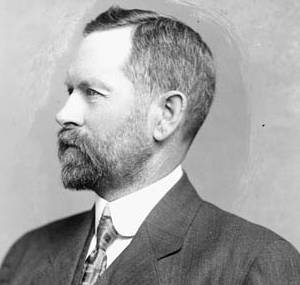

Member of the House of Commons of Canada
- In office 1911–1921
- Constituency: Qu'Appelle

Personal details
- Born: February 17, 1855; Erin Township, Canada West, Province of Canada
- Died: April 14, 1938 (aged 83); Wolseley, Saskatchewan, Canada
- Political party: Liberal; Unionist

Levi Thomson, KC (February 17, 1855 – April 14, 1938) was a farmer, lawyer, and political figure in Saskatchewan, Canada. He represented Qu'Appelle in the House of Commons of Canada from 1911 to 1921 as a Liberal and then Unionist member.

He was born in Erin Township, Canada West, the son of John Thomson, a native of Scotland, and Sarah McMillan. He began studying law in Toronto before moving west in 1882, and settling on a farm in Wolseley. In 1884, he married Mabel Maud Perley, the daughter of William Dell Perley. Thomson completed his legal studies in Regina in 1894 and practised law in Wolseley. He served as crown prosecutor from 1897 to 1904, resigning to run unsuccessfully for a seat in the House of Commons. Thomson was an unsuccessful candidate for a seat in the Saskatchewan assembly in 1905. In 1913, he was named King's Counsel. He served on the council for Wolseley from 1889 to 1903 and was mayor in 1904. Thomson also served on the board of governors for the University of Saskatchewan. He died in Wolseley at the age of 83.

== Electoral record ==
1917 Canadian federal election: Qu'Appelle
Party	Candidate	Votes
Government (Unionist)	Levi Thomson	acclaimed

1911 Canadian federal election: Qu'Appelle
Party	Candidate	Votes	%	±%
Liberal	Levi Thomson	4,298	52.6	+2.9
Conservative	Richard Stuart Lake	3,874	47.4	-2.9
Total valid votes		8,172	100.0	
