= Jesse Pickard Tripp =

Canadian politician

Member of Parliament for Assiniboia
- In office March 1940 – June 1945
- Preceded by: James Garfield Gardiner
- Succeeded by: Edward McCullough

Personal details
- Born: 7 May 1883 Forest, Ontario, Canada
- Died: 6 September 1971 (aged 88)
- Party: Liberal
- Profession: pharmacist

Jesse Pickard Tripp (7 May 1883 – 6 September 1971) was a Canadian politician serving in municipal, provincial and federal governments. He was born in Forest, Ontario and became a pharmacist by career. His name also appears as Jesse Pichard Tripp or Jesse Picard Tripp in some sources.

The son of Newton Tripp, he was educated in Forest, apprenticed in a drugstore and continued his studies at the University of Toronto, receiving a degree in pharmacy. He also played baseball professionally. In 1906, he moved to Oxbow, Saskatchewan and became the first official druggist there. He married Elizabeth Dorothea Williams in 1909. In 1919, Tripp studied optometry at the University of Toronto and practised in Oxbow until 1961.

Tripp was mayor of Oxbow in 1924 and 1925. In 1925, he became a provincial Liberal member of the Legislative Assembly of Saskatchewan and served at Souris riding until 1929. He returned to the Saskatchewan legislature from 1934 to 1938 at Souris-Estevan riding.

He was elected as a Liberal party member of the House of Commons of Canada at the Assiniboia riding in the 1940 general election. Tripp was defeated in the 1945 election by Edward McCullough of the Co-operative Commonwealth Federation.

In 1950, Tripp was named to the Board of the Governors of the Canadian Broadcasting Corporation, representing Saskatchewan and Alberta for five years. He also was a baseball coach for young people in Oxbow and chaired the group that built the first ice hockey and curling rink there. He died on 6 September 1971.
