= Lawrence Watson (politician) =

Canadian politician

Lawrence E. Watson
- Official 1966 portrait

Member of Parliament for Assiniboia
- In office April 1963 – April 1968

Personal details
- Born: 31 October 1917 Avonlea, Saskatchewan
- Died: 22 December 1990 (aged 73)
- Party: Progressive Conservative
- Profession: farmer, farmer

Lawrence E. Watson (31 October 1917 – 22 December 1990) was a Progressive Conservative party member of the House of Commons of Canada. He was born in Avonlea, Saskatchewan and became a farmer and farmer by career.

He was first elected at the Assiniboia riding in the 1963 general election after an unsuccessful attempt to win the riding in 1962. Watson was re-elected there in 1965 but defeated in 1968. He also contested an 8 November 1971 by-election at Assiniboia but again was unable to win back the seat in Parliament.
