= Joseph Thauberger =

Canadian politician (1909–1998)

Leader of the Canada Party
- In office 1993–1994
- Preceded by: Party Established*
- Succeeded by: Claire Foss

Personal details
- Born: August 26, 1909; Bessarabia, Russian Empire (now Moldova)
- Died: April 21, 1998 (aged 88); Regina, Saskatchewan, Canada

Joseph Thauberger (August 26, 1909 – April 21, 1998) was a Canadian politician. Born in Bessarabia (now Moldova), he emigrated to Canada from Russia with his parents, Andreas Thauberger and Maria Eva (née Bähr) in 1911.

In the 1972 federal election, Thauberger ran for the Social Credit Party of Canada in the riding of Qu'Appelle, Saskatchewan. He placed last in a field of four candidates, with 839 votes (3.1% of the total).

Joseph Thauberger helped establish the Canada Party in the early 1990s to promote a policy of nationalism and monetary reform. He became the first leader of that party.

In the 1993 election, he ran for the Canada Party in the riding of Regina—Qu'Appelle, Saskatchewan. He placed last in a field of six candidates, with 178 votes (0.55% of the total).

Thauberger stepped down from the party leadership in 1994 and was replaced by Claire Foss. The party merged into the Canadian Action Party in 1997. Joseph Thauberger died in Regina, Saskatchewan in April 1998. He is buried in Riverside Cemetery in Regina.

Joseph Thauberger's son, Dr. Patrick Cyril Thauberger, disappeared in Regina in 1997 while travelling from Winnipeg to Edmonton. His body was later found in a slough on the family farm, having been put there by his brother Joe, who was later convicted of his murder.

The Regina Police Service arrested Patrick Thauberger's older brother Joseph George Thauberger, on November 29, 2020, on charges of first degree murder in Patrick's death, offering an indignity to a human body and uttering threats to a woman (between 1997 and 2014). He was convicted of second degree murder in 2023.

== Electoral record ==
1935 Canadian federal election: Qu'Appelle
Party	Candidate	Votes	%	±%
Conservative	Ernest Perley	5,769	36.6	
Liberal	James Alexander McCowan	5,579	35.4	-17.9
Co-operative Commonwealth	John Frederick Herman	2,210	14.0	
Social Credit	Joseph Alois Thauberger	2,186	13.9	
Total valid votes		15,744	100.0	
