= Robert Wauchope =

Robert Wauchope may refer to:

- Robert Wauchope (archaeologist) (1909–1979), American archaeologist
- Robert Wauchope (bishop) (fl. 1539–1551), Archbishop of Armagh
- Robert Wauchope (Royal Navy officer) (1788–1862), Royal Navy Admiral and inventor of the time ball

== See also ==
- Robert Wauch (1786–1866), Royal Navy Captain and namesake of Wauchope, New South Wales
- Wauchope (disambiguation)
