= Wauchope =

Wauchope may refer to

== Places ==
- Wauchope, New South Wales
- Wauchope, Saskatchewan
- Wauchope Forest, Scotland
- Wauchope, Scottish Borders
- Wauchope, Dumfries and Galloway
- Wauchope, a small town in Davenport, Northern Territory, Australia

== People ==
- Andrew Gilbert Wauchope (1846–1899), British soldier; killed in action at Magersfontein, South Africa
- Andrew Ramsay Don-Wauchope, Scottish rugby player
- Archibald Wauchope of Niddrie, Scottish landowner
- Sir Arthur Grenfell Wauchope (1874–1947), British soldier and colonial administrator.
- Robert Wauchope (archaeologist) (1909–1979), American archaeologist
- Robert Wauchope (archbishop) (fl. 1539–1551), Archbishop of Armagh
- Robert Wauchope (Royal Navy officer) (1788–1862), Royal Navy Admiral and Inventor of the time ball

== Other uses ==
- Don-Wauchope baronets
