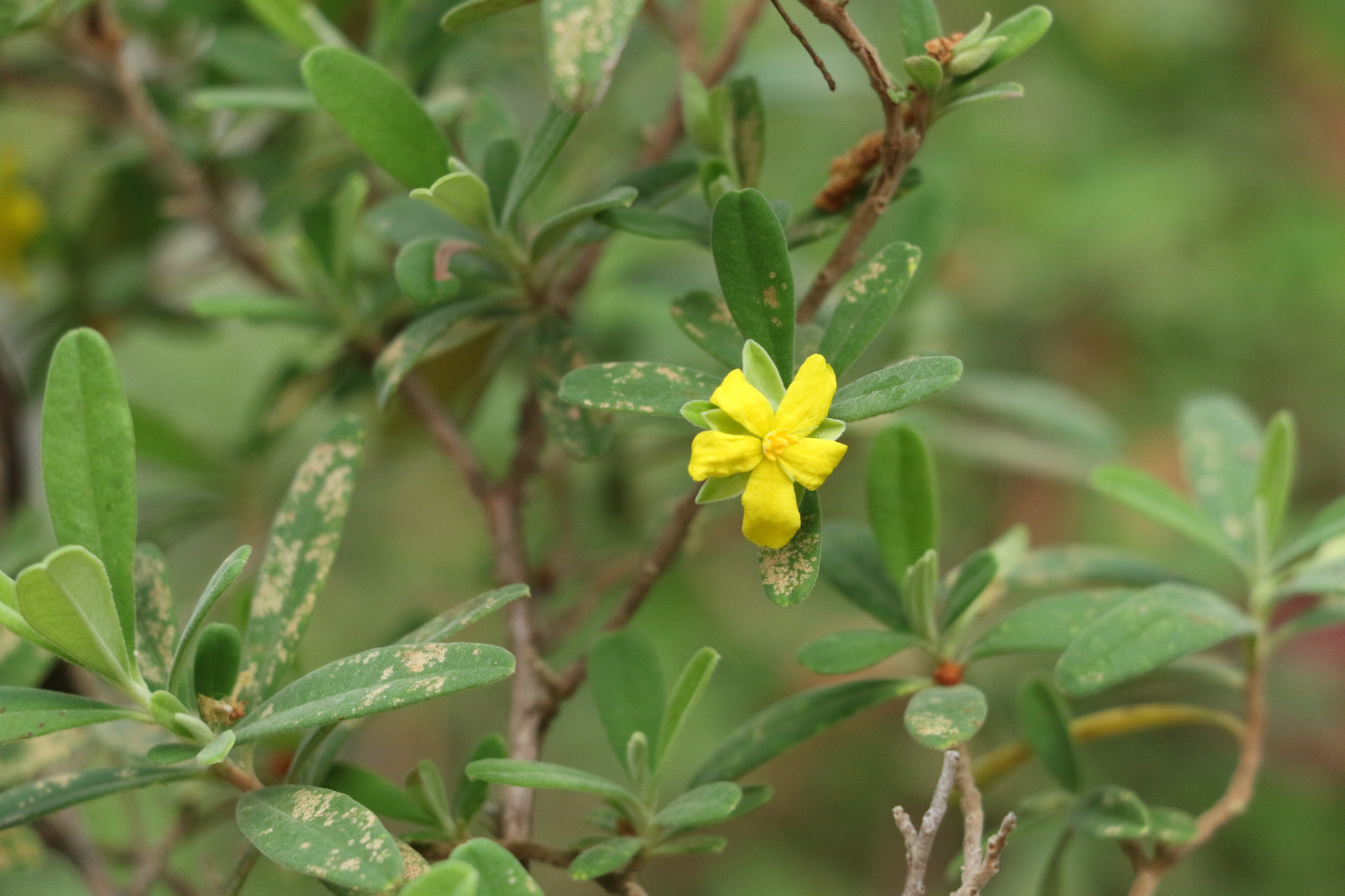

Conservation status
- Endangered (NSWBCA)

Scientific classification
- Kingdom: Plantae
- Clade: Tracheophytes
- Clade: Angiosperms
- Clade: Eudicots
- Order: Dilleniales
- Family: Dilleniaceae
- Genus: Hibbertia
- Species: H. hexandra

Binomial name
- Hibbertia hexandra C.T.White

= Hibbertia hexandra =

Species of plant

Hibbertia hexandra, commonly known as tree guinea flower, is a species of flowering plant in the family Dilleniaceae, and is endemic to eastern Australia. It is a tall shrub or small tree with mostly lance-shaped leaves with the narrower end towards the base and yellow flowers arranged singly in leaf axils, with six stamens arranged around two hairy carpels.

== Description ==
Hibbertia hexandra is a tall shrub or small tree with its branches covered with star-shaped hairs. The leaves are elliptic to lance-shaped with the narrower end towards the base, 20–60 mm (0.79–2.36 in) long and 5–15 mm (0.20–0.59 in) wide on a petiole 5–20 mm (0.20–0.79 in) long. The upper surface of the leaves is glabrous with minute pimples and the lower surface is whitish and covered with star-shaped hairs. The flowers are arranged singly in leaf axils on a peduncle 7–10 mm (0.28–0.39 in) long and have hairy sepals 7–8 mm (0.28–0.31 in) long. The five petals are yellow, about 7 mm (0.28 in) long and there are six stamens arranged around the two hairy carpels, each carpel with two ovules.

== Taxonomy ==
Hibbertia hexandra was first formally described in 1942 by Cyril Tenison White in the Proceedings of the Royal Society of Queensland from specimens he collected in Lamington National Park in 1934. The specific epithet (hexandra) means "six stamens", referring to the leaves.

== Distribution and habitat ==
This hibbertia grows in rainforest, open forest and heath, mostly in the ranges near the Queensland-New South Wales border. Collections near Wauchope may be of a new species.

== Conservation status ==
Hibbertia hexandra is listed as "endangered" under the Biodiversity Conservation Act 2016 and as "near threatened" under the Queensland Government Nature Conservation Act 1992.

== See also ==
- List of Hibbertia species
