= Big Bull =

Coordinates: 31°26.3514′S 152°44.5662′E

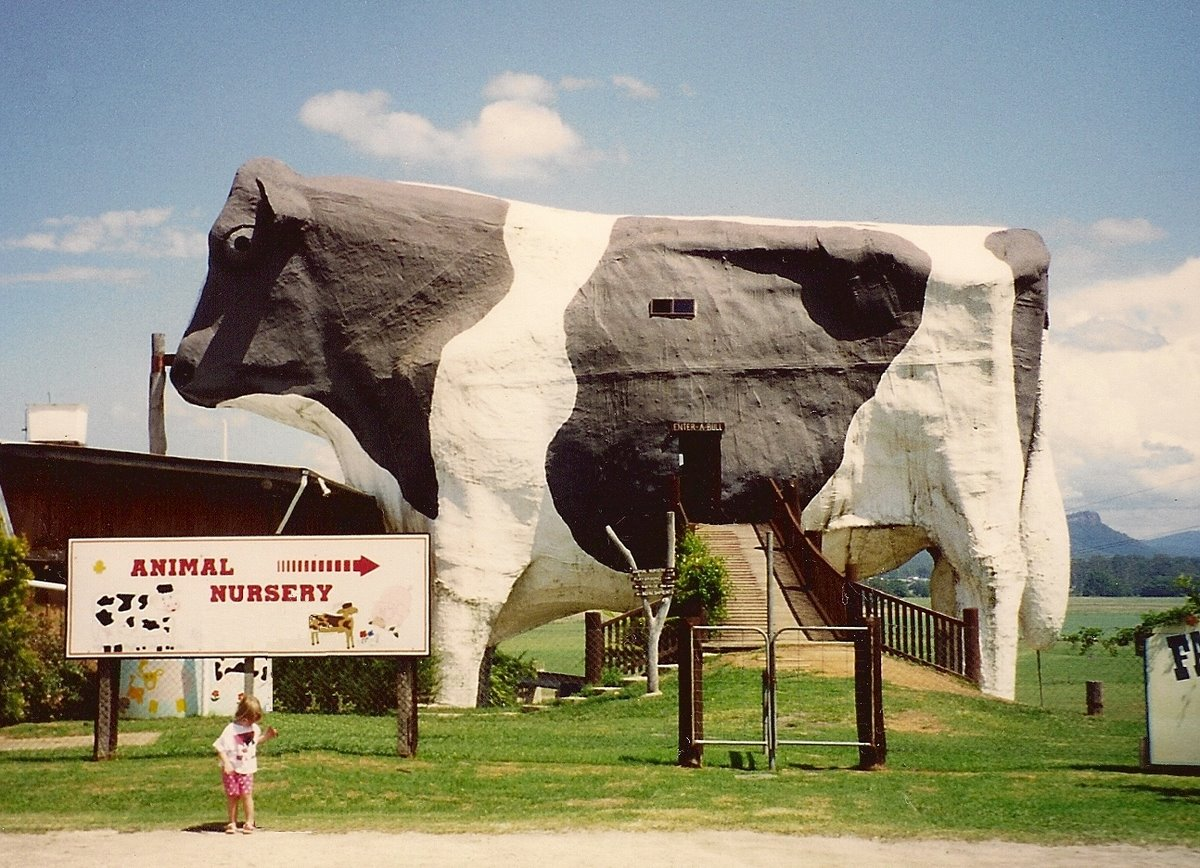
The Big Bull in 1993

The Big Bull was a large (14 metres × 21 metres) Holstein bull fibreglass model located near Wauchope, New South Wales, Australia. When open, it contained a gift shop on the ground floor and a beef display.

It was located just off the Oxley Highway between Wauchope and the Pacific Highway. The structure was torn down in October 2007.

The Big Bull notably had a swinging set of testicles.

== See also ==
- Australia's big things
- List of world's largest roadside attractions
- Timbertown
