= Rural Municipality of Antler No. 61 =

Rural municipality in Saskatchewan, Canada

Antler No. 61
- Rural municipality
- Rural Municipality of Antler No. 61
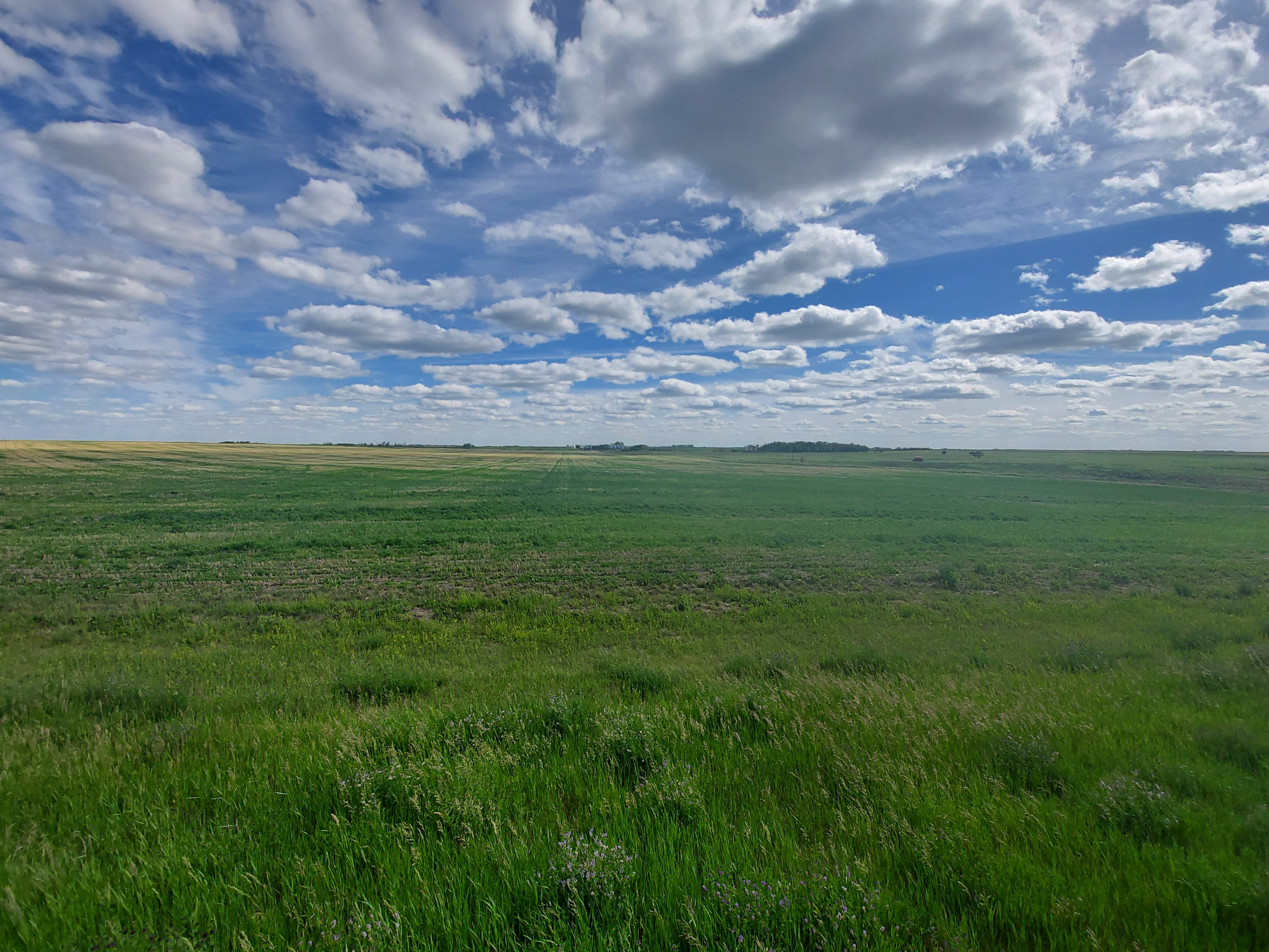
- RM of Antler 61 with Gainsborough Creek to the right

- Location of the RM of Antler No. 61 in Saskatchewan
- Coordinates: 49.577°N 101.799°W
- Country: Canada
- Province: Saskatchewan
- Census division: 1
- SARM division: 1
- Federal riding: Souris—Moose Mountain
- Provincial riding: Cannington
- Formed: December 13, 1909

Government
  - Reeve: Bernard Bauche
  - Governing body: RM of Antler No. 61 Council
  - Administrator: Melissa Roberts
  - Office location: Redvers

Area (2016)
  - Land: 832.81 km^{2} (321.55 sq mi)

Population (2016)
  - Total: 523
  - Density: 0.6/km^{2} (1.6/sq mi)
- Time zone: CST
  - Summer (DST): CST
- Postal code: S0C 2H0
- Area codes: 306 and 639

The Rural Municipality of Antler No. 61 (2016 population: 523) is a rural municipality (RM) in the Canadian province of Saskatchewan within Census Division No. 1 and SARM Division No. 1.

== History ==
The RM of Antler No. 61 incorporated as a rural municipality on December 13, 1909.

== Geography ==
=== Communities and localities ===
The following urban municipalities are surrounded by the RM.

Towns

- Redvers

The following unincorporated communities are within the RM.

Special service areas

- Antler

Localities

- Frys
- Wauchope

== Demographics ==
Population history (1981–2016)
| Year | Pop. | ±% |
|---|---|---|
| 1981 | 774 | — |
| 1986 | 745 | −3.7% |
| 1991 | 655 | −12.1% |
| 1996 | 664 | +1.4% |
| 2001 | 582 | −12.3% |
| 2006 | 506 | −13.1% |
| 2011 | 536 | +5.9% |
| 2016 | 523 | −2.4% |
Source: Statistics Canada via Saskatchewan Bureau of Statistics

In the 2021 Census of Population conducted by Statistics Canada, the RM of Antler No. 61 had a population of 451 living in 179 of its 199 total private dwellings, a change of −13.8% from its 2016 population of 523. With a land area of 804.28 km^{2} (310.53 sq mi), it had a population density of 0.6/km^{2} (1.5/sq mi) in 2021.

In the 2016 Census of Population, the RM of Antler No. 61 recorded a population of 523 living in 202 of its 240 total private dwellings, a −9.4% change from its 2011 population of 577. With a land area of 832.81 km^{2} (321.55 sq mi), it had a population density of 0.6/km^{2} (1.6/sq mi) in 2016.

== Government ==
Antler federal election results
| Year | Liberal | | Conservative | | New Democratic | | Green | |
|---|---|---|---|---|---|---|---|---|
| 2021 | 3% | 8 | 82% | 230 | 4% | 11 | 0% | 0 |
| 2019 | 4% | 12 | 89% | 276 | 3% | 8 | 1% | 3 |

Antler provincial election results
| Year | Saskatchewan | | New Democratic | |
|---|---|---|---|---|
| 2020 | 88% | 193 | 2% | 5 |
| 2016 | 94% | 264 | 3% | 10 |

The RM of Antler No. 61 is governed by an elected municipal council and an appointed administrator that meets on the second Tuesday of every month. The reeve of the RM is Bernard Bauche while its administrator is Melissa Roberts. The RM's office is located in Redvers.

== Transportation ==
Rail

- Souris - Arcola - Regina Section C.P.R—serves Reston, Sinclair, Antler, Frys, Wauchope, Manor, Carlyle, Arcola, Kisbey, Forget, Stoughton

Roads

- Highway 13—serves Redvers
- Highway 600—continues east from Highway 13 to Manitoba -Saskatchewan border
- Highway 8—serves Redvers
- Highway 601—North south Highway section west of Redvers

== See also ==
- List of francophone communities in Saskatchewan
- List of rural municipalities in Saskatchewan
