= Antler, Saskatchewan =

Community in Saskatchewan, Canada

Antler
- Special service area
- Special Service Area of Antler
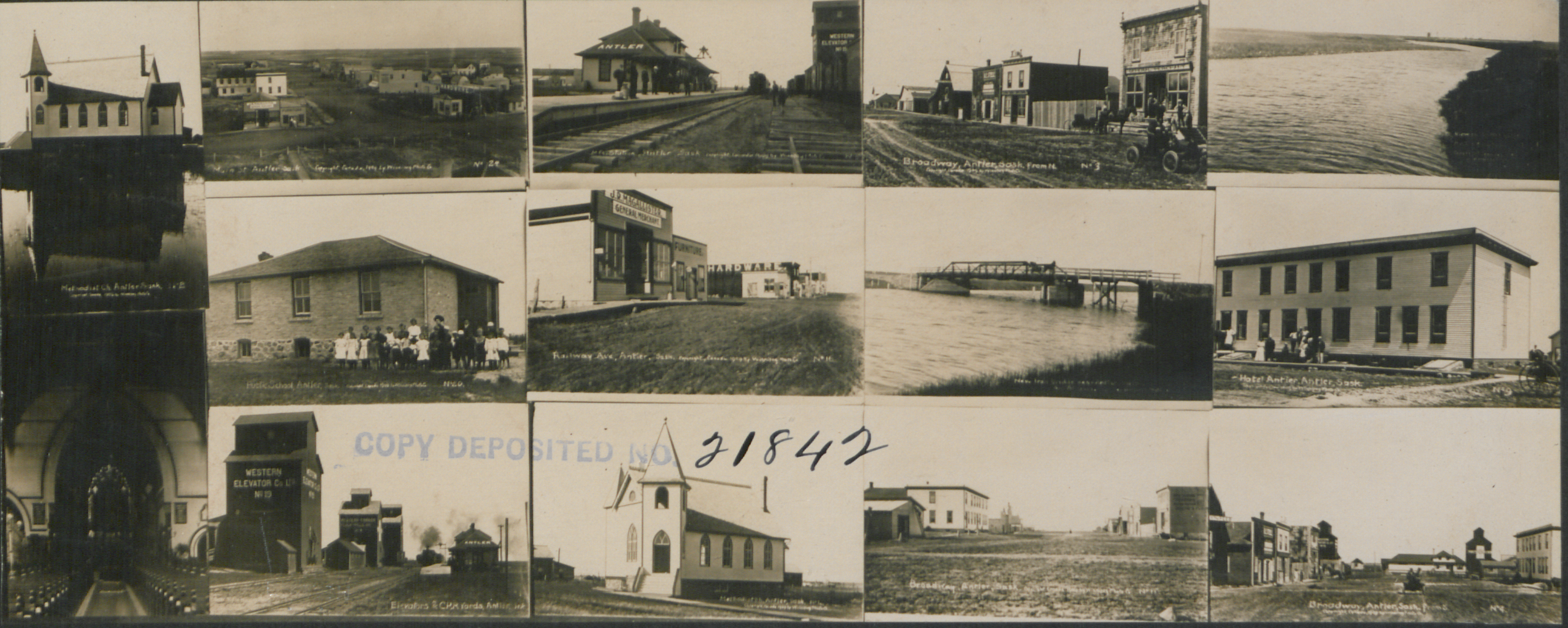
- Views of Antler, 1909

- Location within Saskatchewan Location within Canada
- Coordinates: 49°34′07″N 101°27′28″W
- Country: Canada
- Province: Saskatchewan
- Region: south-east
- Census division: 1
- Rural Municipality: Antler No. 61
- Post office Founded: 1 September 1900
- Dissolved (Special service area): 31 December 2013

Government
  - Type: Municipal
  - Governing body: Rural Municipality of Antler No. 61
  - MP: Robert Kitchen
  - MLA: Dan D'Autremont

Population (2016)
  - Total: 40
- Time zone: UTC-6 (CST)
- Postal code: S0C 0E0
- Area code: 306
- Highways: Highway 13 / Highway 600 / Red Coat Trail
- Railways: Canadian Pacific Railway

Antler is a special service area in the Rural Municipality of Antler No. 61, Saskatchewan, Canada. Listed as a designated place by Statistics Canada, the community had a population of 40 in the Canada 2016 Census.

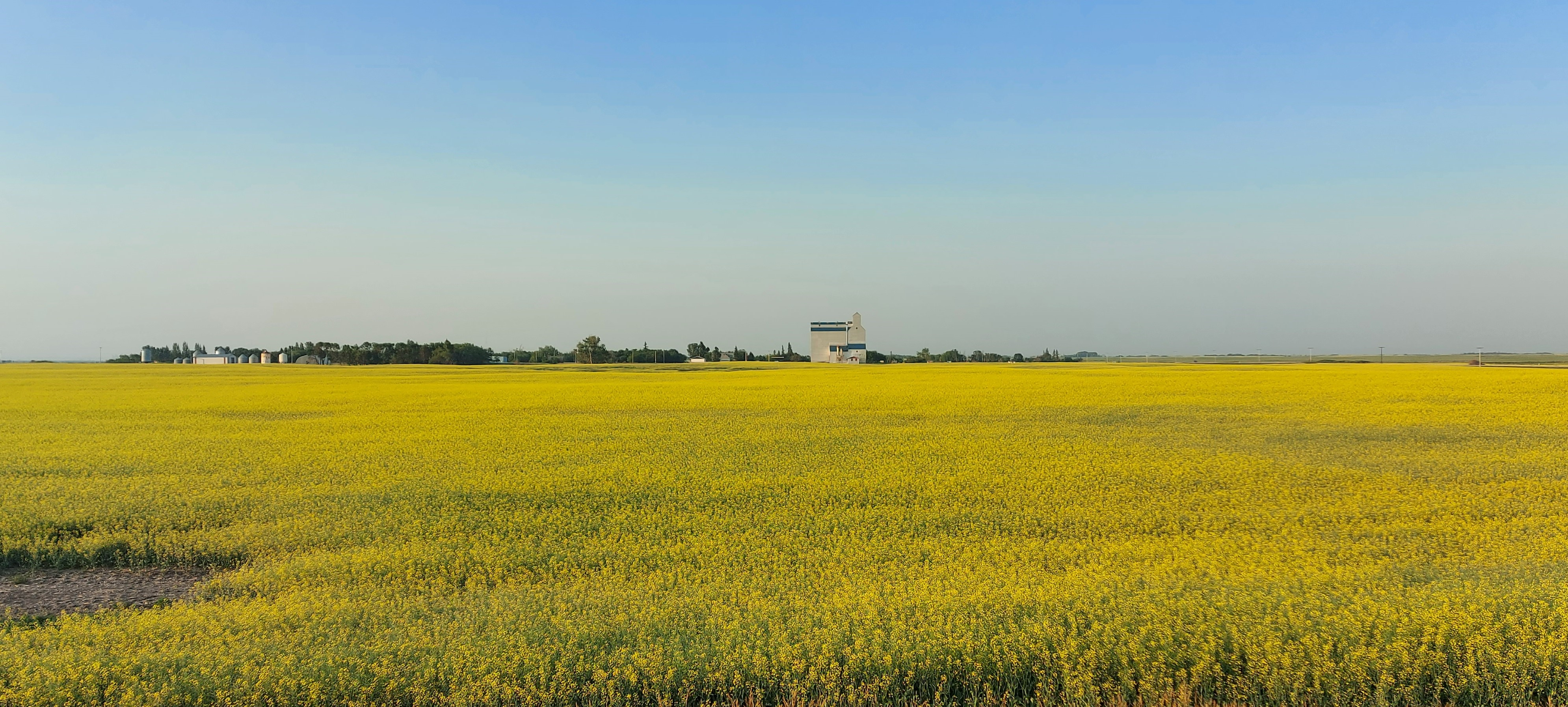
Antler viewed from Highway 13

The community is approximately 120 km east of the city of Estevan and 3 km from the Manitoba border. Antler was dissolved from village status to become part of the Rural Municipality of Antler No. 61 on 31 December 2013.

== Demographics ==
In the 2021 Census of Population conducted by Statistics Canada, Antler had a population of 30 living in 14 of its 17 total private dwellings, a change of −25% from its 2016 population of 40. With a land area of 0.7 km^{2} (0.27 sq mi), it had a population density of 42.9/km^{2} (111.0/sq mi) in 2021.

Canada census – Antler, Saskatchewan community profile

	2016	2011
Population	40 (-2.4% from 2011)	41 (+2.5% from 2006)
Land area	0.72 km^{2} (0.28 sq mi)	0.72 km^{2} (0.28 sq mi)
Population density	55.5/km^{2} (144/sq mi)	56.8/km^{2} (147/sq mi)
Median age	42.5 (M: 46.5, F: 39.0)	41.8 (M: 41.2, F: 50.0)
Private dwellings	24 (total)	21 (total)
Median household income

References: 2016 2011

== See also ==
- List of communities in Saskatchewan
- Block settlement
