= Frys, Saskatchewan =

Community in Saskatchewan, Canada

Coordinates: 49.569°N 101.588°W

Frys, also known as Fry's, is a former locality in the Rural Municipality of Antler No. 61, Saskatchewan, Canada. The community was approximately 10 kilometres (6.2 mi) east of the town of Redvers along Highway 13 and the Canadian Pacific Railway line. Very little remains of the community of Frys.

Frys was named after James Henry Fry, who was the first postmaster from January 1, 1901 until his resignation on December 7, 1915 as well as a Justice of the Peace. Fry's post office was in operation from January 1, 1901 until July 7, 1961 and was located at Sec 14 Twp 7 Rge 31 W1.

== See also ==
- List of communities in Saskatchewan
