= Robert A. Wardhaugh =

Canadian historian and Dungeons & Dragons player (born 1967)

Robert Wardhaugh
- Born: Robert Alexander Wardhaugh; 1967; Redvers, Saskatchewan, Canada
- Education: University of Saskatchewan (B.A., M.A); University of Manitoba (Ph.D.)
- Occupation: Historian
- Employer: University of Western Ontario
- Known for: Hosting the longest uninterrupted game of Dungeons & Dragons
- Website: thegamednd.com

Robert Alexander Wardhaugh (born 1967) is a Canadian historian known as a host of the longest uninterrupted Dungeons & Dragons campaign. As of 2026, the game has been going on for 44 years, since 1982.

== Early life ==
Wardhaugh was born in Redvers, Saskatchewan to Robert "Bob" Wardhaugh, of Ashington, England, and Annie "Ann" Wardhaugh (née Douglas) (1941-2021), of Paisley, Scotland. He has three sisters, Michele (1964-), Annette (1971-), and Moira (1978-). After Wardhaugh's birth, the family moved throughout Saskatchewan, first to Watson, then to Ridgedale, Tisdale, and finally Borden to accommodate the parents' work.

== Education ==
Wardhaugh completed his B.A. and his M.A. in History at the University of Saskatchewan in 1990 with the thesis, "James G. Gardner, Land Policy, and Dominion-Provincial Relations." Following this, he completed his Ph.D. in Canadian History at the University of Manitoba in 1995 with a thesis entitled "Mackenzie King and the Prairie West."

== Career ==
Wardhaugh is a professor at University of Western Ontario, author of several books on Canadian political history. Before that, he worked at the University of Manitoba. and the University of Winnipeg

== Dungeons and Dragons campaign ==
Wardhaugh is known as a host and Dungeon master of the longest uninterrupted Dungeons & Dragons campaign. His game world is vast and incorporates "an 'alternate version of our Earth' which also includes the continent of Tolkien's Middle Earth, picking up 400 years after the destruction of the One Ring". He runs the game based on AD&D 1st edition rules, though the rules changed over the years. "Permadeath" is a rule, meaning that when a character dies in a game the player can't continue the game. The games' website describes it as:

Because the world is an alternative fantasy version of historical Earth, you can choose from any pre-gunpowder society: Roman, Greek, Celtic, Norse, Indigenous, Aztec, Mayan, Incan, Scythian, Persian, Arabic, Japanese, Chinese, Mongolian, African, Babylonian, Sumerian, Phoenician, Assyrian, Slavic, Frankish, Spanish, etc. It is important to remember, however, that these civilizations are placed on their own unique historical timelines. So, some events from our history have happened, while others have not (and will not). Also, remember that you can choose to come from Middle Earth (400 years after the One Ring has been destroyed) or Hyboria (Conan’s world, 500 years after Conan’s death).

Wardaugh started this campaign in 1982, and he said that: "Perhaps 3 weeks has been the longest we've ever gone without a session". The game was covered by Popular Mechanics, Wired, and PC Gamer. Wardaugh created more than 30,000 miniatures for the game. He stated that he wants to run the game as long as he can, "hopefully for all my life, I won't lose my friends."

The campaign's duration has made it dynastic, with players—of which there have been more than 50—playing the children of their previous characters over the course of generations. Permadeath is embraced, and Wardhaugh says, "When your character dies, if you don't have any other characters, you're out of the game." All told, he says "about 500 characters" have come and gone over the past 40 years.

== Selected bibliography ==
- (with Barry Ferguson) The Rowell-Sirois Commission and the Remaking of Canadian Federalism (Vancouver: UBC Press, 2021)
- Behind the Scenes: The Life and Work of W.C. Clark (Toronto: University of Toronto Press, 2010)
- Mackenzie King and the Prairie West (Toronto: University of Toronto Press, 2000)
- (with Alan MacEachern) Origins: Canadian History to Confederation, 8th ed., Nelson, 2017
- (with Alan MacEachern) Destinies: Canadian History since Confederation, 8th ed. Nelson, 2017.
