= Mark Laurie (rugby league) =

Australian rugby league footballer

Personal information
- Born: 23 July 1962 (age 64) Wauchope, New South Wales, Australia

Playing information
- Position: Centre, Lock
Club
Years	Team	Pld	T	G	FG	P
1982–92	Parramatta Eels	205	29	0	0	116
1983–84	Leeds	17	2	0	0	8
1989–90	Leeds	11	1	0	0	4
1992–93	Salford	9	1	0	0	4
	Total	242	33	0	0	132
Representative
Years	Team	Pld	T	G	FG	P
1987–90	NSW Country	2	0	0	0	0
- Relatives: Robert Laurie (brother)

Mark Laurie nicknamed "Pebbles" (born 23 July 1962) is an Australian former professional rugby league footballer who played in the 1980s and 1990s. A New South Wales Country representative centre who later moved to the forwards, he played his club football in the NSWRL Premiership for the Parramatta Eels during their golden period of the 1980s. He also played in England for Leeds and Salford.

== Background ==
Laurie was the fifth of six brothers and the younger brother of Robert Laurie.

== Playing career ==
Born in Wauchope, as a teenager, Laurie was earmarked for greatness, representing North Coast in 1980 and 1981 whilst plying his trade for his local team, the Wauchope Blues Rugby League Club. This caught the attention of Sydney clubs, and in 1982, he would sign with the Parramatta Eels, making his debut off the bench in round 2 that year in a 12–5 win over Balmain at Leichhardt Oval in front of 10,000 fans.

In his debut season, Laurie would make 14 appearances for the Eels, which included a Minor Premiership and a Grand Final victory over the Manly Warringah Sea Eagles 21–8 in front of 50,000 fans at the Sydney Cricket Ground.

1983 again saw Laurie play the majority of the season from the bench in a star-studded team looking to achieve the first three-peat since the 1960s St George Dragons. Laurie would again come off the bench for the Eels as they became the 4th club in Australian Rugby League history to win three consecutive Grand Finals, defeating Manly Warringah Sea Eagles 18–6.

Following this, Laurie established himself as a regular starter filling in at Lock, second row, centre and five/eighth over the next few seasons.

1986 saw Laurie and the Eels return to their winning ways, Parramatta secured another Minor Premiership, which catapulted them to another Grand Final. This Grand Final would be Laurie's first starting role, playing in the second row in the 4–2 victory over arch rivals Canterbury Bankstown Bulldogs in Ray Price's final game.

Following the retirement of Price, Laurie would transition into the lock role whilst filling in at centre and five-eighth when required until retirement at the end of the 1992 season, amassing 205 games in 11 seasons for the Parramatta Eels.

Sporadically throughout his career, Laurie would venture to the English competition, utilising his skillset for Leeds and Salford. His first stint for Leeds, 1983–1984, saw Laurie's worth truly recognised, reaching his 3rd Grand Final in 2 years. Laurie's experience in the League Cup Grand Final would prove instrumental as he was declared man of the match in the victory over Widnes 18–10.

Laurie returned to Leeds in 89–90, where he improved their squad immensely, finishing 2 wins behind Minor Premiers Wigan.

The 1992-1993 English Championship season would be the final season Laurie would play professional rugby league, helping Salford avoid relegation.
