= Wauchope, New South Wales =

Wauchope
- Town
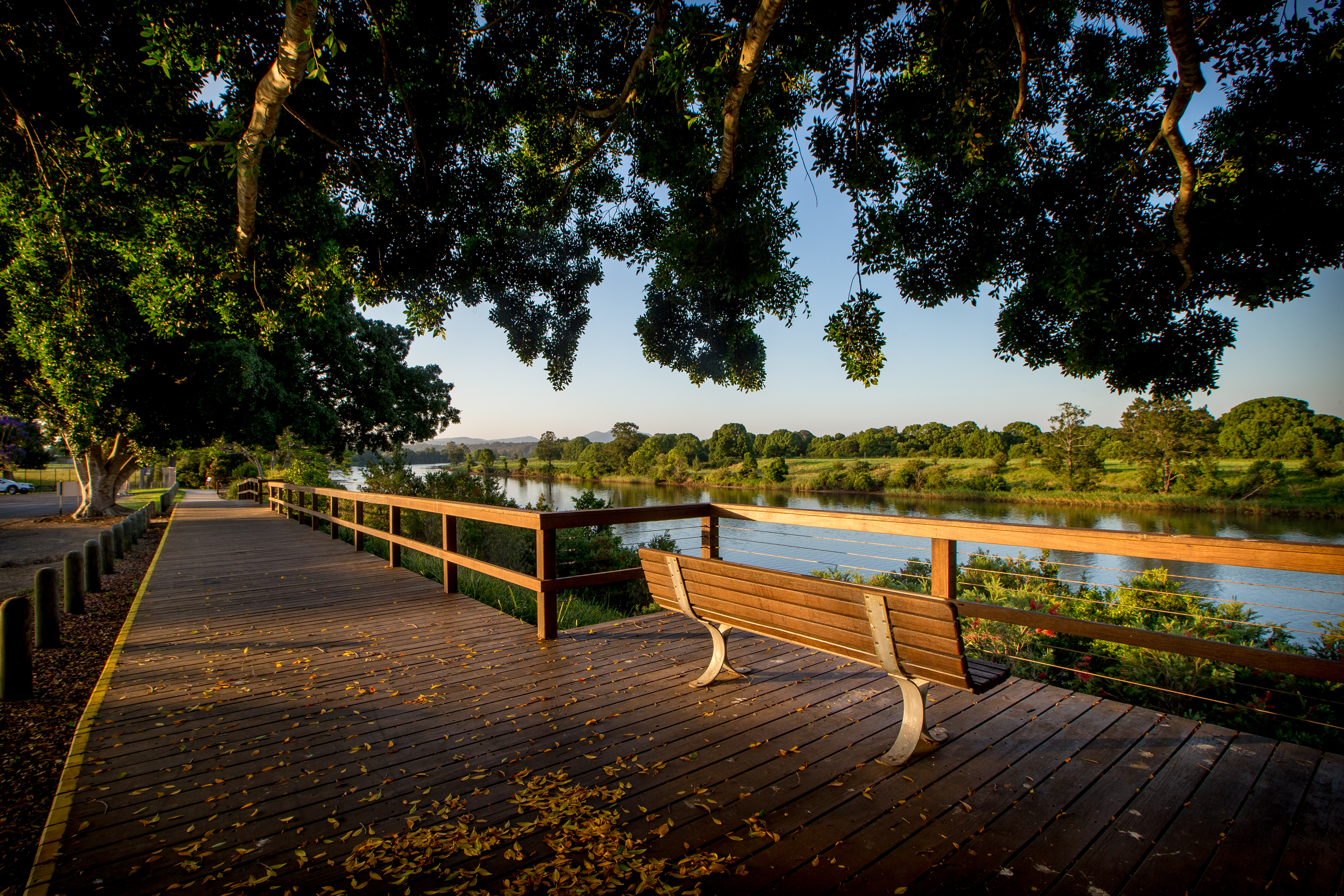
- View of the Hastings River from River Street in Wauchope.

- Coordinates: 31°27′0″S 152°44′0″E
- Country: Australia
- State: New South Wales
- LGA: Port Macquarie-Hastings Council
- Location: 19 km (12 mi) W of Port Macquarie; 383 km (238 mi) NE of Sydney; 545 km (339 mi) S of Brisbane; 58 km (36 mi) S of Kempsey; 69 km (43 mi) NNE of Taree
- Established: 1836

Government
  - State electorate: Oxley
  - Federal division: Lyne
- Elevation: 20 m (66 ft)

Population
  - Total: 7,982 (UCL 2021)
- Postcode: 2446
- County: Macquarie

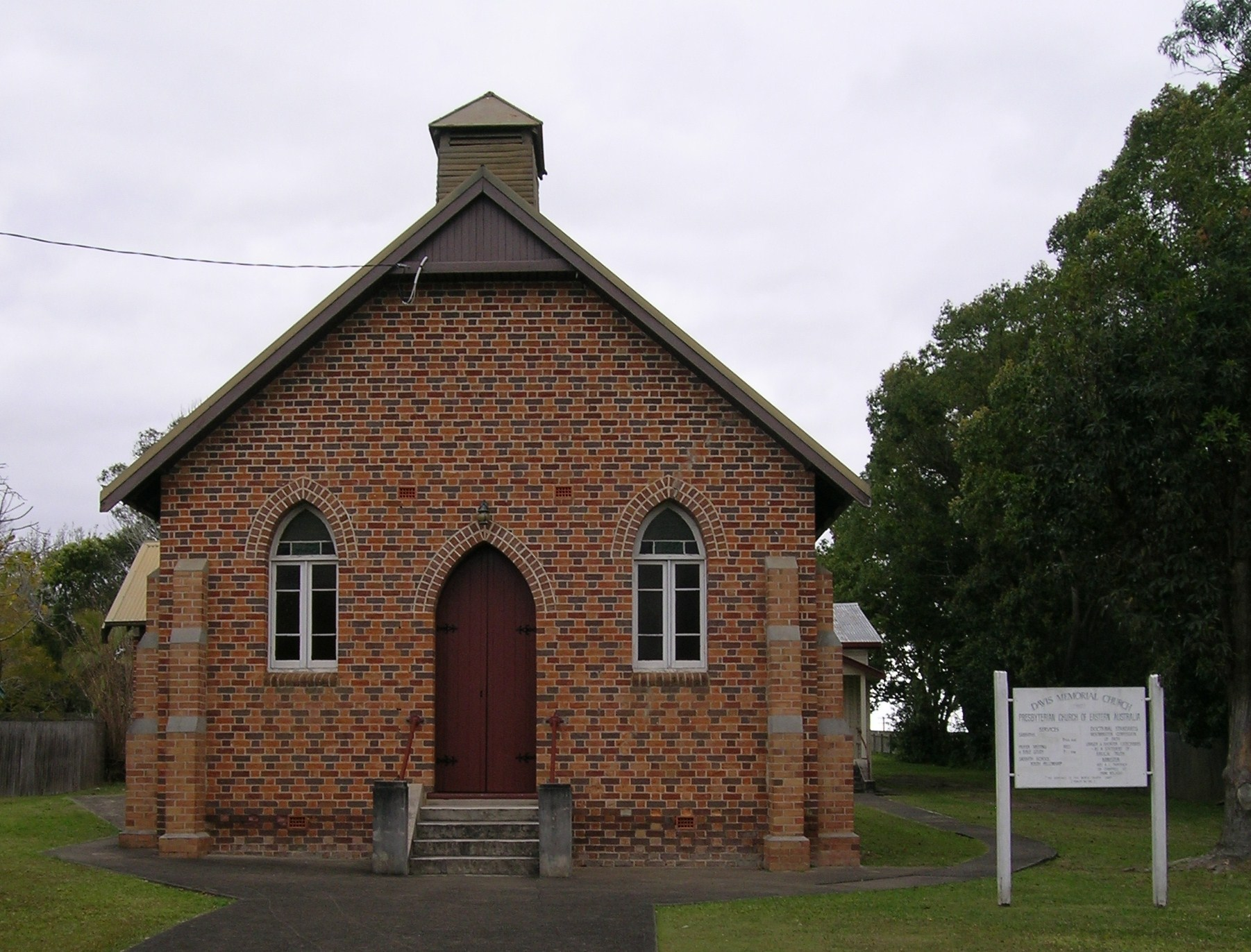
Presbyterian Church of Eastern Australia

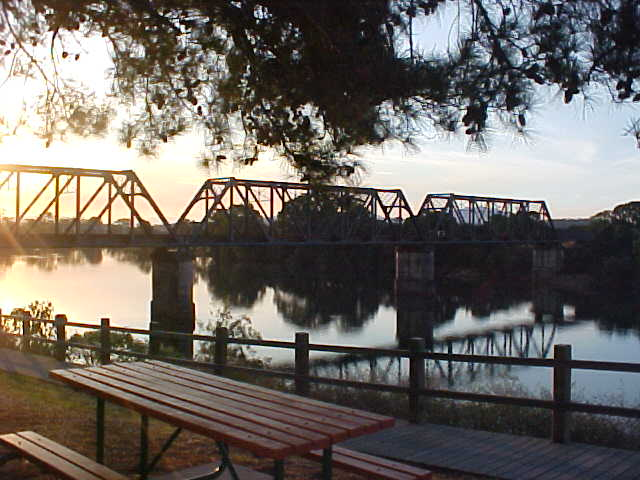
The Hastings River at the northern end of Wauchope with the North Coast Railway bridge.

Wauchope (/ˈwɔːhoʊp/) is a town in the Mid North Coast region of New South Wales, Australia. It is within the boundaries of the Port Macquarie-Hastings Council area. Wauchope is inland on the Hastings River and the Oxley Highway 19 km (12 mi) west of Port Macquarie. The town is 383 km (238 mi) north of the state capital Sydney.

Wauchope is the location of the now closed Timbertown, a popular heritage theme park inspired by the logging industry that formed the basis for Wauchope's early economy and prosperity. The town has a population of approximately 7,500 (as of 2006 – including King Creek and Redbank). It has also played an important role in the Hastings Valley dairy industry.

== History ==
The Birpai (also known as Birrbay) people have lived in this area for more than 40,000 years.

By 1828 a number of land grants had been made along the Hastings River. It was not until 1836 that the village of Wauchope first came into existence. In that year Captain Robert Andrew Wauch (whose father dropped the 'ope' from the end of his name as a result of a family dispute) paid a deposit on 760 acres (3.1 km^{2}) on King Creek. He bought more property and built Wauch House.

Robert Wauch died in the Macleay area in 1866, and the Government Gazette published the deeds of his properties, specifying that they should be called Wauchope. When the post office opened in a nearby settlement in 1881, it was named Wauchope, although the Government Gazette misprinted the name Wanghope, an error that was not corrected until 1889.

It is pronounced war-hope, although the family pronounced their name 'war-cope'. This is similar to the Canadian town which is pronounced 'walk-up'.

== Floods ==
The largest recorded flood in the Hastings River at Wauchope occurred on 13 January 1968 and reached a peak level of 9.1 metres (30 ft) above the Australian height datum (m AHD). The 1968 flood was estimated to be slightly rarer than a 100-year event.

The next largest flood was determined to be the flood of 5 to 7 March 1894. This flood reached a peak flood level of 8.9 m AHD at Wauchope.

Other major floods occurred at Wauchope in February 1950 (8.45 m AHD), February 1929 (8.3 m AHD), August 1864 (8.2 m AHD), and June 1950 (8.1 m AHD).

The 1963 flood, which is notorious for the damage it caused in the lower reaches of the river, is only ranked as the eighth highest flood at Wauchope. It reached a peak level at Wauchope of 7.75 m AHD and was considered to be a 1 in 15-year event at Wauchope.

On 23 February 2013 floodwaters peaked at 7.22 m AHD at 7.30pm after heavy rainfall in the upper catchment area.

== Industry and economy ==
Wauchope's economy was traditionally based on the timber industry. At different stages in its history, more timber was transported out of Wauchope than out of any other town in Australia via Wauchope railway station. Timber from the Yarras Plywood Sawmill near Wauchope was used in the construction of the Sydney Opera House. Many of the mill workers were transported by Parsons Buses to the opening of the Opera House.

Industry in and around Wauchope has transformed primarily into farming and tourism. The town also serves as a 'dormitory suburb' for the nearby and much larger Port Macquarie. Increasingly, Wauchope and its surrounding villages and farms are becoming known for gourmet produce, including cheeses, wines and organic fruits and vegetables. The Hastings Farmers Markets are held at the Wauchope Showground on the 4th Saturday of every month and showcase a wide variety of local produce.

Timbertown, the town's best-known tourist attraction, is a colonial-era themed village, which is located on the outskirts of Wauchope. It features static displays and attractions such as a working steam train, bullock team, and a Cobb and Co stage coach. It closed in early 2026.

The Big Bull was a notable tourist attraction between Wauchope and Port Macquarie for twenty years, but was removed in 2007.

Other important attractions include the historical society, historic buildings, Broken Bago vineyards and natural attractions including state forests and Bago Bluff National Park.

Wauchope railway station serves as an interchange for passengers travelling to nearby coastal centres such as Port Macquarie.

Historical population
Year	Pop.	±%
1954	2,498	—
1961	3,038	+21.6%
1966	3,173	+4.4%
1971	3,357	+5.8%
1976	3,525	+5.0%
1981	3,645	+3.4%
1986	4,181	+14.7%
1991	4,297	+2.8%
1996	4,693	+9.2%
2001	4,759	+1.4%
2006	5,503	+15.6%
2011	6,372	+15.8%
2016	6,881	+8.0%
2021	7,982	+16.0%
Source: Australian Bureau of Statistics data.

== Layout ==
The township is set out along the southern bank of the Hastings River with the back drop of Bago Mountain further south.

The main street is High Street (a small section of the Oxley Highway), running generally westward through the town after coming east from Port Macquarie and across the North Coast railway line. The main street includes the Co-op general store (previously Parkers) and a number of smaller businesses and local bank branches. At the corner of Hastings Street is the local post office. Further up the main street is the town clock, a legacy of the days the town was the centre of the Hastings Shire local government area. Back along Hastings Street is the Co-op supermarket as well as the court house. In 2009 work commenced on the rebuilding of this supermarket. The old building was completely demolished and a much larger and more modern structure was completed and opened in 2010.

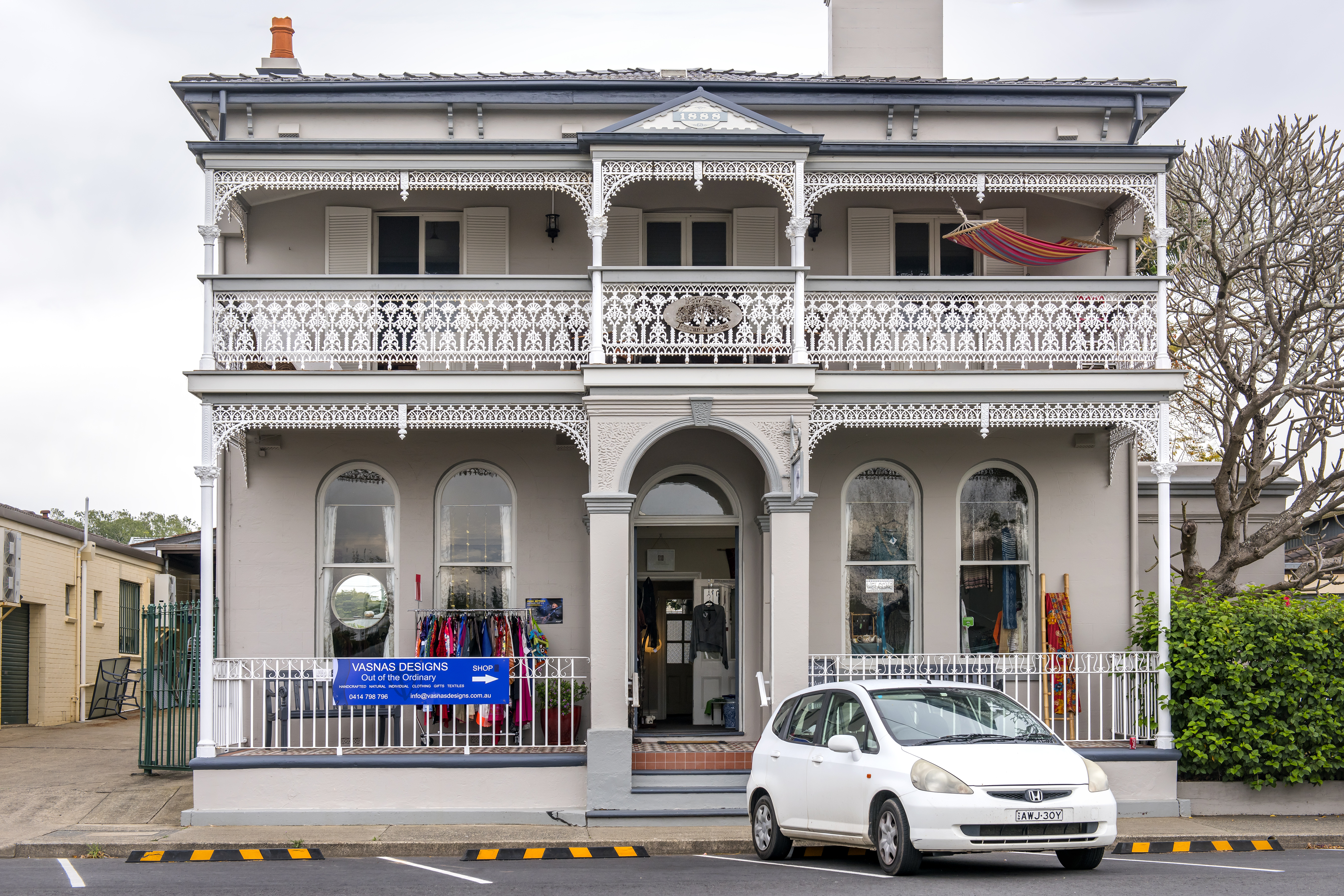
Heritage building on Cameron Street in Wauchope NSW.

The main cross street is Cameron Street. The Hastings Hotel is on the south-east corner of Cameron and High and the Star Hotel is a short distance north. The RSL club is another 100 m (330 ft) north. Cameron Street leads to the Hastings River. A wharf was built at the northern end of Cameron Street for shipping produce downstream to Port Macquarie, but this no longer exists.

South of the main shopping area is the Wauchope Golf Course and Country Club, which occupies a premium site within the middle of the town. Further west is Timbertown, on the edge of large tracts of forestry land leading into the Bago Mountain area. Timbertown closed in early 2026.

East of the main shopping area is the railway line from Sydney. The Hastings dairy and milk factory is located close to the point where the railway line crosses the Hastings River.

== Schools ==
- Wauchope Public School
- St Joseph's Primary School
- Wauchope High School

== Transport ==
Wauchope has its own railway station on the North Coast Line between New South Wales and Queensland. It is serviced by six NSW TrainLink trains per day, three heading south (to Sydney) and three heading further north to Grafton, Casino, and Brisbane. Passengers can alight at this station for connecting coaches to the nearby Port Macquarie. Air travel is served by Port Macquarie Airport, which is located 21 km (13 mi) east of Wauchope.

== Media ==
=== Radio stations ===
Radio stations that broadcast to the town are ABC Mid North Coast, Triple M Mid North Coast, hit Mid North Coast, and 2WAY FM, a community-based station which broadcast on 103.9 FM and online.

=== Television ===
All major digital-only television channels are available in Wauchope. The networks and the channels they broadcast are listed as follows:

- Seven (formerly Prime7 and Prime Television), 7two, 7mate, 7Bravo, 7flix. Seven Network owned and operated station channels.
- Nine (NBN), 9Go!, 9Gem and 9Life. Nine Network affiliated channels – owned by WIN Corporation.
- 10, 10 Drama, 10 Comedy and Nickelodeon. Network 10 owned and operated station channels.
- ABC, ABC Family, ABC Kids, ABC Entertains and ABC News, part of the Australian Broadcasting Corporation.
- SBS, SBS2, SBS World Movies, SBS WorldWatch, SBS Food and NITV, part of the Special Broadcasting Service.

Of the three main commercial networks:

- The Seven Network airs a half-hour local Seven News bulletin for the North Coast at 6 pm each weeknight. It is broadcast from studios in Canberra with reporters based at a local newsroom in the town.
- WIN Television airs NBN News, a regional half-hour long program including opt-outs for the Mid North Coast, every weeknight at 5:30pm. It is broadcast from studios in Newcastle with reporters based at a local newsroom in the town.
- Network 10 airs short local news updates throughout the day, broadcast from its Hobart studios.

=== Newspapers ===
The town is served by these local newspapers:

- Heart of the Hastings
- The Port Macquarie Express
- Port Macquarie Independent
- Port Macquarie News

== People from Wauchope ==
- Bill Bain – Emmy award-winning TV director
- Di Cook – Statistician
- Iva Davies – Musician, Icehouse
- Reginald Elliott Davies – Former independent member of Western Australian Parliament and Member of Special Air Service Regiment
- Rhali Dobson – W-League footballer for Melbourne City
- Angus Gill – Musician
- Phil Jamieson – Musician, Grinspoon
- Allison Langdon – television presenter and journalist
- Mark Laurie – former rugby league footballer
- Robert Laurie – former rugby league footballer
- Ian Schubert – former rugby league footballer and current NRL Salary Cap auditor.
- Andrew Stoner – former New South Wales National Party leader, Member for Oxley
- Rex Terp – former rugby league footballer

== Sister cities ==
The following city has been identified as a sister city of Wauchope by Sister Cities International:

- Canisteo, New York, United States
