= Rex Terp =

Australian rugby league footballer

Personal information
- Born: 13 March 1970 (age 55); Wauchope, New South Wales, Australia

Playing information
- Position: Centre, Wing
Club
Years	Team	Pld	T	G	FG	P
1991–94	St. George Dragons	36	14	0	0	56
1995	Illawarra Steelers	3	1	0	0	4
	Total	39	15	0	0	60

Rex Terp (born 13 March 1970) is an Australian former professional rugby league footballer who played for St. George and Illawarra Steelers. He played his football in the backline, as a centre and winger.

== Playing career ==
Terp, who comes from the New South Wales town of Wauchope, spent a season in England playing for Leeds in 1989/90, before embarking on a career in the NSWRL.

From 1991 to 1994 he played first-grade for the St. George Dragons and was on the bench for the club's 1992 and 1993 grand final losses to Brisbane.

He played for Illawarra in the 1995 ARL season, before suffering a knee injury which restricted him to three first-grade appearances.

During his time in the NSWRL/ARL he continued to work as a postman, the job he had held in Wauchope.
