= Daryl Harrison =

Canadian politician

The Honourable Daryl Harrison ECS MLA

Member of the Saskatchewan Legislative Assembly for Cannington
- Incumbent
- Assumed office October 26, 2020
- Preceded by: Dan D'Autremont

Personal details
- Party: Saskatchewan Party

Daryl Harrison is a Canadian politician, who has served in the Legislative Assembly of Saskatchewan since 2020, representing the electoral district of Cannington as a member of the Saskatchewan Party. He was most recently re-elected in the 2024 Saskatchewan general election. Prior to his election, Harrison worked in the oil industry for over 30 years, served as a councillor in his local municipality, volunteered as a firefighter and cattle rancher, and served as a school division trustee for Souris-Moose Mountain and South East Cornerstone School Divisions.

Harrison was appointed to Executive Council of Saskatchewan as Minister of Agriculture on November 7, 2024.

== Election results ==
2020 Cannington General Election Results
Name	Party	Total Votes	Percentage
Daryl Harrison	SP	5,781	73.8%
Wes Smith	BUF	1,239	15.8%
Dianne Twietmeyer	NDP	680	8.7%
Jaina Forrest	GRN	136	1.7%

2024 Cannington General Election Results
Name	Party	Total Votes	Percentage
Daryl Harrison	SP	6,034	73.7%
Dianne Twietmeyer	NDP	1,058	12.9%
Michelle Krieger	BUF	540	6.6%
Barbara Helfrick	SUP	420	5.1%
Natalie Clysdale	GRN	136	1.7%

== Cabinet Positions ==
Saskatchewan provincial government of Scott Moe
Cabinet post (1)
Predecessor	Office	Successor
Dave Marit	Minister of Agriculture; November 7, 2024–	Incumbent
