= Wauchope, Saskatchewan =

Community in Saskatchewan, Canada

Wauchope
- Unincorporated community
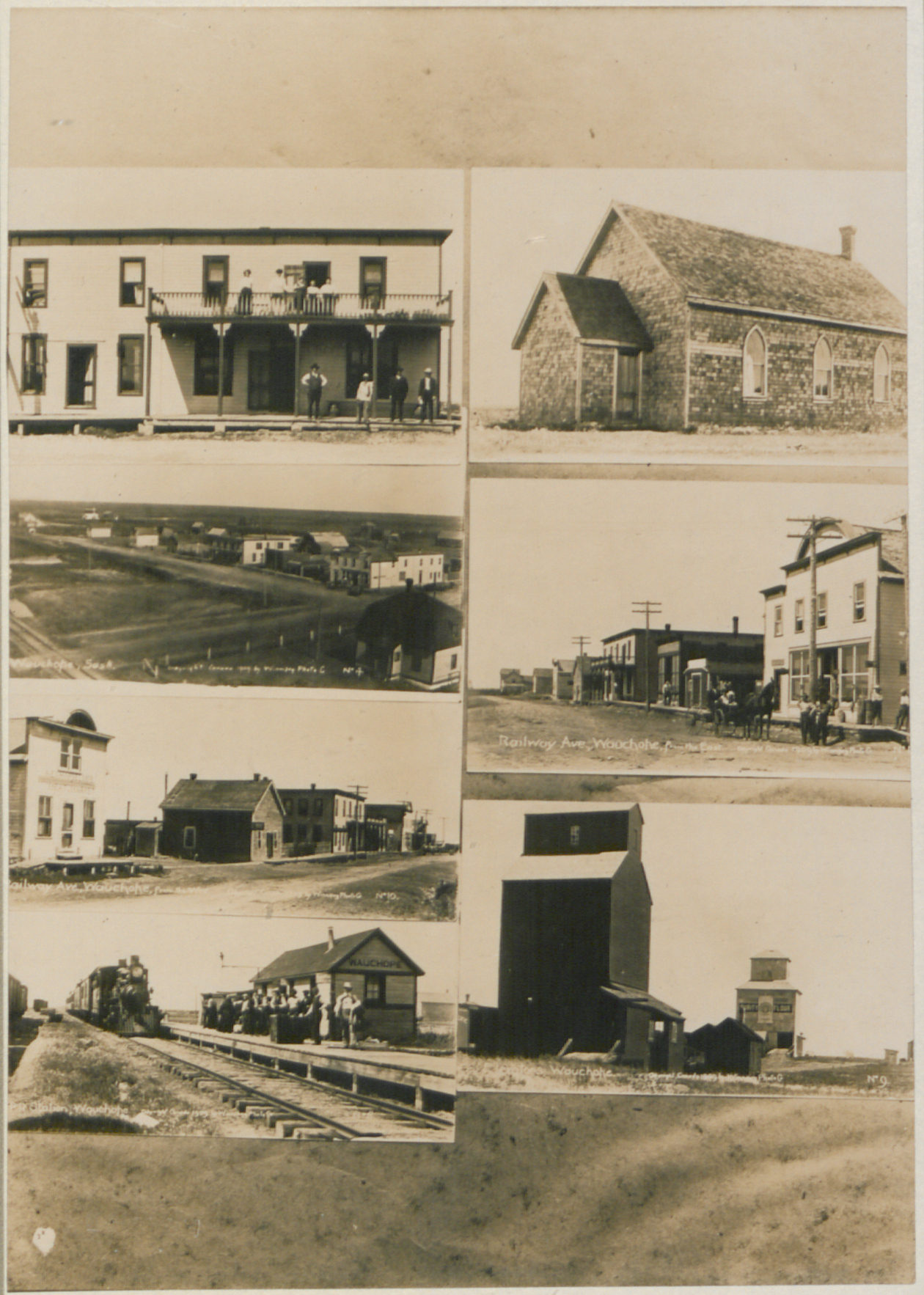
- Views of Wauchope, 1909.

- Location within Saskatchewan Location within Canada
- Coordinates: 49°36′00″N 101°54′02″W
- Country: Canada
- Province: Saskatchewan
- Region: Southeast
- Census division: 1
- Rural Municipality: Antler No. 61

Government
  - Type: Municipal
  - Governing body: Rural Municipality of Antler
  - MP: Robert Kitchen
  - MLA: Dan D'Autremont

Population (2010)
  - Total: 3
- Time zone: CST
- Postal code: S0C 2P0
- Area code: 306
- Highways: Highway 13

Wauchope (pronounced "walk-up") is an unincorporated community in the southeast corner of the Canadian province of Saskatchewan. It is located between the towns of Manor and Redvers, and is situated on the Highway 13. Once a thriving French language settlement in the early 20th century, the town used to have a Catholic Residential School (1917–64), a saloon, a general store, a motor repair shop, and other businesses. The town is in the Rural Municipality of Antler No. 61.

Today the community is home to approximately five families. Still standing is the Catholic Church and rectory, with a large Catholic cemetery located beside the church. Regular church services are no longer offered but the community maintains the church and it is used for special occasions. A local baseball diamond is also maintained. Also present is a working grain elevator.

It is believed that most of the town residents dispersed after the local well went dry but this has yet to be confirmed. Wauchope is now a semi-ghost town.

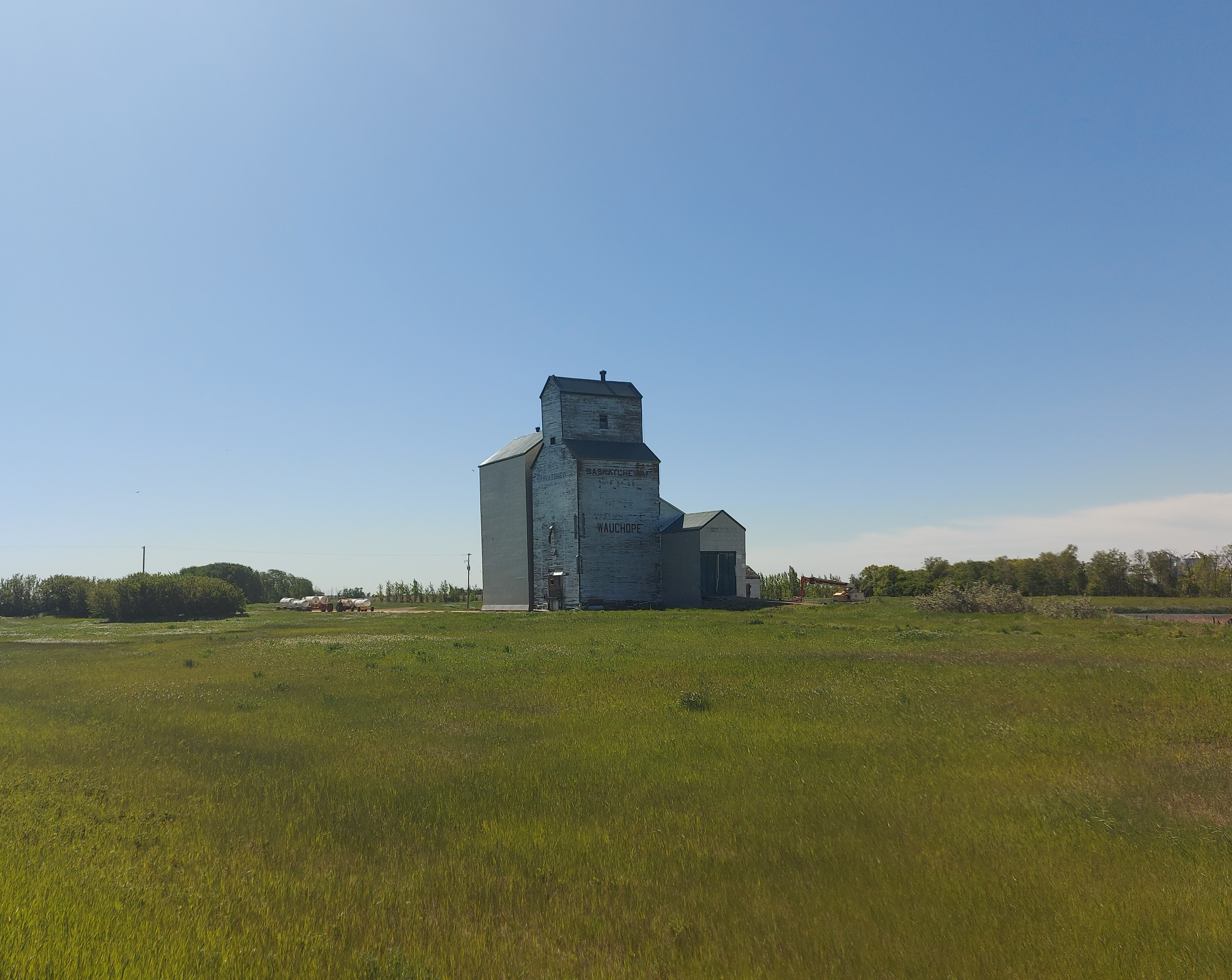
Grain elevator in Wauchope

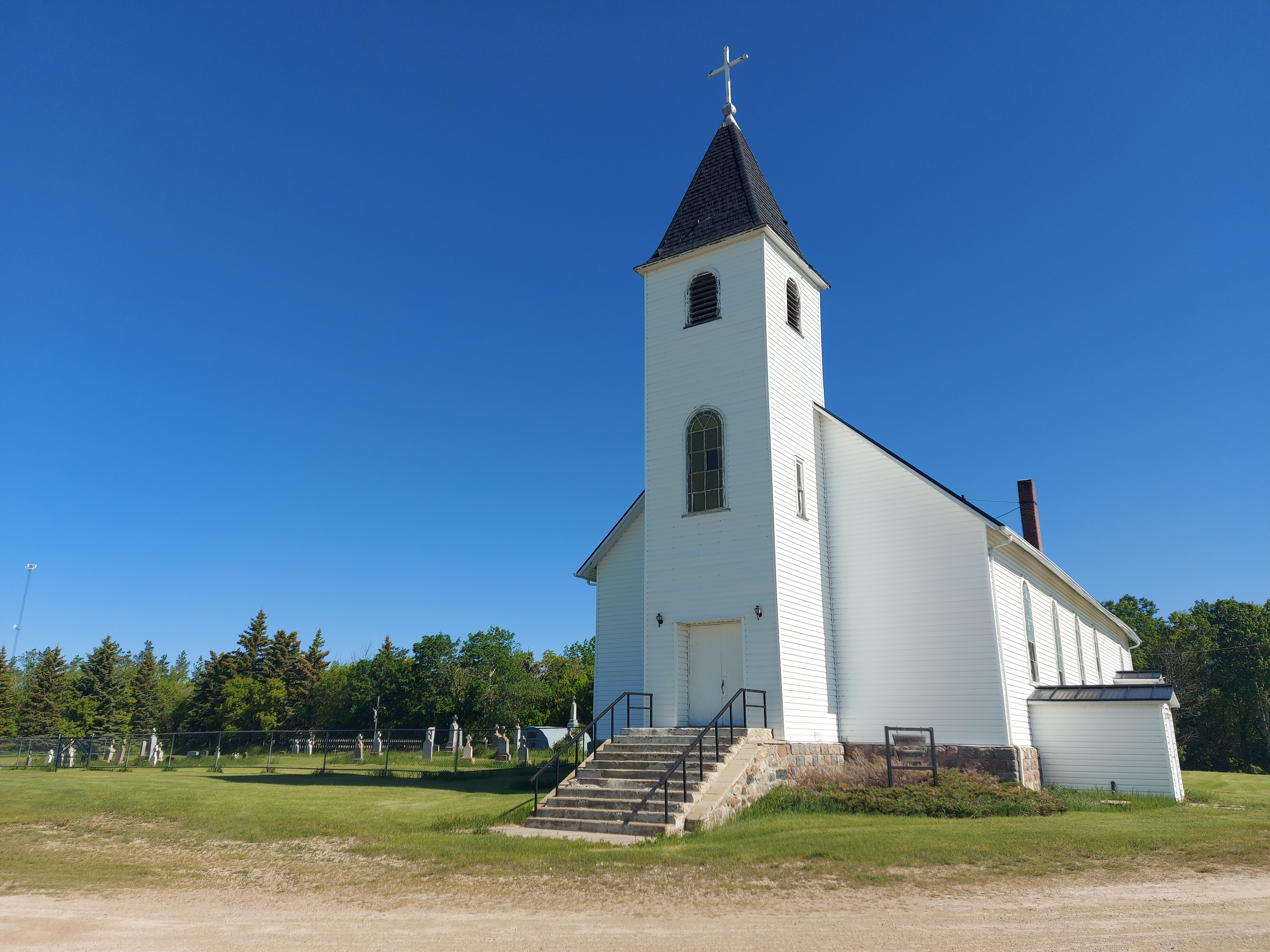
Church in Wauchope

== See also ==
- List of communities in Saskatchewan
- Block settlement
