= Robert Laurie (rugby league) =

Australian rugby league footballer (1956–2022)

Personal information
- Born: 14 January 1956 Wauchope, New South Wales, Australia
- Died: 4 June 2022 (aged 66)

Playing information
- Position: Five-eighth
Club
Years	Team	Pld	T	G	FG	P
1976–77	Easts (Sydney)	25	6	0	0	15
1978–80	South Sydney	64	16	1	0	50
1981–82	Easts (Sydney)	33	6	0	0	18
	Total	122	28	1	0	83
Representative
Years	Team	Pld	T	G	FG	P
1981	City NSW	1	0	0	0	0
1981	New South Wales	1	0	0	0	0
1983	Country NSW	1	0	0	0	0
- Relatives: Mark Laurie (brother)

Robert "Rocky" Laurie (14 January 1956 – 4 June 2022) was an Australian rugby league footballer. He played for the Eastern Suburbs Roosters and the South Sydney Rabbitohs in the New South Wales Rugby League premiership.

Laurie, along with Ian Schubert, both from the rural New South Wales (NSW) township of Wauchope, came to the Roosters in NSWRFL season 1975, although Laurie did not make his first grade debut till the following season. During the 1976 NSWRFL season, he played in the forwards, helping Eastern Suburbs to victory in their unofficial 1976 World Club Challenge match against British champions St. Helens in Sydney. However, his move to the South Sydney Rabbitohs proved a master stroke, with Laurie making the five-eighth position his own in the red and green. Laurie played his best football at Souths, carving up the opposition and setting up spectacular tries for players such as dynamic winger Terry Fahey. Laurie was awarded the 1980 Dally M Medal, the only South Sydney player to date to win the coveted award. Laurie played for Easts in their win at the final of the 1981 Craven Mild Cup.

In 1983, Laurie returned to Wauchope and captained a NSW Country representative side in a match against New Zealand's South Island. Laurie starred in the match, scoring 3 tries.

During the 1988 Great Britain Lions tour, Laurie captained a Northern Division side to victory over the visitors.

Rocky's younger brother, Mark Laurie, was a three-time premiership winner with the Parramatta club.
