= Bago Bluff National Park =

National park in New South Wales, Australia

- IUCN category II (national park)
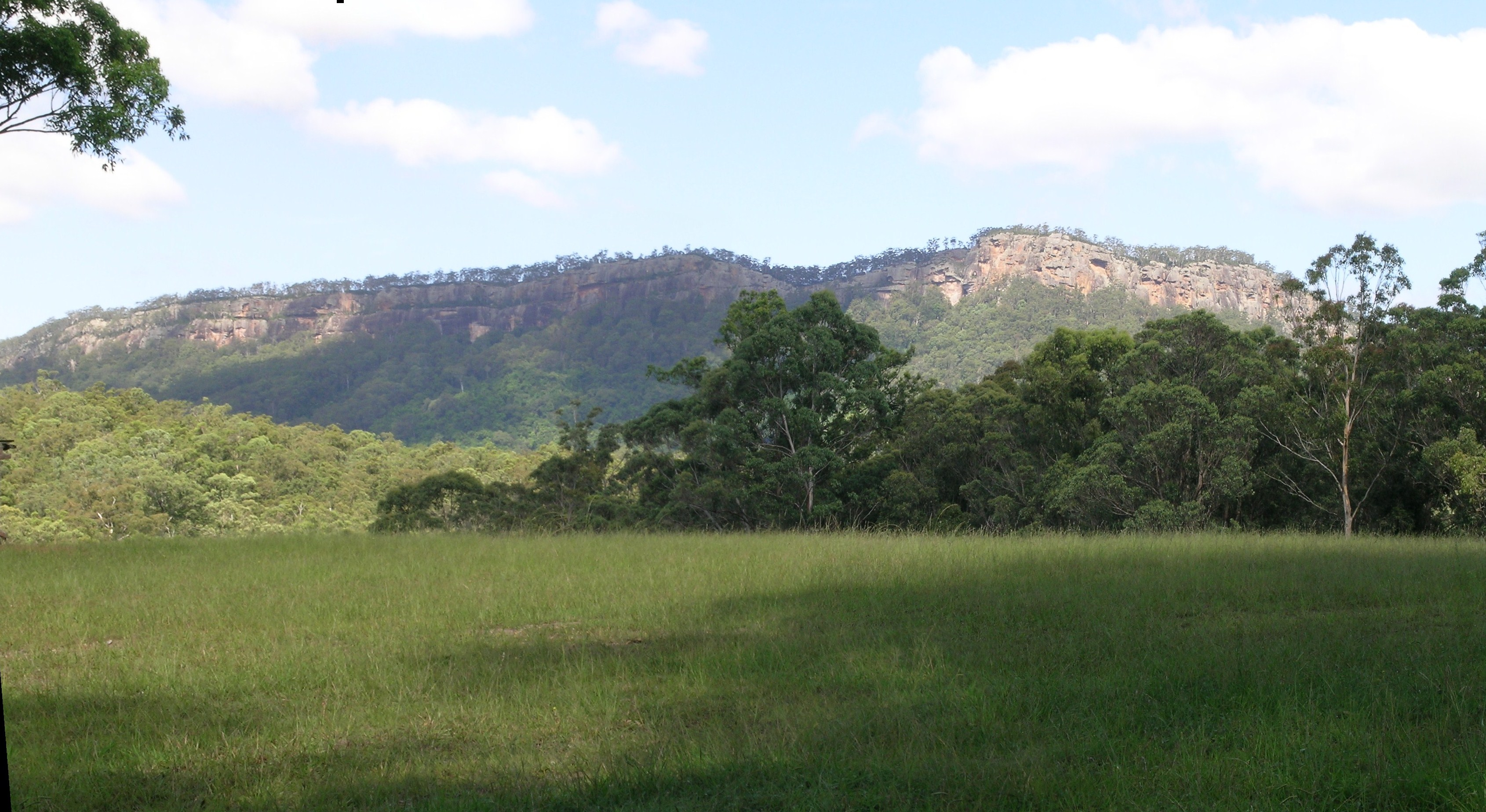
- Bago Bluff

- Location within New South Wales
- Location: New South Wales
- Nearest city: Wauchope
- Coordinates: 31°31′56″S 152°37′44″E
- Area: 40.23 km^{2} (15.53 sq mi)
- Established: January 1999
- Governing body: National Parks and Wildlife Service (New South Wales)
- Website: http://www.environment.nsw.gov.au/NationalParks/parkHome.aspx?id=N0114

Bago Bluff is a national park in New South Wales, Australia, approximately 410 km northeast of Sydney. It is situated south west of Wauchope and includes parts of the former Broken Bago State Forest and a part of Lorne State Forest. The Bago Bluff National Park also includes in the northern section the old Bago Bluff Flora Reserve and Six B Flora Reserve.

Bago Bluff offers splendid views of the Hastings Valley from the top of the bluff which can be accessed via several forest roads from the south, including Bago Road. The park's northern boundary is on southern side of the Oxley Highway where there are two badly washed 4WD tracks into the park.

Quarries in the park have previously yielded leaf and shell fossils.

Birds that may be spotted in the park include: Australian magpies (Gymnorhina tibicen), golden whistlers (Pachycephala pectoralis), green winged pigeons, grey fantails (Rhipidura), kookaburras (genus Dacelo), large-billed scrubwrens (Sericornis magnirostris), spotted pardalotes (Pardalotus punctatus), pied currawongs (Strepera graculina), striated thornbills (Acanthiza lineata) and white-browed scrubwrens (Sericornis frontalis).

Lantana has become a problem in the park where it is almost covering some of the tracks.

== See also ==
- Protected areas of New South Wales
