= Eric Berntson =

Canadian politician (1941–2018)

The Honourable Eric Berntson

Canadian Senator from Saskatchewan
- In office September 27, 1990 – February 27, 2001
- Appointed by: Brian Mulroney

Leader of the Opposition in Saskatchewan
- In office 1979–1982
- Preceded by: Dick Collver
- Succeeded by: Allan Blakeney

Member of the Saskatchewan Legislative Assembly for Souris-Cannington
- In office 1975–1990
- Succeeded by: Dan D'Autremont

Personal details
- Born: Eric Arthur Berntson; May 16, 1941 Oxbow, Saskatchewan, Canada
- Died: September 23, 2018 (aged 77) Ottawa, Ontario, Canada
- Party: Conservative

Eric Arthur Berntson (May 16, 1941 – September 23, 2018) was a Canadian politician. He represented the riding of Souris-Cannington in the Legislative Assembly of Saskatchewan from 1975 until 1990. Berntson was Leader of the Opposition in Saskatchewan from 1979 until 1982. He also served in the Senate of Canada from 1990 until 2001.

== Political career ==
=== Provincial politics ===
Berntson was first elected to the Legislative Assembly of Saskatchewan as a member of the Progressive Conservatives for the district of Souris-Cannington in the 1975 Saskatchewan general election. He served as Leader of the Opposition from 1979 to 1982 as newly elected party leader Grant Devine did not have a seat in the legislature.

He served in the Saskatchewan legislature until 1990 and was Deputy Premier in the Devine government. Berntson was widely regarded to be one of the most powerful members of the Devine government, arguably exercising more influence than the premier himself.

In 1999, Berntson was convicted of illegally diverting government allowances between 1987 and 1991 when he was Saskatchewan's deputy premier. He was sentenced to one year in prison.

=== Canadian Senate ===
On September 27, 1990, Governor General Ray Hnatyshyn, acting on the advice of Prime Minister Brian Mulroney, appointed Berntson to the Senate of Canada. Berntson was appointed thanks to Mulroney's exercise of the never before used expansion clause that allows two extra members per regional division after all the normal Senate seats are occupied.

He served as Deputy Leader of the Opposition in the Senate from 1994 until 1997, when he was charged with fraud.

After the Supreme Court of Canada dismissed his attempt to overturn his fraud conviction, Berntson resigned from the Senate on February 27, 2001.

Berntson also appeared on the 1991 tape that showed future Conservative MP Tom Lukiwski making homophobic slurs and future SaskParty premier Brad Wall mocking then Saskatchewan NDP leader Roy Romanow in a Ukrainian accent which was revealed to the public on March 31, 2008.

Berntson died in Ottawa on September 23, 2018.
