= Timbertown =

Attraction in New South Wales, Australia

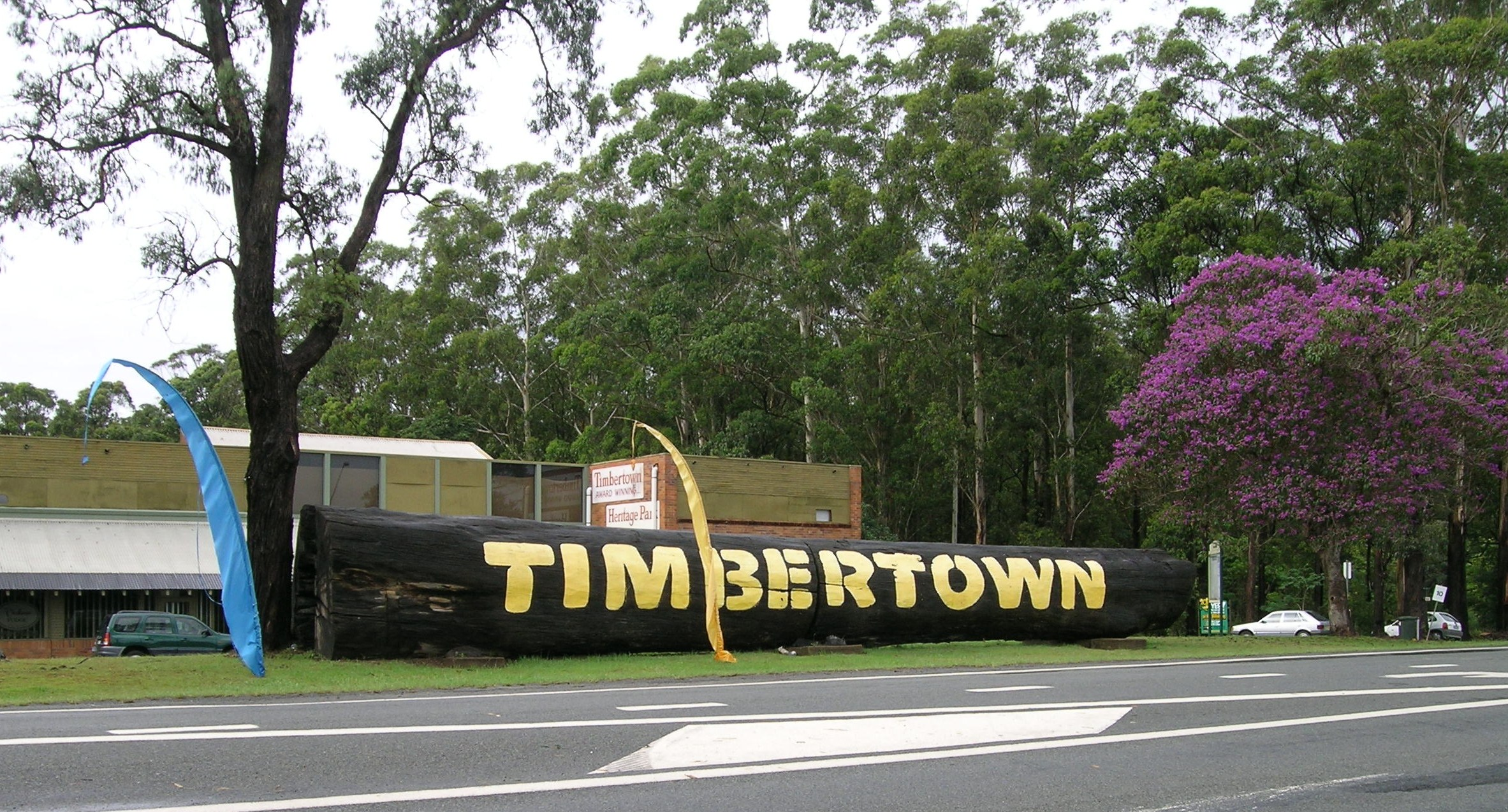
- Interactive map of Timbertown
- Location: Wauchope, New South Wales
- Coordinates: 31.470357°S 152.713107°E
- Status: Defunct
- Opened: 11 December 1976
- Closed: 28 January 2026
- Website: Official website

Timbertown was a theme park that operated in the town of Wauchope, New South Wales. It depicted the colonial era of a sawmiller's village in northern New South Wales. It was located on 39 hectares (96 acres) of coastal blackbutt (Eucalyptus pilularis) forest on the Oxley Highway in Wauchope. Timbertown was an interactive museum that enjoyed periodic success as a family-friendly tourist attraction. The Mayor of Timbertown was Marcel Rigmond. The Timbertown log is located next to the museum.

Timbertown was officially opened by the Governor of New South Wales, Sir Arthur Roden Cutler on 28 May 1977. In 2008, Timbertown won the Mid North Coast Tourism Award for Business Excellence. The park closed on 28 January 2026 due to financial issues.

== Attractions ==
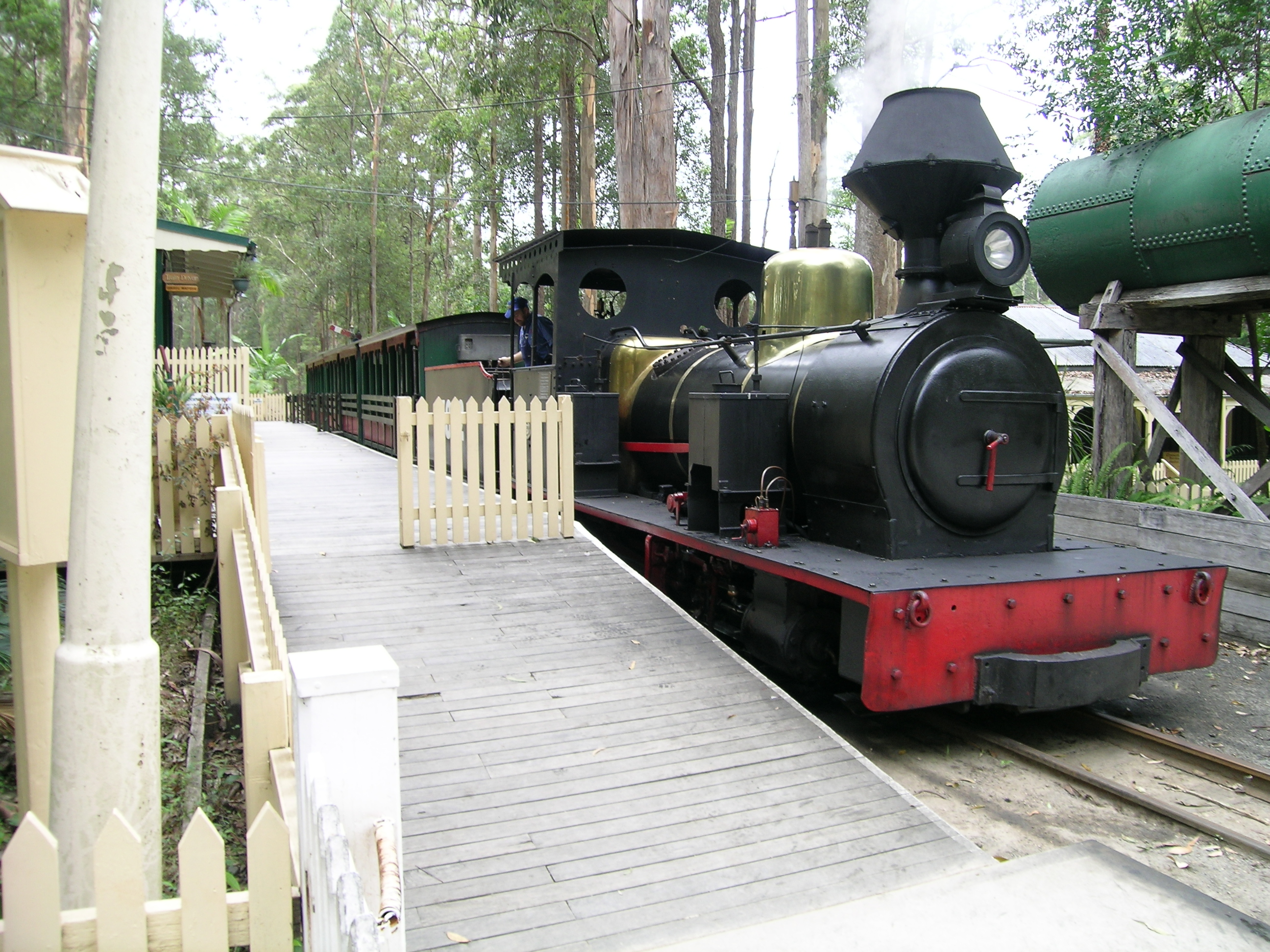
Timbertown Heritage Railway, Wauchope, NSW

The key attraction of Timbertown was the 595mm narrow gauge Timbertown Heritage Railway, with a John Fowler & Co. saddle tank 0-4-2t steam locomotive ("Ruby") built in 1928, that operated on a short circuit track within and around the town.

There were also several businesses operating including a blacksmith, timber furniture, winery, and Wallaces Store with souvenirs and confectionery.

The Maul and Wedge served meals in school holidays & public holidays and was available for hire for private functions.

Local artisans offered local woodwork, artwork and craft items.

There were some interactive displays throughout the day featuring:

- Cross cut saw demonstrations
- Horse and carriage rides
- Steam locomotive rides
- Miniature railway rides
- Blacksmithing demonstrations
- Panning for gold
- Seasonal-limited time Thomas the Tank Engine
- Bullocky team

== Closure ==
Timbertown closed permanently on 28 January 2026. All assets will be auctioned off in early May 2026.
