= Cannington (electoral district) =

Provincial electoral district in Saskatchewan, Canada

Coordinates: 49°35′N 102°40′W

Saskatchewan electoral district

Provincial electoral district
- Legislature: Legislative Assembly of Saskatchewan
MLA
Daryl Harrison
Saskatchewan
- District created: 1974
- First contested: 1975 as "Souris-Cannington"
- Last contested: 2020

Demographics
- Electors: 9,876
- Census division: Division 1

Cannington is a provincial electoral district for the Legislative Assembly of Saskatchewan, Canada. Located in the extreme southeast corner of the province, this constituency was redrawn to include the former district of Souris for the 18th Saskatchewan general election in 1975.

The original Cannington constituency, one of 25 created for the 1st Saskatchewan general election in 1905, was named after the Cannington Manor settlement located in the region.

Currently the safest seat for the Saskatchewan Party, it is arguably one of the most conservative ridings in the province — having never elected a member of the CCF or NDP.

The district has an economy based on grain and mixed farming. Oil production is scattered throughout the riding and oil service companies provide a great deal of off-farm employment. An integrated health facility in Wawota offers acute, long-term and palliative care.

The constituency's major communities include Carlyle, Oxbow, and Carnduff with populations of 2,129, 1,260 and 1,017 respectively. Smaller centres in the district include the towns of Redvers, Lampman, Stoughton, Wawota, Arcola and Alameda; and the villages of Manor, Gainsborough, Maryfield, Carievale and Kenosee Lake.

== Members of the Legislative Assembly ==
Legislature	Years	Member	Party
Souris-Cannington
18th	1975–1978	Eric Berntson	Progressive Conservative
19th	1978–1982	Eric Berntson	Progressive Conservative
20th	1982–1986	Eric Berntson	Progressive Conservative
21st	1986–1991	Eric Berntson	Progressive Conservative
22nd	1991–1995	Dan D'Autremont	Progressive Conservative
Cannington
23rd	1995–1997	Dan D'Autremont	Progressive Conservative
23rd	1997–1999	Dan D'Autremont	Saskatchewan Party
24th	1999–2003	Dan D'Autremont	Saskatchewan Party
25th	2003–2007	Dan D'Autremont	Saskatchewan Party
26th	2007–2011	Dan D'Autremont	Saskatchewan Party
27th	2011–2016	Dan D'Autremont	Saskatchewan Party
28th	2016–2020	Dan D'Autremont	Saskatchewan Party
29th	2020–2024	Daryl Harrison	Saskatchewan Party
30th	2024-present	Daryl Harrison	Saskatchewan Party

== Election results ==
2024 Saskatchewan general election
Party	Candidate	Votes	%	±%
Saskatchewan	Daryl Harrison	6,157	73.68	-0.09
New Democratic	Dianne Twietmeyer	1,123	13.44	+4.76
Buffalo	Michelle Krieger	549	6.57	-9.24
Saskatchewan United	Barbara Helfrick	424	5.07	-
Green	Natalie Lund-Clysdale	103	1.23	-0.51
Total valid votes		8,356		
Total rejected ballots				
Turnout				
Eligible voters				
Saskatchewan hold		Swing		–
Source: Elections Saskatchewan

2020 Saskatchewan general election
Party	Candidate	Votes	%	±%
Saskatchewan	Daryl Harrison	5,781	73.77	-10.69
Buffalo	Wes Smith	1,239	15.81	–
New Democratic	Dianne Twietmeyer	680	8.68	-0.15
Green	Jaina Forrest	136	1.74	±0.00
Total valid votes		7,836	99.71	
Total rejected ballots		23	0.29	+0.13
Turnout		7,859	79.58	+17.14
Eligible voters		9,876		
Saskatchewan hold		Swing		–
Source: Elections Saskatchewan

2016 Saskatchewan general election
Party	Candidate	Votes	%	±%
Saskatchewan	Dan D'Autremont	6,444	84.46	+8.81
New Democratic	Nathaniel Cole	674	8.83	-5.99
Progressive Conservative	Kurt Schmidt	245	3.21	-4.16
Liberal	Patrick Dennie	133	1.74	-
Green	Tierra Lemieux	133	1.74	-0.42
Total valid votes		7,629	99.84	
Total rejected ballots		12	0.16	–
Turnout		7,641	62.44	–
Eligible voters		12,238		
Source: Elections Saskatchewan

2011 Saskatchewan general election: Cannington
Party	Candidate	Votes	%	±%
Saskatchewan	Dan D'Autremont	4,691	75.65	-2.10
NDP	Todd Gervais	919	14.82	-1.77
Prog. Conservative	Chris Brown	457	7.37	-
Green	Daniel Johnson	134	2.16	–
Total		6,201	100.00	

2007 Saskatchewan general election: Cannington
Party	Candidate	Votes	%	±%
Saskatchewan	Dan D'Autremont	5,614	77.75	+6.87
NDP	Henry Friesen	1,198	16.59	-4.9
Liberal	Karen Spelay	409	5.66	-1.89
Total		7,221	100.00	

2003 Saskatchewan general election: Cannington
Party	Candidate	Votes	%	±%
Saskatchewan	Dan D'Autremont	5,156	70.88	-4.00
NDP	Henry Friesen	1,569	21.57	+6.99
Liberal	John Atwell	549	7.55	-2.99
Total		7,274	100.00	

1999 Saskatchewan general election: Cannington
Party	Candidate	Votes	%	±%
Saskatchewan	Dan D'Autremont	5,671	74.88	–
NDP	Glen Lawson	1,104	14.58	-9.40
Liberal	Joanne Johnston	798	10.54	-19.85
Total		7,573	100.00	

1995 Saskatchewan general election: Cannington
Party	Candidate	Votes	%	±%
Progressive Conservative	Dan D'Autremont	3,542	45.63	+1.20
Liberal	Don Lees	2,359	30.39	+3.33
NDP	Gary Lake	1,861	23.98	-4.53
Total		7,762	100.00	

=== Souris-Cannington ===
1991 Saskatchewan general election: Souris-Cannington
Party	Candidate	Votes	%	±%
Progressive Conservative	Dan D'Autremont	2,980	44.43	-23.27
NDP	Ross Arthur	1,912	28.51	+6.21
Liberal	Don Lees	1,815	27.06	+17.06
Total		6,707	100.00	

1986 Saskatchewan general election: Souris-Cannington
Party	Candidate	Votes	%	±%
Progressive Conservative	Eric Berntson	4,642	67.70	+11.25
NDP	Charlotte Rasmussen	1,529	22.30	-0.30
Liberal	William H. Ireland	686	10.00	+3.97
Total		6,857	100.00	

1982 Saskatchewan general election: Souris-Cannington
Party	Candidate	Votes	%	±%
Progressive Conservative	Eric Berntson	4,093	56.45	+2.48
NDP	Dean Fraser	1,639	22.60	-6.54
Western Canada Concept	Dale Nolin	1,082	14.92	–
Liberal	William J. Owens	437	6.03	-10.86
Total		7,251	100.00	

1978 Saskatchewan general election: Souris-Cannington
Party	Candidate	Votes	%	±%
Progressive Conservative	Eric Berntson	3,739	53.97	+9.58
NDP	Dean Fraser	2,019	29.14	+8.00
Liberal	Gerard Belisle	1,170	16.89	-17.58
Total		6,928	100.00	

1975 Saskatchewan general election: Souris-Cannington
Party	Candidate	Votes	%	±%
Progressive Conservative	Eric Berntson	3,212	44.39	–
Liberal	Thomas M. Weatherald	2,494	34.47	–
NDP	James T. Eaton	1,530	21.14	–
Total		7,236	100.00	

== See also ==
- List of Saskatchewan provincial electoral districts
- List of Saskatchewan general elections
- Canadian provincial electoral districts
- Cannington (former electoral district)
