= Robert Wauch =

Robert Andrew Wauch (1787, Great Yarmouth, Norfolk, England – 1866), Wauch emigrated to Australia in 1836, at the age of 49, and purchased land west of Port Macquarie, from the Crown. He received a £200 from the British Government which he used in the purchase of his land.

Captain Wauch's family were in the Quodquen area near Glasqow in the 1600s, a branch of the family settled at Kirknewton and called their property Easter Newtown. In 1807 Robert Wauch, the Captain's father sold the property and purchased Foxhall near Edinburgh. This property passed to Captain Robert Andrew Wauch on the death of his father in 1817.

Like his father, Wauch joined the armed services. He retired from service in the 48th Regiment of Foot in 1836 and sailed to Sydney, Australia, with his wife and three children. They settled on a 2,297-acre (9.30 km^{2}) property at King Creek in the Hastings Valley. In the next four years, he added 1,168 acres (4.73 km^{2}) to his property which he called Wauchope, a play on Wauch's Hope, hope of a better future. >

Robert Wauch died in Kempsey, New South Wales in 1866. When the post office opened in a nearby settlement in 1881, it was named Wauchope, although the Government Gazette misprinted the name Wanghope, an error that was not corrected until 1889.
