= Dan D'Autremont =

Canadian politician

The Honourable Dan D'Autremont ECS

25th Speaker of the Legislative Assembly of Saskatchewan
- In office December 5, 2011 – May 17, 2016
- Preceded by: Don Toth
- Succeeded by: Corey Tochor

Member of the Legislative Assembly of Saskatchewan for Cannington Souris-Cannington (1991-1995)
- In office October 21, 1991 – September 29, 2020
- Preceded by: Eric Berntson
- Succeeded by: Daryl Harrison

Personal details
- Born: December 28, 1950 (age 75) Redvers, Saskatchewan
- Party: Progressive Conservative → Saskatchewan Party
- Education: University of Calgary
- Occupation: Farmer

Daniel H. D'Autremont (born December 28, 1950) is a Canadian provincial politician. He was a member of the Legislative Assembly of Saskatchewan, representing the constituency of Cannington and its predecessor Souris-Cannington from 1991 to 2020. He served as Speaker of the Legislative Assembly from 2011 to 2016.

He was born in Redvers, Saskatchewan, the son of Hugh and Violet D'Autremont, and grew up on the family farm about two miles east of Alida. D'Autremont studied engineering at the University of Calgary. He worked in the oil industry for a number of years before taking up farming in the Redvers area in 1977.

D'Autremont was first elected in 1991 as a member of the Progressive Conservative Party, and was one of the eight founding members of the Saskatchewan Party in 1997. With the retirement of Don Toth in 2016, D'Autremont became the longest serving member in the Saskatchewan Legislative Assembly.

D'Autremont was elected as Speaker of the Legislative Assembly of Saskatchewan on December 5, 2011, as the first order of business following the November 7, 2011 general election. He challenged Don Toth, the Speaker during the Saskatchewan Party's first term. In a secret ballot of the members of the Assembly, D'Autremont defeated Toth.

Following the 2016 general election, D'Autremont again stood for election as Speaker, but was defeated on the second ballot by Corey Tochor.

D'Autremont announced that he would not run for re-election in 2020, but would remain a MLA until then.

== Election results ==
2007 Saskatchewan general election: Cannington
Party	Candidate	Votes	%	±%
Saskatchewan	Dan D'Autremont	5,614	77.75%	+6.87
NDP	Henry Friesen	1,198	16.59%	-4.98
Liberal	Karen Spelay	409	5.66%	-1.89
Total		7,221	100.00%	

2003 Saskatchewan general election: Cannington
Party	Candidate	Votes	%	±%
Saskatchewan	Dan D'Autremont	5,156	70.88%	-4.00
NDP	Henry Friesen	1,569	21.57%	+6.99
Liberal	John Atwell	549	7.55%	-2.99
Total		7,274	100.00%	

1999 Saskatchewan general election: Cannington
Party	Candidate	Votes	%	±%
Saskatchewan	Dan D'Autremont	5,671	74.88%	
NDP	Glen Lawson	1,104	14.58%	-9.40
Liberal	Joanne Johnston	798	10.54%	-19.85
Total		7,573	100.00%	

1995 Saskatchewan general election: Cannington
Party	Candidate	Votes	%	±%
Progressive Conservative	Dan D'Autremont	3,542	45.63%	+1.20
Liberal	Don Lees	2,359	30.39%	+3.33
NDP	Gary Lake	1,861	23.98%	-4.53
Total		7,762	100.00%	
