= Redvers, Saskatchewan =

Town in Saskatchewan, Canada

Redvers
- Town
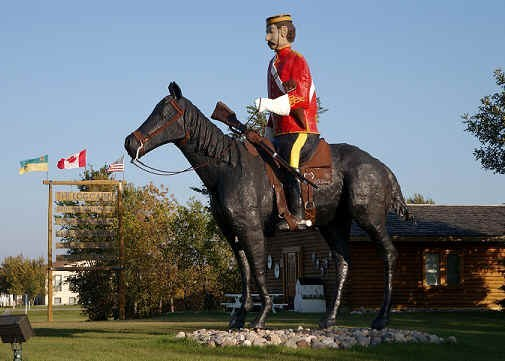
- Mounted-police statue beside Highway 13

- Location in Saskatchewan Location in Canada
- Coordinates: 49.571660°N 101.69915°W
- Country: Canada
- Province: Saskatchewan
- Census division: Division No. 1
- Provincial constituency: Cannington
- Federal riding: Souris—Moose Mountain
- Rural municipality: Antler No. 61
- Post office established: 1902
- Incorporated: 1904

Government
  - Type: Mayor–council
  - Mayor: Bradley Bulbuck
  - Administrator: Tricia Pickard

Area
  - Land: 2.90 km^{2} (1.12 sq mi)
- Elevation: 591 m (1,939 ft)

Population (2021)
  - Total: 1,008
  - Density: 347.6/km^{2} (900/sq mi)
- Time zone: UTC−6 (CST)
- Postal code: S0C 2H0
- Area code: 306
- Website: redvers.ca

Redvers is a town in southeastern Saskatchewan, Canada. It is surrounded by, but administratively separate from, the Rural Municipality of Antler No. 61. Redvers is at the junction of Highway 8 and Highway 13, approximately 19 kilometres (12 mi) west of the Manitoba boundary and 67 kilometres (42 mi) north of the Canada–United States border. The population was 1,008 in the 2021 Canadian census.

Established during the settlement of the Canadian Prairies, Redvers was named for British general Redvers Buller. Its post office opened in 1902 and the community was incorporated in 1904. The town developed as a commercial and service centre for a surrounding agricultural district; agriculture, oilfield activity, retail and professional services form parts of its economy. Highway 13 is promoted as the Red Coat Trail, commemorating the North-West Mounted Police's 1874 March West. A mounted-police statue, visitor information cabin and campground stand beside the highway on the western edge of town.

== Geography ==
Redvers is in the southeastern corner of Saskatchewan. Highways 8 and 13 connect the town with communities on both sides of the Saskatchewan–Manitoba boundary, and the Canada–United States boundary is to the south. The town occupies 2.90 km^{2} (1.12 sq mi) of land.

=== Climate ===
Redvers has cold winters and warm summers. At the Environment and Climate Change Canada station near the town, the 1981–2010 daily mean temperature ranged from −14.8 °C (5.4 °F) in January to 18.7 °C (65.7 °F) in July. Average annual precipitation was 443.6 millimetres (17.46 in), including 113.0 centimetres (44.5 in) of snow.

Climate data for Redvers (1981–2010 normals)
Month	Jan	Feb	Mar	Apr	May	Jun	Jul	Aug	Sep	Oct	Nov	Dec	Year
Mean daily maximum °C (°F)	−10 (14)	−7.2 (19.0)	−0.6 (30.9)	10.4 (50.7)	17.8 (64.0)	22.2 (72.0)	25.1 (77.2)	24.9 (76.8)	19.3 (66.7)	10.3 (50.5)	−0.6 (30.9)	−7.7 (18.1)	8.7 (47.7)
Daily mean °C (°F)	−14.8 (5.4)	−11.9 (10.6)	−5.4 (22.3)	4.4 (39.9)	11.1 (52.0)	16.2 (61.2)	18.7 (65.7)	18.0 (64.4)	12.5 (54.5)	4.5 (40.1)	−4.9 (23.2)	−12 (10)	3.1 (37.6)
Mean daily minimum °C (°F)	−19.5 (−3.1)	−16.6 (2.1)	−10.1 (13.8)	−1.6 (29.1)	4.5 (40.1)	10.2 (50.4)	12.4 (54.3)	11.2 (52.2)	5.8 (42.4)	−1.2 (29.8)	−9.2 (15.4)	−16.4 (2.5)	−2.6 (27.3)
Average precipitation mm (inches)	20.0 (0.79)	11.5 (0.45)	19.2 (0.76)	22.8 (0.90)	60.0 (2.36)	95.2 (3.75)	65.5 (2.58)	46.6 (1.83)	32.7 (1.29)	27.0 (1.06)	20.0 (0.79)	23.3 (0.92)	443.6 (17.46)
Average rainfall mm (inches)	0.1 (0.00)	0.0 (0.0)	3.9 (0.15)	13.3 (0.52)	53.2 (2.09)	95.2 (3.75)	65.5 (2.58)	46.6 (1.83)	32.7 (1.29)	18.2 (0.72)	1.9 (0.07)	0.1 (0.00)	330.6 (13.02)
Average snowfall cm (inches)	19.9 (7.8)	11.5 (4.5)	15.3 (6.0)	9.5 (3.7)	6.8 (2.7)	0.0 (0.0)	0.0 (0.0)	0.0 (0.0)	0.0 (0.0)	8.8 (3.5)	18.1 (7.1)	23.2 (9.1)	113.0 (44.5)
Source: Environment and Climate Change Canada

== History ==
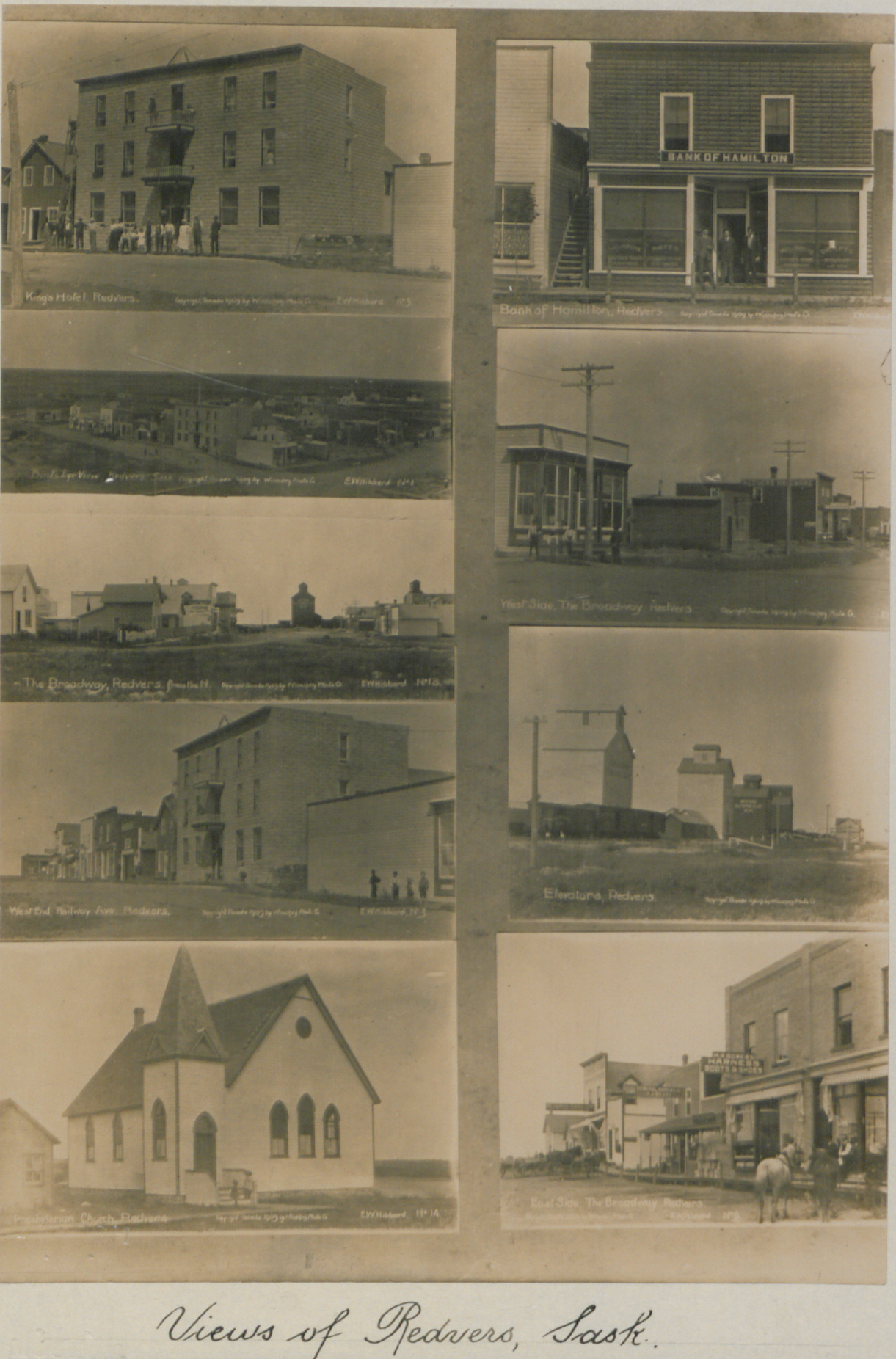
A historic view of Redvers

British and French settlers began homesteading in the Redvers district during the 1890s. Danish families arrived during the first decade of the 20th century, making the district Saskatchewan's only specifically Danish settlement area. The community took its name from Sir Redvers Buller, who commanded British forces during the Second Boer War. The post office was established in 1902, and Redvers was incorporated as a town in 1904. Several streets were named for other British military figures of the period.

Redvers also became part of a group of French-speaking settlements in southeastern Saskatchewan. The Roman Catholic parish of Notre-Dame-de-Fatima was organized in 1950. Danish settlers organized the Dannevirke Lutheran congregation in 1923.

The population reached about 200 by 1911 and changed little until after the Second World War. Redvers then grew rapidly during the 1950s and 1960s as it became a commercial centre for the surrounding district. The population stabilized from the mid-1980s into the early 2000s.

== Demographics ==
In the 2021 Census of Population conducted by Statistics Canada, Redvers had a population of 1,008 living in 443 of its 514 total private dwellings, a decrease of 3.3% from its 2016 population of 1,042. With a land area of 2.90 km^{2} (1.12 sq mi), it had a population density of 347.6/km^{2} (900.2/sq mi) in 2021. The median age was 40.0 years.

Population trend, 2006–2021
Census year	Population	Change
2006	878	—
2011	975	+11.0%
2016	1,042	+6.9%
2021	1,008	−3.3%
Sources: Statistics Canada

== Economy ==
Redvers functions as a service and trading centre for the surrounding agricultural district. Farming remains important to the regional economy, while oilfield operations and service businesses have contributed to the town's economic base. A 2016 municipal community profile identified agriculture, natural-resource activity, retail, construction and professional services among the local economic sectors. Because Redvers is close to Manitoba and lies at the junction of two provincial highways, its trading area extends beyond the immediate municipality.

The 2021 census reported 430 people in the local labour force with a classified industry. The largest reported industry groups were retail trade, health care and social assistance, resource extraction, and agriculture.

Selected industry groups, 2021
Industry group	Labour force
Retail trade	75
Health care and social assistance	55
Mining, quarrying, and oil and gas extraction	50
Agriculture, forestry, fishing and hunting	45
Wholesale trade	35
Finance and insurance	30
Statistics Canada reports counts from the long-form census in rounded increments.

The same census counted 50 self-employed workers. Among 285 employed residents with a usual place of work, 185 worked within Redvers and 80 worked elsewhere in the same census division.

== Government ==
Redvers is governed by a mayor and six councillors. The Government of Saskatchewan's municipal directory listed Bradley Bulbuck as mayor and Tricia Pickard as administrator in October 2025. The town is geographically surrounded by the Rural Municipality of Antler No. 61.

For representation in the Legislative Assembly of Saskatchewan, Redvers is in the electoral district of Cannington. Federally, it is in Souris—Moose Mountain.

== Transportation ==
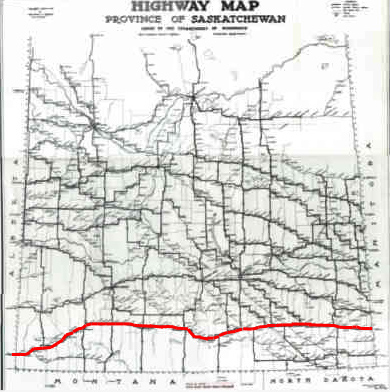
Highway 13, the Red Coat Trail, highlighted across southern Saskatchewan on a historic road map

Highway 13 runs east–west through Redvers and Highway 8 runs north–south. Highway 13 is also known as the Red Coat Trail, a route named in commemoration of the North-West Mounted Police's 1874 March West across the Prairies. The town's 2016 community profile placed Brandon, Manitoba, about 152 kilometres (94 mi) away by road and Regina about 242 kilometres (150 mi) away.

== Education and health care ==
Redvers School, operated by the South East Cornerstone Public School Division, provides instruction from kindergarten through Grade 12. The Redvers branch of the Southeast Regional Library is a public library located in the town office building.

Redvers Health Centre provides a 24-hour emergency department, laboratory and diagnostic imaging services, outpatient care, and 23 long-term-care beds, as well as one respite bed.

== Culture, recreation and tourism ==
A large statue of a mounted police officer on horseback stands beside Highway 13 at the western entrance to Redvers. Tourism Saskatchewan describes it as the world's largest statue depicting a North-West Mounted Police officer. Together, the statue and adjacent visitor facilities mark the town's association with the Red Coat Trail.

The seasonal Redvers Tourism Log Cabin operates as a visitor-information centre, gift shop and coffee stop. Its campground has non-electric and full-service sites, free internet access, a covered camp kitchen and a playground. The cabin sells locally made goods and hosts a weekly farmers' market during the summer. The facility is open from the May long weekend through the Labour Day weekend.

The town's recreation facilities include an arena, curling rink, outdoor swimming pool, ball diamonds and playgrounds. Redvers Golf and Country Club is a nine-hole grass-greens course; the club was organized in 1966 and developed largely through volunteer labour.

A community Homecoming weekend was first held around Canada Day in 2024 and returned in 2025; the program continued as Summerfest in 2026. Events have included a parade, slo-pitch tournament, ranch rodeo, trade and art shows, live music, a car show and fireworks.

== Sports ==
Redvers is represented by the Redvers Rockets in the Big Six Hockey League. The Redvers A's compete in the Saskota Baseball League.

== Notable people ==
- Dan D'Autremont, provincial politician and former Speaker of the Legislative Assembly of Saskatchewan
- Dean Kennedy, former National Hockey League defenceman
- Val Sweeting, curler and national champion
- Robert A. Wardhaugh, historian and professor at the University of Western Ontario

== See also ==
- List of communities in Saskatchewan
- List of towns in Saskatchewan
- Red Coat Trail
