= Robert Wauchope (Royal Navy officer) =

Royal Navy Admiral (1788–1862)

- Born: 1788
- Died: 1862 (aged 73–74)
- Burial place: Dacre Churchyard, Penrith, Cumberland, England
- Military career
- Allegiance: United Kingdom
- Branch: Royal Navy
- Service years: 1802–1838
- Rank: Admiral of the Blue
- Known for: Inventor of the time ball
- Conflicts: Napoleonic Wars, Attack on Mauritius (1810)

Robert Wauchope (1788–1862) was a British admiral in the Royal Navy, and the inventor of the time ball.

== Early life ==
Robert Wauchope was the fifth son of Andrew Wauchope (died 1823) of Niddrie-Marischall, Midlothian, Scotland, by Alice Baird (died 1814), daughter of William Baird of Newbyth.

He joined the Royal Navy in 1802, was commissioned in 1808, and served in the Napoleonic Wars, notably as a lieutenant in Captain Samuel Pym's disastrous attack on Mauritius in August 1810. After the destruction of his ship, the Magicienne, Wauchope set off in a cutter to Réunion, 140 miles away, to warn Commodore Josias Rowley. He was picked up by Rowley the next day, and took part in Admiral Albemarle Bertie's capture of Mauritius in December 1810. He was promoted to captain in 1814 after which he commanded HMS Eurydice. He visited Napoleon on St Helena 1816 and was stationed for the next three years at the Cape and St Helena.

He became "born again of the Holy Spirit" in 1819 and expressed his disapproval to Admiral Robert Plampin of his "living openly with a kept mistress". His religious views contributed to him spending all but four years thereafter on half pay.

== Time ball ==
It was then essential for the calculation of longitude that a ship's marine chronometer be accurate, but the astronomical calculations to ensure accuracy were such that could only conveniently be made in observatories. In 1818 Wauchope became interested in developing a method of signalling from an observatory to ships the exact time so that the chronometers on board could be rated. He advised the Admiralty of his Plan for ascertaining the rates of chronometers by signal, which described his "time ball", a large hollow metal sphere rigged on a pole and attached to a mechanism so that it might be dropped at an exact time each day. In 1829 a test was made of his device at Portsmouth on the south coast of England, where the Royal Naval Academy was situated. In 1833 time balls were constructed at Greenwich, and in 1836 at Liverpool and Edinburgh. Wauchope submitted his scheme to American and French ambassadors when they visited England. The US Naval Observatory was established in Washington, D.C. and the first American time ball went into service in 1845. In 1834 his brother-in-law, Admiral Patrick Campbell, invited him to be his flag captain. Wauchope accepted on the condition that no prostitutes were to be allowed on board the ship. His insistence on this resulted in him being summoned before Sir Thomas Hardy the First Sea Lord, who ordered him to resign his commission. Wauchope told Sir Thomas: "It is written that whoremongers shall not enter heaven" (ibid, 103), and appealed to Sir James Graham, the First Lord of the Admiralty. He was allowed to take command of HMS Thalia in June 1834 and was again stationed at the Cape where he became an intimate friend of Sir John Herschel. In 1836-7 he patrolled off West Africa to intercept slavers. His active naval career ended on his return to England in 1838.

== Retirement ==
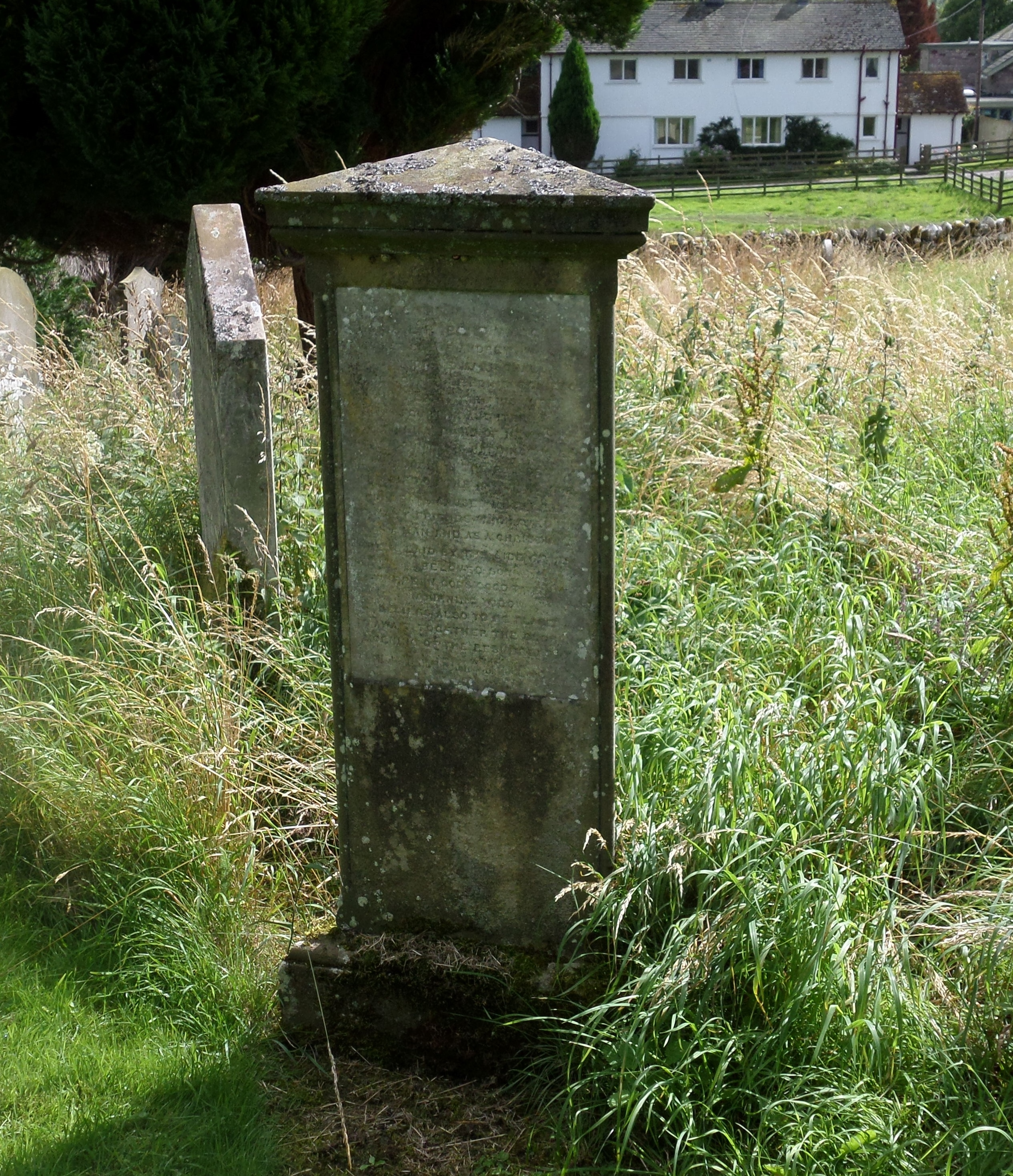
Robert Wauchope's gravestone.

He retired to Dacre Lodge in Cumberland. In 1849 he was promoted to rear admiral, in 1856 to vice admiral and in 1861, the year before his death, to Admiral of the Blue. In that year he published an anti-Darwinian pamphlet, Proofs of the Possible Cause and Recent Date of the Boulder Drift, Connecting it with the Post Tertiary Period and Noachian Deluge, and wrote his memoirs, A Short Narrative, for the instruction of his great nephew, Andrew Wauchope.

At the time of his death, time balls were in use on every inhabited continent. Although rendered obsolete on the introduction of radio time signals, operational examples survive atop the Royal Observatories at Greenwich and Cape Town, at Sydney Observatory, at Lyttelton in New Zealand, on Nelson's Monument on Calton Hill in Edinburgh, and at Deal.

He is buried in Dacre Churchyard, Penrith, Cumbria, England. (i.e. near Dacre Lodge) under an unusual tombstone that is triangular in cross section. The grave is immediately on the right as one enters the churchyard.

== Personal life ==
He married in 1822 Anne Carnegie, fourth daughter of Sir David Carnegie, bt., and settled in Easter Duddingston, Midlothian and later at Moorhouse Hall in Cumberland. Their only child died a minor in 1844.

== Sources ==
- Ian R. Bartky and Steven J. Dick, "The First Time Balls", Journal for the History of Astronomy, 12, 155–164 (1981)
- O'Byrne, William Richard (1849). "Wauchope, Robert" . A Naval Biographical Dictionary . John Murray – via Wikisource.
- William Richard O'Byrne, A Naval Biographical Dictionary (1849)
- Robert Wauchope, 'Time Signals for Chronometers' The Nautical Magazine (1836), 460–464; A short narrative of God's merciful dealings towards me (1862
- William Laird Clowes, The Royal Navy, a History, 5–6 (1900–1)
- Derek Howse, Greenwich Time and the Longitude (1997)
- Ian R. Bartky, 'The Bygone Era of Time Balls', Sky and Telescope (Jan 1987), 32–35
