= Moose Mountain Creek =

River in southern Saskatchewan, Canada

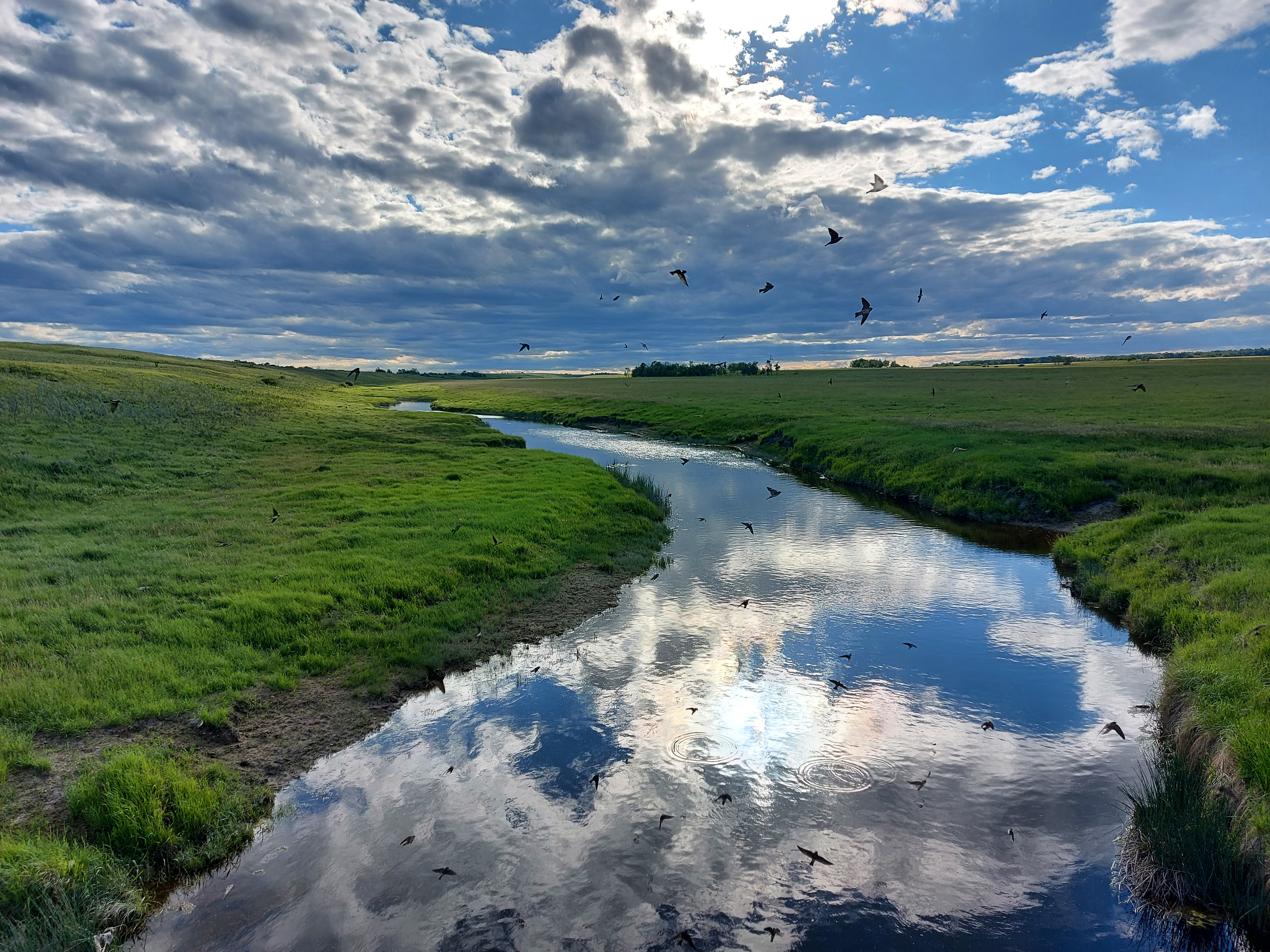
- Moose Mountain Creek

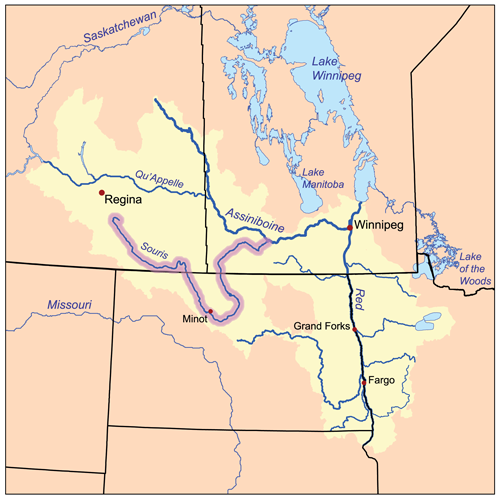
- The Red River drainage basin, with the Souris River highlighted

- Location of the mouth in Saskatchewan Moose Mountain Creek (Canada)

Location
- Countries: Canada
- Province: Saskatchewan
- Communities: Montmartre; Kisbey; Alameda; Oxbow

Physical characteristics
- Source: Chapleau Lakes, near Montmartre
  - location: Saskatchewan
  - elevation: 668 m (2,192 ft)
- Mouth: Souris River
  - location: South-west of Oxbow, Saskatchewan
  - coordinates: 49°12′55″N 102°11′47″W
  - elevation: 512 m (1,680 ft)
- Discharge
  - location: Souris River, west of Oxbow

Basin features
- River system: Red River drainage basin
- Tributaries
  - left: Wolf Creek, Crooked Creek, Swift Creek
  - right: Morrison Creek, Cowper Creek, Shepherd Creek

Moose Mountain Creek is a river in the Canadian province of Saskatchewan. Its source is the Chapleau Lakes near Montmartre and it is a tributary of the Souris River, which, in turn, is a tributary of the Assiniboine River. The whole system is part of the Red River watershed, which is part of the Hudson Bay drainage basin and in a region called the Prairie Pothole Region of North America, which extends throughout three Canadian provinces and five U.S. states. It is also within Palliser's Triangle and the Great Plains ecoregion.

The entirety of Moose Mountain Creek is in Census Division No. 1. The river passes through two Indian reserves, Ocean Man and Pheasant Rump, and eight rural municipalities: Montmartre, Chester, Golden West, Tecumseh, Brock, Moose Mountain, Moose Creek, and Enniskillen. While there are no communities along the banks of the river, there are four within two kilometres of its banks: Montmartre, Kisbey, Alameda, and Oxbow. The original location of Carlyle was located near confluence of Moose Mountain, Swift, and Morrison Creeks.

Moose Mountain Creek flows generally in a south-easterly direction, starting north-west of Moose Mountain Upland and ending up at the Souris River near Oxbow. The western and southern regions of Moose Mountain fall within the river's watershed, which is part of the Upper Souris watershed. The northern most point of Moose Mountain Creek's watershed is near McLean, which is only 41 kilometres (25 mi) away from Saskatchewan's capital, Regina.

There are two major dams along the river. The first one is Moose Mountain Dam and the second is Grant Devine Dam, both of which created large reservoirs along the course. Both reservoirs have parks; Lost Horse Hills is on Moose Mountain Lake and Moose Creek Regional Park is on Grant Devine Reservoir.

== Course ==
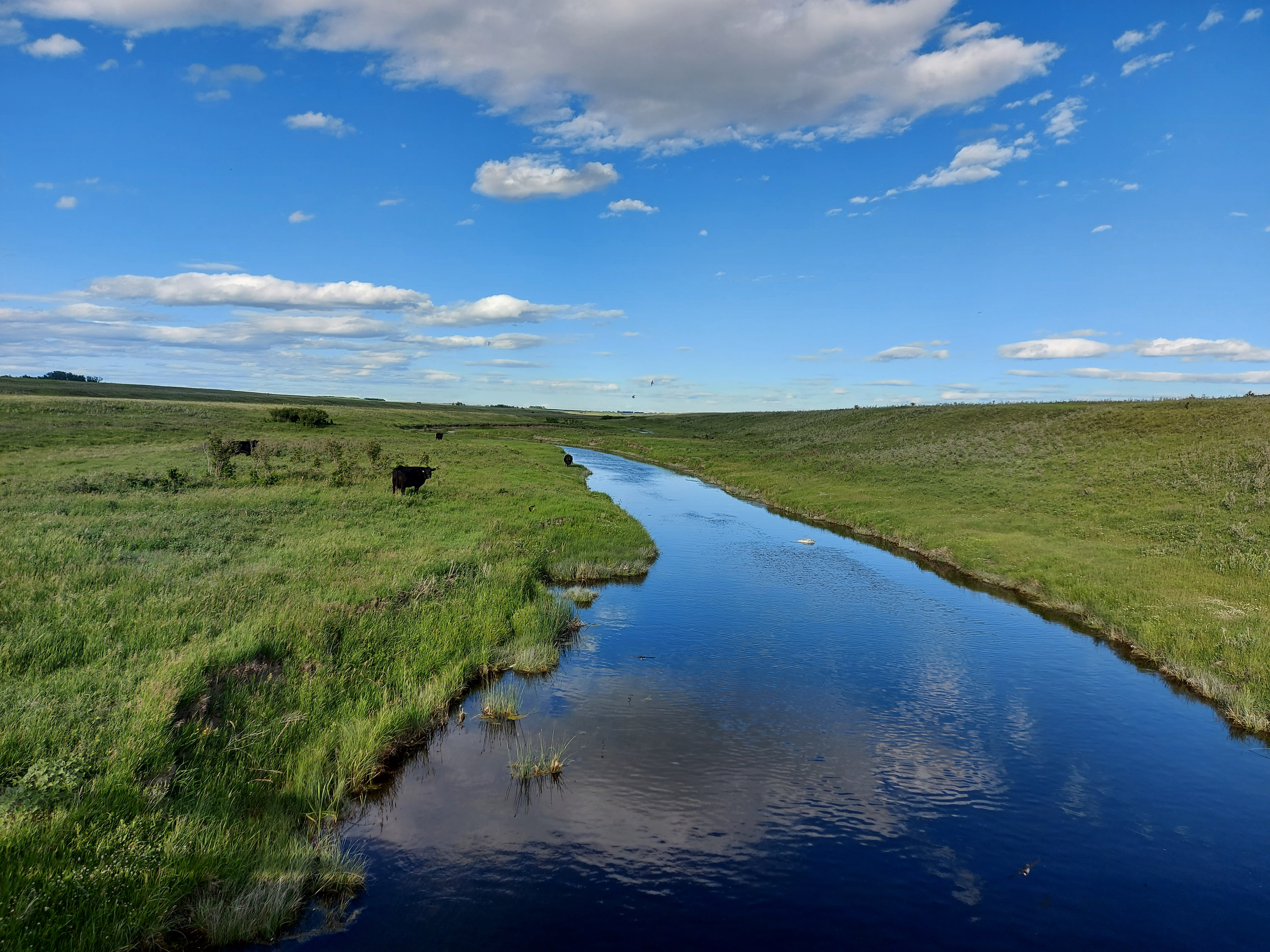
Moose Mountain Creek, looking downstream (east), about 2.5 km north of Wordsworth, Sk

The Chapleau Lakes are a chain of two lakes that run diagonally in a valley north to east. The northern most of the two lakes is the source of Moose Mountain Creek. From the outflow of that lake near Highway 48 and Highway 606, the river travels in a south-easterly direction until passes through the Saint Clair National Wildlife Area and Highway 711. From there, it empties into Moose Mountain Lake, which is a man-made reservoir. Moose Mountain Dam, which was built in 1937, is at the south-east corner of the lake, near Lost Horse Hill. From there, the river continues to flow south-east through Ocean Man Indian Reserve then Pheasant Rump Indian Reserve until it crosses Highway 13 about half-way between Forget and Kisbey, where it takes a more easterly route. The Highway 13 bridge was replaced in 2026. It is around this area, west, south, and east of Kisbey, that the river's course flattens out creating a broad floodplain. Dykes and culverts were built south of Kisbey to protect the village and control the river's flow. South of Forget, there were also culverts and other flood control measures built to control surface water before it reaches the river. From south of Kisbey, the river roughly parallels Highway 13 towards Arcola where it leaves the floodplain and flows into a valley, the Moose Mountain Creek Spillway. It continues east until it crosses Highway 9, at which point it takes a more southerly route and flows into a Grant Devine Reservoir. In 1994, the Alameda Dam was built along Moose Mountain Creek's course, near the point where it meets the Souris River, creating a large reservoir called Alameda Reservoir. In 2017, the name of the reservoir and dam were changed to Grant Devine Dam and Grant Devine Reservoir, in honour of the premier of Saskatchewan who was responsible for its construction, Grant Devine. Moose Mountain Creek is the primary inflow and outflow of the reservoir and meets the Souris River about three miles south of the dam in the Souris River Valley, near the town of Oxbow.

=== Moose Mountain Creek Spillway ===
Moose Mountain Creek Spillway is a valley that was formed during the last ice age as the path taken by melting glacial waters between two glacial lobes, the Weyburn Lobe and the Moose Mountain Lobe, en route to the Souris Spillway. On the southern side of Moose Mountain Upland, in the interlobate area, a short lived glacial lake named Lake Arcola formed along the current path of Moose Mountain Creek. Glacial moraines can be found throughout the area.

=== Tributaries ===
- Gooseberry Lake via an unnamed creek that flows into Moose Mountain Lake.
- Wolf Creek starts on the north-west side of Moose Mountain Upland and heads west. Then it turns sharply south before Highway 47 and crosses Highway 711 near Corning. Wolf Creek meets up with James Creek and Moose Mountain Creek downstream from Moose Mountain Dam.
  - James Creek starts on the north-west side of Moose Mountain Upland, on the north side of Highway 711. From there, it travels south-west until it meets up with Wolf Creek.
- Crooked Creek starts on the south side of Moose Mountain Upland and flows south across Highway 13 and past Arcola and on to Moose Mountain Creek.
- Swift Creek starts at Big Marsh Lake on the White Bear Indian Reserve and flows south, west of Carlyle, and meets up with Moose Mountain Creek just upstream from where Morrison Creek meets it.
- Morrison Creek also starts on the White Bear Indian Reserve near Ess Lake. From there it heads south to Carlyle where it runs along the west side of town though West Park and on to Moose Mountain Creek.
- Cowper Creek starts on the south-east side of Moose Mountain Upland and flows south towards Manor then south-west where it joins Moose Mountain Creek.
- Shepherd Creek starts on the plains west of Moose Mountain Creek where it flows west until it crosses Highway 9 then it drops south and flows into Grant Devine Reservoir.
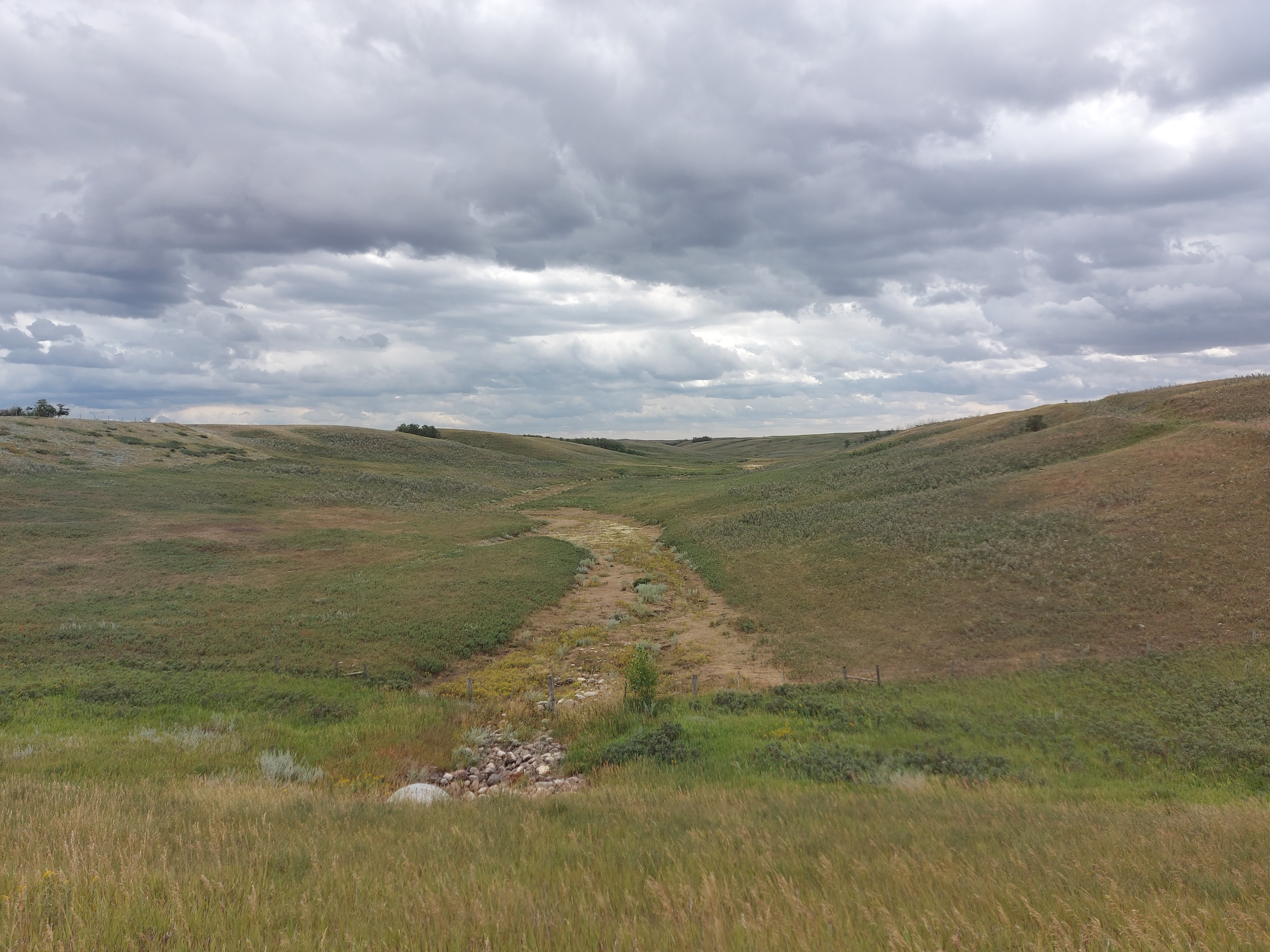
Dried up Wolf Creek west of Corning

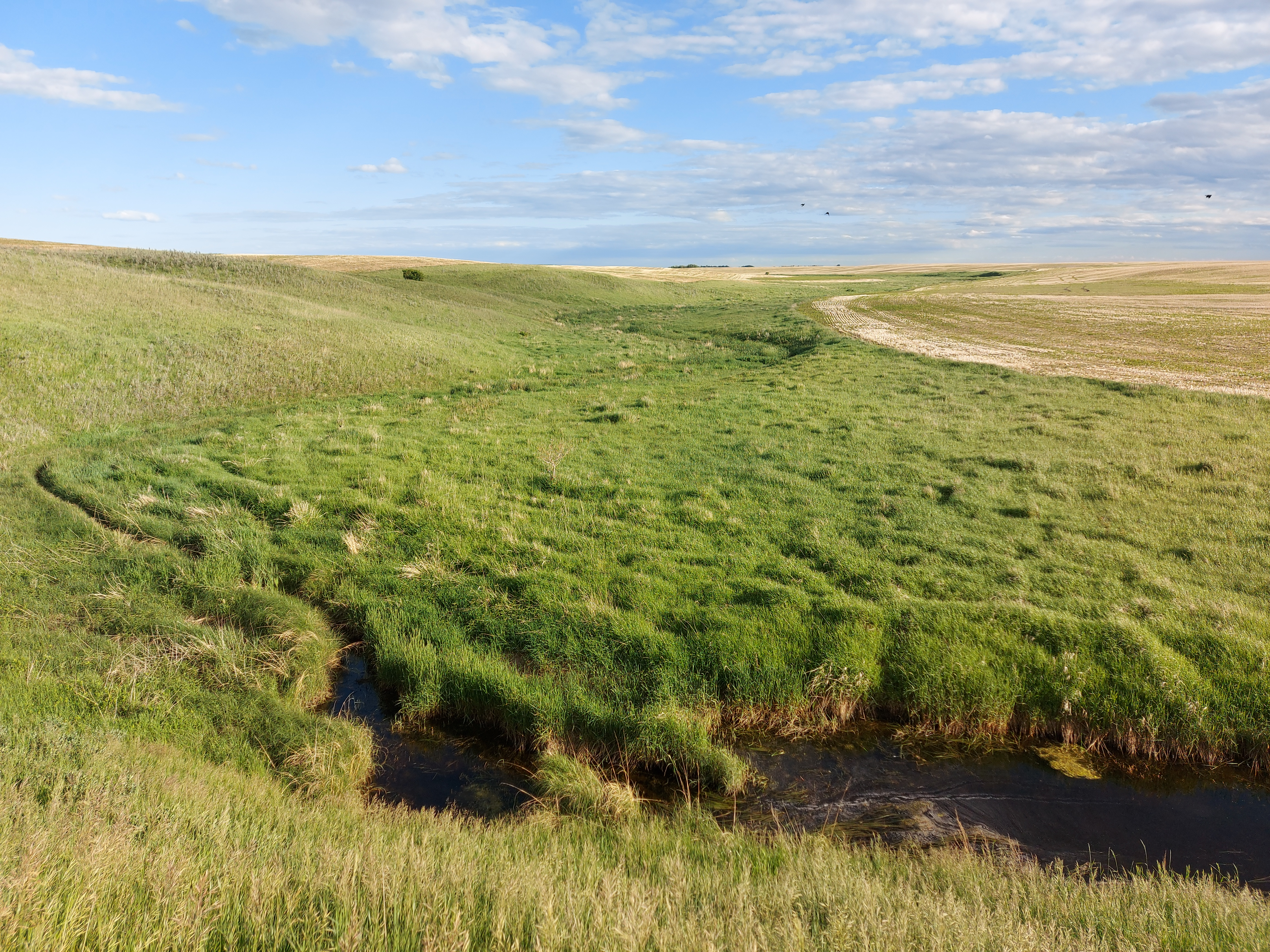
Swift Creek, south of Carlyle (about 2 miles north of the original location of Carlyle before it moved to its present location in 1900)

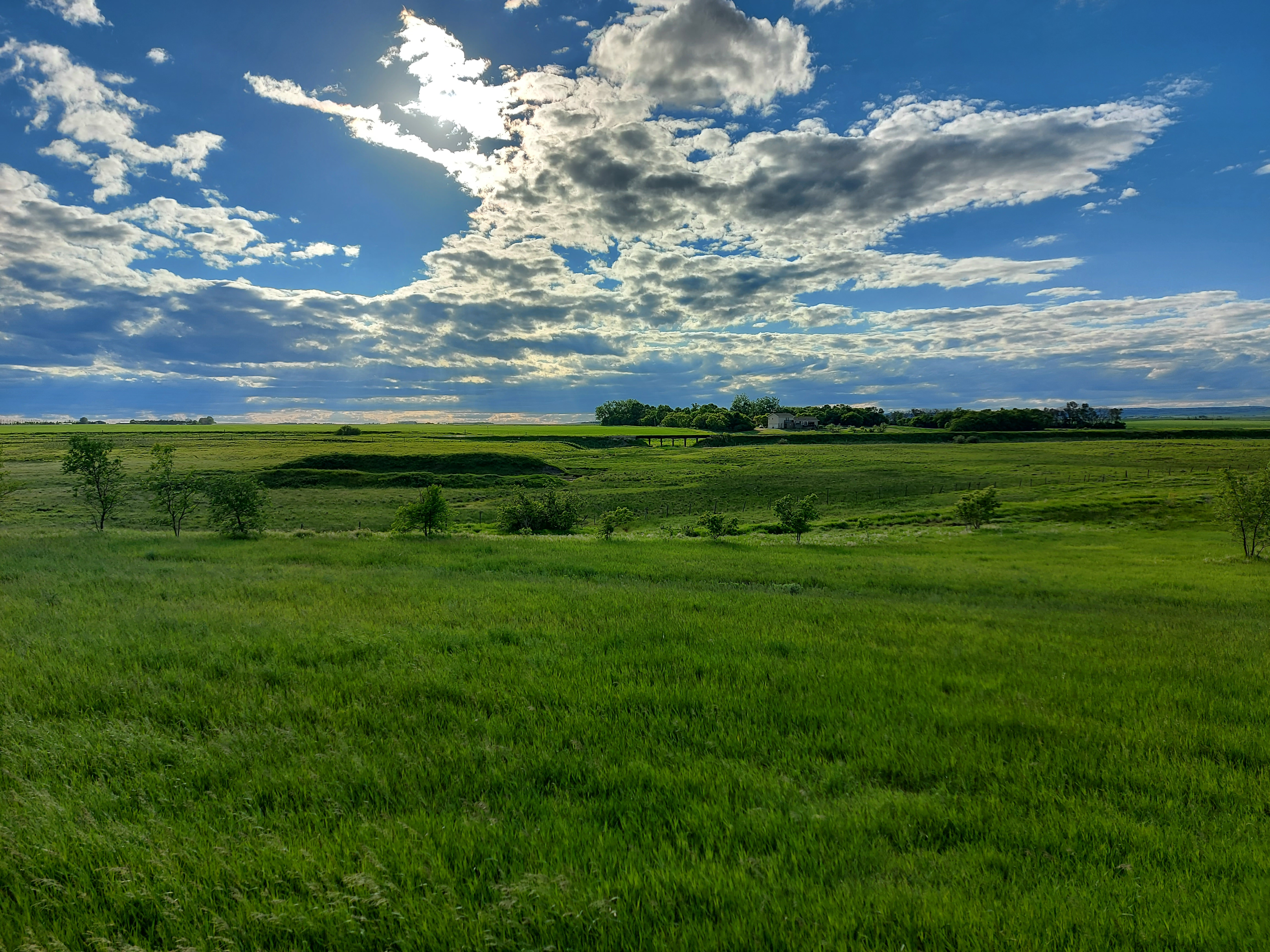
Trestle over Morrison Creek, south-west of Carlyle

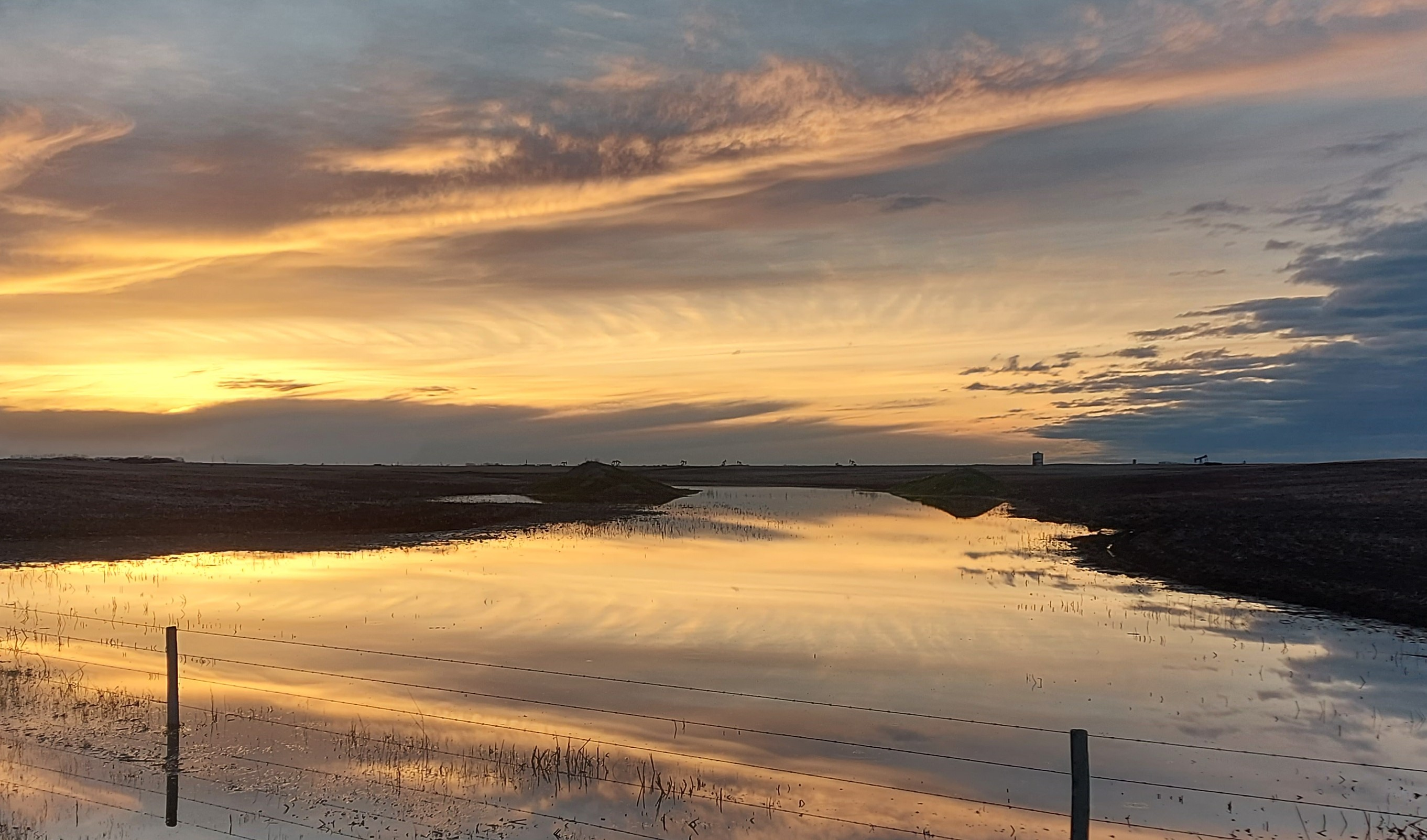
Shepherd Creek

== Saint Clair National Wildlife Area ==
Saint Clair National Wildlife Area (49.9669°N 103.1094°W) is one of 27 Prairie National Wildlife Areas in Saskatchewan. The park is at the northern end of Moose Mountain Lake, on the north side of Highway 711, about three miles west of the Highway 47 and 711 intersection. Moose Mountain Creek cuts through the park from the north-east to the south-west corner at which point it goes under Highway 711 and into the lake. It is about one square mile in size and sits in the valley at the confluence of Moose Mountain and an unnamed creek that comes in from the west.

== See also ==
- List of rivers of Saskatchewan
- Geography of Saskatchewan
- 2011 Souris River flood
