= Moose Mountain Lake =

Reservoir in Saskatchewan, Canada

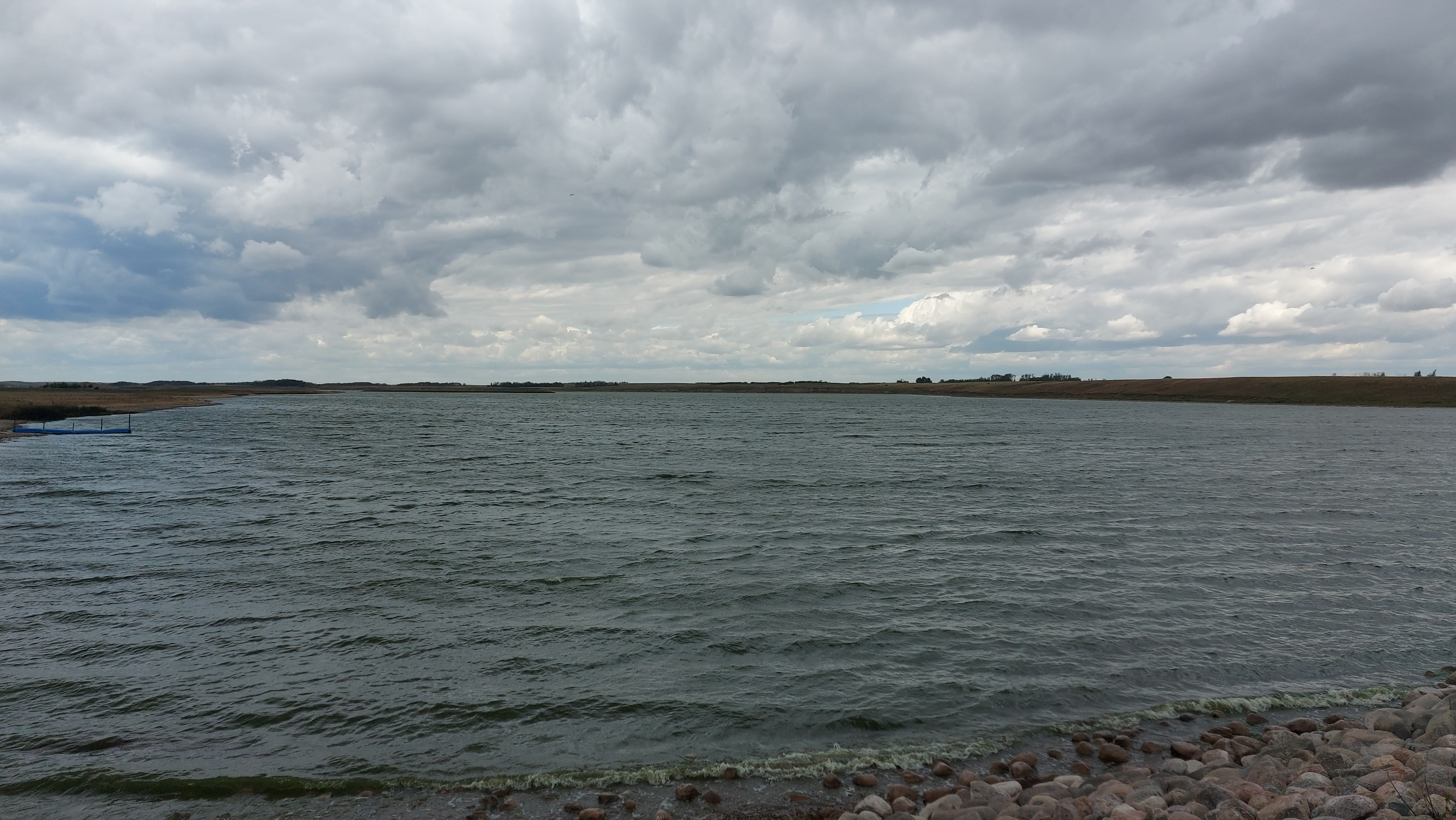
- Moose Mountain Lake

- Location in Saskatchewan Moose Mountain Lake (Canada)
- Location: Southeast Saskatchewan
- Coordinates: 49.8975°N 103.0400°W
- Type: Reservoir
- Part of: Red River drainage basin
- Primary inflows: Moose Mountain Creek
- River sources: Moose Mountain Upland
- Primary outflows: Moose Mountain Creek
- Basin countries: Canada
- Max. length: 11.2 km (7.0 mi)
- Max. width: 1.5 km (0.93 mi)
- Surface area: 395.2 ha (977 acres)
- Max. depth: 14.3 m (47 ft)
- Water volume: 11,535 dam^{3} (9,352 acre⋅ft)
- Shore length^{1}: 28 km (17 mi)
- Surface elevation: 632 m (2,073 ft)
- Settlements: None
- ^{1} Shore length is not a well-defined measure.

Moose Mountain Lake is a reservoir in the Canadian province of Saskatchewan. It is located in the RM of Golden West No. 95 in the Prairies Ecozone of Palliser's Triangle at the western edge of Moose Mountain Upland. Moose Mountain Creek is both the primary inflow and outflow of the lake; it enters at the north end and leaves at the dam in the south end. A secondary inflow that comes from Gooseberry Lake enters on the western side near the south end.

The lake runs at a diagonal in a north to east direction and is about seven miles long while less than a mile wide. The total surface area is 395 hectares (980 acres) and the shoreline measures 28 kilometres (17 mi). It was created in 1937 with the damming of Moose Mountain Creek and is situated in the Moose Mountain Creek valley, which was formed during the last ice age.

== Parks and recreation ==
Near the dam, along the lake, there is a small park with a picnic area and boat launch called Lost Horse Hills Heritage Park. It is named after the nearby Lost Horse Hills.

At the northern end, where Moose Mountain Creek flows into the lake, is Saint Clair National Wildlife Area, which is one of 28 Prairie National Wildlife Areas in Saskatchewan.

== Moose Mountain Dam ==
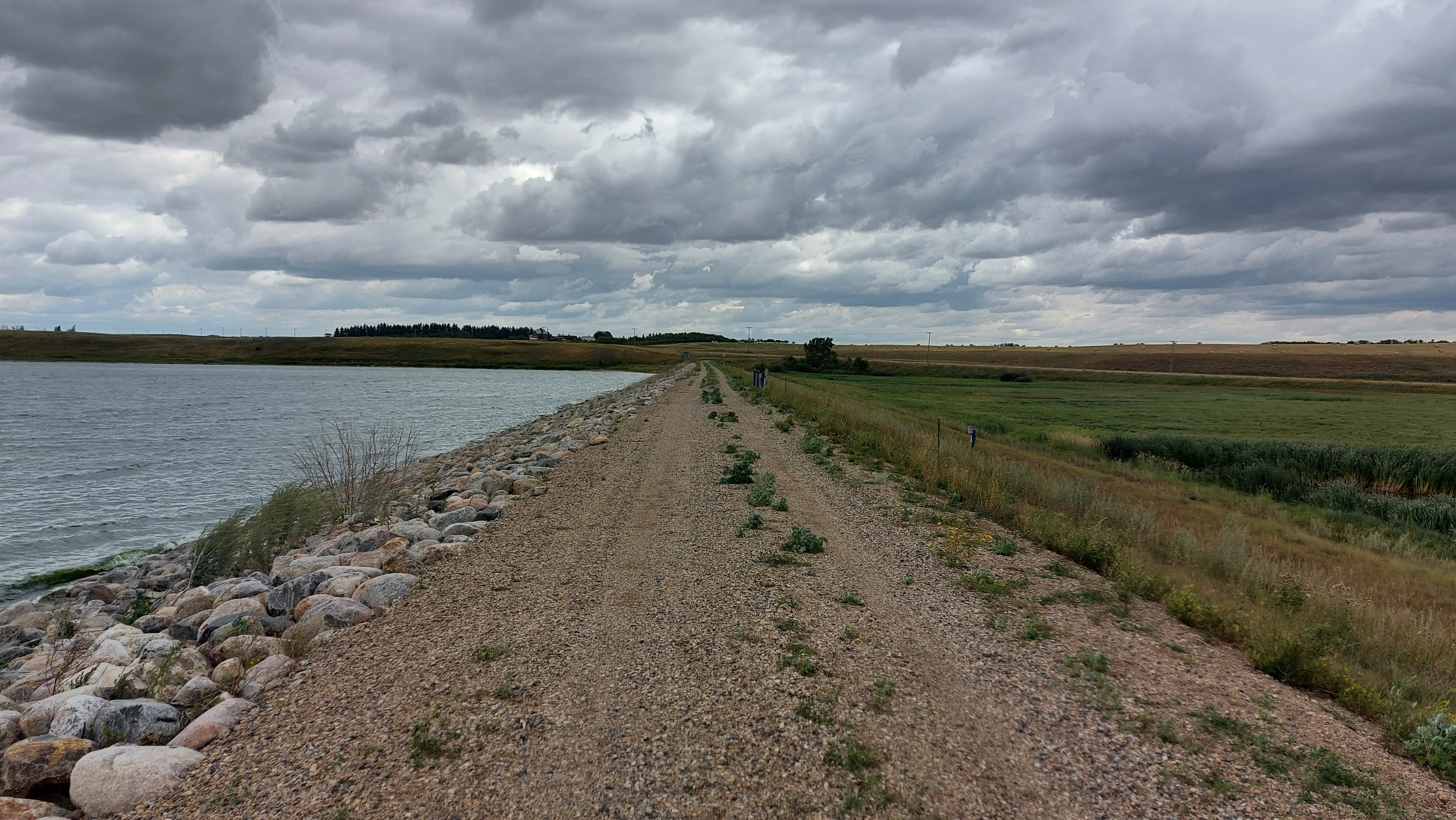
Moose Mountain Dam

Moose Mountain Dam (49.8911°N 103.0319°W) is an earthen dam built in 1937. It is owned and operated by the Saskatchewan Water Security Agency (WSA). The building of the dam created a reservoir that holds 11,535 cubic decametres (9,352 acre⋅ft) of water. The reservoir is used for irrigation, flood control, recreation, and as a wildlife and fish habitat. In 2012, the WSA spent more than $1.7 million in upgrades to the dam. Part of the upgrade was to build a fish passageway to allow migrating fish access to the reservoir. On 26 September 2012, the minister responsible for the Saskatchewan Watershed Authority, Ken Cheveldayoff, said,

"Maintaining our water infrastructure is key to our government's vision for resource management in Saskatchewan. This investment will help safeguard the health, safety, and reliability of this watershed now and years to come."

== Fish species ==
Fish commonly found in Moose Mountain Lake include northern pike and white sucker.

== Gallery ==
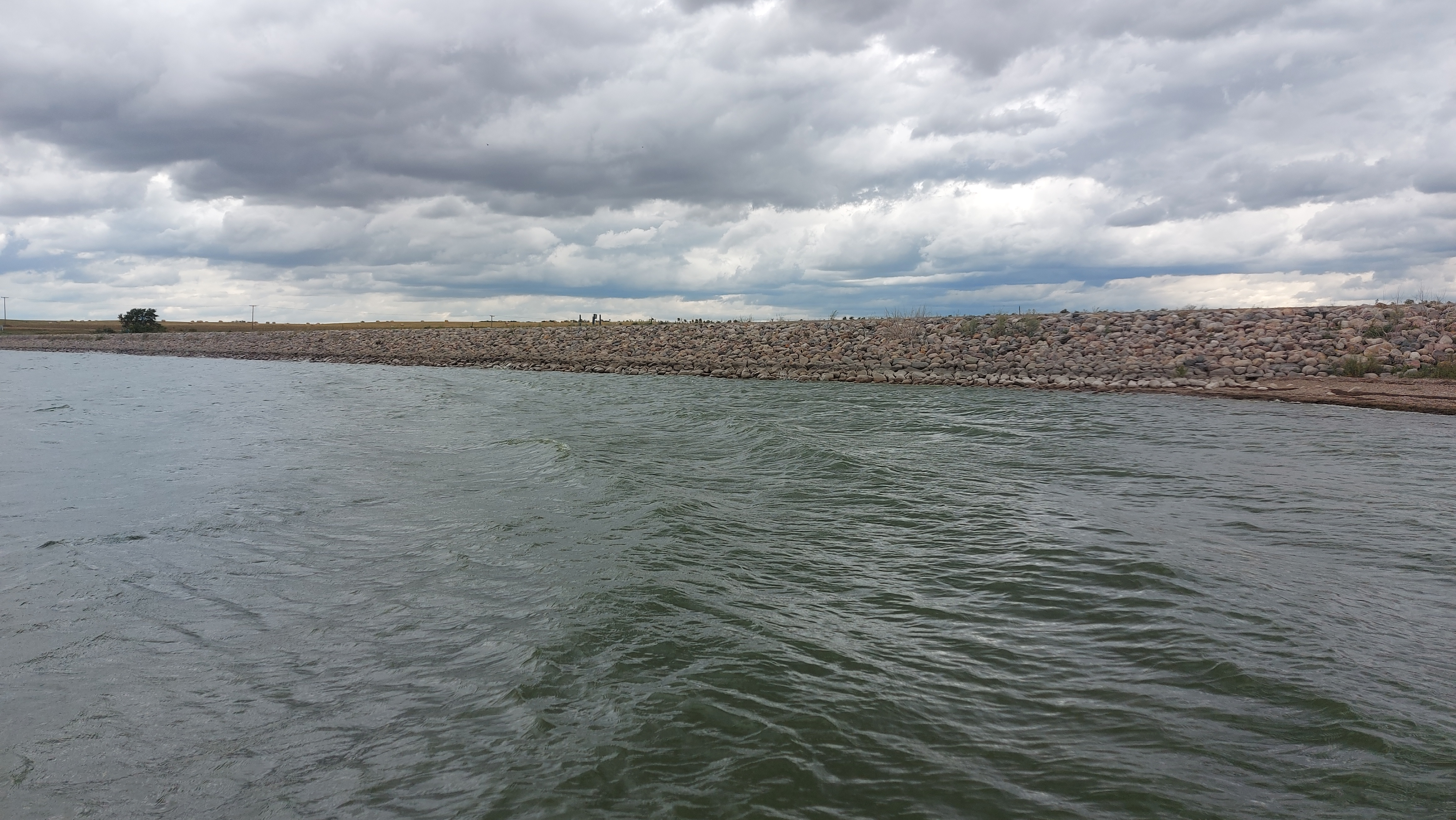
Moose Mountain Dam

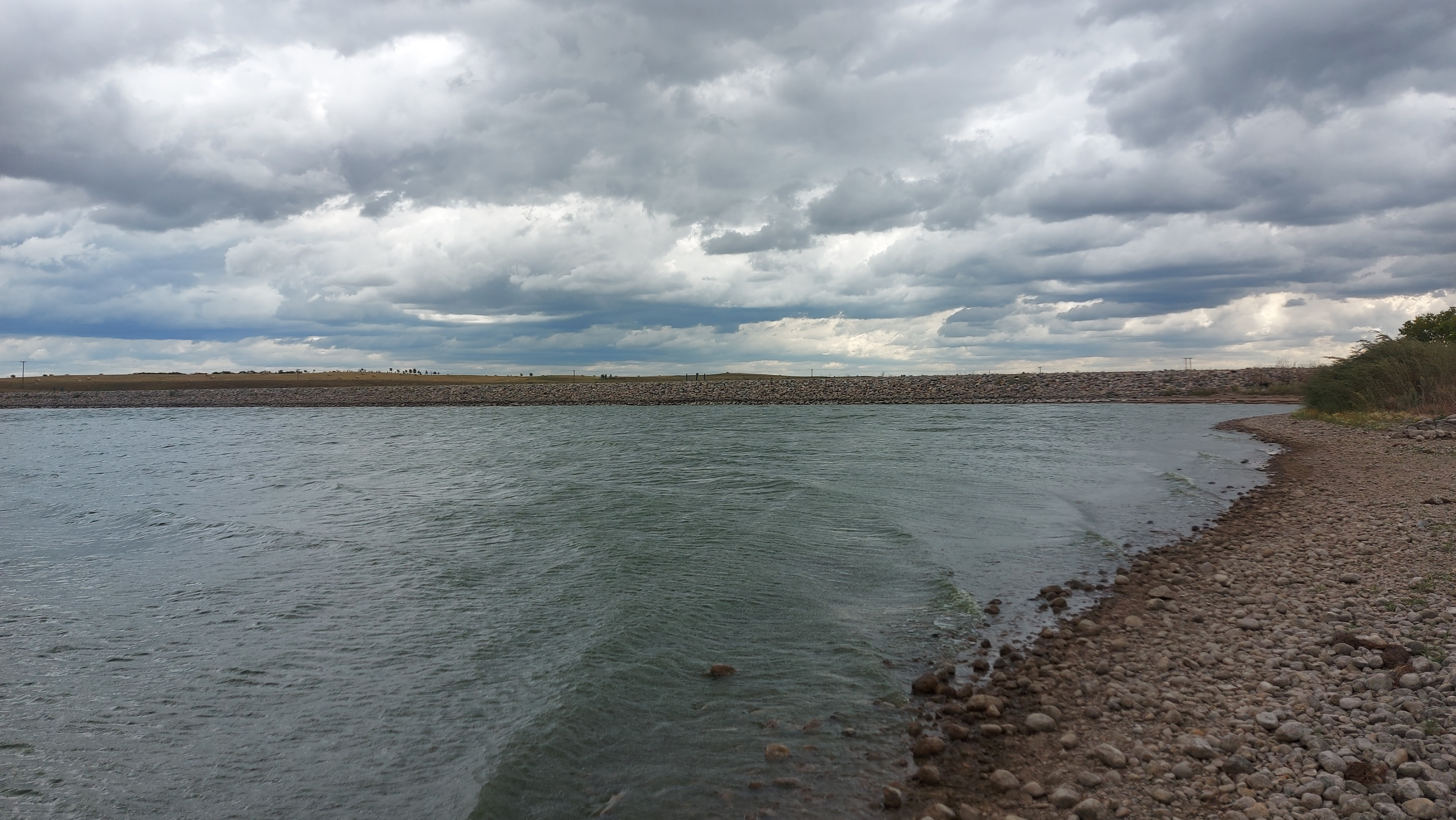
Moose Mountain Lake shore and the dam

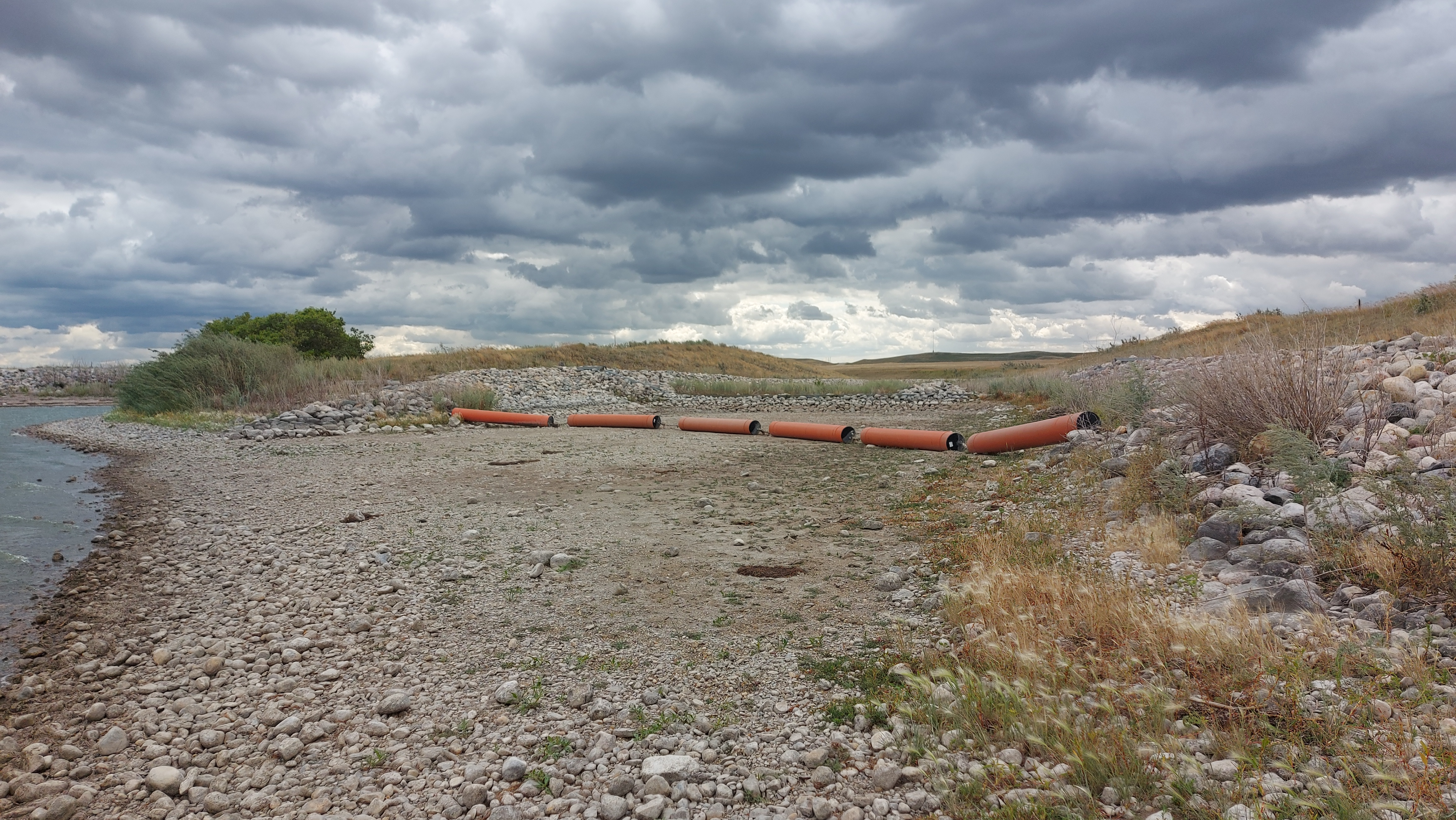
Moose Mountain Dam spillway

== See also ==
- List of lakes of Saskatchewan
- List of dams and reservoirs in Canada
- 2011 Souris River flood
