= Gooseberry Lake =

Lake in Saskatchewan, Canada

- Location in Saskatchewan Gooseberry Lake (Canada)
- Location: RM of Golden West No. 95, Saskatchewan
- Coordinates: 49.9353°N 103.1974°W
- Part of: Red River drainage basin
- Primary inflows: Dry Creek
- Primary outflows: Gooseberry Creek
- Basin countries: Canada
- Max. length: 6.6 km (4.1 mi)
- Max. width: 1.5 km (0.93 mi)
- Surface area: 320.3 ha (791 acres)
- Max. depth: 5.2 m (17 ft)
- Shore length^{1}: 15.48 km (9.62 mi)
- Surface elevation: 622 m (2,041 ft)
- Settlements: None
- ^{1} Shore length is not a well-defined measure.

Gooseberry Lake is a lake in the Canadian province of Saskatchewan. It is a shallow, natural lake located north-west of Moose Mountain Lake in the Moose Mountain Creek watershed. The lake has a large catchment area and flows into Moose Mountain Lake via the east flowing Gooseberry Creek. It is in the Prairies Ecozone of Palliser's Triangle and the area around the lake has a knob and kettle landscape with poor drainage that, during years with heavy spring run-off or rains, is known to flood.

The lake is in the RM of Golden West No. 95 and can be accessed from Highway 711. There are no settlements, facilities, nor amenities on the lake.

== Dry Lake Drainage Project ==
In 2017, then Environment Minister and now Premier of Saskatchewan, Scott Moe, announced the Dry Lake Drainage Project in the Gooseberry Lake watershed.

"The whole goal of these systems is to be able to control and organize the water flow with gates and gated culverts and such, which start, quite frankly, at the farm gate," said Scott Moe.

Dry Lake is a small, shallow lake north of Gooseberry Lake. Its watershed is north of Gooseberry Lake and west Moose Mountain Creek. A small arroyo creek flows from Dry Lake south to Gooseberry Lake. This project gives more control to local farmers regarding flood control and drainage in the Dry Lake area of the Gooseberry Lake watershed.

"They'd had some issues in the past and they were ready to co-operate ... to solve them and it's very encouraging. It's good for agriculture. It's good for the province, good for the environment, good for downstream, other producers and waterways," said Agriculture Minister Lyle Stewart.

The project involves more than 73,000 ha (180,000 acres) of land and is the largest single agricultural drainage approval project in the province's history. It gives farmers control over 30 gated culverts that will help funnel excess water off fields and into Moose Mountain Creek. The culverts can also hold water back when the river levels are high. The project also restored 14 hectares (35 acres) of wetland on existing drainage and almost 9 hectares (22 acres) of wetland retention on new drainage.

== See also ==
- List of lakes of Saskatchewan
- Geography of Saskatchewan
