= Handsworth, Saskatchewan =

Community in Saskatchewan, Canada

Coordinates: 50°45′N 106°24′W

Handsworth is a hamlet in the Rural Municipality of Golden West No. 95, Saskatchewan, Canada. The hamlet is located about 20 kilometres (12 mi) east of the town of Creelman on Highway 701, along a former Canadian Pacific Railway branch line.

== See also ==
- List of communities in Saskatchewan
- List of hamlets in Saskatchewan
