= Grant Devine Dam =

Dam and reservoir in Saskatchewan, Canada

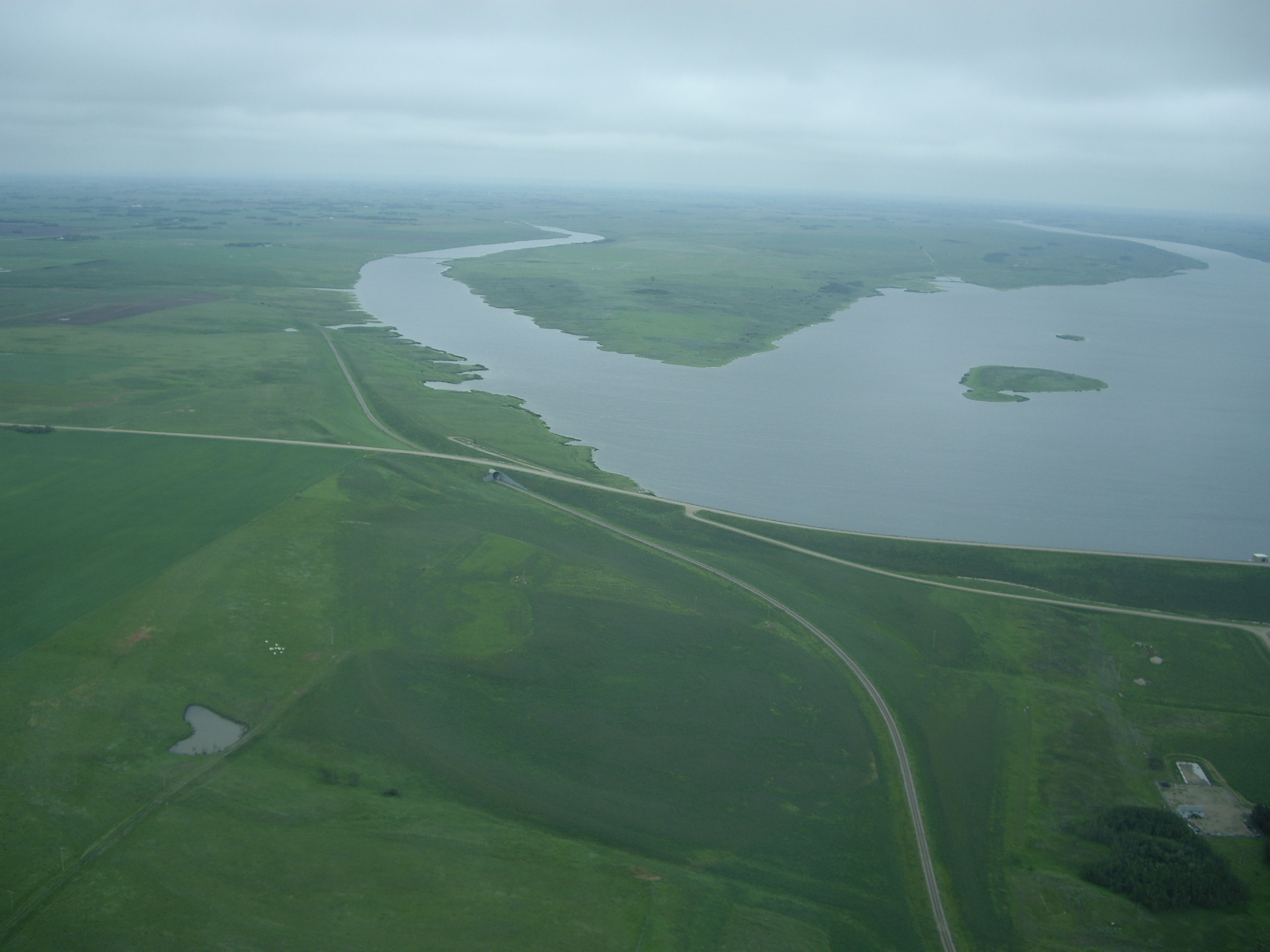
- Grant Devine Dam and reservoir
- Interactive map of Grant Devine Dam
- Location: RM of Enniskillen No. 3, near Alameda, Saskatchewan
- Coordinates: 49°15′32″N 102°13′51″W
- Opening date: 1994
- Owner: Saskatchewan Water Security Agency

Dam and spillways
- Type of dam: Embankment dam
- Impounds: Moose Mountain Creek
- Height: 42 m (138 ft)
- Length: 1,660 m (5,450 ft)
- Spillway capacity: 1,400 m^{3} (49,000 cu ft) per second

Reservoir
- Creates: Grant Devine Reservoir
- Total capacity: 105,000 dam^{3} (85,000 acre⋅ft)
- Catchment area: 2,130 km^{2} (820 sq mi)
- Surface area: 1,240 ha (3,100 acres)
- Maximum water depth: 35 metres (115 ft)

The Grant Devine Dam, formerly Alameda Dam, is an embankment dam in the Canadian province of Saskatchewan near Alameda and Oxbow. It was constructed in 1994 to control flows on Moose Mountain Creek and Souris River. It provides flood protection and irrigation for this area of Saskatchewan, along with protection for Minot, North Dakota. The Grant Devine Reservoir provides opportunities for recreational use such as boating and fishing. At the full supply level of 562 metres (1,844 ft), the reservoir holds 105,000 dam^{3} (85,000 acre⋅ft) of water. The project is owned and operated by the Saskatchewan Water Security Agency (formerly Saskatchewan Watershed Authority).

== Structure ==
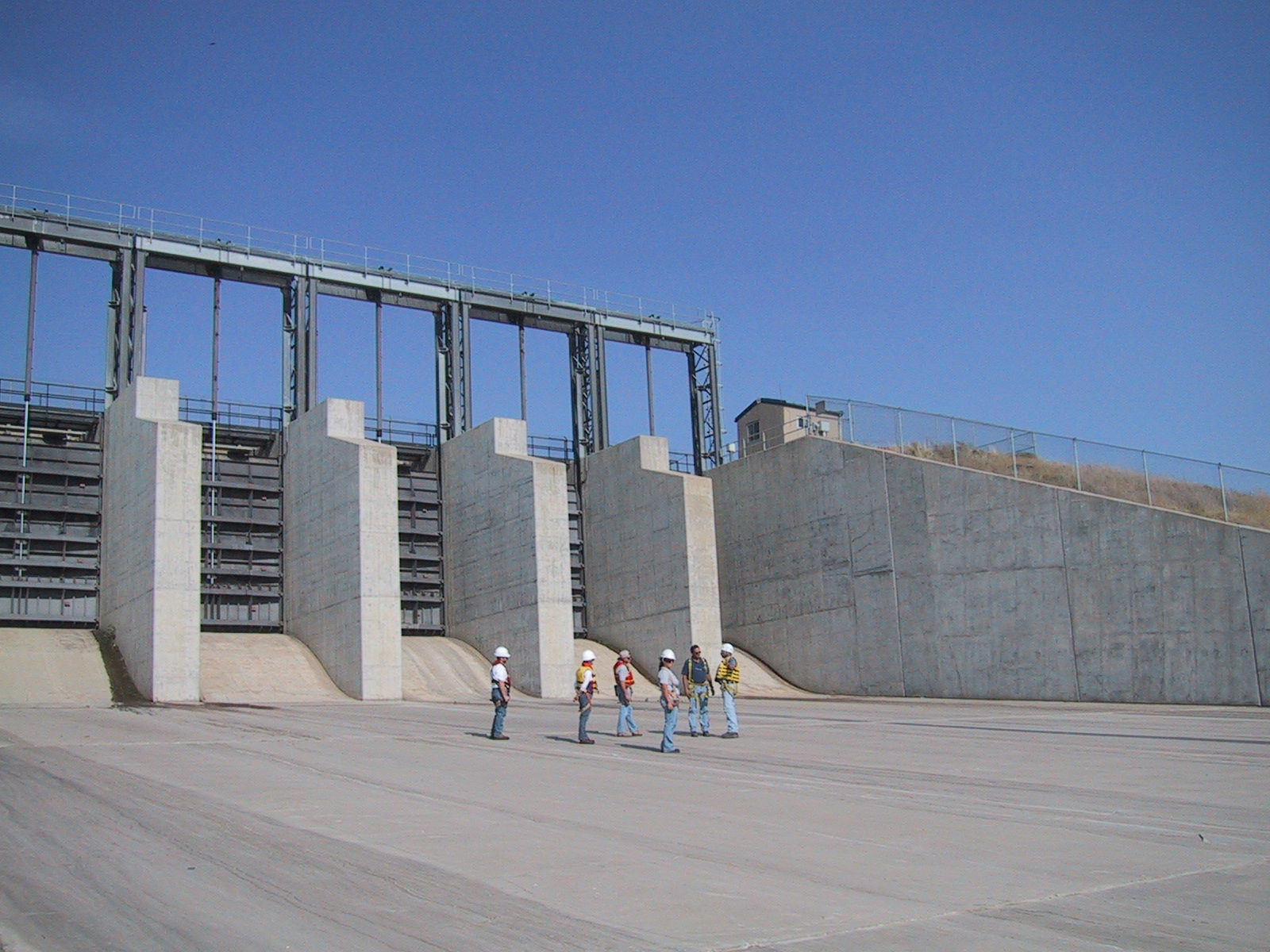
Spillway at Grant Devine Dam, showing hydraulically operated vertical lift gates.

The Grant Devine Dam is a 1,660-metre (5,450 ft) long earthfill dam, with a height of 42 metres (138 ft). The volume of earth in the main dam is 2,900,000 m^{3} (100,000,000 cu ft). The dam is protected by a 224-metre (735 ft) long spillway with a maximum discharge capacity of 1,400 cubic metres (49,000 cu ft) per second.

The dam includes a low-level outlet structure for discharge of water to maintain the quality of the riparian environment downstream of the project, and for irrigation outflow.

The reservoir has a surface area of 12.4 square kilometres (4.8 sq mi) at full supply level. The surrounding drainage area is 2,140 square kilometres (830 sq mi).

A full-time staff of about five people supervises and operates this dam and the Rafferty Dam built at the same time. Together, the two projects provide flow control on the Souris River and flood protection for the city of Minot. Operation of the project is governed by an international treaty between Canada and the United States.

== Moose Creek Regional Park ==
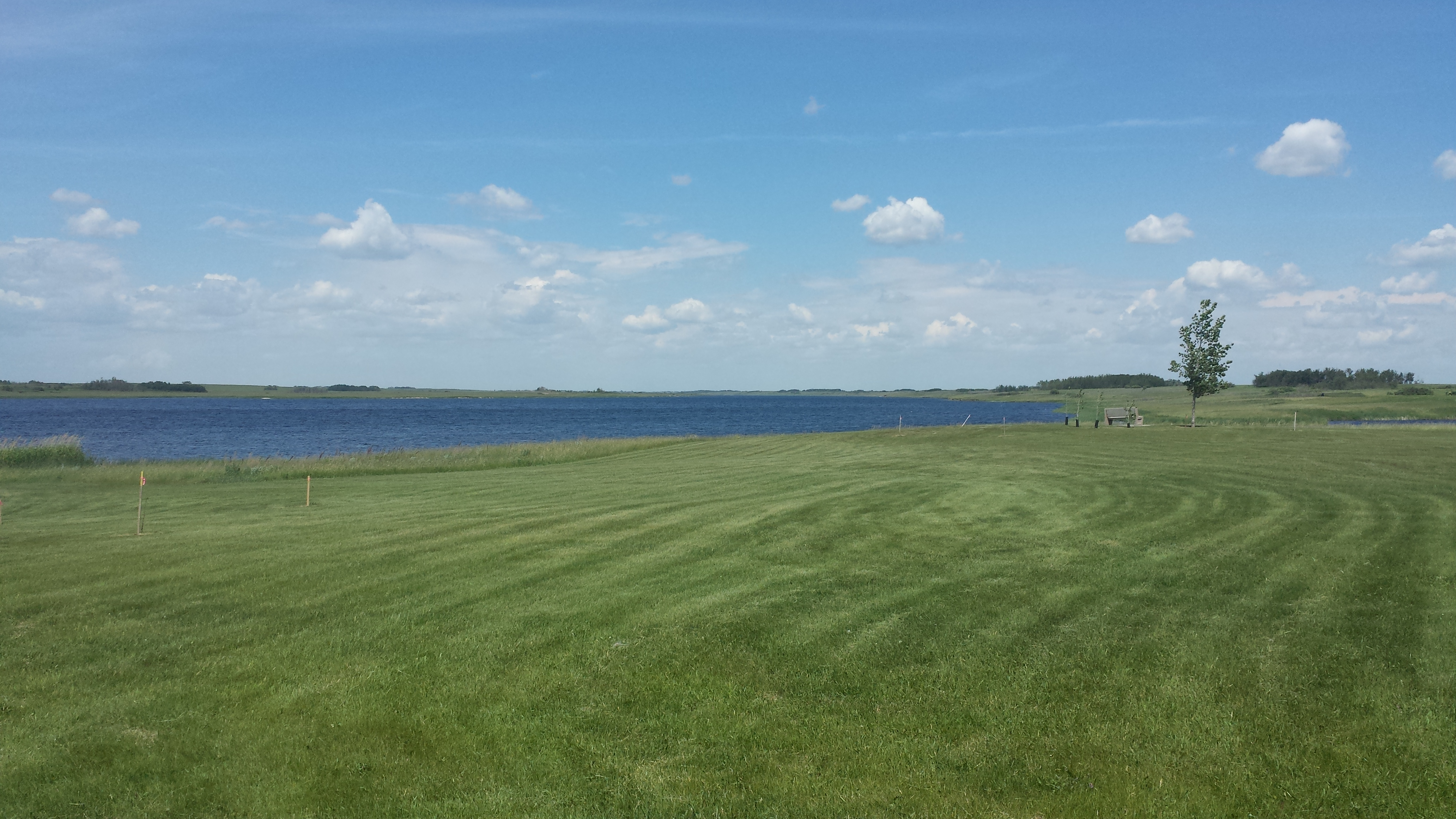
Grant Devine Reservoir, viewed from Moose Creek Regional Park

Moose Creek Regional Park (49.2939°N 102.2022°W) is a regional park on the east side of the reservoir, 3 kilometres (1.9 mi) north of the dam. The park encompasses about 3/4 of a section, which is about 480 acres. The park is 3 kilometres (1.9 mi) east of Alameda off of Highway 9 and 6 kilometres (3.7 mi) north of Oxbow off of Highway 18. The park features full-service camping, tenting, picnicking, swimming, boating, and fishing. There is also Moose Creek Golf Club, a 9-hole golf course. The third weekend in June each year, the Alameda Fishing Derby takes place on the lake.

== See also ==
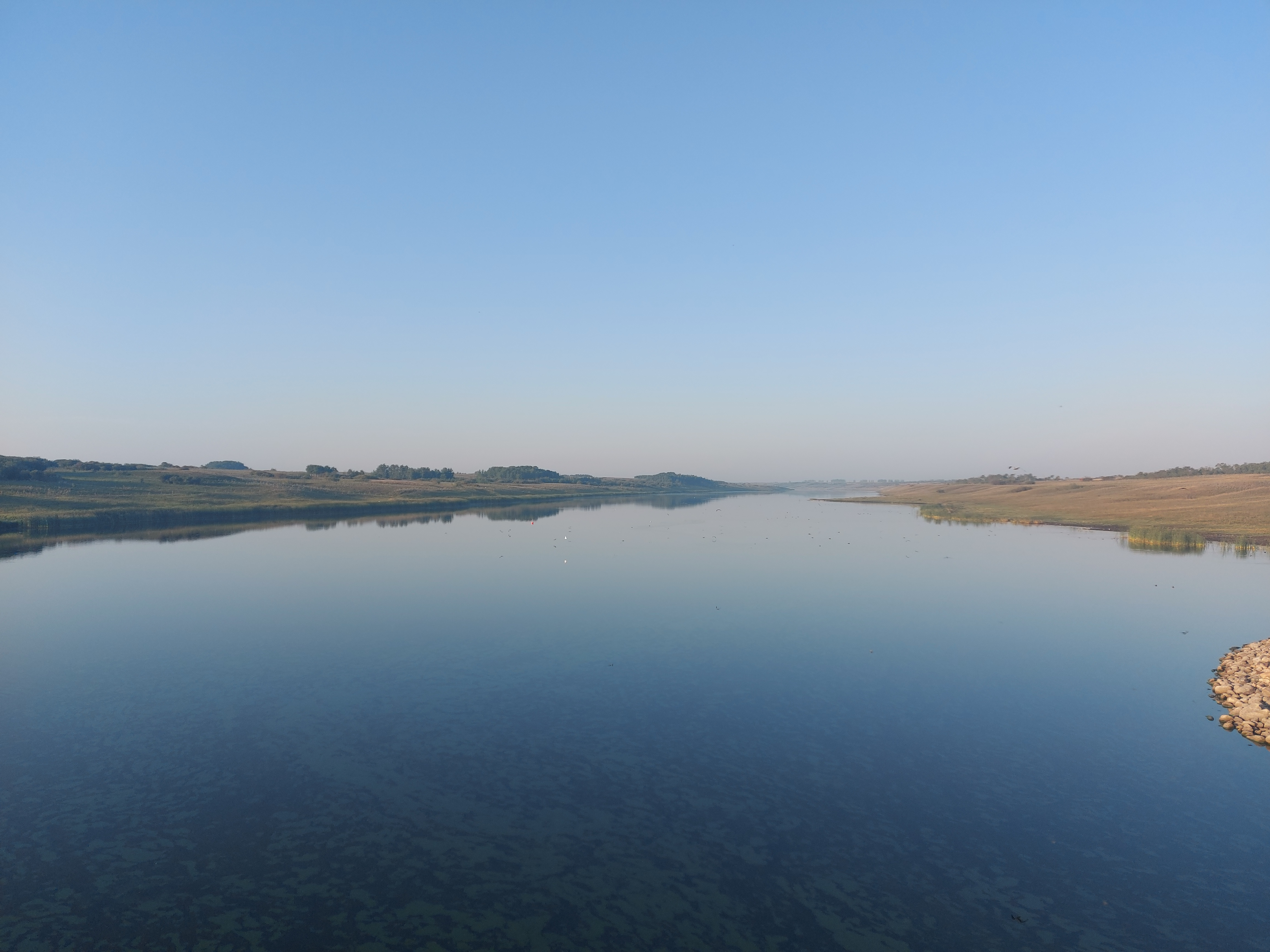
Grant Devine Reservoir

- List of protected areas of Saskatchewan
- List of dams and reservoirs in Canada
- Saskatchewan Water Security Agency
- List of lakes of Saskatchewan
- Lake Darling Dam
