= Corning, Saskatchewan =

Hamlet in Saskatchewan, Canada

Coordinates: 49°57′27″N 102°58′19″W

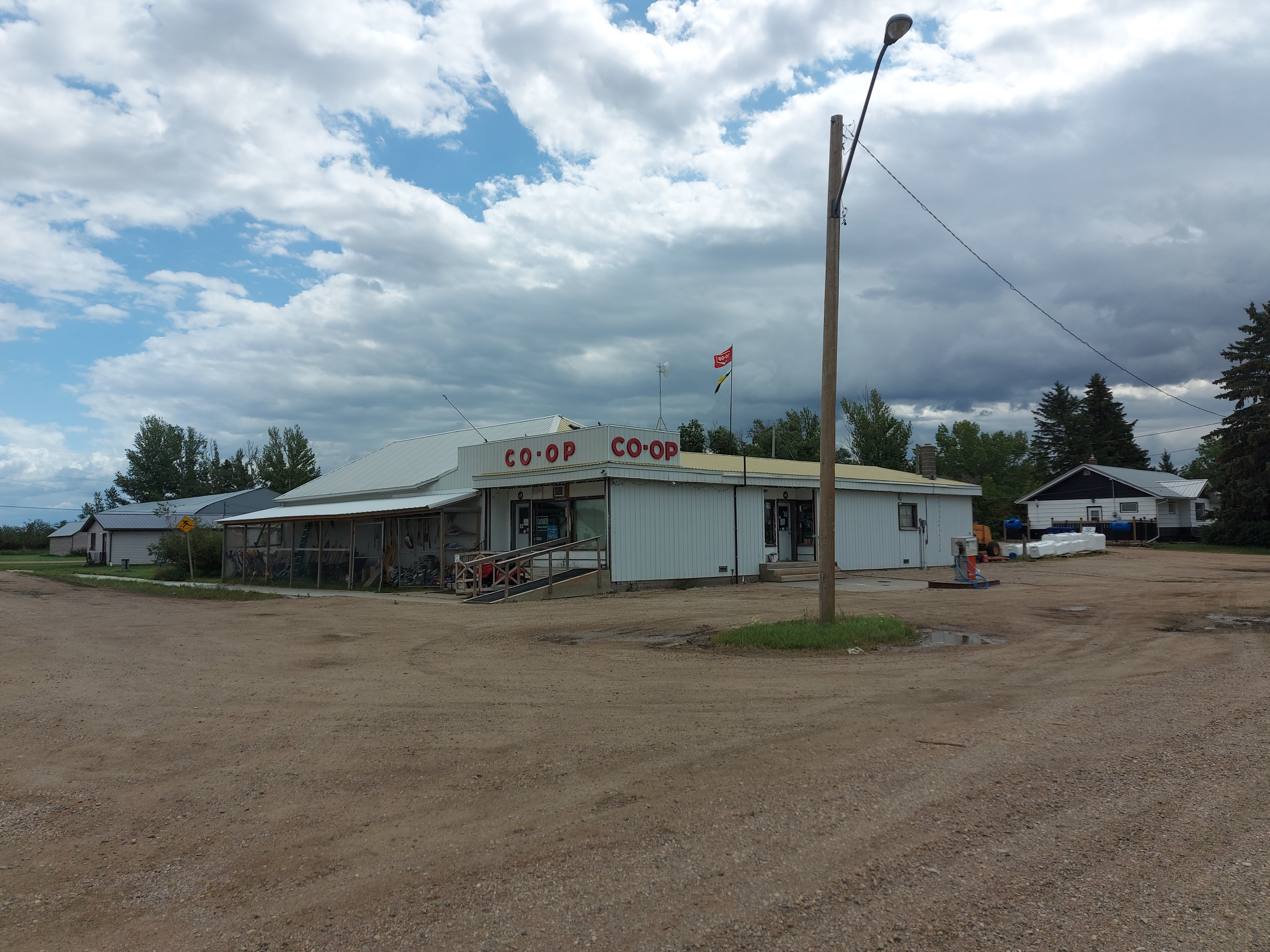
Downtown Corning

Corning is a hamlet in the Canadian province of Saskatchewan.

== Geography ==
Corning is in the RM of Golden West along Highway 711, about 4 kilometres (2.5 mi) east of Highway 47.

== Demographics ==
In the 2021 Census of Population conducted by Statistics Canada, Corning had a population of 25 living in 12 of its 12 total private dwellings, a change of 0% from its 2016 population of 25. With a land area of 0.21 km^{2} (0.081 sq mi), it had a population density of 119.0/km^{2} (308.3/sq mi) in 2021.

== See also ==
- List of communities in Saskatchewan
