= Alameda, Saskatchewan =

Town in Saskatchewan

Alameda
- Town
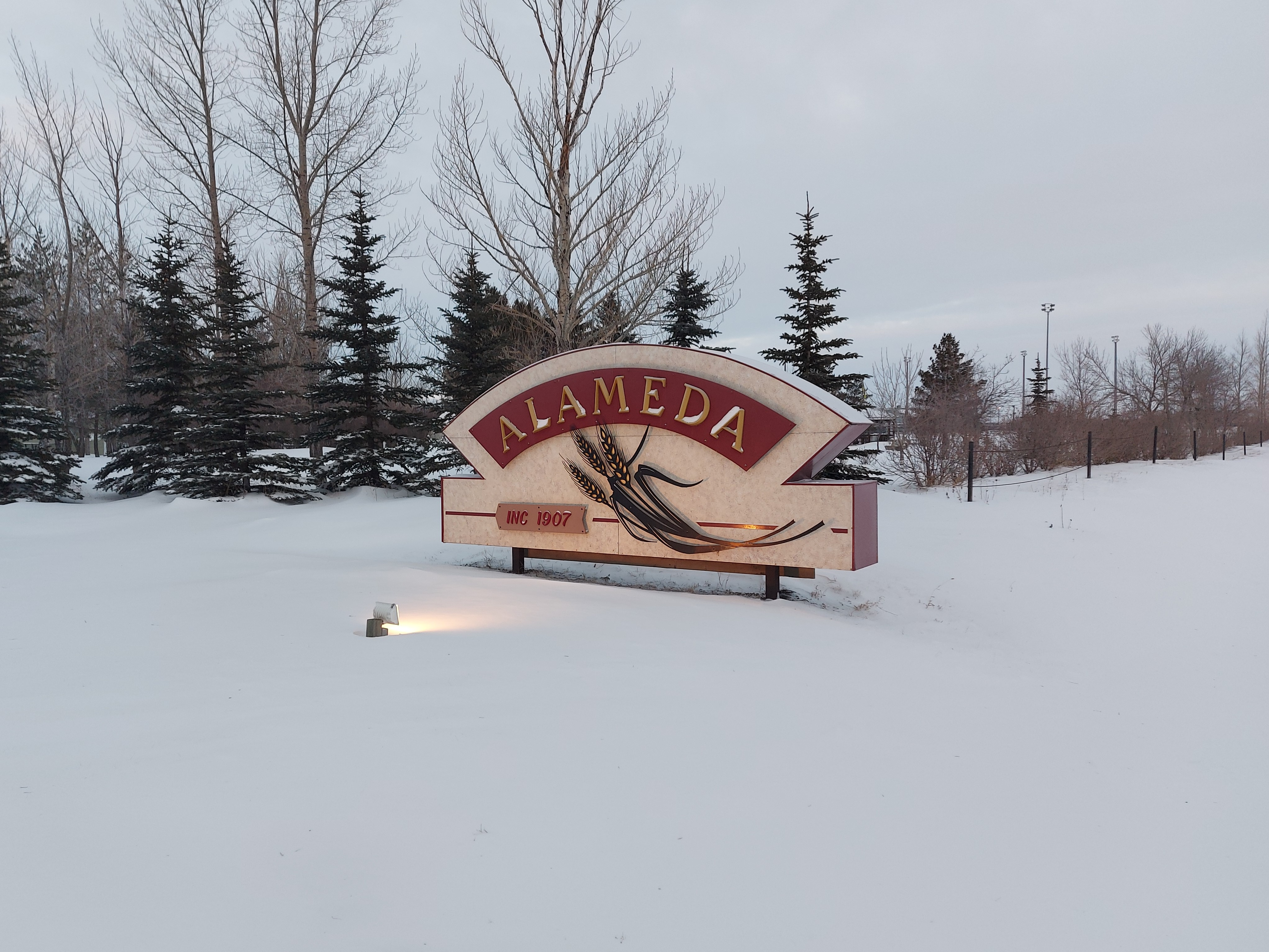
- Alameda

- Location of Alameda in Saskatchewan Alameda (Canada)
- Coordinates: 49.26°N 102.28°W
- Country: Canada
- Province: Saskatchewan
- Census division: 1
- Rural Municipality: Moose Creek No. 33
- Post office Founded: 1883

Government
  - Mayor: Perry Kinder
  - Town Manager: Michelle Needham
  - Governing body: Alameda Town Council

Area
  - Total: 2.55 km^{2} (0.98 sq mi)

Population (2021)
  - Total: 345
  - Density: 144.5/km^{2} (374/sq mi)
- Time zone: CST
- Postal code: S0C 0A0
- Area code: 306
- Highways: Highway 9 / Highway 700
- Waterways: Grant Devine Reservoir
- Climate: Dfb
- Website: Official website

Alameda is a town in south-eastern Saskatchewan, Canada, approximately 50 kilometres (31 mi) east of Estevan. A translation of Alameda from Spanish is "Poplar Grove" or "Tree Lined Avenue". One popular story is that the town was named for Alameda, California although there is no written documentation to support this. Alameda had a population of 345 in the Canada Census of 2021.

Alameda is situated in the south-east corner of Saskatchewan. The closest larger centres to Alameda are Estevan, Weyburn, Regina. Alameda sits in an area that is abundant with grain, oil, and water.

== Demographics ==
In the 2021 Census of Population conducted by Statistics Canada, Alameda had a population of 345 living in 162 of its 187 total private dwellings, a change of −6.5% from its 2016 population of 369. With a land area of 2.53 km^{2} (0.98 sq mi), it had a population density of 136.4/km^{2} (353.2/sq mi) in 2021.

Canada census – Alameda community profile

	2021	2011
Population	345 (-6.5% from 2016)	342 (+11.0% from 2006)
Land area	2.53 km^{2} (0.98 sq mi)	2.55 km^{2} (0.98 sq mi)
Population density	136.6/km^{2} (354/sq mi)	133.9/km^{2} (347/sq mi)
Median age	40.0 (M: 38.0, F: 43.2)	44.2 (M: 39.0, F: 46.7)
Private dwellings	187 (total) 162 (occupied)	162 (total)
Median household income	$88,000

References: 2021 2011

== Amenities ==
Alameda offers the following community facilities: a community ice rink (skating, curling), Heritage museum, and the Alameda Merry Makers Senior Centre.

Alameda offered a wide range of services for its residents, which included a full-service grocery and meat store, a restaurant, a banking institution, full-service campground as well as many others. As with other small communities in Saskatchewan, many of the businesses are closing and/or closed and the residents drive to other communities for services that once were in their community.

Alameda is near the Grant Devine Dam (formerly the Alameda Dam). There is a full-service regional park on the eastern shore of Grant Devine Reservoir called Moose Creek Regional Park. The Grant Devine Reservoir is the home of the Alameda Fishing Derby which takes place the 3rd weekend of June each year.

Alameda hosts various events throughout the year including the Alameda Agricultural Society fair and 4-H show and sale and the Alameda Flower Show.

== Gallery ==
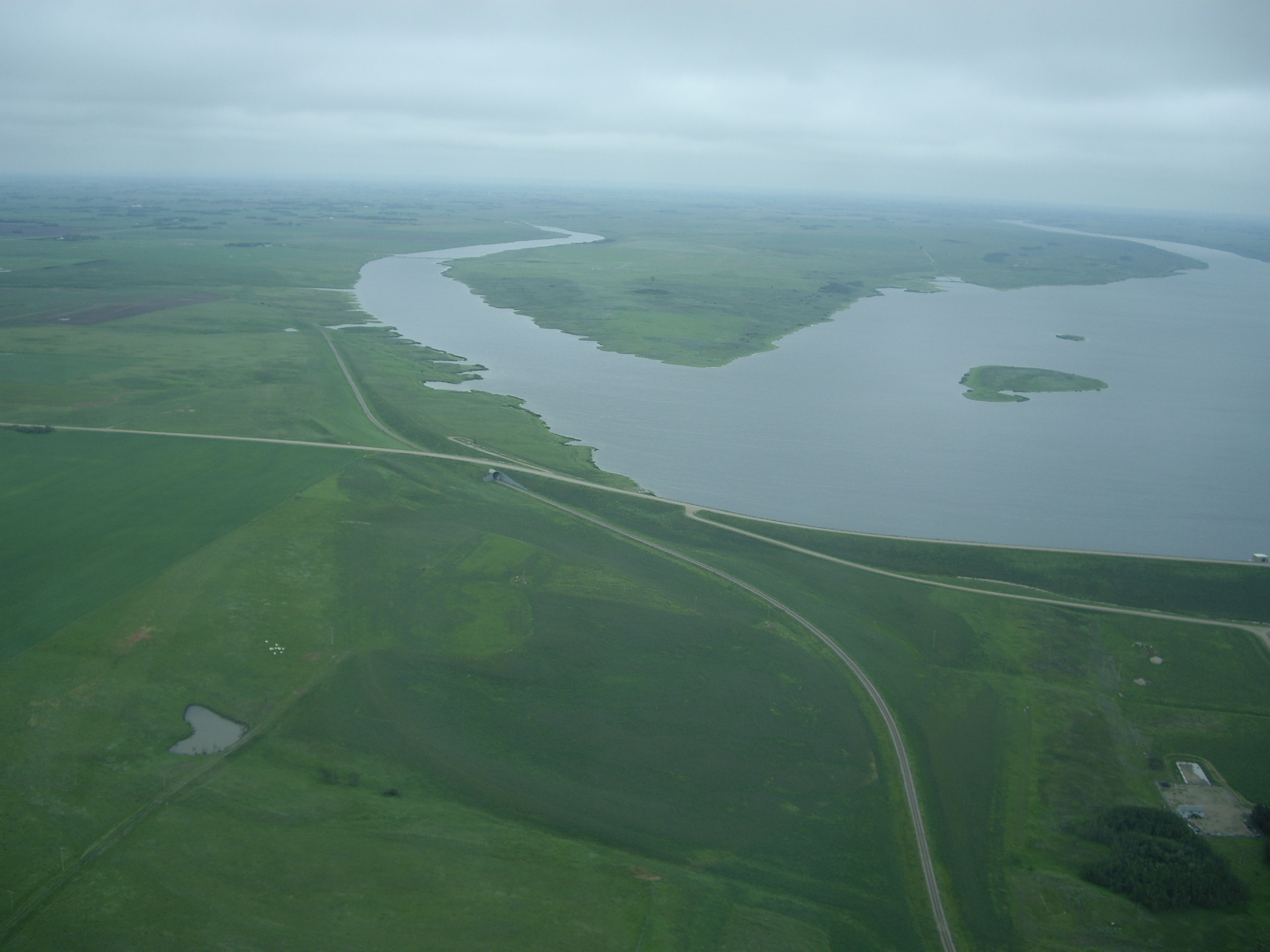
Grant Devine Reservoir & Dam

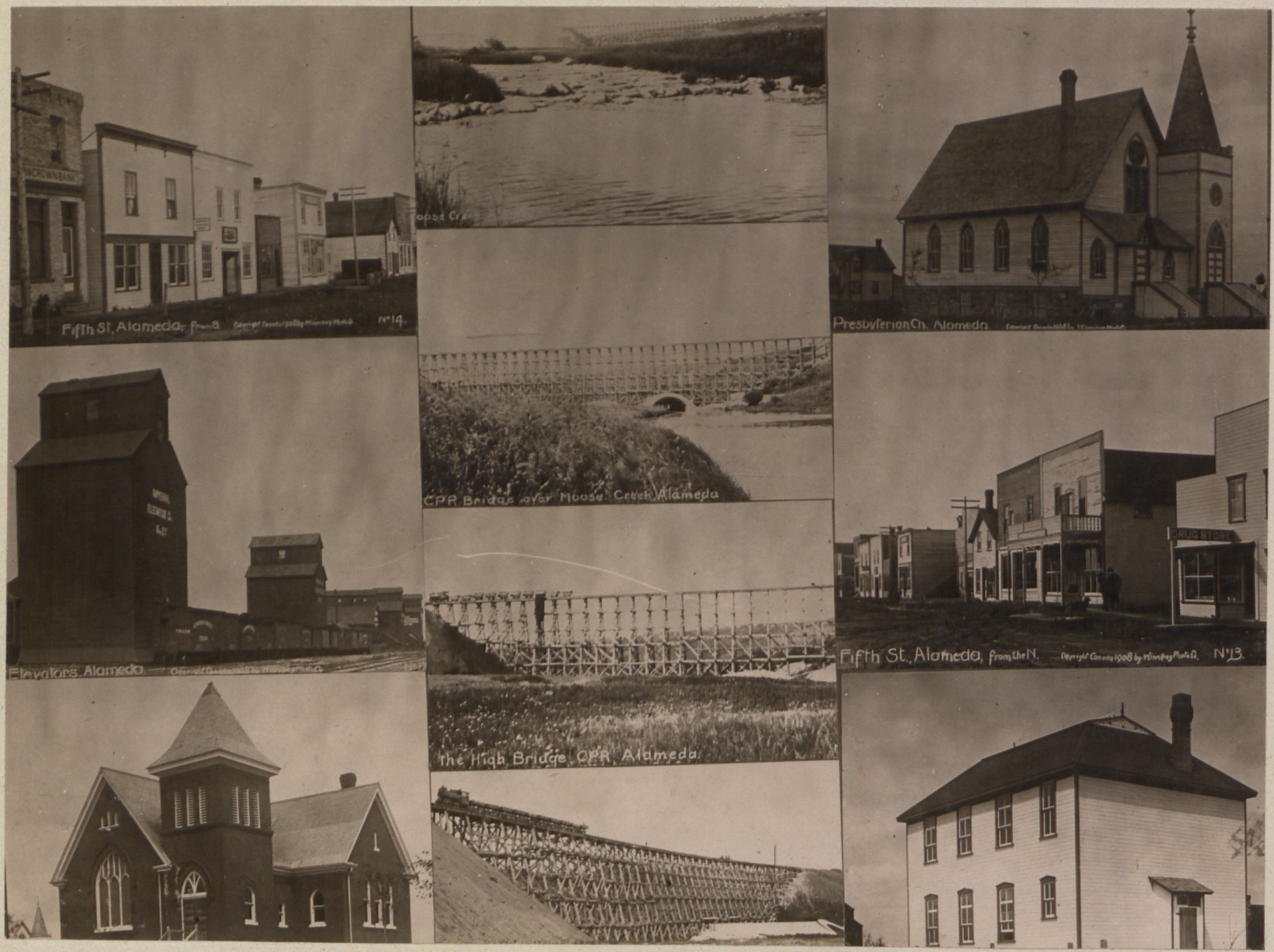
Views of Alameda 1909

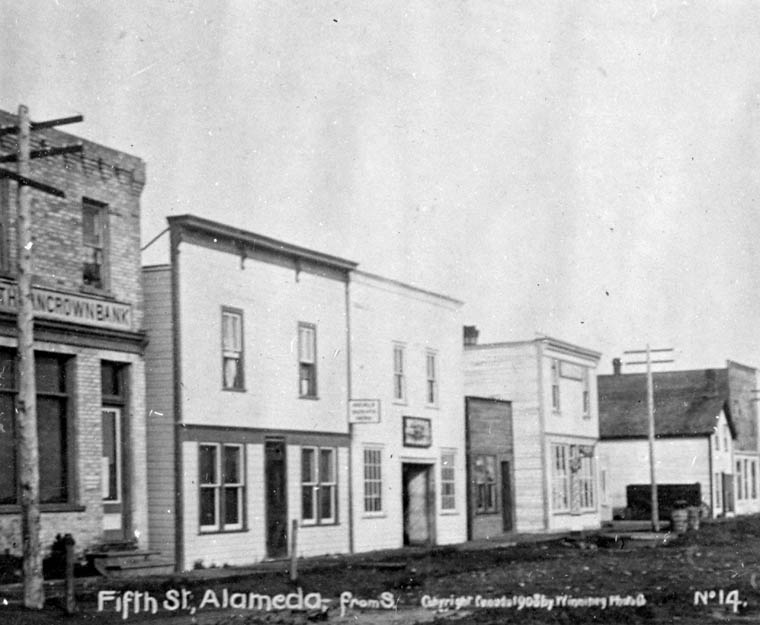
Fifth Street in 1908

== Notable people ==
- George Ramsay Cook — OC, FRSC, Canadian historian and general editor of the Dictionary of Canadian Biography.
- John James Harrop — Politician
- Trent Whitfield — former National Hockey League player

== See also ==
- List of communities in Saskatchewan
- List of towns in Saskatchewan
- Lists of Canadian tornadoes and tornado outbreaks
