= Rural Municipality of Golden West No. 95 =

Rural municipality in Saskatchewan, Canada

Golden West No. 95
- Rural municipality
- Rural Municipality of Golden West No. 95
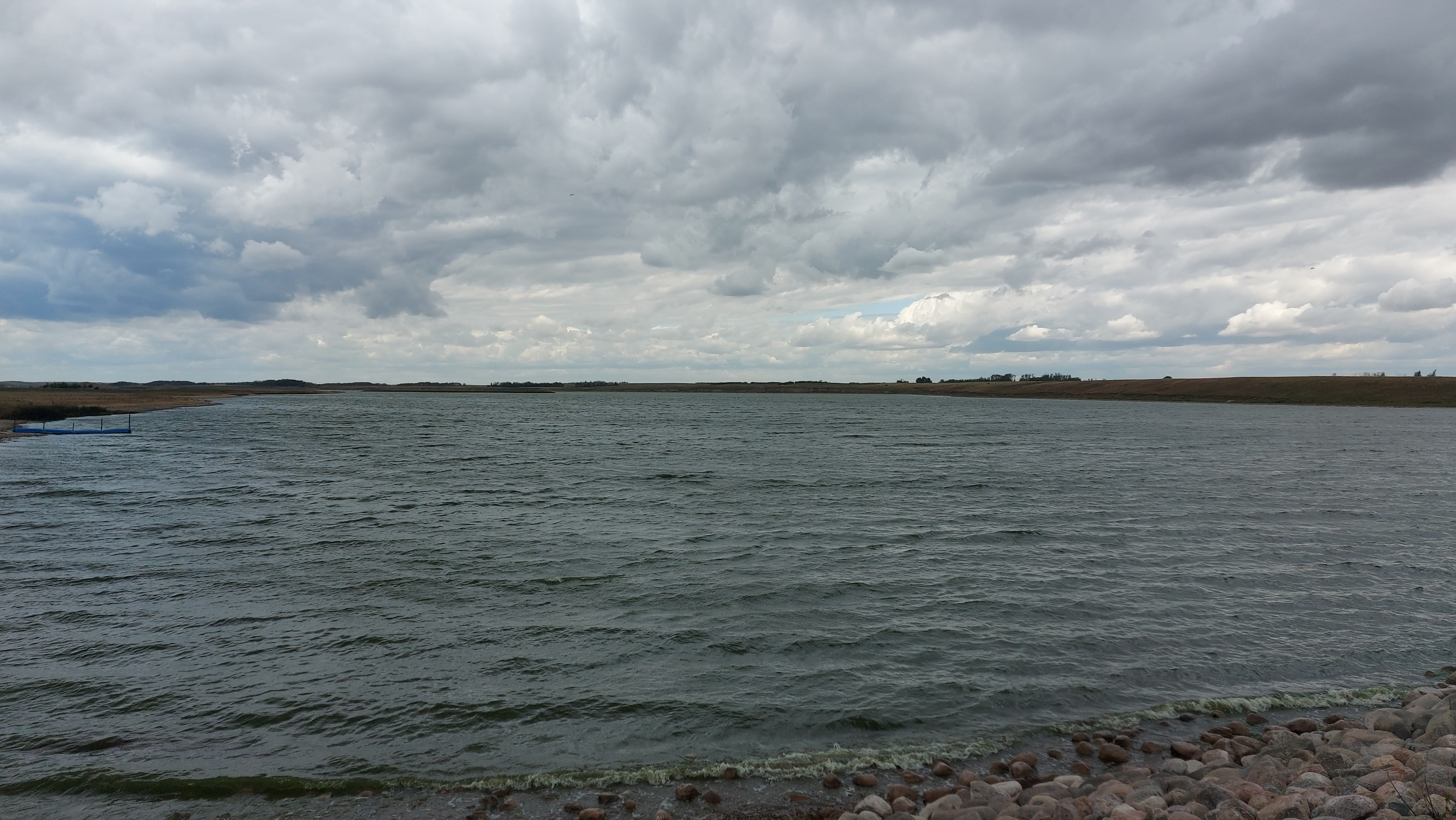
- Moose Mountain Lake in the RM of Golden West

- Location of the RM of Golden West No. 95 in Saskatchewan
- Coordinates: 49.886°N 103.015°W
- Country: Canada
- Province: Saskatchewan
- Census division: 1
- SARM division: 1
- Federal riding: Souris—Moose Mountain
- Provincial riding: Cannington; Moosomin
- Formed: December 13, 1909

Government
  - Reeve: Kurt Corscadden
  - Governing body: RM of Golden West No. 95 Council
  - Administrator: Edward Mish
  - Office location: Corning

Area (2016)
  - Land: 790.72 km^{2} (305.30 sq mi)

Population (2016)
  - Total: 291
  - Density: 0.4/km^{2} (1.0/sq mi)
- Time zone: CST
  - Summer (DST): CST
- Postal code: S0G 0T0
- Area codes: 306 and 639

The Rural Municipality of Golden West No. 95 (2016 population: 291) is a rural municipality (RM) in the Canadian province of Saskatchewan within Census Division No. 1 and SARM Division No. 1. It is located in the southeast portion of the province.

== History ==
The RM of Golden West No. 95 incorporated as a rural municipality on December 13, 1909.

== Government ==
=== Communities and localities ===
The following unincorporated communities are within the RM.

Organized hamlets

- Corning

Localities

- Gapview
- Handsworth

The Ocean Man First Nation is also adjacent to the RM.

== Demographics ==
Population history (1981–2016)
Year	Pop.	±%
1981	622	—
1986	582	−6.4%
1991	526	−9.6%
1996	547	+4.0%
2001	344	−37.1%
2006	322	−6.4%
2011	315	−2.2%
2016	291	−7.6%
Source: Statistics Canada via Saskatchewan Bureau of Statistics

In the 2021 Census of Population conducted by Statistics Canada, the RM of Golden West No. 95 had a population of 289 living in 114 of its 129 total private dwellings, a change of −0.7% from its 2016 population of 291. With a land area of 781.59 km^{2} (301.77 sq mi), it had a population density of 0.4/km^{2} (1.0/sq mi) in 2021.

In the 2016 Census of Population, the RM of Golden West No. 95 recorded a population of 291 living in 124 of its 138 total private dwellings, a −7.6% change from its 2011 population of 315. With a land area of 790.72 km^{2} (305.30 sq mi), it had a population density of 0.4/km^{2} (1.0/sq mi) in 2016.

== Economy ==
The RM's major industry is agriculture.

== Government ==
The RM of Golden West No. 95 is governed by an elected municipal council and an appointed administrator that meets on the second Thursday of every month. The reeve of the RM is Kurt Corscadden while its administrator is Edward Mish. The RM's office is located in Corning.

== Transportation ==
- Saskatchewan Highway 47
- Saskatchewan Highway 616
- Saskatchewan Highway 701
- Saskatchewan Highway 711
- Canadian Pacific Railway (abandoned)
